= 2024 in paleomammalogy =

This article records new taxa of fossil mammals of every kind described during the year 2024, as well as other significant discoveries and events related to paleontology of mammals that occurred in 2024.

== Afrotherians ==
=== Proboscideans ===
==== Proboscidean research ====
- Hauffe, Cantalapiedra & Silvestro (2024) present a Bayesian model that can be used to determine diversification dynamics from fossil occurrence data, apply it to the fossil record of proboscideans, and interpret their findings as indicating that the diversification of proboscideans was influenced by dietary flexibility and biogeography (particularly the association with islands), while the emergence of humans was the primary driver of proboscidean extinctions.
- Review of the evolution of the proboscidean head, focusing on the evolution of the anatomy and use of tusks and proboscis, is published by Nabavizadeh (2024).
- A study on the evolution of limb bones of extant and extinct proboscideans, providing evidence of adaptations to columnar posture and mass support, is published by Bader et al. (2024).
- Konidaris et al. (2024) describe new proboscidean material from Late Miocene localities in Romania, including fossils of Deinotherium proavum and "Mammut" cf. obliquelophus, as well as the first fossil material of a member of the genus Konobelodon from the country.
- Yaghoubi et al. (2024) describe fossil material of "Mammut" cf. obliquelophus from the Miocene fossiliferous areas of Maragheh (Iran), extending known geographical range of this taxon.
- May (2024) revises the biochronology and distribution of gomphothere occurrences from the Miocene of the Texas Coastal Plain.
- Evidence from the study of molars of Notiomastodon platensis from Brazilian Quaternary fossiliferous assemblages, interpreted as indicating that N. platensis was susceptible to tartar development, is presented by Paiva, Alves-Silva & Barbosa (2024).
- A study on the diet of specimens of Notiomastodon platensis collected from areas in central Chile is published by González-Guarda et al. (2024), who interpret their findings as indicative of the presence of xerophyte scrubs in central Chile during the Late Pleistocene, similar to the present-day environment of the studied area.
- Li et al. (2024) report the discovery of fossil material of Stegolophodon pseudolatidens from the Miocene Fotan Formation in Fujian, representing the first known record of Neogene proboscidean fossils in southeastern China.
- A study on the histology of a rib of a specimen of Stegodon florensis florensis from the So'a Basin (Flores, Indonesia) is published by Basilia et al. (2024), who interpret the histology of the bone tissue as possibly indicative of a relatively long lifespan of the studied individual.
- Biswas, Chang & Tsai (2024) provide body mass estimates of specimens of Palaeoloxodon from Taiwan, determining the studied specimens to be similar in size to straight-tusked elephants across Eurasia.
- Pineda et al. (2024) study the assemblage of straight-tusked elephant remains from the Notarchirico site (Italy), and argue that the available evidence does not support the interpretation of the studied site as the elephant butchery area.
- Jukar et al. (2024) describe a skull of a member of the genus Palaeoloxodon from the Middle Pleistocene Pampore Member in the Karewas of Kashmir, most closely resembling the skull of the type specimen of Palaeoloxodon turkmenicus, and interpret this finding as supporting the presence of a Middle Pleistocene species of Palaeoloxodon in Central and South Asia with a morphology intermediate between African and Eurasian species.
- Evidence from tooth enamel of a straight-tusked elephant specimen from the MIS 12 site Marathousa 1 (Greece), interpreted as indicating that the studied individual (as well as the hominins that processed its carcass) lived in stable environmental conditions with sufficient plant cover and limited seasonality, is presented by Roditi et al. (2024).
- A study on the age of the fossil, age and health of the individual prior to death, affinities and diagenetic processes after death of the mammoth specimen collected in 1966 from the hydrothermal spring deposit near Soda Springs (Idaho, United States), interpreted as one of the latest members of the Mammuthus jeffersonii lineage from the mainland Western North America reported to date, is published by Morrison et al. (2024).
- Rowe et al. (2024) use isotopic and genetic data from a tusk of a female woolly mammoth from the Swan Point Archaeological Site (Alaska, United States) to trace the studied individual's lifetime movements, interpret their findings as indicative of movement of the studied individual approximately 1000 km northwest in the middle of her life, and compare the range of movement of the studied mammoth with the distribution of early archaeological sites in Alaska, arguing that early North Americans likely settled in the territories frequently used by mammoths.
- Sandoval-Velasco et al. (2024) present evidence of preservation of three-dimensional genome architecture in a 52,000-year-old permafrost-preserved woolly mammoth skin sample collected near Belaya Gora (Sakha Republic, Russia).
- Du et al. (2024) reconstruct the phylogenetic relationships and evolutionary history of Late Pleistocene woolly mammoths from northern and northeastern China on the basis of mitogenomic data, reporting evidence of presence of members of three mitochondrial clades of woolly mammoths in the studied sample.
- A study on the genetic consequences of isolation of woolly mammoths from Wrangel Island (Russia), as indicated by genomic data, is published by Dehasque et al. (2024), who find that the mainland population of mammoths from northeastern Siberia underwent little changes in genome-wide diversity prior to their extinction, that mammoths from Wrangel Island recovered quickly from the population bottleneck after becoming isolated on the island and their population subsequently remained stable with no evidence of accelerated decline prior to extinction (in spite of evidence of genomic erosion), and that the extinction of mammoths from Wrangel Island happened rapidly and its causes are uncertain.
- A review of the dwarf Sardinan mammoth species Mammuthus lamarmorai is presented by Palombo, Zedda and Zomboli (2024).
- Lister & Dalén (2024) evaluate the implications of the mammoth DNA analysis published by van der Valk et al. (2021) for the knowledge of the evolutionary history of mammoths and for their taxonomy.

=== Sirenians ===
==== Sirenia research ====
- Mamdouh et al. (2024) describe fossil material of members of the genus Protosiren representing the first sirenians reported from the Eocene (Bartonian) ornamental limestone from the Eastern Desert (Egypt).

=== Other afrotherians ===
Name	Novelty	Status	Authors	Age	Type locality	Country	Notes	Images
Abdahyrax	Gen. et sp. nov		Vitek et al.	Oligocene		Kenya	A member of Hyracoidea. Genus includes new species A. philipi.	
Axainamasia	Gen. et sp. nov		Métais et al.	Eocene-Oligocene transition	Cemalletin Formation	Turkey	An embrithopod. The type species is A. sandersi.	
Crivadiatherium sahini	Sp. nov		Métais et al.	Eocene	Baraklı Formation	Turkey	An embrithopod.	
Crivadiatherium sevketseni	Sp. nov		Métais et al.	Eocene	Baraklı Formation	Turkey	An embrithopod.	
Geniohyus ewoii	Sp. nov		Vitek et al.	Oligocene		Kenya	A member of Hyracoidea.	
Nengohyrax	Gen. et sp. nov		Vitek et al.	Oligocene		Kenya	A member of Hyracoidea. Genus includes new species N. josephi.	
Thyrohyrax ekaii	Sp. nov		Vitek et al.	Oligocene		Kenya	A member of Hyracoidea.	
Thyrohyrax lokutani	Sp. nov		Vitek et al.	Oligocene		Kenya	A member of Hyracoidea.	

==== Miscellaneous afrotherian research ====
- Vitek & Princehouse (2024) evaluate classification criteria used to assign individual molars to serial position in fossil hyracoids.

== Euarchontoglires ==
=== Primates ===
Name	Novelty	Status	Authors	Age	Type locality	Country	Notes	Images
Buronius	Gen. et sp. nov	Valid	Böhme et al.	Late Miocene	Hammerschmiede clay pit	Germany	A hominid. The type species is B. manfredschmidi.	
Homo juluensis	Sp. nov		Wu & Bae in Bae	Pleistocene		China; Taiwan; Russia; Laos?	A species of Homo, proposed to include Pleistocene hominins from the Xujiayao, Lingjing (Xuchang), Xiahe and Penghu sites, as well as Denisovans and possibly an individual from the Tam Ngu Hao 2 (Cobra) Cave in Laos; Kaifu & Athreya (2024) do not consider this grouping to be well founded, noting that mandibular remains from Xujiayao lack the body to compare with the Xiahe mandible.	Xiahe mandible
Microchoerus erinaceus duplex	Ssp. nov	Valid	Hooker	Paleogene		United Kingdom	A member of the family Omomyidae.	
Orogalago	Gen. et sp. nov		Marivaux in Marivaux et al.	Oligocene (Rupelian)	Samlat Formation	Western Sahara	A probable member of Lorisiformes. The type species is O. saintexuperyi.	
Orolemur	Gen. et sp. nov		Marivaux in Marivaux et al.	Oligocene (Rupelian)	Samlat Formation	Western Sahara	A member of Strepsirrhini of uncertain affinities. The type species is O. mermozi.	

==== Primate research ====
- A study on the frequency of caries in strepsirrhines and on implications for determining diet and health of fossil members of the group, based on data from extant strepsirrhines, Karanisia clarki and Megaladapis madagascariensis, is published by Selig et al. (2024).
- Chaimanee et al. (2024) describe the anatomy of the maxilla of Siamopithecus eocaenus and interpret the studied primate as an anthropoid belonging to the family Siamopithecidae.
- New fossil material of the Hispaniola monkey is described by Halenar-Price et al. (2024), who provide the first description of the complete anterior dentition of the studied monkey, and interpret the ranges of the body mass and the endocranial volumes of the studied specimens as indicating that the brain size of the Hispaniola monkey was not smaller than expected for its body mass.
- Evidence from the study of incisors of extant anthropoids, interpreted as indicative of mixed-feeding ecology of the Hispaniola monkey, is presented by Cobb et al. (2024).
- Bouchet et al. (2024) describe new fossil material of Pliobates cataloniae, and interpret this primate as a member of Pliopithecoidea belonging to the family Crouzeliidae.
- Evidence from the study of the enamel–dentine junction in the molars of Pliobates cataloniae, interpreted as supporting the classification of P. cataloniae as a crouzeliid pliopithecoid, is presented by Bouchet et al. (2024).
- Revision of the fossil material of Old World monkeys from the Pliocene Mount Galili Formation (Ethiopia), indicative of closer similarity of the studied faunal assemblage to monkey assemblages from the Kanapoi and Gona localities than to the one from Aramis, is published by Reda et al. (2024).
- Stan et al. (2024) revise fossil material of Plio–Pleistocene Old World monkeys from Romania, and interpret the studied monkeys as indicative of a mosaic habitat with open and forested areas.
- A molar of cf. Paradolichopithecus sp., possibly belonging to a previously unknown species, is described from the Pliocene strata from the Ridjake site (Serbia) by Radović et al. (2024).
- Pina & Nakatsukasa (2024) interpret the morphology of the ulna of Nacholapithecus kerioi as consistent with adaptations for quadrupedal behaviors, and sharing morphological features with ulnae of large papionins, chimpanzees and extinct taxa such as Equatorius.
- A study on the morphology of a thoracic vertebra of Nacholapithecus kerioi is published by Kikuchi et al. (2024).
- A study on the distribution of the cortical bone in the femoral neck of Nacholapithecus, and on its implications for the knowledge of the locomotor behavior of Nacholapithecus, is published by Tomizawa et al. (2024).
- Alba et al. (2024) describe new fossil material of Anoiapithecus brevirostris from the Miocene strata of the Abocador de Can Mata sequence in the Vallès-Penedès Basin (Spain).
- Russo et al. (2024) describe a partial postcranial skeleton of an ape from the Middle Miocene sediments of Napudet (Kenya), interpreting the studied specimen as having large forelimbs and likely relying on forelimb-dominated movement in the tree (possibly including vertical climbing) to a greater degree than most Early Miocene apes.
- Review of the evidence supporting main competing hypotheses on the phylogenetic placement of Oreopithecus bambolii is published by Alba et al. (2024).
- Review of the evidence supporting main competing hypotheses on the causes of extinction of Oreopithecus bambolii is published by DeMiguel & Rook (2024), who interpret the extinction of O. bambolii as most likely caused by competition with and predation by invading species from continental Europe.
- A study on the inner ear and probable locomotion of Lufengpithecus is published by Zhang et al. (2024), who report that Lufengpithecus and other Miocene stem apes had the bony labyrinth morphology intermediate between that of gibbons and great apes, and argue that stem apes shared a common pattern of locomotion that combined aspects of the locomotor behaviors of gibbons and chimpanzees.
- A study on tooth enamel thickness and distribution in Lufengpithecus lufengensis is published by Zhang et al. (2024), who find enamel of Lufengpithecus to be thicker than those of orangutans and gorillas, but thinner than those of Homo erectus and modern humans.
- A study on the timeline and causes of extinction of Gigantopithecus blacki is published by Zhang et al. (2024), who use data from caves in the Chongzuo and Bubing Basin (China) to establish a regional window of extinction of G. blacki at 295.000–215.000 years ago, and interpret the demise of G. blacki as caused by inability to adapt to changes in forest structure resulting from increased seasonality.
- A sample of possible teeth of Pongo devosi is described from the Zhongshan Cave by Liang et al. (2024), representing fossil material of the smallest fossil orangutans from southern China reported to date.
- Cazenave et al. (2024) argue that, contrary to the conclusions of Daver et al. (2022), the anatomy of the femur of Sahelanthropus tchadensis does not support the interpretation of this hominid as habitually bipedal.
- A study on the skull of Sahelanthropus tchadensis is published by Neves et al. (2024), who report that S. tchadensis shared closer morphological similarities with hominins than with great apes.
- Evidence indicating that upper teeth of Sahelanthropus tchadensis fall within the range of dental variation of Plio-Pleistocene hominins is presented by Neves, Valota & Monteiro (2024).
- Evidence of similarity of patterns of selection of stone tools by extant chimpanzees from Bossou (Guinea) and by Oldowan hominins is presented by Braun et al. (2024).
- A study reconstructs the genetic event of tail-loss in human ancestors around 25 million years ago.
- A study on the temporal lobe evolution in the family Hominidae, based on data from extant humans and great apes and fossil hominins, is published by Pearson & Polly (2024), who find that the greatest changes to temporal lobe proportions happened not in the genus Homo but earlier in hominin evolution.
- Ciurana et al. (2024) compare the muscle insertion sites on the proximal end of the ulna in extant and extinct hominids, interpret the relative size of the insertion sites as related to the relative mass of the triceps and the brachialis muscle and to the locomotion of the studied hominids, and interpret their findings as indicating that Australopithecus and Paranthropus likely used arboreal locomotion to complement their bipedalism, similar to extant bonobos but unlike members of the genus Homo.

==== General paleoanthropology ====
- A study on the biogeography of early hominins is published by Sekhavati & Strait (2024).
- McRae & Wood (2024) present an inventory of fossils of early hominins from Africa allocated to taxa.
- Negash et al. (2024) reconstruct the proportion of woody cover at eastern African early hominin sites spanning the past 6 million years, and report that early hominin paleoenvironments were dominated by mixed tree–C_{4} grass savannas.
- Evidence indicating that patterns of speciation and extinction of members of the genus Homo differed from those of other hominins is presented by van Holstein & Foley (2024).
- Evidence from the study of extant mammals, interpreted as indicating that the eastern branch of the Eastern African Rift System might not be representative for morphological diversity and habitat reconstructions of early hominin in the entirety of their likely geographical range, is presented by Barr & Wood (2024).
- Evidence from experimental study, interpreted as indicating that practical experience enabled efficient use of flakes by early hominins, is presented by Eteson et al. (2024), who argue that the ability to accumulate practical knowledge might have formed the basis for tool-using innovations that ultimately led to the development of more complex stone tools.
- Affinito et al. (2024) study brain activation patterns related to forceful hammerstone percussion and precise flake cutting, and interpret their findings as supporting the existence of a link between modifications of the brain in the hominin evolution and stone tool use.
- Püschel et al. (2024) report evidence of within-species increase in brain size during hominin evolution, and interpret this pattern as explaining the overall increase in relative brain size across hominin evolution.
- Lewis et al. (2024) describe an approximately 4.3 million-years-old hominin mandible from the Ileret site (Kenya), interpreted as the oldest specimen of Australopithecus anamensis reported to date, and argue that Ardipithecus ramidus was more likely a relative rather than a direct ancestor of Australopithecus.
- A study on changes of the complexity of stone tool manufacturing over the last 3.3 million years is published by Paige & Perreault (2024), who find evidence of an increase of technological complexity approximately 600,000 years ago, interpreted as related to the beginnings of human cumulative culture.
- Braga & Grine (2024) describe new fossil material of Paranthropus robustus from the Kromdraai fossil site (South Africa), providing information on the anatomy of previously unknown portions of the juvenile cranium of P. robustus, and interpret the studied fossil as consistent with the presence of a significant sexual dimorphism in the studied species.
- A study on the endocast of the DNH 7 specimen of Paranthropus robustus from the Drimolen site (South Africa) is published by Falk & Marom (2024), who interpret the studied specimen as indicating that the three species of Paranthropus had a fixed system of enlarged venous sinuses in the skull, as well as suggesting that infants of Australopithecus africanus and members of the genus Paranthropus developed cranial blood flow differently.
- A study on the bony vestibule morphology of Paranthropus robustus, Australopithecus africanus and extant hominids, providing evidence of distinctive morphology of P. robustus compared to other studied taxa, is published by Smith et al. (2024).
- A study on the morphology of the hip bone of the Australopithecus individual known as "Little Foot" is published by Crompton et al. (2024), who interpret "Little Foot" and the individual StW 431 as most likely representing the same species, distinct from Australopithecus africanus and providing evidence of the presence of two species of Australopithecus at Sterkfontein, and interpret the variability of the hip bone morphology of Plio-Pleistocene hominins as consistent with multiple forms of bipedality.
- Evidence interpreted as indicating that fossil material of "Little Foot" is 3.6 million years old is presented by Thackeray (2024).
- A study on the entheseal patterns in the hand skeleton of Australopithecus afarensis, A. africanus and A. sediba is published by Kunze et al. (2024), who interpret their findings as suggesting that the habitual hand use of A. sediba and A. afarensis included activities similar to power-squeeze grasping and in-hand manipulation of members of the genus Homo.
- Bates et al. (2024) interpret Australopithecus afarensis as capable of bipedal running but with lower speed than modern humans, with running energetics similar to those of mammals and birds of similar body size.
- Hanegraef et al. (2024) compare the maxillary shapes of the holotype specimens of Kenyanthropus platyops and Australopithecus deyiremeda with those of other mid-Pliocene hominins, and interpret their findings as supporting the status of K. platyops and A. deyiremeda as distinct species.
- Rowan & Wood (2024) review the impact of the discovery of the Taung Child for the studies of the hominin evolution at the time of its announcement, as well as the implications of subsequent discoveries for Raymond Dart's assessment of the significance of this finding.
- A study on the environmental preferences of hominins over the past 3 million years is published by Zeller & Timmermann (2024), who report evidence of two major phases of increasing adaptation toward rough terrain (related to greater biome diversity): from 2 to 1.1 million years ago, interrupted during the Mid-Pleistocene Transition, and from the 0.9 to 0.1 million years ago, coinciding with expansion of Homo heidelbergensis and Neanderthals into Europe.
- Claims that the Melka Kunture site-complex (Ethiopia) includes Oldowan and early Acheulean material which is approximately 2.0-1.9 million-years-old, presented by Mussi et al. (2023) and Muttoni et al. (2023), are contested by Gossa et al. (2024).
- Finestone et al. (2024) report the discovery of a new, approximately 1.7-million-years-old Oldowan locality Sare-Abururu (Homa Peninsula, Kenya), interpret the stone tools from this locality as indicating that hominins from Sare-Abururu were skilled knappers using quartz pebbles to produce flakes with sharp cutting edges, and report evidence of different raw material utilization and composition of stone tool assemblages from different Oldowan localities, likely related to differences of local landscapes and ecology.
- Evidence indicating that dental changes associated with later members of the genus Homo were not present in Homo habilis is presented by Davies et al. (2024).
- A study on the histology of teeth of Homo naledi, providing evidence of enamel growth resembling the one seen in modern humans, is published by Mahoney et al. (2024).
- Delezene et al. (2024) interpret low degree of morphological variation between teeth of different individuals of Homo naledi as consistent with the interpretation of known sample of fossils of H. naledi as including few or no individuals of one sex.
- A study on enamel formation in Homo naledi, providing evidence of short episodes of distress resulting from disease and longer periods of distress redulting from a season of undernutrition, is published by Skinner et al. (2024).
- Description of the endocast morphology of one of the specimens of Homo naledi from the Lesedi Chamber of the Rising Star Cave in South Africa (Lesedi Hominin 1) is published by Hurst et al. (2024).
- Evidence from the study of the hand skeleton of Homo naledi, interpreted as indicating that the evolution of precision grip in hominins might have been facilitated by a shift in embryonic development, presented by Cofran & Kivell (2024).
- Foecke, Queffelec & Pickering (2024) argue that geochemical and sedimentological data from the Dinaledi Chamber of the Rising Star Cave System provide no evidence of deliberate burial of remains of Homo naledi in the studied cave.
- Pettitt & Wood (2024) evaluate the strength of the evidence supporting claims about age, burial context and behavior of Homo naledi presented in earlier studies.
- A study on the subsistence strategies of early hominins in tropical grasslands is published by Reschke, Krüger & Hertler (2024), who argue that hominin foragers were able to hunt large herbivores by adopting hunting strategies which did not take long to perform or by extensive cooperation of hunters.
- Hatala et al. (2024) report the discovery of approximately 1.5-million-years-old hominin footprints from Koobi Fora (Kenya) produced by two different types of bipedal walking on the same surface, and interpret this finding as likely evidence of sympatry of Paranthropus boisei and Homo erectus.
- Martin et al. (2024) interpret the morphology of the partial hominin cranium (with evidence of carnivoran predation) SK 54 from the Swartkrans cave (South Africa) as more likely indicative of affinities with Homo erectus than with Paranthropus robustus, and interpret this specimen as indicating that early members of the genus Homo were prey for carnivorans.
- Zollikofer et al. (2024) study development of teeth of a subadult Dmanisi hominin individual, and report evidence of an extended growth phase before a slow-down in life history of the studied individual, before expansion and reorganization of the brain in members of the genus Homo.
- Garba et al. (2024) determine the oldest stone tools from the Korolevo site (Ukraine) to be approximately 1.42 million years old, making the studied tools the earliest securely dated evidence of hominin presence in Europe reported to date.
- Gibert et al. (2024) determine the early hominin sites in the Orce region of Spain: Venta Micena, Barranco León-5 and Fuente Nueva-3 to be, respectively, approximately 1.32, 1.28 and 1.23 million years old, and interpret these dates as indicating that early hominins using Oldowan technology reached Europe approximately 0.5 million years after first leaving Africa.
- Despriée et al. (2024) determine the occupation of the Lunery-Rosieres la-Terre-des-Sablons site (France) by early hominins to date to around 1,175,000 years ago, and interpret the stone tool industries from this site and from other sites from Western Europe of similar age as indicating that early European hominins settled in zones that were only inhospitable during very cold stages, opportunistically flaked local siliceous materials and occasionally attempted complex core technologies.
- Ma et al. (2024) report evidence of the use of prepared-core technique at the Cenjiawan site in the Nihewan Basin (China), and interpret this finding as indicating that hominins with advanced technologies might have been present in high latitude East Asia as early as 1.1 million years ago.
- Evidence interpreted as indicating that Mid-Pleistocene environmental changes resulted in early hominins from southern part of Palearctic Eurasia becoming more widely dispersed and stimulated improvements in technology complexes is presented by Zan et al. (2024).
- A study on the cranial morphology and probable relationships of Pleistocene archaic hominins from eastern Asia is published by Kaifu & Athreya (2024), who interpret their findings as supporting the continuity and integrity of Homo erectus from Java as a single evolutionary lineage, providing evidence of cranial form similarity between African and Chinese fossils, interpret Homo erectus as likely ancestral to both Homo floresiensis and Homo luzonensis, and find no evidence that Denisovans crossed the seas of Southeast Asia.
- Kaifu et al. (2024) describe new hominin fossil material from the Mata Menge site (Flores, Indonesia), providing evidence that approximately 700,000 years ago hominins even smaller than the holotype of Homo floresiensis lived on Flores, and interpret H. floresiensis as member of a long-lasting lineage that likely evolved from Asian Homo erectus and maintained small body size during and beyond the Middle Pleistocene.
- Review of developments in the study of Paleolithic bone knapping tool industries in the preceding years is published by Parfitt & Bello (2024), who reevaluate evidence of the presence of bone knapping tools at the Acheulean Horse Butchery Site (Boxgrove, West Sussex, United Kingdom) and at the Magdalenian Gough's Cave site (Somerset, United Kingdom).
- A study on the morphological variation of the calvaria of Middle Pleistocene hominins from Africa and Eurasia with uncertain affinities is published by Hautavoine et al. (2024), who report that, in the general, the studied fossils from Africa tend to share closer affinities with Homo ergaster and Homo sapiens and the Eurasian specimens with Neanderthals, but also report that some of the studied specimens do not follow this general pattern, and interpret their findings as suggesting that multiple hominin populations with different affinities might have contributed to the emergence of Neanderthals and Homo sapiens.
- A study on the anatomy and affinities of Pleistocene hominins from the Xujiayao site is published by Wu & Bae (2024), who argue that Pleistocene hominins from Xujiayao and Lingjing sites in China might represent a previously unidentified population of large-brained hominins (subsequently assigned to the species Homo juluensis), differing from other Pleistocene hominins in cranial morphology and possibly resulting from interbreeding between different archaic human lineages.
- A study on the morphology of the frontal bone of a Pleistocene hominin from Kocabaş (Turkey) is published by Mori et al. (2024), who interpret the studied hominin as more likely belonging to Homo heidelbergensis sensu lato than to Homo erectus sensu lato.
- Review of genetic differences among Neandertals, Denisovans and modern humans, and of the impact of gene flow between archaic and modern humans on their physiology, is published by Zeberg, Jakobsson & Pääbo (2024).
- A study on the distribution of Denisovan and Neandertal DNA within two modern human populations living in the mountainous terrain surrounding Mount Wilhelm and Daru Island (Papua New Guinea) is published by Yermakovich et al. (2024), who interpret their findings as indicative of a significant role of Denisovan DNA in the adaptive processes of the studied populations, in particular in influencing the biology of their brains and their immune response to tropical diseases.
- Ongaro & Huerta-Sanchez (2024) review evidence of introgressions of Denisovan populations into modern humans.
- Evidence indicating that Denisovans from the Baishiya Karst Cave (China) exploited animals from the Tibetan Plateau (mostly large herbivores, but also carnivores, small mammals and birds) for their bones which were used for tool production, as well as for their meat, marrow and hides, is presented by Xia et al. (2024), who also describe a new Denisovan rib from the Baishiya Karst Cave, providing evidence of presence of Denisovans at the site until at least 48,000–32,000 years ago.
- A study on the geochronology of Panxian Dadong hominin cave site (Guizhou, China), providing evidence of one of the earliest hominin settlement sites in southwestern China during the Middle Pleistocene, is published by Che et al. (2024).
- Pablos & Arsuaga (2024) study the anatomy of tarsals, metatarsal bones and foot phalanges of Middle Pleistocene hominins from the Sima de los Huesos site (Spain), found to be generally more robust than corresponding bones of extant and fossil Homo sapiens, and interpret the anatomy of the studied bones as supporting the placement of the Sima de los Huesos hominins as the sister evolutionaty group of Neanderthals.
- Review of the anatomy of the thorax and lumbar spine of the hominins from the Sima de los Huesos site is published by Gómez-Olivencia & Arsuaga (2024).
- A study on wooden artifacts from Schöningen 13 II-4 (Germany) is published by Leder et al. (2024), who report evidence of the presence of at least 20 hunting weapons as well as evidence of the presence of artifacts which were likely domestic tools, indicating that Schöningen was not only a hunting or butchering site but also a place for domestic activities of the hominins that produced the artifacts.
- Evidence from the Schöningen 13II-4 site, interpreted as indicative of selective, specialized hunting of horses (Equus mosbachensis) by Middle Pleistocene hominins, is presented by Hutson et al. (2024).
- Riga et al. (2024) provide evidence of the presence of a hominin with a more archaic metatarsal morphology compared to Neanderthals at the Sedia del Diavolo site (Italy), which might indicate coexistence of at least two hominin clades in the Italian Peninsula during the beginning of Marine Isotope Stage 8.
- Evidence interpreted as indicating that Neanderthals had 2.5 to 3.7% modern human ancestry, as well as indicating that accounting for effects of modern human-introgressed DNA sequences results in reduction of estimates of Neanderthal population size by ~20%, and evidence of two distinct episodes of modern human gene flow into Neanderthal populations is presented by Li et al. (2024).
- A study on the frequency of enamel hypoplasia in Neanderthals and Upper Paleolithic anatomically modern humans is published by Limmer et al. (2024), who interpret their findings as indicative of similar overall early life stress levels in both groups, but also as indicative of differences in the likelihood of occurrence of hypoplasia throughout ontogeny which might be related to differences in childcare between the two groups.
- Evidence from the Scladina Cave (Belgium), indicative of exploitation of birds by Middle Paleolithic Neanderthals as a part of their diet and possibly also for tool production and for symbolic purposes, is presented by Goffette et al. (2024).
- Evidence interpreted as indicating that the Shanidar 3 Neanderthal individual had a typical "bell-shaped" Neanderthal thorax is presented by López-Rey, García-Martínez & Bastir (2024), who also interpret the ribcage morphology of the Shanidar 3 and Kebara 2 individuals as inconsistent with the idea that Neanderthal body plan was specifically adapted to cold environments.
- A study on cut marks on a hyena phalanx bone from the Navalmaíllo Rock Shelter (Spain) is published by Moclán et al. (2024), who interpret the studied cut marks as evidence of skinning of the hyena pelt by Neanderthals.
- Conde-Valverde et al. (2024) report the discovery of remains of a Neanderthal child from Cova Negra (Spain) that lived for at least 6 years in spite of being affected by a debilitating pathology of the inner ear which was likely associated with Down syndrome.
- Navazo Ruiz et al. (2024) study an accumulation of fossils of Late Cretaceous marine molluscs and a sea urchin transported by Neanderthals into the Prado Vargas cave (Spain), report that the majority of the studied fossils were not used as tools, and interpret the accumulation as possible evidence of collecting activities of Neanderthals.
- Evidence of three distinct diets of Neanderthal individuals from the Grotte du Bison and Le Regourdou sites (France) is presented by Dodat et al. (2024).
- Ochando et al. (2024) report the discovery of a new type of Neanderthal hearth from the Vanguard Cave in Gibraltar, interpreted as a specialized burning structure likely used for steam distillation of essential oils from rockroses for tar production.
- Guran et al. (2024) reconstruct the distribution of Neanderthals and anatomically modern humans in southwest Asia and southeast Europe during the Marine Isotope Stage 5, and identify the Iranian Plateau (particularly the Zagros Mountains) as the area of contact and potential interbreeding between the two lineages.
- Evidence indicating that the availability and distribution of the habitat suitable for the last Neanderthal populations in Europe was affected by climate fluctuations is presented by Albouy et al. (2024).
- Evidence from the study of southern Italian sites Cavallo, Castelcivita, Cala and Oscurusciuto, interpreted as indicating that the disappearance of Neanderthals probably preceded the appearance of early modern humans in the studied region, is presented by Higham et al. (2024).
- Slimak et al. (2024) study the genome of a late Neanderthal individual from the Mandrin Cave (France) and interpret this individual as belonging to a previously unknown Neanderthal lineage that stayed genetically isolated from other Neanderthal populations from Western Europe for approximately 50,000 years.
- Sedrati et al. (2024) report the discovery of Late Pleistocene footprints from a rocky beach in Larache (Morocco) representing the oldest known footprints produced by Homo sapiens reported from Northern Africa and the Southern Mediterranean.
- Evidence from the Shinfa-Metema 1 site (Ethiopia) indicative of intensive riverine-based foraging approximately 74,000 years ago, likely aided by adoption of the bow and arrow, is presented by Kappelman et al. (2024), who argue that adaptation to foraging along dry-season waterholes might have facilitated human dispersal out of Africa.
- A study on the mechanical properties of tool-stones from the Diepkloof Rock Shelter (South Africa) is published by Schmidt et al. (2024), who argue that the Middle Stone Age people selected specific rocks that allowed the best trade-off between the expected properties of tools made from the rocks and the ease of acquiring rocks and producing tools.
- Evidence indicating that the Middle Stone Age people occupying the Sibudu Cave (South Africa) were able to produce tar from plant other than Podocarpus, produced tar through the condensation method using leaves and used tar in both single-component and compound adhesives with different mechanical properties, is presented by Schmidt et al. (2024).
- Evidence from the study of ancient and present-day genomes and paleoecological models, interpreted as indicating that the Iranian Plateau likely acted as the hub for Homo sapiens during early phases of migration out of Africa and colonisation of Eurasia, is presented by Vallini et al (2024).
- Evidence indicating that the choice of global expansion routes of anatomically modern humans beyond Africa was driven by suitable environmental conditions is presented by Saltré et al. (2024).
- Cave art depicting human-like figures interacting with a pig, painted at least 51,200 years ago and representing the oldest surviving example of representational art reported to date, is described from the Leang Karampuang cave (Sulawesi, Indonesia) by Oktaviana et al. (2024), who also determine the hunting scene from the limestone cave of Leang Bulu' Sipong 4 described by Aubert et al. (2019) to be painted at least 48,000 years ago, i.e. more than 4,000 years older than initially assumed.
- Paquin et al. (2024) use habitat suitability models for the Aurignacian technocomplex (interpreted as a proxy for the large scale dispersal of anatomically modern humans into Europe) to determine the impact of climate change and variability on human dispersals into Europe during the Marine Isotope Stage 3.
- Shao et al. (2024) present a reconstruction of the human dispersal in Europe at the time of the Aurignacian technocomplex.
- Evidence from the study of human remains from the Ilsenhöhle site in Ranis (Germany), interpreted as indicating that Homo sapiens reached parts of Europe north of the Alps by 45,000 years ago, is presented by Mylopotamitaki et al. (2024); Pederzani et al. (2024) interpret people from Ilsenhöhle as living in environment characterized by temperatures substantially below modern-day conditions, while Smith et al. (2024) report evidence interpreted as indicative of low-intensity use of the site, consistent with small, mobile groups occupying different localities for a short time, and indicative of low dietary variability, with a diet based on large terrestrial mammals.
- Evidence from the study of genomes of individuals from Ilsenhöhle and the Zlatý kůň woman, interpreted as indicative of distant familial relationships of the Ranis and Zlatý kůň individuals, is presented by Sümer et al. (2024), who also interpret genomic data from Ranis individuals as preserving Neanderthal segments resulting from an admixture event dating to approximately 49,000-45,000 years ago.
- Iasi et al. (2024) study Neanderthal ancestry of ancient and modern humans, and report evidence interpreted as indicating that the majority of Neanderthal gene flow happened during a period between 50,500 and 43,500 years ago.
- Tournebize & Chikhi (2024) argue that purported evidence of interbreeding between Neanderthals and modern humans from the studies of genetic data needs reevaluation, as it might be a side effect of use of statistical approaches dependent on demographic models that do not account for population structure rather than actual evidence of admixture events.
- Yang et al. (2024) identify an Initial Upper Paleolithic assemblage at the Shiyu site in northern China, providing evidence of expansion of Homo sapiens into eastern Asia by about 45,000 years ago, as well as evidence of development of advanced cultural behaviours by people from the studied site; Carmignani et al. (2024) subsequently contest attribution of the Shiyu site to the Initial Upper Paleolithic, while Yang et al. (2024) reaffirm their original attribution.
- A study on five Paleolithic sites from the western Hisma Basin (Jordan) is published by Kadowaki et al. (2024), who find that in the studied area a major increase in the cutting-edge productivity happened after the shift from the Levallois technology to the blade technology in the Initial Upper Paleolithic (i.e. after the conventional Middle-Upper Paleolithic boundary), coinciding with the development of bladelet technology in the Early Upper Paleolithic instead, and argue that the Middle-Upper Paleolithic cultural transition was not a single sudden replacement.
- Sahle et al. (2024) report evidence of increase in the intensity and duration of human occupation of the Gorgora rockshelter (Ethiopia) approximately 42,000 years ago, during a stable wet phase in the Lake Tana area, as well as evidence of the development of innovative technologies and symbolic behaviors at the site starting around this time.
- Barzilai et al. (2024) report the discovery of a confined space with an engraved dolomite boulder deep in the Manot Cave (Israel), and interpret the studied area as a communal space used by the Upper Paleolithic Aurignacian inhabitants of the cave for ritual purposes.
- Evidence from the Abrigo de la Malia site (Tamajón, Guadalajara, Spain), indicative of recurrent presence of anatomically modern humans in inland Iberia during the early and mid-Upper Paleolithic in spite of climate changes that resulted in increase of aridity and trend toward colder conditions, is presented by Sala et al. (2024).
- Conard & Rots (2024) describe a perforated baton made from mammoth ivory from the Hohle Fels Cave (Germany), and interpret is as a probable Aurignacian rope making tool.
- Matzig et al. (2024) demonstrate utility of phylodynamic models in the study of changes of knapped stone projectile points from the European Late Upper Paleolithic, providing artefact phylogeny compatible with known patterns of human dispersal and paleogenomic studies.
- A study on the human population history in Upper Paleolithic Europe, as indicated by data from fossil teeth, is published by Rathmann et al. (2024), who interpret their findings as indicative of a population turnover in Western Europe at the beginning of the Late Pleniglacial (approximately 28,000 years ago), as well as indicative of population bottlenecks of people from Western and Eastern Europe during the Last Glacial Maximum, likely related to migrations to geographically distinct refugia.
- Ge et al. (2024) provide new age estimates for human remains from the Tongtianyan cave (China), ranging from ~33,000 to 23,000 years ago.
- Baker et al. (2024) study personal ornaments of European hunter-gatherers living between 34,000 and 24,000 years ago, and interpret them as indicative of existence of nine distinct cultural entities during the time of the existence of the Gravettian technocomplex.
- A study on the skeletal remains of a late Upper Palaeolithic infant from Grotta delle Mura (Apulia, southern Italy), providing evidence of a population turnover in southern Italy around the time of the cultural transition from the Gravettian to the Epigravettian technocomplex, is published by Higgins et al. (2024).
- Evidence from the Laili rockshelter (East Timor), interpreted as indicative of an abrupt onset of intensive human habitation 44,000 years ago, is presented by Shipton et al. (2024), who consider this human habitation to represent a colonization phase that may have overwhelmed previous human dispersals in Wallacea.
- Kaharudin et al. (2024) present the first evidence of Pleistocene human occupation of the Tanimbar Islands, dating back approximately 42,000 years, and report evidence that early inhabitants of the Tanimbar Islands exploited macropods, which are now locally extinct and might represent the earliest case of animal translocation by humans reported to date.
- Salles et al. (2024) reconstruct the pattern of the peopling of Sahul during the Late Pleistocene from a mechanistic movement model, and interpret their findings as indicative of a wave of dispersal following coastlines and rivers.
- Evidence from the eastern seaboard of Australia, interpret as indicative of human occupation by 30,000 years ago and possibly as early as 49,000–45,000 years ago, is presented by Adams et al. (2024).
- Evidence from sedimentary records from western and eastern extremes of the Bass Strait, interpreted as indicating that the ancestors of the Aboriginal Tasmanians markedly burned the landscape when they first entered Tasmania 41,600 years ago, is presented by Adeleye et al. (2024).
- Hawkins et al. (2024) report the discovery of remains of a man and a woman interred in a single grave from the Ratu Mali 2 site (Kisar, Indonesia) which are at least 14.7-thousand-years-old, representing the oldest human burials with established funerary rites from Wallacea reported to date.
- David et al. (2024) report the discovery of 11,000- and 12,000-year-old fireplaces with wooden artefacts at the Cloggs Cave (Australia) matching descriptions of GunaiKurnai ritual installations described in 19th century ethnography, interpreted as evidence of cultural transmission of a ritual practice dating back to the end of the last ice age and continued by approximately 500 generations.
- A study aiming to identify settings viable for vertebrate and human populations in the north Pacific coast of North America during the growth and decay of the Cordilleran ice sheet, providing new age constraints for human coastal migration into North America, is published by Steffen (2024).
- The oldest evidence of the use of hare bone for bead production in western North America known to date is reported from the Clovis La Prele Mammoth site (Wyoming, United States) by Surovell et al. (2024).
- Pelton et al. (2024) present evidence of use of bones of canids, felids and hares for bone needle production at the La Prele site, and interpret their findings as indicating that the earliest North Americans routinely trapped fur-bearing animals.
- Chatters et al. (2024) reconstruct the protein diet of the mother of Anzick-1, and argue that the diet of members of the Clovis band including this individual, and likely Western Clovis people in general, was heavily reliant on mammalian megafauna, particularly mammoths.
- Del Papa et al. (2024) report the presence of cut marks on a specimen of Neosclerocalyptus found on the southern margin of the Reconquista River (Argentina), with radiocarbon date obtained from the pelvis corresponding to the Last Glacial Maximum, and interpreted as consistent with the human occupation of southern South America before 16,000 years ago.
- Evidence supporting the interpretation of the Late Pleistocene molariform tooth of Eremotherium laurillardi from a tank on a farm in Poço Redondo (Sergipe, Brazil) as intentionally modified by humans is presented by the Pansani et al. (2024).
- A study on trees associated with Late Pleistocene/Early Holocene campsites from the Atacama Desert is published by Ugalde et al. (2024), who report evidence of the first people living in the area locating their homes under the tree canopy at two sites, and find that the early people in the area spared the most abundant and resilient tree species, which resulted in promoting fertility oases in the desert.
- Troiano et al. (2024) report the discovery of an association of Early Cretaceous dinosaur tracks and petroglyphs from the Serrote do Letreiro Site (Brazil), and interpret the association as indicating that the engravers acknowledged at least the footprints of theropod dinosaurs and intentionally executed the petroglyphs around them.
- Evidence from isotope analysis of human remains from Taforalt (Morocco), interpreted as indicative as substantial plant-based component in the diets of the hunter-gatherers from this site during the Later Stone Age, is presented by Moubtahij et al. (2024).
- Evidence of use of a wheeled-shaped tool harnessed in a rotational mechanism is reported from the 12,000-year-old Natufian site Nahal Ein Gev II (Israel) by Yashuv & Grosman (2024).
- Remains of a stonewall, interpreted as most likely used as a driving lane for the reindeer hunt during the Younger Dryas or early Preboreal and thus representing one of the oldest known examples of hunting architecture worldwide and possibly the oldest man-made megastructure in Europe, are described from the Bay of Mecklenburg (Baltic Sea off the German coast) by Geersen et al. (2024).
- Evidence from ancient DNA from chewed pitch from the Mesolithic Huseby Klev site (Sweden), interpreted as indicating that people from this site suffered from dental diseases similar to modern periodontitis cases, is presented by Kırdök et al. (2024).
- A study on the genetic ancestries and social dynamics of Late Mesolithic individuals from Téviec, Hoedic and Champigny (France), representing some of the last Mesolithic hunter-gatherers in western Europe, is published by Simões et al. (2024), who report evidence of distinct social units of hunter-gatherers in Brittany that maintained intermarriage networks.
- Allentoft et al. (2024) present evidence from ancient genomes from Eurasia, interpreted as indicative of existence of a clear genetic division between Eurasian human populations living on the opposite sites of the boundary zone extending from the Black Sea to the Baltic which lasted throughout the Mesolithic and Neolithic, with large-scale shifts in genetic ancestry related to the arrival of the Early European Farmers visible only in the areas west of the boundary zone, and dissolving only after the spread of the Western Steppe Herders across western Eurasia.
- A study on human demographic trends in 16 regions throughout 30,000 years of human history, providing evidence that frequent disturbances enhanced populations' capacity to resist and recover from later downturns, is published by Riris et al. (2024).
- Morton-Hayward et al. (2024) compile an archive of human brains preserved in the archaeological record spanning approximately 12,000 years, identifying a total of 4405 preserved human brains, including 1308 brains preserved as the only soft tissue among skeletonized remains.

=== Rodents ===
Name	Novelty	Status	Authors	Age	Type locality	Country	Notes	Images
Acarechimys hunikuini	Sp. nov		Fontoura et al.	Miocene	Solimões Formation	Brazil	A stem-octodontoid.	
Bondesiomys	Gen. et sp. nov		Rasia et al.	Miocene (Chasicoan)	Cerro Azul Formation	Argentina	A member of the family Dinomyidae. The type species is B. chasiquensis.	
Burgia	Nom. nov	Valid	Vianey-Liaud, Weppe & Marivaux	Eocene (Bartonian)	Quercy Phosphorites Formation	France	A member of Ischyromyiformes belonging to the family Theridomyidae and the subfamily Patriotheridomyinae; a replacement name for Bernardia Vianey-Liaud (1991).	
Byzantinia rosamariae	Sp. nov	Valid	López-Antoñanzas et al.	Miocene		Lebanon	A cricetodontine.	
Ctenomys avitus	Sp. nov		De Santi et al.	Pleistocene		Argentina	A tuco-tuco.	
Eliwourus	Gen. et sp. nov		Seiffert et al.	Oligocene	Topernawi Formation	Kenya	A stem anomalure. The type species is E. topernawiensis.	
Excelseomys	Gen. et sp. nov	Valid	Korth & Kihm	Eocene (Chadronian)		United States (North Dakota)	A member of the family Eomyidae. Genus includes new species E. inopinotum.	
Gyriabrus sokka	Sp. nov		Rasia et al.	Miocene (Chasicoan)	Cerro Azul Formation	Argentina	A member of the family Dinomyidae.	
Harrymys matutinus	Sp. nov	Valid	Storer	Oligocene		Canada (Saskatchewan)		
Hartenbergeromys pailladensis	Sp. nov	Valid	Vianey-Liaud et al.	Eocene		France	A theridomorph rodent of uncertain affinities.	
Hystrix aegeanensis	Sp. nov		Halaçlar et al.	Miocene		Greece; Turkey	A species of Hystrix.	
Idicia	Gen. et sp. nov	Valid	Vianey-Liaud, Weppe & Marivaux	Eocene (Bartonian)	Quercy Phosphorites Formation	France	A member of Ischyromyiformes belonging to the family Theridomyidae. The type species is I. vidalenci.	
Lawrenceflynnia	Gen. et sp. nov	Valid	Storer	Oligocene		Canada (Saskatchewan)	A member of the family Laredomyidae. Genus includes new species L. pratum.	
Lophocricetus parvus	Sp. nov		Ma, Zhang & Bi	Miocene		China		
Paradjidaumo hyponomus	Sp. nov	Valid	Korth & Kihm	Eocene (Chadronian)		United States (North Dakota)	A member of the family Eomyidae.	
Rhodanomys occitanensis	Sp. nov	Valid	Luccisano et al.	Miocene		France	A member of the family Eomyidae.	
Sinozapus damiaoensis	Sp. nov		Ma, Zhang & Bi	Miocene		China		
Siphneus tolaensis	Sp. nov	Valid	Golovanov & Zazhigin	Pleistocene		Mongolia	A zokor.	
Wahlertia	Gen. et sp. nov	Valid	Storer	Oligocene		Canada (Saskatchewan)	A member of the family Eomyidae. Genus includes new species W. fossilis.	
Zagoutomys	Gen. et sp. nov		Viñola-López et al.	Quaternary		Haiti	A hutia. The type species is Z. woodsi.	

==== Rodent research ====
- Zack & Penkrot (2024) describe new fossil material of Lophiparamys debequensis from the Eocene Willwood Formation (Wyoming, United States), providing new information on the anatomy of this rodent and representing its first record from the Bighorn Basin.
- Wölfer & Hautier (2024) study the locomotion of Palaeosciurus goti and Palaeosciurus feignouxi, interpreting P. goti as most likely arboreal and P. feignouxi as more likely terrestrial.
- Description of the fossil material of Pleistocene flying squirrels from the Yumidong Cave (Chongqing, China), and a study on the implications of the studied fossils for reconstructions of the environments in the Yumidong Cave area from MIS 5 to MIS 2, is published by Pang et al. (2024).
- Sinitsa & Čermák (2024) redescribe the type specimen of the xerine species Csakvaromys sciurinus, and interpret this species as a junior synonym of Csakvaromys bredai.
- Halaçlar et al. (2024) describe new fossil material of Hystrix primigenia from the Miocene Asartepe Formation (Turkey) and reevaluate the fossil material of members of the genus Hystrix from Turkey, arguing that Hystrix depereti is absent from the Late Miocene fossil record in Turkey.
- Daxner-Höck, Winkler & Kalthoff (2024) describe new fossil material of Hystrix parvae from the Miocene strata from the Kohfidisch site (Austria), providing new information on the anatomy of skull and teeth of this taxon.
- A study on the anatomy of feet of Platypittamys, Neoreomys, Sciamys and Steiromys, providing evidence of morphological diversity of early caviomorphs, is published by Candela et al. (2024).
- Boivin et al. (2024) compare the utility of different methods used to estimate body mass of extinct caviomorph rodents on the basis of their cheek teeth.
- Bertrand et al. (2024) describe the virtual brain endocast of Incamys bolivianus, reporting evidence of enhanced audition and sound processing which might have been adaptations to group living and complex communication.
- Evidence from the study of skulls of extant and fossil members of the genus Lagostomus, interpreted as indicative of similarity of ontogenetic changes in the skulls of members of the studied lineage since the Pliocene, is presented by Segura et al. (2024).
- Evidence indicating that Erethizon poyeri had a long, prehensile tail, grasping foot, and lacked dental specializations for bark gnawing - unlike extant North American porcupine but more closely resembling extant prehensile-tailed porcupines - is presented by Vitek et al. (2024).
- A study on the brain anatomy of Josephoartigasia monesi is published by Ferreira et al. (2024), who recover this species within the encephalization range of extant caviomorphs.
- Redescription and study on the affinities of Orthomyctera andina is published by Madozzo Jaén & Pérez (2024), who transfer this species to the genus Orocavia in the subfamily Caviinae.
- A study on incisor marks in burrow systems assigned to the ichnospecies Yaviichnus iniyooensis from the Oligocene Chilapa Formation (Mexico), interpreted as indicating that the studied burrow systems were produced by multiple individuals belonging to the genus Gregorymys, is published by Guerrero-Arenas & Jiménez-Hidalgo (2024).
- A study on the distribution of beavers in North America in the late Pliocene, Pleistocene and Holocene is published by Lubbers, Samuels & Joyner (2024).
- Revision of fossil zokors and arvicoline cricetids from China is published by Zheng (2024).
- Rekovets et al. (2024) interpret the cricetid genus Ischymomys as distinct from the genus Pannonicola.
- Evidence from the study of a partial mitochondrial genome of a specimen of Pliomys lenki from the El Mirón Cave deposit (Spain), indicative of close phylogenetic relationship of P. lenki with the extant Balkan snow vole, is presented by Alfaro-Ibáñez et al. (2024).
- Taxonomic revision of fossils of members of the tribe Lemmini from the Early and Middle Pleistocene of Europe is published by Louis et al. (2024).
- A study on the phylogenetic relationships of Miocene and Pliocene hamsters belonging to the genera Collimys, Rotundomys, Neocricetodon, Pseudocricetus, Cricetulodon, Apocricetus and Hattomys is published by Dirnberger, Peláez-Campomanes & López-Antoñanzas (2024).

=== Other euarchontoglires ===
Name	Novelty	Status	Authors	Age	Type locality	Country	Notes	Images
Heterohyus crayi	Sp. nov	Valid	Hooker	Paleogene		United Kingdom		
Heterohyus estesi	Sp. nov	Valid	Hooker	Paleogene		United Kingdom		
Lepus berbericus	Sp. nov		Sen et al.	Pleistocene		Morocco	A hare.	
Phenacolemur cavatus	Sp. nov		Anemone et al.	Paleocene		United States (Wyoming)		
Prolagus ressasensis	Sp. nov		Sen et al.	Pleistocene		Tunisia		
Ursolestes blissorum	Sp. nov		Hovatter, Chester & Wilson Mantilla	Paleocene (Torrejonian)	Fort Union Formation	United States (Montana)	A purgatoriid plesiadapiform.	

==== Miscellaneous euarchontoglires research ====
- A study on the evolution of members of the genus Pliopentalagus is published by Tomida et al. (2024), who transfer the species Aztlanolagus agilis to the genus Pliopentalagus.
- Purported paromomyid "Arcius" ilerdensis is reinterpreted as a member of the family Apatemyidae and transferred to the genus Heterohyus by Beard & Métais (2024).
- A study on the affinities picrodontids, as indicated by the anatomy of the skull of Zanycteris paleocenus, is published by Crowell, Wible & Chester (2024), who argue that picrodontids were not stem primates or even euarchontans.
- Schap et al. (2024) report evidence indicative of a strong relationship of tooth crown height in extant African rodents and lagomorphs with annual precipitation (but not with mean annual temperature), and find that tooth crown height of rodents and lagomorphs from fossil sites in eastern Africa can be used to estimate past annual precipitation and shifting precipitation patterns.
- Dunn (2024) describes fossil material of the plesiadapiform Microsyops annectens, the notharctid adapiform Notharctus robustior, and omomyid tarsiiforms Hemiacodon gracilis, Omomys carteri and Ourayia uintensis from the Eocene strata from the Sand Wash Basin (Colorado, United States), and interpret the studied fossils as indicating that at least some localities within the Sand Wash Basin preserve Uintan fossils.
- A study on the morphological diversity of lower premolars and molars in Paleogene plesiadapiforms and euprimates from North America is published by Hunter, Schottenstein & Jernvall (2024), who report evidence of greater diversity of talonid crown types compared to trigonid crown types during the Paleocene, and evidence of talonid and trigonid richness trends becoming more similar during the Eocene.
- López-Torres et al. (2024) study the allometry of brain mass to body mass of members of Euarchontoglires, and provide new estimates of encephalization quotients of Megalagus turgidus, Microsyops annectens, Adapis parisiensis and Necrolemur antiquus.

== Laurasiatherians ==
=== Artiodactyls ===
==== Cetaceans ====
Name	Novelty	Status	Authors	Age	Type locality	Country	Notes	Images
Adicetus	Gen. et comb. nov	Valid	Figueiredo et al.	Miocene		Portugal	A member of the family Cetotheriidae. The type species is "Cetotherium" vandelli Van Beneden & Gervais (1871); genus also includes "Aulocetus" latus Kellogg (1941).	
Aureia	Gen. et sp. nov		Meekin, Fordyce & Coste	Oligocene	Otekaike Limestone Formation	New Zealand	A member of the superfamily Platanistoidea. The type species is A. rerehua.	
Echericetus	Gen. et sp. nov	Valid	Hernández-Cisneros et al.	Oligocene	El Cien Formation	Mexico	A member of the family Eomysticetidae. The type species is E. novellus.	
Eolipotes	Gen. et sp. nov	Valid	Kimura & Hasegawa	Miocene		Japan	A member of the family Lipotidae. The type species is E. japonicus.	
Fucaia humilis	Sp. nov	Valid	Tsai et al.	Eocene	Lincoln Creek Formation	United States (Washington)	A member of the family Aetiocetidae.	
Glaucabalaena	Gen. et sp. nov	Valid	Bisconti et al.	Pliocene	Sabbie d'Asti Formation	Italy	A member of the family Eschrichtiidae. The type species is G. inopinata.	
Incakujira fordycei	Sp. nov	Valid	Kimura & Hasegawa	Miocene	Pisco Formation	Peru	A rorqual.	
Mamaziphius	Gen. et sp. nov	Valid	Bianucci et al.	Miocene	Pisco Formation	Peru	A beaked whale. The type species is M. reyesi.	
Miodelphinus	Gen. et sp. nov	Valid	Tanaka & Nakagawa	Miocene	Haze Formation	Japan	A member of the family Squalodelphinidae. The type species is M. miensis.	
Pebanista	Gen. et sp. nov	Valid	Benites-Palomino et al.	Miocene	Pebas Formation	Peru	A close relative of the South Asian river dolphin. The type species is P. yacuruna.	
Romaleodelphis	Gen. et sp. nov		Sanchez-Posada et al.	Miocene		Austria	A long-snouted archaic dolphin. Genus includes new species R. pollerspoecki.	
Tohoraonepu	Gen. et sp. nov		Corrie & Fordyce	Oligocene	Kokoamu Greensand	New Zealand	A member of the family Kekenodontidae. The type species is T. nihokaiwaiu.	

===== Cetacean research =====
- Racicot et al. (2024) study inner ear bony labyrinth shape of fossil cetaceans, and interpret their findings as indicative of sensitivity to low-frequency sound in Zygorhiza kochii and cf. Aetiocetus, as well as indicative of adaptation to narrow-band high-frequency hearing in Oligocene toothed whales and in stem delphinidans.
- Xiong, Beatty & Churchill (2024) compare the attachment areas for the temporalis muscle in extant and extinct cetaceans, identified as a proxy for the size of the muscle, and use it to infer the feeding behavior of extinct cetaceans.
- A vertebra of a small-bodied member of the genus Pachycetus, showing low compactness compared to vertebrae of larger members of this genus, is described from the Western Scheldt Estuary at the Belgian-Dutch border (probably from the Bartonian Maldegem Formation) by van Vliet et al. (2024).
- Motani & Pyenson (2024) reevaluate the published body mass estimates of Perucetus colossus, and consider the likeliest body mass of the studied cetacean to fall within the 60–70 ton range.
- A study on the cochlear anatomy of Kekenodon onamata, providing evidence of adaptation to hearing low frequencies, is published by Corrie & Park (2024).
- Tsai, Kimura & Hasegawa (2024) describe an aetiocetid skull from the Jinnobaru Formation of the Ashiya Group (Japan), and interpret this finding as indicative of coexistence of toothed and baleen-assisted mysticetes in the northwestern Pacific during the Oligocene.
- Nobile et al. (2024) describe fossil material of a member of the genus Kentriodon from the Lower Miocene Bolago Marl (Friulian-Venetian Basin, Italy), representing the first unambiguous record of this genus from Europe reported to date, and interpreted by the authors as likely to be the fossil material of the most ancient member of the genus.
- A study on the bony labyrinth morphology and probable hearing abilities of Parapontoporia sternbergi and P. pacifica is published by Sanks & Racicot (2024), who interpret Parapontoporia as able to hear within narrow-band high frequency ranges.
- A study on tooth wear and likely feeding behavior of Coronodon is published by Geisler, Beatty & Boessenecker (2024), who consider raptorial feeding rather than filter feeding to be likely the primary (possible even the only) mode of feeding of Coronodon.
- A probable mysticete tooth with similarities to cheek teeth of Llanocetus denticrenatus is described from the Oligocene Alzey Formation (Germany) by Hampe & von der Hocht (2024).
- Tanaka (2024) reports evidence indicative of the existence of a relationship between basihyal-thyrohyal shape and feeding strategy in baleen whales, and argues that the earliest members of Chaeomysticeti fed exclusively on small prey using the baleen plates for filtering, and that dietary preferences of members of Chaeomysticeti diversified later in their evolutionary history.
- Review of the fossil record of eomysticetids from New Zealand is published by Boessenecker & Richards (2024).
- Evidence indicating that New Zealand rocks preserve the first assemblage of Aquitanian baleen whale fossils reported worldwide is presented by Marx et al. (2024).
- Fossil material of a previously unknown baleen whale similar to Isanacetus laticephalus is described from the Burdigalian to Langhian strata from Biratori Town (Hokkaido, Japan) by Tanaka, Motoyama & Sakurai (2024).
- Aiken et al. (2024) report the earliest cetacean remains in the Black Sea region, and report that the harbour porpoise, the common bottlenose dolphin and the common dolphin were present in the Bosphorus as early as 8000–7800 years ago, and that cetaceans reached the northern and northeastern Black Sea, including the Kerch Strait, by 5500 years ago at the latest.

==== Other artiodactyls ====
Name	Novelty	Status	Authors	Age	Type locality	Country	Notes	Images
Aliusuellus	Gen. et sp. nov	Valid	Bai et al.	Eocene (Irdinmanhan)	Erlian Basin	China	A member of the family Tapirulidae. The type species is A. laolii.	
Bramiscus	Gen. et sp. nov	Valid	Ríos et al.	Miocene	Chinji Formation	Pakistan	A member of the family Giraffidae. The type species is B. micros.	
Dama pontica	Sp. nov	Valid	Vislobokova	Pleistocene		Crimea	A fallow deer.	
Dimidiomeryx	Gen. et comb. nov	Valid	Sánchez et al.	Miocene	Tiejianggou Formation	China	A member of Bovoidea. The type species is "Amphimoschus" xishuiensis Li et al. (2021).	
Hispanodorcas longdongica	Sp. nov	Valid	Wu et al.	Miocene		China	A member of the family Bovidae belonging to the subfamily Antilopinae.	
Irdinodon	Gen. et sp. nov	Valid	Bai et al.	Eocene (Irdinmanhan)	Erlian Basin	China	A member of the subfamily Lantianiinae. The type species is I. bicuspidata.	
"Lyra"	Gen. et sp. nov	Preoccupied	Rios & Solounias	Miocene	Chinji Formation	Pakistan	A member of the family Giraffidae. The type species is"Lyra" sherkana. The genus Lyra is preoccupied by a gastropod named by Mousson (1872); Rios & Solounias (2025) coined a replacement name Lyrakeryx.	
Paraphenacodus gabuniai	Sp. nov	Valid	Bai et al.	Eocene (Arshantan)	Erlian Basin	China		
Pusillutragus	Gen. et sp. nov		Mennecart, Duranthon & Costeur	Early Miocene	Montréal-du-Gers	France	A basal member of the family Bovidae. The type species is P. montrealensis.	
Santuccimeryx	Gen. et comb. nov	Valid	Shreero et al.	Orellan and Whitneyan	Brule Formation	United States (Nebraska; South Dakota)	A member of the family Leptomerycidae. The type species is "Leptomeryx" elissae Korth & Diamond (2002).	
Shilinhyus	Gen. et sp. nov		Wang et al.	Eocene (Sharamurunian)	Lunan Basin	China	A member of Dichobunoidea. The type species is S. chowi.	

===== Other artiodactyl research =====
- Evidence of preservation of original biological microstructures, including fossilized osteocytes, in cainotheriid bones from the Quercy Phosphorites Formation (France) is presented by Wu et al. (2024).
- Ducrocq et al. (2024) describe new fossil material of Siamochoerus banmarkensis from the late Eocene strata from the Krabi coal mine (Thailand), and interpret the anatomy of the studied remains as indicating that Siamochoerus was closer to the Suidae than to any other suoid family.
- McKenzie et al. (2024) describe new fossil material of tetraconodontines and suine suids from the Vallesian site of Castell de Barberà (Spain), and interpret the studied fossils as indicating that Parachleuastochoerus valentini is a distinct species, and indicating that Versoporcus grivensis is a junior synonym of V. steinheimensis.
- McKenzie et al. (2024) study dietary preferences of suids from the Vallesian sites Castell de Barberà and Creu de Conill 20 in the Vallès-Penedès Basin (Spain), and interpret their findings as indicating that, in spite of temporal and geographical proximity, the two sites record different local environments.
- Iannucci (2024) describes 1.47-million-years-old fragment of a metatarsal bone of a member of the genus Sus from the Peyrolles site (France), interpreted as evidence of the presence of suids in Europe within the 1.8-to-1.2-million-years-ago interval; however, Martínez-Navarro et al. (2024) subsequently argue that the specimen studied by Iannucci (2024) has uncertain provenance and age, and find no conclusive evidence for the presence of suids in Europe within the 1.8-to-1.2-million-years-ago interval, while Iannucci (2025) reaffirms his original interpretation of the fossil from Peyrolles.
- A study on the limb bones of chevrotains from the Early Miocene sites in Napak (Uganda) is published by Musalizi & Rössner (2024), who report that extinct and extant chevrotains have overall similar limb morphology, except for the metapodials.
- A study on the morphological diversity of metapodials of extant and fossil giraffids is published by Martino et al. (2024).
- Raza et al. (2024) describe new giraffid material from the Chinji and Dhok Pathan formations (Pakistan), interpreted as indicative of the presence of mixed woodland habitats in the Siwaliks during the Miocene.
- Laskos & Kostopoulos (2024) review the fossil material of members of the genus Palaeogiraffa, interpreting it as a genus distinct from other Late Miocene giraffids, likely related to the sivatherine lineage.
- Ríos et al. (2024) describe fossil material of juvenile specimens of Decennatherium rex from the Vallesian strata from Batallones-10 (Torrejón de Velasco, Madrid Basin, Spain), providing new information on the ontogeny of this species.
- Laskos & Kostopoulos (2024) describe new fossil material of Palaeotragus inexspectatus from Villafranchian localities in Greece, and interpret almost all fossils of Villafranchian Eurasian giraffids as belonging to members of a single species of Palaeotragus, P. inexspectatus.
- Ţibuleac et al. (2024) describe fossil material of Samotherium major and Helladotherium duvernoyi from the Late Miocene outcrops of the Eastern Carpathians Foreland (Romania), linking Late Miocene giraffid faunas from southern Balkans and faunas from Hungary, Moldova and Ukraine, and providing possible evidence of existence of a Miocene migration pathway.
- The most complete snout of a fossil deer in South America reported to date is described from the late Pleistocene strata from the Pampas Region by Aranciaga-Rolando et al. (2024), who assign the studied fossil material to Morenelaphus, and interpret Morenelaphus as a member of Cervinae.
- A study on the ecology of Haploidoceros mediterraneus is published by Uzunidis et al. (2024), who interpret the studied cervid as a mixed-feeder during the Middle Pleistocene, with a shift toward a more browse-specialized diet during the Late Pleistocene.
- A study on the fossil material of the Pleistocene Dama-like deer from Pirro Nord (Italy), providing evidence of endocranial morphology indicative of closer relationship with extant fallow deers than with other Pleistocene forms and evidence of adaptations for grass-rich diet in open habitats, is published by Strani et al. (2024).
- A study on changes of the distribution of the European fallow deer throughout its evolutionary history, as indicated by ancient and modern DNA, is published by Baker et al. (2024), who report that, although the range of this species covered most of Europe during the Eemian interglacial, it retreated to southern refugia during the last glacial period and did not disperse north afterwards, but rather was translocated by humans.
- A study on the distribution of the European and Persian fallow deers throughout the last 10,000 years, as inferred from zooarchaeological and biomolecular analysis of ancient and modern remains, historical sources and iconography, is published by Baker et al. (2024), who interpret their findings as indicating that after the Last Glacial Maximum the European fallow deer was likely restricted to Anatolia and the Balkans, while the range of the Persian fallow deer extended further west than previously proposed, as it was present at the Bronze Age/early Iron Age sites of Kinet Höyük and Kilise Tepe (Anatolia, Turkey).
- Gamarra et al. (2024) describe a femur of a member of the genus Eucladoceros from the Pliocene (Villafranchian) site Podari (Romania), preserving evidence of hindlimb adaptations to cursorial locomotion in open environments.
- Vislobokova (2024) describes fossil material of Eucladoceros orientalis from the Pleistocene strata from the Taurida Cave in Crimea, and interprets the morphology of the studied remains as supporting its assignment to the genus Eucladoceros.
- Vislobokova (2024) reports the discovery of fossil material of Arvernoceros verestchagini and Megaloceros cf. stavropolensis from the Pleistocene strata from the Taurida Cave (Crimea).
- A study on the tooth wear in fossil bovids from the Tugen Hills Succession of the Baringo Basin (Kenya) is published by Greiner et al. (2024), who interpret their findings as indicative of increase of mixed-feeding behaviors in post-Miocene bovids.
- New fossil material of Miocene bovids is described from five localities from the Middle Siwalik (Pakistan) by Naz et al. (2024), who interpret the studied fossils as indicative of moist environment with abundant small bodies of standing water.
- A study on the distribution, anatomy and affinities of late Miocene Eurasian bovids that resembled extant muskox in their skeletal morphology is published by Ilyas et al. (2024).
- Bai, Dong & Zhang (2024) describe fossil material of members of the genus Euceratherium from the Pleistocene strata in the Gonghe Basin, Nihewan Basin and Xinyaozi Ravine (China), representing the first record of members of the genus outside North America reported to date.
- Redescription of the brain anatomy of Myotragus balearicus is published by Liakopoulou, Roussiakis & Lyras (2024).
- Study on the relationship between distal humerus morphology and habitat preference, body mass and tribe affiliation in extant bovids is published by Anderson, Kovarovic & Barr (2024), who also study the humerus morphology of Rusingoryx atopocranion, support its assignment to the tribe Alcelaphini, and interpret it as adapted for life in open grassland habitats.
- Stefanelli et al. (2024) identify fossil material of Bison cf. schoetensacki from the Middle Pleistocene site of Contrada Monticelli (Apulia, Italy), representing the southernmost record of the species in Europe reported to date.
- A study on tooth wear of Middle and Late Pleistocene steppe bisons from Eurasia and Alaska is published by Hofman-Kamińska et al. (2024), who interpret steppe bisons as mixed feeders living in a variety of different environments rather than specialized grazers.
- A study on the dietary ecology of bisons from the Pleistocene North America, as indicated by isotopic data from tooth enamel, is published by Hardy & Rowland (2024), who find evidence of mixed feeding behavior in Bison latifrons and Bison antiquus, interpreted as feeding on C_{4} plants but incorporating C_{3} plants into their diets when available.
- A study on the evolutionary history of East Asian aurochs, as indicated by data from genomes of Late Pleistocene and Holocene specimens from the Songnen Plain and the Yaowuyao site (China), is published by Hou et al. (2024).
- A study on the evolutionary history of the aurochs, as indicated by ancient genomic data, is published by Rossi et al. (2024).
- The holotype specimen of a purported phocid Afrophoca libyca is reinterpreted as a bone of the anthracothere Afromeryx zelteni by Pickford & De Muizon (2024).
- Fidalgo et al. (2024) review the fossil record of hippopotamids on the Iberian Peninsula during the Quaternary, an interpret the fossil record as suggestive of a brief coexistence of Hippopotamus antiquus and the hippopotamus close to the extinction of the former species.
- Romano, Manucci & Bellucci (2024) provide estimates of body mass of a specimen of Hippopotamus antiquus mounted on display at the Museum of Geology and Palaeontology of the University of Florence, recovering an average value for the body mass of approximately 3170 kg.
- Martino et al. (2024) describe fossil material of Hippopotamus cf. antiquus from Malagrotta, and interpret this finding as indicative of longer survival of the species in central Italy than in Portugal and Greece, i.e. slightly after 450,000 years ago.
- Martino et al. (2024) describe a mandible of the hippopotamus from the Fosso Malafede site (Latium, Italy) and revise the fossil record of the hippopotamus from southern Europe, interpreting the species as spread in the Italian Peninsula during the MIS 7.
- Review of the fossil record of Italian hippopotamids from the Middle Pleistocene is published by Mecozzi et al. (2024).
- Patel et al. (2024) describe the anatomy of the skull of Indohyus indirae, reporting evidence of the presence of a combination of features seen in terrestrial even-toed ungulates, Eocene cetaceans and more recent, aquatic cetaceans.
- New cranial material of Khirtharia, providing new information on the skull anatomy of this raoellid, is described by Waqas et al. (2024).
- Waqas et al. (2024) reconstruct the endocranial cast of Khirtharia inflata.
- Weppe et al. (2024) describe new fossil material of Metkatius kashmiriensis from the Eocene strata from the Upper Subathu Formation (India), providing new information on the morphology of its teeth, and interpret M. kashmiriensis as a taxon distinct from Indohyus indirae.

=== Carnivorans ===
Name	Novelty	Status	Authors	Age	Type locality	Country	Notes	Images
Cernictis baskini	Sp. nov	Valid	Jiangzuo et al.	Miocene		China	A member of the family Mustelidae belonging to the subfamily Ictonychinae and the tribe Ictonychini.	
Fejfarictis	Gen. et sp. nov	Valid	De Bonis et al.	Oligocene		Czech Republic	An early aeluroid. The type species is F. valecensis.	
Lutravus dianensis	Sp. nov	Valid	Jiangzuo et al.	Miocene		China	A member of the family Mustelidae belonging to the subfamily Ictonychinae and the tribe Lyncodontini.	
Magerifelis	Gen. et sp. nov		Salesa et al.	Miocene		France; Spain	A medium-sized feline. The type species is M. peignei.	
Magophoca	Gen. et sp. nov	Valid	Dewaele & de Muizon	Miocene (Tortonian)	Pisco Formation	Peru	A monachine seal belonging to the tribe Lobodontini. The type species is M. brevirostris.	
Ontocetus posti	Sp. nov	Valid	Boisville, Chatar & Kohno	Pliocene and Pleistocene		Belgium; United Kingdom	A pinniped belonging to the family Odobenidae.	
Palaeoenydris	Subgen. nov.	Valid	Baryshnikov	Pliocene		France	Subgenus of genus Lutra, type species Lutra bravardi Pomel, 1843 (type locality Perrier-Etouaires, France; Late Pliocene)	
Paludolutrina	Subtribe nov.	Valid	Baryshnikov	Late Miocene			Subtribus of tribus Enhydriodontini Morales et Pickford, 2005 (of subfamily Lutrinae), type genus Paludolutra Hürzeler, 1987	
Prionailurus kurteni	Sp. nov	Valid	Jiangzuo et al.	Pleistocene		China	A species of Prionailurus.	
Semigenetta qiae	Sp. nov	Valid	Wang et al.	Miocene	Lufeng Basin	China	A member of the family Viverridae belonging to the subfamily Genettinae.	
Semigenetta thailandica	Sp. nov	Valid	Wang et al.	Miocene	Na Khaem Formation	Thailand	A member of the family Viverridae belonging to the subfamily Genettinae.	
Seronectes	Gen. et sp. nov		Hafed et al.	Neogene		United States (North Carolina)	A monachine seal. The type species is S. meherrinensis.	
Shansictis	Gen. et sp. nov	Valid	Jiangzuo et al.	Miocene		China	A member of the family Mustelidae belonging to the subfamily Ictonychinae and the tribe Lyncodontini. The type species is S. xinzhouensis.	
Valenictus sheperdi	Sp. nov		Boessenecker et al.	Pliocene	Purisima Formation	United States (California)		
Zdanskia	Gen. nov.	Valid	Baryshnikov	Late Miocene		China	Type species Lutra aonychoides Zdansky, 1924 (Baode Bassin, locality 49, Jijiagou)	

==== Carnivoran research ====
- Kargopoulos et al. (2024) revise the carnivoran material from the Neogene of eastern Romania, reporting the presence of Pristifelis attica, a member of the genus Paludolutra (extending known geographic range of both taxa) and Protictitherium crassum (providing evidence of the presence of the species in central-eastern Europe after the transition from the Vallesian to the Turolian), and redescribe the type material of Lutra? rumana and "Promephitis" malustenensis.
- Kargopoulos et al. (2024) study the Miocene carnivoran guilds from the Hammerschmiede clay pit (Germany), providing evidence of the presence of a carnivoran fauna distinct from faunas from other Miocene localities from Europe, living in the ecosystem with diverse resources where the majority of carnivoran species occupied distinct niches and avoided competition.
- Madurell-Malapeira et al. (2024) review the fossil record of the latest Early Pleistocene carnivorans from the Vallparadís Section from the Vallès-Penedès Basin (Spain), reporting the last appearances of long-surviving genera such as Megantereon and Xenocyon, as well evidence of the initial dispersals of African carnivorans such as steppe lions into the European landscape.
- A mandible of a probable member of the genus Magericyon, likely representing a new species, is described from the Miocene Linxia Basin (China) by Jiangzuo et al. (2024), expanding known diversity of amphicyonids from eastern Asia.
- A study on the allometry of the baculum in extant and extinct canids is published by de Latorre & Marshall (2024).
- Pickford et al. (2024) describe fossil material of the bat-eared fox or a related species from the Pleistocene strata from the Otavi Mountainland (Namibia), interpret this finding as possible evidence of reduction in body size in the bat-eared fox lineage since the Pleistocene, and argue that this lineage likely evolved exclusively within Africa.
- Thabard & Fourvel (2024) revise canid material from the Minnaar's Cave (South Africa) and interpret Canis antiquus as a junior synonym of the side-striped jackal.
- Lavrov et al. (2024) describe fossil material of Canis etruscus from the Pleistocene strata from the Taurida Cave (Crimea), representing the first record of the species from the northern Black Sea region.
- Bartolini-Lucenti et al. (2024) present a virtual reconstruction of the lectotype specimen of Canis arnensis.
- A study on genomes of Japanese wolves and dogs is published by Gojobori et al. (2024), who interpret their findings as indicating that the Japanese wolf was the closest known relative of the extinct gray wolf population which was ancestral to dogs, as well as indicative of an ancient genomic introgression from the Japanese wolf ancestry to dogs which likely happened before the dog's arrival in the Japanese archipelago.
- A study on large canid specimens from Pleistocene and Holocene sites in interior Alaska is published by Lanoë et al. (2024), who find evidence of association of diverse canids with people and evidence of diverse ecological relationships of canids and people, including evidence that a canid individual from the Swan Point Archaeological Site (likely related to ancient arctic wolves from Zhokhov Island, but showing no relationship with known dog clades) was fed salmon in similar proportions to Holocene dogs, and that early Holocene large canids from the Hollembaek's Hill site (ranging in size from moderate to wolf-sized) were pet wolves and/or domesticated dogs, but also possible evidence of people hunting canids such as coyotes.
- Kargopoulos et al. (2024) describe fossil material of Kretzoiarctos beatrix from the Miocene strata from the Hammerschmiede clay pit (Germany), representing the first record of this species outside the Iberian Peninsula reported to date, and interpret the diet of K. beatrix as likely closer to that of the extant spectacled bear than to that of the giant panda.
- A study on the evolution of teeth of the giant panda is published by Jiangzuo et al. (2024), who find no evidence of significant differences between teeth of different members of the genus Ailuropoda, and argue that the basic function of the giant panda teeth was constant since the Early Pleistocene.
- Villalba de Alvarado et al. (2024) describe new fossil material of the Asian black bear from the Pleistocene sites in Spain, including postcranial remains which fit within the range of morphological variation of extant members of the species.
- Villalba de Alvarado et al. (2024) describe new fossil material of Ursus deningeri from the Salbatore II cave site (Spain), providing new information on the morphological variability of members of this species.
- A study on tooth wear in Middle and Late Pleistocene cave bears from the Kudaro 1 and Kudaro 3 caves (South Ossetia) is published by Duñó-Iglesias et al. (2024), who report evidence indicating that diets of the studied bears changed over time in response to changes of climatic and ecological conditions.
- Kastelic Kovačič et al. (2024) present a novel approach to sampling dental collagen which can be used to determine the diet and behavior of cave bears throughout their life, and apply their methods to cave bears remains from the Divje babe I cave (Slovenia), interpreting their findings as indicative of differences in the carbon isotope values from tooth collagen of hibernating individuals and those that failed to hibernate, as well as indicating that the juvenile cave bears did not suckle milk after the first hibernation.
- A study on the paleobiology of cave bears from the Kletno Bear Cave (Poland), providing evidence of episodes of malnutrition affecting young bears, of forelimb fractures and of diseases such as tuberculosis, abscesses and rickets, is published by Marciszak et al. (2024).
- A study on the mandibular morphology of cave bears from the Scladina cave (Belgium) and extant bears is published by Charters et al. (2024), who interpret morphological changes in the mandibles of the studied cave bears through time as adaptations to environmental changes.
- Faggi et al. (2024) describe new fossil material of Meles thorali from the Early Pleistocene locality Saint-Vallier (France), and interpret M. thorali as a taxon distinct from the European badger and closely related to Meles teilhardi.
- Sánchez et al. (2024) describe fossil material of Ischyrictis bezianensis from the Early Miocene of Baigneaux (France) and fossil material of I. zibethoides from the Middle Miocene of La Retama (Spain), representing the first known record of the latter species from the Iberian Peninsula reported to date.
- Marciszak & Nagel (2024) revise fossil material of martens from the Pleistocene sites Deutsch Altenburg 2 and 4 (Austria), interpreting the studied fossils as most likely belonging to members of only one species, Martes vetus.
- Faggi, Bartolini-Lucenti & Rook (2024) describe new fossil material of Tyrrhenolutra from the Late Miocene localities in Italy and interpret Tyrrhenolutra helbingi as a junior synonym of "Paludolutra" maremmana, resulting in a new combination Tyrrhenolutra maremmana.
- A study on the phylogenetic relationships and evolutionary history of extant and fossil pan-pinnipeds is published by Park et al. (2024).
- A study on the vertebral columns of extant pinnipeds and fossil stem pinnipeds, providing evidence of a shift from the evolution of diverse vertebral morphotypes to the constrained evolution of the vertebral column at the time of the major radiation of crown pinnipeds approximately 10–12 million years ago, is published by Esteban et al. (2024).
- Rule, Burin & Park (2024) find that ecomorphotype groupings are not reliably useful for assigning isolated earless seal fossils to known or new taxa, and consider the majority of extinct earless seal species to be nomina dubia.
- Valenzuela-Toro, Gutstein & Suárez (2024) describe new fossil material of earless seals from the Bahía Inglesa Formation (Chile), including the first record of Hadrokirus martini outside Peru, a member of the genus Acrophoca morphologically distinguishable from A. longirostris, and four indeterminate seals with considerable morphological differences from known contemporaneous taxa.
- A study on the evolution of the morphological diversity of feliforms, based on data from extant and fossil taxa, is published by Barrett & Hopkins (2024).
- A study on the morphological diversity of the upper canine teeth of the saber-tooth feliforms is published by Shelbourne & Lautenschlager (2024).
- Lipecki et al. (2024) describe fossil material of Megaviverra carpathorum from the Pliocene site Węże 1 (Poland), expanding known geographical range of the species, interpret the fossil record of this species as evidence of temporary (3.8–2.8 million years ago) presence of large viverrids in Europe, and consider the appearance of canids belonging to the genus Canis to be most likely main cause of the extinction of large European viverrids.
- Evidence indicating that Late Pleistocene cave lions and cave hyenas from the Baikal-Yenisei Siberia were predominantly confined to different landscapes is presented by Malikov et al. (2024).
- A study on the ecomorphology of Ictitherium ebu is published by van der Hoek & Werdelin (2024), who interpret I. ebu as unlikely to be cursorial, and interpret its long slender limbs as likely indicative of ecology similar to that of the maned wolf.
- A study on teeth of members of the hyaenid lineages leading to the brown hyena and Pachycrocuta brevirostris and on their phylogenetic relationships is published by Pérez-Claros (2024), who interprets Pachycrocuta perrieri as ancestral to P. brevirostris in Eurasia and to the brown hyena in Africa, and proposes the inclusion the brown hyena and "Hyaena" prisca into the genus Pachycrocuta.
- Evidence from the study of genomic data from a Late Pleistocene coprolite from Sicily (Italy), indicating that the Sicilian cave hyena belonged to a basal lineage of cave hyenas and was less admixed with the African spotted hyena than mainland European cave hyenas were, is presented by Catalano et al. (2024).
- A study on the tempo and mode of evolution of the skull of nimravids and felids is published by Chatar et al. (2024), who find evidence of a continuous spectrum of shape variation in the cranium and mandible rather than a distinctive sabertooth morphology, and find that sabertooth adaptations arose in clades with less integrated skulls.
- A study on the cranial mechanics of Barbourofelis fricki and Smilodon fatalis is published by Figueirido, Tucker & Lautenschlager (2024), who interpret the skull of B. fricki as overall more stress-resistant than the skull of S. fatalis, with the latter taxon experiencing lower stresses only in a stabbing scenario, and interpret their findings as suggestive of different killing behavior of the studied taxa.
- Salesa et al. (2024) provide evidence of specimens of Machairodus aphanistus from the Miocene of Cerro de los Batallones (Spain) being affected by bone pathologies that reduced their hunting abilities, and interpret the temporary survival of the studied individuals in spite of the pathologies as consistent with existence of a degree of sociality in M. aphanistus that might have given the affected individuals access to carcasses hunted by other members of the species.
- Manzuetti et al. (2024) provide body mass estimates of cf. Xenosmilus sp. from the Raigón Formation (Uruguay), representing the largest homotherine in South America by the Early-Middle Pleistocene and one of the largest sabertooth cats reported to date.
- Moretti et al. (2024) describe fossil material of a member of the genus Homotherium from the McFaddin Beach (Texas, United States), interpreted as likely originating from submerged deposits on the continental shelf in the Gulf of Mexico that were exposed in the Late Pleistocene.
- Lopatin et al. (2024) report the discovery of a frozen mummy of a large cub of Homotherium latidens the Upper Pleistocene permafrost in the northeast of Sakha Republic (Russia).
- Stimpson (2024) revises fossil material of Megantereon from the Siwaliks (India), and confirms Megantereon falconeri as a distinct species.
- Tura-Poch et al. (2024) describe a partial neurocranium of member of the genus Megantereon from the latest early Pleistocene (approximately 1 million years old) from the Vallparadís Composite Section (Vallès-Penedès Basin, Spain), representing the most recent record of Megantereon in Western Europe, and interpret the disappearance of European Megantereon as likely related to the climatic shifts associated with the Early-Middle Pleistocene transition.
- A study on the facial anatomy of Megantereon is published by Antón et al. (2024), who interpret elongated upper canines of Megantereon as likely exposed during the animal's life.
- A study on bending strength and stiffness changes during the eruption of the adult canines in Smilodon fatalis is published by Tseng (2024), who find evidence of decrease of bending stiffness of the adult canines during their eruption, but also finds that retention of the deciduous canines helped to effectively overcome the reduced bending stiffness of the adult canines.
- Evidence indicating that Smilodon fatalis underwent a shift in mandibular shape related to the eruption of the lower carnassial later in its ontogeny than extant lions do, and reached high efficiency to perform an anchor bite late in its ontogeny, is presented by Chatar et al. (2024), who argue that juveniles of S. fatalis might have remained under parental care longer than lions do.
- A study on the gape and bite force of Smilodon fatalis, providing estimates of bite force similar to that of the jaguar, is published by Deutsch et al. (2024)
- Rodrigues-Oliveira et al. (2024) recover complete mitogenomes of Homotherium latidens and Smilodon populator.
- Serdyuk et al. (2024) describe remains of Lynx issiodorensis from the Early Pleistocene strata from the Taurida cave in Crimea with a fused fracture of the metacarpals interpreted as resulting from a healed injury that likely subsequently limited hunting abilities of the affected individual.
- Jiangzuo et al. (2024) describe new fossil material of Acinonyx pleistocaenicus from the Middle Pleistocene strata in Zhoukoudian and in the Jinyuan Cave (China), representing the latest and the largest-bodied member of the species; the authors consider A. pleistocaenicus to be a species distinct from Acinonyx pardinensis, and interpret Acinonyx intermedius as migrating from Africa into Asia around the Early-Middle Pleistocene boundary and replacing A. pleistocaenicus.
- The first fossil material of Acinonyx pardinensis from Crimea is described from the Early Pleistocene strata from the Taurida cave by Gimranov et al. (2024).
- Sherani & Sherani (2024) interpret a mandible of a member of the genus Panthera from the Kedung Brubus site (Java, Indonesia) as the first evidence of the presence of Panthera gombaszoegensis in the Middle Pleistocene Sunda.
- Review of the distribution of Panthera spelaea in Eurasia and North America throughout its evolutionary history is published by Puzachenko et al. (2024).

=== Chiropterans ===
Name	Novelty	Status	Authors	Age	Type locality	Country	Notes	Images
Plecotus macrobullaris sarmaticus	Ssp. nov		Lopatin	Pleistocene		Crimea	A subspecies of the Alpine long-eared bat.	

==== Chiropteran research ====
- A study on the evolution of limbs traits of bats, based on data from fossil bats and from extant mammals with diverse locomotor modes, is published by Burtner et al. (2024),
- A study on the phylogenetic relationships of Paleogene bats is published by Jones, Beard & Simmons (2024).
- Giannini et al. (2024) study the flight capabilities of Onychonycteris finneyi and modeled intermediate bat forms, find O. finneyi to be capable of both gliding and flapping flight, and find the ability of the modeled intermediate forms to switch from gliding to flapping fight to be facilitated by denser atmosphere estimated for the Eocene.

=== Eulipotyphlans ===
Name	Novelty	Status	Authors	Age	Type locality	Country	Notes	Images
Anourosorex andabata	Sp. nov	Valid	Lopatin	Pleistocene		Vietnam	An Asian mole shrew.	
Archaeodesmana dissona	Sp. nov	Valid	Cailleux, van den Hoek Ostende & Joniak	Miocene		Slovakia	A desman.	
Solenodon ottenwalderi	Sp. nov		Viñola-López et al.	Quaternary		Haiti	A solenodon.	
Talpa masinii	Sp. nov	Valid	Marchetti	Villanyian		Italy	A mole, a species of Talpa.	

==== Eulipotyphlan research ====
- A study on the evolutionary history of shrews, based on data from extant and fossil members of the group, is published by Yuan et al. (2024).
- Averianov & Voyta (2024) reinterpret fossil material of a putative Triassic stem mammal Tikitherium copei as a tooth of a Neogene shrew.
- Furió, Minwer-Barakat & García-Alix (2024) reinterpret fossil material of putative European afrosoricid Europotamogale melkarti as remains of a water-mole of the genus Archaeodesmana.
- Taxonomic revision of the fossil material of Late Pleistocene and Holocene shrews from the Koridornaya Cave (Russian Far East) is published by Omelko & Tiunov (2024).

=== Perissodactyls ===
Name	Novelty	Status	Authors	Age	Type locality	Country	Notes	Images
Cormohipparion cappadocium	Sp. nov	Valid	Bernor et al.	Miocene		Turkey		
Megacanodon	Gen. et sp. nov		Lu et al.	Oligocene	Jiaozigou Formation	China	A member of Rhinocerotoidea. The type species is M. dongxiangense.	
Plesiaceratherium tongxinense	Sp. nov	Valid	Sun, Deng & Wang	Miocene		China	An aceratheriine rhinoceros.	

==== Perissodactyl research ====
- Kampouridis et al. (2024) describe fossil material of a member of the genus Anisodon and an indeterminate schizotheriine from the Hammerschmiede clay pit (Germany), and interpret the presence of chalicotheriine and schizotheriine remains in different horizons in Hammerschmiede as indicating that chalicotheriines and schizotheriines preferred different environments.
- Kampouridis et al. (2024) describe fossil material of Ancylotherium pentelicum from the Late Miocene locality of Maragheh (Iran), representing the easternmost record of this species reported to date.
- A study on the impact of the environmental changes during the Oligocene–Miocene transition on rhinocerotids from Western Europe is published by Hullot et al. (2024).
- A tooth of a large herbivorous mammal from the Diahot region of New Caledonia, which was identified by different authors either as a tooth of a rhinoceros or a tooth of the marsupial Zygomaturus diahotensis, is identified by Affholder, Antoine & Beck (2024) as a tooth of Brachypotherium brachypus that was taken to New Caledonia by a European colonist in the 19th century.
- A study on the ecology of Mesaceratherium paulhiacense and Protaceratherium minutum from the Miocene (Aquitanian) Ulm-Westtangente locality (Germany) is published by Hullot et al. (2024), who interpret their findings as indicative of different feeding preferences of the studied species.
- Li et al. (2024) describe new fossil material of Pliorhinus ringstroemi from the Miocene deposits from the Linxia Basin (China), providing new information on the skeletal anatomy of this species, interpret P. ringstroemi as a distinct species related to P. megarhinus and P. miguelcrusafonti, and argue that Pliorhinus might have originated in Asia and migrated to Europe at the latest Miocene.
- Longuet et al. (2024) describe new rhinocerotid material from the Miocene Irrawaddy Formation (Myanmar), including the oldest fossil record of a member of the genus Dicerorhinus in Southeast Asia reported to date.
- A study on the ecology of members of the genus Coelodonta from East Asia, as inferred from stable carbon and oxygen isotope data from their remains, is published by Ma, Wang & Deng (2024), who report evidence of flexible foraging ecologies of Coelodonta nihowanensis in different environments it lived in, and interpret Coelodonta thibetana and the woolly rhinoceros as more likely to be grazers.
- Boeskorov et al. (2024) describe a subadult woolly rhinoceros mummy from the permafrost of Yakutia (Russia), confirming the presence of a hump (likely filled with white fat) in the neck and withers area of members of this species.
- A study on the biology and ecology of the woolly rhinoceros across Northern and Western Europe during the last glaciation event is published by Hullot et al. (2024).
- Fordham et al. (2024) reconstruct population dynamics of the woolly rhinoceros, and interpret its extinction as caused by combination of climate-driven habitat fragmentation and low but sustained hunting by humans.
- Evidence of a close phylogenetic relationship between "Hipparion" plocodus from the Miocene strata in the Baode area (Shanxi, China) and European hipparion species "Hippotherium" malpassii is presented by Sun et al. (2024).
- A study on the fossil record of Miocene and Pliocene horses from the Upper Bone Valley Formation (Florida, United States) is published by Killingsworth & MacFadden (2024), who interpret their findings as indicating that both sampling bias and ecological causes might be responsible for the presence or absence of different horse taxa at fossil sites.
- A study on the tooth wear in the population of Equus simplicidens from the Hagerman Horse Quarry (Idaho, United States), providing evidence of a high-abrasive diet similar to the diets of extant equids, is published by Cirilli, Semprebon & Bernor (2024).
- Evidence from the study of ancient DNA of equids from Anatolia, the Caucasian region, Iran, Central Asia and Mongolia (including a Pleistocene European wild ass specimen from the Emine-Bair-Khosar Cave in Crimea and specimens of Equus ovodovi from Mongolia that were previously misinterpreted as early domestic horses), indicative of the presence of E. ovodovi in Mongolia approximately 3,900 years ago and of close phylogenetic relationship between European wild ass and Asian wild asses, is presented by Pan et al. (2024).

=== Other laurasiatherians ===
Name	Novelty	Status	Authors	Age	Type locality	Country	Notes	Images
Caenophilus zeballensis	Sp. nov	Valid	Fernández, Bond & Fernicola	Miocene	Collón Curá Formation	Argentina	A notoungulate belonging to the family Interatheriidae.	
Carodnia karuen	Sp. nov	Valid	Gelfo, López & Bond	Paleocene	Peñas Coloradas Formation	Argentina	A member of Xenungulata.	
Militocodon	Gen. et sp. nov		Weaver et al.	Paleocene (Danian)	Denver Formation	United States (Colorado)	A member of the family Periptychidae belonging to the subfamily Conacodontinae. The type species is M. lydae.	
Orienspterodon mianchiensis	Sp. nov	Valid	Sheng, Bi & Li	Eocene	Heti Formation	China	A member of Hyaenodonta belonging to the family Hyainailouridae.	
Talquinodus	Gen. et sp. nov		Kramarz et al.	Eocene	Sarmiento Formation	Argentina	An archaic South American ungulate of uncertain affinities. The type species is T. puertai.	

==== Miscellaneous laurasiatherian research ====
- Faurby et al. (2024) reconstruct the phylogeny of Carnivoramorpha (including extant and fossil carnivorans), Hyaenodonta and Oxyaenidae, and find that inclusion of fossil taxa in the study of biogeography results in more precise and accurate reconstruction of the ancestral areas of the studied groups.
- A study on changes of body mass and of the relative blade length of the lower first molar of North American "creodonts" and carnivorans throughout the Cenozoic is published by Juhn et al. (2024), who find evidence of evolution of more blade-like molars in response to the appearance of more open environments as a result of climate changes.
- Tseng & DeSantis (2024) study the relationship between tooth wear and biomechanical performance of the mandible in Hyaenodon and extant carnivorans, and report evidence indicating that mechanical efficiency of canine bite of Hyaenodon increased with tooth wear (unlike extant bone cracking carnivorans, as they show carnassial mechanical efficiency increasing with tooth wear), providing no support for the interpretation of Hyaenodon as ecological equivalent of extant hyaenids.
- Evidence indicating that the morphology of the humerus can be used to determine the habitat of fossil carnivorans and ungulates is presented by Serio et al. (2024).
- Abbassi et al. (2024) describe an assemblage of vertebrate footprints from the Oligocene Lower Red Formation (Iran), including footprints of possible members of Tapiroidea and large carnivores (possibly amphicyonids or ursids), and name new ichnotaxa Dehnaripus incognitus and Moropopus kashanensis.
- Description and taxonomic revision of ungulate fossils from the Nagri and Dhok Pathan formations of the Middle Siwalik subgroup (Pakistan) is published by Ara et al. (2024), who interpret the studied fossils as suggestive of the presence of environment including a massive open land with variable wet and dry seasons during the Late Miocene.
- A study on the skeletal anatomy of Triisodon crassicuspis, based on data from a new specimen from the Paleocene Nacimiento Formation (New Mexico, United States), is published by Toosey et al. (2024), who interpret Triisodon as a terrestrial mammal with digging abilities and beginnings of adaptations of teeth to carnivory (including large canines with a shearing edge), though without specializations such as carnassial blades or reduction of number of premolars and molars seen in extant hypercarnivorous carnivorans.
- The first skull of a Paleocene member of the genus Hapalodectes reported to date, attributed to H. dux, is described from the Naran Bulak Formation (Mongolia) by Lopatin (2024).
- The first complete mandible of Protolipterna ellipsodontoides is described by Zanesco et al. (2024), who find no evidence of specialization to strict herbivory, and interpret P. ellipsodontoides as a likely omnivore.
- A study on the phylogenetic relationships of litopterns, as indicated by dental by mandibular anatomy, is published Püschel et al. (2024).
- Wilson et al. (2024) describe fossil material of Megadolodus molariformis from the Miocene Ipururo Formation (Peru), representing the southernmost record of the species reported to date, and interpret the diet of megadolodine litopterns as likely similar to that of extant babirusas.
- Badin et al. (2024) describe new proterotheriid material from the Miocene Camacho Formation of Uruguay and the Loma de Las Tapias and Cerro Azul formations of Argentina, and expand the diagnosis of Neobrachytherium ullumense.
- Schmidt, Armella & Bonini (2024) describe new proterotheriid material from the Andalhuala and Corral Quemado formations (Argentina), interpret known distribution of proterotheriid species as confirming a regional ecological distinction between western and eastern parts of northern Argentina during the late Neogene, and consider ?Proterotherium simplicidens to be a junior synonym of Neobrachytherium intermedium.
- Armella, García-López & Croft (2024) describe the cranial morphology of a juvenile individual of Neobrachytherium intermedium from the Pliocene Andalhuala Formation (Argentina), reporting evidence of age-related changes of cranial traits in Neobrachytherium.
- New estimates of the body mass of Neolicaphrium recens are presented by Corona et al. (2024).
- Badin et al. (2024) describe new fossil material of Neolicaphrium recens from the Late Pleistocene Sopas Formation and from the Late Pleistocene-Early Holocene Dolores Formation (Uruguay), providing new information on the anatomy of members of this species.
- A study on the phylogenetic relationships of macraucheniids is published by Lobo, Gelfo & Azevedo (2024).
- New information on the anatomy of the skull of Oxyodontherium zeballosi is presented by Hernández Del Pino et al. (2024).
- A study on the diversification dynamics of notoungulates through time, providing evidence of impact of biotic and abiotic factors on speciation and extinction rates, is published by Solórzano, Núñez-Flores & Rodríguez-Serrano (2024).
- A study on changes in the skull and teeth of Coquenia bondi during its ontogeny is published by Deraco, Abdala & García-López (2024).
- A study on tooth wear in Taubatherium paulacoutoi, providing evidence of a diet dominated by non-abrasive foods, is published by Wilson & Saarinen (2024).
- Evidence from the study of tooth enamel carbon isotope composition in Miocene to Pleistocene toxodontids from Argentina, interpreted as indicative of gradual shift from the consumption of C_{3} plants to C_{4} plants, is presented by Sanz-Pérez et al. (2024).
- Ferrero et al. (2024) describe fossil material of Posnanskytherium desaguaderoi from the Pliocene Tafna Formation, representing the first record of the genus Posnanskytherium from Argentina and the southernmost record of this genus reported to date.
- Description of bone pathologies of two specimens of Toxodon platensis, including the first report of osteomyelitis in a notoungulate, is published by Luna et al. (2024).
- A study on shape and size variations in lower molars of Toxodon platensis is published by Costamagna et al. (2024), who report evidence of shape variations in populations from different parts of South America which might be related to the type of vegetation consumed by members of the studied populations.
- The first fossil material of a notoungulate from the Miocene Toro Negro Formation (La Rioja, Argentina), assigned to the species Hemihegetotherium achathaleptum, is described by Ruiz-Ramoni et al. (2024).
- Fossil material of Typotheriopsis chasicoensis, representing the first confidently identified mammal fossil material from the Miocene La Pilona Formation (Argentina) and providing new information on the postcranial anatomy of the studied mesotheriid, is described by Cerdeño et al. (2024).
- Fernández-Monescillo & Tauber (2024) report evidence indicative of decline in the size and body mass in the last known population of Mesotherium cristatum from the Bonaerian of the Corralito site (Argentina), interpreted as related to environmental changes in South America during the Pleistocene which caused reduction of the distribution area of M. cristatum.
- Armella et al. (2024) describe new notoungulate material from the India Muerta Formation (Tucumán Province, Argentina), including fossils of two toxodontids, one mesotheriid and four hegetotheriids, and interpret the studied fossils as indicative of Tortonian age of the fossiliferous levels of the India Muerta Formation.
- Folino et al. (2024) describe the most complete juvenile mandible of Pyrotherium reported to date, providing new information on the morphology of its deciduous teeth.
- 15 reports about exceptionally well-preserved paleoparadoxiid desmostylian from Gifu Prefecture, Japan are published, this specimen is called as "Paleoparadoxiid Mizunami-Kamado specimen", known from Lower Miocene Shukunohara Formation. Reports include estimation of age, osteology, classification, accompanied biota, skeletal and life reconstructions.

== Xenarthrans ==
=== Cingulatans ===
Name	Novelty	Status	Authors	Age	Type locality	Country	Notes	Images
Parutaetus oliveirai	Sp. nov		Klimeck et al.	Eocene	Guabirotuba Formation	Brazil	An armadillo belonging to the subfamily Euphractinae.	

==== Cingulatan research ====
- Núñez-Blasco et al. (2024) revise fossil material of glyptodonts belonging to the tribe Plohophorini from the Neogene Villavil-Quillay Basin (Catamarca Province, Argentina), assign the studied fossils to the single species Stromaphorus ameghini living from the latest Miocene to the Pliocene, and transfer "Panochthus" trouessarti Moreno (1888) to the genus Stromaphorus.
- Asakura & Oliveira (2024) study the histology of osteoderms of Glyptotherium, Holmesina, Pachyarmatherium, Pampatherium, Glyptodon and Doedicurus, providing evidence of features which were likely biomechanical adaptations, as well as evidence of similarity of osteoderms of Pachyarmatherium brasiliense and extant armadillos belonging to the group Dasypodinae/Dasipodini, which might be indicative of their phylogenetic affinity.
- Perea (2024) describes new fossil material of Uruguayurus authochthonus from the Pliocene-Pleistocene Raigón Formation (Uruguay), providing new information on the morphological variation within this species.
- The youngest fossil material of members of the glyptodont tribe Palaehoplophorini from Patagonia reported to date is described from the Miocene (Tortonian) strata of the Puerto Madryn Formation (Argentina) by Barasoain et al. (2024).
- Núñez-Blasco et al. (2024) describe fossil material of a member of the genus Eleutherocercus from the Plio/Pleistocene El Polvorín Formation (Argentina), including remains of the caudal tube (part of the body armor including fused tail rings) with the morphology intermediate between caudal tubes of Late Miocene/Pliocene members of the genus Eleutherocercus and the caudal tube of Doedicurus clavicaudatus.
- Luna et al. (2024) describe a caudal vertebra of Panochthus from Late Pleistocene deposits in the Santa Fe Province (Argentina) preserved with pathologies interpreted as related to offensive or defensive use of the tail.
- Barasoain et al. (2024) describe new fossil material of Macrochorobates scalabrinii, providing new information on the anatomy of members of this species, and interpret Macrochorobates chapalmalensis as a likely junior synonym of M. scalabrinii.
- Zurita et al. (2024) report the discovery of a diverse assemblage of members of Cingulata from the Palo Pintado Formation (Argentina), including the first record of a member of the genus Dasypus from the Late Miocene levels of the studied formation.

=== Pilosans ===
==== Pilosan research ====
- Quiñones et al. (2024) describe new fossil material of Simomylodon uccasamamensis from the Pliocene Tafna Formation (Argentina), representing the southernmost record of the species reported to date, and study changes in its morphology associated with ontogeny.
- Lee et al. (2024) describe fossil material of a small-bodied member of the genus Hapalops from the Miocene (Burdigalian) Pampa Castillo site, including the first natural endocast of an extinct mammal from Chile reported to date, and determine the encephalization quotient of the studied sloth as lower than that of extant tree sloths, but higher than that of late Pleistocene ground sloths.
- Review of the nomenclatural history and authorship of Megalonyx and its type species is published by Babcock (2024).
- Fossil material of a probable previously unidentified ground sloth taxon belonging to the genus Nothrotherium is described from the Abismo Ponta de Flecha cave (São Paulo, Brazil) by Chahud et al. (2024).
- Barbosa et al. (2024) report the first case of the calcium pyrophosphate dihydrate crystal deposition disease affecting Nothrotherium maquinense, and interpret this species as having climbing abilities and likely a semi-arboreal lifestyle.

=== General xenarthran research ===
- A study on the relationship between size of nutrient foramina of the femur, body mass and aerobic capacity of extant and extinct xenarthrans is published by Varela, Tambusso & Fariña (2024), who interpret their findings as indicating that large extinct xenarthrans such as glyptodonts and ground sloths had aerobic capacities comparable to those of elephants and ungulates, and likely also indicative of higher maximum metabolic rate of large extinct xenarthrans compared to their extant relatives.

== Other eutherians ==
Name	Novelty	Status	Authors	Age	Type locality	Country	Notes	Images
Nanxiongilambda	Gen. et sp. nov	Valid	Quan & Wang	Paleocene	Nongshan Formation	China	A member of Pantodonta belonging to the family Pantolambdidae. The type species is N. yei.	
Prozalambdalestes	Gen. et sp. nov		Lopatin & Averianov	Early Cretaceous (Aptian–Albian)		Mongolia	A member of the family Zalambdalestidae. The type species is P. cratodus.	
Welcommoides	Gen. et sp. nov	Valid	Solé et al.	Oligocene	Chitarwata Formation	Pakistan	A member of Cimolesta belonging to the group Pantolesta and the family Paroxyclaenidae. The type species is W. gurki.	

=== Miscellaneous eutherian research ===
- A study on cervical vertebrae of Zalambdalestes lechei, providing evidence of axis morphology with no close analog among living mammals, is published by Arnold et al. (2024), who interpret Zalambdalestes as having a neck capable of powerful tugging movements, which might have been used to extract soft-bodied prey from tight hideouts or to immobilize prey through shaking, and argue that Zalambdalestes may have had spinous or bristly fur at the ruff and back.
- Scott (2024) describes fossil material of Huerfanodon sp., cf. H. torrejonius and Psittacotherium sp., cf. P. multifragum representing the first record of taeniodonts from the Paleocene of western Canada reported to date.
- Redescription of the anatomy of the postcranial skeleton of Conoryctes comma is published by Kynigopoulou et al. (2024), who interpret C. comma as a fossorial, scratch-digging mammal.
- Description of the anatomy of the basicranium of Leptictis haydeni is published by Wible & Bertrand (2024).
- A study on the phylogenetic relationships of eutherian mammals, reevaluating the dataset from the study of Velazco et al. (2022) to determine the consequences of using either ordered or unordered morphological characters in a phylogenetic analysis, is published by Brady et al. (2024).
- A study on the evolution of the morphological diversity of limb bones of members of Acreodi, Cimolesta, Dinocerata, Hyaenodonta, Oxyaenodonta and Procreodi, condylarthrans, even- and odd-toed ungulates and carnivorans throughout the Cenozoic is published by Serio et al. (2024), who interpret their findings as indicating that clade interaction and competition rather than abiotic factors were main drivers of the evolution of postcranial morphologies of the studied mammals.

== Metatherians ==
Name	Novelty	Status	Authors	Age	Type locality	Country	Notes	Images
Badjcinus timfaulkneri	Sp. nov		Churchill, Archer, & Hand	Oligocene	Riversleigh World Heritage Area	Australia	A thylacinid.	
Heleocola	Gen. et comb. nov		Eberle et al.	Late Cretaceous (late Campanian—early Maastrichtian)	Williams Fork Formation	United States (Colorado)	A member of Marsupialiformes belonging to the group Pediomyoidea. The type species is "Glasbius" piceanus Cohen, Davis & Cifelli (2020).	
Lemmythentes	Gen. et sp. nov		Martin et al.	Miocene	Collón Curá Formation	Argentina	A member of Paucituberculata. Genus includes new species L. kilmisteri.	
Minusculothentes	Gen. et sp. nov		Martin et al.	Miocene	Collón Curá Formation	Argentina	A member of Paucituberculata. Genus includes new species M. zeballoensis.	
Ngamalacinus nigelmarveni	Sp. nov		Churchill, Archer, & Hand	Oligocene	Riversleigh World Heritage Area	Australia	A thylacinid.	
Nimbacinus peterbridgei	Sp. nov		Churchill, Archer, & Hand	Oligocene	Riversleigh World Heritage Area	Australia	A thylacinid.	
Panchothentes	Gen. et sp. nov		Martin et al.	Miocene	Collón Curá Formation	Argentina	A member of Paucituberculata. Genus includes new species P. goini.	
Peradectes crocheti	Sp. nov		Gernelle et al.	Eocene		France	A peradectid. Subsequently transferred to the genus Europeradectes by Gernelle, Ladevèze & Tabuce (2026).	
Peratherium musivum	Sp. nov	Valid	Gernelle et al.	Eocene		France		
Protemnodon dawsonae	Sp. nov	Valid	Kerr et al.	Pliocene		Australia		
Protemnodon mamkurra	Sp. nov	Valid	Kerr et al.	Pleistocene		Australia		
Protemnodon viator	Sp. nov	Valid	Kerr et al.	Pleistocene		Australia		
Solatherium	Gen. et sp. nov		Gao, Wu & Mao	Late Cretaceous (Campanian)	Nenjiang Formation	China	A "pediomyid" marsupialiform. The type species is S. nenjiangensis.	
Thylacopygmaeus	Gen. et sp. nov		Carneiro et al.	Eocene	Itaboraí Basin	Brazil	A member of the family Herpetotheriidae. The type species is T. oliveirai.	
Xenocynus	Gen. et sp. nov		Carneiro et al.	Eocene	Itaboraí Basin	Brazil	A large-sized marsupialiform belonging to the group Sudameridelphia. The type species is X. crypticus.	
Zeballolagus	Gen. et 2 sp. nov		Martin et al.	Miocene	Collón Curá Formation	Argentina	A member of Polydolopimorphia. Genus includes new species Z. ronniejamesdioi and Z. separatus.	
Zeballothentes	Gen. et sp. nov		Martin et al.	Miocene	Collón Curá Formation	Argentina	A member of Paucituberculata. Genus includes new species Z. incertus.	

=== Metatherian research ===
- A study on the evolutionary history of sparassodonts is published by Prevosti et al. (2024), who interpret geological, environmental and climatic changes in South America since the middle Miocene as the likely main cause of the decline of the studied group.
- Description of the anatomy of the skull of Sipalocyon externus and a study on its paleoecology is published by Gaillard et al. (2024).
- Wessels, van de Weerd & Marković (2024) describe fossil material of herpetotheriids from the early Oligocene strata in southeastern Serbia, representing species which are also known from Western Europe and confirming the ability of herpetotheriids to cross geographical barriers and disperse over large areas.
- Carneiro et al. (2024) describe new fossil material of Carolocoutoia ferigoloi from the Eocene Itaboraí Basin (Brazil), and interpret Carolocoutoia as the sister taxon of Protodidelphis and as a specialized frugivore.
- Carneiro et al. (2024) revise the protodidelphid subfamily Protodidelphinae, interpreting Robertbutleria as a valid genus distinct from Protodidelphis and as a fibrous frugivore.
- Hu et al. (2024) estimate blood flow rates in the femora of extinct kangaroos belonging to the genera Macropus, Protemnodon, Sthenurus, Simosthenurus and Procoptodon, and interpret their findings as suggesting that the locomotion of the studied kangaroos involved applying greater forces to the leg bones compared to the locomotion of extant kangaroos.
- Murphy et al. (2024) study the astragalus of sthenurine and macropodine kangaroos, providing evidence of different patterns of stress on the astragalus in sthenurines and macropodines, as well as in extant and extinct macropodines, which might be related to different patterns of locomotion.
- Redescription of "Silvaroo" buloloensis is published by Kerr & Prideaux (2024), who transfer this species to the genus Dorcopsoides.
- A tooth representing the first fossil material of a member of the genus Protemnodon from the lowland part of New Guinea is described from the Lachitu Cave (Papua New Guinea) by Koungoulos, Flannery & O'Connor (2024).
- Jones & Janis (2024) study the relationship between limb proportions and locomotion in kangaroos, and interpret large species of Protemnodon as most likely predominantly quadrupedal.
- A study on the probable predatory mode of Thylacosmilus and Thylacoleo is published by Janis (2024), who argues that Thylacosmilus was unlikely to be able to kill its prey in the manner similar to the one used by Smilodon, and was more likely to be a specialized scavenger, while Thylacoleo was more likely to have a predatory lifestyle similar to that proposed for sabertoothed placentals.

== Monotremes ==
Name	Novelty	Status	Authors	Age	Type locality	Country	Notes	Images
Dharragarra	Gen. et sp. nov	Valid	Flannery et al.	Late Cretaceous (Cenomanian)	Griman Creek Formation	Australia	The type species is D. aurora.	
Opalios	Gen. et sp. nov	Valid	Flannery et al.	Late Cretaceous (Cenomanian)	Griman Creek Formation	Australia	The type species is O. splendens.	
Parvopalus	Gen. et sp. nov	Valid	Flannery et al.	Late Cretaceous (Cenomanian)	Griman Creek Formation	Australia	The type species is P. clytiei.	

== Other mammals ==
Name	Novelty	Status	Authors	Age	Type locality	Country	Notes	Images
Indotriconodon	Gen. et sp. nov	Valid	Bajpai et al.	Late Cretaceous (Maastrichtian)		India	A member of Eutriconodonta. The type species is I. magnus.	
Ningchengodon	Gen. et sp. nov	Valid	Zhang, Zhou & Luo	Early Cretaceous (Barremian–Aptian)	Yixian Formation	China	A member of Spalacotherioidea. The type species is N. foxi.	
Patagomaia	Gen. et sp. nov	Valid	Chimento et al.	Late Cretaceous (Maastrichtian)	Chorrillo Formation	Argentina	Originally described as a therian mammal of uncertain affinities, with an estimated body mass of 14 kg; Püschel et al. (2024) subsequently argued that Patagomaia might be a large gondwanatherian, possibly synonymous with Magallanodon, but Chimento, Agnolín & Novas (2024) did not consider their arguments to be conclusive. The type species is P. chainko.	
Solanutherium	Gen. et sp. nov		Connelly et al.	Late Cretaceous	Allen Formation	Argentina	A member of Meridiolestida. The type species is S. walshi.	

=== Other mammalian research ===
- Evidence indicating that aspects of both shape and size of the lower fourth premolar can contribute to distinguishing between species belonging to the multituberculate genus Mesodma is presented by Ashbaugh et al. (2024).
- Magallanes et al. (2024) describe a new specimen of Dryolestes priscus from the Upper Jurassic Morrison Formation (Wyoming, United States), and characterize diagnostic features on the molar trigonid of D. priscus and other dryolestids.
- Bishop & Pierce (2024) present reconstructions of the hindlimb musculature of eight non-therian synapsids, including Vincelestes neuquenianus.

== General mammalian research ==
- A study comparing the utility of regression models derived from different skeletal predictors for estimating body mass of Mesozoic mammals is published by Huang et al. (2024).
- A study on the growth of dental cementum in Jurassic mammaliaforms from the Hettangian Hirmeriella fissure suite (Wales, United Kingdom), Bathonian Forest Marble fauna (Oxfordshire, United Kingdom) and the Kimmeridgian Guimarota fauna (Portugal) is published by Newham et al. (2024), who find that none of the studied mammaliaforms (including early crown mammals) reached growth rates and metabolic levels of extant mammals of similar size, but also find evidence of faster growth of early crown mammals compared to earlier mammaliaforms, and argue that the modern mammalian growth strategy evolved at the time of the mid-Jurassic radiation of crown mammals.
- Bishop & Pierce (2024) study the locomotor evolution of synapsids and report evidence indicating that therian-like erect hindlimb function only evolved shortly before the origin of the crown group of therians themselves.
- Evidence from phylogenetic and fossil data, interpreted as indicative of increased speciation rates of mammals before and during the Cretaceous-Paleogene transition, is presented by Quintero, Lartillot & Morlon (2024), who argue that the Cretaceous–Paleogene extinction event filtered out more slowly speciating mammalian lineages, and that later diversity of mammals was brought about by separate, fast-speciating mammalian lineages.
- Belyaev et al. (2024) compare the body plans of mammoths, extant elephants, odd-toed and even-toed ungulates and their Paleogene relatives, reporting evidence of homogeneous body plan of mammoths and elephants that is markedly different from other large herbivores, and evidence of differences between body plans of Paleogene proboscideans and odd-toed ungulates and their extant relatives.
- A study on the structure of American mammal communities throughout the Cenozoic is published by Shupinski et al. (2024), who report evidence of shifts in functional diversity associated with major ecological and environmental transitions, and evidence of immediate increase in functional diversity after the Cretaceous–Paleogene extinction event.
- A study on changes of communities of the Paleocene and Eocene mammals from the Bighorn Basin (Wyoming, United States) is published by Whittingham, Korasidis & Fraser (2024), who find evidence of a reduced role of habitat preferences in the assembly of the studied communities during and after the Paleocene–Eocene Thermal Maximum.
- Jones, Travouillon & Janis (2024) compare variation in the hindlimb proportions of extant jerboas and extinct argyrolagids, providing evidence of convergent elongation of metatarsal which might be caused by metatarsal fusion and loss in the studied groups and by greater reliance on bipedalism.
- Crespo & Goin (2024) argue that a biogeographical barrier (called the Weddell Line by the authors) existed between East and West Antarctica during early Paleogene times and prevented eutherian mammals from reaching Australia from South America.
- Bergqvist et al. (2024) interpret the assemblage of Paleogene mammals from the Itaboraí Basin (Brazil) as composed of faunas of different ages.
- Evidence of the impact of the rate of landscape changes on the mammalian diversity in the Basin and Range Province in western United States over the past 30 million years is presented by Smiley et al. (2024).
- Calede et al. (2024) report the discovery of the first Arikareean mammal fossils from the Kishnehn Formation (Montana, United States), representing the northernmost records of Paciculus montanus, Pronodens transmontanus and a member of the genus Miohippus from the Rocky Mountains reported to date.
- A study on the diet of mammalian herbivores from the Miocene Buluk site (Kenya), as indicated by stable carbon and oxygen isotope analyses of tooth enamel, is published by Arney et al. (2024), who find no evidence of a significant C_{4} component in diets of the studied herbivores, in spite of evidence for the presence of C_{4} vegetation at Buluk.
- A study on dietary habits of late Miocene ungulates and carnivorans from the Neogene savanna in the northern Black Sea region, as indicated by tooth wear in fossils from the sites of Grebeniki (Ukraine), Cioburciu 1 and Tudorovo (Moldova), is published by Rivals et al. (2024), who interpret their findings as indicative of diverse dietary adaptations of the studied ungulates, with rhinoceroses Aceratherium incisivum and Chilotherium schlosseri interpreted as grazers, and with hipparions interpreted as browsers or mixed-feeders.
- A study on predator–prey interactions in the Iberian Peninsula over the last 20 million years, providing evidence of the impact of the loss of medium-sized herbivores on patterns of extinction and persistence among predators, is published by Nascimento et al. (2024).
- A study on body mass, tooth wear and functional traits of teeth of mammalian herbivores from the Miocene to Pleistocene strata from the Falcón Basin (Venezuela), interpreted as indicative of a gradual decline in precipitation and tree cover in the environment of the studied mammals since the late Miocene, is published by Wilson et al. (2024).
- De La Fuente et al. (2024) identify small mammal tracks from the Neogene strata from the Vinchina Basin (Argentina) as produced by armadillos, hegetotheriid notoungulates and maras, and name new ichnotaxa Pichipoda manganae, Pichipoda vizcainoi and Tridactylonicha marsicanae.
- Evidence indicating that climate changes (particularly cooling) had impact on mammal dispersals during the Great American Interchange is presented by Freitas-Oliveira et al. (2024).
- Freitas-Oliveira, Lima-Ribeiro & Terribile (2024) argue that Thylacosmilus had a narrower climatic niche than Smilodon (and likely was more vulnerable to the climate change), and consider it unlikely that the extinction of Thylacosmilus was caused by competition with Smilodon.
- A study on the composition of the mammal faunas from the East African Rift System throughout the last 6 million years is published by Rowan et al. (2024), who report evidence of faunas largely composed of endemic species during the Late Miocene and Pliocene, and evidence of subsequent biotic homogenization likely related to regional expansion of grass-dominated ecosystems.
- Hanon et al. (2024) describe Plio-Pleistocene bovid material from the Kromdraai Unit P (South Africa), including fossil material of a previously unknown buffalo that could be closely related to Syncerus acoelotus and possible oldest fossils of members of the genera Damaliscus and Numidocapra (as well as Paranthropus robustus) in southern Africa, and interpret the studied bovids as indicative of a grassland-dominated environment; the authors also study other associations of bovid and hominin bones from Plio-Pleistocene South African sites, and find than members of the genus Australopithecus were associated with bovids adapted to woodlands and closed-wet environments and that members of the genus Homo were found with bovids adapted to open and dry environments, while members of the genus Paranthropus were found in association with bovids adapted to various environments.
- Sambo et al. (2024) study ecomorphology of bovids from the Kromdraai Unit P, interpret the studied bovids as living in a mosaic environment dominated by savanna grasslands, tall grasses and light bushes, with forests present to a lesser degree, and interpret their finding as indicative of presence of Paranthropus robustus in mosaic environmental settings.
- A study on the dietary guild structures of Pliocene herbivores from the Laetoli site (Tanzania) is published by Fillion & Harrison (2024), who argue that the replacement of Australopithecus afarensis by Paranthropus aethiopicus at the Laetoli site was related to an increase in grass cover within a woodland-grassland mosaic.
- Orihuela et al. (2024) describe fossil material of terrestrial mammals from the Pliocene-Pleistocene strata from the El Abra outcrop in Matanzas (Cuba), including fossil material of a hutia with possible affinities with the imposter hutia.
- Ramírez-Pedraza et al. (2024) report evidence from the Guefaït-4 fossil site (Morocco) indicative of the presence of a mosaic landscape with open grasslands, forested areas, wetlands and seasonal aridity close to the Pliocene-Pleistocene transition, which might have facilitated the dispersal of mammals (including hominins) from central or eastern Africa to northern Africa.
- A study on the structure of the Pleistocene large mammal assemblages from Eurasia, and on the factors that influenced their structure, is published by Bekeraitė, Juchnevičiūtė & Spiridonov (2024), who find that, in spite of environmental changes, the network of dependencies among mammalian clades present in the studied assemblages did not significantly change over time.
- A study on environments inhabited by early members of the genus Homo in Africa and Eurasia, as indicated by dental traits of mammals from these environments, is published by Foister et al. (2024), who interpret their findings as indicating that Early Pleistocene members of the genus Homo were able to occupy diverse environments, and that their expansion into Eurasia likely resulted in a niche expansion.
- A study on changes of ecospace occupancy of European carnivorans throughout the Pleistocene is published by Iannucci (2024), who finds that hominins entered Europe at the time when the continent lacked middle-sized carnivorans that were either highly social active hunters or primarily scavengers, and that hominins had the opportunity to fill a vacant ecospace at the time.
- Konidaris et al. (2024) review the late Early and Middle Pleistocene fossil record of mammals from the Megalopolis Basin (Greece), interpret the studied fossils as consistent with the refugial status of the basin for the studied mammals, and interpret the fossil record of hippopotamids from the Megalopolis Basin as likely indicative of body size decrease in response to changing climatic conditions.
- Zhang et al. (2024) report the discovery of fossil material of a new mammalian assemblage from the late Middle Pleistocene strata from the Upper Pubu Cave in the Bubing Basin (Guangxi, China), and interpret the composition of the studied assemblage as suggestive of environmental deterioration and reduction of the forested areas towards the end of the Middle Pleistocene.
- Fan et al. (2024) report the discovery of a new assemblage of mammals fossils from the late Middle Pleistocene strata from the Zhongshan Cave in the Bubing Basin (Guangxi, China), including diverse and abundant ruminants.
- A study on the fossil material of mammals from the Notarchirico site in southern Italy, providing evidence of subsequent appearances of three different mammal complexes in response of climatic-driven environmental changes, is published by Mecozzi et al. (2024).
- Espinasa-Pereña et al. (2024) report the discovery of a new assemblage of Pleistocene megafaunal fossils (including mammoths, gomphotheres, horses, deer, bovids, camelids, sloths, glyptodonts, felids, canids and lagomorphs) from the Calera cave system (San Luis Potosí, Mexico).
- Carrillo-Briceño et al. (2024) describe a new assemblage of mammal fossils from the Pleistocene site Cauca (Venezuela), including fossils of xenarthran megaherbivores, gomphotheres and equids, as well as fossil material of the ocelot or a related medium-sized feline, representing the first record of fossil material of cf. Leopardus pardalis in north-western Venezuela.
- A study on the carbon and oxygen isotope composition of remains of Eremotherium laurillardi, Notiomastodon platensis and Toxodon platensis from the Zabelê tank in the northeastern Brazil, providing evidence that the studied mammals lived in a transition zone between arboreal to open savanna and had a mixed-feeder diet with a higher consumption of C_{4} plants compared to mammals from other Late Pleistocene localities in the Brazilian Intertropical Region, is published by Andrade, Dantas & Oliveira (2024).
- Evidence from the cave site of Grotta Grande (Salerno, Campania, Italy), interpreted as indicating that during the Marine Isotope Stage 5 the abandonment of the Neanderthal camp at the site was likely immediately followed by scavenging of remains left by Neanderthals by the spotted hyena, is presented by Spagnolo et al. (2024).
- A study on the ecology of prey species that Neanderthals depended on during the Late Pleistocene, as indicated by strontium isotope data from teeth from the Pech de l'Azé IV and Roc de Marsal sites (France), is published by Hodgkins et al. (2024), who find that the ranges of reindeer and bisons were restricted to the Aquitaine and Paris basins, where they were available year-round to the Neanderthal hunters, while horses and red deer had broader ranges and may have ventured into the mountainous regions.
- A study on the strontium isotope composition of remains of bovids and equids from Kenya living during the Last Glacial Period is published by O'Brien et al. (2024), who find that only Rusingoryx atopocranion and Megalotragus sp. were migratory, while finding no definitive evidence for migration in other studied taxa, including those which are long-distance migrants in the present.
- A study on the age of the woolly mammoth, cave lion, reindeer and aurochs remains from the Kaliningrad Oblast (Russia), providing evidence of the presence of megafauna in the studied area prior to the Last Glacial Maximum, is published by Kuzmin, Martynovich & van der Plicht (2024).
- A study on human prey selection criteria and on their impact on Pleistocene megafauna extinctions is published by Ben-Dor & Barkai (2024), who argue that limited protein metabolism capacity in humans led them to hunt prey (especially large-bodied taxa and prime adults) that were fat-rich but were more sensitive to hunting pressure than smaller prey.
- Bampi et al. (2024) review known record of megafauna kill sites in South America, interpreted it as robust as or even more robust in quantity and quality than North American records, and argue that limited scientific impact of the studies of the South American megafauna kill sites is mainly caused by language bias.
- Bradshaw et al. (2024) present stochastic models of megafauna population dynamics that can be used to study human impact on extinctions of megafauna, apply this model to the fossil record from the Late Pleistocene from Cyprus, and argue that the estimated human population sizes after the human arrival on the island were sufficient to drive Palaeoloxodon cypriotes and the Cypriot pygmy hippopotamus to extinction within less than 1000 years.
- Evidence interpreted as indicative of a relationship between critical periods of seasonality and desertification and late Quaternary megafauna extinctions in continental regions and connected islands, as well as indicative of a relationship between critical periods of climate change and modern human arrival in continental regions, is presented by Graipel et al. (2024).
- Evidence from the study of the mammalian fossil record, indicating that the probability of expansion of the range of Cenozoic mammalian species did not depend on the size of the range that the species already occupied, is presented by Žliobaitė (2024).
