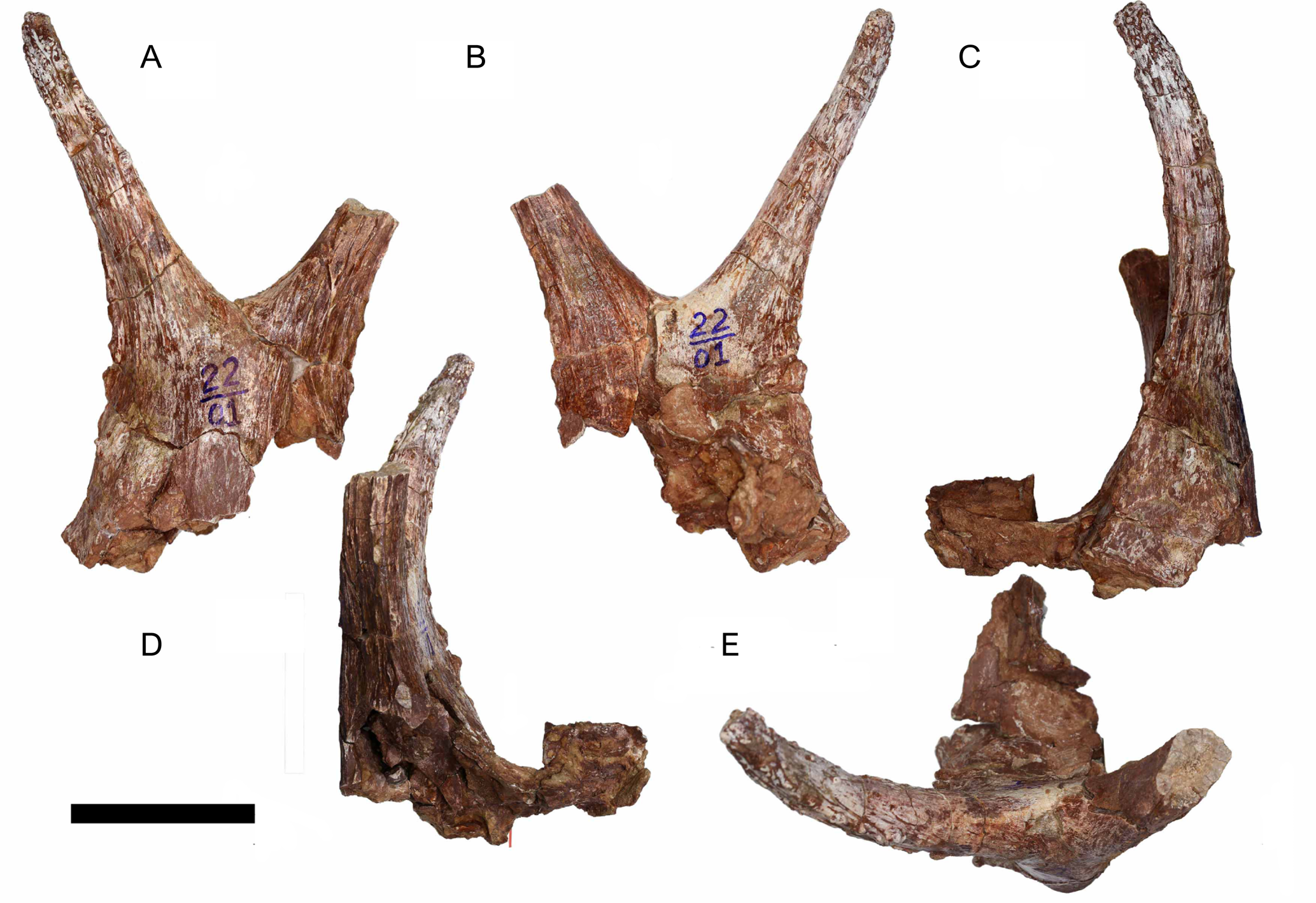
- Bramiscus holotype

Scientific classification
- Kingdom: Animalia
- Phylum: Chordata
- Class: Mammalia
- Order: Artiodactyla
- Family: Giraffidae
- Genus: †Bramiscus; Ríos et al., 2024
- Species: †B. micros

Binomial name
- †Bramiscus micros Ríos et al., 2024

= Bramiscus =

Bramiscus Temporal range: Middle–Late Miocene (Astaracian–Vallesian), 14–9.27 Ma

Genus of extinct giraffid mammals

Bramiscus is an extinct genus of giraffid artiodactyl ungulates from the Miocene Chinji and Dhok Pathan formations of Pakistan. The genus contains a single species, B. micros, known from several partial skeletons.

== Discovery and naming ==
Most of the Bramiscus fossil material was discovered in sediments of the Chinji Formation (Astaracian age), including frontals with ossicones ("horn-like" structures in giraffids), teeth, and a mandibular fragment. Among these is the holotype (PUPC 22/01), which consists of a frontal fragment with both fused ossicones, and the paratype (PUPC 13/375), which consists of a pair of ossicones. The proximal end of a right metatarsal (Y-GSP-14999) was also referred to Bramiscus, discovered in sediments of the Dhok Pathan Formation (Vallesian age). All of the known material was found in the Lower–Middle Siwaliks near Punjab, Pakistan.

In 2024, Ríos et al. described Bramiscus micros as a new genus and species of early giraffids based on these fossil remains. The generic name, Bramiscus, combines a reference to the morphologically similar but distantly related giraffid Bramatherium, with the Greek suffix "-iscus", meaning "very small". In turn, the name Bramatherium references Brahma, the Hindu creator god. The specific name, micros, is taken from the Ancient Greek μικρός (mikrós), meaning "small", in reference to the smaller size of Bramiscus compared to similar taxa.

== Classification ==
In their phylogenetic analyses, Ríos et al. (2024) recovered Bramiscus as one of the basalmost giraffids, in a polytomy with Georgiomeryx. Their results are displayed in the cladogram below:

- Giraffidae
  - Canthumeryx
  - - Bramiscus
    - Georgiomeryx
    - - - Injanatherium spp.
        - Giraffokeryx spp.
      - - younger giraffids
