= Talquinodus =

Talquinodus Temporal range: Eocene

Scientific classification
- Kingdom: Animalia
- Phylum: Chordata
- Class: Mammalia
- Mirorder: Euungulata
- Clade: Panperissodactyla
- Genus: †Talquinodus
- Species: †T. puertai

Binomial name
- †Talquinodus puertai Kramarz et al., 2024

Extinct genus of mammals

Talquinodus is an extinct genus of basal ungulate that inhabited South America during the Eocene epoch. It is a monotypic genus that contains the species T. puertai.
