= Hystrix aegeanensis =

Hystrix aegeanensis Temporal range: Miocene

Scientific classification
- Kingdom: Animalia
- Phylum: Chordata
- Class: Mammalia
- Infraclass: Placentalia
- Order: Rodentia
- Family: Hystricidae
- Genus: Hystrix
- Species: †H. aegeanensis

Binomial name
- †Hystrix aegeanensis Halaçlar et al., 2024

Extinct species of mammal

Hystrix aegeanensis is an extinct species of Hystrix that lived in Greece and Turkey during the Neogene period.
