= Shilinhyus =

Shilinhyus Temporal range: Middle Eocene

Scientific classification
- Kingdom: Animalia
- Phylum: Chordata
- Class: Mammalia
- Infraclass: Placentalia
- Order: Artiodactyla
- Superfamily: †Dichobunoidea
- Genus: †Shilinhyus
- Species: †S. chowi

Binomial name
- †Shilinhyus chowi Wang et al., 2024

Extinct genus of mammals

Shilinhyus is an extinct genus of dichobunoid artiodactyl that inhabited Yunnan during the Eocene epoch. It is a monotypic taxon that contains a single species, Shilinhyus chowi.
