= Fejfarictis =

Fejfarictis Temporal range: Early Oligocene

Scientific classification
- Kingdom: Animalia
- Phylum: Chordata
- Class: Mammalia
- Infraclass: Placentalia
- Order: Carnivora
- Infraorder: Aeluroidea
- Genus: †Fejfarictis
- Species: †F. valecensis

Binomial name
- †Fejfarictis valecensis De Bonis et al., 2024

Extinct genus of mammals

Fejfarictis is an extinct genus of aeluroid that lived in what is today the Czech Republic during the Oligocene epoch. A monotypic genus, it contains the species Fejfarictis valecensis.
