= Idicia =

Idicia Temporal range: Middle Eocene

Scientific classification
- Domain: Eukaryota
- Kingdom: Animalia
- Phylum: Chordata
- Class: Mammalia
- Order: Rodentia
- Family: †Theridomyidae
- Genus: †Idicia; Vianey-Liaud et al., 2024
- Species: †I. vidalenci

Binomial name
- †Idicia vidalenci Vianey-Liaud et al., 2024

Extinct genus of rodents

Idicia is an extinct genus of Palaeogene rodents belonging to the family Theridomyidae. The genus and its sole species Idicia vidalenci were both named by Monique Vianey-Liaud et al. in 2024 based on some holotype dentition from the French locality of Lavergne, dating to the middle Eocene. It was named in honor of Dominique Vidalenc, who discovered the holotype material. It is diagnosed as being a medium-sized and brachyodont (low-crowned) theridomyid with various specific morphologies of its cuspids. A wide range of other faunas were recovered form Lavergne along with Idicia such as the herpetotheriid Peratherium, nyctithere Saturninia, omomyid Necrolemur, carnivoraforme Quercygale, tapirulid Tapirulus, and the palaeothere Palaeotherium.
