= Burgia =

Burgia Temporal range: Middle Eocene

Scientific classification
- Kingdom: Animalia
- Phylum: Chordata
- Class: Mammalia
- Infraclass: Placentalia
- Order: Rodentia
- Family: †Theridomyidae
- Genus: †Burgia; Vianey-Liaud et al., 2024
- Species: †B. marandati

Binomial name
- †Burgia marandati (Vianey-Liaud, 1991)

Extinct genus of rodents

Burgia is an extinct genus of Palaeogene rodents belonging to the family Theridomyidae. It is more specifically classified to the subfamily Patriotheridomyinae and contains one species Burgia marandati. The type and only species was originally classified to another genus name Bernardia by Monique Vianey-Liaud in 1991 before the genus name usage was rendered invalid due to it being preoccupied by a scale insect in 1891. Burgia marandati is known from a holotype consisting of a lower molar from the French locality of Lavergne that dates to the middle Eocene. The genus is named after the Bach mayor Pierre Burg, who assisted palaeontologists in their research locally.
