= Aliusuellus =

Aliusuellus Temporal range: Middle Eocene

Scientific classification
- Kingdom: Animalia
- Phylum: Chordata
- Class: Mammalia
- Order: Artiodactyla
- Family: †Tapirulidae
- Genus: †Aliusuellus
- Species: †A. laolii

Binomial name
- †Aliusuellus laolii Bai et al., 2023

Extinct genus of tapirulid artiodactyl

Aliusuellus is an extinct monotypic genus of tapirulid ungulate that lived in China during the Irdinmanhan Asian land mammal age of the Eocene epoch.

== Etymology ==
The generic name Aliusuellus is named after the Ali Usu site where the holotype specimen was discovered. The specific epithet of the type and only species, Aliusuellus laolii, means 'elder Li', in reference to Qiang Li, the discoverer of the holotype.
