= Pusillutragus =

Pusillutragus Temporal range: Early Miocene

Scientific classification
- Kingdom: Animalia
- Phylum: Chordata
- Class: Mammalia
- Order: Artiodactyla
- Family: Bovidae
- Genus: †Pusillutragus
- Species: †P. montrealensis

Binomial name
- †Pusillutragus montrealensis Mennecart et al., 2024

Extinct genus of mammals

Pusillutragus is an extinct genus of bovid that inhabited France during the Early Miocene. It contains a single species, Pusillutragus montrealensis.
