= Ctenomys avitus =

Ctenomys avitus Temporal range: Middle Pleistocene

Scientific classification
- Kingdom: Animalia
- Phylum: Chordata
- Class: Mammalia
- Order: Rodentia
- Family: Ctenomyidae
- Genus: Ctenomys
- Species: †C. avitus

Binomial name
- †Ctenomys avitus De Santi et al., 2024

Extinct species of rodent

Ctenomys avitus is an extinct species of subterranean caviomorph rodent in the family Ctenomyidae and genus Ctenomys (commonly known as tuco-tucos). It lived during the Middle Pleistocene (approximately 400,000 years ago) in present-day central Argentina. Ctenomys avitus is notable for being represented by the most complete skeleton known for any extinct tuco-tuco species, allowing for the first virtual endocranial reconstruction (digital brain endocast) and middle ear ossicle analysis of a fossil Ctenomys.

Etymology: the specific epithet avitus is Latin for "ancestral", referring to its primitive morphological features and its basal phylogenetic position relative to the crown group of the genus.

== Discovery and fossil record ==
Fossil remains of C. avitus were recovered from Middle Pleistocene sediment deposits in coastal cliffs near Necochea, Buenos Aires Province, Argentina.

- Holotype (MLP-Pv 91-IV-25–212): Discovered inside a paleocave in Unit B at the Costa Bonita locality (associated with the Ctenomys kraglievichi Biozone, correlated with Marine Isotope Stage 11, ca. 0.4 Ma). It consists of a subadult individual preserving an almost complete skull and mandible, along with approximately 45% of the postcranial skeleton (including cervical, thoracic, lumbar, and caudal vertebrae, ribs, pelvic girdle, forelimbs, hindlimbs, hands, and feet).
- Referred material: Additional cranial fragments (MLP-Pv 91-IV-25–58 and MLP-Pv 91-IV-25–126) recovered from level LG4 at the nearby Las Grutas site.

== Phylogeny and evolution ==
Phylogenetic analyses combining morphological traits and molecular sequences place Ctenomys avitus within the stem group of Ctenomys.

Within the stem group, C. avitus is recovered as the immediate sister species to the crown group Ctenomys, which encompasses all living species and several extinct Pleistocene lineages. Bayesian tip-dating analyses estimate that the lineage leading to C. avitus and the crown group diverged approximately 2.2 to 2.5 million years ago (Early Pleistocene). Its skeletal anatomy preserves a combination of plesiomorphic (primitive) features shared with early Plio-Pleistocene stem species (e.g., C. chapalmalensis and C. rusconii) and derived characters that foreshadow the modern radiation of tuco-tucos
