= Solatherium =

Solatherium Temporal range: Campanian

Scientific classification
- Kingdom: Animalia
- Phylum: Chordata
- Class: Mammalia
- Clade: Marsupialiformes
- Family: †Pediomyidae
- Genus: †Solatherium
- Species: †S. nenjiangensis

Binomial name
- †Solatherium nenjiangensis Gao et al., 2024

Extinct genus of marsupials

Solatherium is an extinct genus of marsupialiform that inhabited China during the Campanian. It contains a single species, S. nenjiangensis.
