= Zeballothentes =

Zeballothentes Temporal range: Middle Miocene

Scientific classification
- Kingdom: Animalia
- Phylum: Chordata
- Class: Mammalia
- Infraclass: Marsupialia
- Order: Paucituberculata
- Genus: †Zeballothentes
- Species: †Z. incertus

Binomial name
- †Zeballothentes incertus Martin et al., 2024

Extinct genus of metatherian

Zeballothentes is an extinct genus of metatherian that lived in Argentina during the Middle Miocene. It is a monotypic genus containing the species Z. incertus.
