= Aureia =

Aureia Temporal range: Late Oligocene

Scientific classification
- Kingdom: Animalia
- Phylum: Chordata
- Class: Mammalia
- Infraclass: Placentalia
- Order: Artiodactyla
- Infraorder: Cetacea
- Genus: †Aureia
- Species: †A. rerehua

Binomial name
- †Aureia rerehua Meekin et al., 2024

Extinct genus of mammals

Aureia is an extinct genus of platanistoid that lived during the Chattian stage of the Oligocene epoch.

== Distribution ==
Aureia rerehua is known from the Otekaike Limestone Formation in New Zealand.
