= Thylacopygmaeus =

Thylacopygmaeus Temporal range: Early Eocene

Scientific classification
- Kingdom: Animalia
- Phylum: Chordata
- Class: Mammalia
- Family: †Herpetotheriidae
- Genus: †Thylacopygmaeus
- Species: †T. oliveirai

Binomial name
- †Thylacopygmaeus oliveirai Carneiro et al., 2024

Extinct genus of mammals

Thylacopygmaeus is an extinct genus of herpetotheriid that lived in Brazil during the Early Eocene. It contains a single species, Thylacopygmaeus oliveirai.
