= Xenocynus =

Xenocynus Temporal range: Early Eocene

Scientific classification
- Kingdom: Animalia
- Phylum: Chordata
- Class: Mammalia
- Clade: Metatheria
- Genus: †Xenocynus
- Species: †X. crypticus

Binomial name
- †Xenocynus crypticus Carneiro et al., 2024

Extinct genus of mammals

Xenocynus is an extinct genus of metatherian mammal that lived in Brazil during the Eocene. It is a monotypic genus that contains a single species, Xenocynus crypticus.

== Palaeobiology ==
=== Biomechanics ===
X. crypticus possessed a weak bite, but one that was fast.

=== Palaeoecology ===
X. crypticus was insectivorous and carnivorous.
