= Laili (cave) =

Cave and archaeological site in East Timor

- Location in East Timor
- 8.5409°S 126.1632°E
- Type: Limestone cave
- Location: near Laleia, Manatuto District
- Region: East Timor

Site notes
- Elevation: 86 m (282 ft)

Laili is a limestone cave located near the town of Laleia, Manatuto District, East Timor. Archeological findings in Laili provide evidence that the cave was occupied by modern humans 44,600 years ago, making it the second oldest known such habitation in Wallacea aside from Madjedbebe in mainland Northern Australia.

The age of findings made in Laili corroborates the theory that humans spread from Asia to Australia through the Southern route, via Java and the Lesser Sunda Islands.

== Location ==
Today, the cave lies at an altitude of 86 metres (282 ft). 44,600 years ago, during initial settlement, the sea level was 63 metres (207 ft) lower than today. During the Last Glacial Maximum, about 20,000 years ago, the sea level was 130 metres (430 ft) lower than today. The steepness of the shore near Laili means that the distance from the cave to the shore has stayed relatively unchanged over time, from 5 kilometres (3.1 mi) during the peak of the glacial era to 4.3 kilometres (2.7 mi) today.

== Occupation ==
Findings from the cave provide evidence for occupation spanning 44,600 to 11,200 years before present. Usage of the cave increased towards the end of the Last Glacial Maximum 15,000 years ago, suggesting a dramatic increase of the population as sea levels rose.

== Findings ==
=== Animal remains ===
The remains of fruit bats, rodents, birds, fishes and turtles were found in Laili. Not all can be attributed to human hunting. For example, presence of murids (small rodents) was relatively constant during the occupation of the cave, suggesting that humans had little impact on murids.

As there is no evidence of fishing by owls present in Timor at the time, fish remains (parrotfish and freshwater eel) can be attributed to human consumption. However, unlike in Jerimalai, it is thought that these fishes were caught using traps or spears, and not with fishing hooks.

While abundant bird remains were found in Laili, it is thought that most were deposited by avian predators. However, larger birds like ducks and imperial pigeons were probably hunted by humans.

Despite being close to the sea, few faunal remains found in Laili come from the sea. In that regard, Laili is similar to inland caves like Uai Bobo and Matja Kuru.

Birds and fruit bats suggest that the local environment was covered by forests during the Ice Age.

=== Tools ===
A high number of stone artefacts were excavated at Laili, suggesting that tools used by occupants of the cave were primarily made from the reduction of stones. This contrasts with the Jerimalai cave, where tools and jewelry made from seashells were found.

== Migration to the Australian continent ==
The Laili cave findings show that Timor was colonised at least 44,600 years ago. However, the oldest findings in Northern Australia date back more than 50,000 years. It is possible that some findings in Laili are older, but their age could not be determined using radiocarbon dating. Luminescence dating, which was used to date the earliest sites in Northern Australia, could produce earlier results.
