= Dama pontica =

Dama pontica Temporal range: Early Pleistocene

Scientific classification
- Kingdom: Animalia
- Phylum: Chordata
- Class: Mammalia
- Infraclass: Placentalia
- Order: Artiodactyla
- Family: Cervidae
- Genus: Dama
- Species: †D. pontica

Binomial name
- †Dama pontica Vislobokova, 2024

Extinct species of deer

Dama pontica is an extinct species of fallow deer that inhabited the Crimean Peninsula during the Early Pleistocene.
