= Anourosorex andabata =

Anourosorex andabata Temporal range: Pleistocene

Scientific classification
- Kingdom: Animalia
- Phylum: Chordata
- Class: Mammalia
- Order: Eulipotyphla
- Family: Soricidae
- Genus: Anourosorex
- Species: †A. andabata

Binomial name
- †Anourosorex andabata Lopatin, 2024

Extinct species of mammal

Anourosorex andabata is an extinct species of Anourosorex that inhabited Vietnam during the Pleistocene epoch.
