= Irdinodon =

Irdinodon Temporal range: Eocene

Scientific classification
- Kingdom: Animalia
- Phylum: Chordata
- Class: Mammalia
- Order: Artiodactyla
- Family: †Dichobunidae
- Genus: †Irdinodon
- Species: †I. bicuspidata

Binomial name
- †Irdinodon bicuspidata Bai et al., 2024

Extinct genus of mammals

Irdinodon is an extinct genus of the artiodactyl subfamily lantianiine that lived in China in the Eocene epoch. It contains a single species, Irdinodon bicuspidata.
