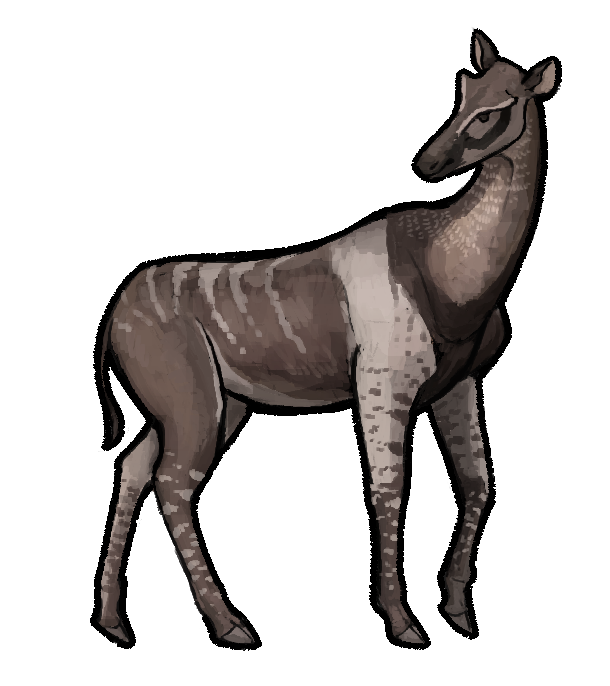
- Restoration of Georgiomeryx georgalasi

Scientific classification
- Kingdom: Animalia
- Phylum: Chordata
- Class: Mammalia
- Order: Artiodactyla
- Family: Giraffidae
- Genus: †Georgiomeryx; Paraskevaidis, 1940
- Species: †G. georgalasi

Binomial name
- †Georgiomeryx georgalasi Paraskevaidis, 1940

= Georgiomeryx =

Extinct genus of mammal

Georgiomeryx is an extinct genus of mammal in the giraffid clade that lived during the late Miocene epoch in the areas of Greece and Spain about 15.97 million to 11.608 million years ago. The only species in this genus is Georgiomeryx georgalasi.
