= Bondesiomys =

Bondesiomys Temporal range: Late Miocene

Scientific classification
- Kingdom: Animalia
- Phylum: Chordata
- Class: Mammalia
- Order: Rodentia
- Family: Dinomyidae
- Genus: †Bondesiomys; Rasia et al., 2024
- Species: †B. chasiquensis

Binomial name
- †Bondesiomys chasiquensis Rasia et al., 2024

Extinct genus of rodent

Bondesiomys is an extinct genus of dinomyid rodent that inhabited Argentina during the Late Miocene. It is a monotypic genus containing the species B. chasiquensis.
