= Shansictis =

Shansictis Temporal range: Late Miocene

Scientific classification
- Kingdom: Animalia
- Phylum: Chordata
- Class: Mammalia
- Infraclass: Placentalia
- Order: Carnivora
- Family: Mustelidae
- Genus: †Shansictis
- Species: †S. xinzhouensis

Binomial name
- †Shansictis xinzhouensis Jiangzuo et al., 2024

Extinct genus of mammals

Shansictis is an extinct genus of mustelid that inhabited China during the Late Miocene. It is a monotypic genus containing the species S. xinzhouensis.
