= Lepus berbericus =

Lepus berbericus Temporal range: Pleistocene

Scientific classification
- Kingdom: Animalia
- Phylum: Chordata
- Class: Mammalia
- Infraclass: Placentalia
- Order: Lagomorpha
- Family: Leporidae
- Genus: Lepus
- Species: †L. berbericus

Binomial name
- †Lepus berbericus Sen et al., 2024

Extinct species

Lepus berbericus is an extinct species of Lepus that lived during the Pleistocene.

== Distribution ==
Lepus berbericus is found in Morocco.
