= Solenodon ottenwalderi =

Solenodon ottenwalderi Temporal range: Quaternary

Scientific classification
- Kingdom: Animalia
- Phylum: Chordata
- Class: Mammalia
- Infraclass: Placentalia
- Order: Eulipotyphla
- Family: Solenodontidae
- Genus: Solenodon
- Species: †S. ottenwalderi

Binomial name
- †Solenodon ottenwalderi Viñola-López et al., 2024

Extinct species of mammal

Solenodon ottenwalderi is an extinct species of Solenodon that inhabited Haiti during the Quaternary period.

== Distribution ==
Solenodon ottenwalderi was endemic to western Hispaniola.
