= Orea leptia =

Orea leptia Temporal range: Middle Miocene, 13.6–11.4 Ma
- Skeletal reconstruction including the holotype (white) and referred (yellow) specimens

Scientific classification
- Kingdom: Animalia
- Phylum: Chordata
- Class: Mammalia
- Order: Artiodactyla
- Family: Giraffidae
- Subfamily: Giraffinae
- Genus: †Orea; Solounias & Ríos, 2025
- Species: †O. leptia

Binomial name
- †Orea leptia Solounias & Ríos, 2025

Species of extinct mammals

Orea leptia is an extinct species of giraffid artiodactyl ungulates known from the Miocene Chinji Formation of Pakistan. O. leptia is the only species in the genus Orea. It is closely related to the modern giraffe in the subfamily Giraffinae and is the oldest definitive member of this group. Several postcranial remains have been attributed to this species, including a first cervical vertebra and numerous limb bones. The Orea limb bones are notable for being very long and thin, with the metapodial bones being the most gracile known of any ruminant.

== Discovery and naming ==
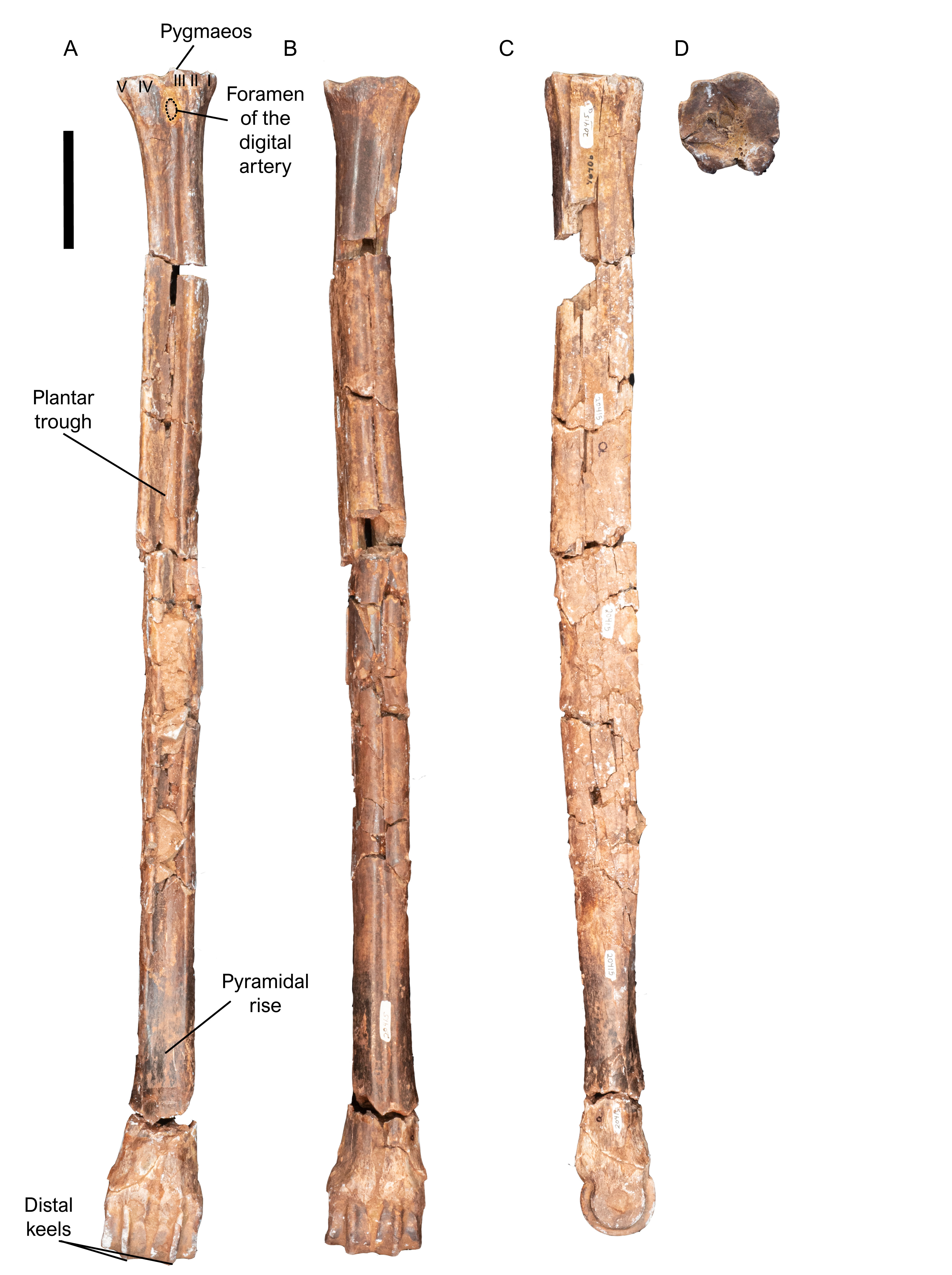
Holotype metatarsal of Orea

The Orea fossil material was collected in the 1980s by a joint expedition involving Harvard University (United States) and the Geological Survey of Pakistan. The bones were discovered in outcrops of the Chinji Formation on the Potwar Plateau of Pakistan, and are now accessioned at the Peabody Museum in Massachusetts, United States. The holotype specimen, Y GSP 20415, consists of a partial skeleton, comprising an articulated left hindlimb (the tibia, third and fourth metatarsal, and several ankle bones: the ectocuneiform, malleolar, calcaneus, and navicular-cuboid), a humerus, cuneiform, phalanx, and unciform. Several additional bones from different localities were also referred to this genus as cf. Orea sp. This uncertainty is due to a partial lack of overlapping material. Nevertheless, the referral was based on anatomical similarities to the morphology of the holotype. These bones include an atlas (the first cervical vertebrae, radius, several patial metacarpals, a right tibia, left metatarsal fragment, and a left and right astragalus.

In a synthesis of giraffid research published in the 2007 edited volume The Evolution of Artiodactyls, ungulate researcher Nikos Solounias preliminarily assigned specimen Y GSP 20415 to cf. Injanatherium.

In 2025, Solounias and Maria Ríos described Orea leptia as a new genus and species of giraffid mammals based on these fossil remains. The generic name, Orea, Greek word meaning "beautiful". The specific name, leptia, derived from the Greek word leptos, meaning "thin", in reference to the notable slenderness of the fossil material.

== Classification ==
In their 2025 description of Orea, Solounias and Ríos included this taxon in a phylogenetic analysis focused on both extinct and extant (living) members of the Giraffidae. Their results placed Orea as the sister taxon to Bohlinia attica within the subfamily Giraffinae in a clade also containing the modern giraffe genus Giraffa. These results are displayed in the cladogram below:

- Giraffidae
  - †Canthumeryx sirtensis
  - - †Georgiomeryx georgalasi
    - - - †Injanatherium spp.
        - †Giraffokeryx spp.
      - - Giraffinae
          - - †Bohlinia attica
            - †Orea leptia
          - - †Giraffa stillei
            - - †Giraffa jumae
              - Giraffa camelopardalis
        - - †Palaeotragus spp.
          - - Okapia johnstoni
            - - †Samotherium sinense
              - - †Schansitherium tafeli
                - - †Decennatherium spp.
                  - - - †Samotherium major
                      - †Samotherium boissieri
                      - †Alcicephalus neumayri
                    - - †Birgerbohlinia
                      - - †Sivatherium hendeyi
                        - - †Helladotherium duvernoyi
                          - - †Sivatherium spp.
                            - †Bramatherium spp.
