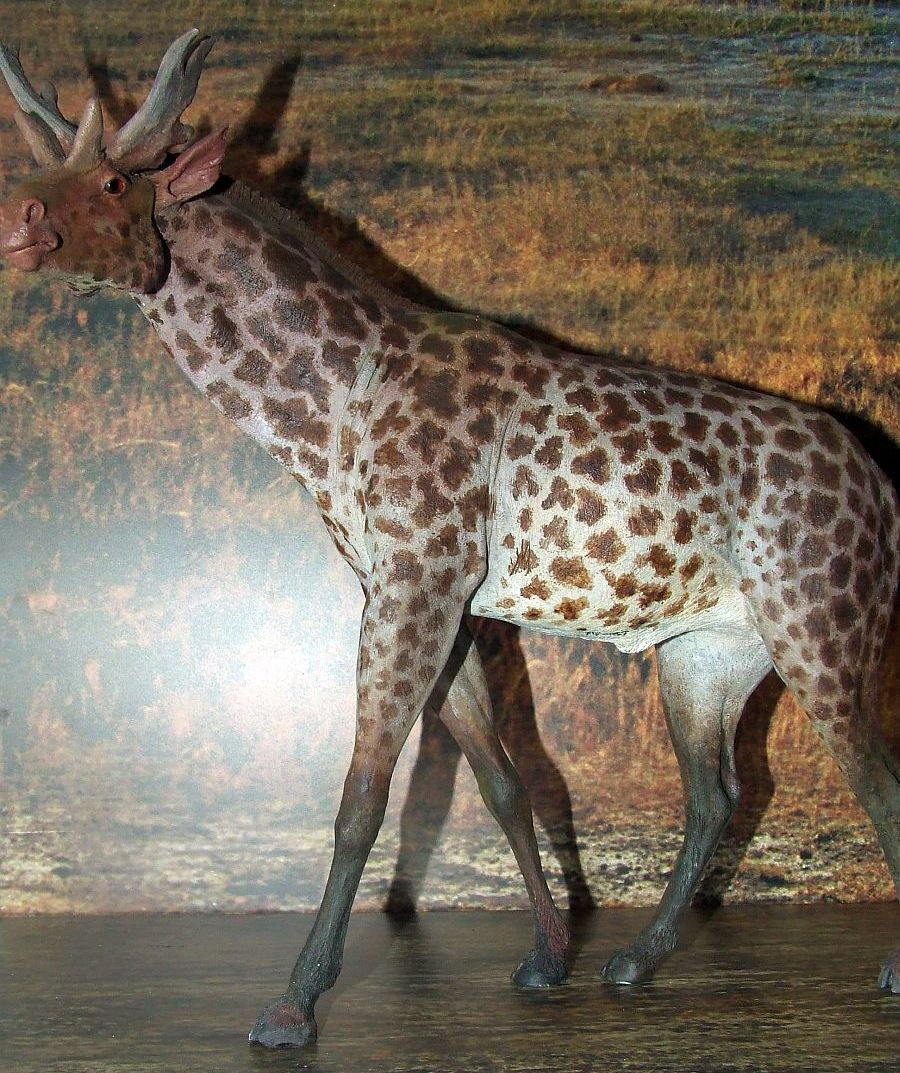
- Sivatherium reconstruction

Scientific classification
- Kingdom: Animalia
- Phylum: Chordata
- Class: Mammalia
- Order: Artiodactyla
- Family: Giraffidae
- Subfamily: †Sivatheriinae; Zittel, 1893

Genera
- Birgerbohlinia; Bramatherium; Decennatherium; Griquatherium; Helladotherium; Indratherium; Libytherium; Lyrakeryx?; Orangiatherium; Sivatherium; Vishnutherium

= Sivatheriinae =

Subfamily of prehistoric giraffids

Sivatheriinae is an extinct subfamily of giraffids characterized by their robust size, short limbs, and the presence of large complicated ossicones in males. These animals lived in Asia, Africa, and parts of Europe from the late Miocene and early Pleistocene.
