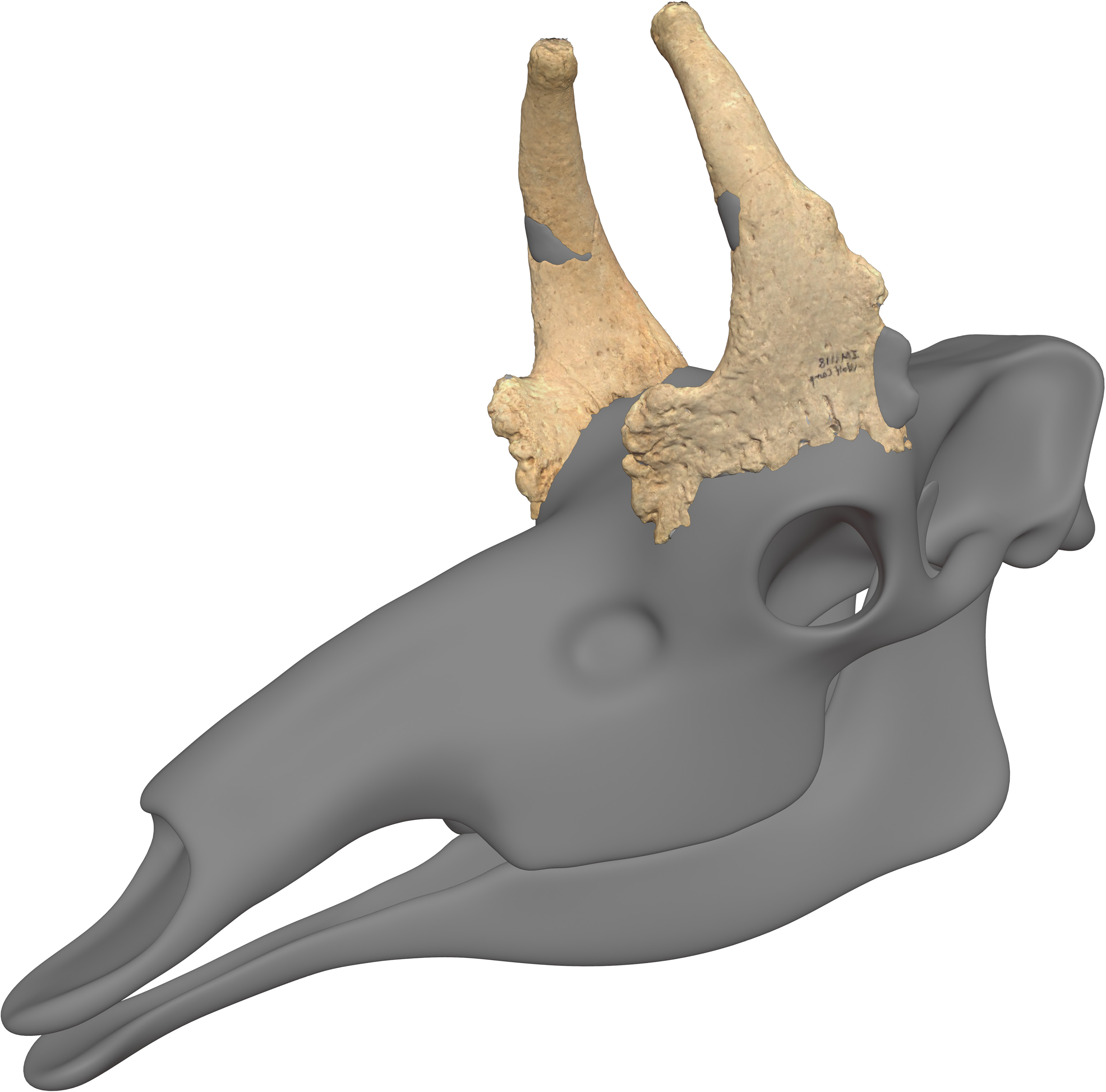
- 3D model of a giraffine skull (grey) including ossicones referred to Qilin

Scientific classification
- Kingdom: Animalia
- Phylum: Chordata
- Class: Mammalia
- Order: Artiodactyla
- Family: Giraffidae
- Subfamily: Giraffinae
- Tribe: †Bohlinini
- Genus: †Qilin; Wang et al., 2025
- Species: †Q. tungurensis

Binomial name
- †Qilin tungurensis (Colbert, 1936)

= Qilin tungurensis =

Qilin tungurensis Temporal range: Middle Miocene, ~11.7–12.8 Ma

Species of extinct mammals

Qilin tungurensis is an extinct species of giraffid artiodactyl ungulates known from the Miocene Tunggur Formation of Inner Mongolia, China. Q. tungurensis, originally assigned to the genus Palaeotragus, is the only species in the genus Qilin. It is closely related to the modern giraffe and extinct Bohlinia in the subfamily Giraffinae. It is known from several skull bones including an ossicone ("horn-like" structures in giraffids).

== Discovery and naming ==
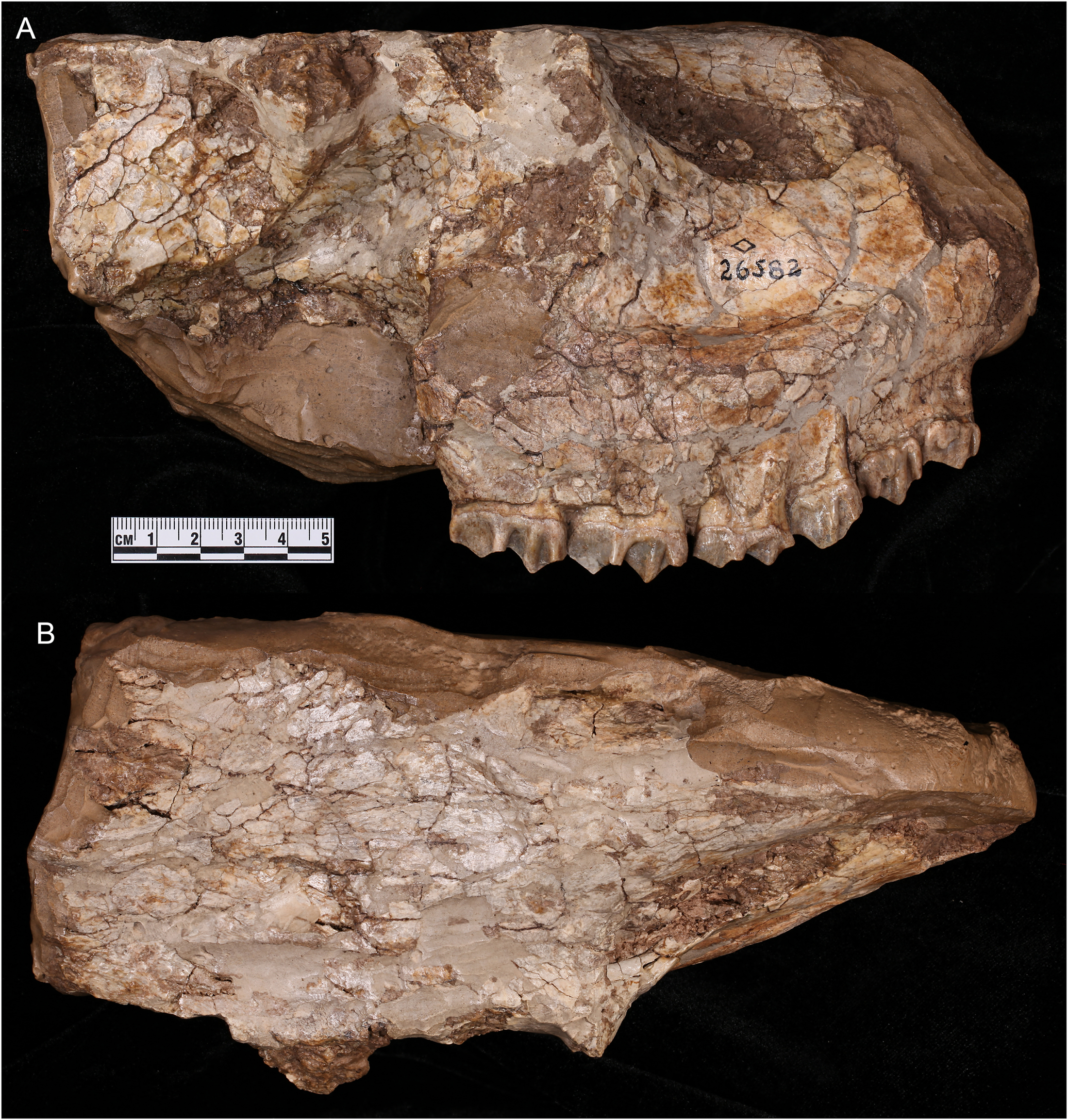
Holotype specimen, a partial skull

In 1930 the American Museum of Natural History conducted an excavation during their "Third Asiatic Expeditions" to outcrops of the Tunggur Formation in Inner Mongolia, China. At this time, workers collected several fragmentary giraffid cranial and mandibular bones with associated teeth in the 'Wolf Camp' locality. In 1936, American paleontologist Edwin H. Colbert described these remains as belonging to a new species in the giraffid genus Palaeotragus, which he named Palaeotragus tungurensis, the specific name he chose referencing the discovery of the remains in the Tunggur Formation. The holotype specimen, AMNH 26582, comprises a partial skull with teeth. While the specimen is incomplete, enough remains to determine the absence of ossicones, suggesting it came from a female individual; this species, like modern giraffes, was sexually dimorphic, with males having large ossicones. In his description, Colbert deliberated on assigning the remains to a distinct genus, but decided that they were more similar to Palaeotragus—and in some ways specifically P. expectans—than any other taxon.

In 1978, W. R. Hamilton postulated that P. primaevus, another Palaeotragus species named in 1970, might actually be synonymous with P. tungurensis, and that this species was more closely related to the modern giraffe within Giraffinae than to Palaeotragus. This approach was followed by ungulate researcher Nikos Solounias in a synthesis of giraffid research published in the 2007 edited volume The Evolution of Artiodactyls, who stated that "P." tungurensis required a new generic name.

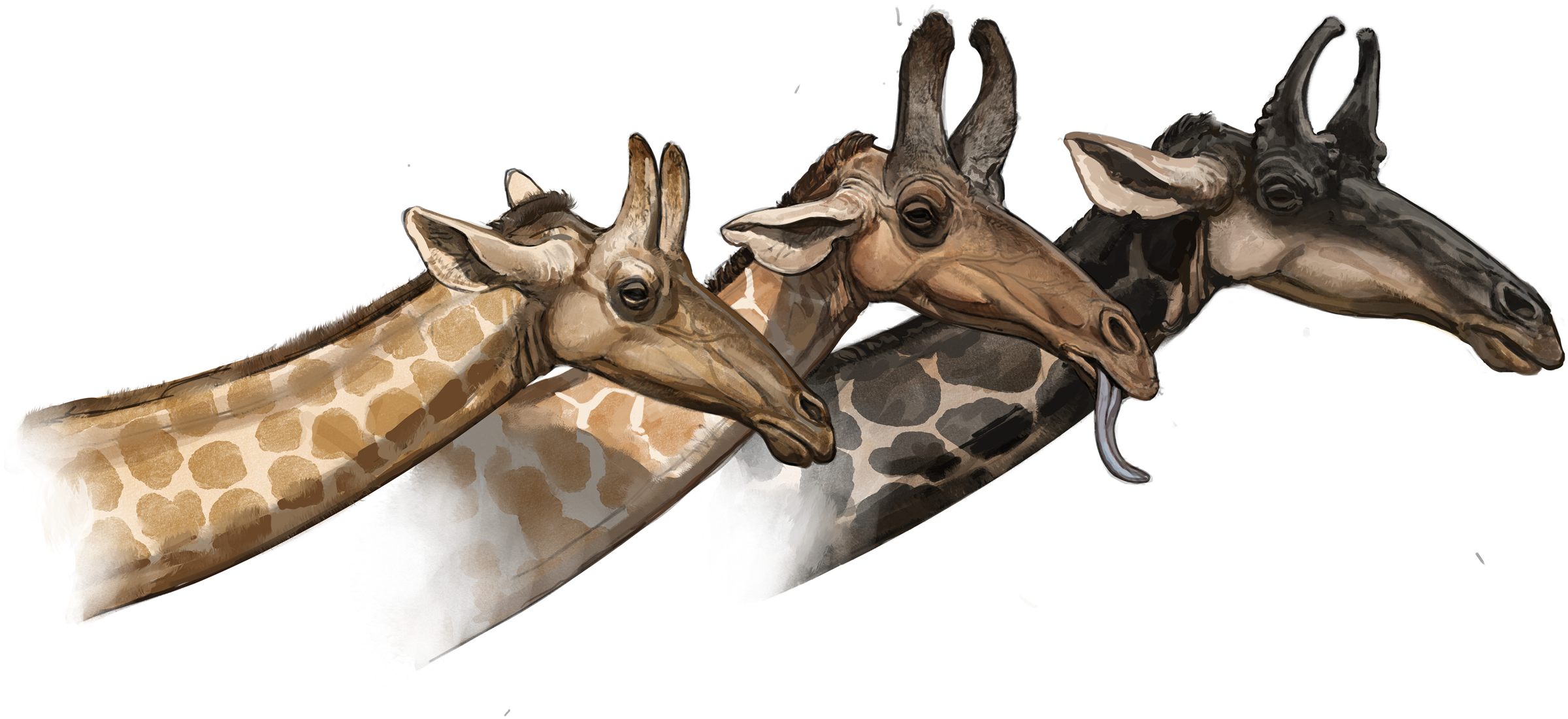
Speculative life restoration of three male Qilin individuals; the rightmost individual is the most mature

In August 2011, fieldwork was once again conducted at the Wolf Camp locality, where Yukimitsu Tomida discovered a well-preserved ossicone. Since it was referable to "P." tungurensis but demonstrated unique anatomy compared to every other giraffid, the erection of a new genus was deemed appropriate. In 2025, Xiaoming Wang and colleagues described Qilin as a new genus for "P." tungurensis based on Colbert's original cranial material, a partial metacarpal and metatarsal presumably collected at that time by the AMNH, and the new ossicone. The new generic name, Qilin, references a creature of the same name in Chinese myths (麒麟 in Pinyin), which, according to ancient texts, has hooved limbs and either one or two antlers. When two giraffes were brought to Beijing from Africa in 1414, the name 'qilin' became associated with these animals, and 麒麟 is still used to refer to giraffes in some Asian writing systems.

== Classification ==
Using anatomical characters, Wang and colleagues (2025) created a cladogram to represent the phylogenetic relationships between members of the giraffid subfamily Giraffinae. They recognized the close affinities between the modern giraffe (Giraffa, tribe Giraffini) and some extinct taxa previously regarded as belonging to a separate subfamily, called the Bohlininae. As such, the researchers used the new name Bohlinini to refer to the placement of this tribe within giraffines. Their results, displayed in the cladogram below, placed Qilin as the sister taxon to the younger (more recent) Bohlinia, with the genus Honanotherium also part of this clade.

- Giraffinae
  - Giraffini
    †Giraffa punjabiensis
    †Giraffa sivalensis
    †Giraffa stillei
    †Giraffa pygmaea
    †Giraffa jumae
    Giraffa camelopardalis
  - †Bohlinini
    - - Bohlinia attica (+ B. nikitiae)
      - - Qilin sp. (Siwaliks specimen)
        - Qilin tungurensis
    - - Honanotherium (Siwaliks) sp.
      - - Honanotherium bernori
        - Honanotherium schlosseri
