= Macedonitherium =

Scientific classification
- Kingdom: Animalia
- Phylum: Chordata
- Class: Mammalia
- Order: Artiodactyla
- Family: Giraffidae
- Genus: †Macedonitherium

Extinct genus of mammals

Macedonitherium is an extinct genus of giraffids. It was first named by Sickenberg in 1967.
