= Mitilanotherium =

Mitilanotherium Temporal range: Pliocene to Pleistocene
- An outline of Mitilanotherium

Scientific classification
- Kingdom: Animalia
- Phylum: Chordata
- Class: Mammalia
- Order: Artiodactyla
- Family: Giraffidae
- Genus: †Mitilanotherium

Species
- M. inexpectatum

Extinct genus of mammals

Mitilanotherium is an extinct genus of giraffes from the Pliocene and Pleistocene of Europe.

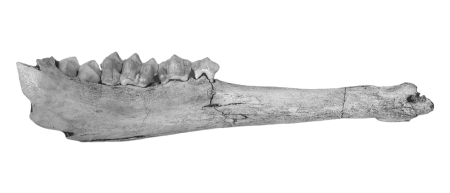
The mandible (the lower jaw bone) of Mililanotherium sp.

It was a medium-sized giraffid, resembling the modern okapi, with two long ossicones directly above its eyes, and relatively long and slender limbs. Fossils have been found in Greece, Romania, Ukraine, and Spain.

== Taxonomy ==
Some studies have suggested that Mitilanotherium is a junior synonym of Palaeotragus.
