= Csakvarotherium =

Scientific classification
- Kingdom: Animalia
- Phylum: Chordata
- Class: Mammalia
- Order: Artiodactyla
- Family: Giraffidae
- Genus: †Csakvarotherium; Kretzoi, 1930
- Species: †C. hungaricum

Binomial name
- †Csakvarotherium hungaricum Kretzoi, 1930

Extinct genus of mammals

Csakvarotherium is an extinct genus of mammals in the Giraffidae family from the Upper Miocene. The genus is known from a single species, Csakvarotherium hungaricum. The genus is named after Csákvár, a town in Hungary.
