= Csákvár =

- Town
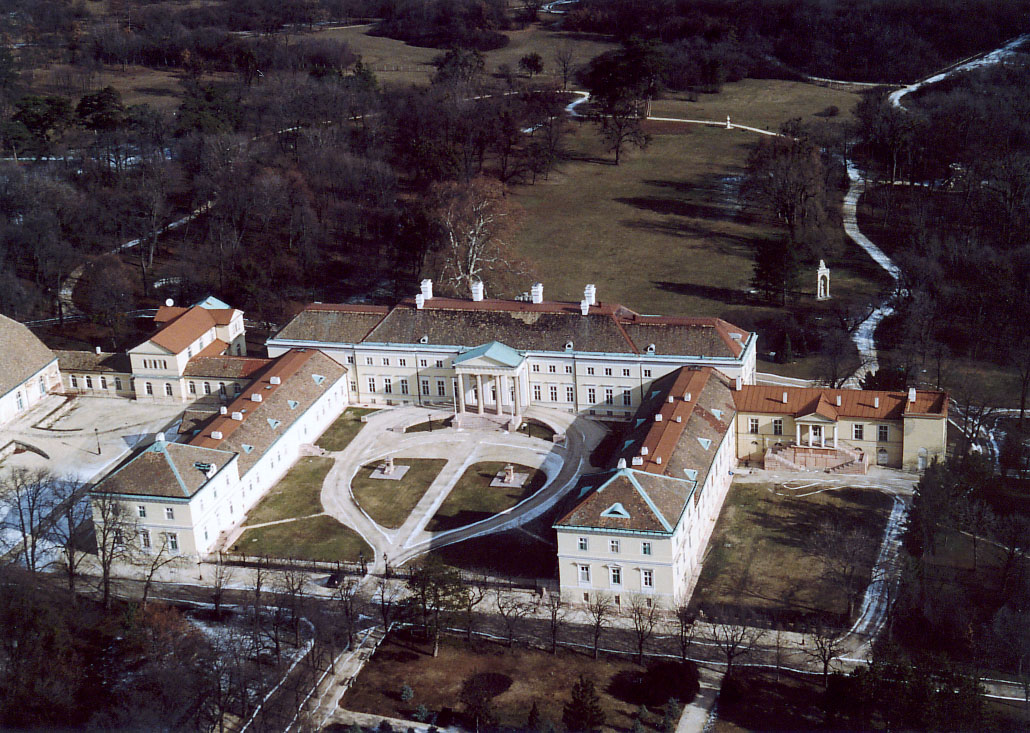
- Esterházy Mansion

- Flag Coat of arms

- Location of Csákvár
- Coordinates: 47.39332°N 18.46049°E
- Country: Hungary
- County: Fejér
- District: Bicske

Area
  - Total: 118.76 km^{2} (45.85 sq mi)

Population (2015)
  - Total: 5,225
  - Density: 44.00/km^{2} (113.9/sq mi)
- Time zone: UTC+1 (CET)
  - Summer (DST): UTC+2 (CEST)
- Postal code: 8083
- Area code: (+36) 22
- Website: www.csakvar.hu

Csákvár is a town in Fejér county, Hungary. Fossils have been found nearby. The fossil mammal Csakvarotherium is named after Csákvár.

== See also ==
- Csák family
