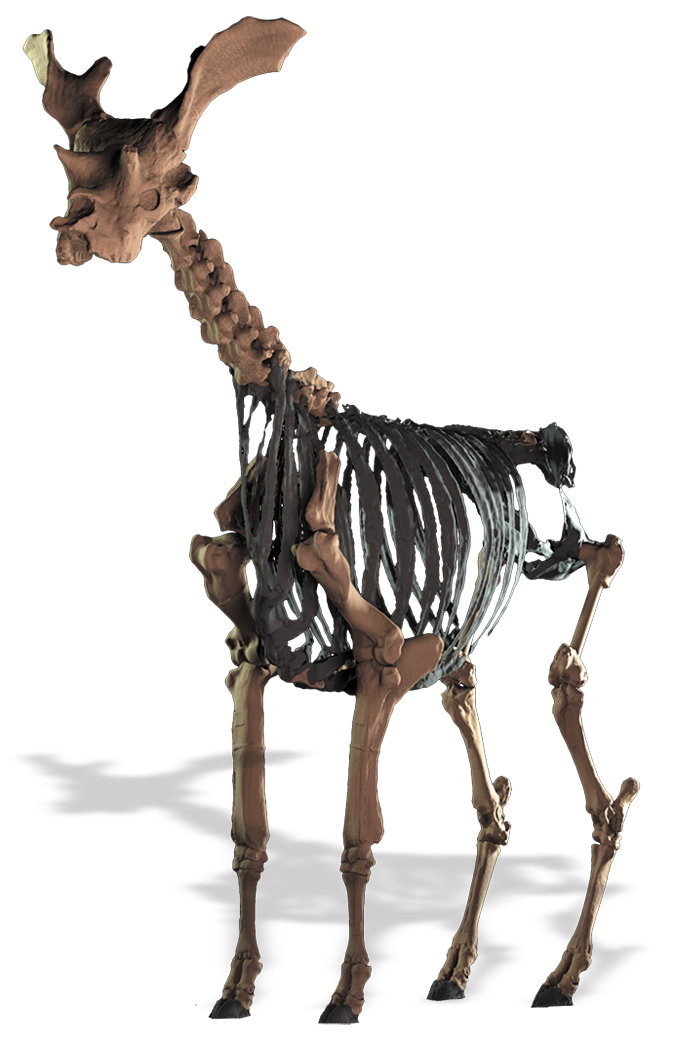
- Reconstructed skeleton (missing lower jaw and tail) of Sivatherium giganteum

Scientific classification
- Kingdom: Animalia
- Phylum: Chordata
- Class: Mammalia
- Order: Artiodactyla
- Family: Giraffidae
- Subfamily: †Sivatheriinae
- Genus: †Sivatherium; Falconer & Cautley, 1836

Type species
- †Sivatherium giganteum Falconer & Cautley, 1836

Species
- †S. giganteum; †?S. hendeyi Harris, 1976; †S. maurusium?

Synonyms
- †Libytherium?

= Sivatherium =

Sivatherium Temporal range: Late Miocene to Early Pleistocene, 7–0.8 Ma

Extinct genus of mammals

Sivatherium ("Shiva's beast", from Shiva and therium, Latinized form of Ancient Greek θηρίον - thēríon) is an extinct genus of giraffid that lived in India, Pakistan, Chad, Kenya, Tunisia, Ethiopia, Morocco, South Africa, Malawi, Kazakhstan, Spain, Tajikistan, Tanzania and Uganda. The species Sivatherium giganteum is, by weight, one of the largest giraffids known, and also one of the largest ruminants of all time. Sivatherium originated during the Late Miocene (around 7 million years ago) in Africa and survived through to the late Early Pleistocene (Calabrian) until around 1 million years ago.

== Description ==
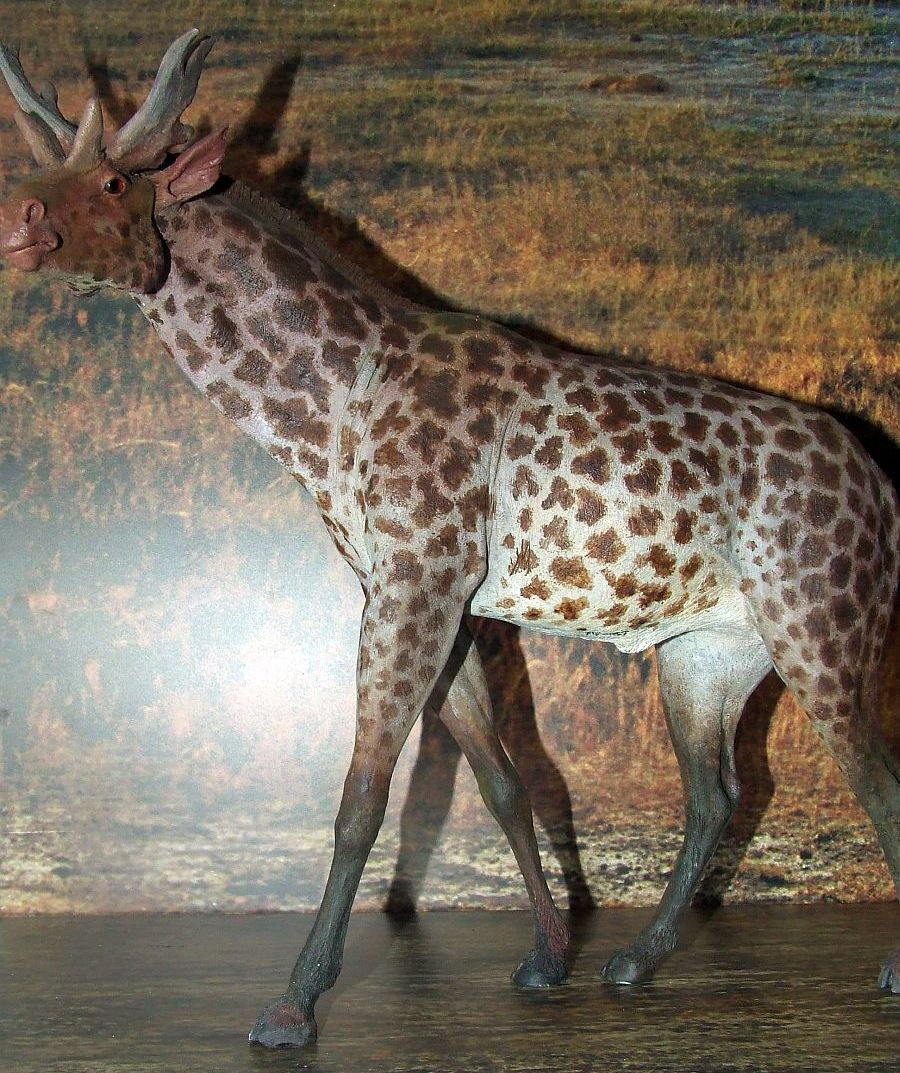
Life restoration of Sivatherium

Sivatherium resembled the modern okapi, but was far larger, and more heavily built, being about 2.2 m (7.2 ft) tall at the shoulder, 3 m (9.8 ft) in total height with a weight up to 400–500 kg (880–1,100 lb). A newer estimate has come up with an estimated average body mass of about 1,246 kg (2,747 lb), with a range of 857–1,812 kg (1,889–3,995 lb). This would make Sivatherium one of the largest known ruminants, rivalling the modern giraffe and the largest bovines. Sivatherium had a wide, antler-like pair of ossicones on its head, and a second pair of ossicones above its eyes. Its shoulders were very powerful to support the neck muscles required to lift the heavy skull. Sivatherium was initially misidentified as an archaic link between modern ruminants and the now obsolete, polyphyletic "pachyderms" (elephants, rhinoceroses, hippopotamuses and tapirs). The confusion arose in part due to its graviportal (robust) morphology, which was unlike anything else studied at that time.

== Palaeobiology ==
A dental wear analysis of S. hendeyi from the Early Pliocene of South Africa found that the teeth were brachyodont, but had a higher hypsodonty than a giraffe, and that it was best classified as a mixed feeder, being able to both graze and browse. Analysis of dental microwear and mesowear paired with δ^{13}C and δ^{18}O measurements of S. maurusium from Ahl al Oughlam in western Morocco show it predominantly fed on C_{3} vegetation.

=== Palaeopathology ===
The osteohistology of S. hendeyi specimens from the Langebaanweg site in South Africa shows numerous interruptions in growth related to extended, non-cyclical stress events likely related to drought, fire, or flooding that decreased food availability.

== Paleoecology ==
=== Locations of fossils ===
Fossils attributed to Sivatherium are known from several localities in Eurasia and Africa.

Species	Formation	Country	Continent
Sivatherium maurusium	Hadar Formation	Ethiopia	Africa
Sivatherium maurusium	Koobi Fora	Kenya	Africa
Sivatherium maurusium	Nkondo Formation	Rwanda	Africa
Sivatherium giganteum	Tatrot Formation	India	Asia
Sivatherium giganteum	Pinjor Formation	India	Asia
Sivatherium giganteum	Karewa formation	India	Asia
Sivatherium giganteum	Nagrota Formation	India	Asia
Sivatherium hendeyi	Varswater Formation	South Africa	Africa
Sivatherium hendeyi	Kanapoi Formation	Kenya	Africa
Sivatherium hendeyi	Toros-Menalla (TM 266)	Chad	Africa
Sivatherium hendeyi	Cigarron Formation	Spain	Europe
Sivatherium sp.	Chiwondo Beds	Malawi	Africa
Sivatherium sp.	FLK I-Level 13	Tanzania	Africa
Sivatherium sp.	Wembere-Manonga Formation	Tanzania	Africa
Sivatherium sp.	Kaiso Village Formation	Uganda	Africa
Sivatherium sp.	Konso	Ethiopia	Africa
Sivatherium sp.	Adu-Asa Formation	Ethiopia	Africa
Sivatherium sp.	Bouri-Hata	Ethiopia	Africa
Sivatherium sp.	Douaria	Tunisia	Africa
Sivatherium sp.	Lissasfa	Morocco	Africa
Sivatherium sp.	Pinjor Formation	Pakistan	Asia
Sivatherium sp.	Kuruksay	Tajikistan	Asia
Sivatherium sp.	Pavlodar	Kazakhstan	Asia

Locations of some Sivatherium fossil discoveries, yellow represent S. giganteum, white represent S. hendeyi and orange represents Sivatherium sp.

== Relationship with humans ==
Remains of Sivatherium from Olduvai Gorge in Tanzania, dating to around 1.35 million years ago have been found associated with stone tools and bearing cut marks, indicating butchery by archaic humans, likely Homo erectus. Historically, it has been suggested that figurines from Sumer and ancient rock paintings in the Sahara and Central West India represent Sivatherium. However, these claims are not substantiated by fossil evidence (which suggest that the genus was extinct long before the emergence of modern humans), and the depictions likely represent other animals.

== See also ==
- Bramatherium
- Vishnutherium
- Prolibytherium
