= Propalaeomeryx =

Scientific classification
- Kingdom: Animalia
- Phylum: Chordata
- Class: Mammalia
- Order: Artiodactyla
- Family: Giraffidae
- Genus: †Propalaeomeryx

Extinct genus of mammals

Propalaeomeryx is an extinct genus of giraffidae. It was first named by Lydekker in 1883.
