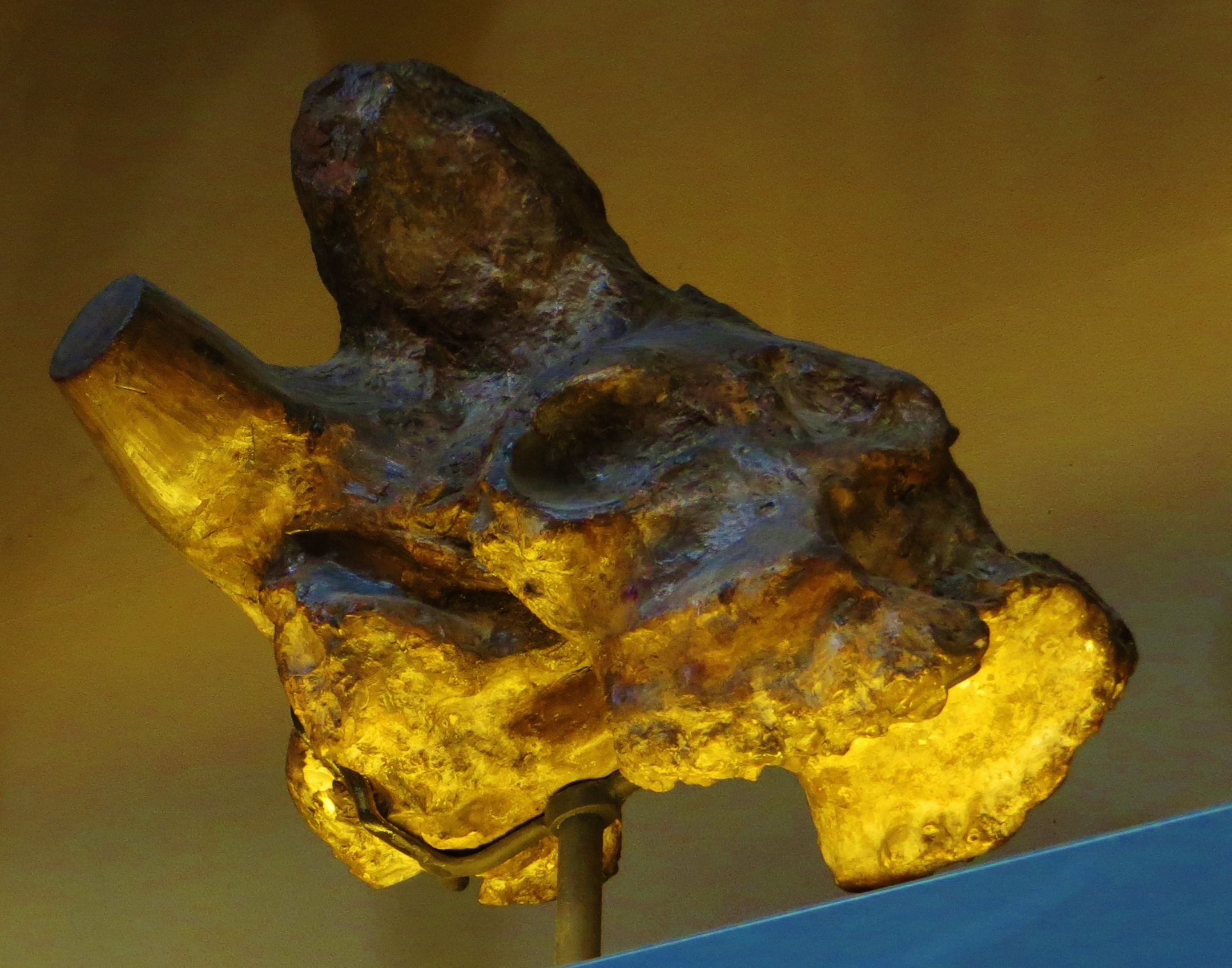
- Bramatherium perimense skull

Scientific classification
- Kingdom: Animalia
- Phylum: Chordata
- Class: Mammalia
- Order: Artiodactyla
- Family: Giraffidae
- Genus: †Bramatherium; Falconer, 1845

Species
- B. perimense (type) Falconer 1845; B. progressus; B. giganteus (Khan and Sarwar 2002); B. megacephalum (Lydekker 1876); B. grande (Lydekker 1880); B. magnum (Pilgrim 1910); B. suchovi Godina 1977

= Bramatherium =

Bramatherium Temporal range: Late Miocene-Pliocene

Extinct genus of mammals

Bramatherium (Brahma’s beast) is an extinct genus of giraffids that ranged from India to Turkey in Asia. It is closely related to the larger Sivatherium.

== Etymology ==
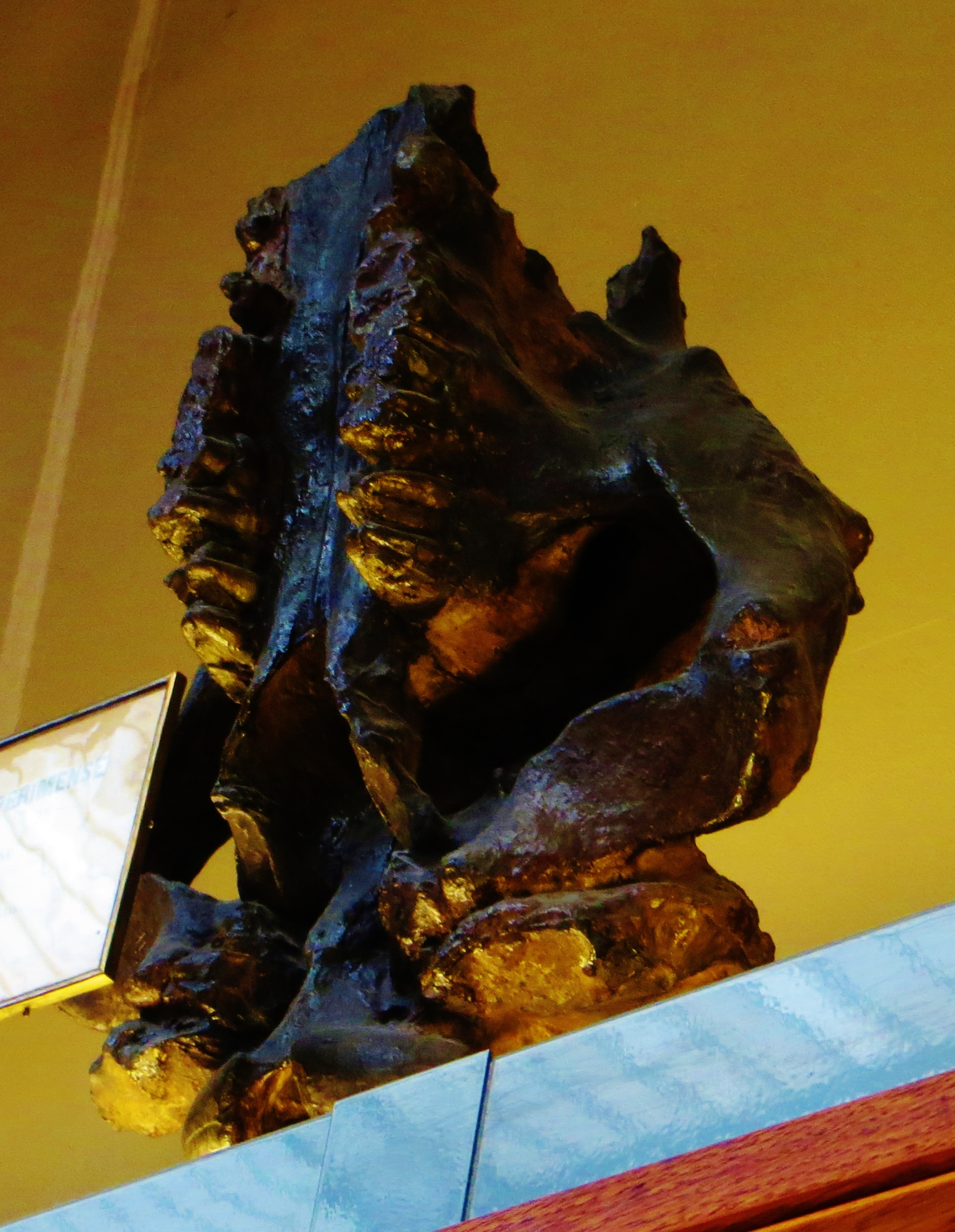
Bramatherium perimense skull

The first part of the generic name, Brahma (Sanskrit masculine brahman-, nominative brahmā ब्रह्मा), is in reference to the Hindu god of creation. The second part, "therium", comes from the Greek word θηρίον (transliterated therion), meaning 'beast'.

== Description ==
Bramatherium was built very similarly to Sivatherium. Alive, it would have resembled a heavily built okapi and had a crown-like set of four, radiating ossicones. Fossils, and examination of teeth in particular, suggested the living animals dwelled woodlands and wetlands.

== Taxonomy ==
In 2025, Kostantis Laskos and colleagues described two ossicones of B. perimense from the Fourka locality of the Greek Chalkidiki Peninsula, close to localities which have yielded the giraffid Helladotherium. They concluded that Helladotherium should be synonymized with Bramatherium based on their overlapping distribution, nearly identical anatomy, and presumed occupation of comparable ecological niches. This synonymy had similarly been suspected by previous researchers. Laskos and colleagues suggested that the lack of ossicones found for Helladatherium had prevented previous phylogenetic analyses from recovering their close relationship. Furthermore, these researchers only recognized two valid and distinct species of Bramatherium, the larger B. grande and the smaller B. perimense, with characters previously thought to be distinctive between all other species simply due to intraspecific variation.

== See also ==
- Sivatherium
- Vishnutherium
