= Palaeogiraffa =

Palaeogiraffa Temporal range: Late Miocene Tortonian to Messinian, 9.7–8.7 Ma

Scientific classification
- Kingdom: Animalia
- Phylum: Chordata
- Class: Mammalia
- Order: Artiodactyla
- Family: Giraffidae
- Genus: †Palaeogiraffa

Extinct genus of mammals

Palaeogiraffa is an extinct genus of giraffidae. It was first named by Bonis and Bouvrain in 2003, and contains one species, P. major. It has only been found at a fossil site in Yulafli, in Turkey.
