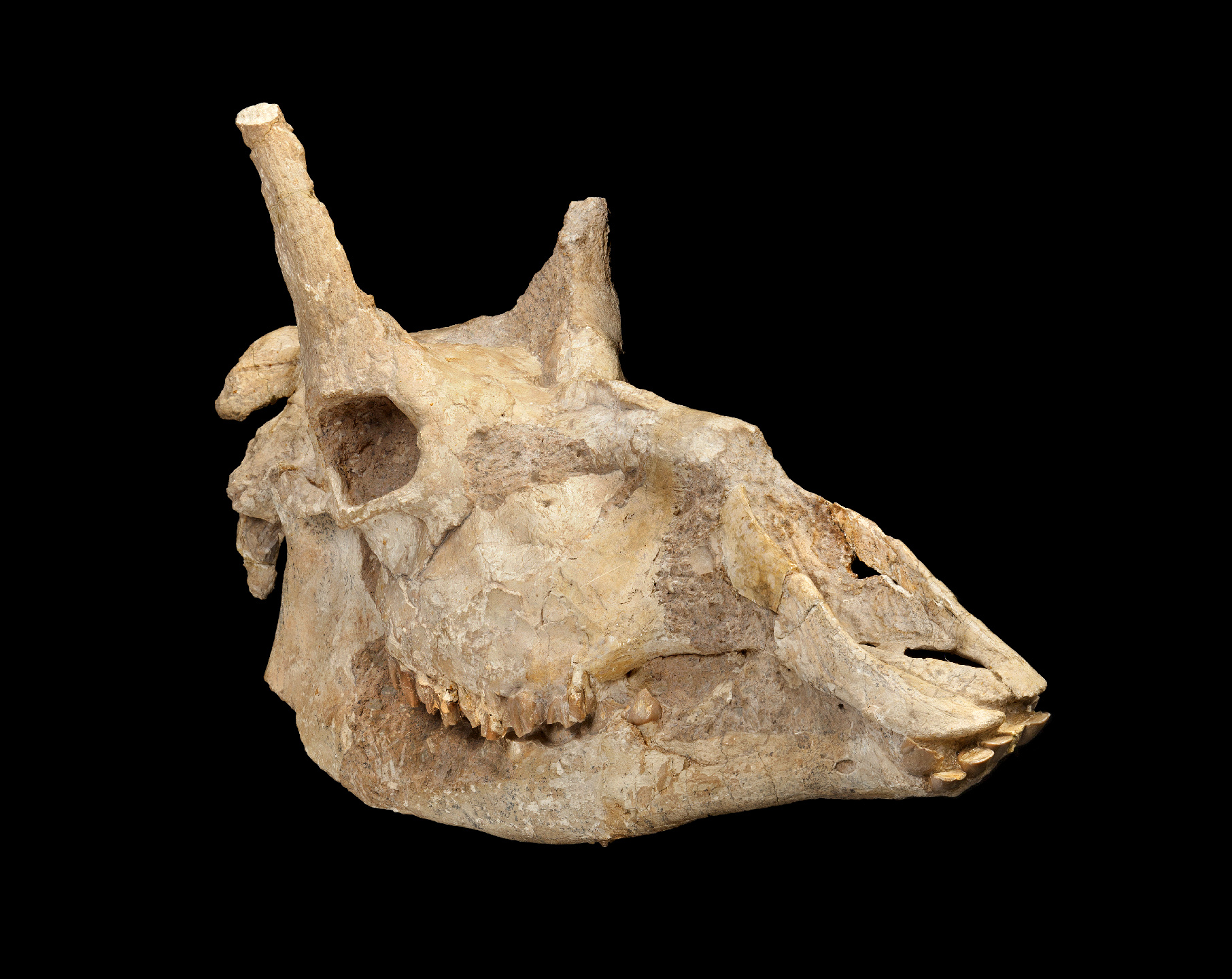
- Samotherium skull

Scientific classification
- Kingdom: Animalia
- Phylum: Chordata
- Class: Mammalia
- Order: Artiodactyla
- Family: Giraffidae
- Genus: †Samotherium; Forsyth Major, 1888

Species
- S. africanum Churcher, 1970; S. boissieri Forsyth-Major, 1889 (type); S. major Bohlin, 1926; S. neumayri Rodler and Weithofer, 1890; S. sinense Bohlin, 1926

= Samotherium =

Samotherium Temporal range: Miocene to Pliocene, 11.608–2.588 Ma

Extinct genus of mammals

Samotherium ("beast of Samos") is an extinct genus belonging to the family Giraffidae from the Miocene and Pliocene of Eurasia and Africa. Samotherium had two ossicones on its head and possessed long legs. The ossicones usually pointed upward, and were curved backwards, with males having larger, more curved ossicones, though in the Chinese species, S. sinense, the straight ossicones point laterally, not upwards. The genus is closely related to Shansitherium. Fossil evidence suggests that Samotherium had a rounded muzzle, which would suggest a grazing lifestyle and a habitat composed of grassland. One common predator of this animal was the Amphimachairodus.

Biologist Richard Ellis has proposed that the skull of Samotherium is portrayed on an ancient Greek vase as a monster that Heracles is fighting. However, other authors have argued that it is more likely to be the skull of a monitor lizard instead.

== Description ==
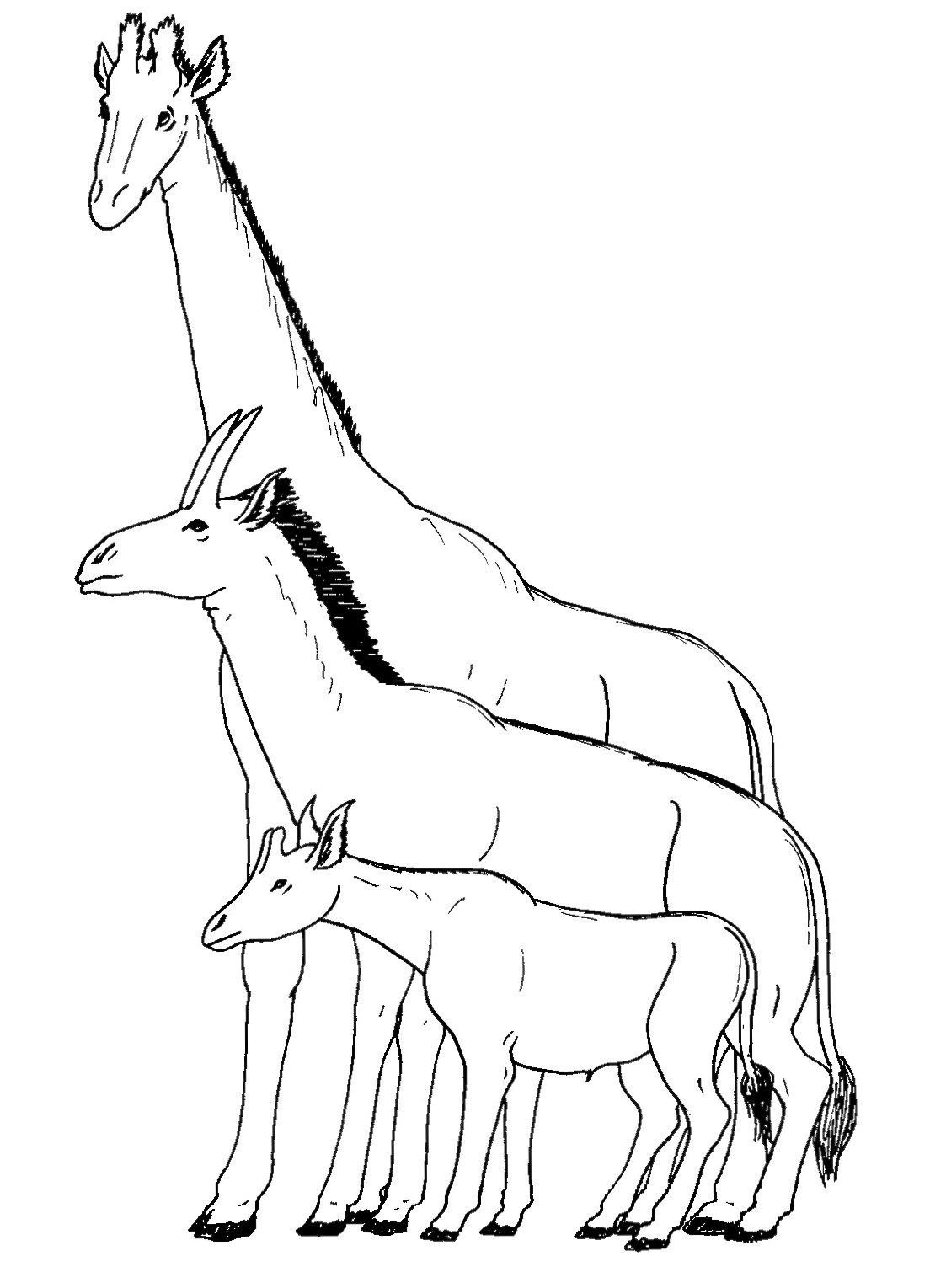
Samotherium major (middle) in comparison with the okapi (below) and giraffe. The anatomy of Samotherium appears to have shown a transition to a giraffe-like neck.

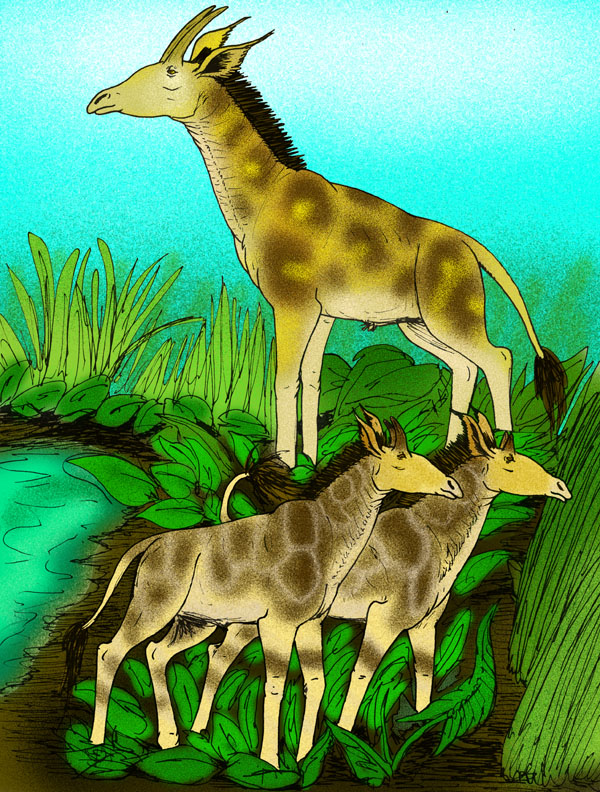
S. major and S. boissieri

A 2015 study found that Samotherium had a neck intermediate in length between the giraffe and the okapi, judging from examination of specimens of S. major from Greece.

== Distribution ==
The species S. major is known from Romania, Greece, and Turkey.

== Palaeoecology ==
The dental microwear of S. boissieri is very similar to that of present-day wildebeest, suggesting that the species was a grazer or at least an intermediate feeder, in contrast to modern browsing giraffes.

S. boissieri had a preference for open environments, while S. major inhabited more closed habitats.
