= Giraffa pygmaea =

Giraffa pygmaea Temporal range: Pliocene to Pleistocene

Scientific classification
- Domain: Eukaryota
- Kingdom: Animalia
- Phylum: Chordata
- Class: Mammalia
- Order: Artiodactyla
- Family: Giraffidae
- Genus: Giraffa
- Species: †G. pygmaea

Binomial name
- †Giraffa pygmaea Harris,1976

Extinct species of mammal

Giraffa pygmaea is an extinct species of giraffe from Africa during the Pliocene, and died out during the Pleistocene about 0.781 million years ago.
