= Ossicone =

Horn-like structure on some animal heads

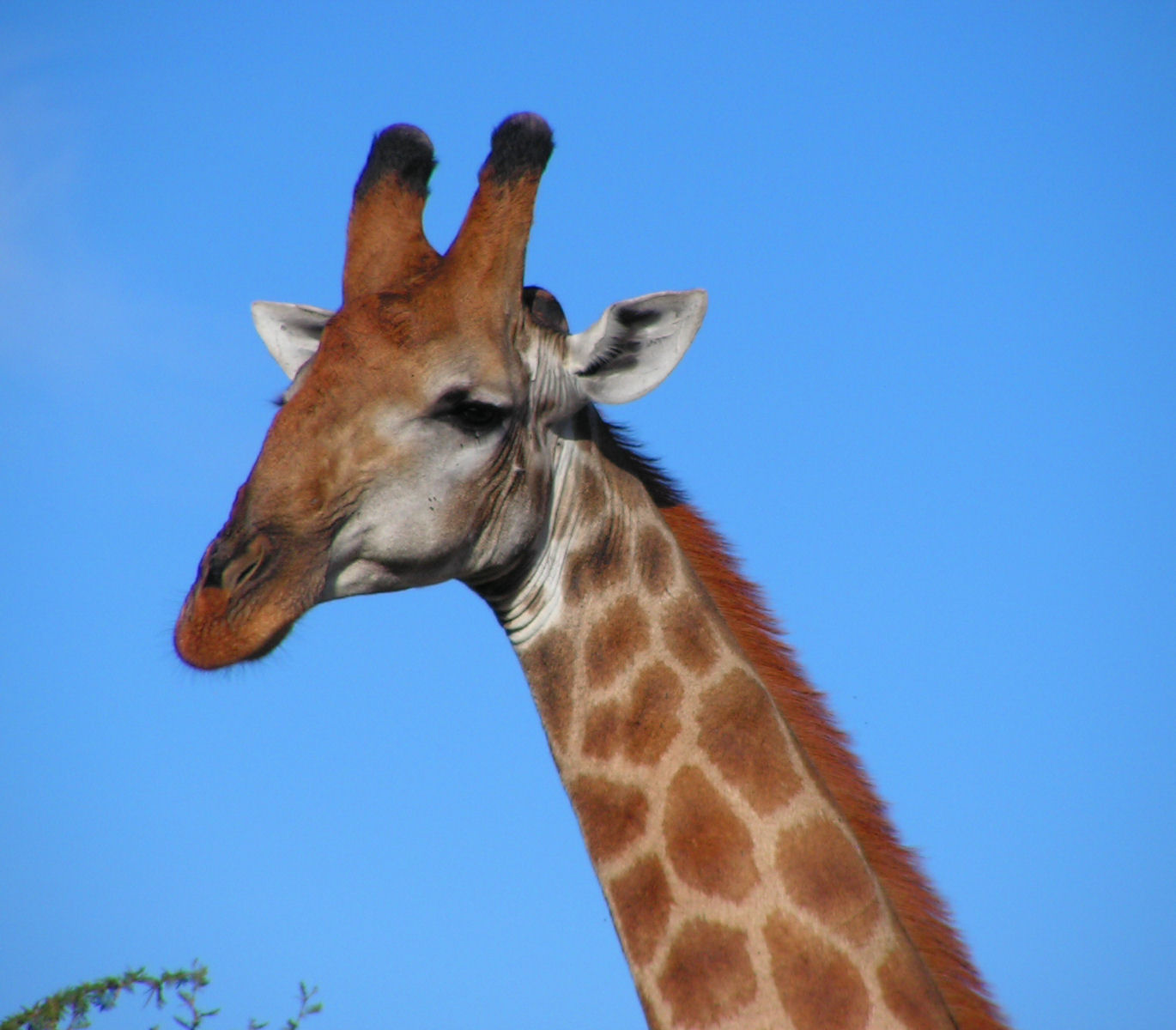
Ossicones of a giraffe

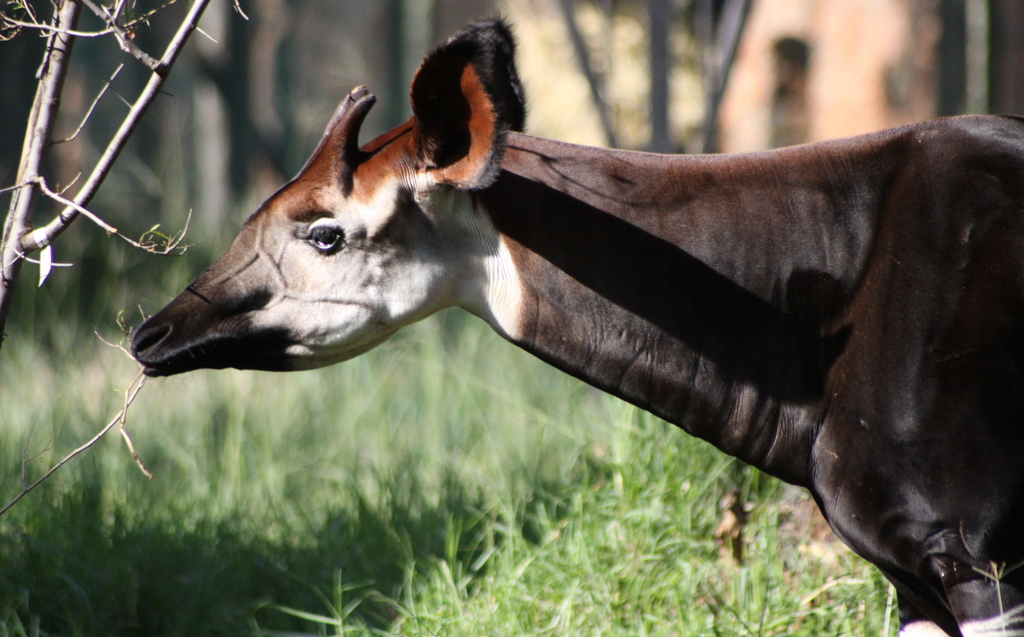
Ossicones of a male okapi

Ossicones are columnar or conical skin-covered bone structures on the heads of giraffes, male okapi, and some of their extinct relatives. Ossicones are distinguished from the superficially similar structures of horns and antlers by their unique development and a permanent covering of skin and fur.

== Structure ==
Giraffe ossicones are highly vascularized and innervated, and consist of bone cores covered with skin, which are attached to the skull with connective tissue. Ossicones are formed at late gestation, but in early development they are not bony or fused to the skull yet. Ossicones usually fuse to the skull at sexual maturity.

All male and female giraffes have a pair of parietal ossicones on the parietal bones of the skull. Males also usually have a single median ossicone on the frontal bone that is larger in northern giraffes and smaller in southern giraffes. Giraffes can also have small additional paired occipital ossicones on the occipital bones, paired orbital ossicones associated with eyes, and azygous ossicones.

In giraffes, male and female ossicones vary in structure and purpose (a manifestation of sexual dimorphism). Males typically have thicker ossicones that become bald on top due to frequent, high-intensity necking. In okapi, the male's ossicones are smaller in proportion to the head, and taper towards their tips, forming a sharper point than the comparatively blunt giraffe ossicone. Whereas female giraffes have reduced ossicones, female okapi lack ossicones entirely.

The morphology of ossicones in the extinct relatives of giraffes and okapi varies widely. Some species had two pairs of ossicones rather than one (e.g. Giraffokeryx), some had rugged textures (e.g. Shansitherium), and some had large, flattened ossicones (e.g. male Prolibytherium).

== Function ==
Similar to species with horns or antlers, male giraffes use their ossicones as weapons during combat, where they use their heads as clubs: the ossicones add weight and concentrate the force of impact onto a small area, allowing it to deliver heavier blows with higher contact pressure. The nerve bundles and large blood supply in the ossicones have led some researchers to speculate that the structures may also play a role in thermoregulation.

== Examples ==
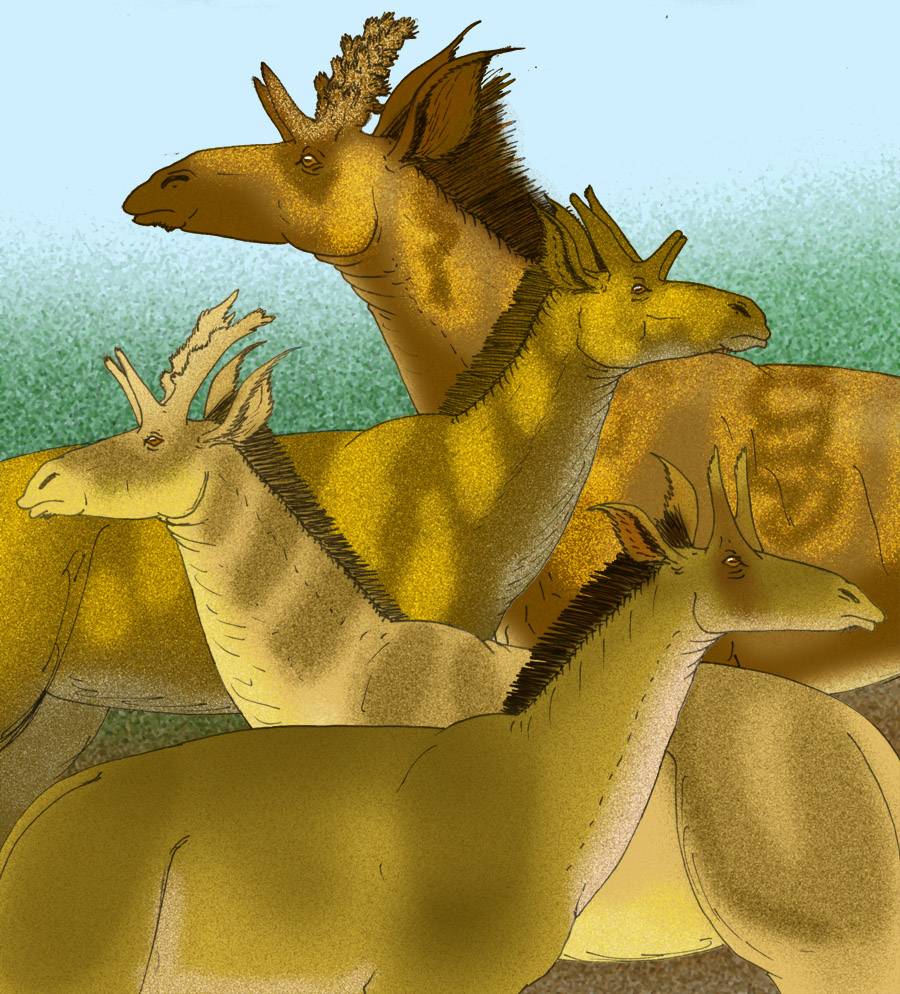
Illustration of extinct Shansitherium species and Palaeotragus microdon (Giraffidae), showing a diversity of ossicone shapes and sizes no longer seen in extant animals

Ossicones are only found in some members of the superfamily Giraffoidea, which includes the family Giraffidae (to which giraffes, okapi, and extinct relatives belong) and the entirely extinct family Climacoceratidae. It had been argued that the so-called ossicones known from fossils were actually horns, but later research showed that these structures are consistent with the ossicones of giraffes and okapi. The following is a list of some ossicone-bearing genera:

Giraffidae

- †Bramatherium (2 pairs)
- †Decennatherium (1 pair)
- Giraffa (giraffes; 1 pair)
- †Giraffokeryx (2 pairs)
- †Honanotherium (1 pair)
- †Injanatherium (2 pairs) – Angled horizontally relative to head
- †Mitilanotherium (1 pair)
- Okapia (okapi; 1–0 pairs) – Females lack ossicones
- †Palaeotragus (1–0 pairs) – Some species lacked ossicones
- †Samotherium (1 pair)
- †Shansitherium (1 pair)
- †Sivatherium (2 pairs)

Climacoceratidae

- †Climacoceras (1 pair)
- †Prolibytherium (1 pair) – Male ossicones plate-like; females more typical
