= Libytherium =

Libytherium Temporal range: Late Miocene to Middle Pleistocene, 13.7–0.8 Ma

Scientific classification
- Kingdom: Animalia
- Phylum: Chordata
- Class: Mammalia
- Order: Artiodactyla
- Family: Giraffidae
- Genus: †Libytherium; Pomel, 1892

Type species
- †Libytherium maurusium Pomel, 1892

Species
- †L. maurusium Pomel, 1892; †L. proton Rios, 2022

Extinct genus of mammals

Libytherium is an extinct genus of large sized giraffid that is known from Miocene to Pleistocene of Africa and the Indian subcontinent. The type species Libytherium maurusium is first known from fossils collected from the Pliocene deposits of Oran, Algeria with subsequent fossils from Mio-Pleistocene beds in South Africa, Egypt, Morocco, Tunisia, Tanzania, Uganda, Kenya and Ethiopia, the second species Libytherium proton is known from Miocene beds of Chinji Formation and Dhok Pathan Formation of Siwalik Hills of Indo-Pakistan.

== Taxonomy ==
The first fossils of Libytherium, which consists of a partial right mandible, were first collected by M. Brunie from Pliocene aged qurry near Oran in Saint Charles district of Algeria. In 1892 N. A. Pomel described the remains as belonging to a large giraffid similar to Helladotherium in size and morphology, but with a distinctive mandible, for which he coined the new name Libytherium maurusium. The generic name "Libytherium" combines the words "Liby", after Libya (although the specimen itself was discovered in Algeria), and θηρίον (therión) meaning beast. The etymology of the specific name "maurusium" is unknown.
