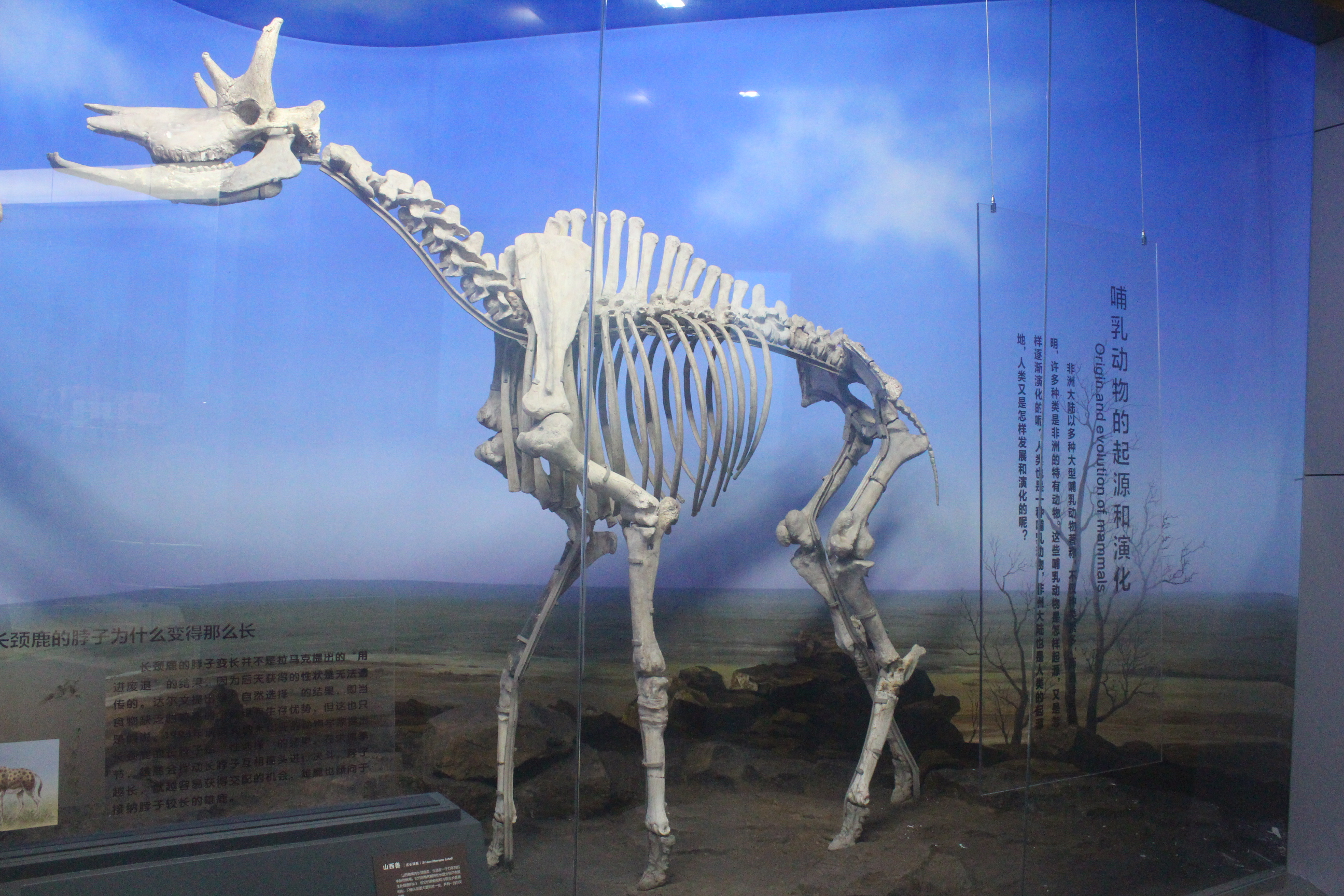
- Skeletal mount of S. tafeli, Beijing Museum of Natural History

Scientific classification
- Kingdom: Animalia
- Phylum: Chordata
- Class: Mammalia
- Order: Artiodactyla
- Family: Giraffidae
- Genus: †Schansitherium; Kilgus 1922

Species
- †S. fuguensis; †S. quadricornis; †S. tafeli

Synonyms
- Shansitherium (lapsus calami)

= Schansitherium =

Schansitherium Temporal range: Late Miocene

Extinct genus of mammals

Schansitherium ("beast of Shanxi") is an extinct genus of superficially moose-like or antelope-like giraffids from the late Miocene epoch of Shanxi Province, China. They are closely related to the genus Samotherium.

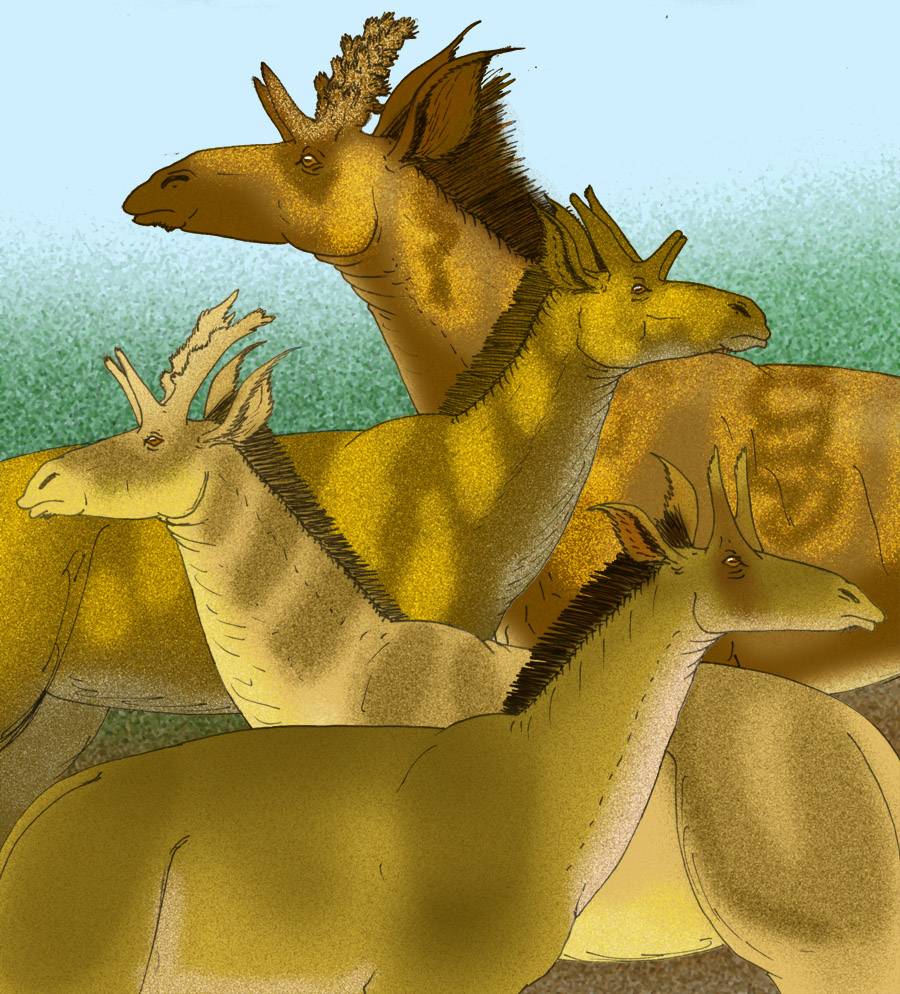
Illustration of Schansitherium species and Palaeotragus microdon
