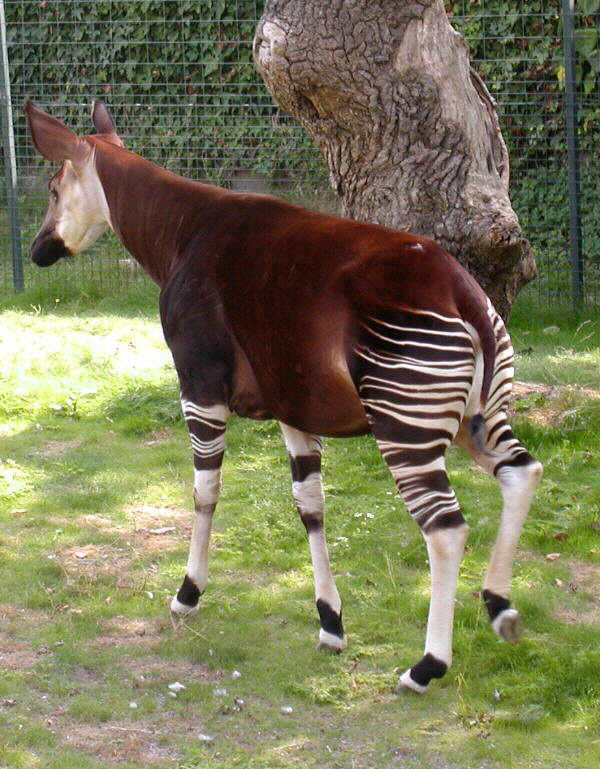
- An okapi in Bristol Zoo, England
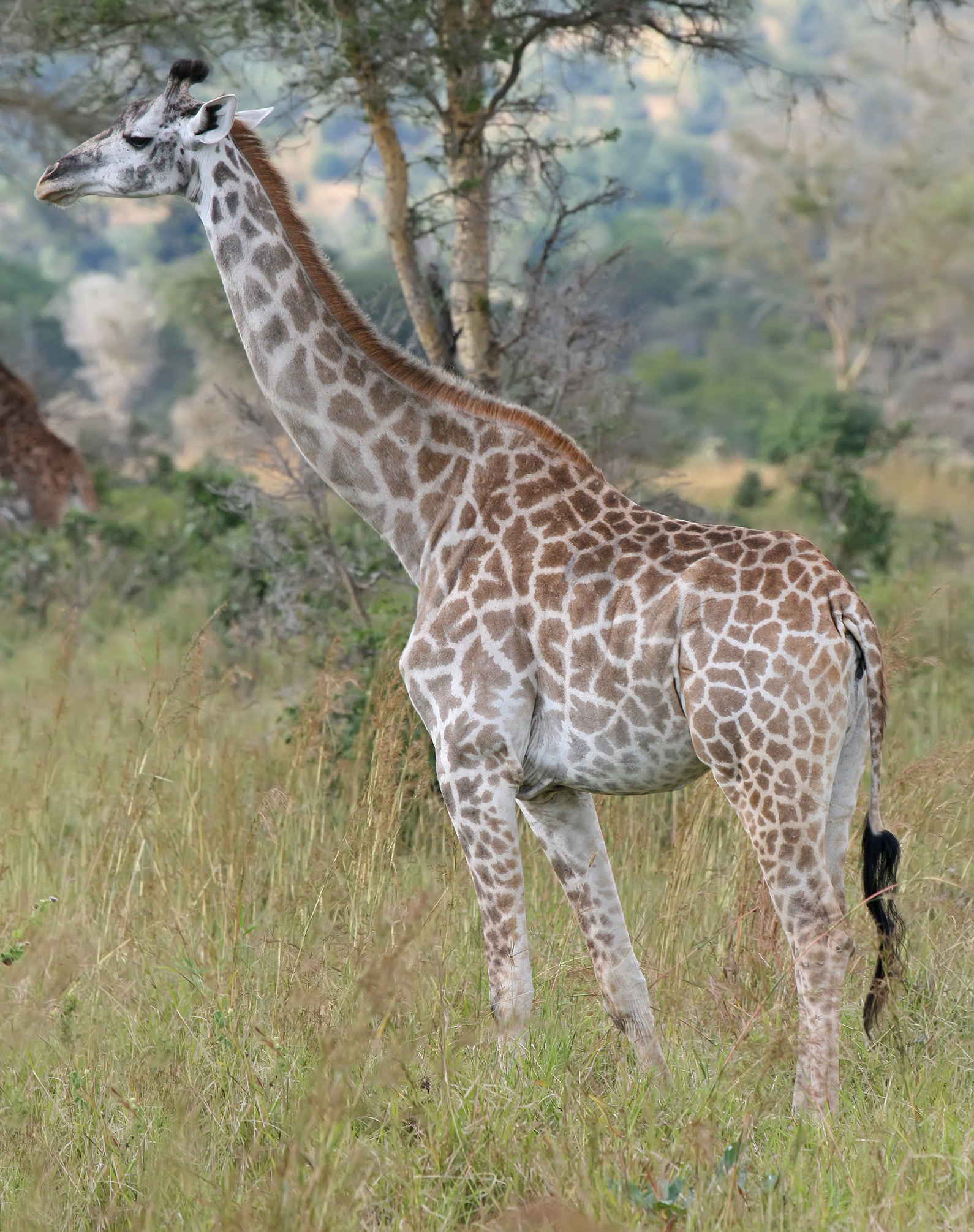
- Masai giraffe (G. tippelskirchi) at the Mikumi National Park, Tanzania

Scientific classification
- Kingdom: Animalia
- Phylum: Chordata
- Class: Mammalia
- Order: Artiodactyla
- Superfamily: Giraffoidea
- Family: Giraffidae; Gray, 1821

Type genus
- Giraffa Linnaeus, 1758

Subfamilies
- †Canthumerycinae; †Sivatheriinae; Giraffinae
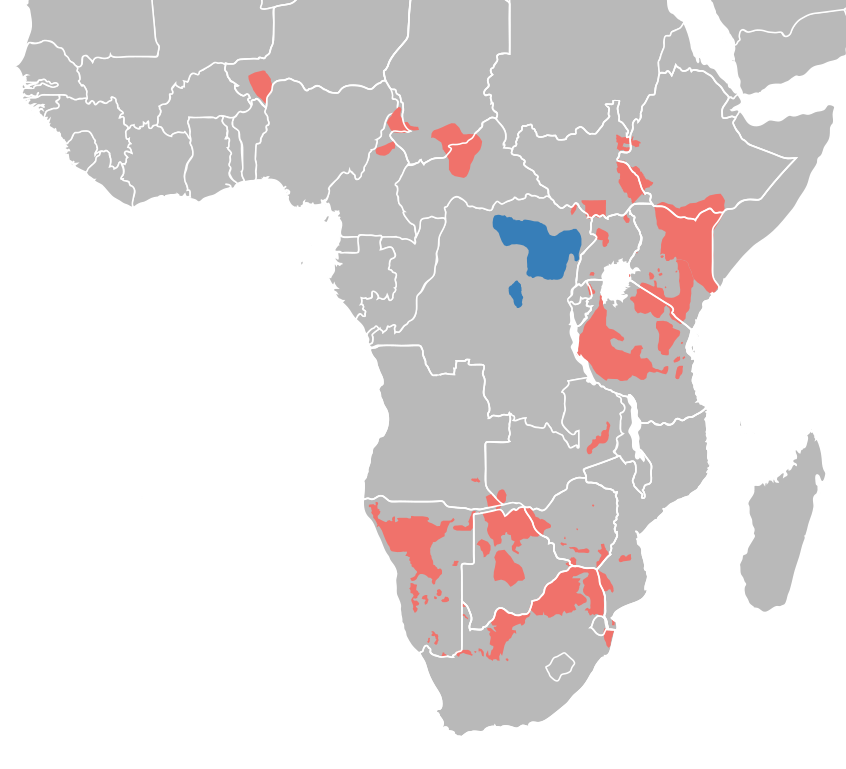
- Distribution of extant giraffids: Giraffa in red, Okapia in blue.

= Giraffidae =

Giraffidae Temporal range: 20–0 Ma Early Miocene – recent

Family of mammals belonging to even-toed ungulates

The Giraffidae are a family of ruminant artiodactyl mammals that share a recent common ancestor with deer and bovids. This family, once a diverse group spread throughout Eurasia and Africa, presently comprises only two extant genera, the giraffe (between one and eight, usually four, species of Giraffa, depending on taxonomic interpretation) and the okapi (the only known species of Okapia). Both are confined to sub-Saharan Africa: the giraffe to the open savannas, and the okapi to the dense rainforest of the Congo. The two genera look very different on first sight, but share a number of common features, including a long, dark-coloured tongue, lobed canine teeth, and horns covered in skin, called ossicones.

== Taxonomy ==
| Image | Genus | Living species |
|---|---|---|
| | Okapia | Okapia johnstoni |
| | Giraffa | One species taxonomy: Giraffa camelopardalis; Four species taxonomy: Giraffa camelopardalis; Giraffa giraffa; Giraffa reticulata; Giraffa tippelskirchi; Eight species taxonomy: Giraffa camelopardalis; Giraffa antiquorum; Giraffa peralta; Giraffa giraffa; Giraffa angolensis; Giraffa reticulata; Giraffa tippelskirchi; Giraffa thornicrofti |

=== Evolutionary background ===
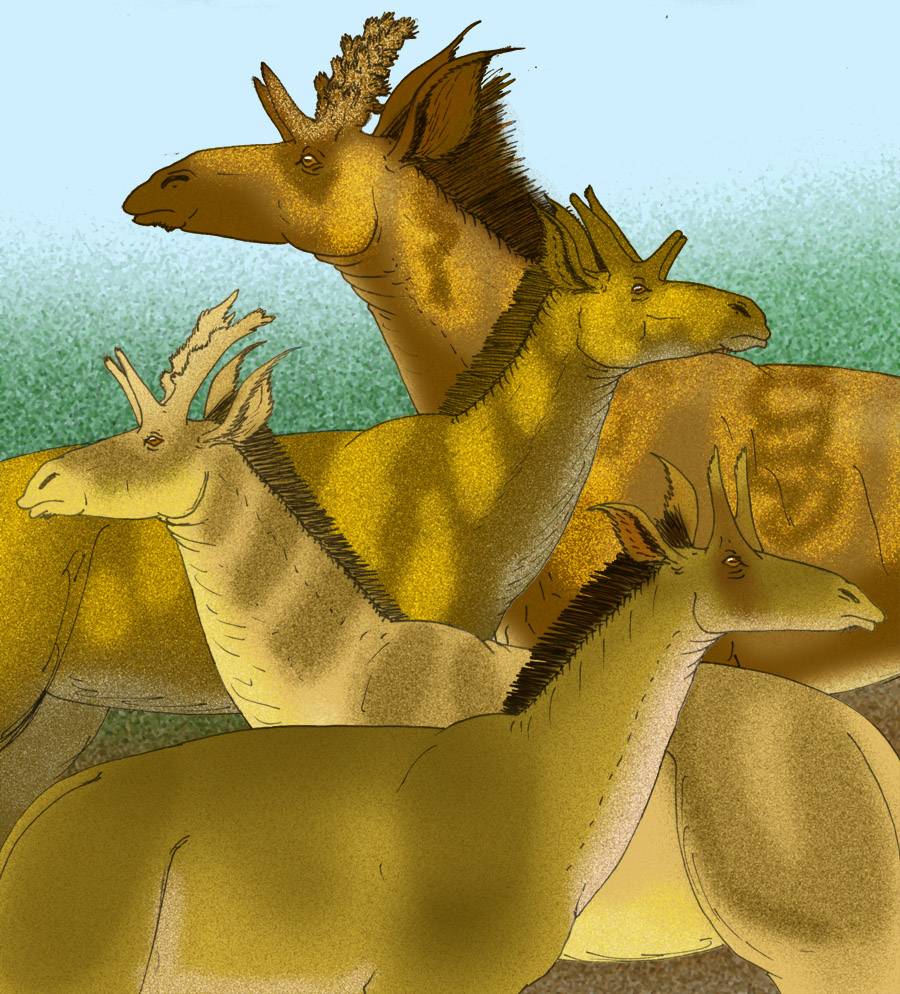
Shansitherium and Palaeotragus microdon, two extinct giraffids from the Miocene of Asia

The giraffids are ruminants of the clade Pecora. Other extant pecorans are the families Antilocapridae (pronghorns), Cervidae (deer), Moschidae (musk deer), and Bovidae (cattle, goats and sheep, wildebeests and allies, and antelopes). The exact interrelationships among the pecorans have been debated, mainly focusing on the placement of Giraffidae, but a recent large-scale ruminant genome sequencing study suggests Antilocapridae are the sister taxon to Giraffidae, as shown in the cladogram below.

- Ruminantia
  - Tragulina
    Tragulidae
  - Pecora
    - - Antilocapridae
      - Giraffidae
    - - Cervidae
      - - Bovidae
        - Moschidae

The ancestors of pronghorn diverged from the giraffids in the Early Miocene. This was in part of a relatively late mammal diversification following a climate change that transformed subtropical woodlands into open savannah grasslands.

The fossil record of giraffids and their stem-relatives is quite intensive, with fossil of these taxa include Gelocidae, Palaeomerycidae, Prolibytheridae, and Climacoceratidae. It is thought that the palaeomerycids, prolibytherids, climacoceratids and the giraffids all form a clade of pecorans known as Giraffomorpha. The relationship between the climacoceratids and giraffids is supported by the presence of a bilobed canine, and have been postulated into two hypotheses. One is the climacoceratids were the ancestors of the sivatheres, as both groups were large, deer-like giraffoids with branching antler-like ossicones, while an extinct basal group of giraffoids, canthumerycines, evolved into the ancestors of Giraffidae. Another more commonly supported hypothesis is climacoceratids were merely the sister clade to giraffids, with sivatheres being either basal giraffids or descended from a lineage that also includes the okapi. While the current range of giraffids today is in Africa, the fossil record of the group has shown this family was once widespread throughout of Eurasia.

By the Pliocene, giraffids had been displaced from many Afro-Eurasian fossil assemblages by cervids and bovids, whose faster life history, contrasting with the long gestation periods of giraffids, may have provided an advantage at exploiting a greater diversity of niches than giraffids, particularly in the context of the cooling climate of the latter part of the Neogene, during which both cervids and bovids experienced rapid rates of evolution.

Below is the phylogenetic relationships of giraffomorphs after Solounias (2007), Sánchez et al. (2015) and Ríos et al. (2017):

- Giraffomorpha
  - †Palaeomerycidae
  - - Giraffoidea
      - †Prolibytheridae
      - - †Climacoceratidae
        - - Giraffidae
            - †Canthumerycinae (Note: A grade of giraffids.)
            - - †Giraffokerycinae
              - - - †Bohlininae
                  - Giraffinae
                - - †Palaeotraginae
                  - - Okapiinae
                    - - †Samotheriinae (Note: A paraphyletic grade of palaeotragines ancestral to Sivatheriinae.)
                      - †Sivatheriinae

=== Classification ===
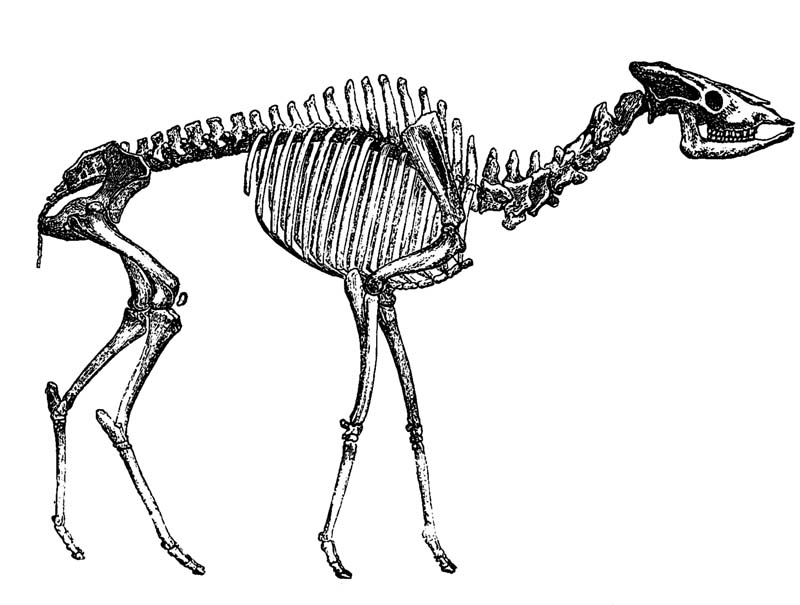
Skeletal illustration of Helladotherium, now extinct

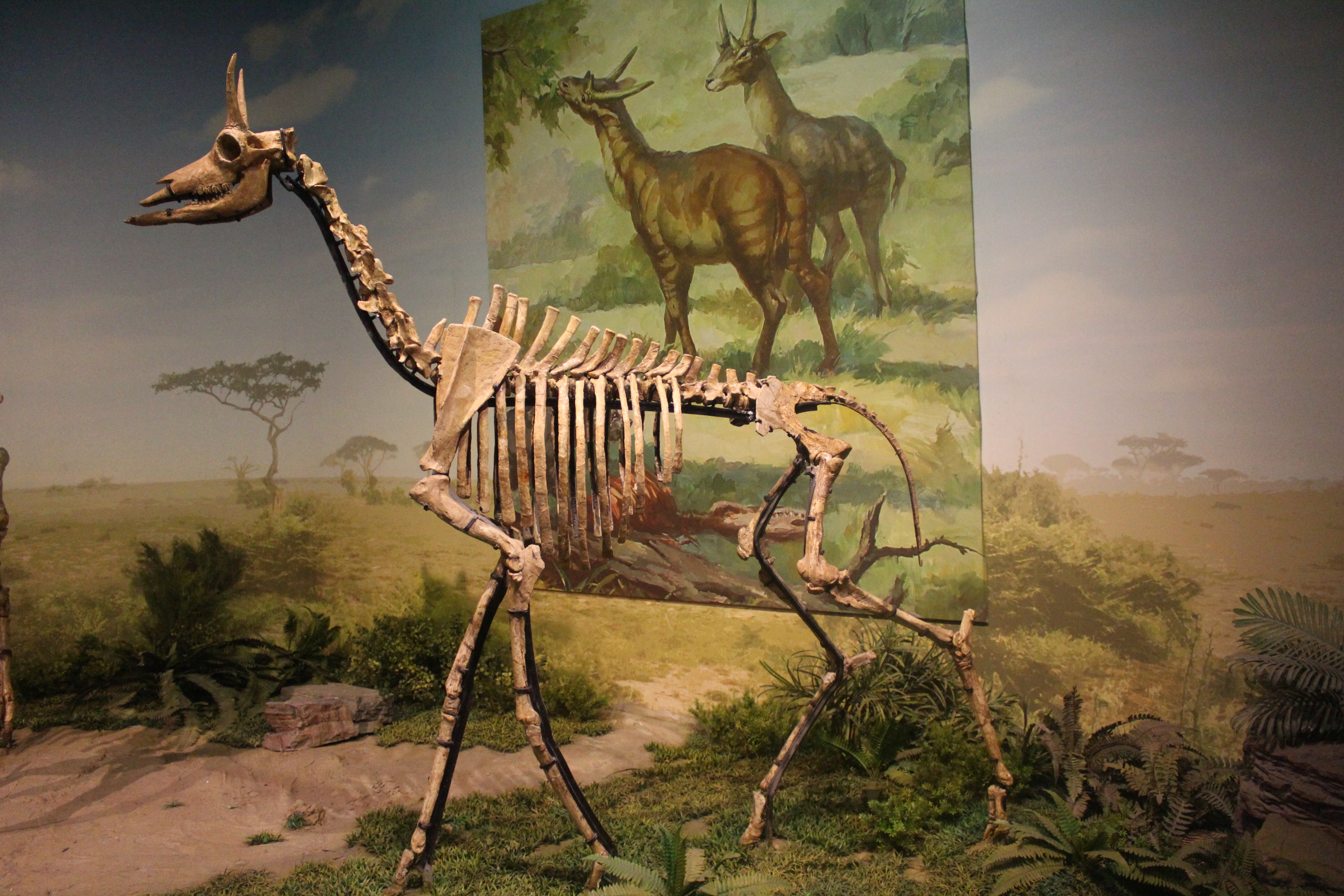
Skeletal mount of Palaeotragus on display at the Tianjin Natural History Museum.

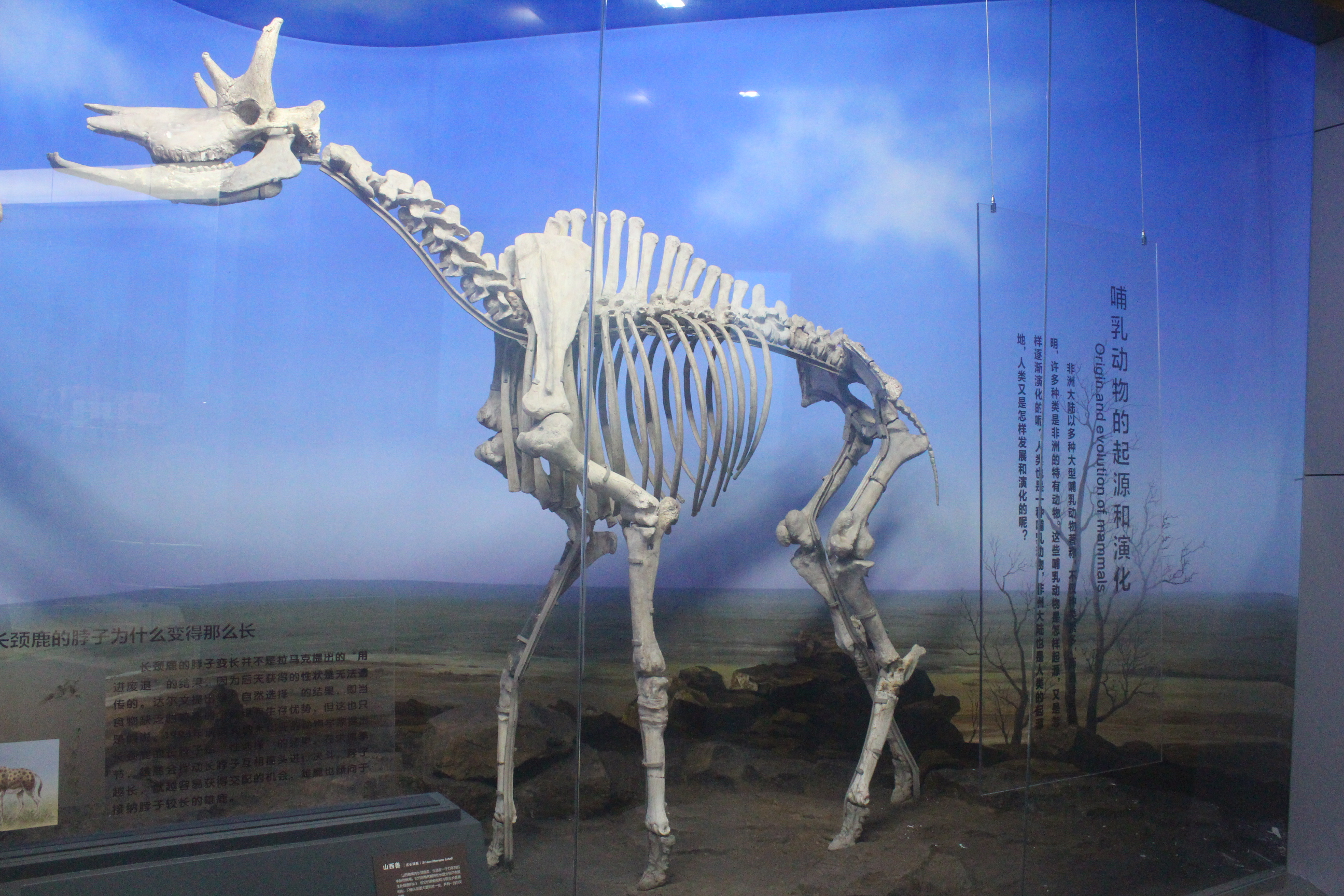
Skeletal mount of Shansitherium tafeli on display at the Beijing Museum of Natural History.

Below is the total taxonomy of valid extant and fossil taxa (as well as junior synonyms which are listed in the brackets).

Family Giraffidae J.E.Gray, 1821

- Basal extinct giraffids
  - †Csakvarotherium Kretzoi, 1930
    - †Csakvarotherium hungaricum Kretzoi, 1930
  - †Injanatherium Heintz, Brunet & Sen, 1981
    - †Injanatherium arabicum Morales, Soria & Thomas, 1987
    - †Injanatherium hazimi Heintz, Brunet & Sen, 1981
  - †Propalaeomeryx Lydekker, 1883 [Progiraffa Pilgrim, 1908]
    - †Propalaeomeryx sivalensis Lydekker, 1883 [Progiraffa exigua Pilgrim, 1908]
  - †Shansitherium Killgus, 1922 [Schansitherium [sic]]
    - †Shansitherium quadricornis (Bohlin, 1926) [Palaeotragus quadricornis Bohlin, 1926]
    - †Shansitherium tafeli Killgus, 1922
  - †Umbrotherium Abbazzi, Delfino, Gallai, Trebini & Rook, 2008
    - †Umbrotherium azzarolii Abbazzi, Delfino, Gallai, Trebini & Rook, 2008
- Subfamily †Canthumerycinae Hamilton, 1978
  - †Georgiomeryx Paraskevaidis, 1940
    - †Georgiomeryx georgalasi Paraskevaidis, 1940
  - †Canthumeryx Hamilton 1973 [Zarafa Hamilton, 1973]
    - †Canthumeryx sirtensis Hamilton 1973 [Zarafa zelteni Hamilton, 1973]
- Subfamily †Progiraffinae Pilgrim, 1911
  - †Palaeogiraffa Bonis & Bouvrain, 2003
    - †Palaeogiraffa macedoniae (Geraads, 1989) [Decennatherium macedoniae Geraads, 1989]
    - †Palaeogiraffa major Bonis & Bouvrain, 2003
    - †Palaeogiraffa pamiri (Ozansoy, 1965) [Samotherium pamiri Ozansoy, 1965]
- Subfamily †Giraffokerycinae Solounias, 2007
  - †Giraffokeryx Pilgrim, 1910
    - †Giraffokeryx anatoliensis Geraads & Aslan, 2003
    - †Giraffokeryx primaevus (Churcher, 1970) [Palaeotragus primaevus Churcher, 1970; Samotherium africanum Churcher, 1970 and Amotherium africanum [sic]]
    - †Giraffokeryx punjabiensis Pilgrim, 1910
- Subfamily Giraffinae J.E.Gray, 1821
  - Tribe Giraffini J.E.Gray, 1821
    - †Orea Solounias & Ríos, 2025
      - †Orea leptia Solounias & Ríos, 2025
    - Giraffa Brisson, 1762 [Camelopardalis von Schreber, 1784 and Orasius Oken, 1816]
      - Giraffa giraffa (von Schreber, 1784)
        - Giraffa giraffa angolensis Lydekker, 1903 – Angolan giraffe
        - Giraffa giraffa giraffa (von Schreber, 1784) – South African giraffe
      - Giraffa tippelskirchii Matschie, 1898
        - Giraffa tippelskirchii thornicrofti Lydekker, 1911 – Thornicroft's giraffe
        - Giraffa tippelskirchii tippelskirchii Matschie, 1898 – Masai giraffe
      - Giraffa reticulata de Winton, 1899 – Reticulated giraffe
      - Giraffa camelopardalis (Linnaeus, 1758) – Northern giraffe
        - Giraffa camelopardalis peralta Thomas, 1898 – West African giraffe
        - Giraffa camelopardalis antiquorum Jardine & Swainson, 1835 – Kordofan giraffe
        - Giraffa camelopardalis camelopardalis (Linnaeus, 1758) – Nubian giraffe [Giraffa camelopardalis rothschildi Lydekker, 1903 – Rothschild's giraffe]
      - †Giraffa jumae Leakey, 1967
      - †Giraffa priscilla Pilgrim, 1911
      - †Giraffa punjabiensis Pilgrim, 1911
      - †Giraffa pygmaea Harris, 1976
      - †Giraffa sivalensis (Falconer & Cautley, 1843) [Camelopardalis sivalensis Falconer & Cautley, 1843 and Camelopardalis affinis Falconer & Cautley, 1843]
      - †Giraffa stillei (Dietrich, 1942) [Okapia stillei Dietrich, 1942 and Giraffa gracilis Arambourg, 1947]
  - Tribe †Bohlinini Solounias, 2007
    - †Honanotherium Bohlin, 1927
      - †Honanotherium bernori Solounias & Danowitz, 2016
      - †Honanotherium schlosseri (Pilgrim, 1911) [Giraffa schlosseri Pilgrim, 1911]
    - †Qilin Wang et al., 2025
      - †Qilin tungurensis (Colbert, 1936) [Palaeotragus tungurensis Colbert, 1936]
    - †Bohlinia Matthew, 1929
      - †Bohlinia adoumi Likius, Vignaud & Brunet, 2007
      - †Bohlinia attica (Gaudry & Lartet, 1856) [Giraffa attica (Gaudry & Lartet, 1856) and Orasius attica (Gaudry & Lartet, 1856)]
      - †Bohlinia nikitiae Kostopoulos, Koliadimou & Koufos, 1996
  - Tribe Palaeotragini Pilgrim, 1910
    - Subtribe †Palaeotragina Pilgrim, 1910
      - †Mitilanotherium Samson & Radulesco, 1966 [Macedonitherium Sickenberg, 1967; Sogdianotherium Sharapov, 1974]
        - †Mitilanotherium inexpectatum Samson & Radulesco, 1966[Macedonitherium martinii Sickenberg, 1967; Mitilanotherium inexpectatum Samson & Radulesco, 1966; Mitilanotherium kuruksaense (Sharapov, 1974); Mitilanotherium martinii (Sickenberg, 1967); Palaeotragus inexspectatus (Samson & Radulesco, 1966); Palaeotragus priasovicus Godina & Bajgusheva, 1985 and Sogdianotherium kuruksaense Sharapov, 1974]
      - †Palaeotragus Gaudry, 1861 [Achtiaria Borissiak, 1914]
        - †Palaeotragus coelophrys (Rodler & Weithofer, 1890) [Alcicephalus coelophrys Rodler & Weithofer, 1890]
        - †Palaeotragus germaini Arambourg, 1959
        - †Palaeotragus lavocanti Heintz, 1976
        - †Palaeotragus robinsoni Crusafont-Pairó, 1979
        - †Palaeotragus rouenii Gaudry, 1861 [Palaeotragus microdon Koken, 1885]
      - †Praepalaeotragus Godina, Vislobokova & Abdrachmanova, 1993
        - †Praepalaeotragus actaensis Godina, Vislobokova & Abdrachmanova, 1993
      - †Samotherium Forsyth Major, 1888 [Alcicephalus Rodler & Weithofer, 1890; Chersenotherium Alexajew, 1916 and Amotherium [sic]]
        - †Samotherium boissieri Forsyth Major, 1888
        - †Samotherium eminens (Alexajew, 1916) [Chersenotherium eminens Alexajew, 1916]
        - †Samotherium major Bohlin, 1926
        - †Samotherium neumayri (Rodler & Weithofer, 1890) [Alcicephalus neumayri Rodler & Weithofer, 1890]
        - †Samotherium sinense (Schlosser, 1903) [Alcicephalus sinense Schlosser, 1903]
    - Subtribe Okapiina Bohlin, 1926
      - †Afrikanokeryx Harris, Solounias & Geraads, 2010
        - †Afrikanokeryx leakeyi Harris, Solounias & Geraads, 2010
      - Okapia Lankester, 1901
        - Okapia johnstoni (P. L. Sclater, 1901) – Okapi
- †Subfamily Sivatheriinae Bonaparte, 1850
  - †Birgerbohlinia Crusafont Pairó, 1952
    - †Birgerbohlinia schaubi Crusafont Pairó, 1952
  - †Bramatherium Falconer, 1845 [Hydaspitherium Lydekker, 1876]
    - †Bramatherium giganteus Khan & Sarwar, 2002
    - †Bramatherium grande (Lydekker, 1878) [Hydaspitherium grande Lydekker, 1878]
    - †Bramatherium magnum (Pilgrim, 1910) [Hydaspitherium magnum Pilgrim, 1910]
    - †Bramatherium megacephalum (Lydekker, 1876) [Hydaspitherium megacephalum Lydekker, 1876]
    - †Bramatherium perimense Falconer, 1845
    - †Bramatherium progressus Khan, Sarwar & Khan, 1993
    - †Bramatherium suchovi Godina, 1977
  - †Decennatherium Crusafont Pairó, 1952
    - †Decennatherium rex Ríos, Sánchez & Morales, 2017
    - †Decennatherium pachecoi Crusafont Pairó, 1952
  - †Helladotherium Gaudry, 1860
    - †Helladotherium duvernoyi (Gaudry & Lartet, 1856) [Camelopardalis duvernoyi Gaudry & Lartet, 1856]
  - †Lyrakeryx Ríos & Solounias, 2025
    - †Lyrakeryx sherkana Ríos & Solounias, 2025
  - †Sivatherium Falconer & Cautley, 1836 [Griquatherium Haughton, 1922; Indratherium Pilgrim, 1910; Libytherium Pomel, 1892 and Orangiatherium van Hoepen, 1932]
    - †Sivatherium giganteum Falconer & Cautley, 1836
    - †Sivatherium hendeyi Harris, 1976
    - †Sivatherium maurusium (Pomel, 1892) [Libytherium maurusium Pomel, 1892; Griquatherium cingulatum Haughton, 1922; Helladotherium olduvaiense Hopwood, 1934; Sivatherium olduvaiense (Hopwood, 1934); Libytherium olduvaiense Hopwood, 1934 and Orangiatherium vanrhyni van Hoepen, 1932]
  - †Vishnutherium Lydekker, 1876
    - †Vishnutherium iravadicum Lydekker, 1876

== Characteristics ==
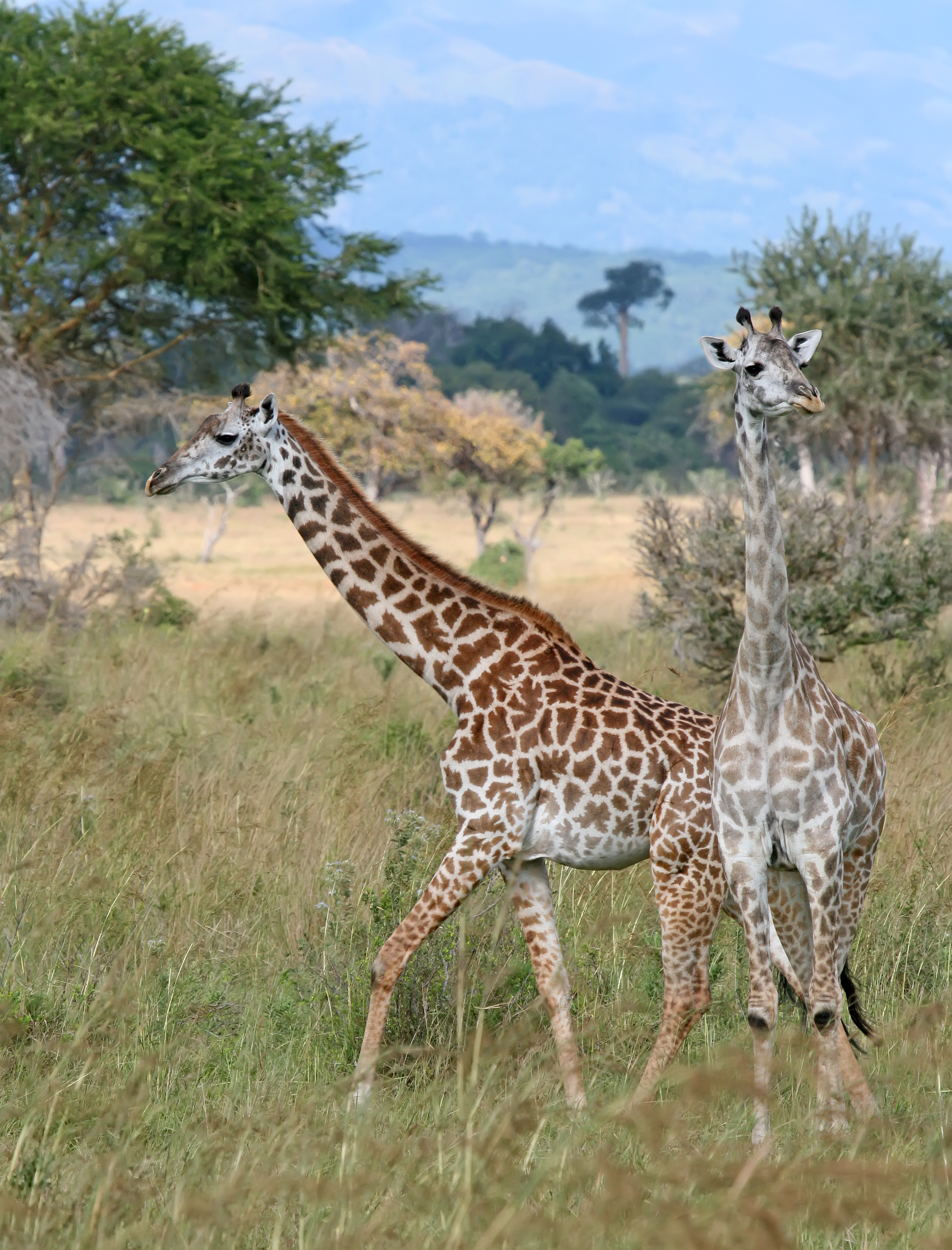
Two giraffes

The giraffe stands 5–6 m (16–20 ft) tall, with males taller than females. The giraffe and the okapi have characteristic long necks and long legs. Ossicones are present on males and females in the giraffe, but only on males in the okapi.

Giraffids share many common features with other ruminants. They have cloven hooves and cannon bones, much like bovids, and a complex, four-chambered stomach. They have no upper incisors or upper canines, replacing them with a tough, horny pad. An especially long diastema is seen between the front and cheek teeth. The latter are selenodont, adapted for grinding up tough plant matter. Like most other ruminants, the dental formula for giraffids is 0.0.3.33.1.3.3. Giraffids have prehensile tongues (specially adapted for grasping).

The extant giraffids, the forest-dwelling okapi and the savannah-living giraffe, have several features in common, including a pair of skin-covered horns, called ossicones, up to 15 cm (5.9 in) long (absent in female okapis); a long, black, prehensile tongue; lobed canine teeth; patterned coats acting as camouflage; and a back sloping towards the rear. The okapi's neck is long compared to most ruminants, but not nearly so long as the giraffe's. Male giraffes are the tallest of all mammals: their horns reach 5.5 m (18 ft) above the ground and their shoulder 3.3 m (11 ft), whereas the okapi has a shoulder height of 1.7 m (5 ft 7 in).

== Distribution ==
The two extant genera are now confined to sub-Saharan Africa. The okapi is restricted to a small range in the northern rainforest of the Democratic Republic of Congo. Although the range of the giraffe is considerably larger, it once covered an area twice the present size – all parts of Africa that could offer an arid and dry landscape furnished with trees.

== Behavior ==
The social structure and behavior is markedly different in okapis and giraffes. Although little is known of okapi behavior in the wild, some features have been observed in both species:

- They have an ambling gait similar to camels, with their weight supported alternately by their left and right legs, while their necks maintain balance. Giraffes can run up to 60 km/h (37 mph) this way and are documented to have covered 1,500 km (930 mi) in the Sahel during the dry season.
- The dominance hierarchy, which has been well-documented among giraffes, has also been seen among captive okapis. An adult giraffe head can weigh 30 kg (66 lb), and if necessary, male giraffes establish a hierarchy among themselves by swinging their heads at each other, horns first, a behavior known as "necking". A subordinate okapi signals submission by placing its head and neck on the ground.
- Giraffes are sociable, whereas okapis live mainly solitary lives. Giraffes temporarily form herds of up to 20 individuals; these herds can be mixed or uniform groups of males and females, young and adults. Okapis are normally seen in mother-offspring pairs, although they occasionally gather around a prime food source. Giraffes are not territorial, but have ranges that can dramatically vary between – 5 and 654 km^{2} (1.9 and 252.5 sq mi) – depending on food availability, whereas okapis have individual ranges about 2.5–5 km^{2} (0.97–1.93 sq mi) in size.
- Giraffes and okapis are normally silent, but both have a range of vocalizations, including coughing, snorting, moaning, hissing, and whistling. Giraffes have been suggested to be able to communicate using infrasonic sounds, like elephants and blue whales.
