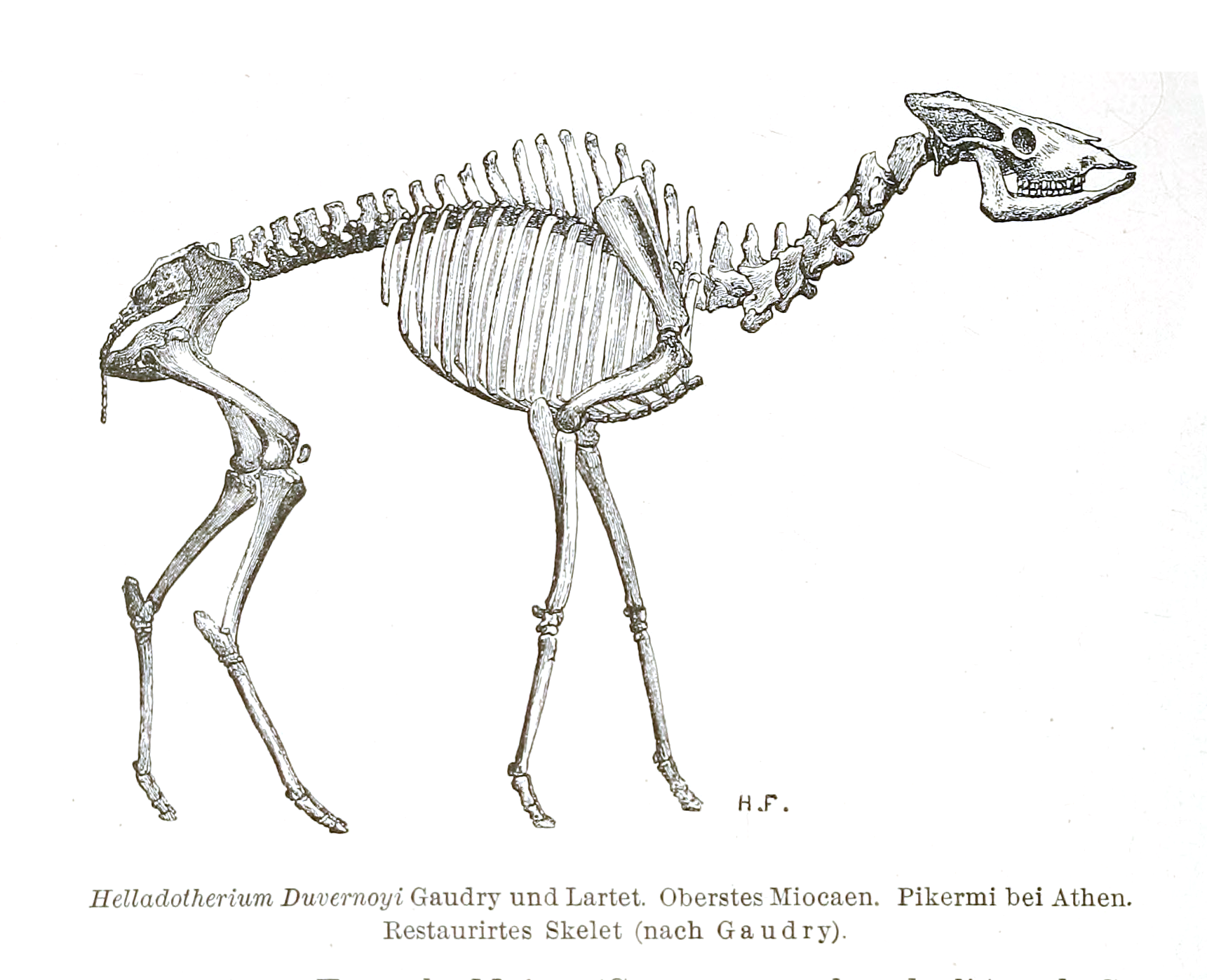
- Skeleton of Helladotherium duvernoyi

Scientific classification
- Kingdom: Animalia
- Phylum: Chordata
- Class: Mammalia
- Infraclass: Placentalia
- Order: Artiodactyla
- Family: Giraffidae
- Genus: †Helladotherium

Species
- †Helladotherium duvernoyi; †Helladotherium grande

= Helladotherium =

Helladotherium Temporal range: Miocene

Extinct genus of mammals

Helladotherium is an extinct genus of sivatheriine giraffid which inhabited Europe, Africa, and Asia during the Miocene. The most complete skeleton is that of a female, based on a comparison with an intact female Sivatherium giganteum skull.

Only two species of Helladotherium have been discovered, with H. grande being larger than H. duvernoyi. The former has been found only in Pakistan.

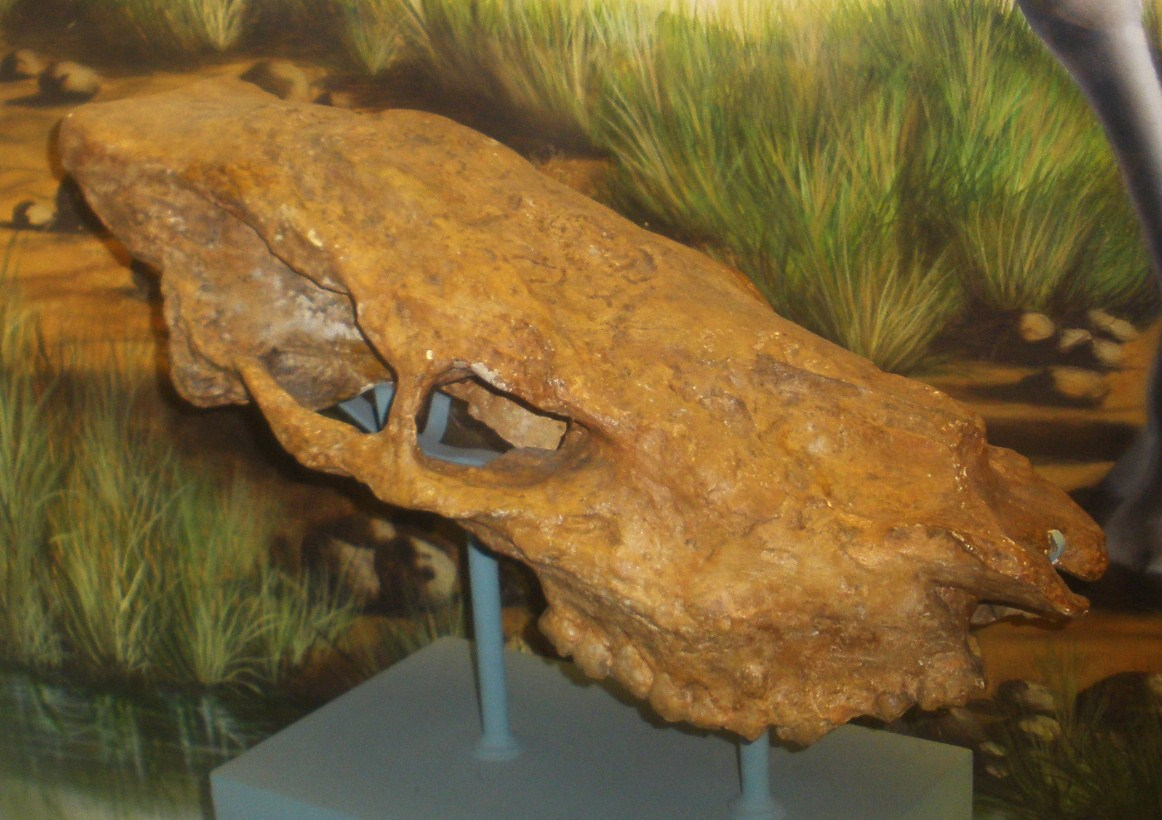
Skull

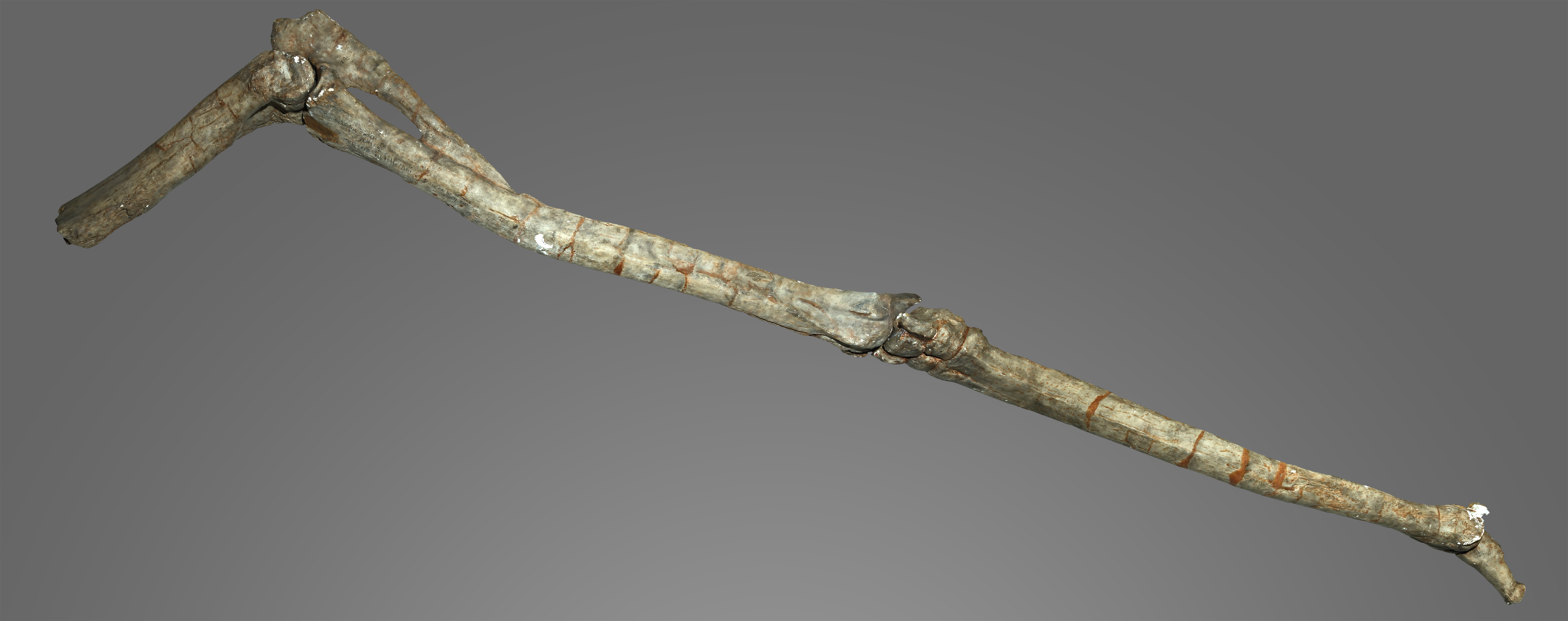
Forelimb, Pikermi Former collection Gaudry

== Palaeoecology ==
The dental microwear patterns of H. duvernoyi evidence that this species was folivorous and a browser.

== Taxonomy ==
In 2025, Kostantis Laskos and colleagues described two ossicones of the giraffid Bramatherium perimense from the Fourka locality of the Greek Chalkidiki Peninsula, close to localities which have yielded Helladotherium. They concluded that Helladotherium should be synonymized with Bramatherium based on their overlapping distribution, nearly identical anatomy, and presumed occupation of comparable ecological niches. This synonymy had similarly been suspected by previous researchers. Laskos and colleagues suggested that the lack of ossicones found for Helladotherium had prevented previous phylogenetic analyses from recovering their close relationship. Furthermore, these researchers only recognized two valid and distinct species of Bramatherium, the larger B. grande and the smaller B. perimense, with characters previously thought to be distinctive between all other species simply due to intraspecific variation.

== Sources ==
- The Evolution of Artiodactyls by Donald R. Prothero and Scott E. Foss
- Mammoths, Sabertooths, and Hominids by Jordi Agusti and Mauricio Anton
- Classification of Mammals by Malcolm C. McKenna and Susan K. Bell

== See also ==
- Sivatherium
- Giraffokeryx
- Palaeotragus
