= Indratherium =

Scientific classification
- Kingdom: Animalia
- Phylum: Chordata
- Class: Mammalia
- Order: Artiodactyla
- Family: Giraffidae
- Genus: †Indratherium; Pilgrim, 1910

Type species
- Indratherium majori Pilgrim, 1910

Other species
- Indratherium majori Pilgrim, 1910; Indratherium compressus Khan & Sarwar, 2002

Extinct genus of mammals

Indratherium is an extinct genus of giraffid that lived during Pleistocene of Sivalik Hills. The type species is Indratherium majori that was described by Pilgrim on the basis of fossils collected from Markanda river of northern India, the second species Indratherium compressus was described on the basis of fossils collected from Sardhok in Pakistan.
