= Giraffa stillei =

Giraffa stillei Temporal range: Pliocene to Pleistocene

Scientific classification
- Domain: Eukaryota
- Kingdom: Animalia
- Phylum: Chordata
- Class: Mammalia
- Order: Artiodactyla
- Family: Giraffidae
- Genus: Giraffa
- Species: G. stillei

Binomial name
- Giraffa stillei Arambourg, 1947

Extinct species of giraffe

Giraffa stillei is an extinct species of giraffe endemic to Africa during the Pliocene to Pleistocene epochs. It had a range from Malawi to Central Africa.
