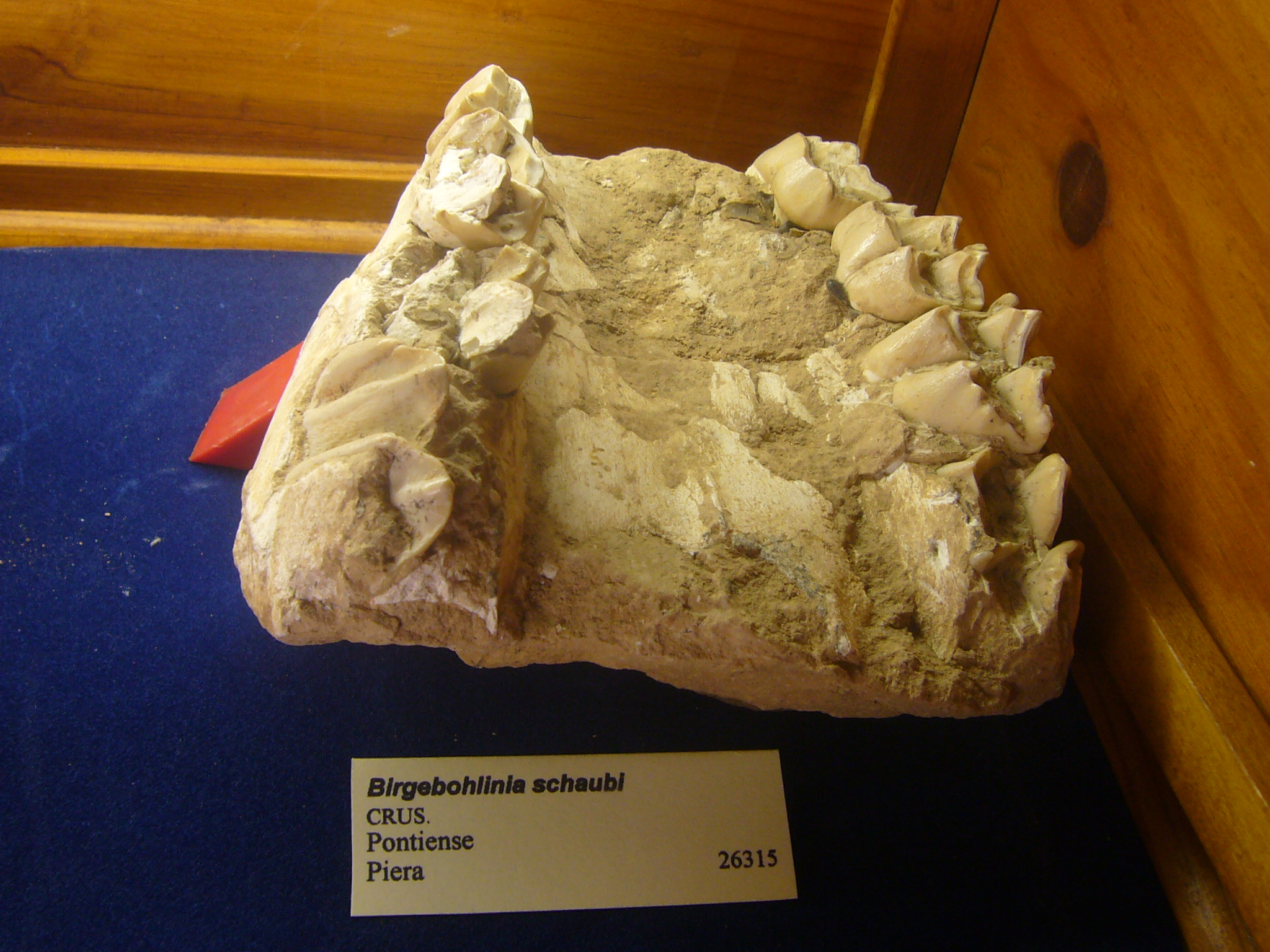
- Birgerbohlinia schaubi

Scientific classification
- Kingdom: Animalia
- Phylum: Chordata
- Class: Mammalia
- Order: Artiodactyla
- Family: Giraffidae
- Genus: †Birgerbohlinia; Crusafont Pairó & Villalta, 1951
- Species: †B. schaubi

Binomial name
- †Birgerbohlinia schaubi Crusafont Pairó & Villalta, 1951

= Birgerbohlinia =

Birgerbohlinia Temporal range: Turolian, Miocene

Extinct genus of mammals

Birgerbohlinia is an extinct genus of Giraffidae. It was first named by Crusafont Pairó and Villalta in 1951 and was found in Crevillente-2 (Alicante, Spain).
