= Vishnutherium =

Scientific classification
- Kingdom: Animalia
- Phylum: Chordata
- Class: Mammalia
- Infraclass: Placentalia
- Order: Artiodactyla
- Family: Giraffidae
- Genus: †Vishnutherium; Lydekker, 1876

Type species
- †Vishnutherium iravadicum Lydekker, 1876

Other species
- †V. priscillum (Matthew, 1929)

Synonyms
- Giraffa priscilla Matthew, 1929

Extinct genus of mammals

Vishnutherium (Vishnu's beast) is an extinct genus of the Giraffidae during the Miocene epoch. The genus contains two species, the type V. iravadicum from Irrawady, Myanmar and second species V. priscillum from Iran, India and Pakistan.
