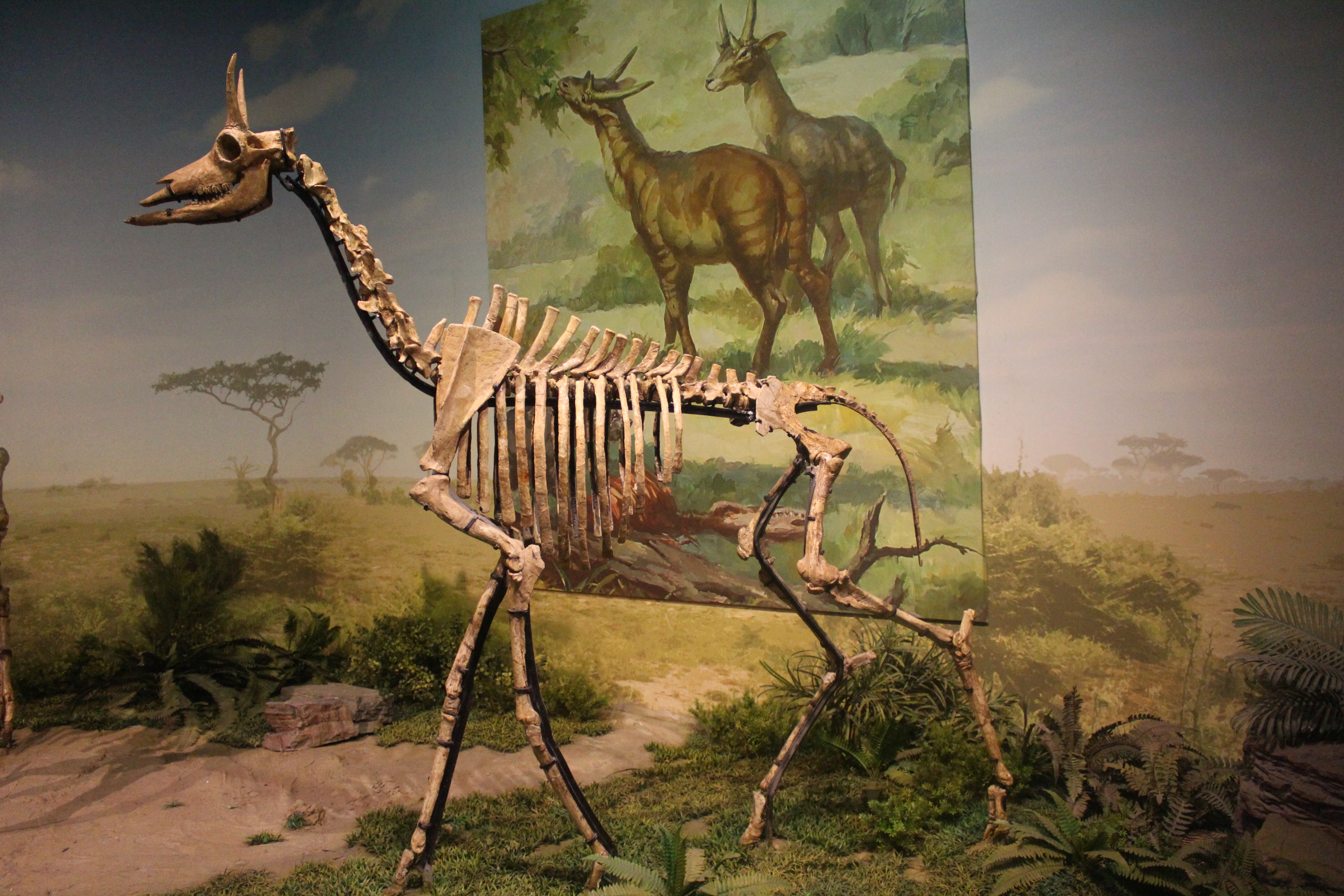
- Skeletal mount, Tianjin Natural History Museum
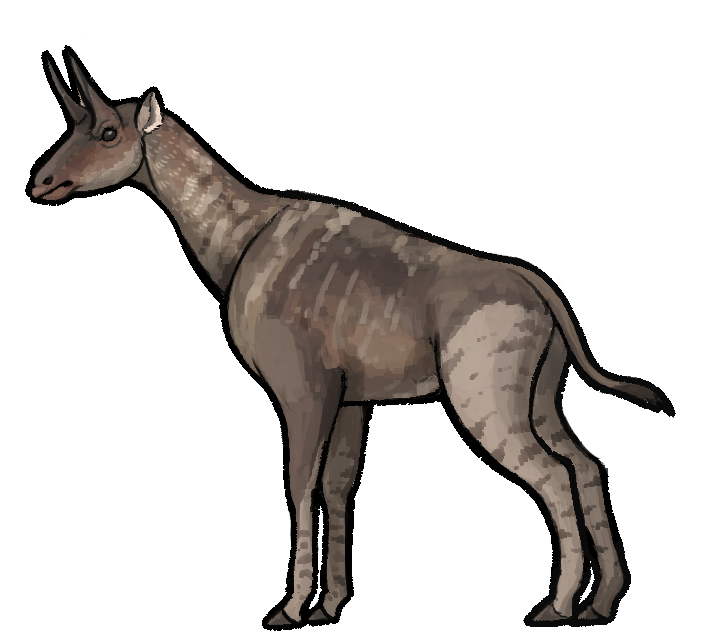
- Restoration of Palaeotragus inexspectatus

Scientific classification
- Kingdom: Animalia
- Phylum: Chordata
- Class: Mammalia
- Order: Artiodactyla
- Family: Giraffidae
- Genus: †Palaeotragus

Type species
- †Palaeotragus rouenii Gaudry, 1861

Species
- †P. berislavicus; †P. coelophrys; †Palaeotragus germaini; †P. inexspectatus (Samson & Radulesco, 1966); †P. microdon; †Palaeotragus? primaevus

= Palaeotragus =

Palaeotragus Temporal range: Miocene–Early Pleistocene

Extinct genus of mammals

Palaeotragus ("ancient goat") is a genus of very large, primitive, okapi-like giraffids from the Miocene to Early Pleistocene of Africa and Eurasia.

Palaeotragus primaevus is the older species, being found in early to mid-Miocene strata, while P. germaini is found in Late Miocene strata. P. primaevus is distinguished from P. germaini by the lack of ossicones. It was also the smaller species, being a little under 2 m (6 ft 7 in) at the shoulders. P. germaini had a pair of ossicones, and in life, it would have resembled either a short-necked, 3 m (9.8 ft) tall giraffe, or a gargantuan okapi.

Palaeotragus inexspectatus from the Early Pleistocene of Greece represents the youngest giraffid in Europe.

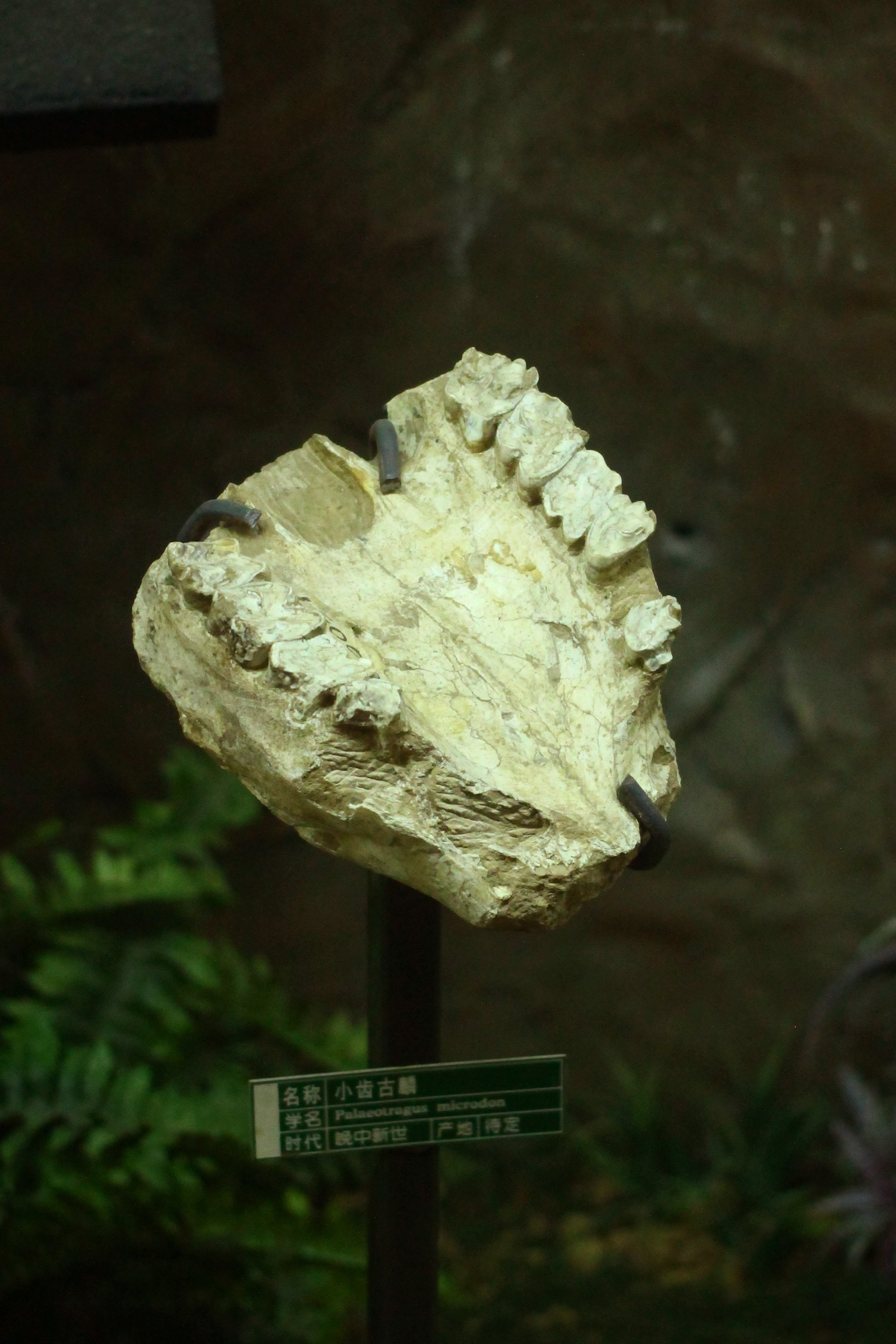
P. microdon fossil
