= Harry Scott Thornicroft =

Rhodesian civil servant

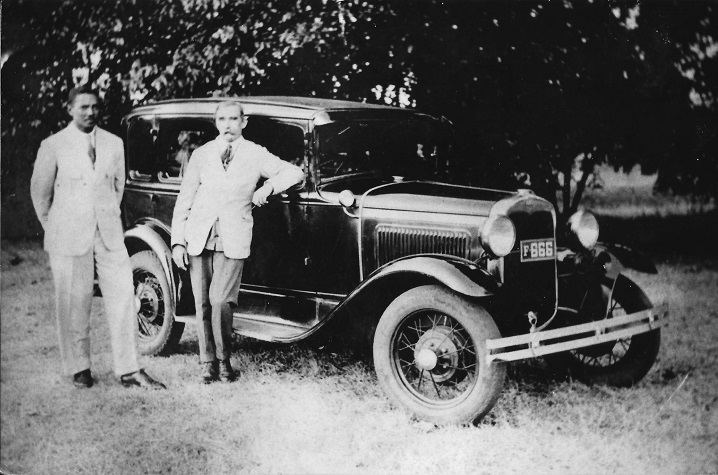
Harry Scott Thornicroft (on the right)

Henry Scott Thornicroft, nicknamed "Dongolosi"(16 January 1868 – 19 March 1944) was a British Native Commissioner in Petauke, in North-Western Rhodesia and later Northern Rhodesia (now Zambia) for 17 years and later a Justice of the Peace in Fort Jameson (now Chipata).

Thornicroft was born in St Pancras, London, the son of coal merchant Thomas Thornicroft and his wife, Matilda. In Rhodesia, Harry Thornicroft married a local woman and had 11 children, including Gaston Thornicroft, later a leader of the coloured community. Thornicroft's Giraffe, a subspecies of giraffe endemic to the Luangwa Valley, is named after him, from a specimen which he had shot and sent to the Natural History Museum, London, where it was displayed.

He died in Northern Rhodesia.
