= Gaston Thornicroft =

Gaston Thomas Thornicroft was a leader of the Coloured (mixed-race) community in Southern Rhodesia from the 1930s to the 1960s. His father was Harry Scott Thornicroft, a British colonial administrator, who married a native African woman. Gaston was president of two groups advocating rights for Coloureds: the Coloured Community Service League from 1933, and the Rhodesia National Association from 1952 until it was eclipsed in the early 1960s by more radical black unity groups. He led talks to unite competing Coloured representative associations. Initially, he emphasised the Coloured community's separateness from and superiority to black Africans, but later he was sympathetic to the non-white unity movement, without ever formally joining it. He was a businessman, running 18 stores by 1945. In the 1953 general election in the Federation of Rhodesia and Nyasaland, one seat was reserved for a European representing African interests; Thornicroft applied to stand but was refused as not being European. He represented "Coloured & Eurafrican Communities" at the 1961 Southern Rhodesia constitutional talks. He ran unsuccessfully in the 1962 and 1970 general elections in (Southern) Rhodesia.
