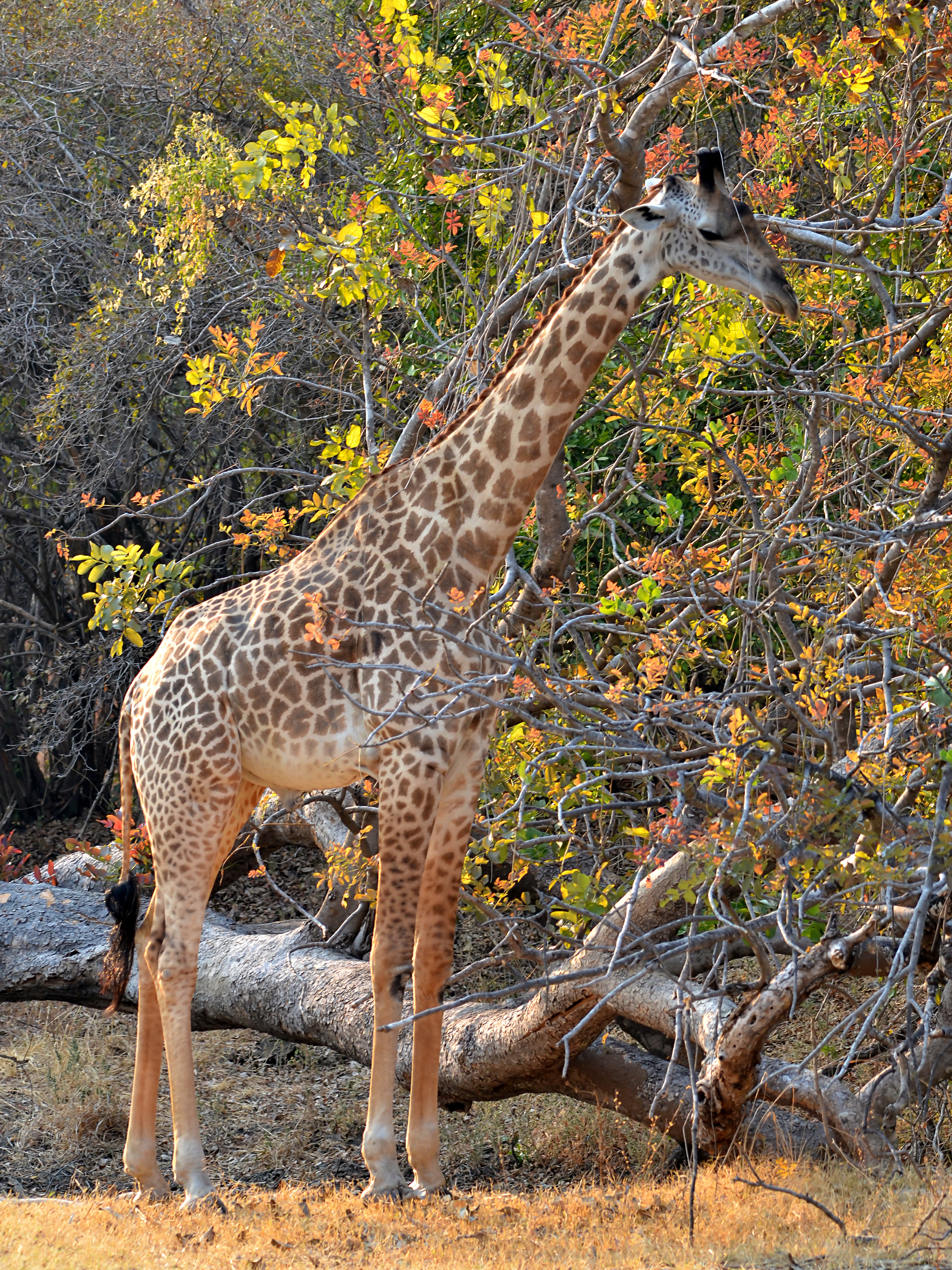
- Thornicroft's giraffe in Mfuwe, Zambia

Conservation status
- Vulnerable (IUCN 3.1)

Scientific classification
- Kingdom: Animalia
- Phylum: Chordata
- Class: Mammalia
- Order: Artiodactyla
- Family: Giraffidae
- Genus: Giraffa
- Species: G. camelopardalis
- Subspecies: G. c. thornicrofti

Trinomial name
- Giraffa camelopardalis thornicrofti Lydekker, 1911
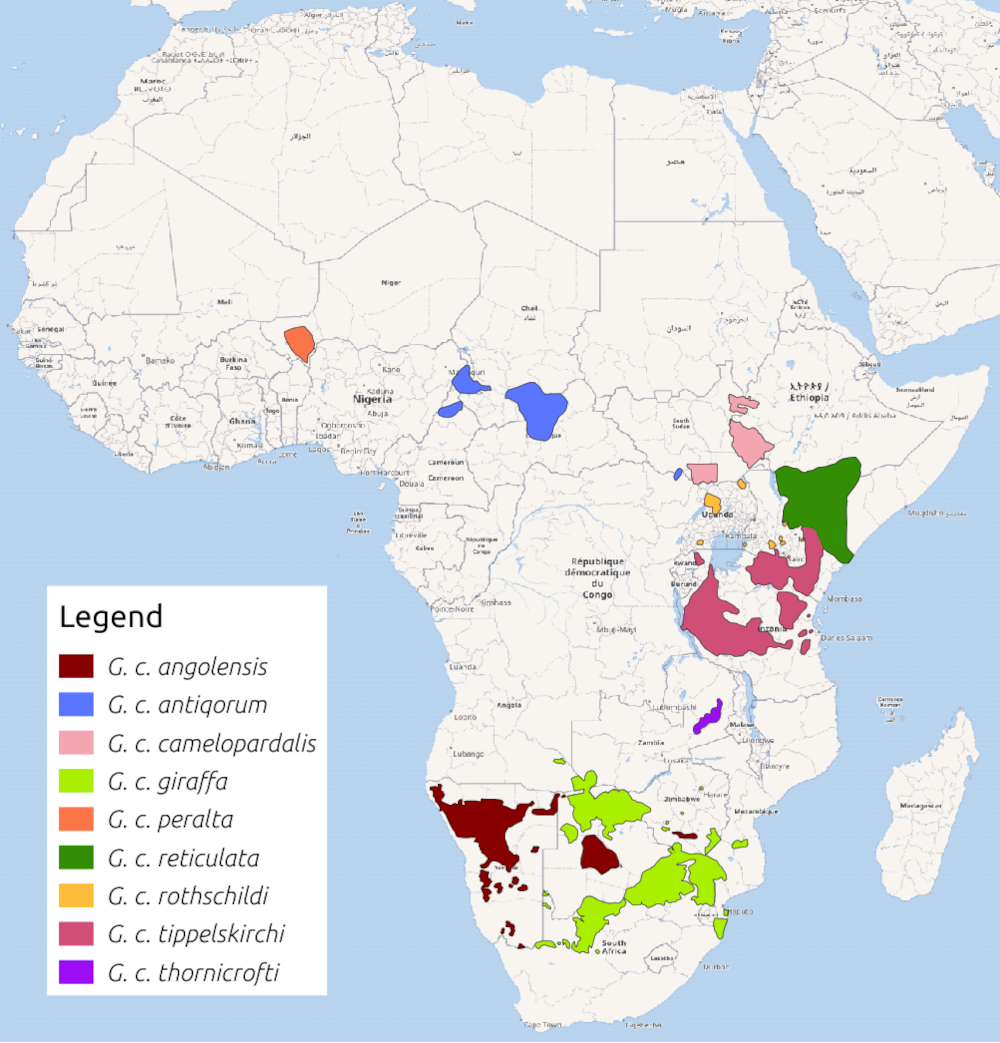
- Range in purple

Synonyms
- G. thornicrofti G. tippelskirchi thornicrofti

= Thornicroft's giraffe =

Subspecies of giraffe

Thornicroft's giraffe (Giraffa camelopardalis thornicrofti), also known as the Rhodesian giraffe or Luangwa giraffe, is a subspecies of giraffe. It is sometimes considered a species in its own right (as Giraffa thornicrofti) or a subspecies of the Masai giraffe (as Giraffa tippelskirchi thornicrofti). It is geographically isolated, occurring only in Zambia's South Luangwa Valley. An estimated 550 live in the wild, with no captive populations. Its lifespan is 22 years for males and 28 years for females. The ecotype was originally named after Harry Scott Thornicroft, a commissioner in what was then North-Eastern Rhodesia and later Northern Rhodesia.

== Description ==
Thornicroft's giraffes are tall with very long necks. They have long, dark tongues and skin-colored horns. Giraffes have a typical coat pattern, with regional differences among subspecies. The pattern consists of large, irregular shaped brown to black patches separated by white to yellow bands. Male giraffes' coats darken with age, particularly the patches. The darkening of the coat has not been studied extensively enough to indicate absolute age; however, it can estimate relative age of male Thornicroft's giraffes.

== Range, distribution and habitat ==
Giraffes occur in arid and dry-savannah zones in sub-Saharan Africa, provided trees are available as a food source. Thornicroft's giraffe is endemic to Zambia. Giraffes are herd animals with a flexible social system.

== Diet ==
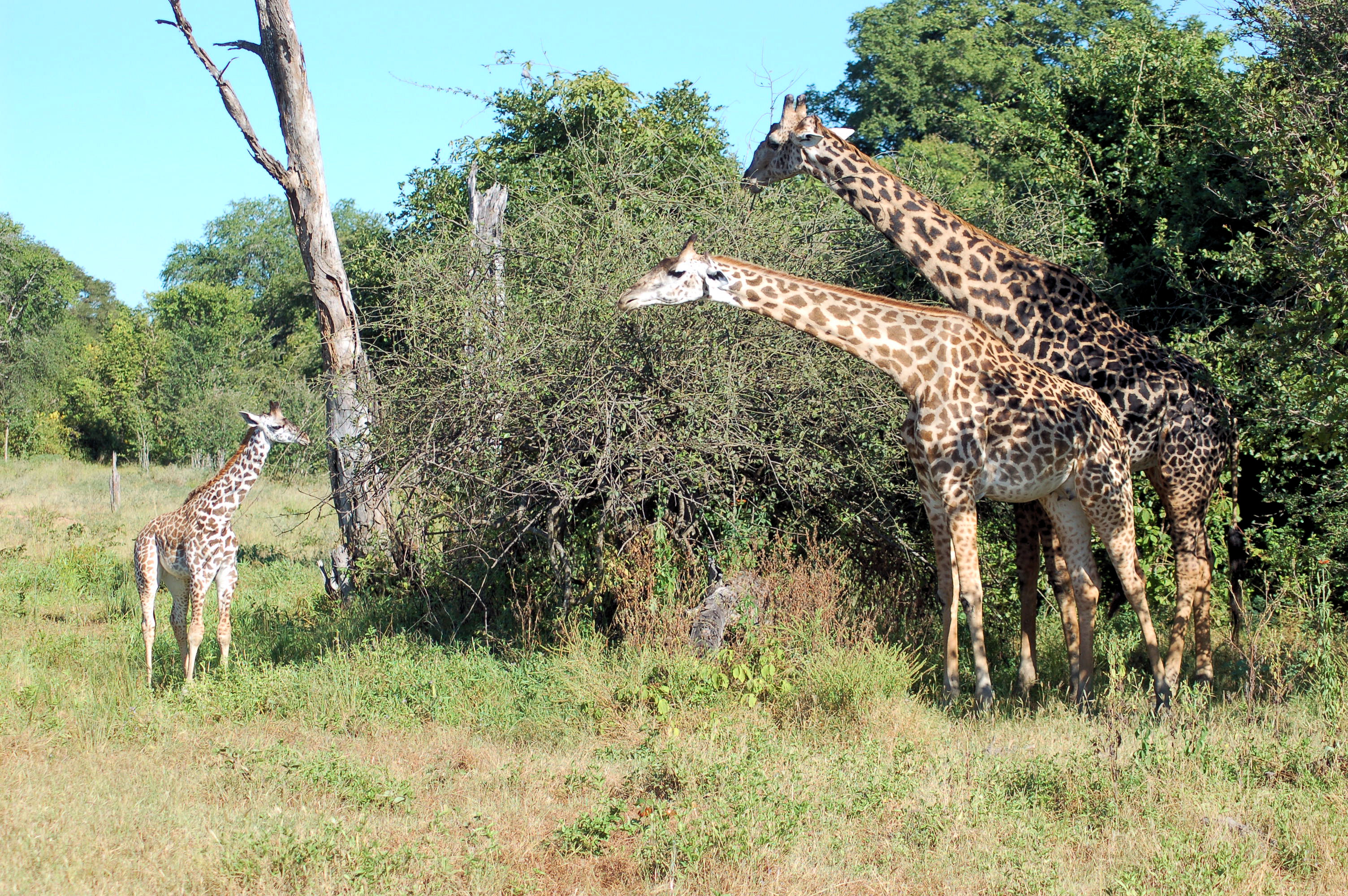
A Thornicroft's giraffe family browsing at the South Luangwa National Park, Zambia

Giraffes are exclusively browsers that primarily feed on leaves and shoots of trees and shrubs. They consume deciduous plants in the wet season and transition to evergreen and semi-evergreen species in the dry season, choosing flowers, fruits, and pods when they are available. They are true ruminants with forestomach fermentation. Their food intake is approximately 2.1% of the body mass of females and 1.6% for males. They can obtain their water through the foliage they consume, but drink regularly when water is available. Giraffes seek out acacia species when browsing. Their feeding stimulates shoot production of the species.

== Reproduction ==
Thornicroft's giraffes breed throughout the year. They reach sexual maturity at approximately six years, and then produce offspring approximately every 677 days. About half of all calves die before one year of age, mostly due to predation. Giraffes can become pregnant while lactating, an unusual characteristic.

== Conservation ==
Giraffa camelopardalis thornicrofti is endemic to Zambia with a population of less than 550. There are none in captivity. Ecotourism has played a vital role in conservation of all subspecies of giraffes, due to their popularity with tourists. Giraffes as a species are classified as vulnerable according to the IUCN, but their populations are rapidly declining, with some subspecies being listed as critically endangered Their primary threats are poaching, human population growth, habitat loss, habitat fragmentation, and habitat degradation.
