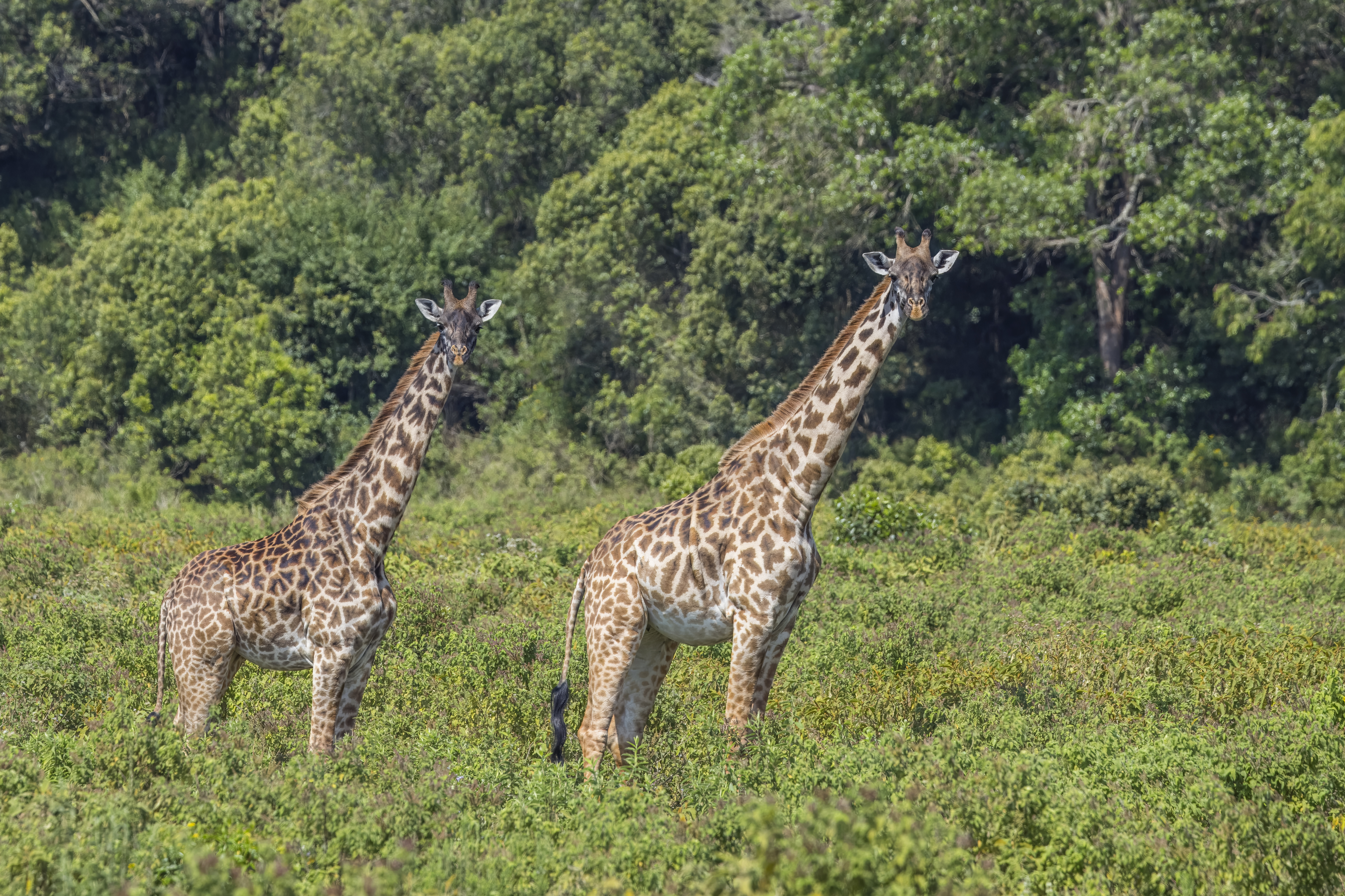
- Arusha National Park, Tanzania
- Singing

Conservation status
- Endangered (IUCN 3.1)

Scientific classification
- Kingdom: Animalia
- Phylum: Chordata
- Class: Mammalia
- Order: Artiodactyla
- Family: Giraffidae
- Genus: Giraffa
- Species: G. tippelskirchi

Binomial name
- Giraffa tippelskirchi (Matschie, 1898)
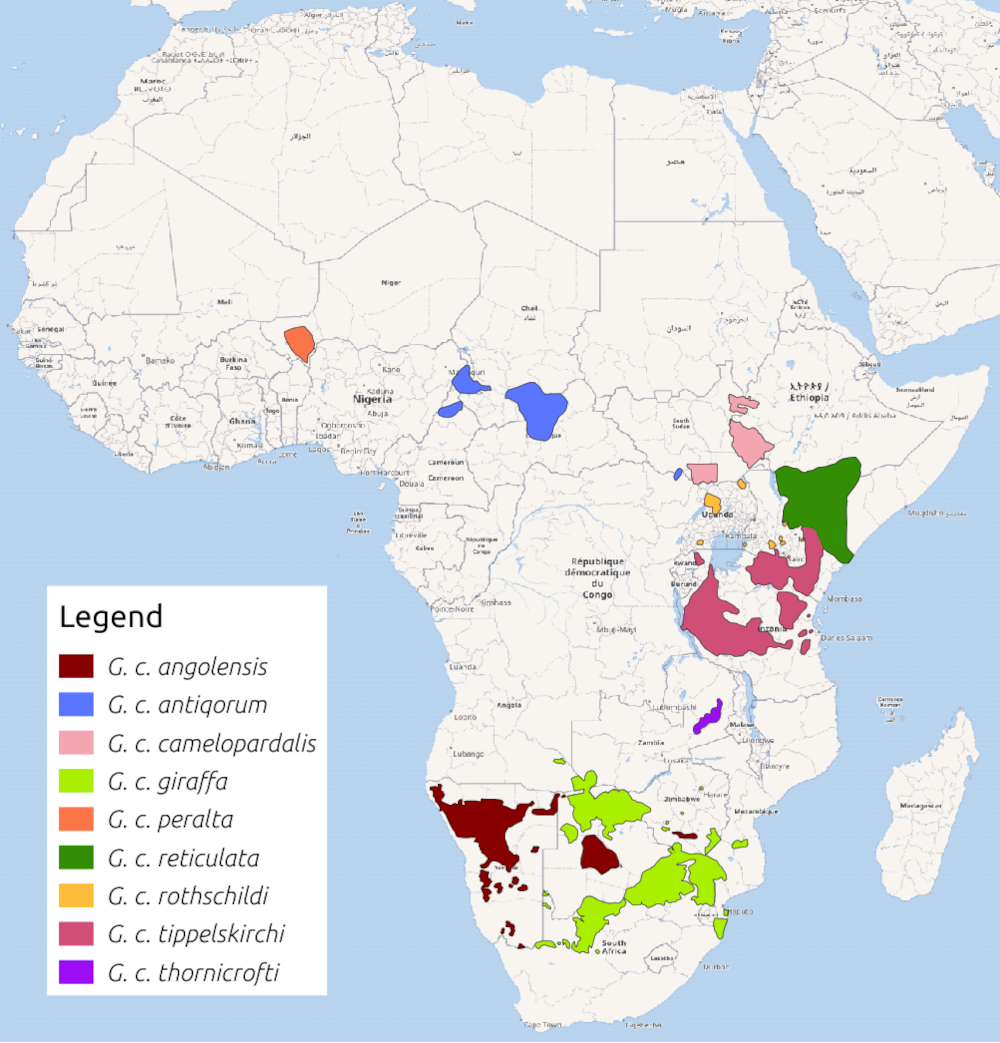
- Range in dark pink

Synonyms
- Giraffa camelopardalis tippelskirchi

= Masai giraffe =

Species of giraffe

The Masai giraffe (Giraffa tippelskirchi), also spelled Maasai giraffe, and sometimes called the Kilimanjaro giraffe, is a species of giraffe native to East Africa. The Masai giraffe can be found in central and southern Kenya, Tanzania, Uganda, and the Luangwa Valley region of Zambia. It has distinctive jagged, irregular leaf-like blotches that extend from the hooves to its head. The Masai giraffe is currently the national animal of Tanzania.

== Taxonomy ==
Genetic research on giraffes in 2016 determined that there are likely four separate species of giraffe rather than just one. The IUCN's Giraffe and Okapi Specialist Group has now accepted that there are four species of giraffes: the Masai giraffe, the reticulated giraffe, the northern giraffe, and the southern giraffe.^{[3]} The Masai giraffe has therefore been elevated to a full species, the research also established that the Thornicroft's giraffe also known as the Luangwa giraffe, found in the Luangwa Valley region of Zambia, is a subspecies of the Masai giraffe (Giraffa tippelskirchi thornicrofti).

The Masai giraffe was described and given the binomial name Giraffa tippelskirchi by German zoologist Paul Matschie in 1898, however, since 1758 giraffes had generally always been regarded as a single species, so the Masai giraffe was considered a subspecies of the giraffe, Giraffa camelopardalis tippelskirchi. The Masai giraffe was named in honor of Herr von Tippelskirch, who was a member of a German scientific expedition in German East Africa to what is now northern Tanzania in 1896. Tippelskirch brought back the skin of a female Masai giraffe from near Lake Eyasi which was later on identified as Giraffa tippelskirchi.

== Description ==
The Masai giraffe is distinguished by jagged and irregular spots on its body. Its geographic range includes various parts of eastern Africa. It is the largest-bodied giraffe species, making it the tallest land animal on Earth. Bulls are generally larger and heavier than cows, weighing close to 1.3 tonnes (1.4 short tons) and growing up to 5.8 m (19 ft) in height. In the wild, individuals can live to be around 30 years of age, and in most cases can live longer in captivity. The Masai giraffe's most famous feature, its neck, contains seven vertebrae and makes up roughly one third of its body height. Its long and muscular tongue, which can be up to 50 centimetres (20 inches) in length, is prehensile and allows it to grab leaves from tall trees that are inaccessible to other animals. The tongue's darker pigment is believed to function as a natural sunscreen and prevent sunburn. On top of the head are two bony structures called ossicones which are covered by thick skin and have dark hair on the tips. These can be used during fights to club its opponent. Bulls usually have an extra ossicone present between the eyes. When galloping, the Masai giraffe has been recorded to reach speeds of almost 64 kilometers per hour (40 miles per hour).

== Conservation ==
Masai giraffes are considered endangered by the IUCN, and the Masai giraffe population declined 52% in recent decades due to poaching and habitat loss. The population amounts to 32,550 in the wild. Demographic studies of wild giraffes living inside and outside protected areas suggest low adult survival outside protected areas due to poaching and low calf survival inside protected areas due to predation; these are the primary influences on population growth rates. Survival of giraffe calves is influenced by the season of birth and the seasonal local presence or absence of long-distance migratory herds of wildebeest and zebra. Metapopulation analysis indicated protected areas were important for keeping giraffes in the larger landscape.

In situ conservation of Masai giraffes is being done by several government agencies, including the Kenya Wildlife Service, Tanzania National Parks, Zambia Wildlife Authority; and non-governmental organizations including PAMS Foundation and the Wild Nature Institute. Community-based wildlife conservation areas have also been shown to be effective at protecting giraffes.

Over 100 Masai giraffe live under human care in AZA accredited zoos in the United States. At several zoos, Masai Giraffe cows have become pregnant and successfully given birth.

Masai giraffes can suffer from giraffe skin disease, which is a disorder of unknown etiology that causes lesions on the forelimbs. This disorder is being further investigated to better understand mortality in this species.

== Gallery ==
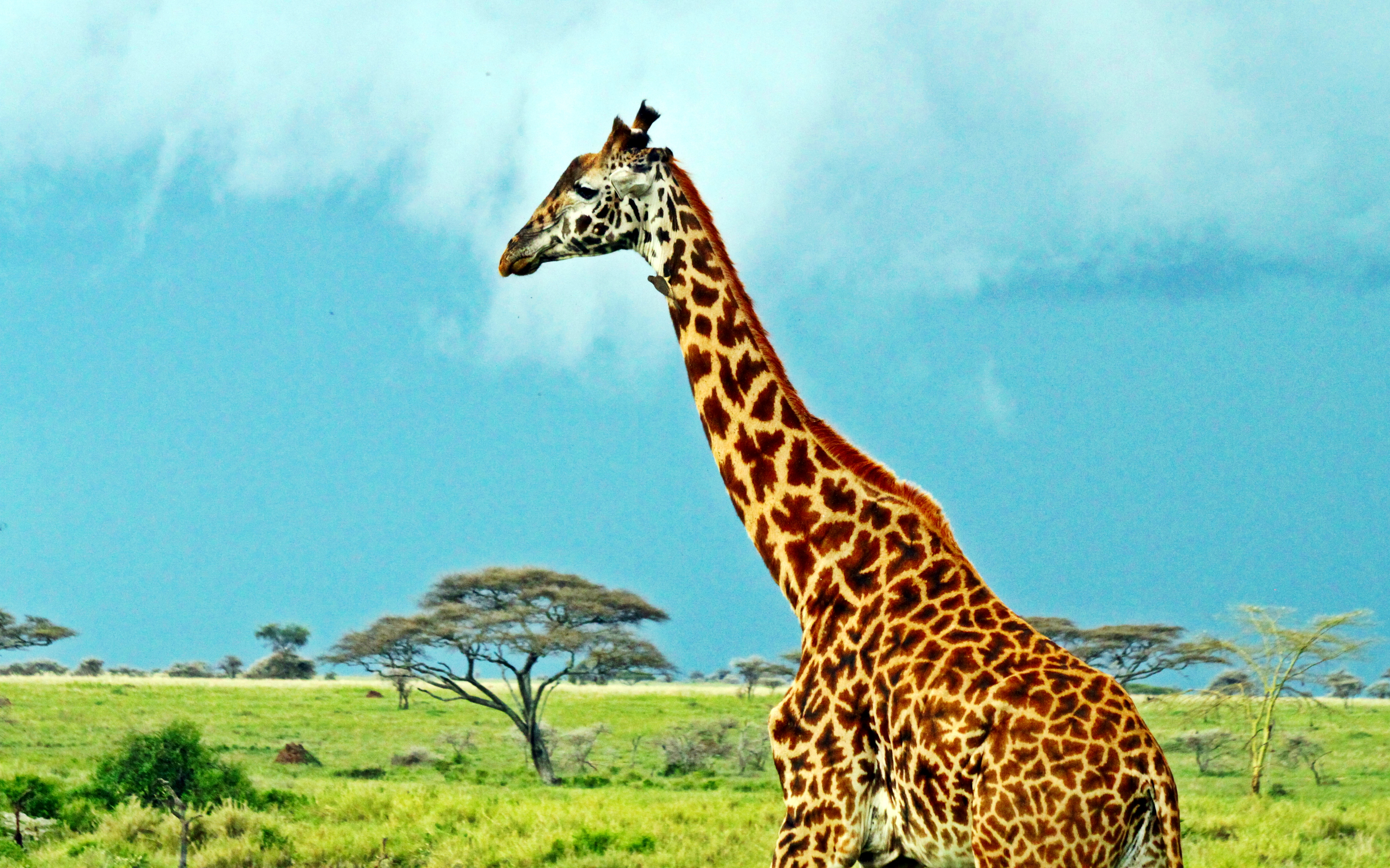
Masai giraffe in Serengeti National Park, Tanzania

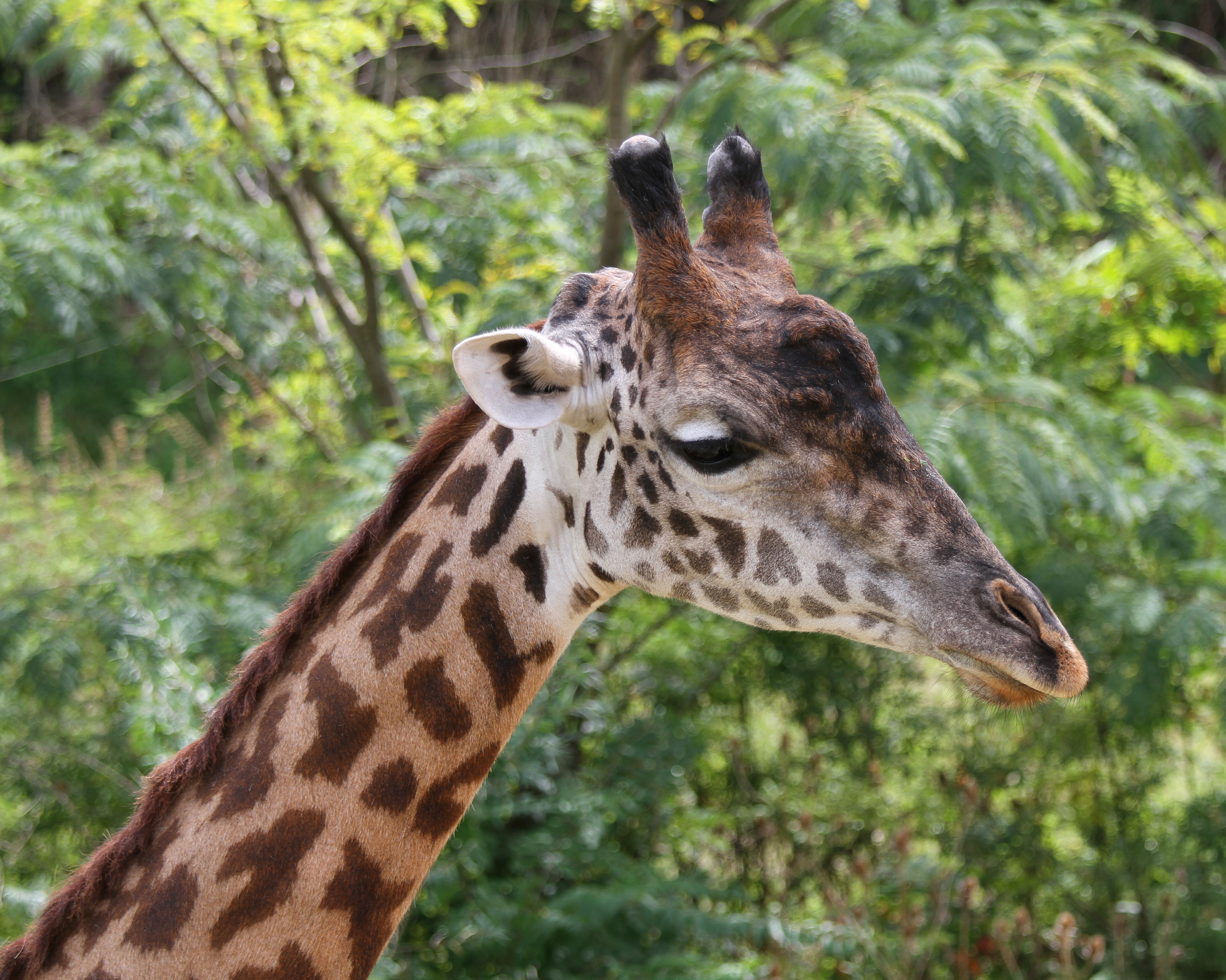
Detail of head, taken at Cincinnati Zoo and Botanical Garden

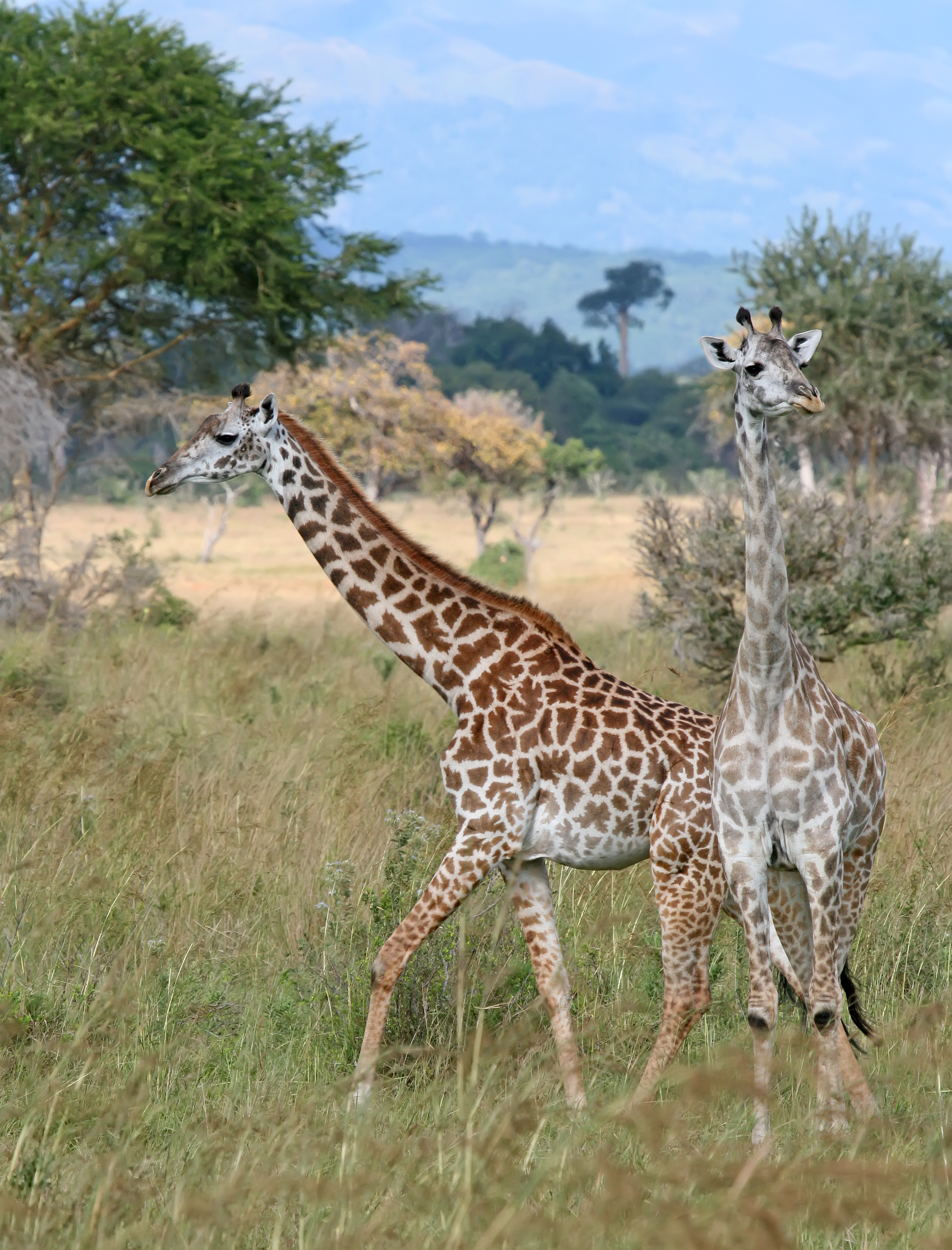
Two Masai giraffes in Mikumi National Park

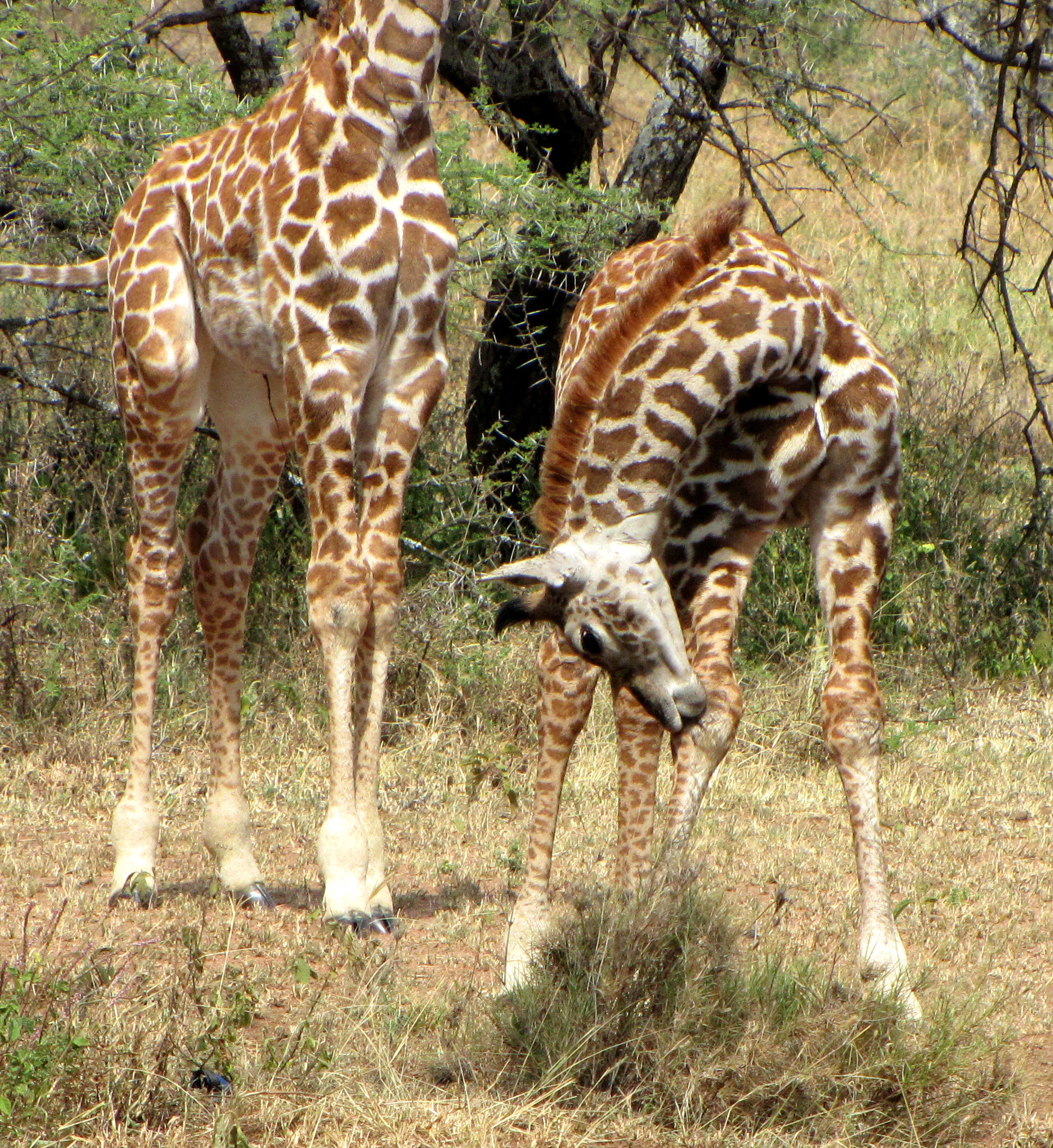
Two week-old Masai giraffes in Serengeti, Tanzania

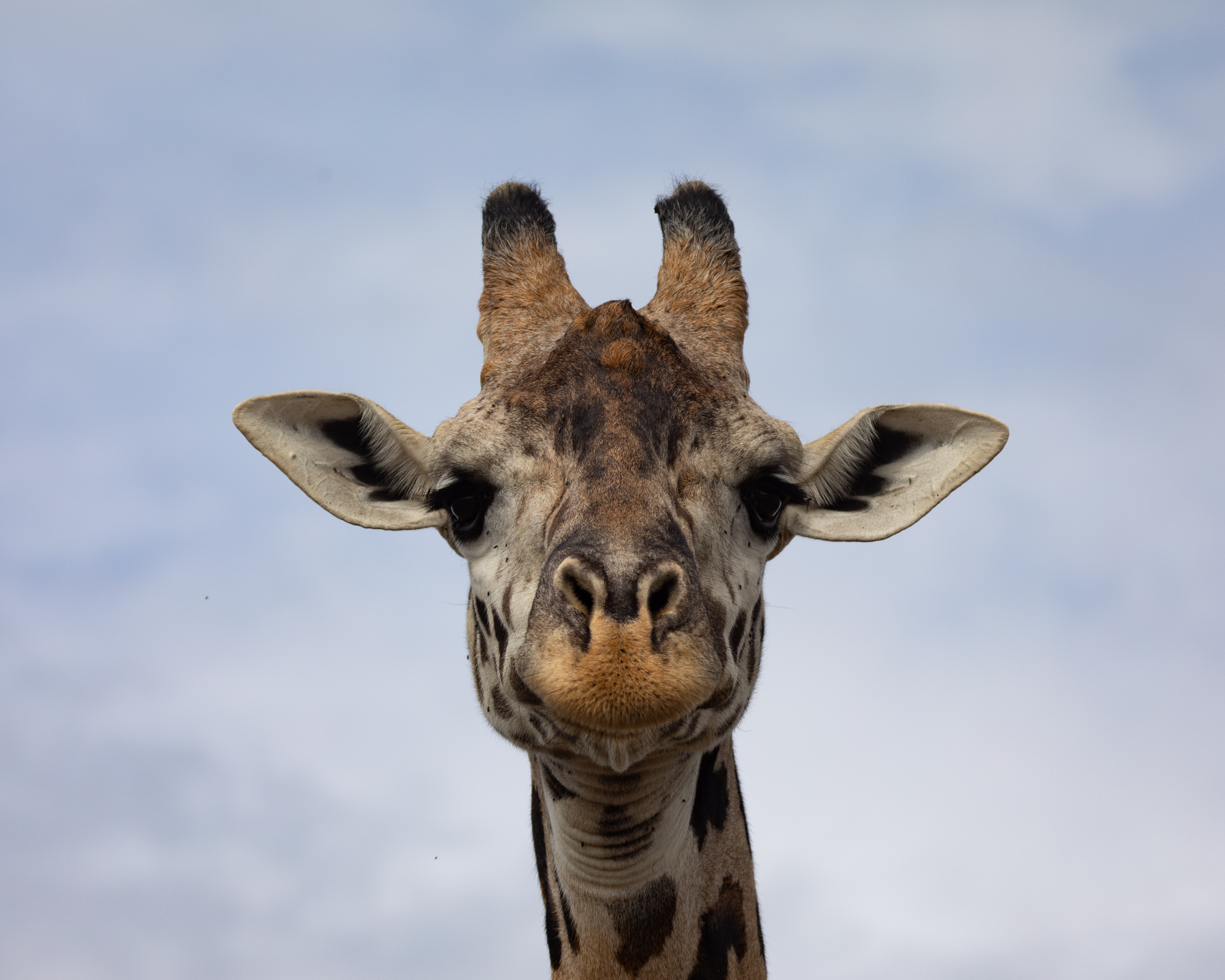
Close up of giraffe face in Masai Mara

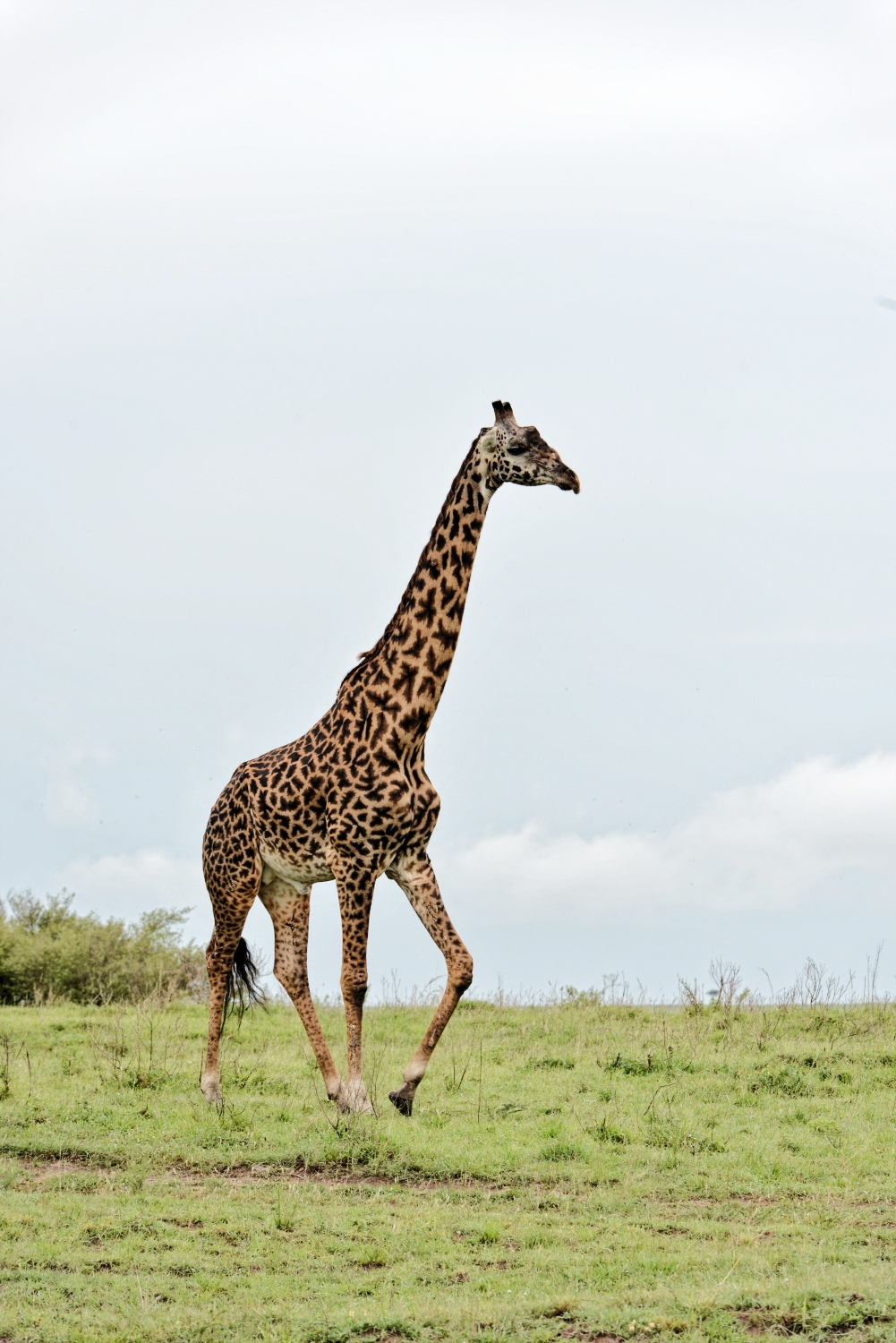
Maasai giraffe in the plain of Maasai Mara

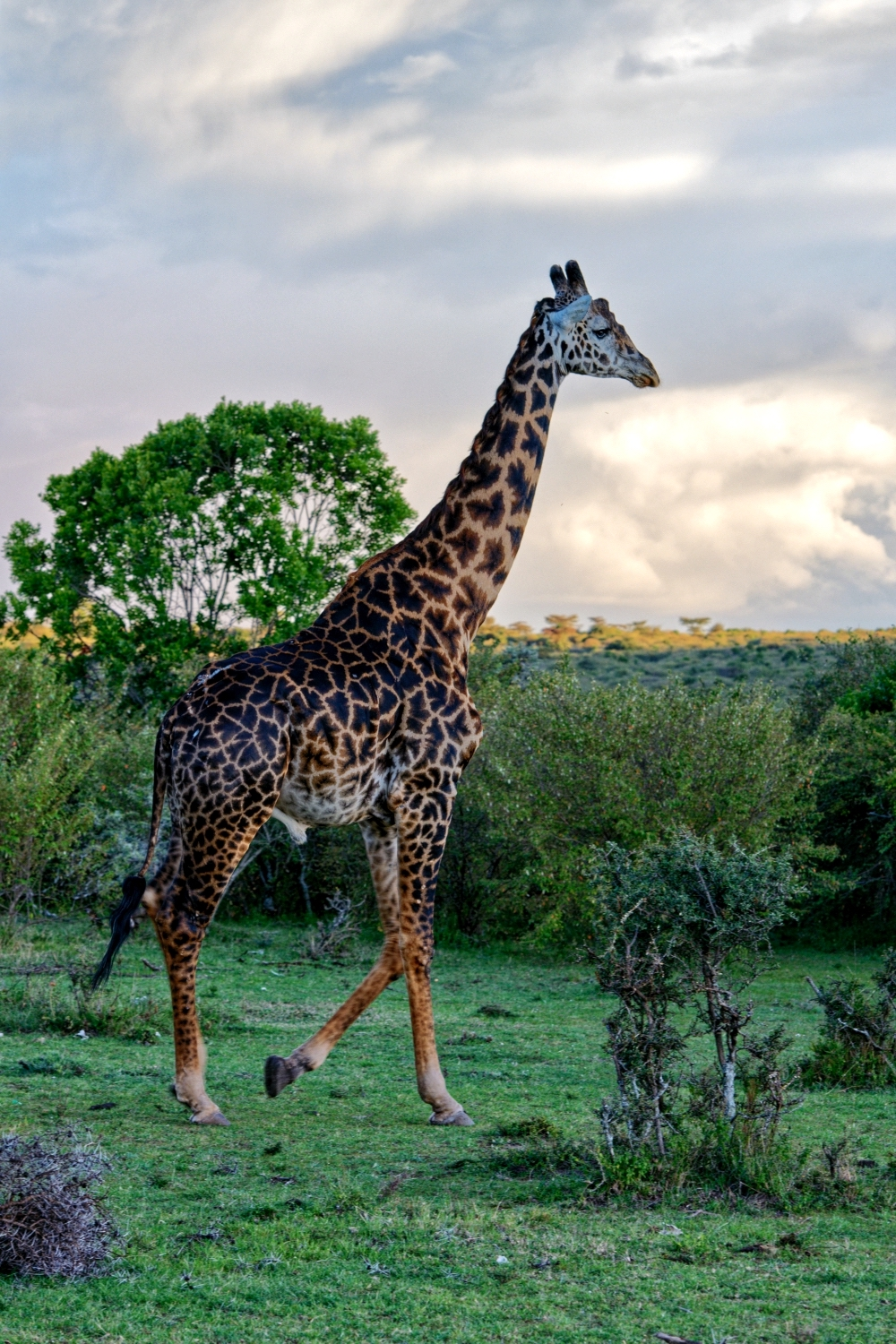
Male Maasai giraffe

== See also ==
- Maasai people
