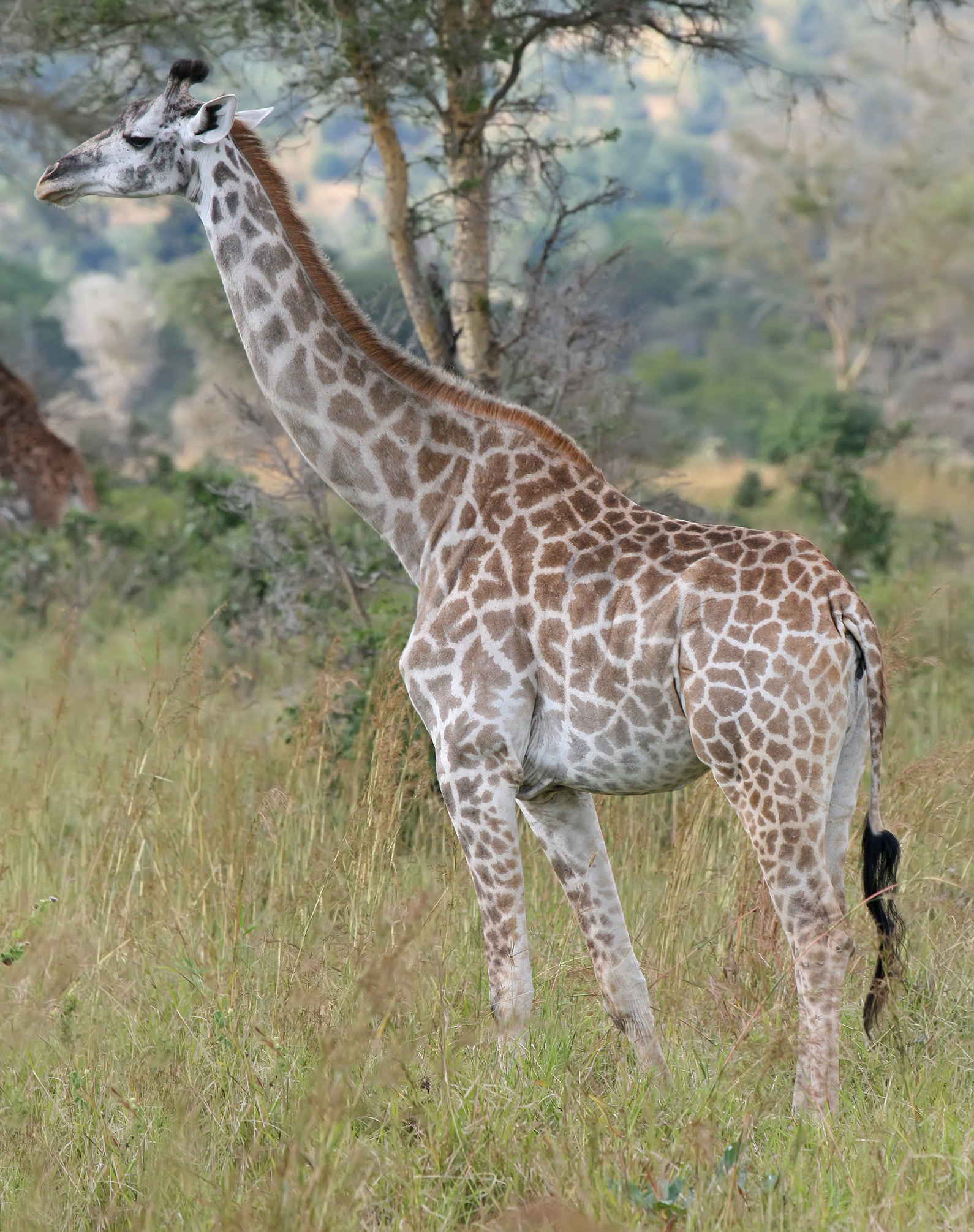
- Masai giraffe (Giraffa tippelskirchi) in Mikumi National Park, Tanzania

Conservation status
- Vulnerable (IUCN 3.1) (As the species complex)

Scientific classification
- Kingdom: Animalia
- Phylum: Chordata
- Class: Mammalia
- Order: Artiodactyla
- Family: Giraffidae
- Subfamily: Giraffinae
- Genus: Giraffa; Brisson, 1762

Species
- See taxonomy
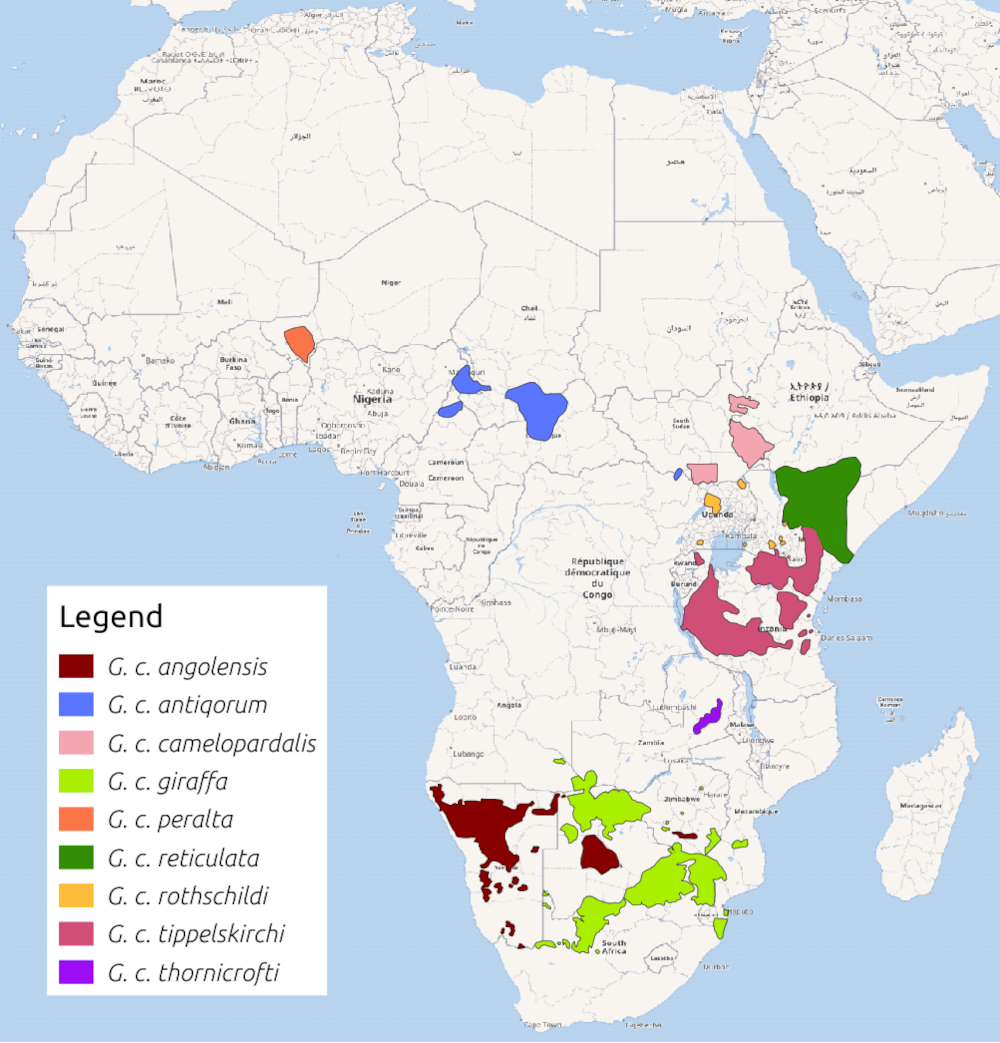
- Distribution of the giraffe genus

= Giraffe =

Giraffes Temporal range: 11.61–0 Ma Miocene to Recent

Tall African hoofed mammal

Giraffes (genus Giraffa) are large African hoofed mammals. They are the tallest living terrestrial animals and the largest ruminants on Earth. They are classified under the family Giraffidae, along with their closest extant relative, the okapi. Traditionally, giraffes have been thought of as one species, Giraffa camelopardalis, with nine subspecies. Most recently, researchers proposed dividing them into four extant species, with seven subspecies, which can be distinguished morphologically by their fur coat patterns. Six valid extinct species of Giraffa are known from the fossil record.

The distinguishing characteristics of giraffes are their extremely long neck and legs, horn-like ossicones, and spotted coat patterns. Their scattered range extends from Chad in the north to South Africa in the south and from Niger in the west to Somalia in the east. Giraffes usually inhabit savannahs and woodlands. Their food source is leaves, fruits, and flowers of woody plants, primarily acacia species, which they browse at heights most other ground-based herbivores cannot reach. Lions, leopards, spotted hyenas, and African wild dogs may prey upon giraffes. Giraffes live in herds of related females and their offspring or bachelor herds of unrelated adult males but are gregarious and may gather in large groups. Males establish social hierarchies through "necking", combat bouts in which they use the neck as a weapon. Dominant males gain mating access to females, which bear sole responsibility for rearing the young.

Giraffes have intrigued various ancient and modern cultures for their peculiar appearance and have often been featured in paintings, books, and cartoons. They have been extirpated from many parts of their former range. Giraffes are still found in many national parks and game reserves, and estimates as of 2016 indicate there are approximately 97,500 members of Giraffa in the wild. More than 1,600 were kept in zoos in 2010.

== Etymology ==
The name "giraffe" has its earliest known origins in the Arabic word zirāfah (زِرَافَةْ), of an ultimately unclear Sub-Saharan African language origin. The Middle English and early Modern English spellings, jarraf and ziraph, derive from the Arabic form-based Spanish and Portuguese girafa. The modern English form developed around 1600 from the French girafe.

"Camelopard" (/kəˈmɛləˌpɑːrd/) is an archaic English name for the giraffe; it derives from the Ancient Greek καμηλοπάρδαλις (kamēlopárdalis), from κάμηλος (kámēlos), "camel", and πάρδαλις (párdalis), "leopard", referring to its camel-like shape and leopard-like colouration.

== Taxonomy ==
Carl Linnaeus originally classified living giraffes as one species in 1758. He gave it the binomial name Cervus camelopardalis. Mathurin Jacques Brisson coined the generic name Giraffa in 1762. During the 1900s, various taxonomies with two or three species were proposed. A 2007 study on the genetics of giraffes using mitochondrial DNA suggested at least six lineages could be recognised as species. A 2011 study using detailed analyses of the morphology of giraffes, and application of the phylogenetic species concept, described eight species of living giraffes. A 2016 study also concluded that living giraffes consist of multiple species. The researchers suggested the existence of four species, which have not exchanged genetic information between each other for one to two million years.

A 2020 study showed that, depending on the method chosen, different taxonomic hypotheses recognizing from two to six species can be considered for the genus Giraffa. That study also found that multi-species coalescent methods can lead to taxonomic over-splitting, as those methods delimit geographic structures rather than species. The three-species hypothesis, which recognises G. camelopardalis, G. giraffa, and G. tippelskirchi, is highly supported by phylogenetic analyses and also corroborated by most population genetic and multi-species coalescent analyses. A 2021 whole genome sequencing study suggests the existence of four distinct species and seven subspecies, which was supported by a 2024 study of cranial morphology. A 2024 study found a higher amount of ancient gene flow than expected between populations.

The cladogram below shows the phylogenetic relationship between the four species and seven subspecies based on a 2021 genome analysis. The eight lineages correspond to eight traditional subspecies in the one-species hypothesis. The Rothschild giraffe is subsumed into G. camelopardalis camelopardalis.

- Giraffa
  - - Giraffa camelopardalis (northern giraffe)
      - - G. camelopardalis antiquorum (Kordofan giraffe)
        - G. c. camelopardalis (Nubian giraffe)
      - - G. c. peralta (West African giraffe)
    - G. reticulata (reticulated giraffe)
      - - (no subspecies)
  - - G. tippelskirchi (Masai giraffe sensu lato)
      - G. tippelskirchi tippelskirchi (Masai giraffe sensu stricto)
      - G. t. thornicrofti (Luangwa or Thornicroft's giraffe)
    - G. giraffa (southern giraffe)
      - G. giraffa angolensis (Angolan giraffe)
      - G. g. giraffa (South African giraffe)

The following table compares the different hypotheses for giraffe species. The description column shows the traditional nine subspecies in the one-species hypothesis.

Species and subspecies of giraffe
Description	Image	Eight species taxonomy	Four species taxonomy	Three species taxonomy
The Kordofan giraffe (G. c. antiquorum) has a distribution which includes southern Chad, the Central African Republic, northern Cameroon, and the northeastern Democratic Republic of the Congo. Populations in Cameroon were formerly included in G. c. peralta, but this was incorrect. Compared to the Nubian giraffe, this subspecies has smaller and more irregular spotting patterns. Its spots are present on insides of the legs, sometimes below the hocks. A median lump is present in males. Some 2,000 are believed to remain in the wild. Considerable confusion has existed over the status of this subspecies and G. c. peralta in zoos. In 2007, all alleged G. c. peralta in European zoos were shown to be, in fact, G. c. antiquorum. With this correction, about 65 are living in zoos.		Kordofan giraffe (G. antiquorum)	Northern giraffe (G. camelopardalis) Three or four subspecies: G. c. antiquorum; G. c. camelopardalis; G. c. peralta; G. c. reticulata (only in three-species hypothesis)	
The Nubian giraffe (G. c. camelopardalis), occurs in eastern South Sudan, southwestern Ethiopia, Kenya and Uganda. It has sharp-edged chestnut-coloured spots surrounded by mostly white lines, while undersides lack spotting. A lump is prominent in the middle of the male's head. Around 2,150 individuals are thought to remain in the wild. The Rothschild's and Nubian giraffes are very common in captivity, although the original phenotype is rare, and a group is kept at Al Ain Zoo in the United Arab Emirates.		Nubian giraffe (G. camelopardalis) Also known as Baringo giraffe or Ugandan giraffe Two subspecies: G. c. camelopardalis; G. c. rothschildi (Rothschild's giraffe)	Northern giraffe (G. camelopardalis) Three or four subspecies: G. c. antiquorum; G. c. camelopardalis; G. c. peralta; G. c. reticulata (only in three-species hypothesis)	
Rothschild's giraffe (G. c. rothschildi) has large dark patches with normally well-defined edges but sometimes split. The dark spots may also have swirls of pale colour within them. Spotting rarely reaches below the hocks and rarely to the hooves. This ecotype may also develop five "horns". It may be an ecotype of the Nubian giraffe. Its range includes parts of Uganda and Kenya. Its presence in South Sudan is uncertain. Around 1,500 individuals are thought to remain in the wild, and more than 450 are living in zoos. According to genetic analysis, it is conspecific with the Nubian giraffe.		Nubian giraffe (G. camelopardalis) Also known as Baringo giraffe or Ugandan giraffe Two subspecies: G. c. camelopardalis; G. c. rothschildi (Rothschild's giraffe)	Northern giraffe (G. camelopardalis) Three or four subspecies: G. c. antiquorum; G. c. camelopardalis; G. c. peralta; G. c. reticulata (only in three-species hypothesis)	
The West African giraffe (G. c. peralta) is endemic to southwestern Niger. It has a lighter fur than other subspecies, with red lobe-shaped blotches that reach under the hocks. The ossicones are more erect than in other subspecies, and males have well-developed median lumps. It is the most endangered subspecies within Giraffa, with 400 individuals remaining in the wild. Giraffes in Cameroon were formerly thought to belong to this subspecies, but are actually G. c. antiquorum. This error resulted in some confusion over its status in zoos, but in 2007 it was established that all "G. c. peralta" kept in European zoos are actually G. c. antiquorum. The West African giraffe is more closely related to Rothschild's giraffe than the Kordofan, and its ancestor may have migrated from eastern to northern Africa and then west as the Sahara Desert spread, and Lake Chad may have acted as a boundary between the West African and Kordofan giraffes during the Holocene.		West African giraffe (G. peralta), Also known as Niger giraffe or Nigerian giraffe	Northern giraffe (G. camelopardalis) Three or four subspecies: G. c. antiquorum; G. c. camelopardalis; G. c. peralta; G. c. reticulata (only in three-species hypothesis)	
The reticulated giraffe (G. c. reticulata) is native to northeastern Kenya, southern Ethiopia, and Somalia. Its distinctive coat pattern consists of sharp-edged, reddish-brown polygonal patches surrounded by thin white lines. Spots may or may not extend under the hocks, and a median lump is present in males. An estimated 8,660 individuals remain in the wild, and more than 450 were living in zoos as of 2010. The reticulated giraffe is the result of hybridisation between northern and southern giraffe lineages.		Reticulated giraffe (G. reticulata), Also known as Somali giraffe		
The Angolan giraffe (G. c. angolensis) occurs in northern Namibia, southwestern Zambia, central Botswana, western Zimbabwe, southern Zimbabwe and in Angola In 2009, it has been suggested that the northern Namib Desert and Etosha National Park populations form a separate subspecies. This subspecies is white with large brown blotches with pointed or cut edges. The spotting pattern extends throughout the legs but not the upper part of the face. The neck and rump patches tend to be fairly small. The subspecies also has a white ear mark. About 13,000 individuals are estimated to remain in the wild, and about 20 are living in zoos.		Angolan giraffe (G. angolensis) Also known as Namibian giraffe	Southern giraffe (G. giraffa) Two subspecies: G. g. angolensis; G. g. giraffa	
The South African giraffe (G. c. giraffa) occurs in northern South Africa, southern Botswana, northern Botswana and southwestern Mozambique. It has a tawny background colour marked with dark, somewhat rounded patches "with some fine projections". The spots extend down the legs, growing smaller as they do. The median lump of males is relatively small. A maximum of 31,500 individuals are estimated to remain in the wild, and around 45 are living in zoos.		South African giraffe (G. giraffa) Also known as Cape giraffe	Southern giraffe (G. giraffa) Two subspecies: G. g. angolensis; G. g. giraffa	
The Masai giraffe (G. c. tippelskirchi) occurs in central and southern Kenya and in Tanzania. Its coat pattern is diverse, with spots ranging from mostly rounded and smooth-edged to oval-shaped and incised or loped-edged. A median lump is usually present in males. A total of 32,550 individuals are thought to remain in the wild, and about 100 are living in zoos.		Masai giraffe (G. tippelskirchi) Also known as Kilimanjaro giraffe	Masai giraffe (G. tippelskirchi) Two subspecies: G. t. tippelskirchi; G. t. thornicrofti	
The Rhodesian giraffe (G. c. thornicrofti) is restricted to the Luangwa River Valley in eastern Zambia. It has notched and somewhat star-shaped patches which may extend across the legs. The median lump of males is modestly sized. No more than 550 individuals remain in the wild, but none in zoos. It was named after Harry Scott Thornicroft.		Thornicroft's giraffe ("G. thornicrofti") Also known as Luangwa giraffe or Rhodesian giraffe	Masai giraffe (G. tippelskirchi) Two subspecies: G. t. tippelskirchi; G. t. thornicrofti	

The first extinct species to be described was Giraffa sivalensis from India, the holotype of which was reevaluated as a vertebra of separate species within the genus that was initially described as a fossil of the living giraffe. Another extinct species Giraffa punjabiensis is known from Pakistan. Four other valid extinct species of Giraffa in Africa are Giraffa gracilis, Giraffa jumae, Giraffa pygmaea and Giraffa stillei. "G." pomeli from Algeria and Tunisia is not a Giraffinae species, but a Palaeotraginae species related to Mitilanotherium.

== Evolution ==
Giraffes, along with the okapi, are the only living members of family Giraffidae in the order Artiodactyla. They are ruminants of the clade Pecora, along with Antilocapridae (pronghorns), Cervidae (deer), Bovidae (cattle, antelope, goats and sheep) and Moschidae (musk deer). A 2019 genome study (cladogram below) finds that Giraffidae are a sister taxon to Antilocapridae, with an estimated split of over 20 million years ago.

- Ruminantia
  - Tragulina
    Tragulidae
  - Pecora
    - - Antilocapridae
      - Giraffidae
    - - Cervidae
      - - Bovidae
        - Moschidae

The family Giraffidae was once much more extensive, with over 10 fossil genera described. The elongation of the neck appears to have started early in the giraffe lineage. Comparisons between giraffes and their ancient relatives suggest vertebrae close to the skull lengthened earlier, followed by lengthening of vertebrae further down. One early giraffid ancestor was Canthumeryx, which has been dated variously to have lived 25 to 20 million years ago, 17 to 15 million years ago or 18 to 14.3 million years ago and whose deposits have been found in Libya. This animal resembled an antelope and had a medium-sized, lightly built body. Giraffokeryx appeared 15 to 12 million years ago on the Indian subcontinent and resembled an okapi or a small giraffe, and had a longer neck and similar ossicones. Giraffokeryx may have shared a clade with more massively built giraffids like Sivatherium and Bramatherium.

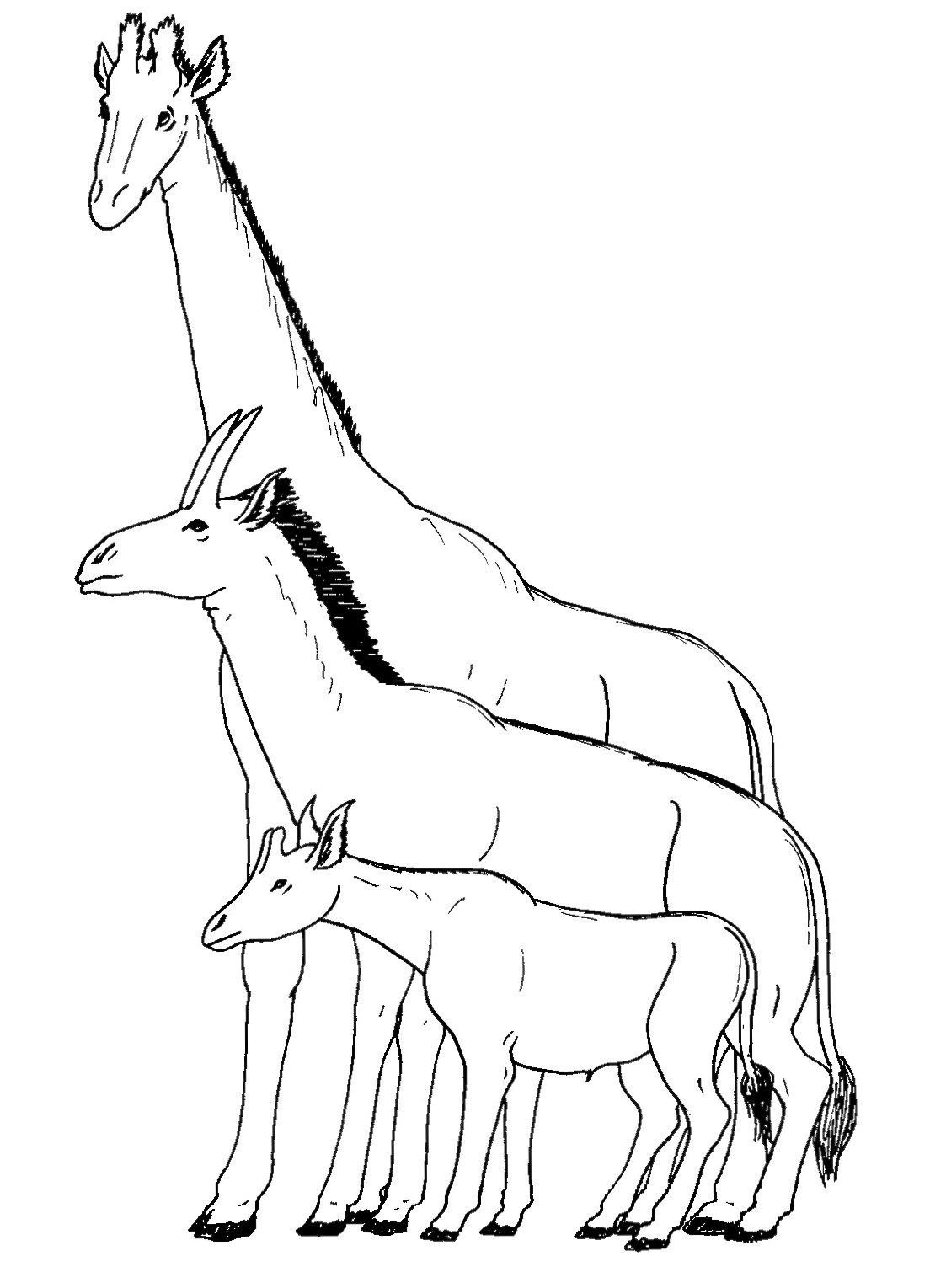
The extinct giraffid Samotherium (middle) in comparison with the okapi (below) and giraffe. The anatomy of Samotherium appears to have shown a transition to a giraffe-like neck.

Giraffids like Palaeotragus, Shansitherium and Samotherium appeared 14 million years ago and lived throughout Africa and Eurasia. These animals had broader skulls with reduced frontal cavities. Paleotragus resembled the okapi and may have been its ancestor. Others find that the okapi lineage diverged earlier, before Giraffokeryx. Samotherium was a particularly important transitional fossil in the giraffe lineage, as the length and structure of its cervical vertebrae were between those of a modern giraffe and an okapi, and its neck posture was likely similar to the former's. Bohlinia, which first appeared in southeastern Europe and lived 9 to 7 million years ago, was likely a direct ancestor of Giraffa. Bohlinia closely resembled modern giraffes, having a long neck and legs and similar ossicones and dentition.

Bohlinia colonised China and northern India and produced the Giraffa, which, around 7 million years ago, reached Africa. Climate changes led to the extinction of the Asian giraffes, while the African giraffes survived and radiated into new species. Living giraffes appear to have arisen around 1 million years ago in eastern Africa during the Pleistocene. Some biologists suggest the modern giraffes descended from G. jumae; others find G. gracilis a more likely candidate. G. jumae was larger and more robust, while G. gracilis was smaller and more slender.

The changes from extensive forests to more open habitats, which began 8 million years ago, are believed to be the main driver for the evolution of giraffes. During this time, tropical plants disappeared and were replaced by arid C4 plants, and a dry savannah emerged across eastern and northern Africa and western India. Some researchers have hypothesised that this new habitat, coupled with a different diet, including acacia species, may have exposed giraffe ancestors to toxins that caused higher mutation rates and a higher rate of evolution. The coat patterns of modern giraffes may also have coincided with these habitat changes. Asian giraffes are hypothesised to have had more okapi-like colourations.

The Masai giraffe genome is around 2.9 billion base pairs in length, compared to the 3.3 billion base pairs of the okapi. Of the proteins in giraffe and okapi genes, 19.4% are identical. The divergence of giraffe and okapi lineages dates to around 11.5 million years ago. A small group of regulatory genes in the giraffe appears responsible for the animal's height and associated circulatory adaptations.

== Anatomy ==
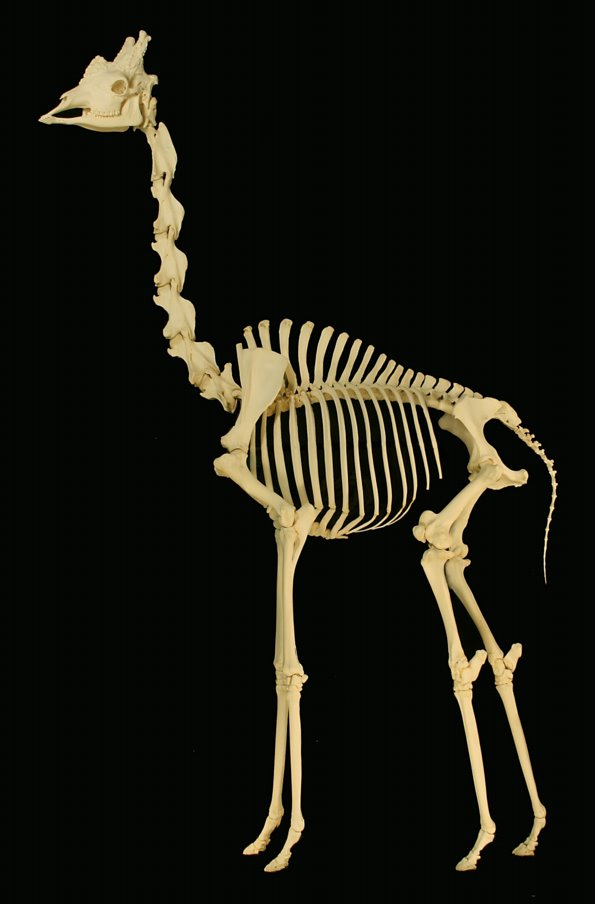
Giraffe skeleton on display at the Museum of Osteology, Oklahoma City

Fully grown giraffes stand 4.3–5.7 m (14–19 ft) tall, with males taller than females. The average weight is 1,192 kg (2,628 lb) for an adult male and 828 kg (1,825 lb) for an adult female. Despite its long neck and legs, its body is relatively short. The skin is mostly gray or tan, and can reach a thickness of 20 mm (0.79 in). The 80–100 cm (31–39 in) long tail ends in a long, dark tuft of hair and is used as a defense against insects.

The coat has dark blotches or patches, which can be orange, chestnut, brown, or nearly black, surrounded by light hair, usually white or cream coloured. Male giraffes become darker as they grow old. The coat pattern has been claimed to serve as camouflage in the light and shade patterns of savannah woodlands. When standing among trees and bushes, they are hard to see at even a few metres distance. However, adult giraffes move about to gain the best view of an approaching predator, relying on their size and ability to defend themselves rather than on camouflage, which may be more important for calves. Each giraffe has a unique coat pattern. Calves inherit some coat pattern traits from their mothers, and variation in some spot traits is correlated with calf survival. The skin under the blotches may regulate the animal's body temperature, being sites for complex blood vessel systems and large sweat glands. Spotless or solid-colour giraffes are very rare, but have been observed.

The fur may give the animal chemical defense, as its parasite repellents give it a characteristic scent. At least 11 main aromatic chemicals are in the fur, although indole and 3-methylindole are responsible for most of the smell. Because males have a stronger odour than females, it may also have a sexual function.

=== Head ===
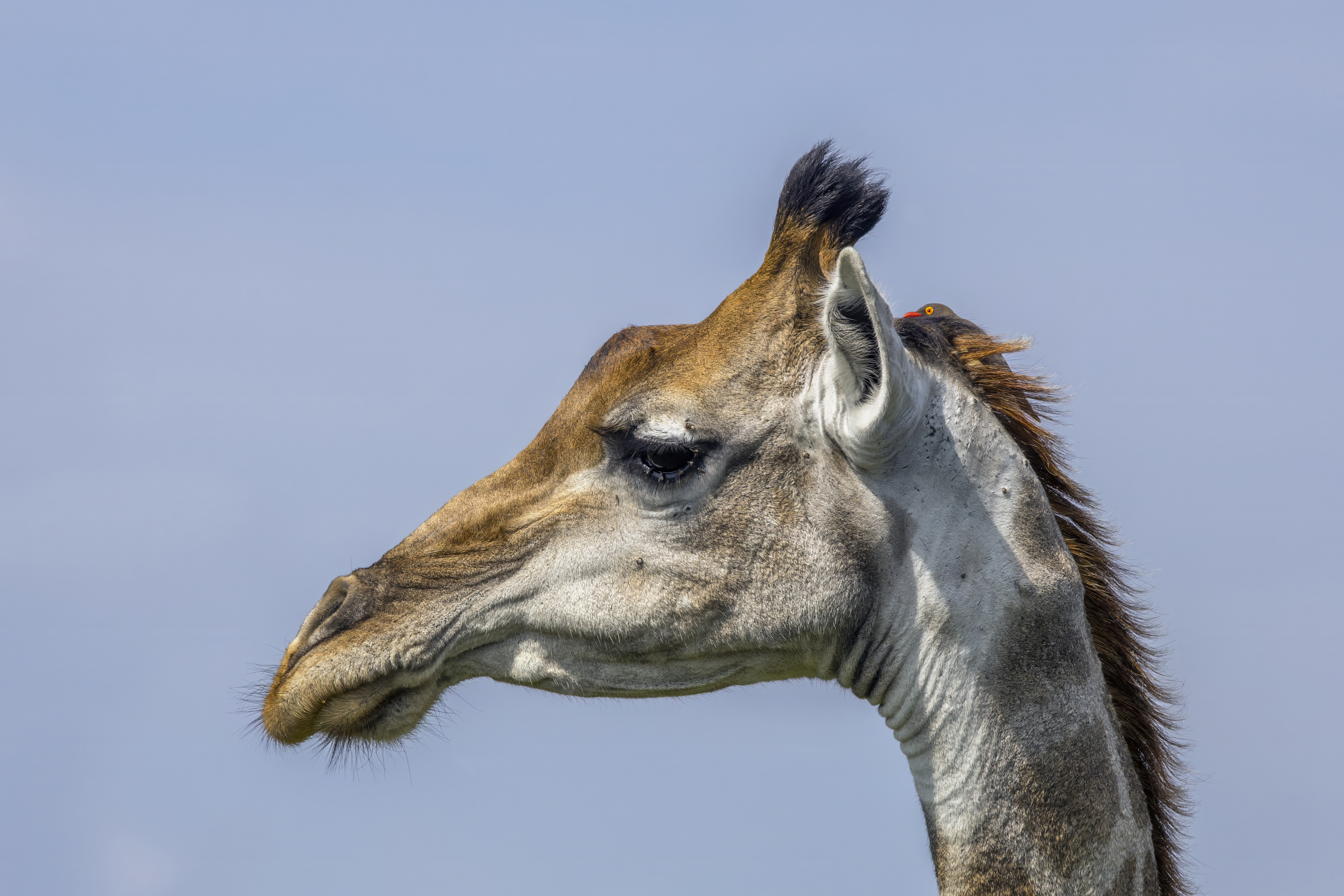
Closeup of the head of a Southern giraffe

Both sexes have prominent horn-like structures called ossicones, which can reach 13.5 cm (5.3 in). They are formed from ossified cartilage, covered in skin, and fused to the skull at the parietal bones. Being vascularised, the ossicones may have a role in thermoregulation, and are used in combat between males. Appearance is a reliable guide to the sex or age of a giraffe: the ossicones of females and young are thin and display tufts of hair on top, whereas those of adult males tend to be bald and knobbed on top. A lump, which is more prominent in males, emerges in the middle of the skull. Males develop calcium deposits that form bumps on their skulls as they age. Multiple sinuses lighten a giraffe's skull. However, as males age, their skulls become heavier and more club-like, helping them become more dominant in combat. The occipital condyles at the bottom of the skull allow the animal to tip its head over 90 degrees and grab food on the branches directly above them with the tongue.

With eyes located on the sides of the head, the giraffe has a broad visual field from its great height. Compared to other hoofed mammals, giraffe vision is more binocular and the eyes are larger with a greater retinal surface area. Giraffes may see in colour, and their senses of hearing and smell are sharp. The ears are movable. The nostrils are slit-shaped, possibly to withstand blowing sand. A giraffe's tongue is about 45 cm (18 in) long. It is black, perhaps to protect against sunburn, and can grasp foliage and delicately pick off leaves. The upper lip is flexible and hairy to protect against sharp prickles. The upper jaw has a hard palate instead of front teeth. The molars and premolars are wide with low crowns on the surface.

=== Neck ===
Giraffes have an extremely elongated neck, which can be up to 2.4 m (7.9 ft) in length. Along the neck is a mane made of short, erect hairs. The neck typically rests at an angle of 50–60 degrees, though juveniles are closer to 70 degrees. The long neck results from a disproportionate lengthening of the cervical vertebrae, not from the addition of more vertebrae. Each cervical vertebra is over 28 cm (11 in) long. They comprise 52–54 per cent of the length of the giraffe's vertebral column, compared with the 27–33 percent typical of similar large hoofed mammals, including the giraffe's closest living relative, the okapi. This elongation largely takes place after birth, perhaps because giraffe mothers would have a difficult time giving birth to young with the same neck proportions as adults. The giraffe's head and neck are held up by large muscles and a nuchal ligament, which are anchored by long thoracic vertebrae spines, giving them a hump.

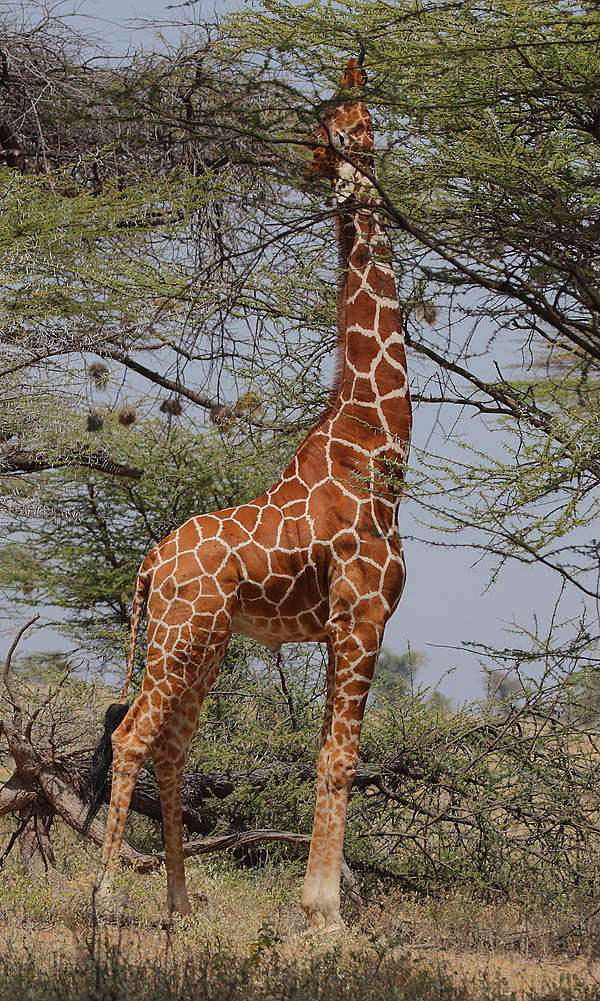
Adult male reticulated giraffe feeding high on an acacia, in Kenya

The giraffe's neck vertebrae have ball and socket joints. The point of articulation between the cervical and thoracic vertebrae of giraffes is shifted to lie between the first and second thoracic vertebrae (T1 and T2), unlike in most other ruminants, where the articulation is between the seventh cervical vertebra (C7) and T1. This allows C7 to contribute directly to increased neck length and has given rise to the suggestion that T1 is actually C8, and that giraffes have added an extra cervical vertebra. However, this proposition is not generally accepted, as T1 has other morphological features, such as an articulating rib, deemed diagnostic of thoracic vertebrae, and because exceptions to the mammalian limit of seven cervical vertebrae are generally characterised by increased neurological anomalies and maladies.

There are several hypotheses regarding the evolutionary origin and maintenance of elongation in giraffe necks. Charles Darwin originally suggested the "competing browsers hypothesis", which has been challenged only recently. It suggests that competitive pressure from smaller browsers, like kudu, steenbok and impala, encouraged the elongation of the neck, as it enabled giraffes to reach food that competitors could not. This advantage is real, as giraffes can and do feed up to 4.5 m (15 ft) high, while even quite large competitors, such as kudu, can feed up to only about 2 m (6 ft 7 in) high. There is also research suggesting that browsing competition is intense at lower levels, and giraffes feed more efficiently (gaining more leaf biomass with each mouthful) high in the canopy. However, scientists disagree about just how much time giraffes spend feeding at levels beyond the reach of other browsers, and a 2010 study found that adult giraffes with longer necks actually suffered higher mortality rates under drought conditions than their shorter-necked counterparts. This study suggests that maintaining a longer neck requires more nutrients, which puts longer-necked giraffes at risk during a food shortage.

Another theory, the sexual selection hypothesis, proposes that long necks evolved as a secondary sexual characteristic, giving males an advantage in "necking" contests to establish dominance and obtain access to sexually receptive females. In support of this theory, some studies have stated that necks are longer and heavier for males than females of the same age, and that males do not employ other forms of combat. However, a 2024 study found that, while males have thicker necks, females actually have proportionally longer ones, which is likely because of their greater need to find more food to sustain themselves and their dependent young. It has also been proposed that the neck serves to give the animal greater vigilance.

=== Legs, locomotion and posture ===
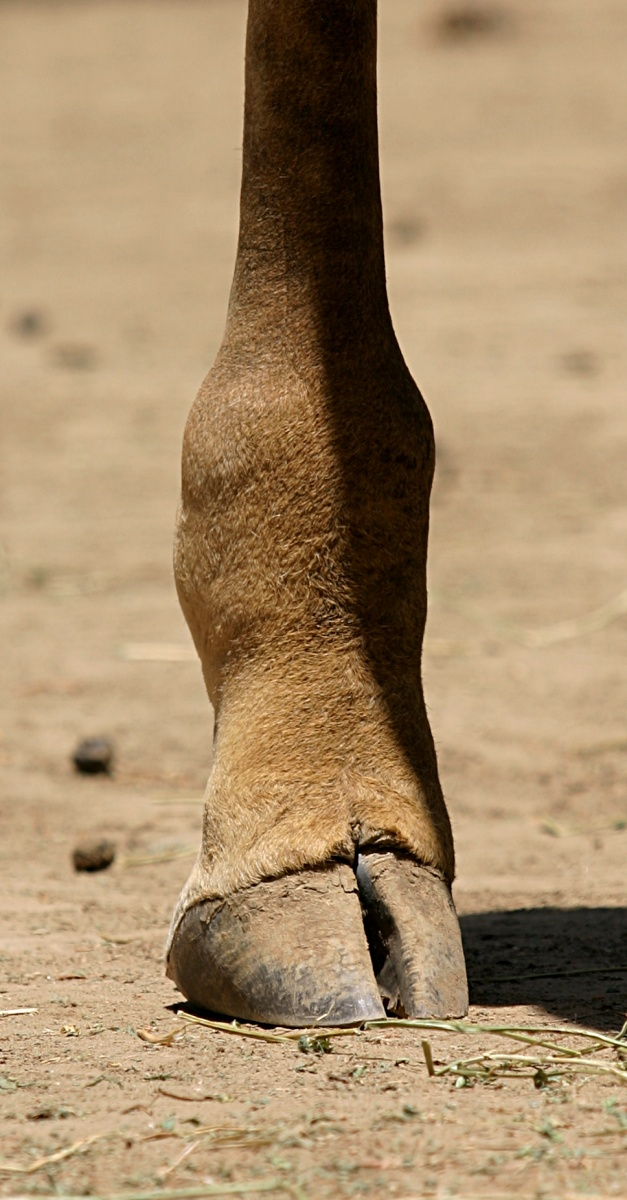
Right hind leg of a Masai giraffe at the San Diego Zoo

The front legs tend to be longer than the hind legs, and males have proportionally longer front legs than females, which gives them better support when swinging their necks during fights. The leg bones lack first, second and fifth metapodials. It appears that a suspensory ligament allows the lanky legs to support the animal's great weight. The hooves of large male giraffes reach 31 cm × 23 cm (12.2 in × 9.1 in) in diameter. The fetlock of the leg is low to the ground, allowing the hoof to better support the animal's weight. Giraffes lack dewclaws and interdigital glands. While the pelvis is relatively short, the ilium has stretched-out crests.

A giraffe has only two gaits: walking and galloping. Walking is done by moving the legs on one side of the body, then doing the same on the other side. When galloping, the hind legs move around the front legs before the latter move forward, and the tail will curl up. The movements of the head and neck provide balance and control momentum while galloping. A giraffe can reach a sprint speed of up to 60 km/h (37 mph), and can sustain 50 km/h (31 mph) for several kilometres. Giraffes would probably not be competent swimmers as their long legs would be highly cumbersome in the water, although they might be able to float. When swimming, the thorax would be weighed down by the front legs, making it difficult for the animal to move its neck and legs in harmony or keep its head above the water's surface.

A juvenile giraffe walking in Malawi

A giraffe rests by lying with its body on top of its folded legs. To lie down, the animal kneels on its front legs and then lowers the rest of its body. To get back up, it first gets on its front knees and positions its backside on top of its hindlegs. It then pulls the backside upwards, and the front legs stand straight up again. At each stage, the animal swings its head for balance. If the giraffe wants to reach down to drink, it either spreads its front legs or bends its knees. Studies in captivity found that giraffes sleep intermittently around 4.6 hours per day, mostly at night. It usually sleeps lying down; however, standing sleeps have been recorded, particularly in older individuals. Intermittent short "deep sleep" phases while lying are characterised by the giraffe bending its neck backwards and resting its head on the hip or thigh, a position believed to indicate paradoxical sleep.

=== Internal systems ===
Scheme of path of the recurrent laryngeal nerve in giraffe

In mammals, the left recurrent laryngeal nerve is longer than the right; in a giraffe, it is over 30 cm (12 in) longer. These nerves are longer in giraffes than in any other living animal; the left nerve is over 2 m (6 ft 7 in) long. Each nerve cell in this path begins in the brainstem and passes down the neck along the vagus nerve, then branches off into the recurrent laryngeal nerve which passes back up the neck to the larynx. Thus, these nerve cells have a length of nearly 5 m (16 ft) in the largest giraffes. Despite its long neck and large skull, the brain of the giraffe is typical for a hoofed mammal. Evaporative heat loss in the nasal passages keep the giraffe's brain cool. The shape of the skeleton gives the giraffe a small lung volume relative to its mass. Its long neck gives it a large amount of dead space, though this is limited by its narrow windpipe. The giraffe also has a high tidal volume, so the balance of dead space and tidal volume is much the same as other mammals. The animal can still provide enough oxygen for its tissues, and it can increase its respiratory rate and oxygen diffusion when running.

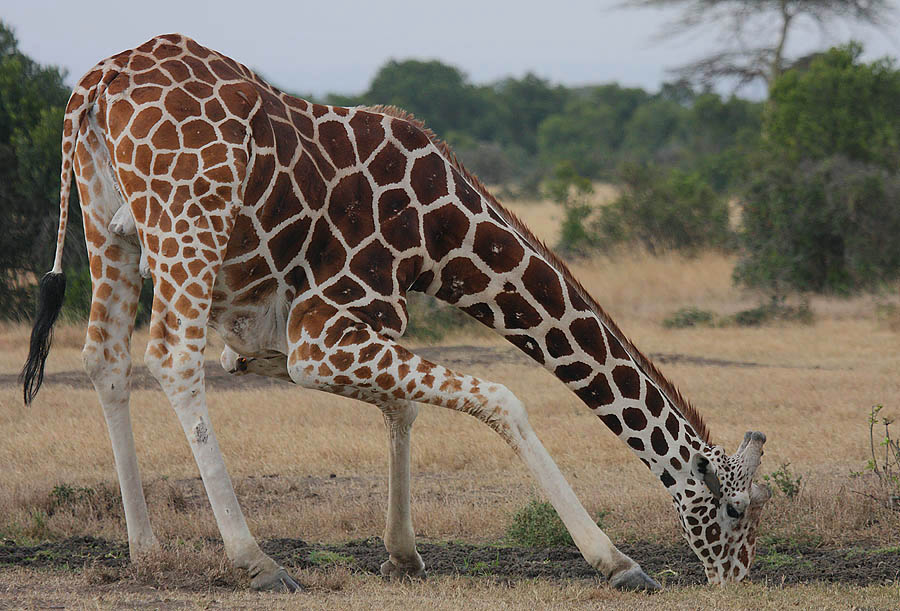
Reticulated giraffe bending down to drink in Kenya. The circulatory system is adapted to deal with blood flow rushing down its neck.

A giraffe's circulatory system has several adaptations to compensate for its great height. Its 11 kg (25 lb) and 60 cm (2 ft) heart must generate approximately double the blood pressure required for a human to maintain blood flow to the brain. As such, the wall of the heart can be as thick as 7.5 cm (3.0 in). Giraffes have relatively high heart rates for their size, at 150 beats per minute. When the animal lowers its head, the blood rushes down fairly unopposed and a rete mirabile in the upper neck, with its large cross-sectional area, prevents excess blood flow to the brain. When it raises again, the blood vessels constrict and push blood into the brain so the animal does not faint. The jugular veins contain several (most commonly seven) valves to prevent blood flowing back into the head from the inferior vena cava and right atrium while the head is lowered. Conversely, the blood vessels in the lower legs are under great pressure because of the weight of fluid pressing down on them. To solve this problem, the skin of the lower legs is thick and tight, preventing too much blood from pouring into them.

Giraffes have oesophageal muscles that are strong enough to allow regurgitation of food from the stomach up the neck and into the mouth for rumination. They have four-chambered stomachs, which are adapted to their specialized diet. The intestines of an adult giraffe measure more than 70 m (230 ft) in length and have a relatively small ratio of small to large intestine. Giraffes have a small, compact liver. In fetuses there may be a small gallbladder that vanishes before birth.

== Behaviour and ecology ==
=== Habitat and feeding ===
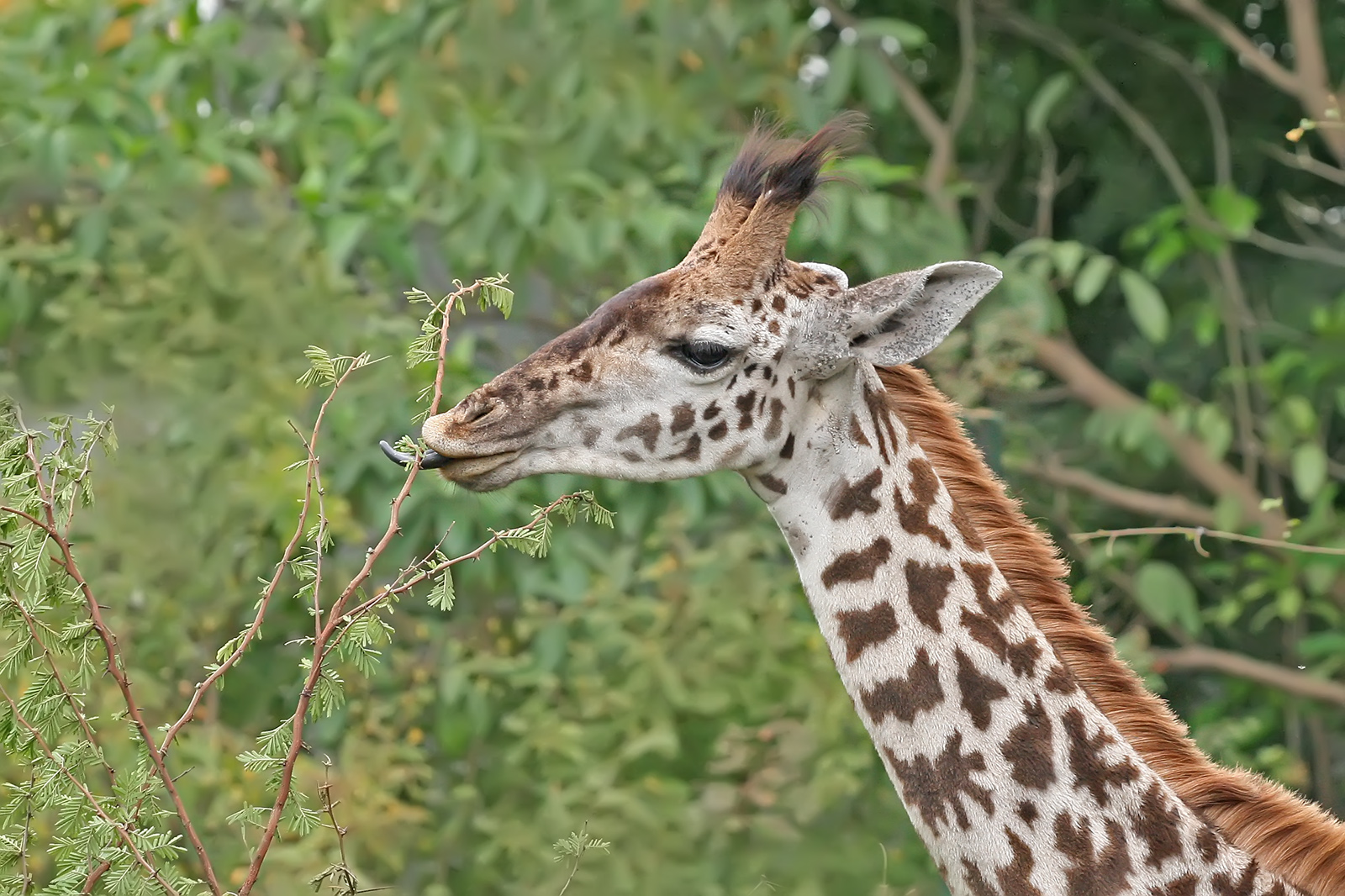
A Masai giraffe extending its tongue to feed, in Tanzania.

A giraffe in Malawi eating leaves from a tree

Giraffes usually inhabit savannahs and open woodlands. They prefer areas dominated by Acacieae, Commiphora, Combretum and Terminalia trees over Brachystegia which are more densely spaced. The Angolan giraffe can be found in desert environments. Giraffes browse on the twigs of trees, preferring those of the subfamily Acacieae and the genera Commiphora and Terminalia, which are important sources of calcium and protein to sustain the giraffe's growth rate. They also feed on shrubs, grass and fruit. A giraffe eats around 34 kg (75 lb) of plant matter daily. When stressed, giraffes may chew on large branches, stripping them of bark. Giraffes are also recorded to chew old bones.

During the wet season, food is abundant and giraffes are more spread out, while during the dry season, they gather around the remaining evergreen trees and bushes. Mothers tend to feed in open areas, presumably to make it easier to detect predators, although this may reduce their feeding efficiency. As a ruminant, the giraffe first chews its food, then swallows it for processing and then visibly passes the half-digested cud up the neck and back into the mouth to chew again. A giraffe requires less food than many other herbivores because the foliage it eats has more concentrated nutrients and it has a more efficient digestive system. The animal's faeces come in the form of small pellets. When it has access to water, a giraffe will go no more than three days without drinking. The drinking method of giraffes has been a source of speculation for its apparent defiance of gravity; one theory contemplates the animal's long neck functions like a plunger pump.

Giraffes have a great effect on the trees that they feed on, delaying the growth of young trees for some years and giving "waistlines" to particularly tall trees. Feeding is at its highest during the first and last hours of daytime. Between these hours, giraffes mostly stand and ruminate. Rumination is the dominant activity during the night, when it is mostly done lying down.

=== Social life ===
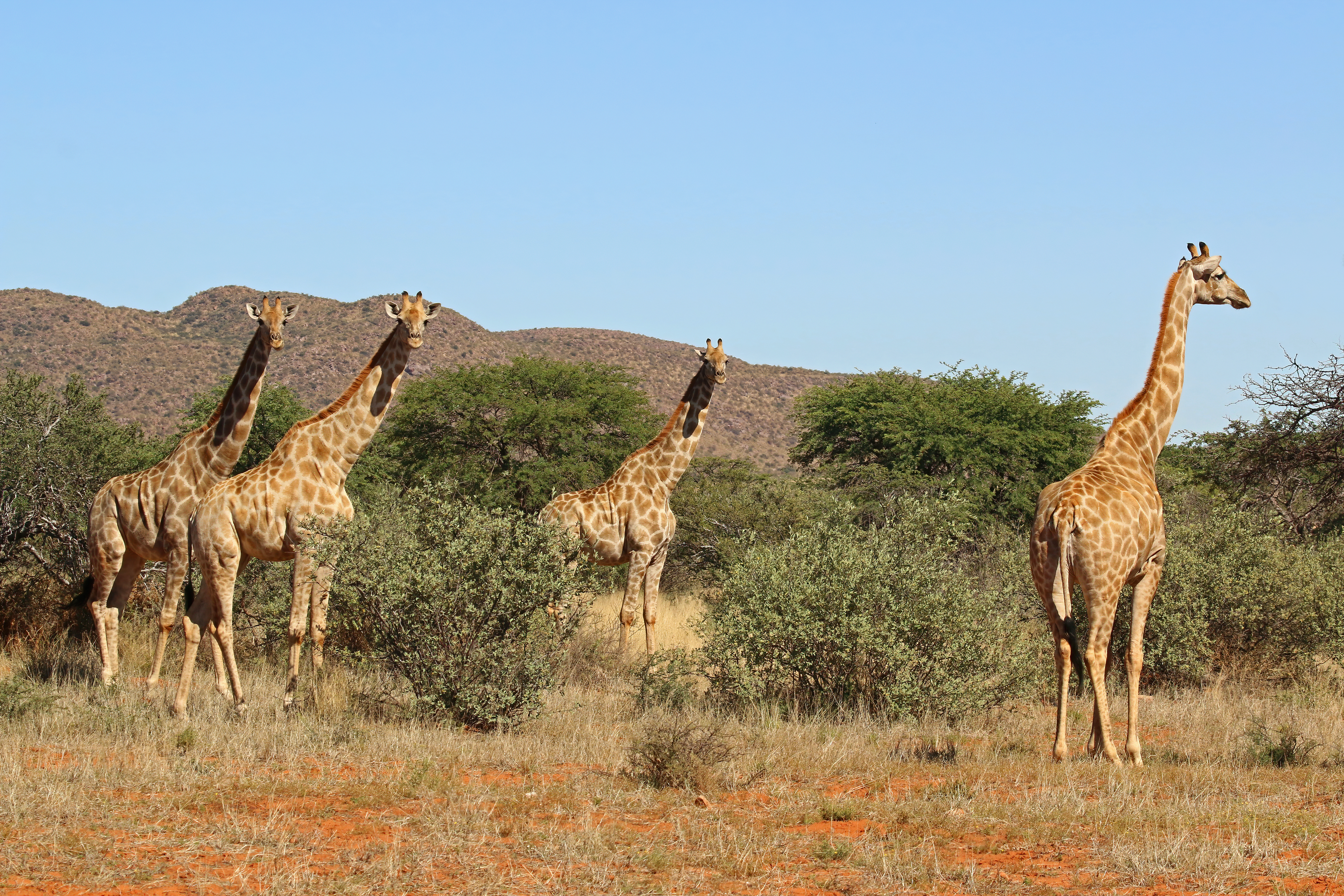
Gathering of female South African giraffes in Tswalu Kalahari Reserve, South Africa. These animals commonly gather in herds.

Giraffes usually form groups that vary in size and composition according to ecological, anthropogenic (man-made), temporal (time), and social factors. Traditionally, the composition of these groups had been described as open and ever-changing. For research purposes, a "group" has been defined as "a collection of individuals that are less than a kilometre apart and moving in the same general direction". More recent studies have found that giraffes have long-lasting social groups or cliques based on kinship, sex or other factors, and these groups regularly associate with other groups in larger communities or sub-communities within a fission–fusion society. Proximity to humans can disrupt social arrangements. Masai giraffes in Tanzania sort themselves into different subpopulations of 60–90 adult females with overlapping ranges, each of which differ in reproductive rates and calf mortality. Dispersal is male biased, and can include spatial and/or social dispersal. Adult female subpopulations are connected by males into super communities of around 300 animals.

Giraffe hum
Giraffe hum, ogg/Vorbis format.

Giraffe snort
Giraffe snort ogg/Vorbis format.

Giraffe grunt
Giraffe grunt ogg/Vorbis format.

Giraffe bursts
Giraffe bursts ogg/Vorbis format

The number of giraffes in a group can range from one to 66 individuals. Giraffe groups tend to be sex-segregated, although mixed-sex groups made of adult females and young males also occur. Female groups may be maternally related. Generally, females are more selective than males when deciding which individuals of the same sex they associate with. Particularly stable giraffe groups are those made of mothers and their young, which can last weeks or months. Young males also form groups and will engage in playfights. However, as they get older, males become more solitary but may also associate in pairs or with female groups. Giraffes are not territorial, but they have home ranges that vary according to rainfall and proximity to human settlements. Male giraffes occasionally roam far from areas that they normally frequent.

Early biologists suggested giraffes were mute and unable to create enough air flow to vibrate their vocal folds. This has been proved to the contrary; they have been recorded to communicate using snorts, sneezes, coughs, snores, hisses, bursts, moans, grunts, growls, and flute-like sounds. During courtship, males emit loud coughs. Females call their young by bellowing. Calves will emit bleaing, mooing, and mewing sounds. Snorting and hissing is associated with vigilance. During nighttime, giraffes appear to hum to each other. There is some evidence that giraffes use Helmholtz resonance to create infrasound. They also communicate with body language. Dominant males display to other males with an erect posture; holding the chin and head up while walking stiffly and displaying their side. The less dominant show submissiveness by dropping the head and ears, lowering the chin and fleeing.

=== Reproduction and parental care ===
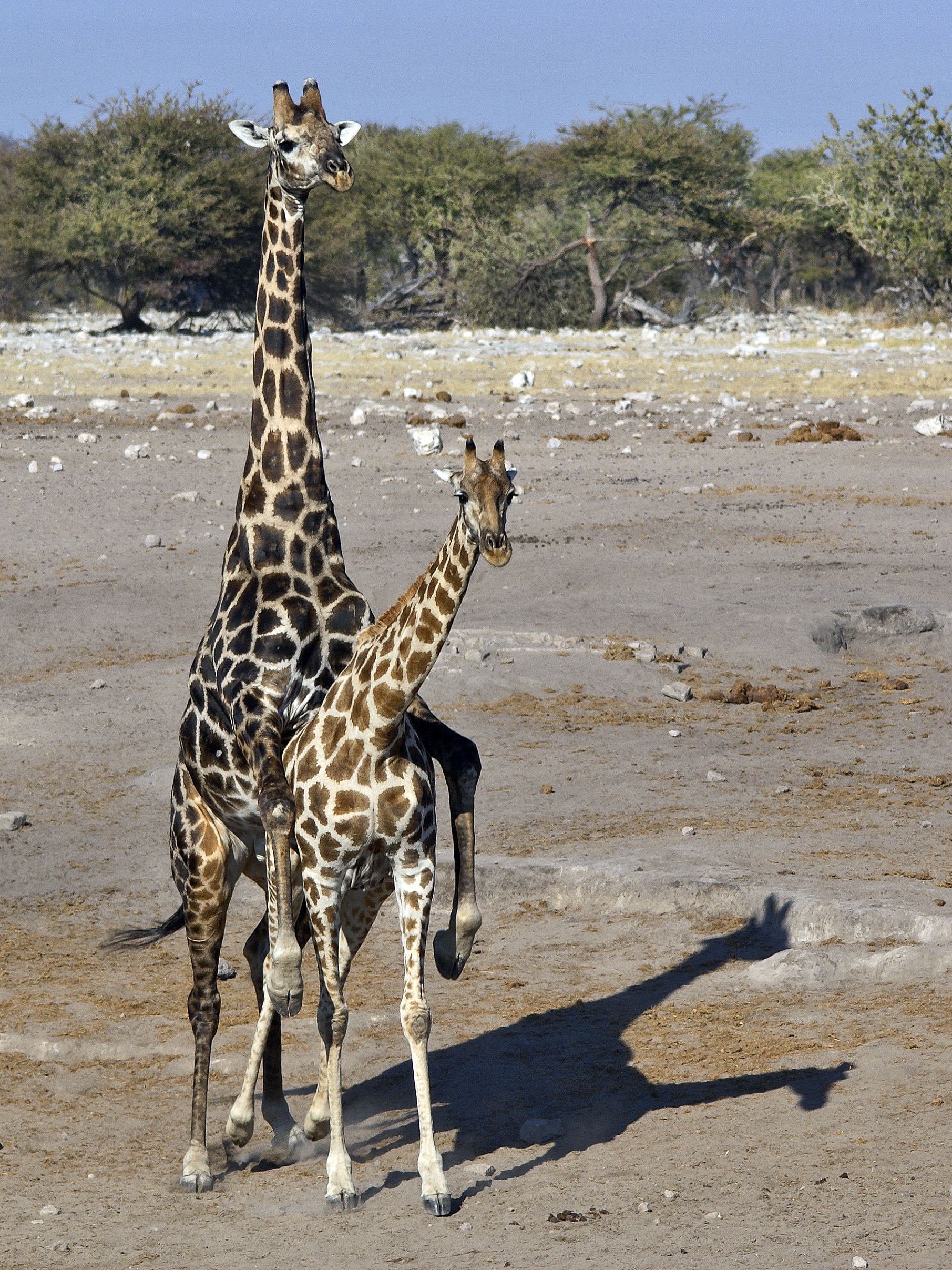
Angolan giraffes mating in Namibia

Reproduction in giraffes is broadly polygamous: a few older males mate with the fertile females. Females can reproduce throughout the year and experience oestrus cycling approximately every 15 days. Female giraffes in oestrus are dispersed over space and time, so reproductive adult males adopt a strategy of roaming among female groups to seek mating opportunities, with periodic hormone-induced rutting behaviour approximately every two weeks. Males prefer young adult females over juveniles and older adults.

Male giraffes assess female fertility by tasting the female's urine to detect oestrus, in a multi-step process known as the flehmen response. Once an oestrous female is detected, the male will attempt to court her. When courting, dominant males will keep subordinate ones at bay. A courting male may lick a female's tail, lay his head and neck on her body or nudge her with his ossicones. During copulation, the male stands on his hind legs with his head held up and his front legs resting on the female's sides.

Giraffe gestation lasts 400–460 days, after which a single calf is normally born, although twins occur on rare occasions. The mother gives birth standing up. The calf emerges head and front legs first, having broken through the fetal membranes, and falls to the ground, severing the umbilical cord. A newborn giraffe is 1.7–2 m (5 ft 7 in – 6 ft 7 in) tall. Within a few hours of birth, the calf can run around and is almost indistinguishable from a one-week-old. However, for the first one to three weeks, it spends most of its time hiding, its coat pattern providing camouflage. The ossicones, which have lain flat in the womb, raise up in a few days.

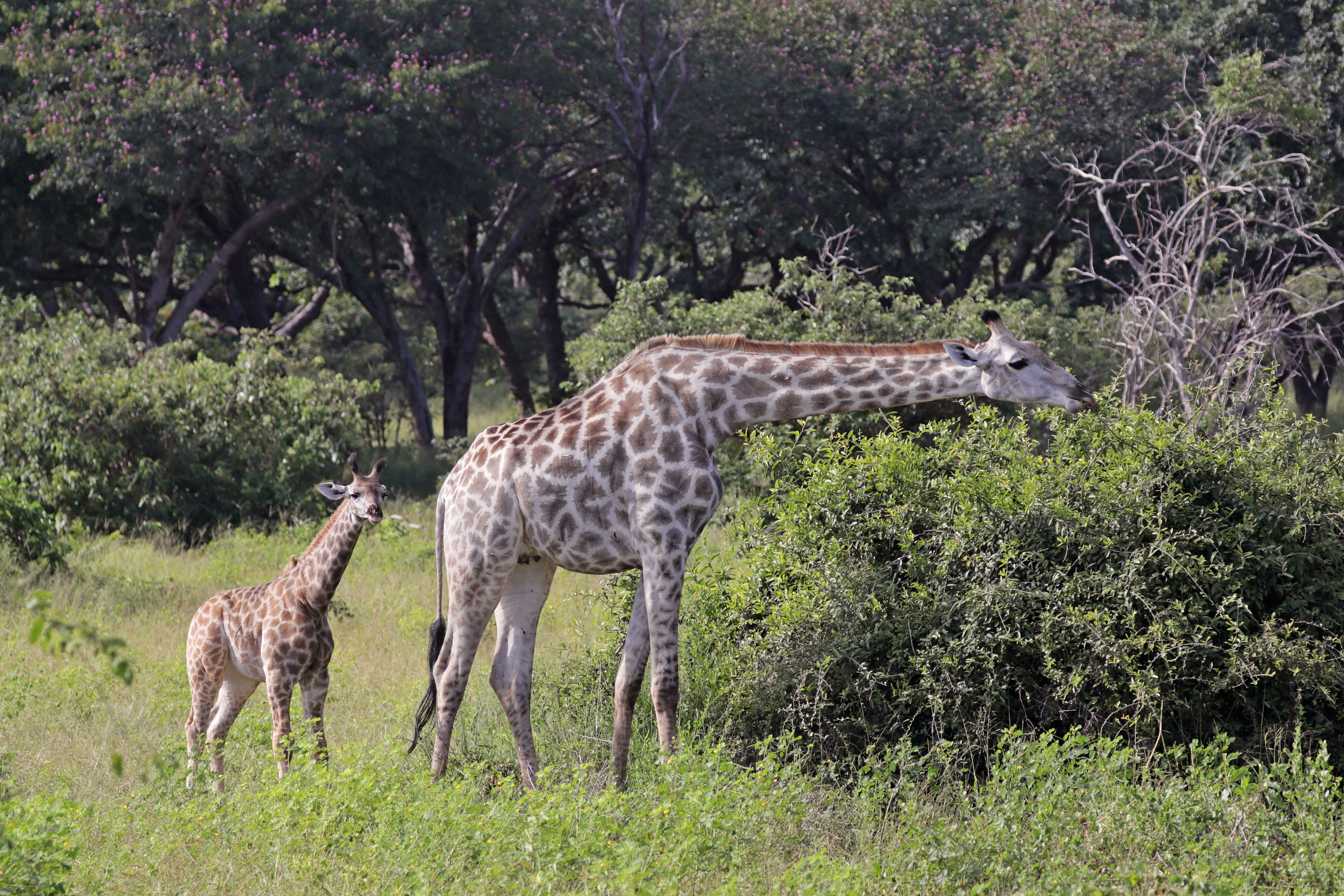
Female Angolan giraffe with calf

Mothers with calves will gather in nursery herds, moving or browsing together. Mothers in such a group may sometimes leave their calves with one female while they forage and drink elsewhere. This is known as a "calving pool". Calves are at risk of predation, and a mother giraffe will stand over them and kick at an approaching predator. Females watching calving pools will only alert their own young if they detect a disturbance, although the others will take notice and follow. Allo-sucking, where a calf will suckle a female other than its mother, has been recorded in both wild and captive giraffes. Calves first ruminate at four to six months and stop nursing at six to eight months. Young may not reach independence until they are 14 months old. Females are able to reproduce at four years of age, while spermatogenesis in males begins at three to four years of age. Males must wait until they are at least seven years old to gain the opportunity to mate.

=== Necking ===
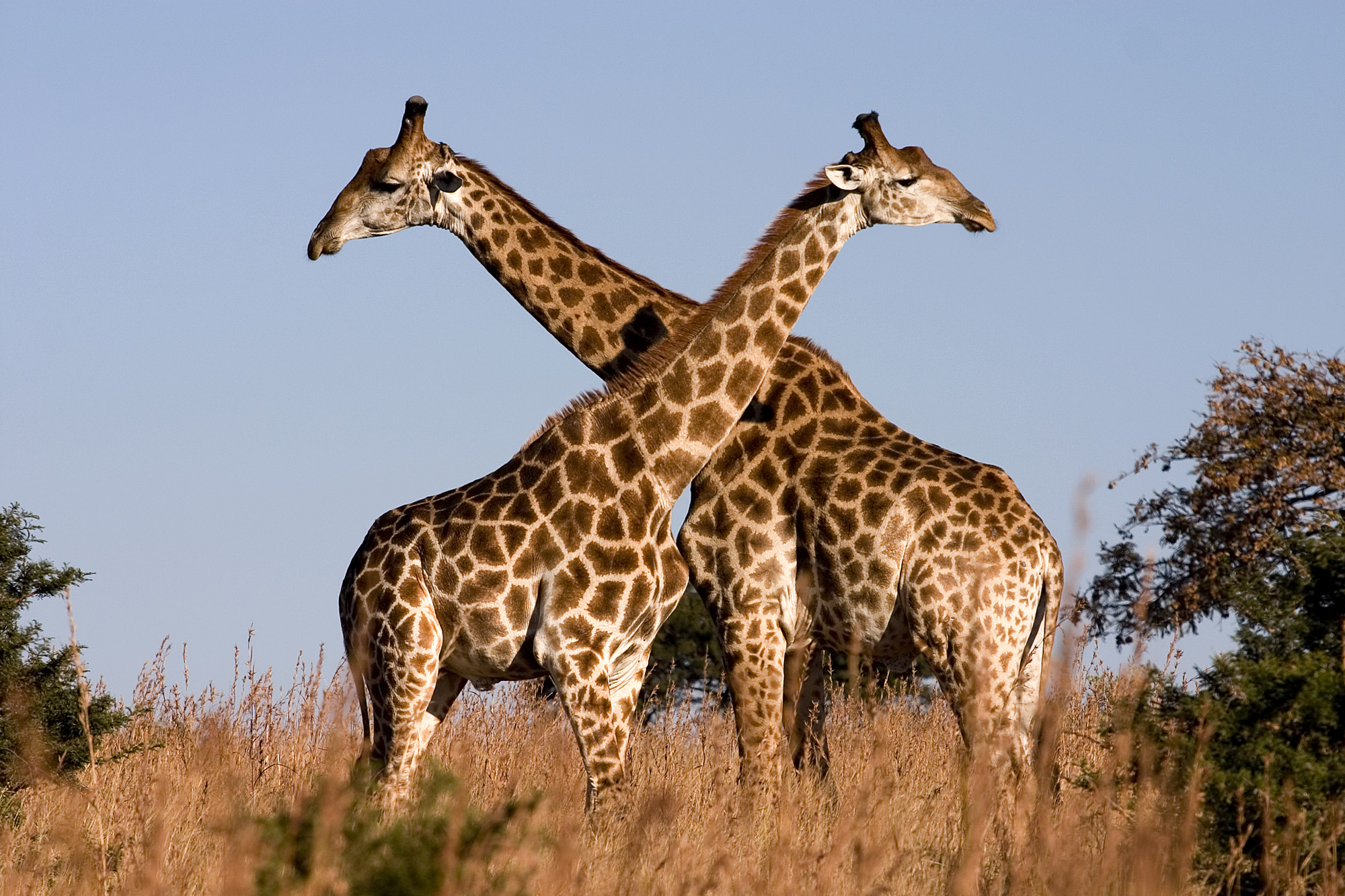
Here, male South African giraffes engage in low intensity necking to establish dominance, in Ithala Game Reserve, Kwa-Zulu-Natal, South Africa.

Male giraffes use their necks as weapons in combat, a behaviour known as "necking". Necking is used to establish dominance, and males that win necking bouts have greater reproductive success. This behaviour occurs at low or high intensity. In low-intensity necking, the combatants rub and lean on each other. The male that can keep itself more upright wins the bout. In high-intensity necking, the combatants will spread their front legs and swing their necks at each other, attempting to land blows with their ossicones. The contestants will try to dodge each other's blows and then prepare to counter. The power of a blow depends on the weight of the skull and the arc of the swing. A necking duel can last more than half an hour, depending on how well matched the combatants are. Although most fights do not lead to serious injury, there have been records of broken jaws, broken necks, and even deaths.

After a duel, it is common for two male giraffes to caress and court each other. Such interactions between males have been found to be more frequent than heterosexual coupling. In one study, up to 94 percent of observed mounting incidents took place between males. The proportion of same-sex activities varied from 30 to 75 percent. Only one percent of same-sex mounting incidents occurred between females.

=== Mortality and health ===
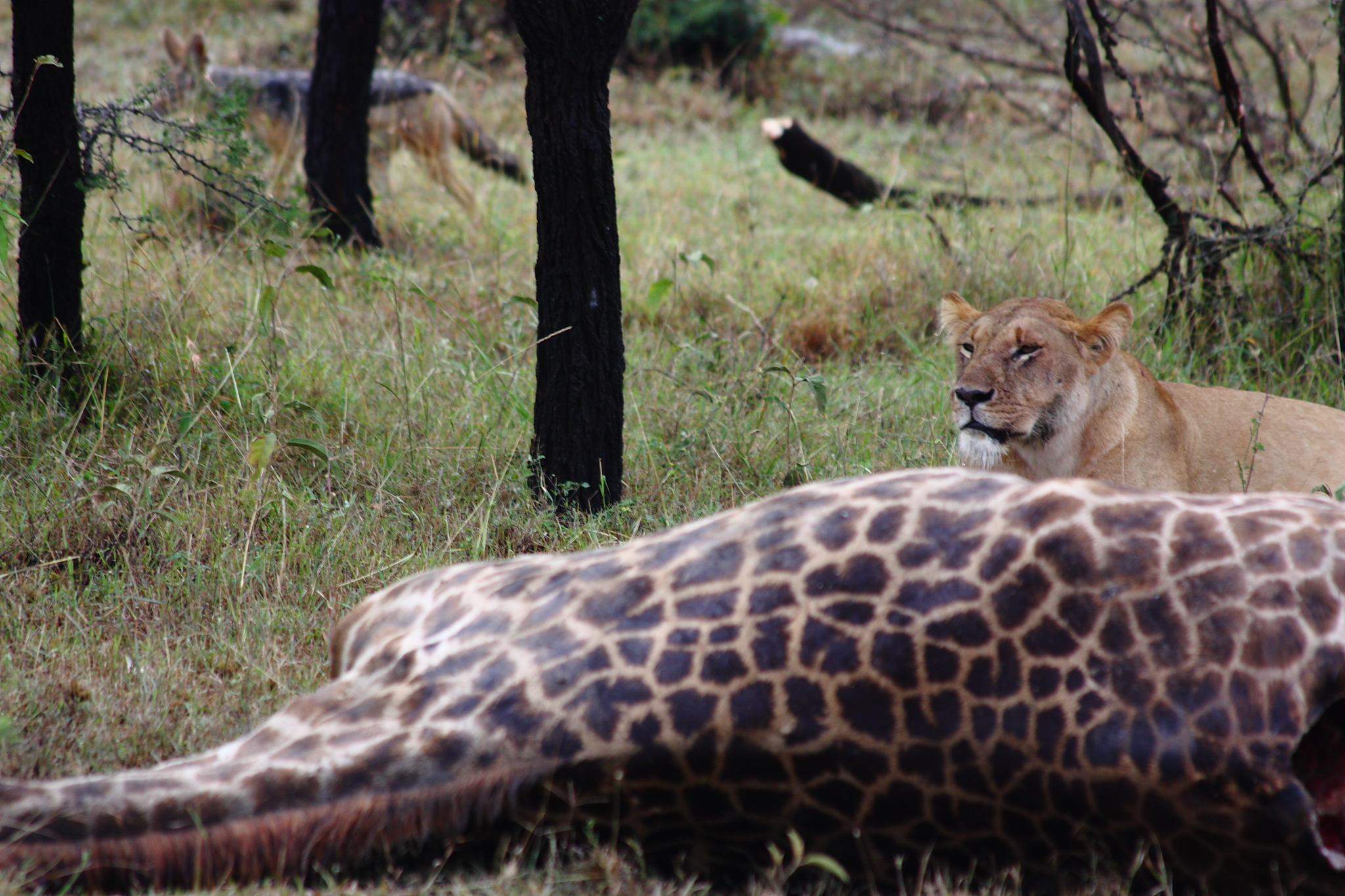
Lioness seen with an adult Masai giraffe kill

Giraffes have high adult survival probability, and an unusually long lifespan compared to other ruminants, up to 38 years. Adult female survival is significantly correlated with the number of social associations. Because of their size, eyesight and powerful kicks, adult giraffes are mostly safe from predation, with lions being their only major threats. Calves are much more vulnerable than adults and are also preyed on by leopards, spotted hyenas and wild dogs. A quarter to a half of giraffe calves reach adulthood. Calf survival varies according to the season of birth, with calves born during the dry season having higher survival rates.

The local, seasonal presence of large herds of migratory wildebeests and zebras reduces predation pressure on giraffe calves and increases their survival probability. In turn, it has been suggested that other hoofed mammals may benefit from associating with giraffes, as their height allows them to spot predators from further away. Zebras were found to assess predation risk by watching giraffes and spend less time looking around when giraffes are present.

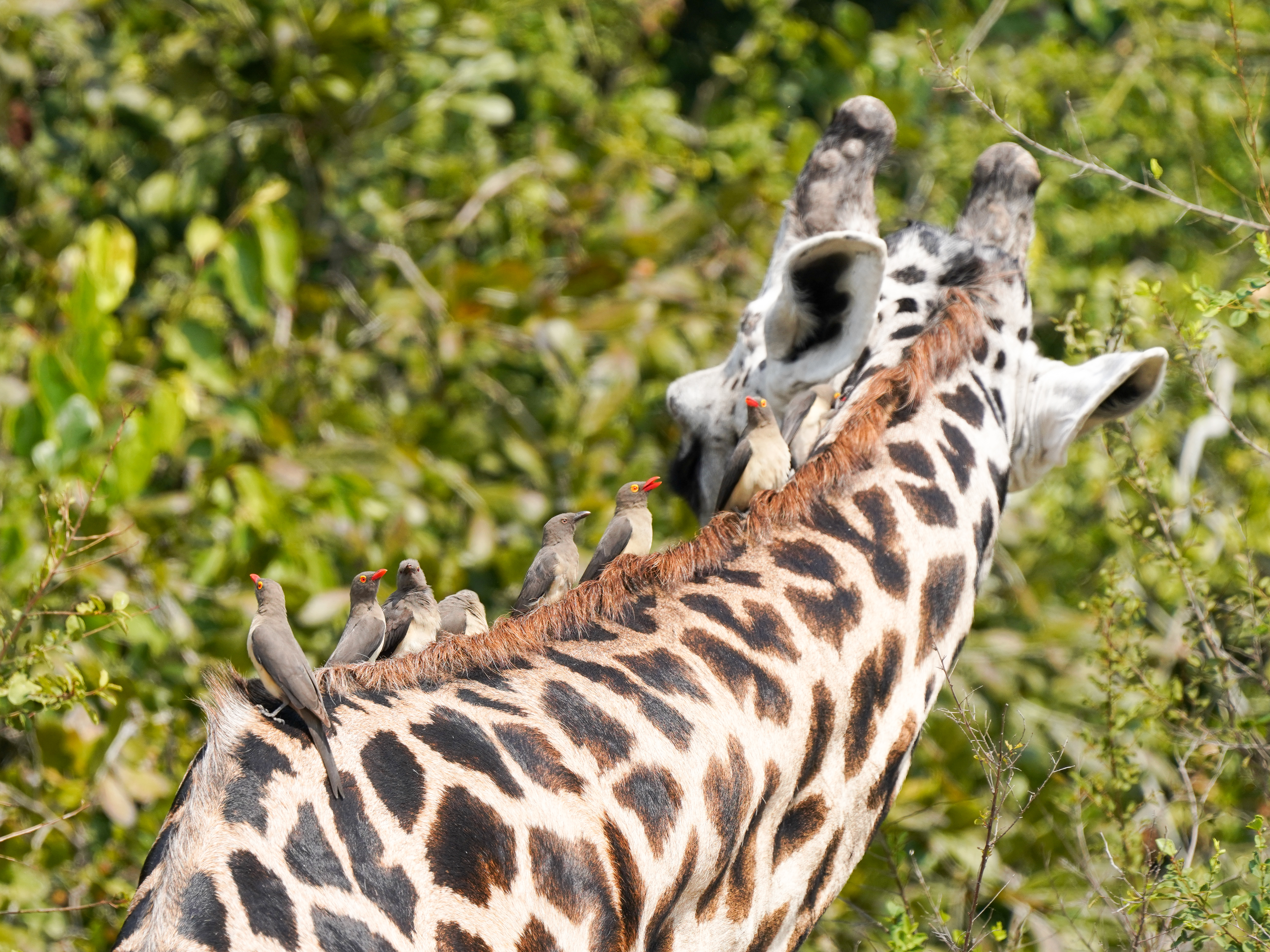
Red-billed oxpeckers on a giraffe, Zambia

Some parasites feed on giraffes. They are often hosts for ticks, especially in the area around the genitals, which have thinner skin than other areas. Tick species that commonly feed on giraffes are those of genera Hyalomma, Amblyomma and Rhipicephalus. Red-billed and yellow-billed oxpeckers clean giraffes of ticks and alert them to danger. Giraffes host numerous species of internal parasites and are susceptible to various diseases. They were victims of the (now eradicated) viral illness rinderpest. Giraffes can also suffer from a skin disorder, which comes in the form of wrinkles, lesions or raw fissures. As much as 79% of giraffes have symptoms of the disease in Ruaha National Park, but it did not cause mortality in Tarangire and is less prevalent in areas with fertile soils.

== Human relations ==
=== Cultural significance ===
With its lanky build and spotted coat, the giraffe has been a source of fascination throughout human history, and its image is widespread in culture. It has represented flexibility, far-sightedness, femininity, fragility, passivity, grace, beauty and the continent of Africa itself.

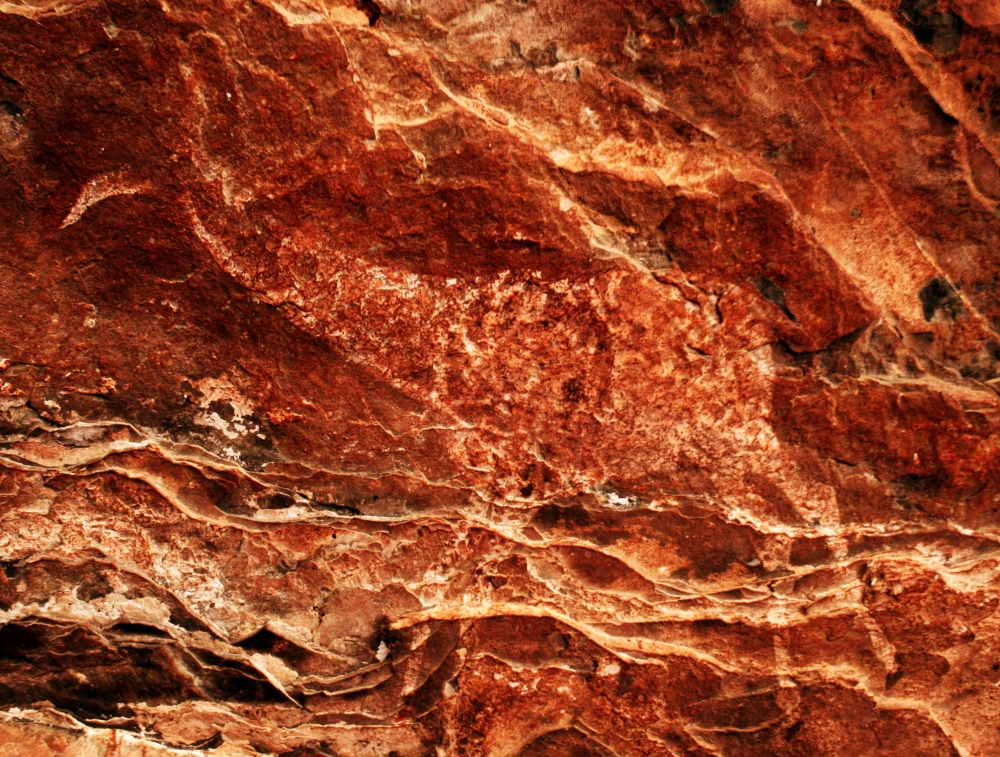
San rock art in Namibia depicting a giraffe

Giraffes were depicted in art throughout the African continent. The Kiffians were responsible for a life-size rock engraving of two giraffes, dated 8,000 years ago, that has been called the "world's largest rock art petroglyph". Judging from evidence including incised clay pots, archaeologists now believe that, in the ancient Kushite societies located in Nubia, or what is now northern Sudan, giraffes may have featured in popular religion and women's religion, though not in elite or royal religion, and may have also had a connection to beliefs about the sun. The Tugen people of modern Kenya used the giraffe to depict their god Mda. The Egyptians gave the giraffe its own hieroglyph; 'sr' in Old Egyptian and 'mmy' in later periods. How the giraffe got its height has been the subject of various African folktales.

Giraffes have a presence in modern Western culture. Salvador Dalí depicted them with burning manes in some surrealist paintings. Dali considered the giraffe to be a masculine symbol. A flaming giraffe was meant to be a "masculine cosmic apocalyptic monster". Several children's books feature the giraffe, including David A. Ufer's The Giraffe Who Was Afraid of Heights, Giles Andreae's Giraffes Can't Dance and Roald Dahl's The Giraffe and the Pelly and Me. Giraffes have appeared in animated films as minor characters in Disney's Dumbo and The Lion King, and in more prominent roles in The Wild and the Madagascar films. Sophie the Giraffe has been a popular teether since 1961. Another famous fictional giraffe is the Toys "R" Us mascot Geoffrey the Giraffe.

The giraffe has also been used for some scientific experiments and discoveries. Scientists have used the properties of giraffe skin as a model for astronaut and fighter pilot suits because the people in these professions are in danger of passing out if blood rushes to their legs. Computer scientists have modeled the coat patterns of several subspecies using reaction–diffusion mechanisms. The constellation of Camelopardalis, introduced in the 17th century, depicts a giraffe. The Tswana people of Botswana traditionally see the constellation Crux as two giraffes—Acrux and Mimosa forming a male, and Gacrux and Delta Crucis forming the female.

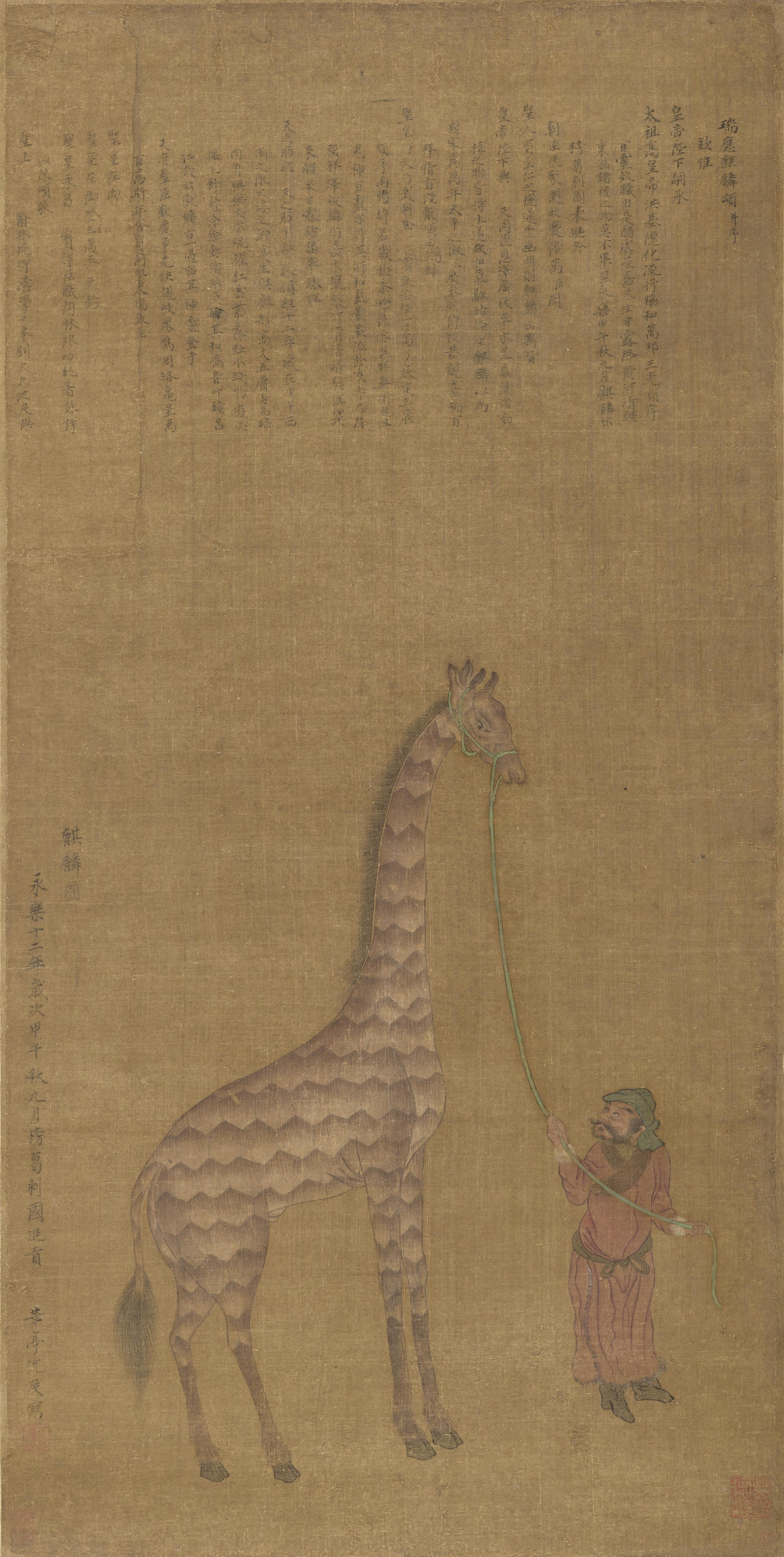
Painting of a giraffe imported to China during the Ming dynasty, in which it was identified with the mythological Qilin

=== Captivity ===
The Egyptians were among the earliest people to keep giraffes in captivity and shipped them around the Mediterranean. The giraffe was among the many animals collected and displayed by the Romans. The first one in Rome was brought in by Julius Caesar in 46 BC. With the fall of the Western Roman Empire, the housing of giraffes in Europe declined. During the Middle Ages, giraffes were known to Europeans through contact with the Arabs, who revered the giraffe for its peculiar appearance.

Individual captive giraffes were given celebrity status throughout history. In 1414, a giraffe from Malindi was taken to China by explorer Zheng He and placed in a Ming dynasty zoo. The animal was a source of fascination for the Chinese people, who associated it with the mythical Qilin. The Medici giraffe was a giraffe presented to Lorenzo de' Medici in 1486. It caused a great stir on its arrival in Florence. Zarafa, another famous giraffe, was brought from Egypt to Paris in the early 19th century as a gift for Charles X of France. A sensation, the giraffe was the subject of numerous memorabilia or "giraffanalia".

Giraffes have become popular attractions in modern zoos, though keeping them is difficult as they prefer large areas and need to eat large amounts of browse. Captive giraffes in North America and Europe appear to have a higher mortality rate than in the wild, the most common causes being poor husbandry, nutrition, and management. Giraffes in zoos display stereotypical behaviours, particularly the licking of inanimate objects and pacing. Zookeepers may offer various activities to stimulate giraffes, including training them to take food from visitors. Stables for giraffes are built particularly high to accommodate their height.

=== Exploitation ===
Giraffes were probably common targets for hunters throughout Africa. Different parts of their bodies were used for different purposes. Their meat was used for food. The tail hairs were used for flyswatters, bracelets, necklaces, and threads. Shields, sandals, and drums were made using the skin, and the strings of musical instruments were made from the tendons. In Buganda, the smoke of burning giraffe skin was traditionally used to treat nosebleeds. The Humr people of Kordofan consume the drink Umm Nyolokh, which is prepared from the liver and bone marrow of giraffes. Richard Rudgley hypothesised that Umm Nyolokh might contain DMT. The drink is said to cause hallucinations of giraffes, believed to be the giraffes' ghosts, by the Humr.

== Conservation status ==
In 2016, giraffes were assessed as Vulnerable from a conservation perspective by the International Union for Conservation of Nature (IUCN). In 1985, it was estimated there were 155,000 giraffes in the wild. This declined to over 140,000 in 1999. Estimates as of 2016 indicate there are approximately 97,500 members of Giraffa in the wild. The Masai and reticulated subspecies are endangered, and the Rothschild subspecies is near threatened. The Nubian subspecies is critically endangered. In 2025, the IUCN accepted four species of giraffe with seven subspecies.

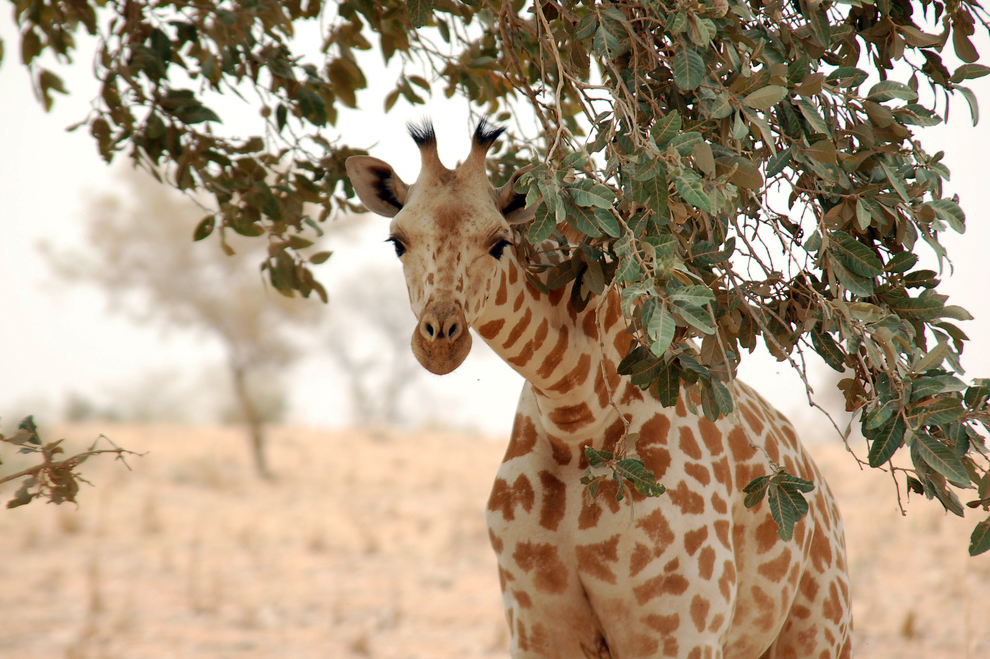
Endangered West African giraffe near Koure, Niger

The primary causes for giraffe population declines are habitat loss and direct killing for bushmeat markets. Giraffes have been extirpated from much of their historic range, including Eritrea, Guinea, Mauritania and Senegal. They may also have disappeared from Angola, Mali, and Nigeria, but have been introduced to Rwanda and Eswatini. As of 2010, there were more than 1,600 in captivity at Species360-registered zoos. Habitat destruction has hurt the giraffe. In the Sahel, the need for firewood and grazing room for livestock has led to deforestation. Normally, giraffes can coexist with livestock, since they avoid direct competition by feeding above them. In 2017, severe droughts in northern Kenya led to increased tensions over land and the killing of wildlife by herders, with giraffe populations being particularly hit.

Protected areas like national parks provide important habitat and anti-poaching protection to giraffe populations. Community-based conservation efforts outside national parks are also effective at protecting giraffes and their habitats. Private game reserves have contributed to the preservation of giraffe populations in eastern and southern Africa. The giraffe is a protected species in most of its range. It is the national animal of Tanzania, and is protected by law, and unauthorised killing can result in imprisonment. The UN-backed Convention of Migratory Species selected giraffes for protection in 2017. In 2019, giraffes were listed under Appendix II of the Convention on International Trade in Endangered Species (CITES), which means international trade including in parts/derivatives is regulated.

Translocations are sometimes used to augment or re-establish diminished or extirpated populations, but these activities are risky and difficult to undertake using the best practices of extensive pre- and post-translocation studies and ensuring a viable founding population. Aerial survey is the most common method of monitoring giraffe population trends in the vast roadless tracts of African landscapes, but aerial methods are known to undercount giraffes. Ground-based survey methods are more accurate and can be used in conjunction with aerial surveys to make accurate estimates of population sizes and trends.

== See also ==
- Fauna of Africa
- Giraffe Centre
- Giraffe Manor - hotel in Nairobi with giraffes
