= Jorge Morales =

Spanish vertebrate palaeontologist

- Known for: Cenozoic palaeomammalogy
- Scientific career
- Fields: Vertebrate palaeontology

Jorge Morales is a Spanish vertebrate palaeontologist.

== Research ==
He is best known for his work on the Cenozoic mammal faunas of Africa, in particular his focus on the clades Ferae and Ruminantia. He has conducted work at sites in Niger, Kenya, Uganda, Namibia, and South Africa. After having extensively studied Eurasian members of Ferae and Ruminantia, Morales worked closely with fellow palaeontologists María Dolores Soria Mayor, Brigitte Senut, Martin Pickford, and Dominique Gommery in studying the Miocene faunas of the Sperrgebiet in Namibia in the 1990s. Following Soria's death, Morales accompanied Senut and Pickford in expeditions to eastern Africa to uncover and study their fossil mammals in the 2000s.

Below is a list of taxa that Morales has contributed to naming:

Year	Taxon	Authors
2026	Paludocyon moyasolai sp. nov.	Morales, Abella, Valenciano, Gamarra, Robles, Gregori, Alba, & Casanovas-Vilar
2019	Izmirictis cani gen. et sp. nov.	Morales, Mayda, Valenciano, DeMiguel, & Kaya
2018	Orycterochoerus alferezi gen. et sp. nov.	Pickford & Morales
2011	Mioparadoxurus meini gen. et sp. nov.	Morales & Pickford
2003	Listriodon retamaensis sp. nov.	Pickford & Morales
1999	Sperrgebietomeryx wardi gen. et sp. nov.	Morales, Soria, & Pickford
1999	Orangemeryx hendeyi gen. et sp. nov.	Morales, Soria, & Pickford
1998	Lorancahyus daamsi sp. nov.	Pickford & Morales
1998	Lorancahyus hypsorhizus gen. et sp. nov.	Pickford & Morales
1995	Namibiomeryx senuti gen. et sp. nov.	Morales, Soria, & Pickford
