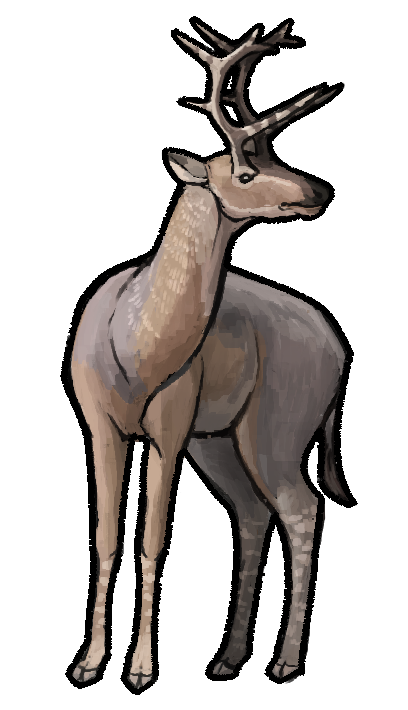
- Restoration of Climacoceras gentryi

Scientific classification
- Kingdom: Animalia
- Phylum: Chordata
- Class: Mammalia
- Order: Artiodactyla
- Family: †Climacoceratidae
- Genus: †Climacoceras; MacInnes, 1936

Species
- C. africanus (type) MacInnes, 1936; C. gentryi Hamilton, 1978

= Climacoceras =

Climacoceras Temporal range: Miocene

Extinct genus of mammals

Climacoceras (from Greek for "ladder horns") is a genus of extinct artiodactyl ungulates that lived in Africa and Europe during the Miocene. The members of Climacoceras were related to giraffes, and the genus was formerly placed within the Giraffidae, but is now placed in the Climacoceratidae, a sister group within the superfamily Giraffoidea. Fossils of the two best known species of Climacoceras, C. africanus and C. gentryi, have both been found in Kenya. The animals measured about 1.5 m (4.9 ft) tall and had large ossicones resembling antlers. C. africanus had ossicones resembling tall, thorn-covered plant stems, while the ossicones of C. gentryi resembled thorny crescents.

The genus was once placed within Palaeomerycidae, then Giraffidae. It is now considered a giraffoid in the family Climacoceratidae, erected by Hamilton.

Other Climacoceratidae genera include Prolibytherium from Egypt and Libya and Orangemeryx from Namibia and South Africa.
