= Martin Pickford =

English Palaeontologist

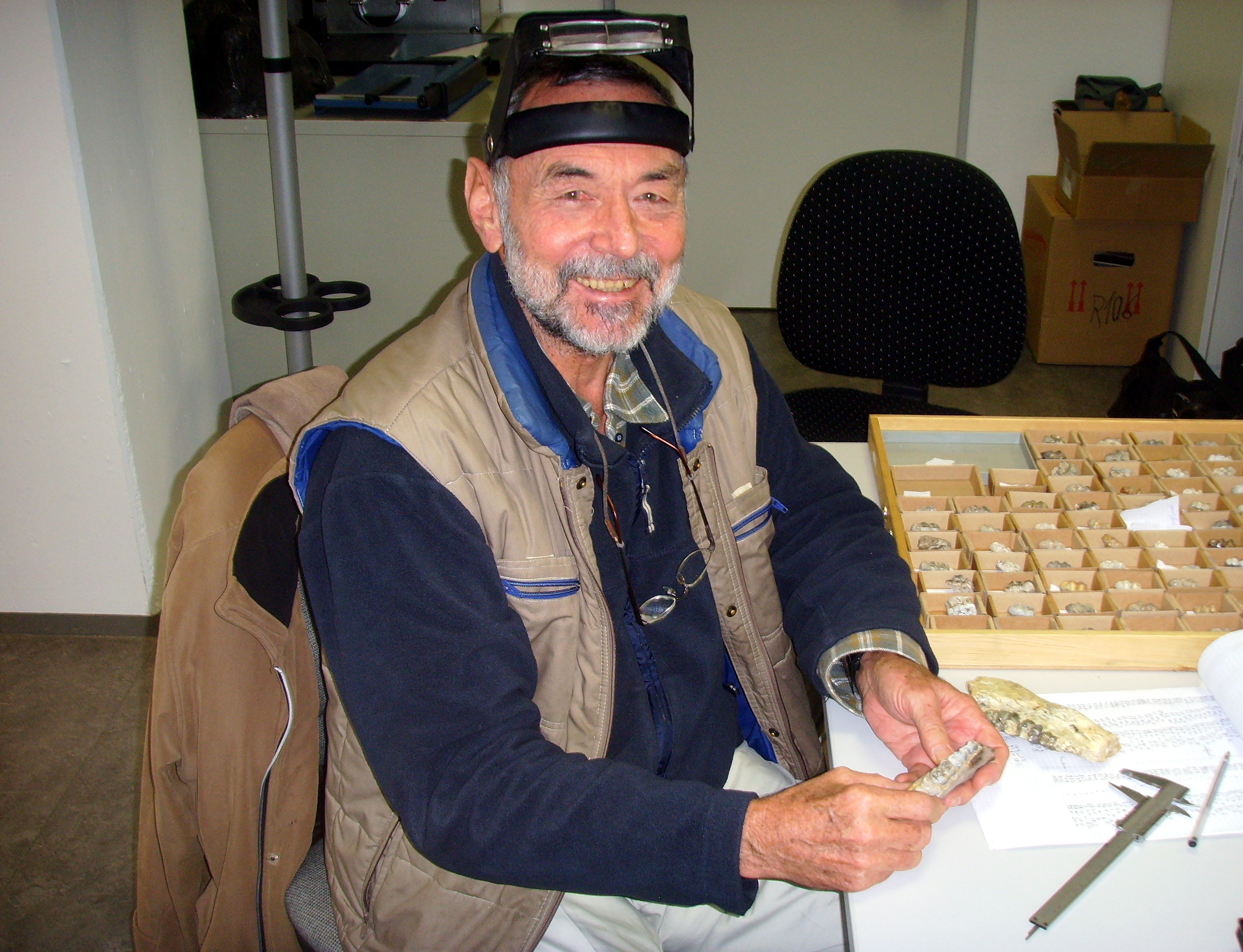
- Martin Pickford, 2011 at Naturmuseum Senckenberg (Frankfurt am Main, Germany), identifying fossil teeth of Suidae from Indonesia, excavated from the stratum of Homo erectus from Sangiran
- Born: 1943 (age 82–83); Wiltshire, England, United Kingdom
- Citizenship: Kenyan
- Education: Dalhousie University (Bachelor's), University of London (PhD)
- Known for: discovery of Orrorin tugenensis (2001)
- Scientific career
- Workplaces: Uganda Paleontology Expedition, Collège de France, Muséum national d'histoire naturelle, National Museums of Kenya, University of Mainz
- Thesis: Stratigraphy and Palaeoecology of Five Late Cainozoic Formations in the Kenya Rift Valley (1974)

Martin Pickford (born 1943) is a lecturer in the Chair of Paleoanthropology and Prehistory at the Collège de France and honorary affiliate at the Département Histoire de la Terre in the Muséum national d'Histoire. In 2001, Martin Pickford together with Brigitte Senut and their team discovered Orrorin tugenensis, a hominid primate species dated between 5.8 and 6.2 million years ago and a potential ancestor of the genus Australopithecus.

== Biographical details ==
Pickford was born in 1943 in Wiltshire, England. He is the 4th child of Austin Joseph Pickford and Eleanor Margery Pickford née Holman. The family moved to Kenya in 1946. He read for his first degree between 1967 and 1971 in Dalhousie University and took a PhD at the University of London in 1975. Between 1978 and 2003 he worked at Kenya National Museums at the Muséum National d'Histoire Naturelle, Paris and as a Fellow at the University of Mainz, Germany and has since held various visiting professorships.

== Research in Africa ==
At the time of the discovery of Orrorin, researchers wishing to carry out palaeontological research in Kenya were required to be affiliated with an officially sanctioned Kenyan research organisation. Prior to 1993 the only institution with this privilege was the Kenya National Museums, in which Pickford was Head of the Department of Sites and Monuments from 1978 to 1984. As such the museum and its director used to enjoy a monopoly on palaeontological research in Kenya. However, 7 years before the discovery of Orrorin in 2000, following intense pressure from the international community, the Kenyan Government liberalised many facets of the political, economic and bureaucratic life of the country, and this included the monopoly on the country's palaeontological and archaeological resources that the National Museums of Kenya and its director Richard Leakey had previously enjoyed, both prior to, and following, the country's independence in 1963.

In 1984, Pickford was congratulated in writing by the then director of the National Museums of Kenya Richard Leakey, with whom Pickford had attended high school in Nairobi, for completing three two-year contracts at the museum. Leakey informed Pickford that it was not possible to renew the contract a fourth time, as at that time there was a government-set limit placed on the quantity of such renewals. Pickford then settled in France, and in 1985, after contacting the Uganda Government, he launched the Uganda Paleontology Expedition.

From 1971 to 1978 Pickford had carried out extensive research in the Tugen Hills under a permit issued by the Kenyan Office of the President. During the surveys Pickford and his team found many important fossils ranging in age from 15 million to 2 million years old. In 1974 he found the first hominid fossil from the 6-million-year-old Lukeino Formation (published in Nature in 1975), a lower molar, which is today included in the hypodigm of Orrorin tugenensis. He also named Orrorin praegens in 2022.

Below is a list of taxa that Pickford has contributed to naming:

Year	Taxon	Authors
2022	Afrillonura namibensis gen. et sp. nov.	Rosina & Pickford
2019	Eteketoni platycephalus gen. et sp. nov.	Pickford
2019	Nanogale fragilis gen. et sp. nov.	Pickford
2019	Damarachloris primaevus gen. et sp. nov.	Pickford
2018	Promicrogale namibiensis gen. et sp. nov.	Pickford
2018	Orycterochoerus alferezi gen. et sp. nov.	Pickford & Morales
2015	Namapsitta praeruptorum gen. et sp. nov.	Mourer-Chauviré, Pickford, & Senut
2015	Scopelortyx klinghardtensis gen. et sp. nov.	Mourer-Chauviré, Pickford, & Senut
2014	Retroporcus complutensis sp. nov.	Pickford & Laurent
2011	Rusingapedetes tsujikawai gen. et sp. nov.	Pickford & Mein
2011	Mioparadoxurus meini gen. et sp. nov.	Morales & Pickford
2003	Listriodon retamaensis sp. nov.	Pickford & Morales
2001	Orrorin tugenensis gen. et sp. nov.	Senut, Pickford, Gommery, Mein, Cheboi, & Coppens
1999	Sperrgebietomeryx wardi gen. et sp. nov.	Morales, Soria, & Pickford
1999	Orangemeryx hendeyi gen. et sp. nov.	Morales, Soria, & Pickford
1998	Lorancahyus daamsi sp. nov.	Pickford & Morales
1998	Lorancahyus hypsorhizus gen. et sp. nov.	Pickford & Morales
1997	Samburupithecus kiptalami gen. et sp. nov.	Ishida & Pickford
1995	Namibiomeryx senuti gen. et sp. nov.	Morales, Soria, & Pickford
1992	Otavipithecus namibiensis gen. et sp. nov.	Conroy, Pickford, Senut, Van Couvering, & Mein
1983	Kenyapotamus ternani sp. nov.	Pickford
1983	Kenyapotamus coryndoni gen. et sp. nov.	Pickford

== Selected publications ==
- Senut, B., Pickford, M., Gommery, D., Mein, P., Cheboi, K., & Coppens, Y. (20 January 2001). "First hominid from the Miocene (Lukeino Formation, Kenya)". Comptes Rendus Académie des Sciences Paris, Série IIA Sciences de la Terre et des Planètes, 332, 137–144.
- Pickford, M. (30 January 2001). "The geological and faunal context of Late Miocene hominid remains from Lukeino, KenyaContexte géologique et faunique des restes d'hominidés du Miocène supérieur de Lukeino, Kenya". Comptes Rendus Académie des Sciences Paris, Série IIA Sciences de la Terre et des Planètes, 332, 2, 145–152.
- Pickford, M. (1997). Louis B. Leakey: Beyond the evidence. London: Janus Pub. Co.

== Sources ==
- http://www.nature.com/nature/journal/v410/n6828/full/410508a0.html
- "Orrorin tugenesis". 16 September 2001. Archived from the original on 19 January 2006.
- Regal, Brian (2004). Human evolution: A guide to the debates. Santa Barbara, California, USA: ABC-CLIO.
