= Tsaidamotherium =

Tsaidamotherium Temporal range: Late Miocene

Scientific classification
- Kingdom: Animalia
- Phylum: Chordata
- Class: Mammalia
- Order: Artiodactyla
- Family: Bovidae
- Subfamily: Caprinae
- Tribe: Ovibovini
- Genus: †Tsaidamotherium; Bohlin, 1935

Type species
- †Tsaidamotherium hedini Bohlin, 1935

Species
- T. hedini; T. brevirostrum Shi, 2013

Extinct genus of mammals

Tsaidamotherium is an extinct genus of Late Miocene ovibovinid caprine from the Tibetan Plateau of Northwestern China. Both known species are extremely unusual in that the horns are of unequal sizes: the left horn core is several times smaller than the right horn core. Although it is originally considered that it belongs to the tribe Ovibovini, close to the muskox, Ovibos moschatus, a study in 2022 posits Tsaidamotherium as a giraffoidean genus in the family Prolibytheriidae together with Prolibytherium and Discokeryx.

== Etymology ==
The generic name refers to the Qaidam Basin, the region where the holotype of the type species, T. hedini was found. The specific name "hedini" honors Dr Sven Hedin. The specific name "brevirostrum" refers to the short muzzle of T. brevirostrum's holotype skull.

== Species ==
So far, there are two known species, T. hedini, and T. brevirostrum. The scrappy remains of the first species, T. hedini, were discovered by Dr Hedin at the Qaidam Basin during the Sino-Swedish Scientific Expedition to Northwest China during the 1930s. Partial remains of two individuals were discovered in the Liushu Formation within the Linxia Basin in Hezheng County, Gansu, in 2004, and were described as T. brevirostrum in 2013.

== Paleobiology ==
The skulls of both species had large nasal cavities, suggesting the living animals had broad, vaulted muzzles like those of the takin or Saiga antelope. The right horn core of T. hedini is tall and conical, suggesting the right horn would have resembled a Phrygian cap. In T. brevirostrum, the right horn corn is much shorter and flatter, suggesting the right horn would have appeared squashed or flattened in comparison.

== Paleoecology ==
During the late Miocene, the remains of the fossil horse Hipparion suggests that the Linxia and Qaidam basins were hot and semi-arid savanna environments. However, the anatomy of Tsaidamotherium (the vaulted muzzle, in particular), though, suggests that the living animals lived in comparatively cold environments. It is probable that the living animals had adapted to living in mountainous areas that had formed during a phase of tectonic uplift in Northwestern China at the beginning of the Late Miocene.
