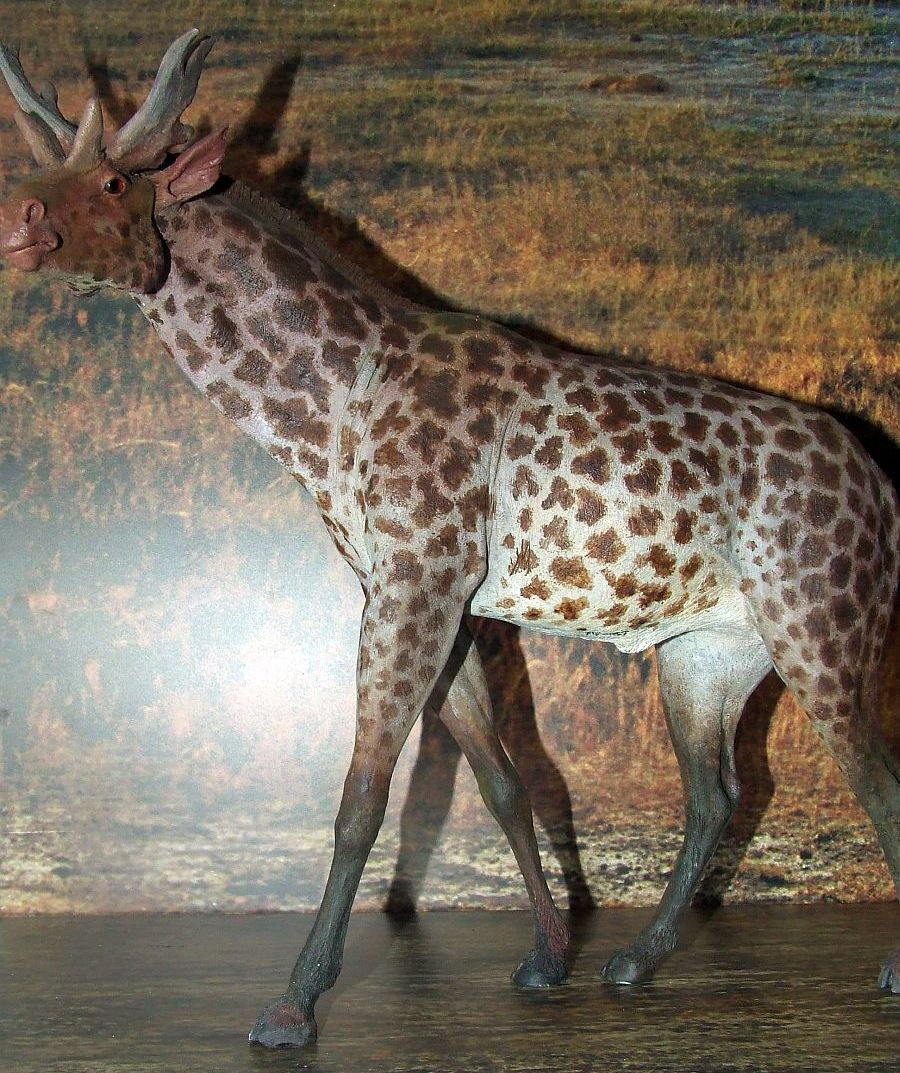
- Reconstruction of Sivatherium

Scientific classification
- Kingdom: Animalia
- Phylum: Chordata
- Class: Mammalia
- Order: Artiodactyla
- Clade: Giraffomorpha
- Superfamily: Giraffoidea; Gray, 1821

Families
- †Climacoceratidae; †Prolibytheriidae; Giraffidae

= Giraffoidea =

Giraffoidea Temporal range: Early Miocene–Holocene

Superfamily of mammals

Giraffoidea is a superfamily that includes the families Climacoceratidae, Prolibytheriidae, and Giraffidae. The only extant members in the superfamily are the giraffes and okapi. The Climacoceratidae are also placed in the superfamily, but were originally placed within the family Palaeomerycidae.

== Classification ==
- Superfamily Giraffoidea
  - Family † Climacoceratidae
    - †Climacoceras
    - †Orangemeryx
    - †Propalaeoryx
    - †Nyanzameryx
    - †Sperrgebietomeryx
  - Family † Prolibytheriidae
    - †Discokeryx
    - †Prolibytherium
    - †Tsaidamotherium?
  - Family Giraffidae
    - †Canthumeryx
    - †Georgiomeryx
    - †Shansitherium
    - Subfamily Sivatheriinae
      - †Bramatherium
      - †Decennatherium
      - †Helladotherium
      - †Sivatherium
    - Subfamily Giraffinae
      - Tribe Giraffini
        - †Bohlinia
        - Giraffa
        - †Honanotherium
        - †Mitilanotherium
      - Tribe Palaeotragini
        - Subtribe Palaeotragina
          - †Giraffokeryx
          - †Palaeotragus
          - †Samotherium
        - Subtribe Okapiina
          - Okapia
