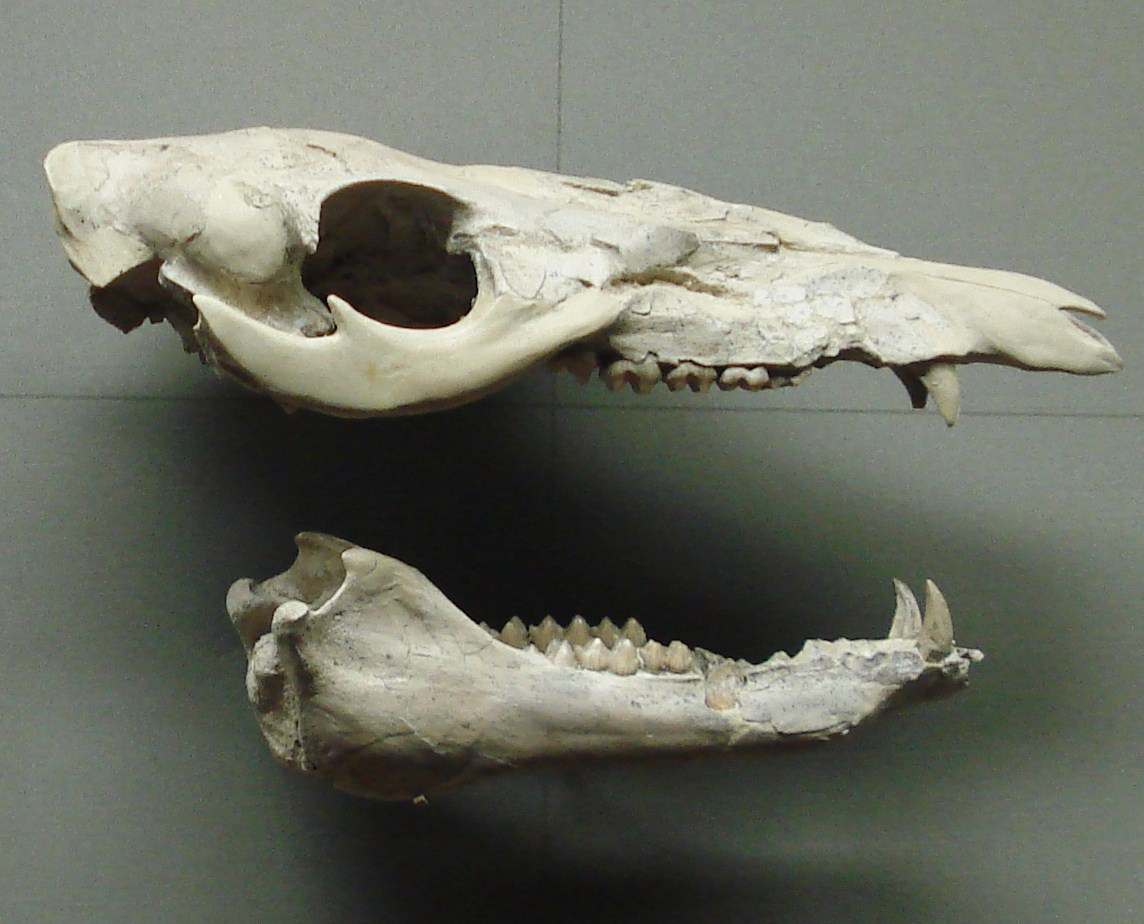
- Skull material of Taucanamo pygmaeum.

Scientific classification
- Kingdom: Animalia
- Phylum: Chordata
- Class: Mammalia
- Order: Artiodactyla
- Suborder: Suina
- Family: †Doliochoeridae; Simpson, 1945

Subfamilies and genera
- †Doliochoerinae Simpson, 1945; †Barberahyus; †Doliochoerus; †Pecarichoerus; †Taucanamo; †Orycterochoerinae Pickford & Morales, 2018; †Bransatochoerus; †Lorancahyus; †Orycterochoerus

= Doliochoeridae =

Doliochoeridae Temporal range: Early Oligocene–Late Miocene

Extinct family of mammals

Doliochoeridae is an extinct family of suoid artiodactyl ungulates that were once widely distributed in Eurasia and Africa from the Early Oligocene to the Late Miocene. Often referred in the past as Old World peccaries, the doliochoerids are now considered to be a distinct family of suoids separate from true peccaries.
