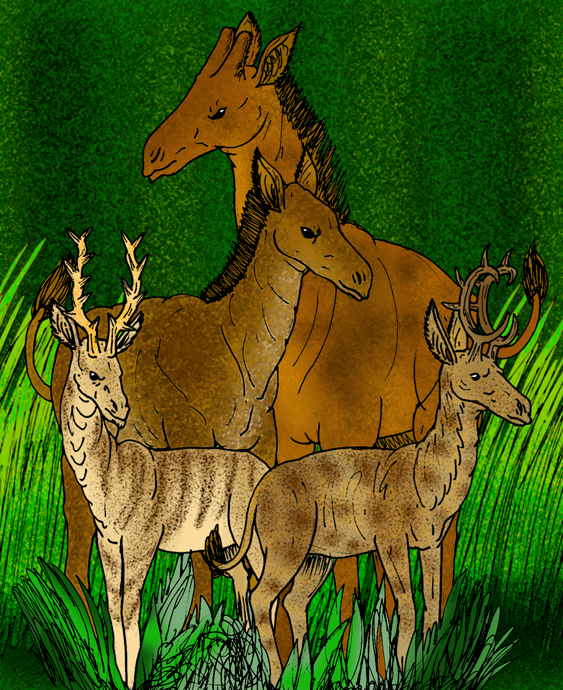
- Climacoceras africanus (left foreground), and C. gentryi (right foreground), with Palaeotragus primeavus (left background), and P. germaini (right background)

Scientific classification
- Kingdom: Animalia
- Phylum: Chordata
- Class: Mammalia
- Order: Artiodactyla
- Superfamily: Giraffoidea
- Family: †Climacoceratidae; Hamilton, 1978

Genera
- Climacoceras MacInnes, 1936; Nyanzameryx; Orangemeryx; Propalaeoryx; Sperrgebietomeryx

= Climacoceratidae =

Climacoceratidae Temporal range: Miocene

Extinct family of mammals

Climacoceratidae is a family of superficially deer-like artiodactyl ungulates which lived in the Miocene epoch in Africa. They are close to the ancestry of giraffes, with some genera, such as Prolibytherium, originally classified as giraffes, but later found to have been of entirely different families.

The climacoceratids, namely members of what is now the type genus Climacoceras, were originally placed within the family Palaeomerycidae, and then within Giraffidae. In 1978, W. R. Hamilton erected a new family, placing it close to Giraffidae within the superfamily Giraffoidea.

They differ from giraffes in that their antler-like ossicones are derived from different bones.
