= Afrillonura =

Afrillonura Temporal range: Middle Miocene

Scientific classification
- Kingdom: Animalia
- Phylum: Chordata
- Class: Mammalia
- Order: Chiroptera
- Family: Emballonuridae
- Genus: †Afrillonura
- Species: †A. namibensis

Binomial name
- †Afrillonura namibensis Rosina & Pickford, 2022

Extinct genus of bats

Afrillonura is an extinct genus of emballonurid that inhabited Namibia during the Middle Miocene. It contains the species A. namibensis.
