= Promicrogale =

Promicrogale Temporal range: Aquitanian

Scientific classification
- Kingdom: Animalia
- Phylum: Chordata
- Class: Mammalia
- Order: Afrosoricida
- Suborder: Tenrecomorpha
- Family: Tenrecidae
- Genus: †Promicrogale
- Species: †P. namibiensis

Binomial name
- †Promicrogale namibiensis Pickford, 2018

Extinct genus of afrotherian

Promicrogale is an extinct monotypic genus of tenrec that lived in what is now Namibia during the Aquitanian stage of the Miocene epoch.

== Description ==
Promicrogale namibiensis, the type species, is distinguished from its relatives by its longer retromolar space in the mandible relative to Microgale. It differs from Micropotamogale in having relatively short talonids, a short gap between its second and third mandibular premolars, no gap between its mandibular canine and second premolar, and its bicuspid lower canine.
