= Orycterochoerus =

Orycterochoerus Temporal range: Early Miocene

Scientific classification
- Kingdom: Animalia
- Phylum: Chordata
- Class: Mammalia
- Order: Artiodactyla
- Family: †Doliochoeridae
- Genus: †Orycterochoerus (Pickford & Morales, 2018)
- Species: †O. alferezi

Binomial name
- †Orycterochoerus alferezi Pickford & Morales, 2018

Extinct genus of mammals

Orycterochoerus is an extinct genus of artiodactyl that inhabited Spain during the Early Miocene. It contains a single species, O. alferezi.
