= Propalaeoryx =

Scientific classification
- Kingdom: Animalia
- Phylum: Chordata
- Class: Mammalia
- Order: Artiodactyla
- Family: †Climacoceratidae
- Genus: †Propalaeoryx; Stromer, 1926

Extinct genus of African Giraffomorpha

Propalaeoryx is an extinct genus of African Giraffomorpha with two species currently known being Propalaeoryx austrofricanus and Propalaeoryx nyanae, both living in Namibia during the early Miocene epoch.
