= Sperrgebietomeryx =

Scientific classification
- Kingdom: Animalia
- Phylum: Chordata
- Class: Mammalia
- Order: Artiodactyla
- Family: †Climacoceratidae
- Genus: †Sperrgebietomeryx; Morales et al. 1999

Type species
- Sperrgebietomeryx wardi Morales et al. 1999

Genus of fossil mammals

Sperrgebietomeryx is a genus of giraffoid ruminants that lived during the early and middle Miocene epoch during the Cenozoic era in Namibia about 23.03 million to 15.97 million years ago.
