= Namibiomeryx =

Namibiomeryx Temporal range: Early Miocene

Scientific classification
- Kingdom: Animalia
- Phylum: Chordata
- Class: Mammalia
- Order: Artiodactyla
- Family: Bovidae
- Genus: †Namibiomeryx
- Species: †N. senuti

Binomial name
- †Namibiomeryx senuti Morales et al., 1995

Extinct genus of bovid

Namibiomeryx is an extinct monotypic genus of bovid that lived in Southwestern Africa during the Early Miocene subepoch.

== Etymology ==
The generic name Namibiomeryx derives from the name of the country of Namibia and the Greek word for ruminant, meryx. The specific epithet of the type species, Namibiomeryx senuti, honours the palaeontologist Brigitte Senut.
