= Lorancahyus =

Lorancahyus Temporal range: Early Miocene

Scientific classification
- Kingdom: Animalia
- Phylum: Chordata
- Class: Mammalia
- Order: Artiodactyla
- Family: Tayassuidae
- Genus: †Lorancahyus; Pickford and Morales, 1998

Type species
- Lorancahyus hypsorhizus Pickford and Morales, 1998

Species
- Lorancahyus daamsi Pickford and Morales, 1998

Extinct genus of tayassuid mammal

Lorancahyus is an extinct genus of tayassuid ungulate that lived in Europe during the Early Miocene subepoch.

== Etymology ==
The generic name Lorancahyus is named after Loranca, the type locality for the genus, and the Greek word hyus, meaning pig. The specific epithet of the type species, Lorancahyus hypsorhizus, means "tall root" and is derived from the Greek word hypsos for tall and the Latin word rhizus for root. The specific epithet of the species Lorancahyus daamsi honours Remmert Daams, the discoverer of the Moheda site, which is the type locality for that species.
