= María Dolores Soria Mayor =

Spanish paleontologist

- Born: 1948
- Died: 5 June 2004 (aged 55–56)
- Other name: Loli Soria
- Occupations: Paleontologist, researcher, university professor, biologist

Academic background
- Doctoral advisor: Emiliano Aguirre

Academic work
- Institutions: Spanish National Research Council; National Museum of Natural Sciences; Higher University of San Andrés

María Dolores Soria Mayor (1948 – 5 June 2004), also known as Loli Soria, was a Spanish paleontologist.

== Biography ==
María Dolores Soria Mayor earned a degree in Biological Sciences in 1971, and until 1973 she was a professor of Natural Sciences at the Corazón de María school in Ciudad Lineal. In 1973 and 1974 she studied and worked in Germany, and after her return she began her thesis on the canid Nyctereutes, found in the karst field of Layna. At that time she also published about another species of that site, the rodent Blancomys neglectus.

She was hired as a Spanish National Research Council (CSIC) collaborator in 1974, and in 1981 she obtained the position of Senior Scientist at the National Museum of Natural Sciences, where she was head of the Department of Paleobiology from 1996 to 2001.

In 1974 she contributed to the international conference on Continental Biostratigraphy of the Upper Neogene and Lower Quaternary. The following year she participated in the 6th Congress of the Regional Committee of Stratigraphy of the Neogene Mediterranean, in Bratislava. She was also part of the research teams of the Miocene fossils of Venta del Moro, Loranca, and Cerro de los Batallones, among others.

In 1978, Soria was a professor of Vertebrate Zoology at the Faculty of Sciences of the Higher University of San Andrés in La Paz, and was part of the Coordinating Committee of the UNESCO Man and the Biosphere Program.

She directed several research projects that deepened the knowledge of diversity, evolution, biostratigraphy, and paleoecology of ruminant groups. Among them, her work with the French team that has studied the paleontology of the Cenozoic of Namibia since 1994, and with the Spanish team along Lake Natron, Tanzania stand out. She was an expert in carnivores of the Cenozoic era, extinct lineages of ruminants, and in the evolution of mammals in South America.

== Tributes ==
In 2009, the National Museum of Natural Sciences dedicated the monographic volume Notas para la historia reciente del Museo Nacional de Ciencias Naturales. Homenaje a Dolores Soria Mayor to her.

=== Dedicated taxa ===
- Cricetodon soriae Hernández Fernández and collaborators, 2006, a species of cricetine from the Somosaguas site, Madrid
- Gacella soriae Alcalá y Morales, 2006, a species of antelope from La Calera deposit in Teruel
- Parabos soriae Morales, 1984, a species of bovine from Venta del Moro deposit, Valencia
