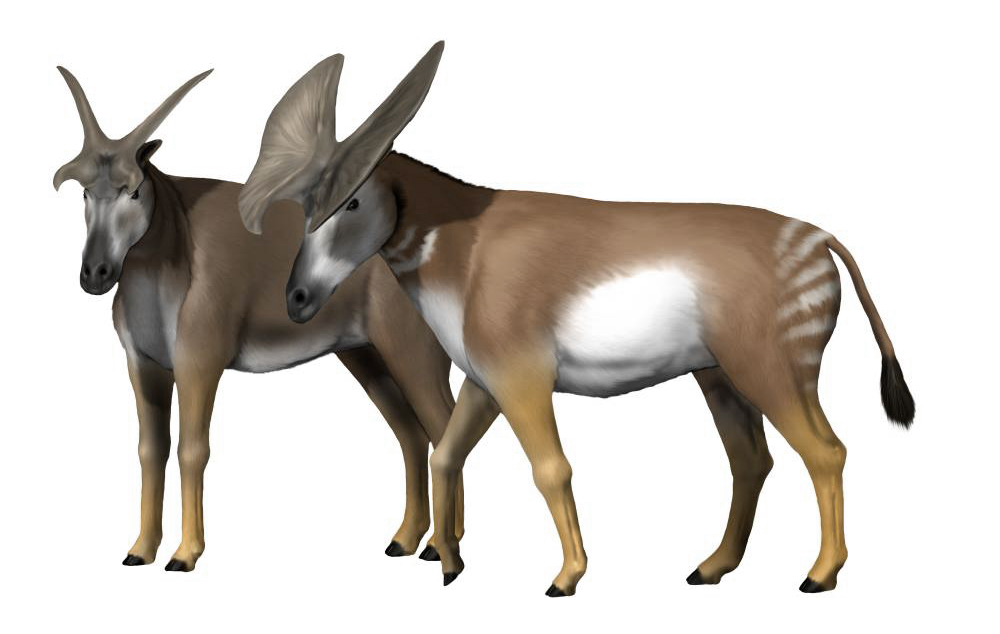
- Prolibytherium magnieri restoration, with female (left) and male (right)

Scientific classification
- Kingdom: Animalia
- Phylum: Chordata
- Class: Mammalia
- Order: Artiodactyla
- Family: †Prolibytheriidae
- Genus: †Prolibytherium; Arambourg, 1961

Type species
- †Prolibytherium magnieri

Species
- †P. fusum Danowitz et al., 2016; †P. magnieri Arambourg, 1961

= Prolibytherium =

Prolibytherium Temporal range: Burdigalian ~16.9–15.97 Ma

Genus of extinct artiodactyl mammals from the early Miocene

Prolibytherium is an extinct genus of prolibytheriid artiodactyl ungulate native to Middle Miocene North Africa and Pakistan, from around 16.9 to 15.97 million years ago. Fossils of Prolibytherium were found in the Marada Formation of Libya, Vihowa Formation of Pakistan, and the Moghara Formation of Egypt.

== Taxonomy ==
The taxonomic status of Prolibytherium remains in flux. At one time, it was described as a relative of Sivatherium (as a precursor to "Libytherium maurusium" (S. maurusium)). Later, it would be regarded as a palaeomerycid, or either as a climacoceratid, or as a basal member of Giraffoidea. With the discovery and study of a female skull in 2010, Prolibytherium was tentatively classified as a climacoceratid. A recent study published in 2022 found it to be part of a separate family, Prolibytheriidae.

== Description ==
The 1.80 metres (5 ft 11 in) long creature would have superficially resembled an okapi or a deer. Unlike these, however, Prolibytherium displayed dramatic sexual dimorphism, in that the male had a set of large, leaf-shaped ossicones with a width of 35 centimetres (14 in), while the female had a set of slender, horn-like ossicones.

Prolibytherium's occipital condyle and atlas bones were modified to strengthen the support to its head.
