= Orangemeryx =

Orangemeryx Temporal range: Early Miocene

Scientific classification
- Missing taxonomy template (fix): Orangemeryx
- Species: Template:Taxonomy/OrangemeryxO. hendeyi

Binomial name
- Template:Taxonomy/OrangemeryxOrangemeryx hendeyi Morales et al., 1999

Extinct genus of climacoceratine ungulate

Orangemeryx is an extinct monotypic genus of climacoceratine ungulate that lived in Africa during the Early Miocene subepoch.

== Etymology ==
The generic name Orangemeryx references the Orange River and the Greek word meryx, meaning deer. The specific epithet of the type species, Orangemeryx hendeyi, honours the palaeontologist Q. B. Hendey.
