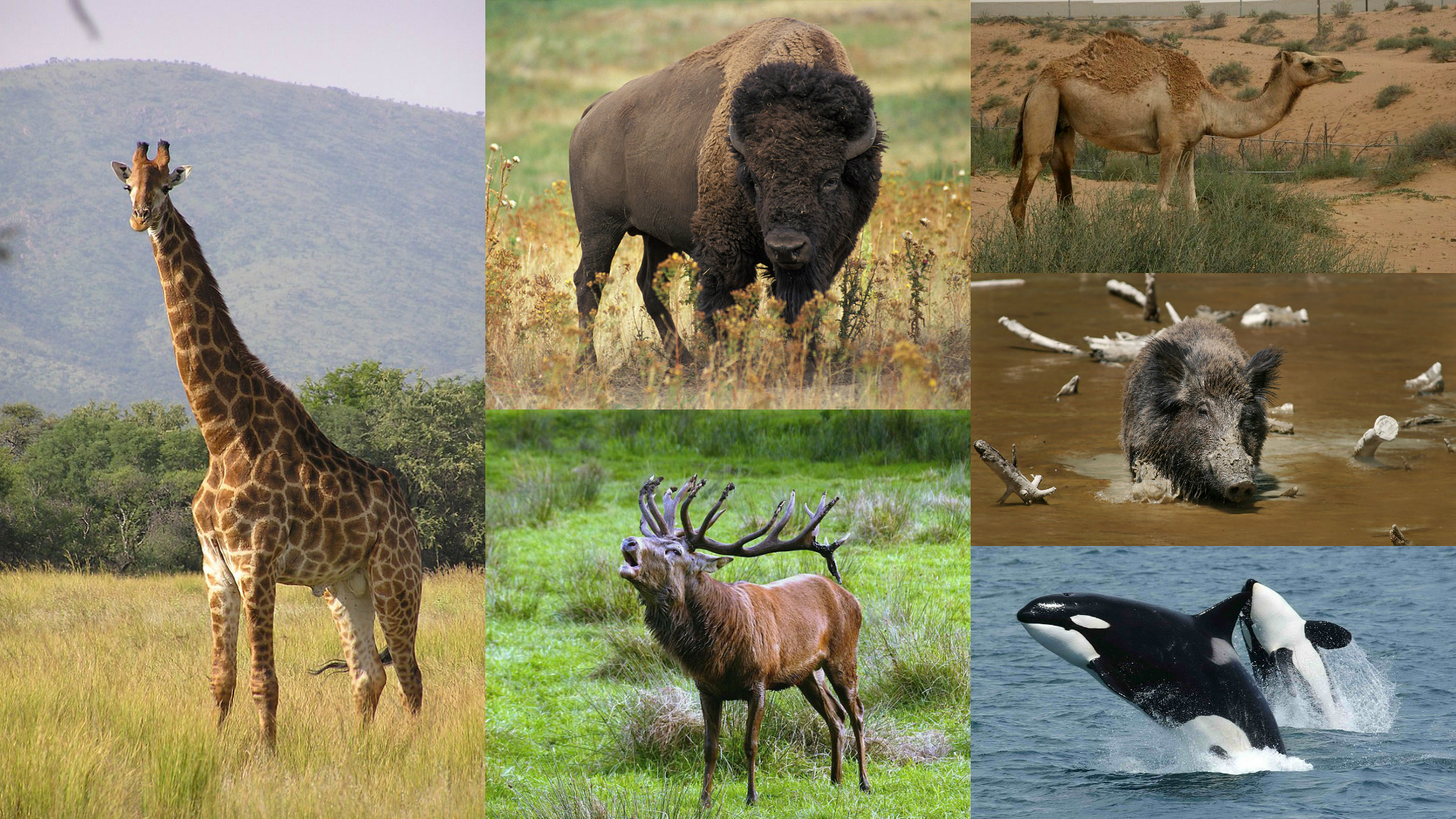
- Clockwise from center: American bison (Bison bison), dromedary (Camelus dromedarius), wild boar (Sus scrofa), orca (Orcinus orca), red deer (Cervus elaphus), and northern giraffe (Giraffa camelopardalis)

Scientific classification
- Kingdom: Animalia
- Phylum: Chordata
- Class: Mammalia
- Clade: Scrotifera
- Grandorder: Ferungulata
- Clade: Pan-Euungulata
- Mirorder: Euungulata
- Clade: Paraxonia
- Order: Artiodactyla; Owen, 1848

Subdivisions
- Tylopoda; Artiofabula; Suina; Cetruminantia; Ruminantia; Whippomorpha; Ancodonta; Cetacea (historically excluded)

Synonyms
- Cetartiodactyla Montgelard et al., 1997

= Artiodactyla =

Artiodactyla Temporal range: 55.4–0 Ma Early Eocene – Holocene

Order of mammals

Artiodactyla (/ˌɑːrtioʊˈdæktɪlə/ AR-tee-oh-DAK-tih-lə; from Ancient Greek ἄρτιος ártios 'even' and δάκτυλος dáktylos 'finger, toe') is an order of placental mammals. Typically, they are ungulates which bear weight equally on two (an even number) of their five toes (the third and fourth, often in the form of a hoof). The other three toes are either present, absent, vestigial, or pointing posteriorly. By contrast, most perissodactyls bear weight on an odd number of the five toes. Another difference between the two orders is that many artiodactyls (except for Suina) digest plant cellulose in one or more stomach chambers rather than in their intestine (as perissodactyls do). Molecular biology, along with fossil discoveries, has found that cetaceans (whales, dolphins, and porpoises) fall within this taxonomic branch, being most closely related to hippopotamuses. Some modern taxonomists thus apply the name Cetartiodactyla (/sɪˌtɑːrtioʊˈdæktɪlə/) to this group, while others opt to include cetaceans within the existing name of Artiodactyla. Some researchers use "even-toed ungulates" to exclude cetaceans and only include terrestrial artiodactyls, making the term paraphyletic in nature.

The roughly 270 land-based even-toed ungulate species include pigs, peccaries, hippopotamuses, antelopes, deer, giraffes, camels, llamas, alpacas, sheep, goats and cattle. Many are herbivores, but pigs are omnivorous, and cetaceans are carnivorous. Artiodactyls are also known by many extinct groups such as anoplotheres, cainotheriids, merycoidodonts, entelodonts, anthracotheres, basilosaurids, and palaeomerycids. Many artiodactyls are of dietary, economic, and cultural importance to humans.

== Evolutionary history ==
The oldest fossils of even-toed ungulates date back to the early Eocene (about 53 million years ago). Since these findings almost simultaneously appeared in Europe, Asia, and North America, it is very difficult to accurately determine the origin of artiodactyls. The earliest artiodactyls did not significantly affect ungulate locomotor disparity in North America, which suggests that artiodactyls did not outcompete more basal ungulates through competitive exclusion. The oldest artidactyl fossils are classified as belonging to the family Diacodexeidae; their best-known and best-preserved member is Diacodexis. These were small animals, some as small as a hare, with a slim build, lanky legs, and a long tail. Their hind legs were much longer than their front legs. The early to middle Eocene saw the emergence of the ancestors of most of today's mammals.

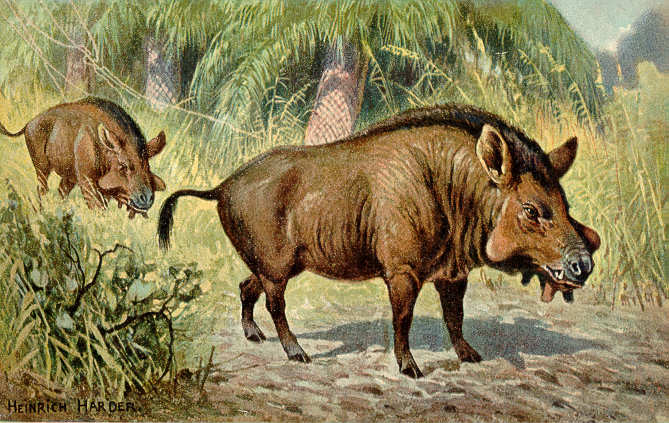
Entelodonts were stocky animals with a large head, and were characterized by bony bumps on the lower jaw.

Two formerly widespread, but now extinct, families of even-toed ungulates were Entelodontidae and Anthracotheriidae. Entelodonts existed from the middle Eocene to the early Miocene in Eurasia and North America. They had a stocky body with short legs and a massive head, which was characterized by two humps on the lower jaw bone. Anthracotheres had a large, porcine (pig-like) build, with short legs and an elongated muzzle. This group appeared in the middle Eocene up until the Pliocene, and spread throughout Eurasia, Africa, and North America. Anthracotheres are thought to be the ancestors of hippos, and, likewise, probably led a similar aquatic lifestyle. Hippopotamuses appeared in the late Miocene and occupied Africa and Asia, but never got to the Americas.

The camels (Tylopoda) were, during large parts of the Cenozoic, limited to North America; early forms like Cainotheriidae occupied Europe. Among the North American camels were groups like the stocky, short-legged Merycoidodontidae. They first appeared in the late Eocene and developed a great diversity of species in North America. Only in the late Miocene or early Pliocene did they migrate from North America into Eurasia. The North American species became extinct around 10,000 years ago.

Suina (including pigs) have been around since the Eocene. In the late Eocene or the Oligocene, two families stayed in Eurasia and Africa; the peccaries, which became extinct in the Old World, exist today only in the Americas.

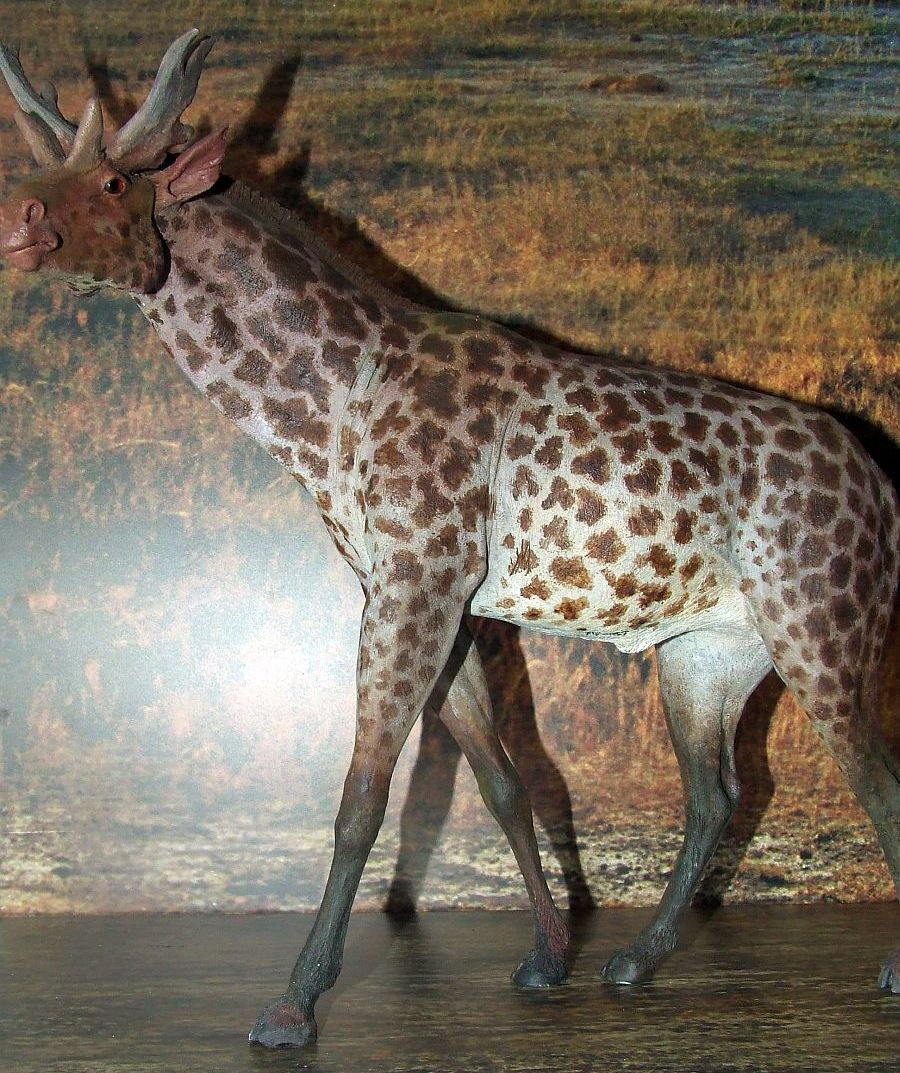
Sivatherium was a relative of giraffes with deer-like forehead ossicones.

South America was settled by terrestrial even-toed ungulates only in the Pliocene, after the land bridge at the Isthmus of Panama formed some three million years ago. With only the peccaries, lamoids (or llamas), and various species of capreoline deer, South America has comparatively fewer artiodactyl families than other continents, except Australia, which has no (terrestrial) native species, and Antarctica which has no terrestrial mammals at all.

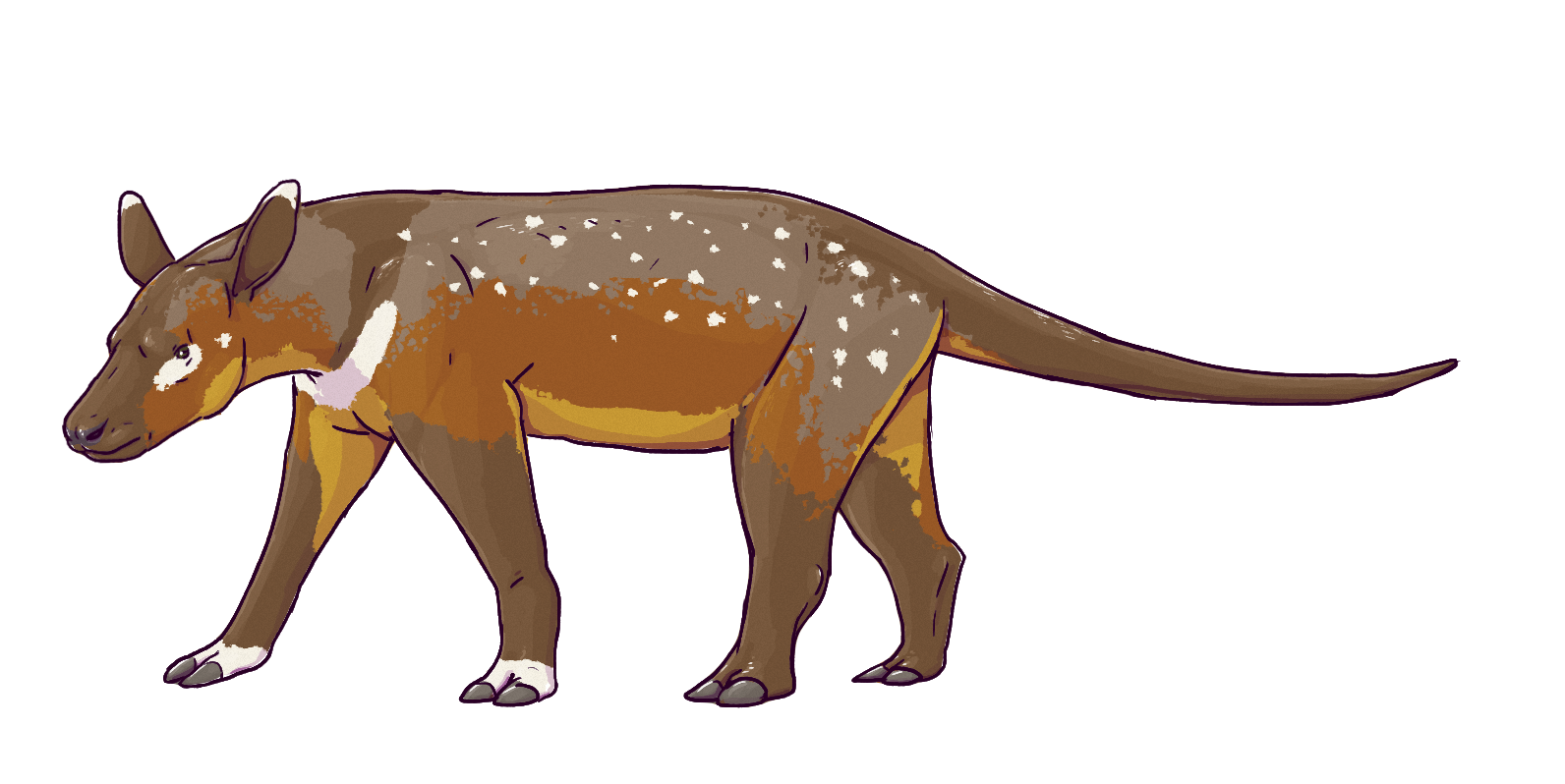
Anoplotherium was the first fossil artiodactyl genus to be named, with a history dating back to 1804. It lived in Europe as part of the endemic family Anoplotheriidae during the late Eocene-earliest Oligocene.

== Taxonomy and phylogeny ==
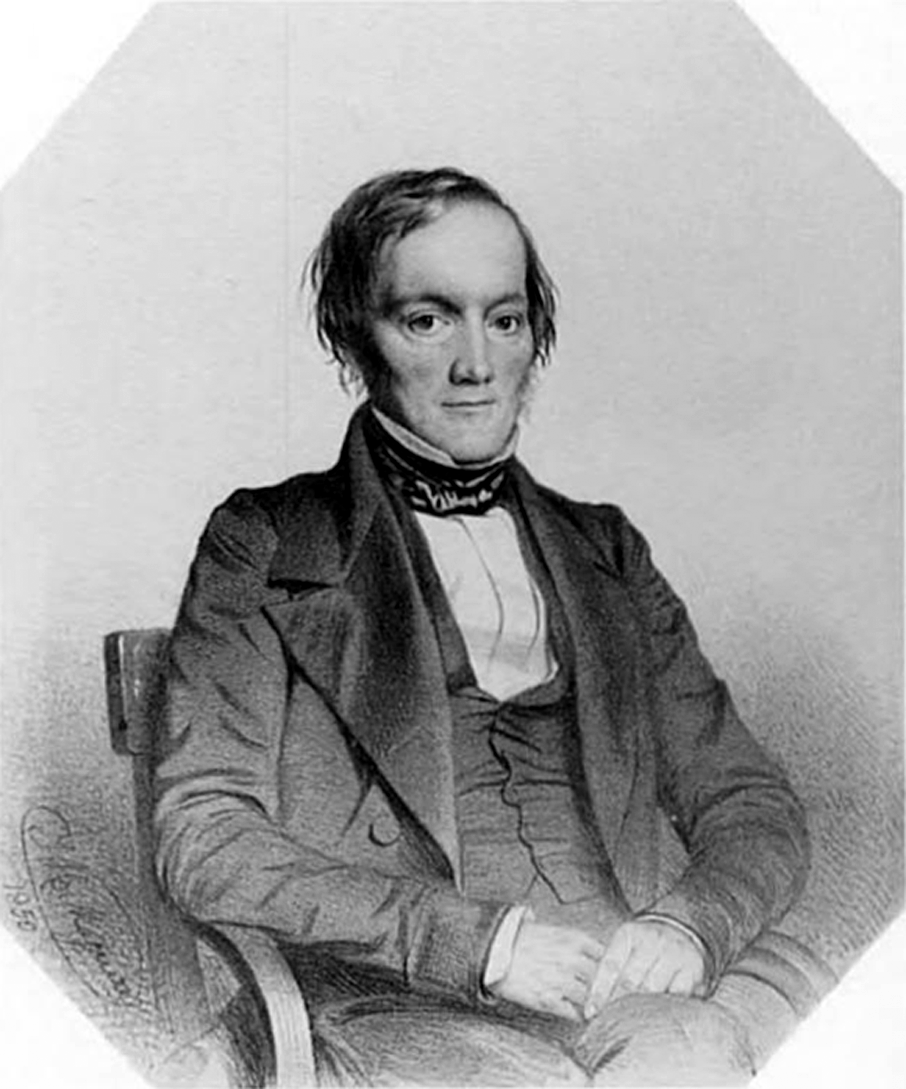
Richard Owen coined the term "even-toed ungulate".

The classification of artiodactyls was hotly debated because ocean-dwelling cetaceans evolved from land-dwelling even-toed ungulates. Some semiaquatic even-toed ungulates (hippopotamuses) are more closely related to ocean-dwelling cetaceans than to other even-toed ungulates.

Phylogenetic classification only recognizes monophyletic taxa; that is, groups that descend from a common ancestor and include all of its descendants. To address this problem, the traditional order Artiodactyla and infraorder Cetacea are sometimes subsumed into the more inclusive Cetartiodactyla taxon. An alternative approach is to include both land-dwelling even-toed ungulates and ocean-dwelling cetaceans in a revised Artiodactyla taxon.

=== Classification ===
Order Artiodactyla/Clade Cetartiodactyla

- Basal and incertae sedis
  - Family †Diacodexeidae
  - Family †Dichobunidae
  - Family †Cebochoeridae
  - Family †Leptochoeridae
  - Family †Homacodontidae
  - Superfamily Anoplotheroidea (possible tylopoda or stem-ruminantia)
    - Family †Mixtotheriidae
    - Family †Robiacinidae
    - Family †Cainotheriidae
    - Family †Anoplotheriidae
    - Family †Amphimerycidae?
    - Family †Xiphodontidae?
  - Superfamily Merycoidodontoidea (oreodonts, possible tylopoda or stem-ruminantia)
    - Family † Merycoidodontidae
    - Family † Agriochoeridae
  - Family †Protoceratidae (possible tylopoda or stem-ruminantia)
  - Suborder Tylopoda
    - Family Camelidae: camels, llamas, alpacas, vicuñas, and guanacos (7 extant and 13 extinct species)
    - Family †Oromerycidae
  - Clade Artiofabula
    - Suborder Suina
      - Family Suidae: pigs (19 species)
      - Family Tayassuidae: peccaries (4 species)
      - Family †Sanitheriidae
      - Family †Doliochoeridae
    - Clade Cetruminantia
      - Clade Cetancodontamorpha
        - Genus †Andrewsarchus?
        - Family †Helohyidae?
        - Family †Entelodontidae?
        - Suborder Whippomorpha
          - Infraorder Ancodonta
            - Family †Choeropotamidae
            - Family †Anthracotheriidae – paraphyletic to Hippopotamidae
            - Family Hippopotamidae: hippos (two species)
          - Clade Cetaceamorpha
            - Family †Raoellidae
            - Infraorder Cetacea: whales (about 90 species)
              - Parvorder †Archaeoceti – paraphyletic
                - Family †Kalakocetidae
                - Family †Pakicetidae
                - Family †Ambulocetidae
                - Family †Remingtonocetidae
                - Family †Protocetidae – paraphyletic
                - Family †Basilosauridae
              - Clade Neoceti
                - Parvorder Mysticeti: baleen whales
                  - Superfamily Balaenoidea: right whales
                    - Family Balaenidae: greater right whales (four species)
                    - Family Cetotheriidae: pygmy right whale (one species)
                  - Superfamily Balaenopteroidea: large baleen whales
                    - Family Balaenopteridae: slender-back rorquals and humpback whale (eight species)
                    - Family Eschrichtiidae: gray whale (one species)
                - Parvorder Odontoceti: toothed whales
                  - Superfamily Delphinoidea: oceanic dolphins, porpoises, and others
                    - Family Delphinidae: oceanic true dolphins (38 species)
                    - Family Monodontidae: Arctic whales; narwhal and beluga (two species)
                    - Family Phocoenidae: porpoises (six species)
                  - Superfamily Physeteroidea: sperm whales
                    - Family Kogiidae: lesser sperm whales (two species)
                    - Family Physeteridae: sperm whale (one species)
                  - Superfamily Platanistoidea: river dolphins
                    - Family Iniidae: South American river dolphins (two species)
                    - Family Lipotidae: Chinese river dolphin (one species, possibly extinct)
                    - Family Platanistidae: South Asian river dolphin (one species)
                    - Family Pontoporiidae: La Plata dolphin (one species)
                  - Superfamily Ziphioidea
                    - Family Ziphiidae: beaked whales (22 species)
      - Total-group Ruminantia
        - Suborder Ruminantia
          - Infraorder Tragulina (paraphyletic)
            - Family †Archaeomerycidae
            - Family †Leptomerycidae
            - Family †Hypertragulidae
            - Family †Praetragulidae
            - Family †Lophiomerycidae
            - Family †Gelocidae
            - Family †Bachitheriidae
            - Family Tragulidae: chevrotains (ten species)
          - Infraorder Pecora
            - Family Antilocapridae: pronghorn (one species)
            - Family †Hoplitomerycidae
            - Superfamily Giraffoidea
              - Family †Palaeomerycidae
              - Family †Climacoceratidae
              - Family Giraffidae: okapi and four species of giraffe (five species total)
            - Superfamily Cervoidea
              - Family †Dromomerycidae?
              - Family Cervidae: deer (49 species)
            - Superfamily Bovoidea
              - Family Moschidae: musk deer (7 species)
              - Family Bovidae: cattle, goats, sheep and antelopes (135 species)

=== Research history ===
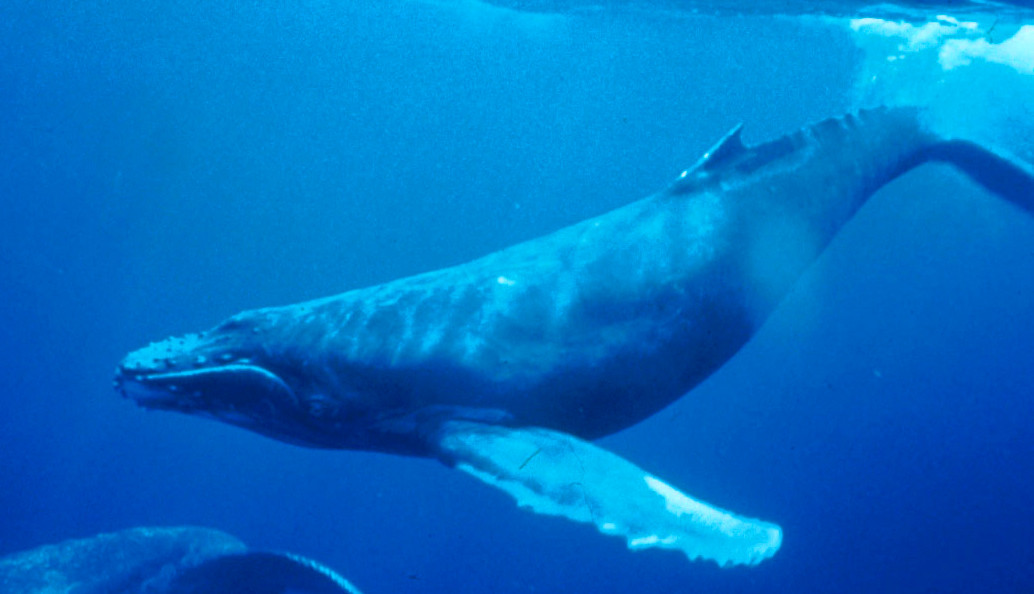
Molecular and morphological studies confirmed that cetaceans are the closest living relatives of hippopotamuses.

In the 1990s, biological systematics used not only morphology and fossils to classify organisms, but also molecular biology. Molecular biology involves sequencing an organism's DNA and RNA and comparing the sequence with that of other living beings; the more similar they are, the more closely they are related. Comparison of even-toed ungulate and cetaceans genetic material has shown that the closest living relatives of whales and hippopotamuses is the paraphyletic group Artiodactyla.

Dan Graur and Desmond Higgins were among the first to come to this conclusion, and included a paper published in 1994. However, they did not recognize hippopotamuses and classified the ruminants as the sister group of cetaceans. Subsequent studies established the close relationship between hippopotamuses and cetaceans; these studies were based on casein genes, SINEs, fibrinogen sequences, cytochrome and rRNA sequences, IRBP (and vWF) gene sequences, adrenergic receptors, and apolipoproteins.

In 2001, the fossil limbs of a Pakicetus (amphibioid cetacean the size of a wolf) and Ichthyolestes (an early whale the size of a fox) were found in Pakistan. They were both archaeocetes ("ancient whales") from about 48 million years ago (in the Eocene). These findings showed that archaeocetes were more terrestrial than previously thought, and that the special construction of the talus (ankle bone) with a double-rolled joint surface, previously thought to be unique to even-toed ungulates, were also in early cetaceans. The mesonychians, another type of ungulate, did not show this special construction of the talus, and thus was concluded to not have the same ancestors as cetaceans.

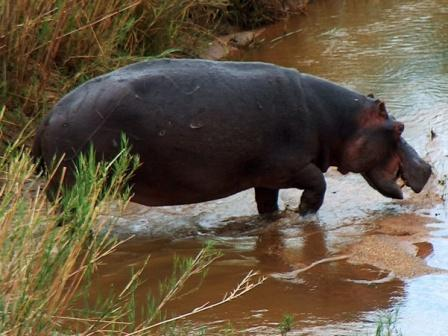
Hippopotamuses are a geologically young group, which raises questions about their origin.

The oldest cetaceans date back to the early Eocene (53 million years ago), whereas the oldest known hippopotamus dates back only to the Miocene (15 million years ago). The hippopotamids are descended from the anthracotheres, a family of semiaquatic and terrestrial artiodactyls that appeared in the late Eocene, and are thought to have resembled small- or narrow-headed hippos. Research is therefore focused on anthracotheres (family Anthracotheriidae); one dating from the Eocene to Miocene was declared to be "hippo-like" upon discovery in the 19th century. A study from 2005 showed that the anthracotheres and hippopotamuses had very similar skulls, but differed in the adaptations of their teeth. It was nevertheless believed that cetaceans and anthracothereres descended from a common ancestor, and that hippopotamuses developed from anthracotheres. A study published in 2015 confirmed this, but also revealed that hippopotamuses were derived from older anthracotherians. The newly introduced genus Epirigenys from Eastern Africa is thus the sister group of hippos.

==== Historical classification of Artiodactyla ====
Linnaeus postulated a close relationship between camels and ruminants as early as the mid-1700s. Henri de Blainville recognized the similar anatomy of the limbs of pigs and hippos, and British zoologist Richard Owen coined the term "even-toed ungulates" and the scientific name "Artiodactyla" in 1848.

Internal morphology (mainly the stomach and the molars) were used for classification. Suines (including pigs) and hippopotamuses have molars with well-developed roots and a simple stomach that digests food. Thus, they were grouped together as non-ruminants (porcine). All other even-toed ungulates have molars with a selenodont construction (crescent-shaped cusps) and have the ability to ruminate, which requires regurgitating food and re-chewing it. Differences in stomach construction indicated that rumination evolved independently between tylopods and ruminants; therefore, tylopods were excluded from Ruminantia.

The taxonomy that was widely accepted by the end of the 20th century was:

- Even-toed ungulates
  - Suina
    - Suidae
    - Hippopotamidae
  - Selenodont
    - Tylopoda
    - Ruminants
      - Tragulidae
      - Pecora

==== Historical classification of Cetacea ====
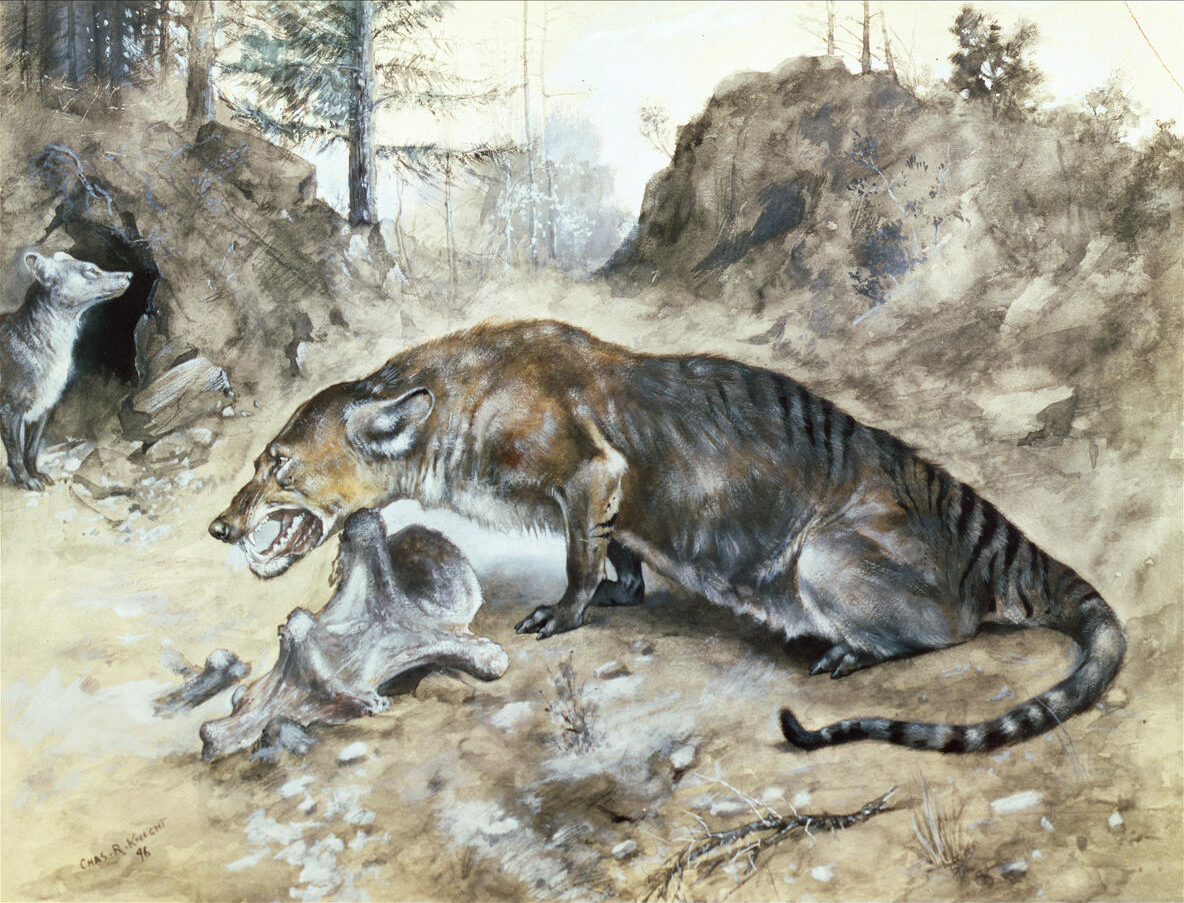
The mesonychians were long considered ancestors of whales.

Modern cetaceans are highly adapted marine mammals which, morphologically, have little in common with land mammals; they are similar to other marine mammals, such as seals and sea cows, due to convergent evolution. However, they evolved from originally terrestrial mammals. The most likely ancestors were long thought to be mesonychians, large carnivorous animals from the early Cenozoic (Paleocene and Eocene), which had hooves instead of claws on their feet. Mesonychian molars were adapted to a carnivorous diet, resembling the teeth in modern toothed whales, and, unlike other mammals, had a uniform construction.

The then suspected relations were as follows:

- Paraxonia
  - Artiodactyla
  - Cetaceamorpha
    - Mesonychia †
    - Cetacea

=== Inner systematics ===
Molecular findings and morphological indications suggest that Artiodactyla, as traditionally defined, is paraphyletic with respect to Cetacea. Cetaceans are deeply nested within the former; the two groups together form a monophyletic taxon, for which the name Cetartiodactyla is sometimes used. Modern nomenclature divides Artiodactyla (or Cetartiodactyla) in four subordinate taxa, camelids (Tylopoda), pigs and peccaries (Suina), ruminants (Ruminantia), and hippos plus cetaceans (Whippomorpha).

The presumed lineages within Artiodactyla can be represented in the following cladogram:

- Artiodactyla
  - Tylopoda (camels)
  - Artiofabula
    - Suina (pigs)
    - Cetruminantia
      - Ruminantia (ruminants)
        - Tragulidae (mouse deer)
        - Pecora (horn bearers)
      - Cetancodonta (or Whippomorpha)
        - Hippopotamidae (hippopotamuses)
        - Cetacea (whales)

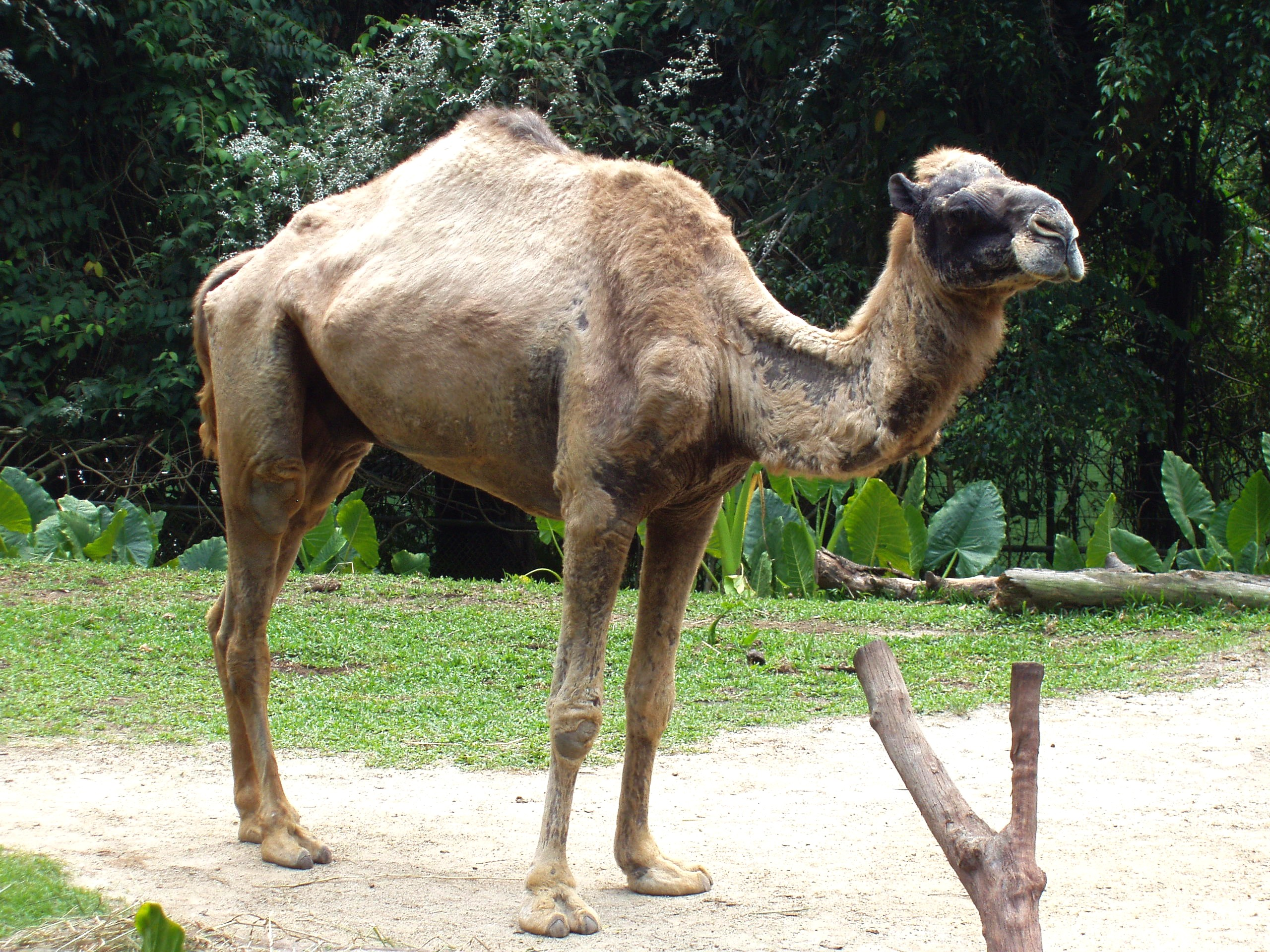
Camels, like this dromedary, are now considered a sister group to Artiofabula.

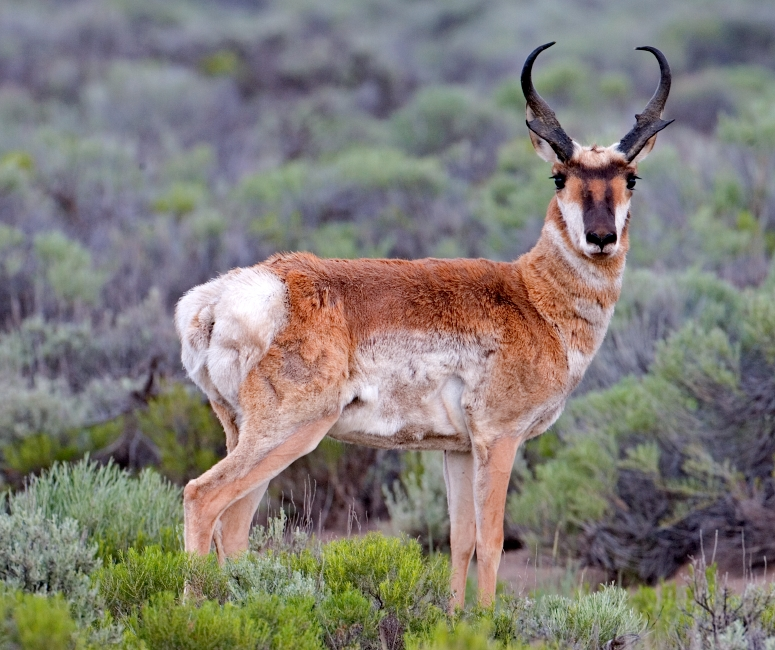
The pronghorn is the only extant antilocaprid.

The four summarized Artiodactyla taxa are divided into ten extant families:

- The camelids (Tylopoda) comprise only one family, Camelidae. This is a species-poor artiodactyl suborder of North American origin that is well adapted to extreme habitats; the dromedary and Bactrian camels in the Old World deserts and the guanacos, llamas, vicuñas, and alpacas in South American high mountain regions.
- The pig-like creatures (Suina) are made up of two families:
  - The pigs (Suidae) are limited to the Old World. These include the wild boar and the domesticated form, the domestic pig.
  - The peccaries (Tayassuidae) are named after glands on their belly and are indigenous to Central and South America.
- The ruminants (Ruminantia) consist of six families:
  - The mouse deer (Tragulidae) are the smallest and most primitive even-toed-ruminants; they inhabit forests of Africa and Asia.
  - The giraffe-like creatures (Giraffidae) are composed of two species, the giraffe and the okapi.
  - The musk deer (Moschidae) is indigenous to East Asia.
  - The antilocaprids (Antilocapridae) of North America comprise only one extant species, the pronghorn.
  - The deer (Cervidae) are made up of about 45 species, which are characterized by a pair of antlers (generally only in males). They are widespread across Europe, Asia, and the Americas. This group includes, among other species, the red deer, moose, roe deer, muntjacs, and reindeer (caribou).
  - The bovids (Bovidae) are the most species-rich family. Among them are cattle, sheep, caprines, and antelopes, and more.
- The whippomorphs include hippos and cetaceans:
  - The hippos (Hippopotamidae) comprise two species, the common hippo and the pygmy hippo.
  - The cetaceans comprise 72 species in two parvorders, the toothed whales (Odontoceti) and the baleen whales (Mysticeti).

Although deer, musk deer, and pronghorns have traditionally been summarized as cervids (Cervioidea), molecular studies provide different, and inconsistent, results, so the question of phylogenetic systematics of infraorder Pecora (the horned ruminants) for the time being, is not yet answered.

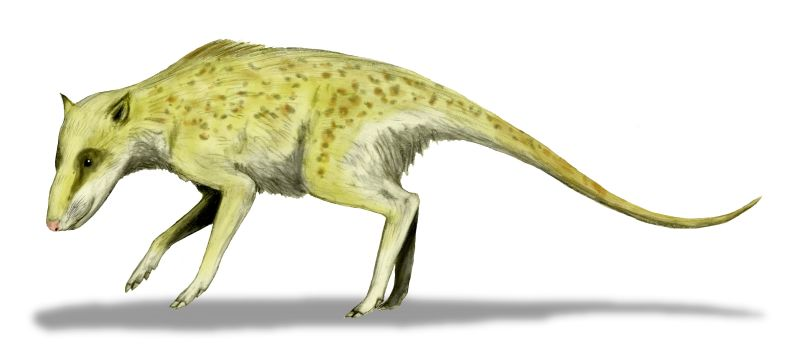
Life restoration of Indohyus, an early artiodactyl closely related to cetaceans.

== Anatomy ==
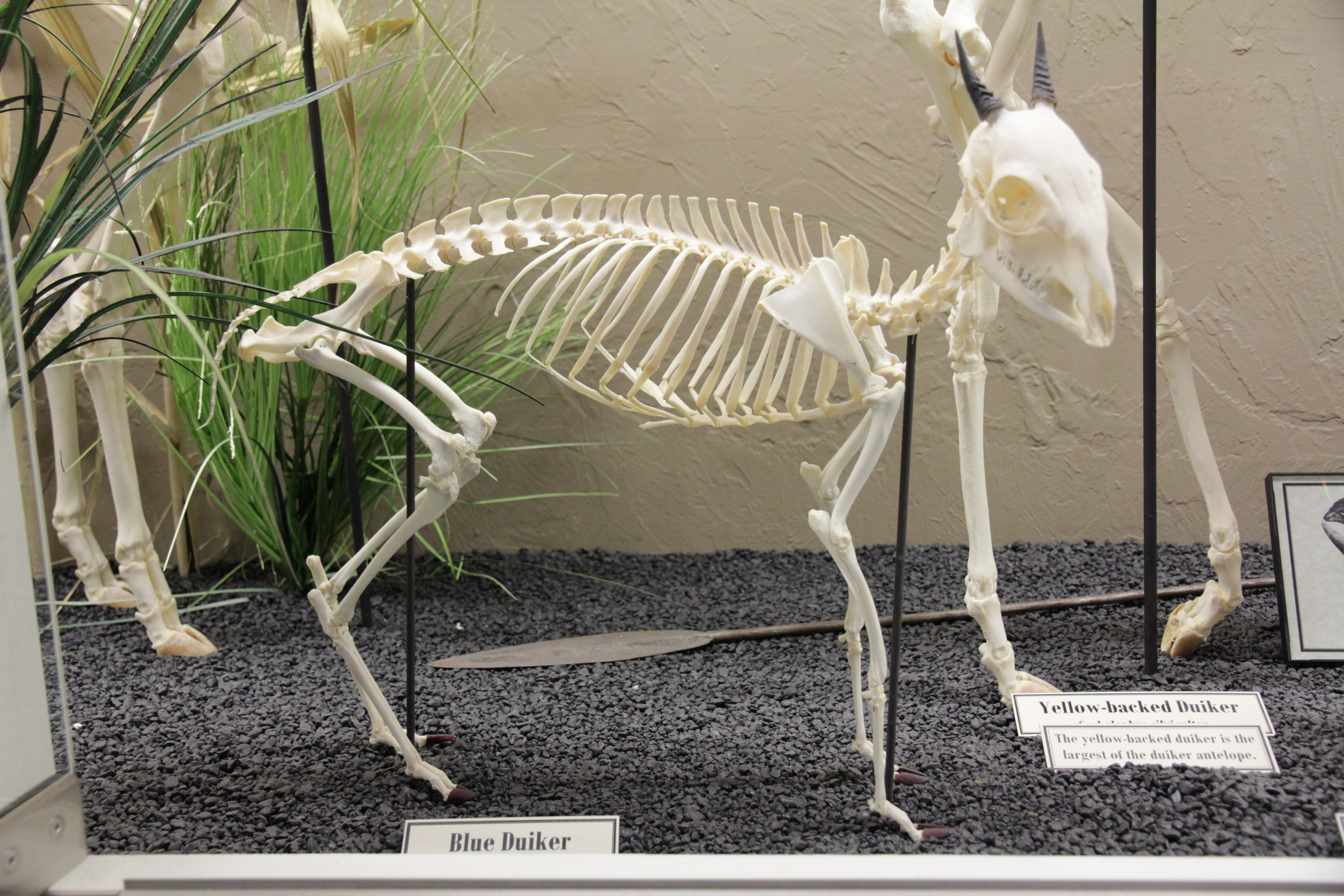
A blue duiker skeleton on display at the Museum of Osteology

Apart from cetaceans, artiodactyls are generally quadrupeds. Two major body types are known: suinids and hippopotamuses are characterized by a stocky body, short legs, and a large head; camels and ruminants, though, have a more slender build and lanky legs. Size varies considerably; the smallest member, the mouse deer, often reaches a body length of only 45 centimeters (18 in) and a weight of 1.5 kilograms (3.3 lb). The largest member, the hippopotamus, can grow up to 5 meters (16 ft) in length and weigh 4.5 metric tons (5 short tons), and the giraffe can grow to be 5.5 meters (18 ft) tall and 4.7 meters (15 ft) in body length. All even-toed ungulates display some form of sexual dimorphism: the males are consistently larger and heavier than the females. In the majority of deer species, only the males grow antlers, and the horns of bovines are usually small or not present in females. Male Indian antelopes have a much darker coat than females. In cetaceans the two forelimbs have evolved into flippers, and the hind legs lost to external view; the largest cetaceans, up to 30 m (98 ft) long, are considerably larger than any other artiodactyls.

Almost all even-toed ungulates have fur, with the exception being the nearly hairless hippopotamus. Fur varies in length and coloration depending on the habitat. Species in cooler regions can shed their coat in summer. Camouflaged coats come in colors of yellow, gray, brown, or black tones. Cetaceans are largely hairless, apart from a few small facial whiskers.

=== Limbs ===
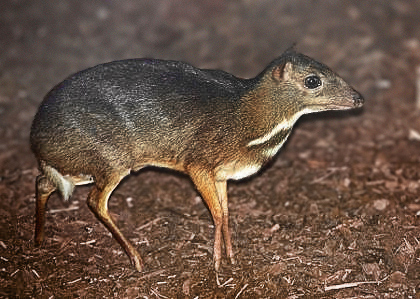
The mouse deer is the smallest artiodactyl.

Even-toed ungulates bear their name because they have an even number of toes (two or four). In some peccaries, the hind legs have a reduction in the number of toes to three. The central axis of the leg is between the third and fourth toe. The first toe is missing in modern artiodactyls, and can only be found in now-extinct genera. The second and fifth toes are adapted differently between species:

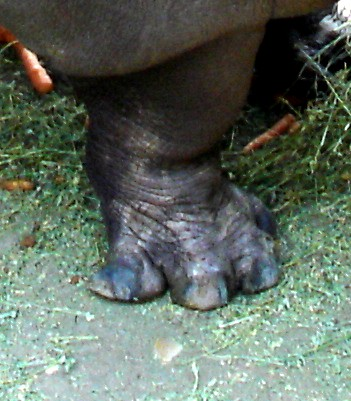
Hippopotamuses have all four toes pointing out.

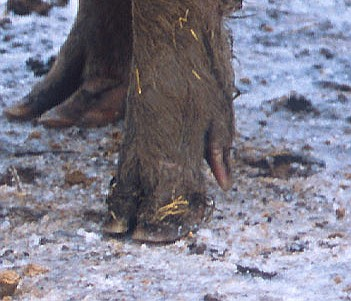
In pigs and other biungulates, the second and fifth toes are directed backwards.

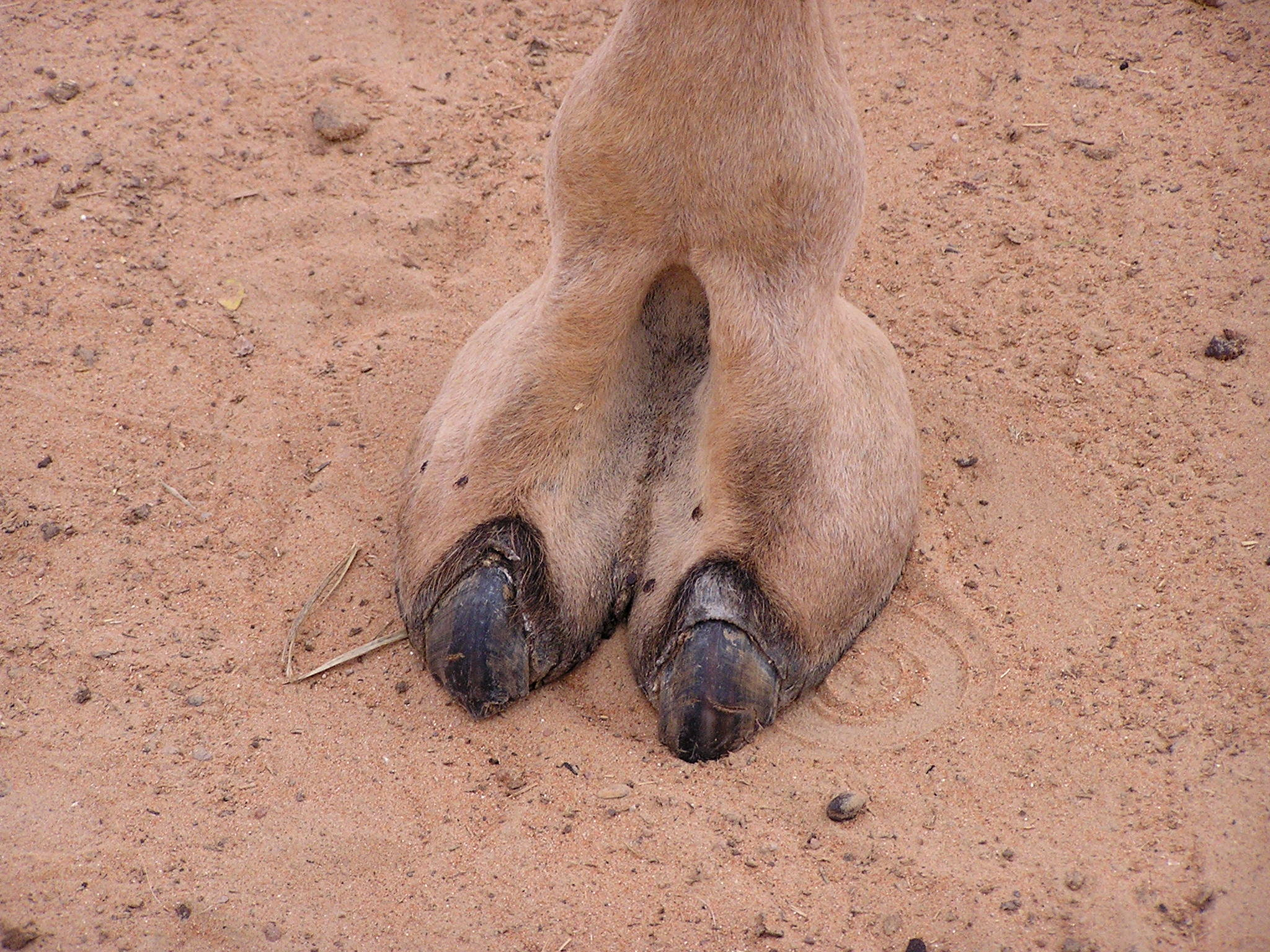
When camels have only two toes present, the claws are transformed into nails.

When camels have only two toes present, the claws are transformed into nails (while both are made of keratin, claws are curved and pointed while nails are flat and blunt). These claws consist of three parts: the plate (top and sides), the sole (bottom), and the bale (rear). In general, the claws of the forelegs are wider and blunter than those of the hind legs, and they are farther apart. Aside from camels, all even-toed ungulates put just the tip of the foremost phalanx on the ground.

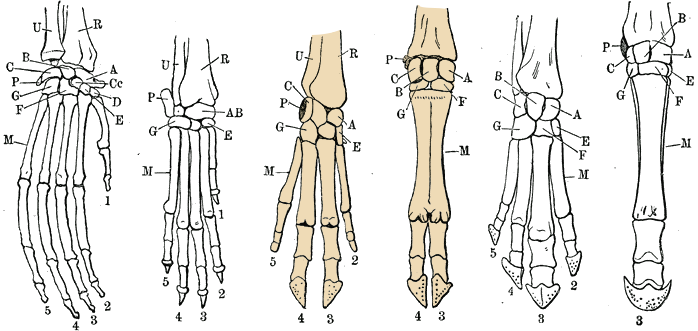
Diagrams of hand skeletons of various mammals, left to right: orangutan, dog, pig, cow, tapir, and horse. Highlighted are the even-toed ungulates pig and cow.

In even-toed ungulates, the bones of the stylopodium (upper arm or thigh bone) and zygopodiums (tibia and fibula) are usually elongated. The muscles of the limbs are predominantly localized, which ensures that artiodactyls often have very slender legs. A clavicle is never present, and the scapula is very agile and swings back and forth for added mobility when running. The special construction of the legs causes the legs to be unable to rotate, which allows for greater stability when running at high speeds. In addition, many smaller artiodactyls have a very flexible body, contributing to their speed by increasing their stride length.

=== Head ===
Many even-toed ungulates have a relatively large head. The skull is elongated and rather narrow; the frontal bone is enlarged near the back and displaces the parietal bone, which forms only part of the side of the cranium (especially in ruminants).

==== Horns and antlers ====
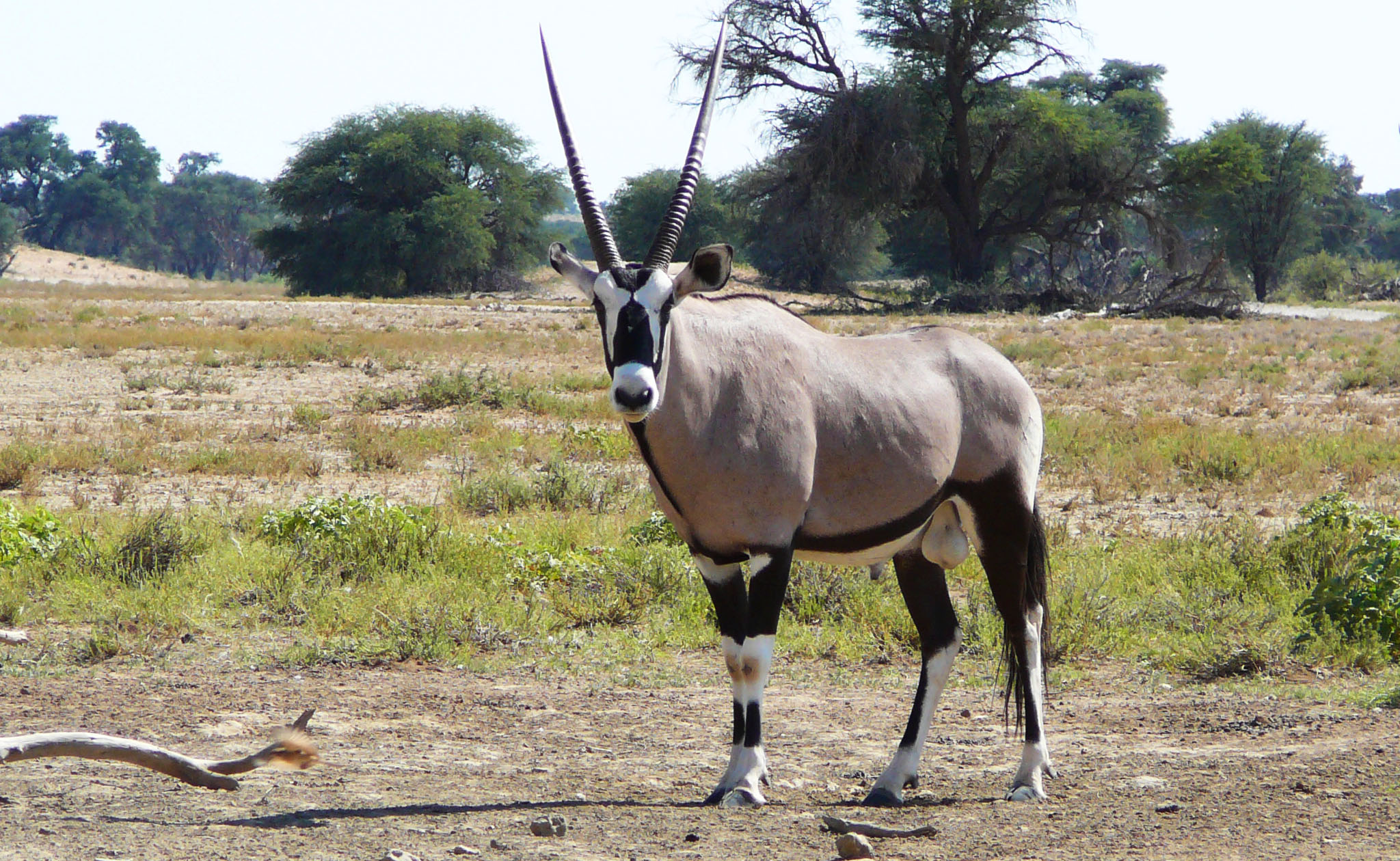
Outgrowths of the frontal bone characterize most forehead weapons carriers, such as the gemsbok and its horns.

Four families of even-toed ungulates have cranial appendages. These Pecora (with the exception of the musk deer), have one of four types of cranial appendages: true horns, antlers, ossicones, or pronghorns.

True horns have a bone core that is covered in a permanent sheath of keratin, and are found only in the bovids. Antlers are bony structures that are shed and replaced each year; they are found in deer (members of the family Cervidae). They grow from a permanent outgrowth of the frontal bone called the pedicle and can be branched, as in the white-tailed deer (Odocoileus virginianus), or palmate, as in the moose (Alces alces). Ossicones are permanent bone structures that fuse to the frontal or parietal bones during an animal's life and are found only in the Giraffidae. Pronghorns, while similar to horns in that they have keratinous sheaths covering permanent bone cores, are deciduous.

All these cranial appendages can serve for posturing, battling for mating privilege, and for defense. In almost all cases, they are sexually dimorphic, and are often found only on the males. One exception is the species Rangifer tarandus, known as reindeer in Europe or caribou in North America, where both sexes can grow antlers yearly, though the females' antlers are typically smaller and not always present.

==== Teeth ====
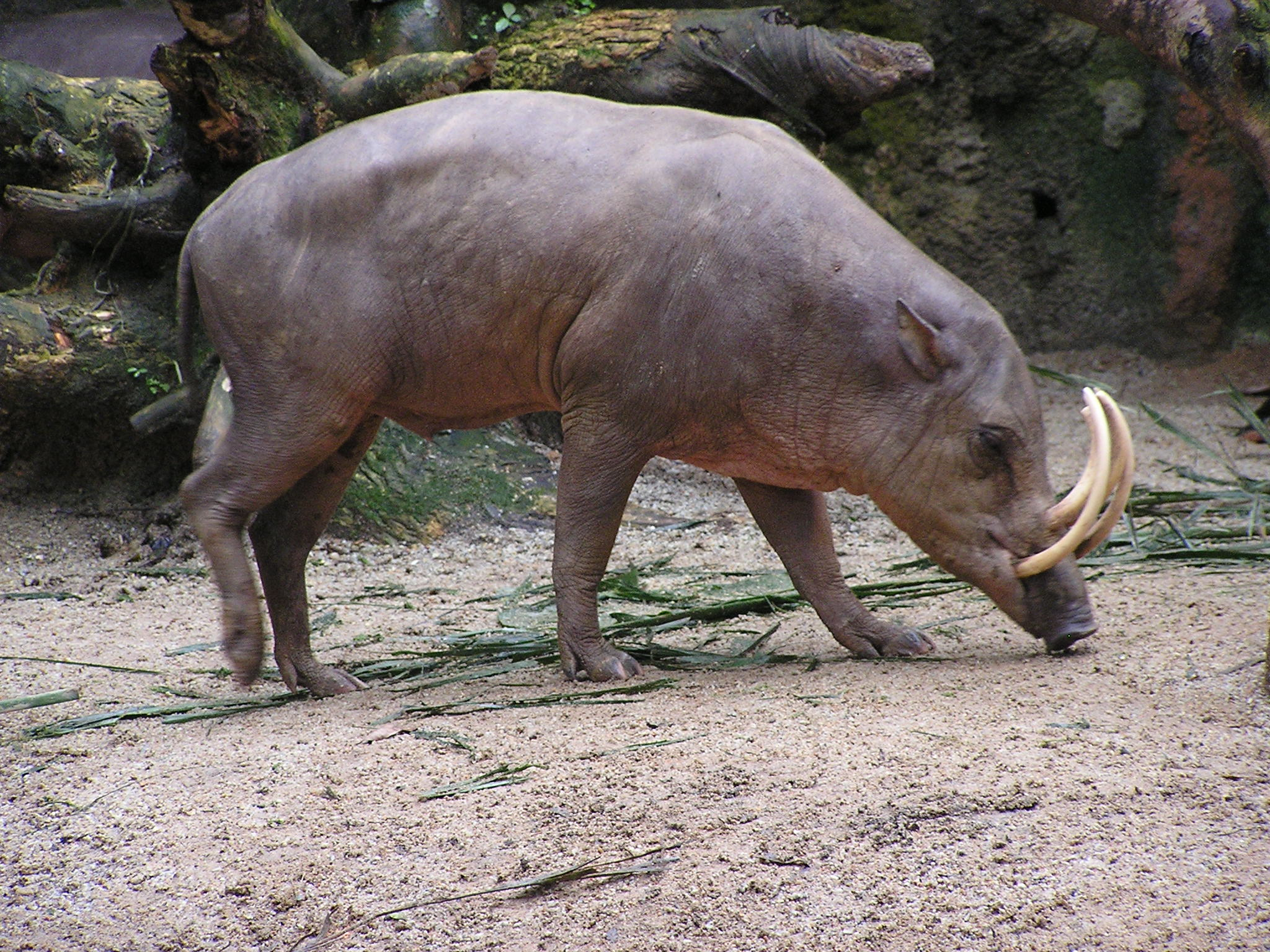
The canines of Suina (here, a babirusa pig) develop into tusks.

Dental formula		I	C	P	M
30–44	=	0–3	0–1	2–4	3
30–44	=	1–3	1	2–4	3

There are two trends in terms of teeth within Artiodactyla. The Suina and hippopotamuses have a relatively large number of teeth (with some pigs having 44); their dentition is more adapted to a squeezing mastication, which is characteristic of omnivores. Cetaceans have an increased number of teeth that are uniformly shaped and present only in a single generation, due to their loss of mastication. Camels and ruminants have fewer teeth; there is often a yawning diastema, a designated gap in the teeth where the molars are aligned for crushing plant matter.

The incisors are often reduced in ruminants, and are completely absent in the upper jaw. The canines are enlarged and tusk-like in the Suina, and are used for digging in the ground and for defense. In ruminants, the males' upper canines are enlarged and used as a weapon in certain species (mouse deer, musk deer, water deer); species with frontal weapons are usually missing the upper canines. The lower canines of ruminants resemble the incisors, so that these animals have eight uniform teeth in the frontal part of the lower jaw.

The molars of porcine have only a few bumps. In contrast, camels and ruminants have bumps that are crescent-shaped cusps (selenodont).

Artiodactyl teeth exhibit significant intraspecific variation, with the width of the M^{3} and M_{3} and the length of the M^{1} and M_{1} being the most common variations in their molars. Their premolar rows also show variation, as those teeth are prone to replication, rotation, and absence.

==== Senses ====
Artiodactyls have a well-developed sense of smell and sense of hearing. Unlike many other mammals, they have a poor sense of sight, and find moving objects much easier to see than stationary ones. Similar to many other prey animals, their eyes are on the sides of the head, giving them an almost panoramic view. Cetaceans have more complex eye movements, giving smaller whales and dolphins a more binocular field of vision.

=== Digestive system ===
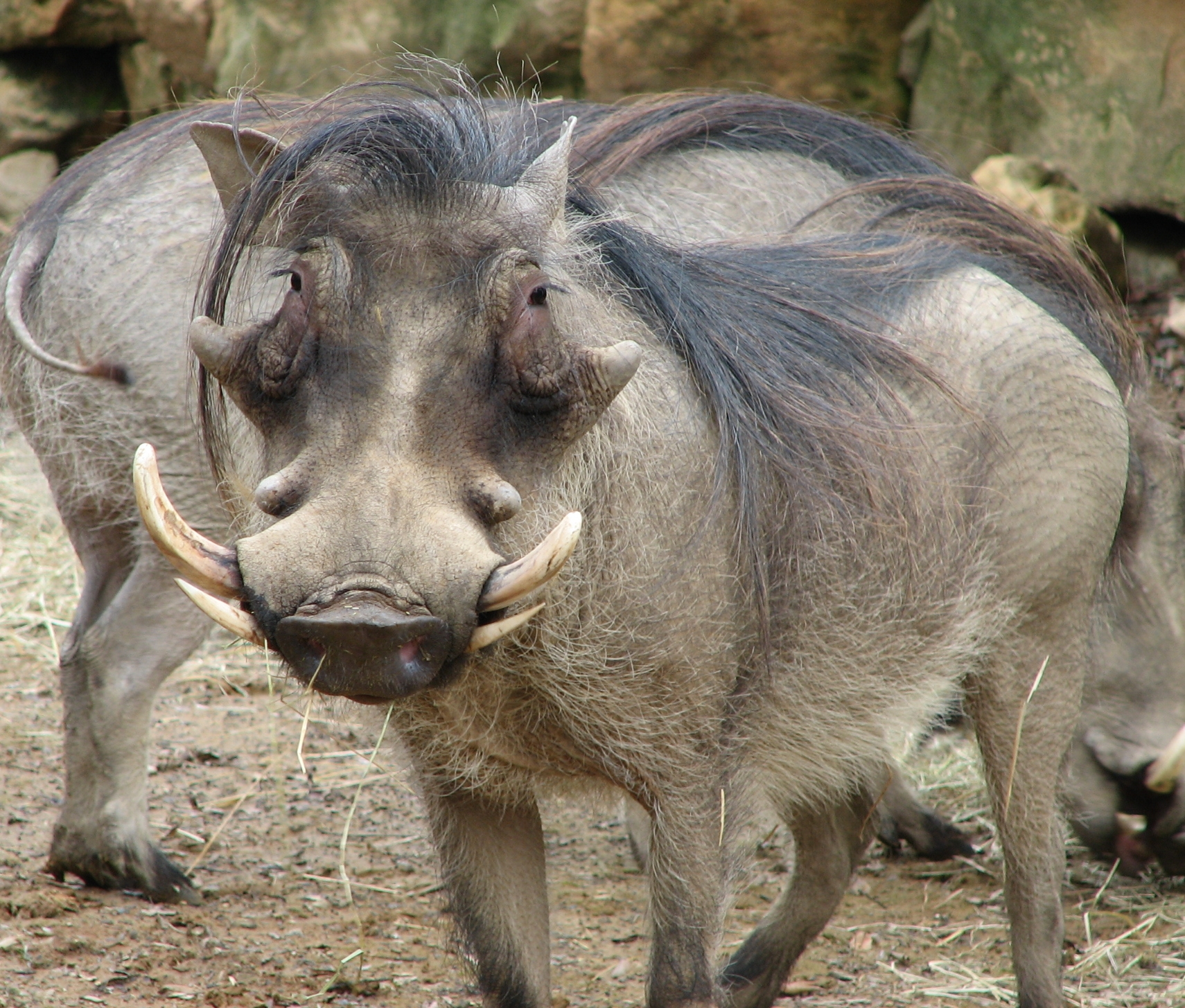
Pigs, such as this common warthog, have a simple sack-shaped stomach.

The ruminants (Ruminantia) ruminate their food, regurgitating and re-chewing it. Ruminants' mouths often have additional salivary glands, and the oral mucosa is often heavily calloused to avoid injury from hard plant parts and to allow easier transport of roughly chewed food. Their stomachs are divided into three to four sections: the rumen, the reticulum, the omasum, and the abomasum. After the food is ingested, it is mixed with saliva in the rumen and reticulum and separates into layers of solid versus liquid material. The solids lump together to form a bolus (also known as the cud); this is regurgitated by reticular contractions while the glottis is closed. When the bolus enters the mouth, the fluid is squeezed out with the tongue and re-swallowed. The bolus is chewed slowly to completely mix it with saliva and to break it down. Ingested food passes to the "fermentation chamber" (rumen and reticulum), where it is kept in continual motion by rhythmic contractions. Cellulytic microbes (bacteria, protozoa, and fungi) produce cellulase, which is needed to break down the cellulose found in plant material. This form of digestion has two advantages: plants that are indigestible to other species can be digested and used, and the duration of the actual food consumption shortened; the animal spends only a short time out in the open with its head to the ground; rumination can take place later, in a sheltered area.

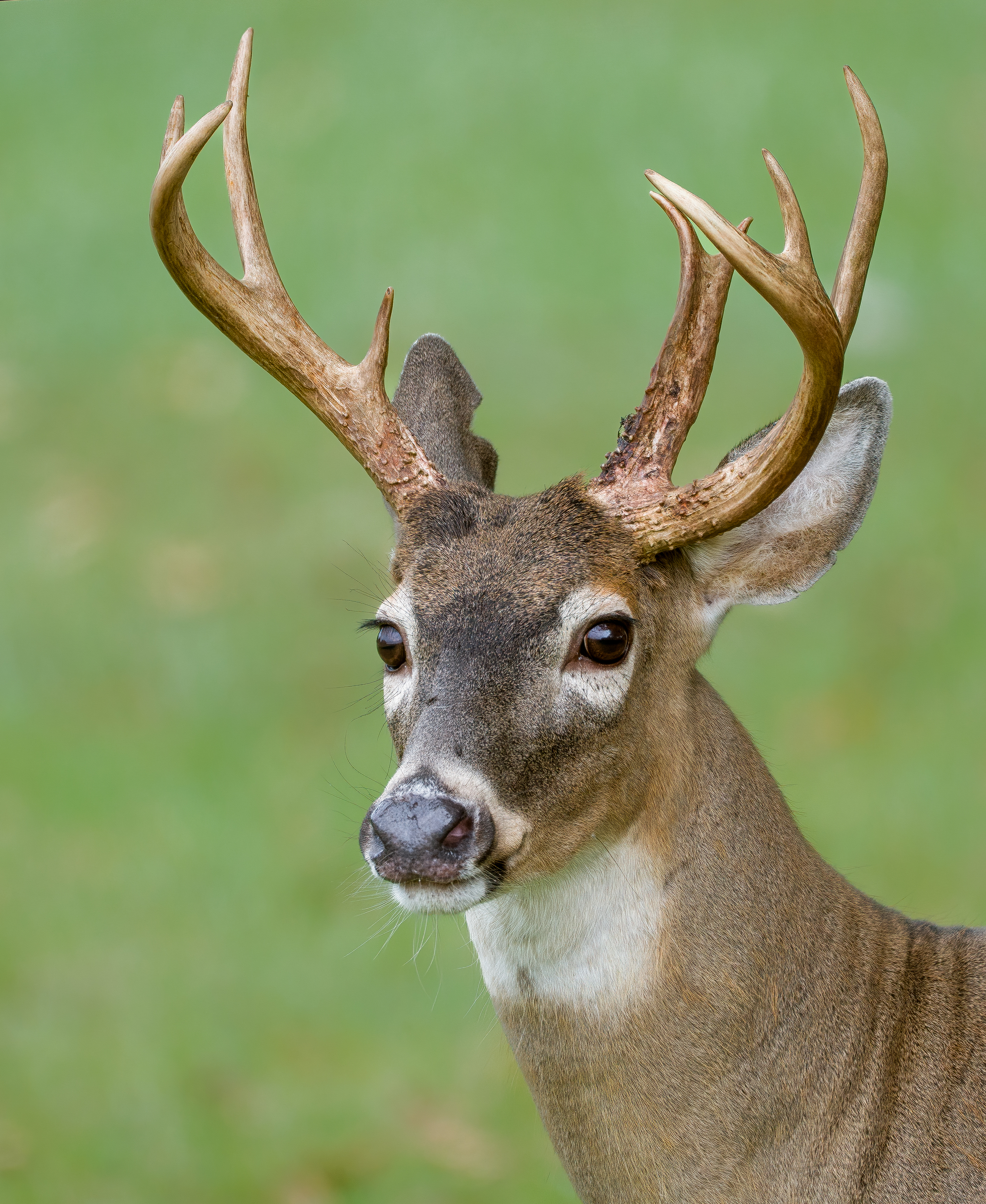
As with all ruminants, deer have such a multi-chambered stomach, which is used for better digestion of plant food.

Tylopoda (camels, llamas, and alpacas) and chevrotains have three-chambered stomachs, while the rest of Ruminantia have four-chambered stomachs. The handicap of a heavy digestive system has increased selective pressure towards limbs that allow the animal to quickly escape predators. Most species within Suina have a simple two-chambered stomach that allows for an omnivorous diet. The babirusa, however, is a herbivore, and has extra maxillary teeth to allow for proper mastication of plant material. Most of the fermentation occurs with the help of cellulolytic microorganisms within the caecum of the large intestine. Peccaries have a complex stomach that contains four compartments. Their fore stomach has fermentation carried out by microbes and has high levels of volatile fatty acid; it has been proposed that their complex fore-stomach is a means to slow digestive passage and increase digestive efficiency. Hippopotamuses have three-chambered stomachs and do not ruminate. They consume around 68 kilograms (150 lb) of grass and other plant matter each night. They may cover distances up to 32 kilometers (20 mi) to obtain food, which they digest with the help of microbes that produce cellulase. Their closest living relatives, the whales, are obligate carnivores.

Unlike other even-toed ungulates, pigs have a simple sack-shaped stomach. Some artiodactyls, such as white-tailed deer, lack a gall bladder.

=== Genitourinary system ===
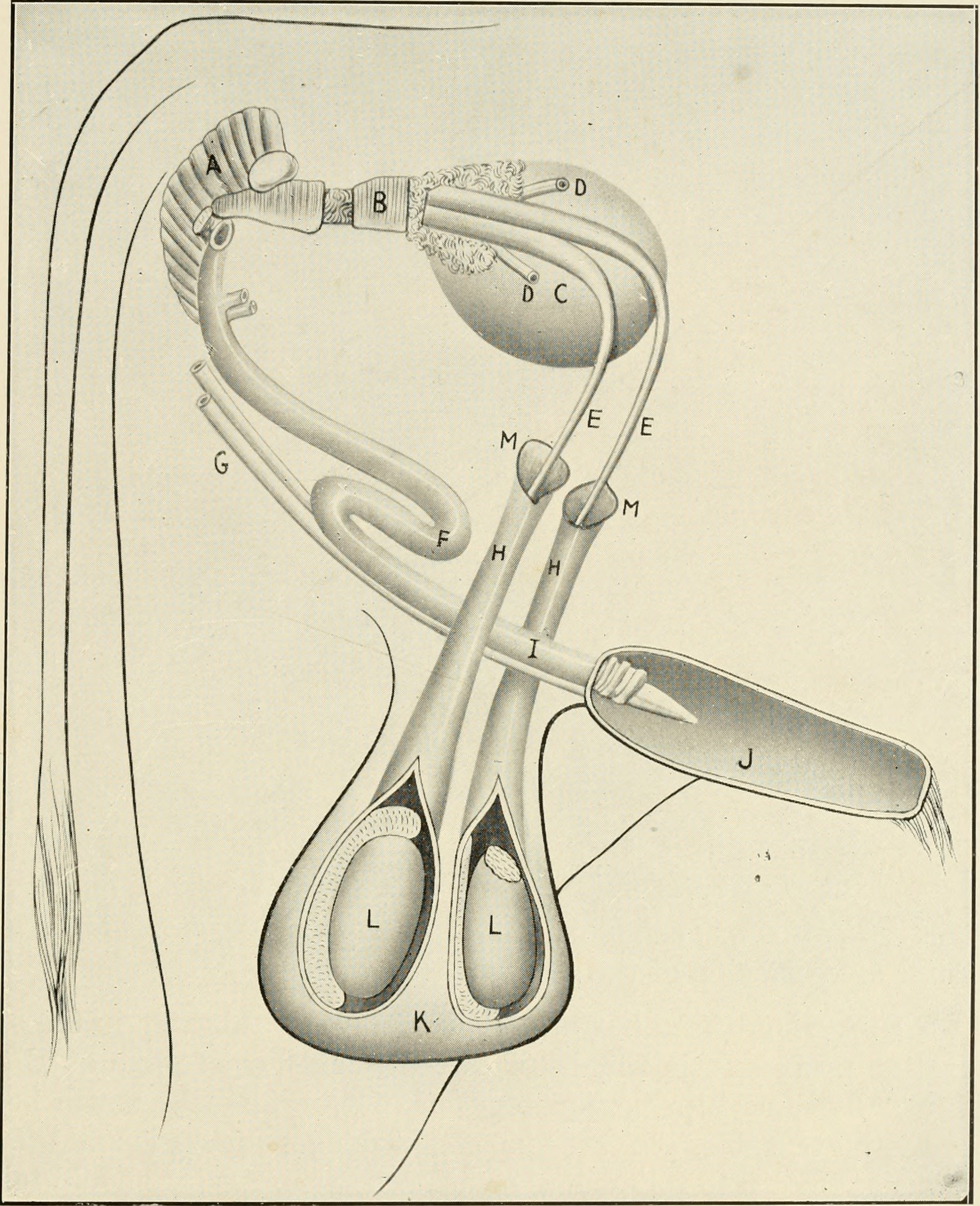
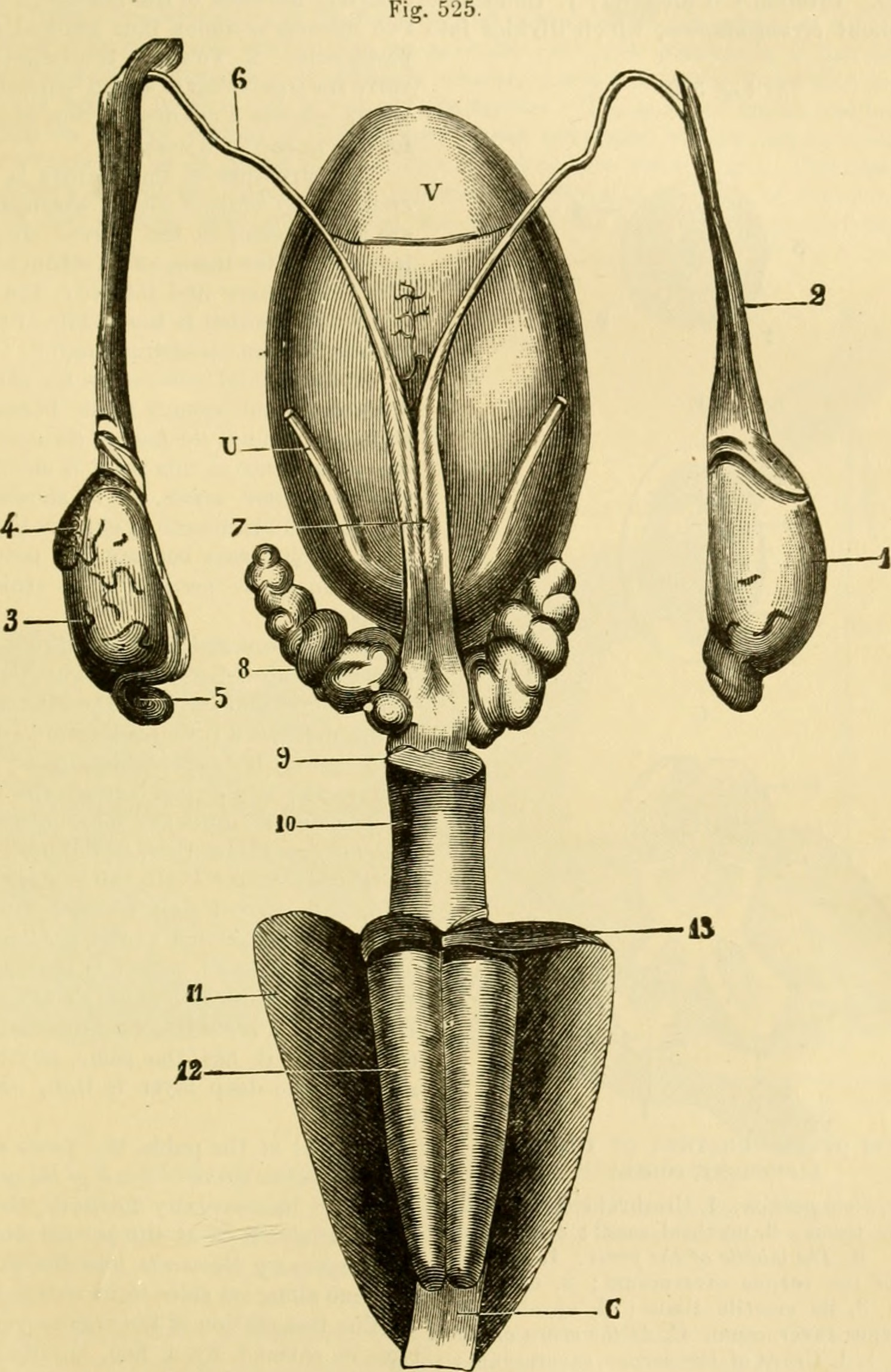
Genitourinary system of a bull

The penises of even-toed ungulates have an S-shape at rest and lie in a pocket under the skin on the belly. The corpora cavernosa are only slightly developed; and an erection mainly causes this curvature to extend, which leads to an extension, but not a thickening, of the penis. Cetaceans have similar penises. In some even-toed ungulates, the penis contains a structure called the urethral process or penile vermiform appendix.

The testicles are located in the scrotum and thus outside the abdominal cavity. The ovaries of many females descend as the testicles descend of many male mammals, and are close to the pelvic inlet at the level of the fourth lumbar vertebra. The uterus has two horns (uterus bicornis).

=== Other ===
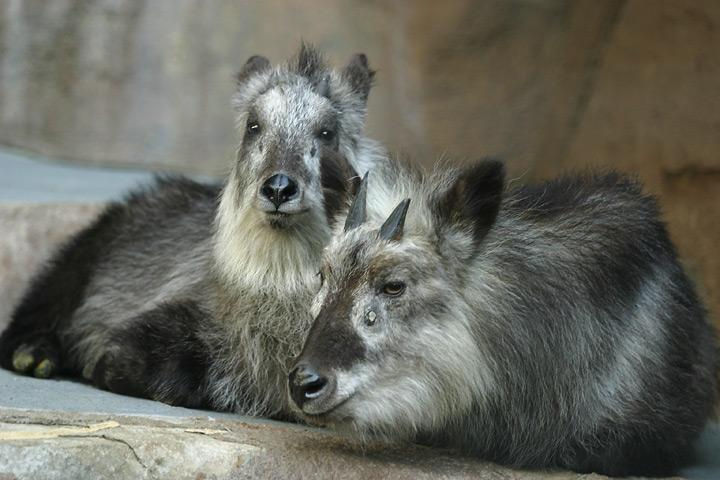
The Japanese serow has glands in the eyes that are clearly visible.

The number of mammary glands is variable and correlates, as in all mammals, with litter size. Pigs, which have the largest litter size of all even-toed ungulates, have two rows of teats lined from the armpit to the groin area. In most cases, however, even-toed ungulates have only one or two pairs of teats. In some species these form an udder in the groin region.

Secretory glands in the skin are present in virtually all species and can be located in different places, such as in the eyes, behind the horns, the neck, or back, on the feet, or in the anal region.

Artiodactyls have a carotid rete heat exchange that enables them, unlike perissodactyls which lack one, to regulate their brain temperature independently of their bodies. It has been argued that its presence explains the greater success of artiodactyls compared to perissodactyls in being able to adapt to diverse environments from the Arctic Circle to deserts and tropical savannahs.

== Lifestyle ==
=== Distribution and habitat ===
Artiodactyls are native to almost all parts of the world, with the exception of Oceania and Antarctica. Humans have introduced different artiodactyls worldwide as hunting animals. Artiodactyls inhabit almost every habitat, from tropical rainforests and steppes to deserts and high mountain regions. The greatest biodiversity prevails in open habitats such as grasslands and open forests.

=== Social behavior ===
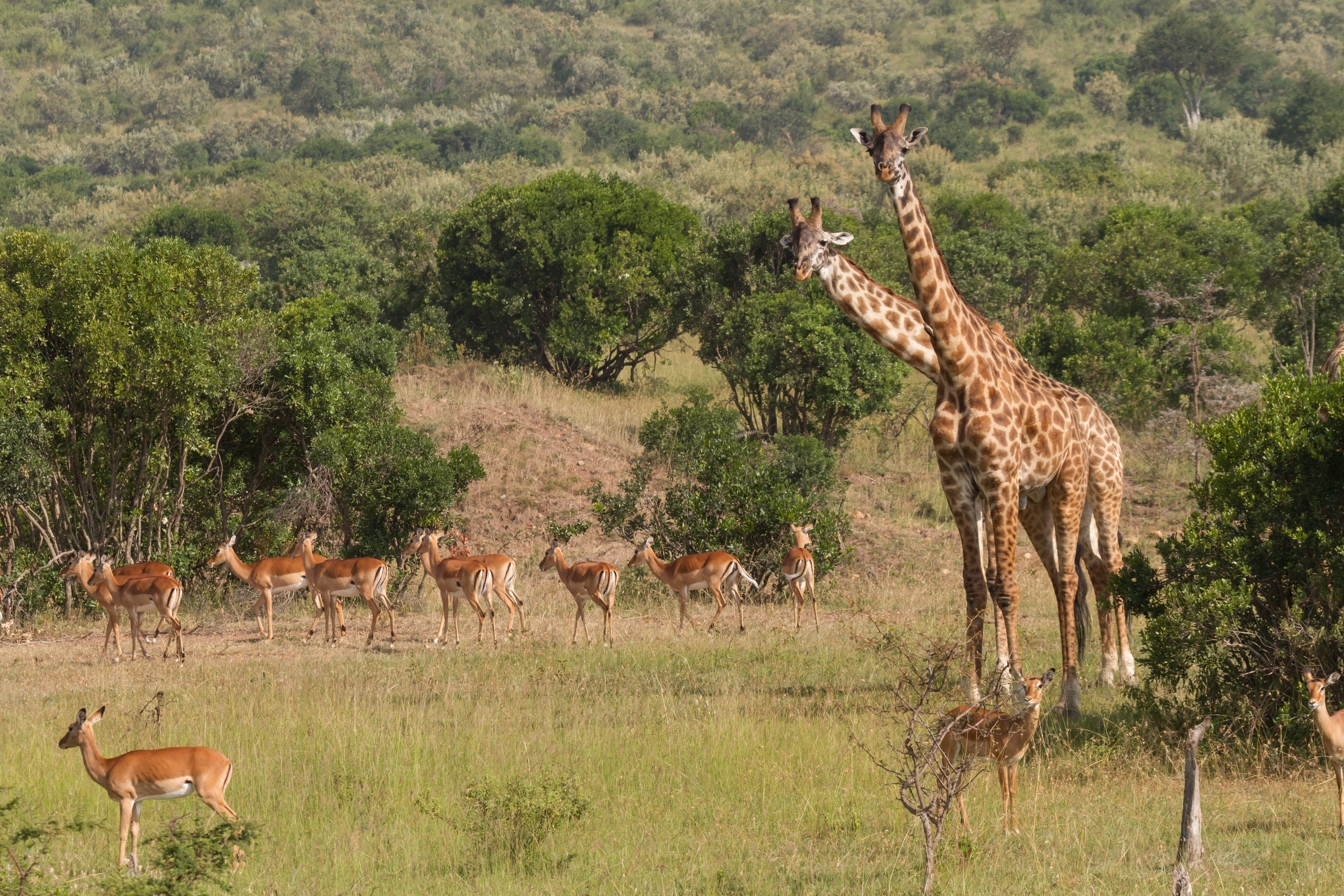
Artiodactyls, like impalas and giraffes, live in groups.

The social behavior of even-toed ungulates varies from species to species. Generally, there is a tendency to merge into larger groups, but some live alone or in pairs. Species living in groups often have a hierarchy, both among males and females. Some species also live in harem groups, with one male, several females, and their common offspring. In other species, the females and juveniles stay together, while males are solitary or live in bachelor groups and seek out females only during mating season.

Many artiodactyls are territorial and mark their territory, for example, with glandular secretions or urine. In addition to year-round sedentary species, there are animals that migrate seasonally.

There are diurnal, crepuscular, and nocturnal artiodactyls. Some species' pattern of wakefulness varies with season or habitat.

=== Reproduction and life expectancy ===
Generally, even-toed ungulates tend to have long gestation periods, smaller litter sizes, and more highly developed newborns. As with many other mammals, species in temperate or polar regions have a fixed mating season, while those in tropical areas breed year-round. They carry out polygynous mating behavior, meaning a male mates with several females and suppresses all competition.

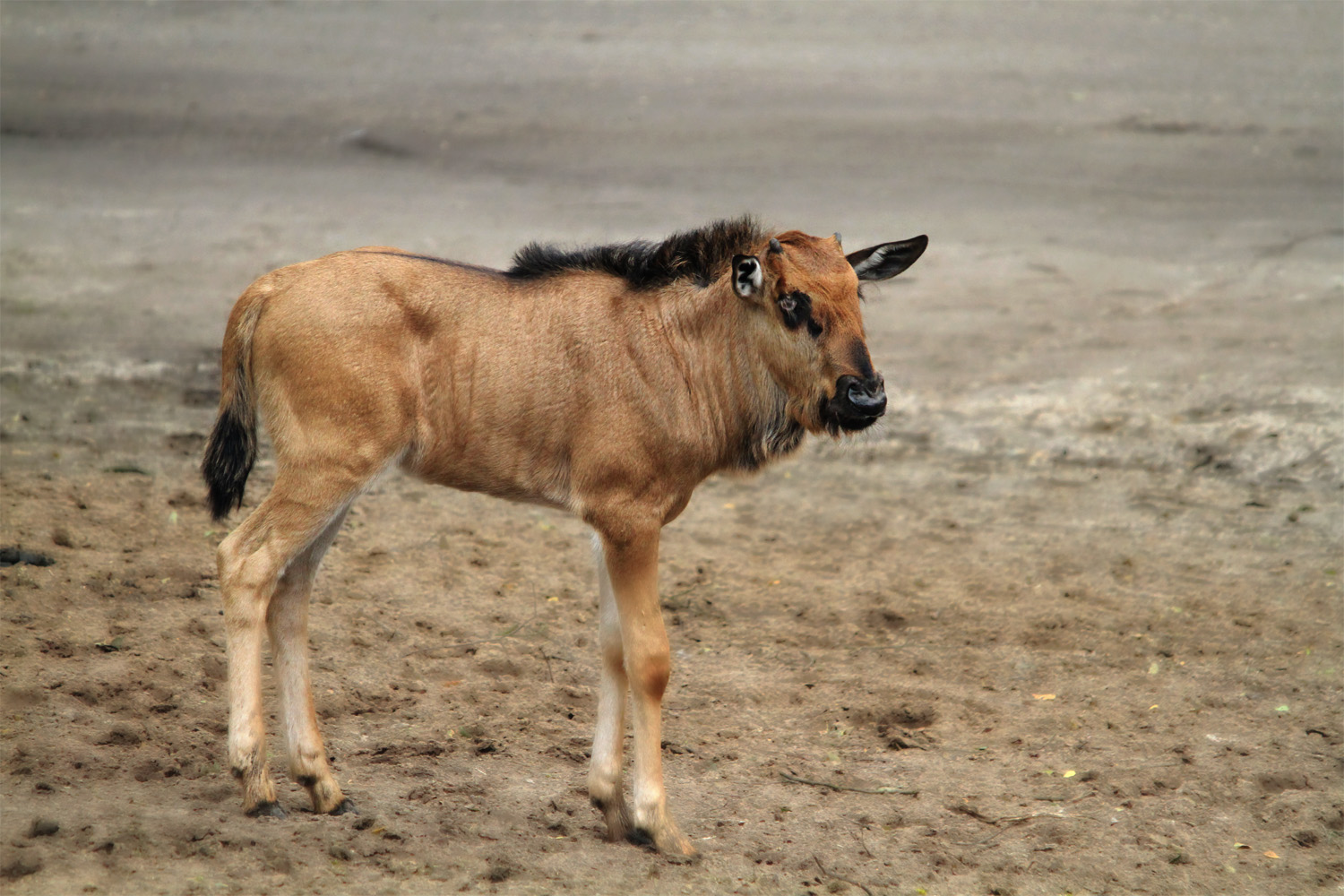
Most artiodactyls, such as the blue wildebeest, are born with hair.

The length of the gestation period varies from four to five months for pigs, deer, and musk deer; six to ten months for hippos, deer, and bovines; ten to thirteen months with camels; and fourteen to fifteen months with giraffes. Most deliver one or two babies, but some pigs can deliver up to ten.

The newborns are precocial (born relatively mature) and come with open eyes and are hairy (with the exception of the hairless hippos). Juvenile deer and pigs have striped or spotted coats; the pattern disappears as they grow older. The juveniles of some species spend their first weeks with their mother in a safe location, where others may be running and following the herd within a few hours or days.

Life expectancy is typically twenty to thirty years; as in many mammals, smaller species often have a shorter lifespan than larger species. The artiodactyls with the longest lifespans are the hippos, cows, and camels, which can live 40 to 50 years.

=== Predators and parasites ===
Artiodactyls have different natural predators depending on their size and habitat. There are several carnivores that prey on them, including large cats (lions, tigers, and relatives) and bears. Other predators are crocodiles, wolves and dogs, large raptors, and for small species and young animals, large snakes. For cetaceans, possible predators include sharks, polar bears, and other cetaceans; in the latter is the orca, the top predator of the oceans.

Parasites include nematodes, botflies, fleas, lice, or flukes, but they have debilitating effects only when the infestation is severe.

== Interactions with humans ==
=== Domestication ===
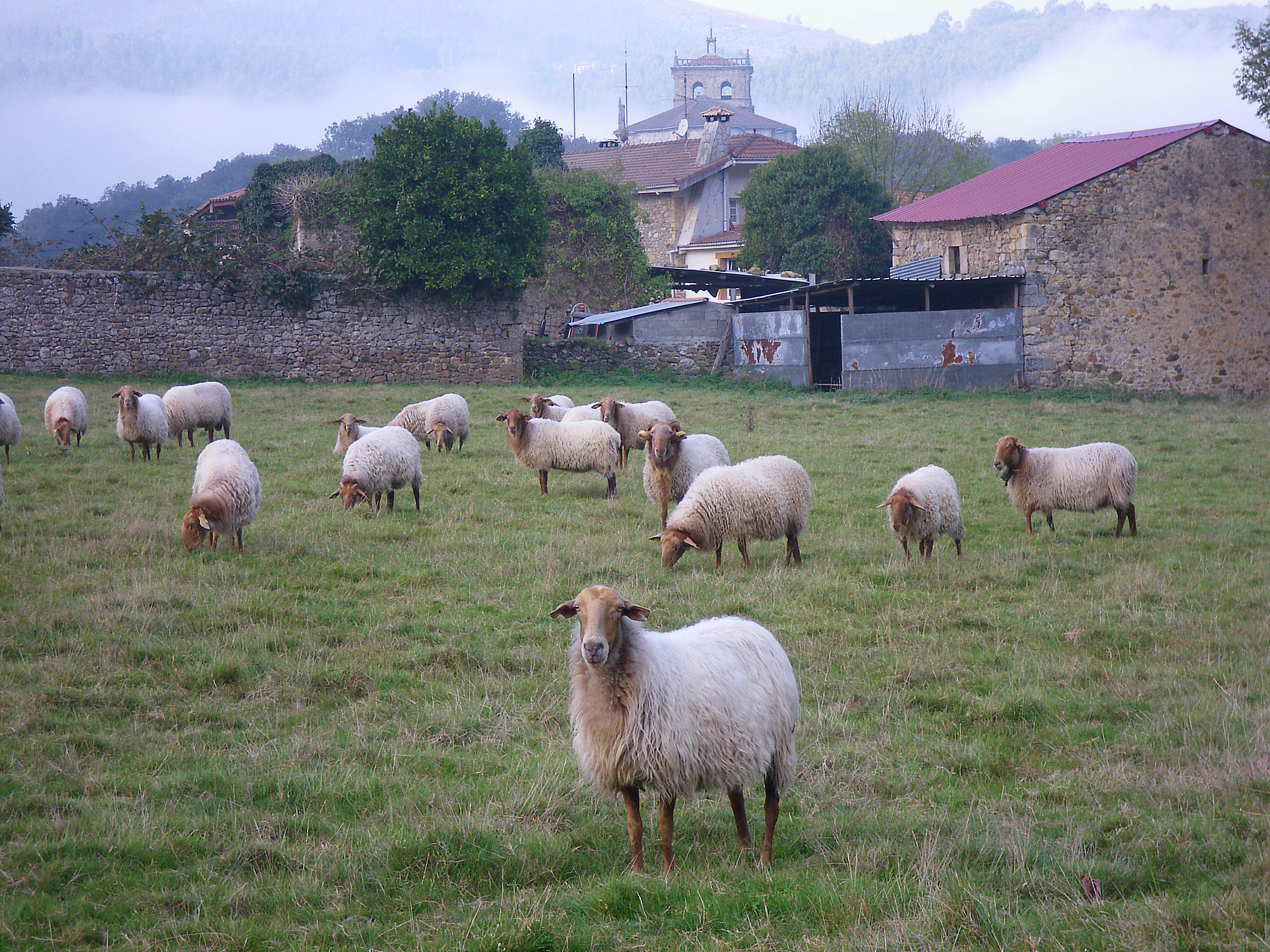
Some artiodactyls, like sheep, have been domesticated for thousands of years.

Artiodactyls have been hunted by primitive humans for various reasons: for meat or fur, as well as to use their bones and teeth as weapons or tools. Their domestication began around 8000 BCE. To date, humans have domesticated goats, sheep, cattle, camels, llamas, alpacas, and pigs. Initially, livestock was used primarily for food, but they began being used for work activities around 3000 BCE. Clear evidence exists of antelope being used for food 2 million years ago in the Olduvai Gorge, part of the Great Rift Valley. Cro-Magnons relied heavily on reindeer for food, skins, tools, and weapons; with dropping temperatures and increased reindeer numbers at the end of the Pleistocene, they became the prey of choice. Reindeer remains accounted for 94% of bones and teeth found in a cave above the river Céou that was inhabited around 12,500 years ago. In general, most even-toed ungulates can be consumed as a kosher meat, with the principal exception of Suina (pigs, etc.) and hippopotamids, which are even-toed but do not chew the cud, and of Cetacea, which, for the purpose of rabbinic law, are considered to be scaleless fish, and thus not kosher.

Today, artiodactyls are kept primarily for their meat, milk, and wool, fur, or hide for clothing. Domestic cattle, the water buffalo, the yak, and camels are used for work, as rides, or as pack animals.

=== Threats ===
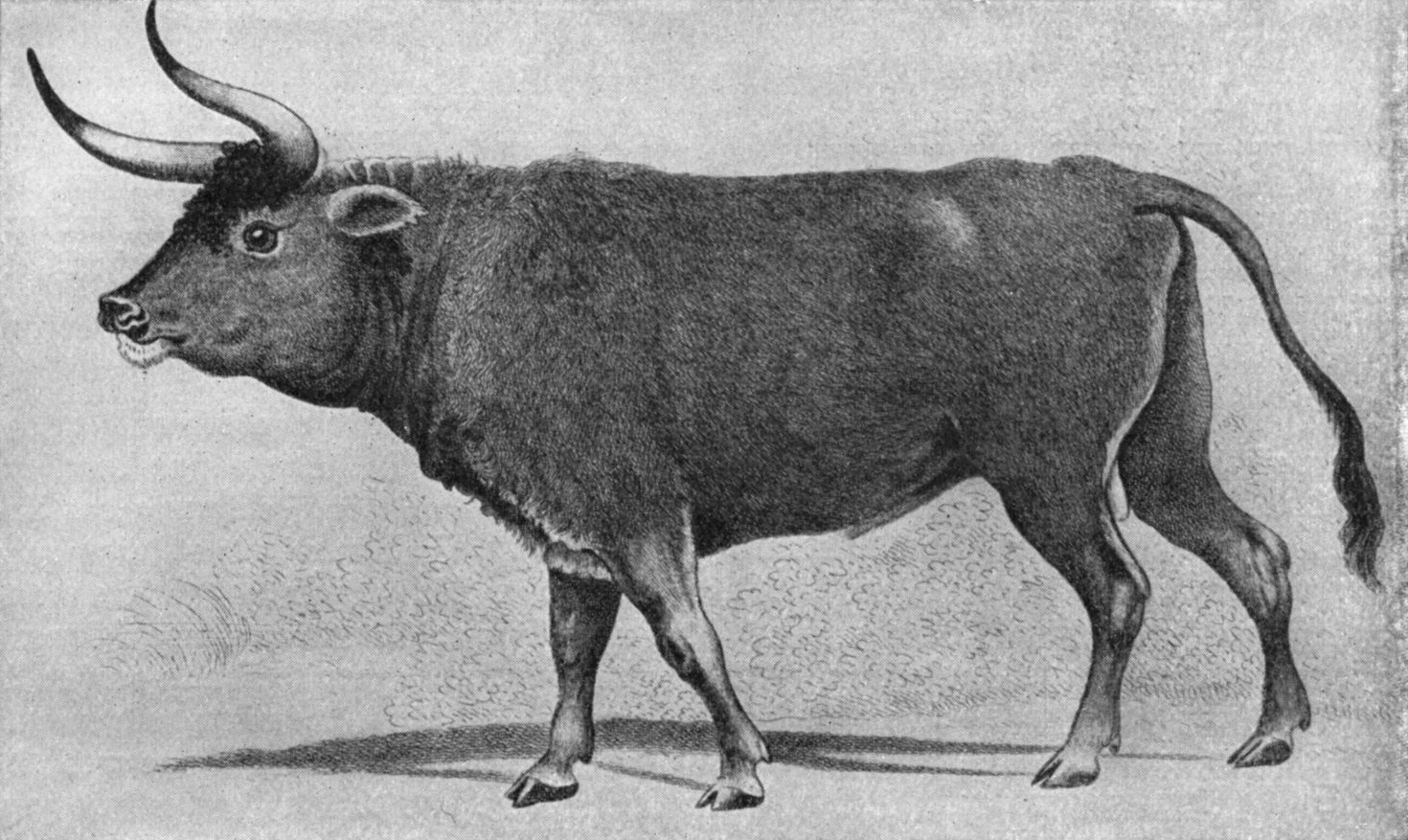
The aurochs has been extinct since the 17th century.

The endangerment level of each even-toed ungulate is different. Some species are synanthropic (such as the wild boar) and have spread into areas that they are not indigenous to, either having been brought in as farm animals or having run away as people's pets. Some artiodactyls also benefit from the fact that their predators (e.g., the Tasmanian tiger) were severely decimated by ranchers, who saw them as competition.

Conversely, many artiodactyls have declined significantly in numbers, and some have even gone extinct, largely due to over-hunting, and, more recently, habitat destruction. Extinct species include several gazelles, the aurochs, the Malagasy hippopotamus, the bluebuck, and Schomburgk's deer. One species, the Père David's deer, is extinct in the wild, after the successful reintroduction of the scimitar-horned oryx. Fourteen species are considered critically endangered, including the addax, and possibly extinct kouprey. 24 species are considered endangered, such as the wild Bactrian camel, Przewalski's gazelle, and the pygmy hog.
