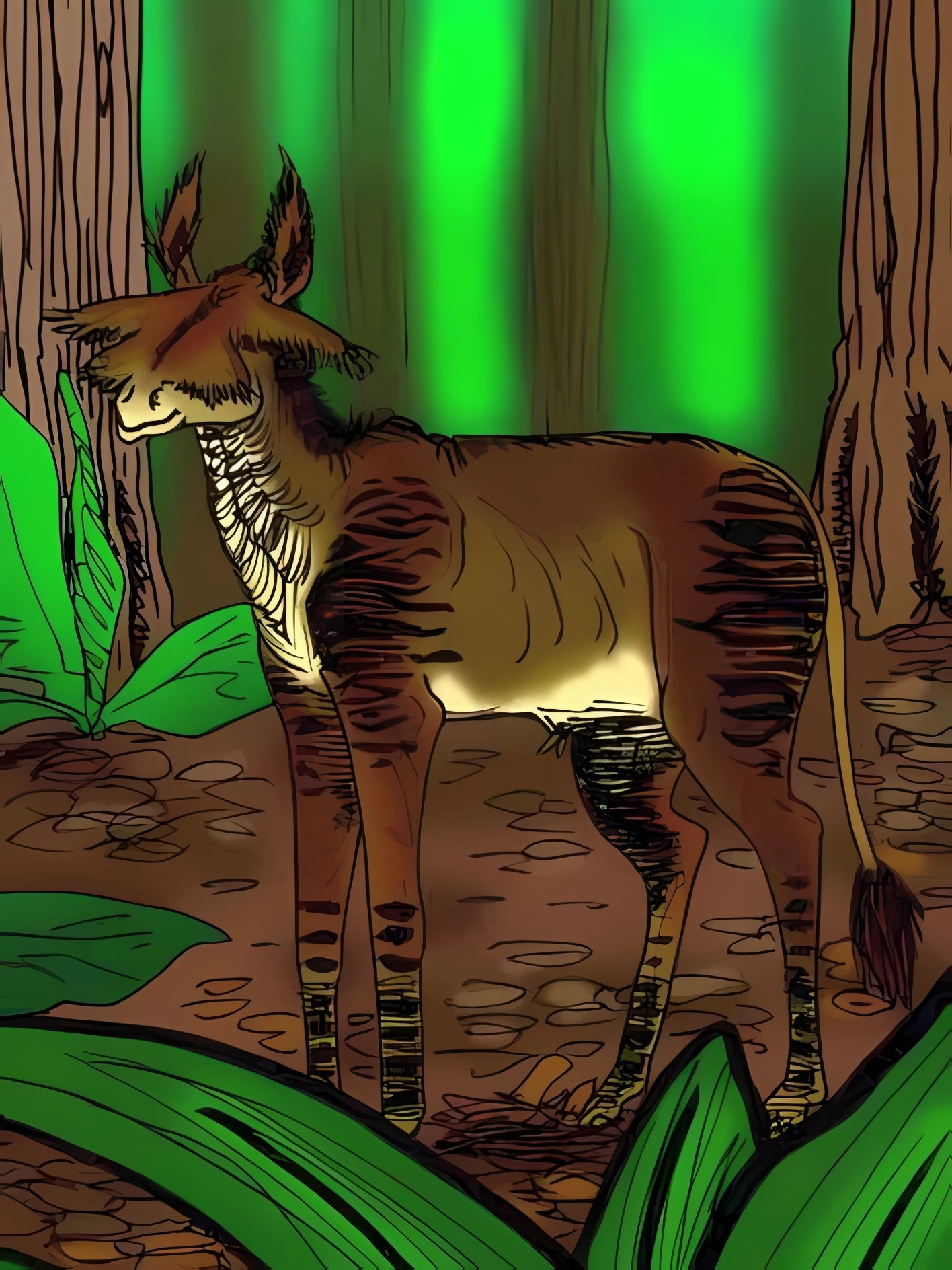
- I. arabicum

Scientific classification
- Kingdom: Animalia
- Phylum: Chordata
- Class: Mammalia
- Order: Artiodactyla
- Family: Giraffidae
- Genus: †Injanatherium; Heintz, 1981

Type species
- Injanatherium hazimi

= Injanatherium =

Injanatherium Temporal range: Early to Middle Miocene

Extinct genus of mammals

Injanatherium is an extinct genus of giraffids from the Miocene of Iraq, Saudi Arabia, and Pakistan. Species of Injanatherium had at least two pairs of long, wing-like ossicones that emanated laterally above the orbits.

== Species ==
=== I. hazimi ===
I. hazimi is the type species, originally described by Heintz, et al., in 1981, on the basis of a partial skull found in middle Miocene-aged strata of Injana, Iraq, about 140 km north of Baghdad. The ossicones are broad and more massive in comparison to I. arabicum.

=== I. arabicum ===
I. arabicum is a second species initially described from a partial skull from early Miocene-aged strata of Saudi Arabia, then later from material found in similarly aged strata from Pakistan. Its ossicones are more triangular and less massive in comparison to I. hazimi.
