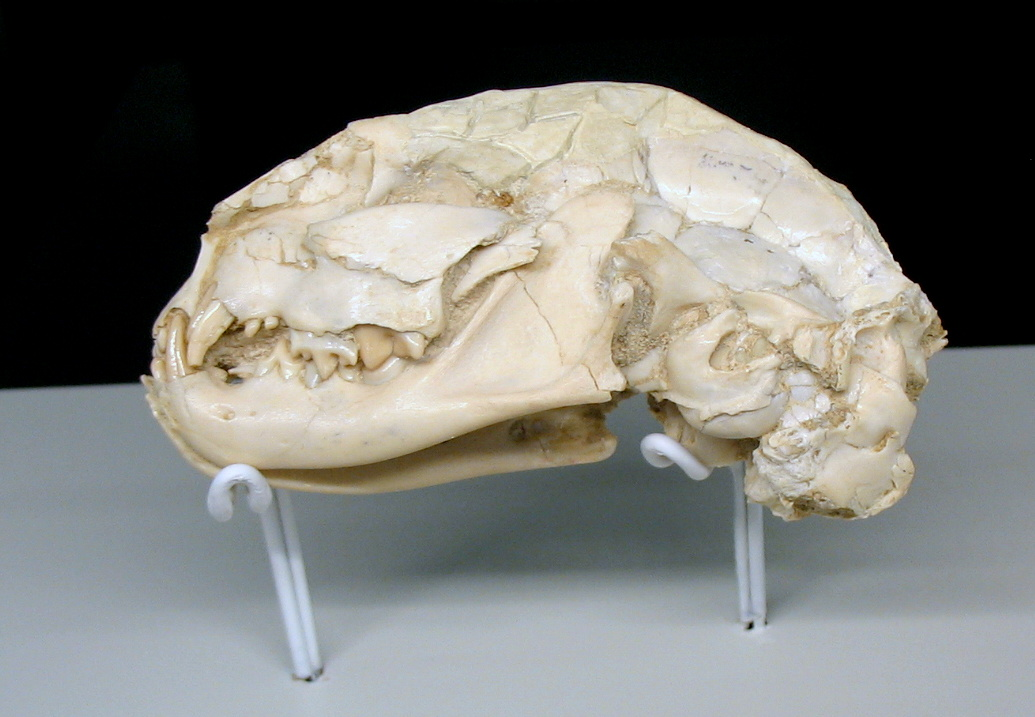
- Skull from Batallones-1 fossil site

Scientific classification
- Kingdom: Animalia
- Phylum: Chordata
- Class: Mammalia
- Order: Carnivora
- Family: Felidae
- Subfamily: Felinae
- Genus: †Leptofelis; Salesa et al., 2017

Type species
- Leptofelis vallesiensis (Salesa et al., 2012)

Synonyms
- Styriofelis vallesiensis

= Leptofelis =

Leptofelis Temporal range: Late Vallesian

Extinct genus of carnivores

Leptofelis is an extinct genus of Pseudaelurus-grade felid found in Spain.

== Etymology ==
The generic name Leptofelis comes from the Latin words for swift, lepto, and cat, felis, essentially translating to "swift cat". The specific name vallesiensis was given because the species was found in localities of Vallesian age.

== Taxonomy and phylogeny ==
Leptofelis vallesiensis was first described as Styriofelis vallesiensis in 2012, based on several specimens from Batallones-1 and Batallones-3, a pair of Vallesian-age localities in Spain. The specimens included a partial but well-preserved skeleton and several skulls. However, a review of the species in 2017 concluded that it was sufficiently different from other Styriofelis species as to warrant a new genus, and was therefore reassigned as Leptofelis vallesiensis.

== Description ==
Leptofelis vallesiensis is theorized to have had long and slender legs, and to weigh between 7.21–9.02 kg (15.9–19.9 lb), similar in size to a caracal or serval. It had certain adaptations intermediate between earlier felids, which were mostly arboreal or semi-arboreal, and later felids that lived mainly on the ground. Because of this, L. vallesiensis is theorized to have been mainly ground-living, though still climbing trees to escape.

== Paleoecology ==
Leptofelis seemed to prefer open woodland habitat, as evidenced by finds at Cerro de los Batallones. As a predator at Batallones, it would have hunted small rodents, birds and other easily subdued animals. This cat was contemporaneous with such herbivores as horses like Hipparion, the hornless rhinoceros Aceratherium, the gomphotherid mastodon Tetralophodon, the suid Microstonyx, silvatherid giraffes and boselaphine antelope. Leptofelis was also contemporary with the Amphicyonid Magericyon, machairodonts Machairodus, Promegantereon, and Paramachairodus, the bear Indarctos, and the small hyenid Protictitherium. All these carnivores were competition and with smaller animals like Protictitherium, it would have competed directly against it. The larger carnivores were avoided, either by escaping up trees or through evasion and stealth. The environment of Batallones was a highly variable habitat, with scattered vegetation throughout open areas of grassland. These areas would provide both the necessary protection and ambush sites necessary to hunt successfully.
