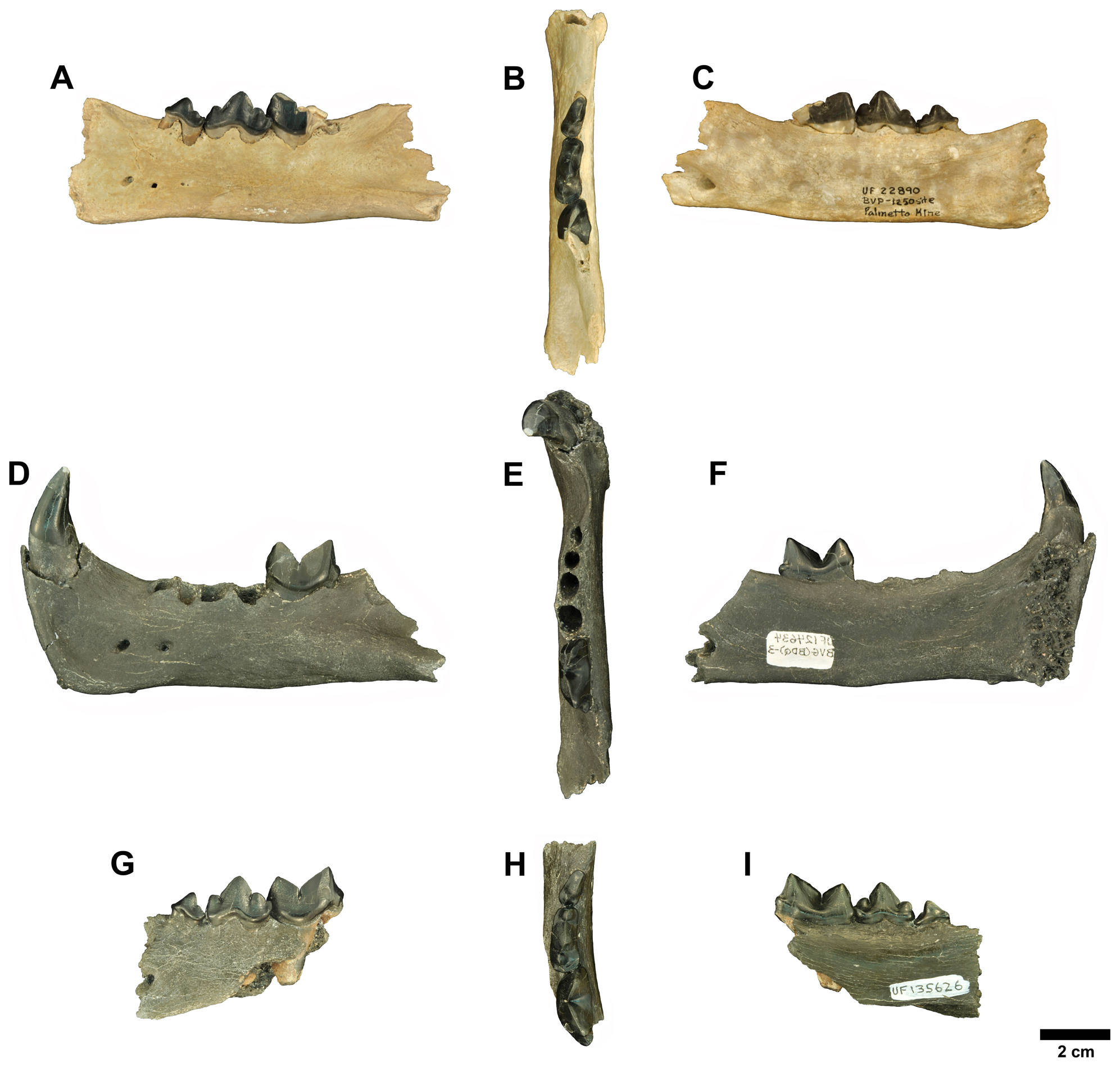
- Fossil specimens

Scientific classification
- Kingdom: Animalia
- Phylum: Chordata
- Class: Mammalia
- Order: Carnivora
- Family: Felidae
- Subfamily: †Machairodontinae
- Tribe: †Smilodontini
- Genus: †Rhizosmilodon; Wallace & Hulbert, 2013

Type species
- Rhizosmilodon fiteae Wallace & Hulbert, 2013

= Rhizosmilodon =

Rhizosmilodon Temporal range: Late Miocene to Early Pliocene, 5.3–4.5 Ma

Extinct genus of carnivores

Rhizosmilodon is an extinct genus of saber-tooth cat of the subfamily Machairodontinae that lived during the Early Pliocene and was discovered in the U.S. state of Florida.

== History and Naming ==
The first fossils of Rhizosmilodon were discovered in fossil beds of central Florida by Steven C. Wallace and Richard C. Hulbert Jr and described in 2013. The holotype specimen, UF 124634, consists of a single right mandible. Many bones of Rhizosmilodon have been discovered including; Teeth; mandibles; foot bones; leg bones; and a single skull. All specimens of Rhizosmilodon have only been found in Florida.

The locality of Rhizosmilodon suggests a North American origin of the Dirk-Toothed cats.

Specimens of Rhizosmilodon were originally referred under Megantereon hesperus. The Etymology of the genus name was given by Wallace & Hubert to mean "root of Smilodon", with "rhizo" meaning "root" because of the apparent ancestral relation to Smilodon. The species name "fiteae" was named in honor of Barbara Fite, who donated the paratype specimen, UF 135626, to the Florida Museum of Natural History.

== Description ==
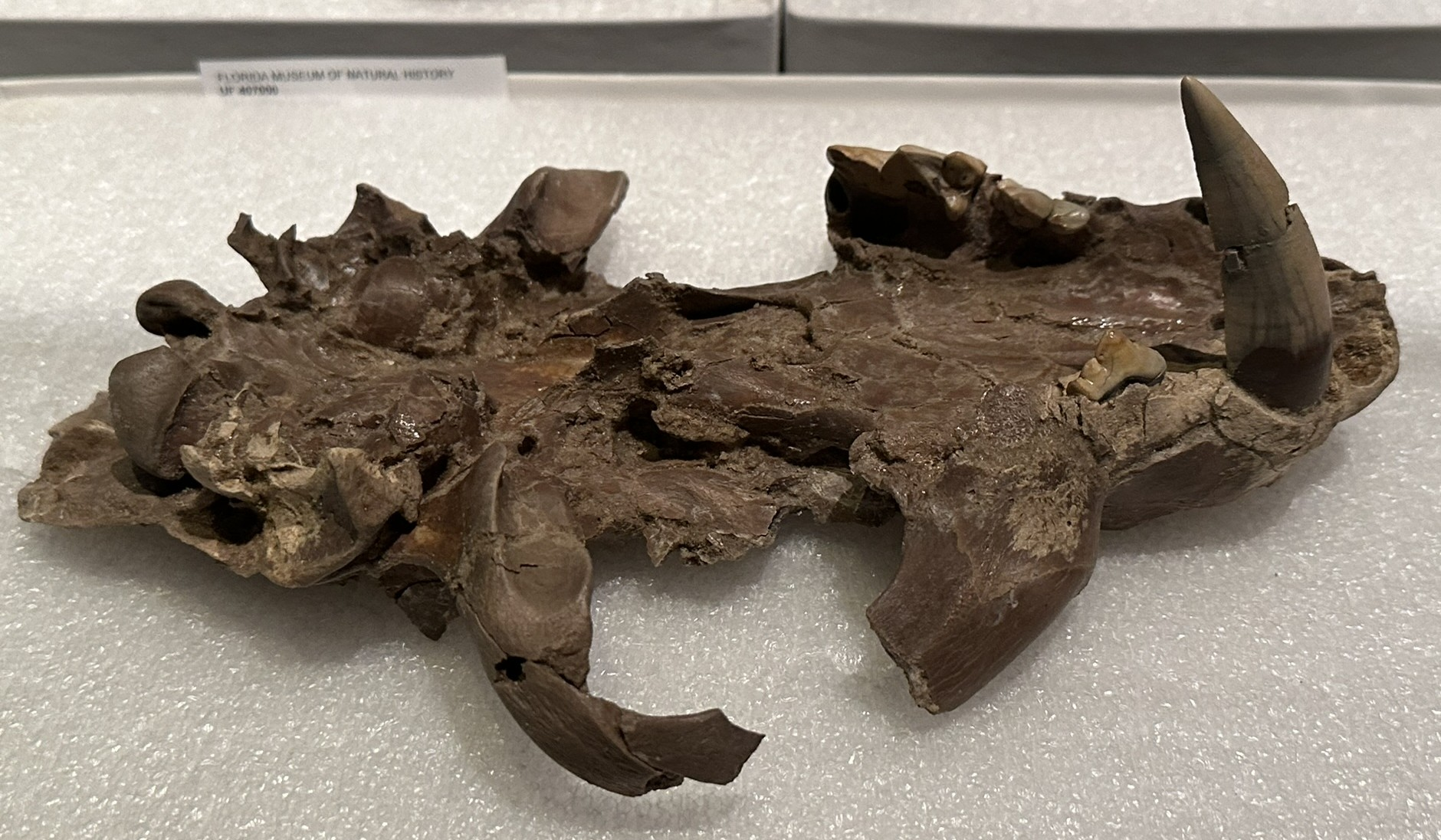
Partial skull, Florida Museum of Natural History

Comparable in size to a medium-sized modern jaguar at about 165 lb, some estimates ranging between 55.7 to 58.3 kg (122.9 to 128.5 lbs) and 76.6 to 85.0 kg (168.9 to 187.4 lbs).

Fossils of Rhizosmilodon are known only from Florida. The best specimens for this species are its lower jaw, a single skull, and teeth, which carry intermediate characteristics between advanced forms such as Smilodon and primitive forms such as Paramachairodus. Based on the mandible alone, Rhizosmilodon has the primitive traits traits: a large lower canine and a small but evident jaw flange. The derived traits include various measurements of the incisors, p3, p4, and m1 teeth, with the lower canine being laterally compressed.

Serrations only on the canine teeth support the placement of Rhizosmilodon within the tribe Smilodontini rather than the scimitar-toothed Homotherini. The severity of the serrations place Rhizosmilodon as a more ancestral genus than Megantereon and Smilodon.

It was likely an ambush predator, preying on animals such as deer, tapirs and horses. Its size and robustness would have allowed it to climb into trees.

== Phylogeny ==
Phylogenetic relationships of Rhizosmilodon with other Machairodonts based on analysis of 37 cranio-mandibular characters.

- - Proailurus lemanensis
  - Machairodontinae
    - Promegantereon ogygia
    - - Paramachaerodus
        - Paramachaerodus orientalis
        - Paramachaerodus maximiliani
      - - Smilodontini
          - Rhizosmilodon fiteae
          - - Smilodon
              - Smilodon gracilis
              - - Smilodon fatalis
                - Smilodon populator
            - Megantereon
              - Megantereon cultridens
              - Megantereon hesperus
        - Machairodontini (=Homotherini)
          - Machairodus
            - Machairodus aphanistus
            - Machairodus coloradensis
          - Homotherium serum
