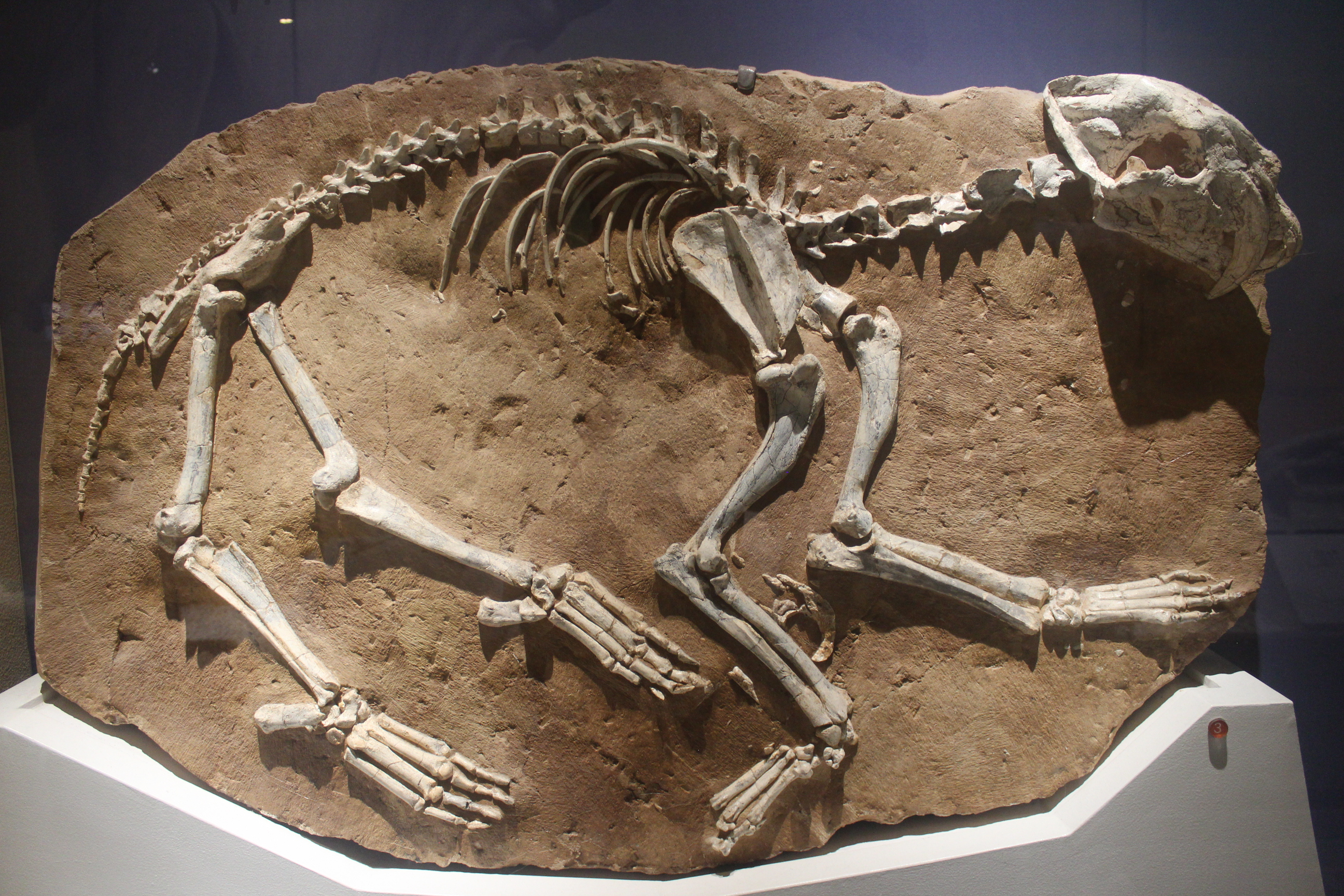
- Skeleton on display at the National Natural History Museum of China

Scientific classification
- Kingdom: Animalia
- Phylum: Chordata
- Class: Mammalia
- Infraclass: Placentalia
- Order: Carnivora
- Family: Felidae
- Subfamily: †Machairodontinae
- Tribe: †Homotherini
- Genus: †Machairodus; Kaup, 1833

Type species
- †Machairodus aphanistus Kaup, 1832

Other Species
- M. alberdiae Ginsburg et al., 1981; M. laskerevi Sotnikova, 1992; M. robinsoni Kurtén, 1975

= Machairodus =

Machairodus Temporal range: Middle to Late Miocene (Serravallian to Tortonian), 12.5–8.7 Ma

Extinct genus of saber-toothed cats

Machairodus (from Ancient Greek μάχαιρα (mákhaira), a type of ancient sword, and ὀδούς (odoús), meaning "tooth") is a genus of large machairodont or ''saber-toothed cat'' that lived in Africa and Eurasia during the Middle to Late Miocene, from 12.5 million to 8.7 million years ago. It is the animal from which the subfamily Machairodontinae gets its name. The genus currently consists of four named species: M. alberidae, M. aphanistus, M. laskerevi, and M. robinsoni. The genus is currently usually placed as one of the most basal members of the tribe Homotherini, and the ancestor of later members of the tribe, such as Amphimachairodus.

The type species of the genus, M. aphanistus, was comparable to tigers in size, weighing 117–285 kg (258–628 pounds), making it an apex predator of the ecosystems it inhabited. Much like some of its relatives such as Homotherium and Amphimachairodus, it may have been gregarious; males may have formed coalitions of two or more individuals, while females may have been solitary. It is thought to have hunted relatively large prey, such as the three-toed horse Hipparion.

== History of research and taxonomy ==
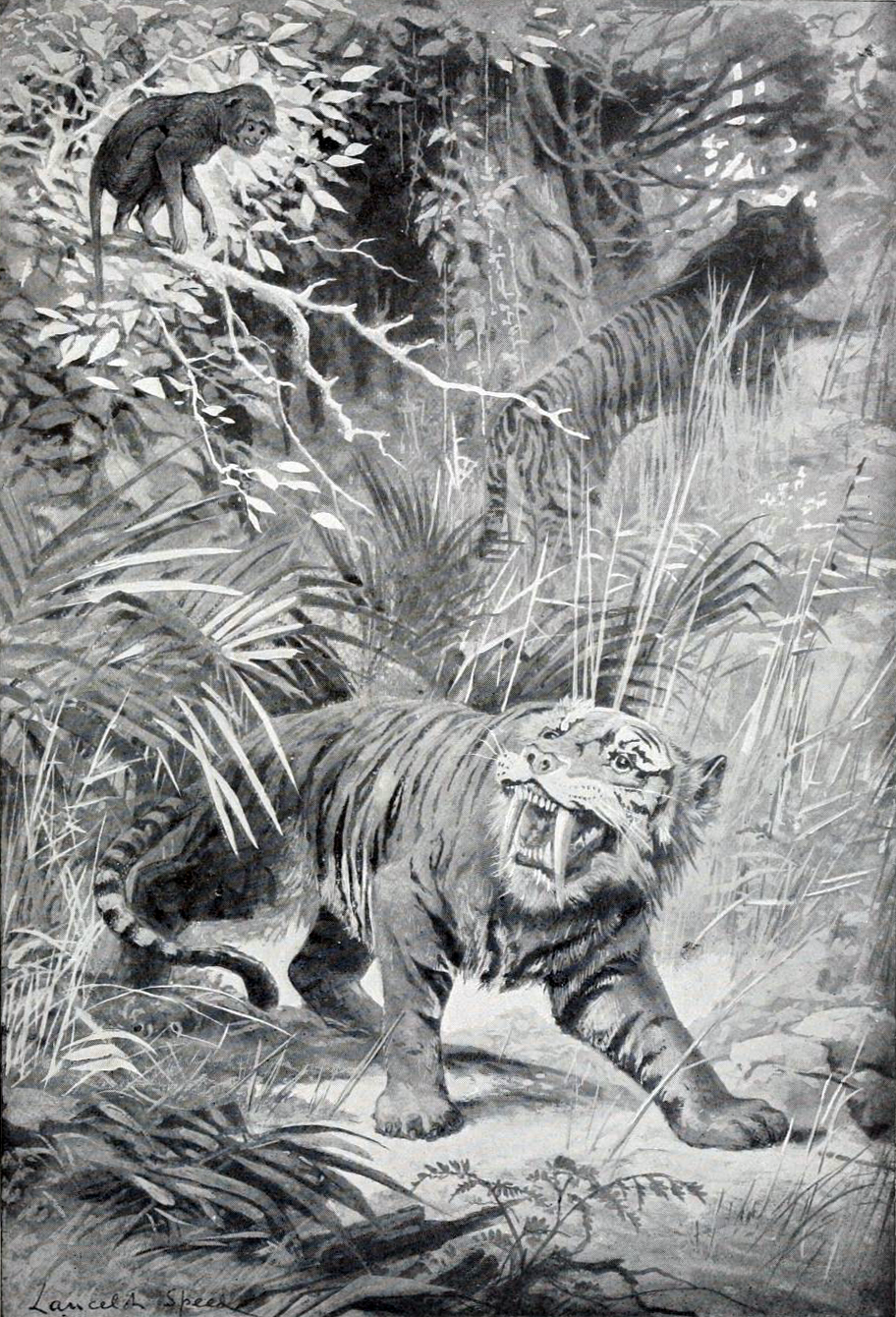
Early restoration by Lancelot Speed from 1905 depicting Machairodus with tiger-like markings.

Machairodus was first named in 1832, by German Naturalist Johann Jakob Kaup. Though its remains had been known since 1824, it was believed by Georges Cuvier that the fossils had come from a species of bear, which he called Ursus cultridens (known today as Megantereon) based on composite sample of teeth from different countries, species and geologic ages, leading to what would become a long series of complications. Kaup however, recognized the teeth as those of felids and promptly reclassified the existing specimens as Machairodus, including M. cultridens in it. The name quickly gained acceptance and by the end of the 19th century, many species of felid or related feliform (such as nimravids) were lumped into the genus Machairodus, including but not limited to Sansanosmilus, Megantereon, Paramachairodus, Amphimachairodus, Nimravides, and Homotherium among others. This would eventually turn Machairodus into something of a wastebasket taxon, which would be rectified with the discoveries of more complete skeletons of other machairodonts.

- Machairodus irtyschensis and Machairodus ischimicus were described in 1936.
- Machairodus robinsoni was described in 1976. It was at one point referred to the genus Miomachairodus.
- Machairodus laskarevi was described in 1978.
- Machairodus alberdiae was first described in 1981, and extensively compared and retained as valid in 2017.
- Machairodus kurteni was described in 1991. It was later referred to the genus Amphimachairodus.

Some of the most important fossils of Machairodus have come from the Cerro de los Batallones fossil site in Spain, which are filled caverns which predominantly carnivores became trapped within after entering probably looking for food or water, with the remains of the species Machairodus aphanistus representing roughtly 1/4 of all bones found at the Batallones-1 cavern at the site.

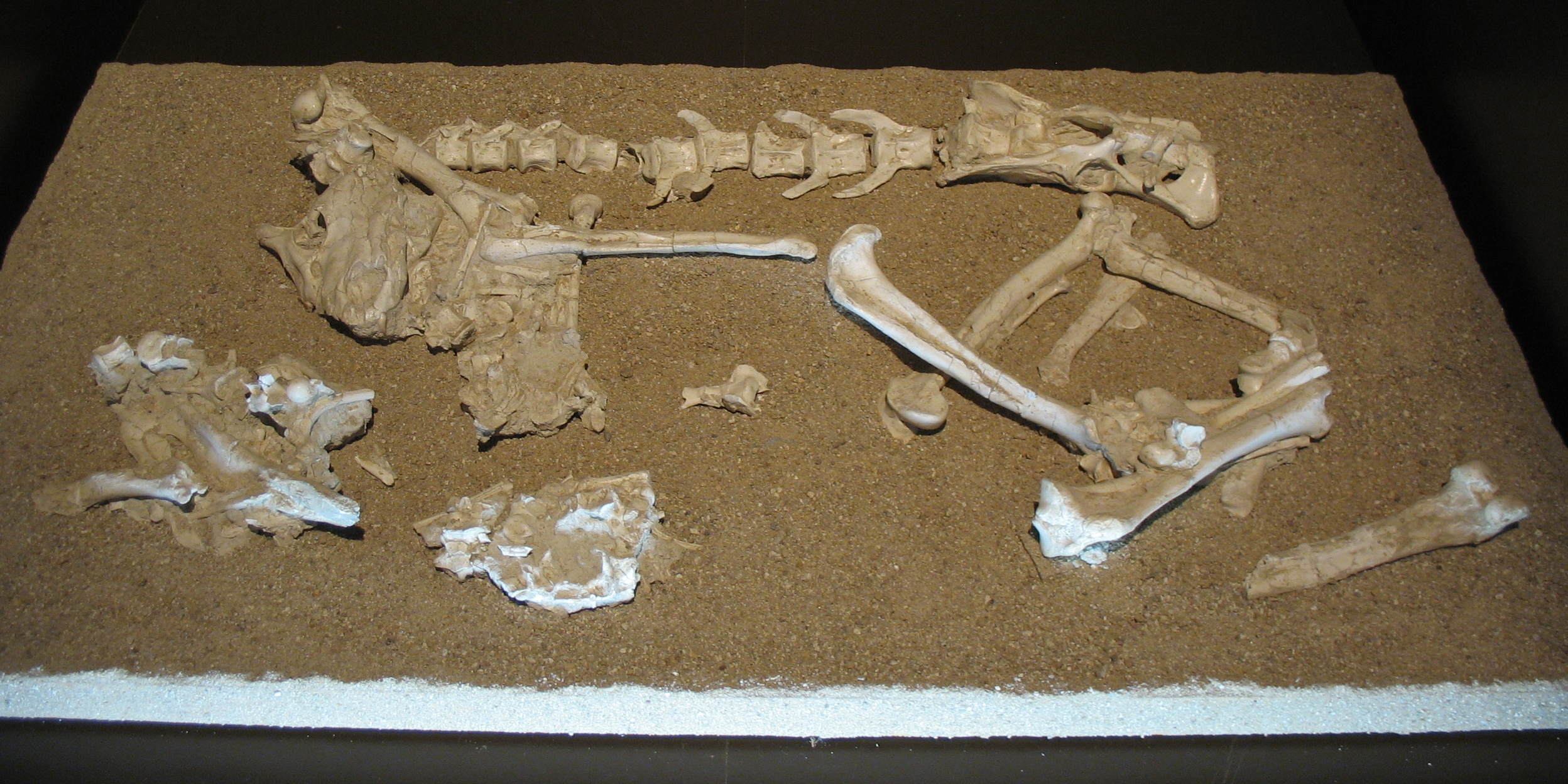
M. aphanistus skeleton from Cerro de los Batallones

The fossil species assigned to the genus Machairodus were divided by Turner into two grades of evolutionary development, with M. aphanistus and the North American "Nimravides" catacopis representing the more primitive grade and M. coloradensis and M. giganteus representing the more derived grade. The characteristics of the more advanced grade include a relative elongation of the forearm and a shortening of the lumbar region of the spine to resemble that in living pantherine cats. Subsequently, the more derived forms were assigned a new genus, Amphimachairodus, which includes M. coloradensis, M. kurteni, M. kabir and M. giganteus and recently M. horribilis. In addition, M. catacopsis and M. lahayishupup was reclassified as N. catacopsis.

Modern scholarship generally classifies Machairodus as one of the most basal members of the tribe Homotherini (with some authors retaining the name "Machairodontini" for the group). Machairodus is thought to be a paraphyletic evolutionary grade that is ancestral to Amphimachairodus (which is in turn ancestral to other homotheriines like Homotherium).

M. robinsoni is the earliest species within the genus, evolving during the late Middle Miocene, around 12.5 Ma in Tunisia, and is the only currently recognized species within the genus that inhabited Africa. The oldest occurrence of M. aphanistus within Vallès-Penedès Basin was 10.4 Ma. With the youngest occurrence within MN10 localities, 9.1 Ma. The chronostratigraphic range of M. aphanistus within the basin correlates with its chronological distribution across Europe. The genus was later replaced by A. giganteus during the early Turolian in Europe. However, M. aphanistus persisted longer in East Asia than in Europe, going extinct around 8.7 Ma, making it the youngest known occurrence of the genus.

== Description ==
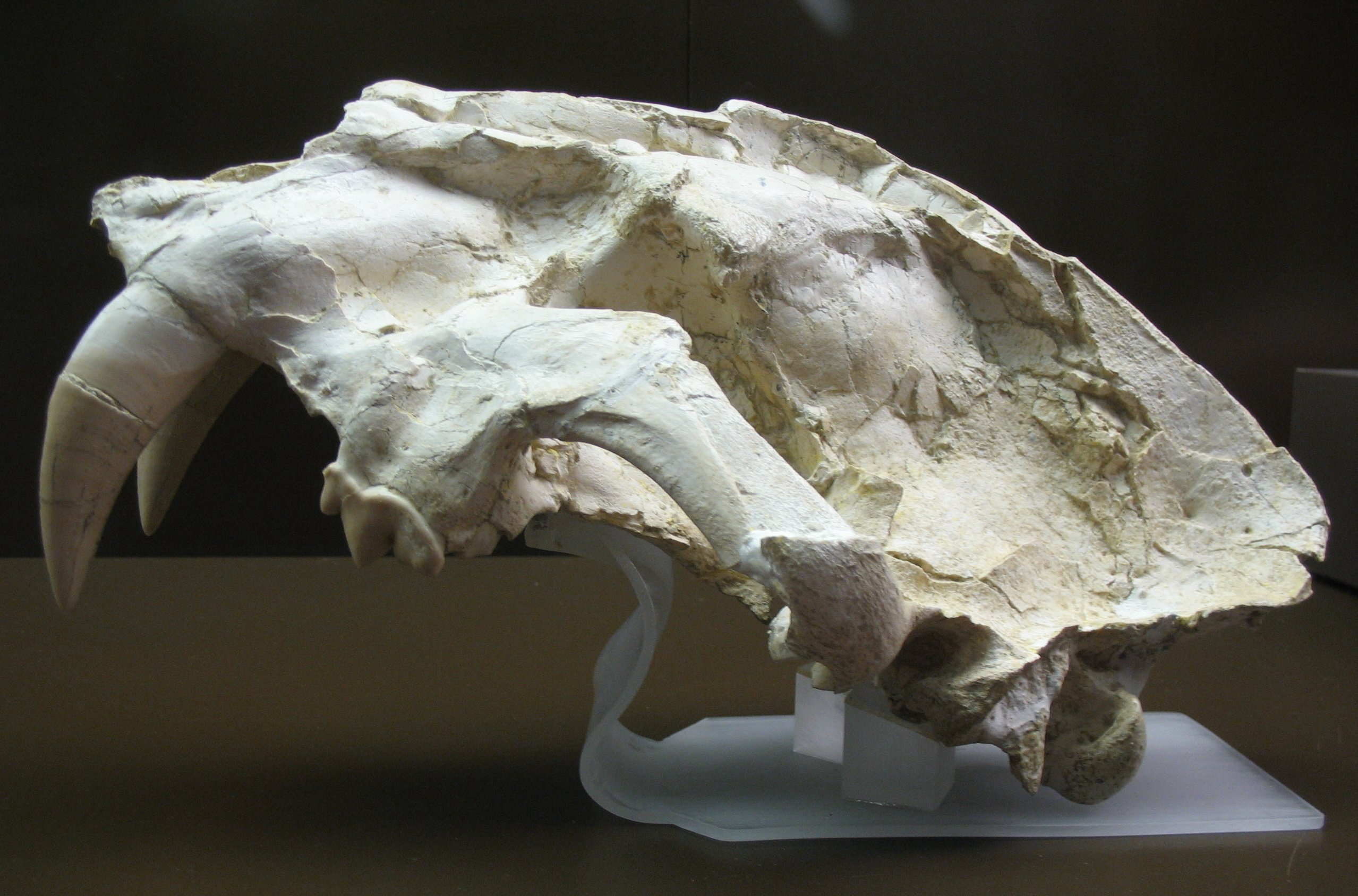
M. aphanistus skull

M. aphanistus from the Mediterranean late Miocene was comparable to a tiger in size and skeletal proportions, with a mass of 117–285 kg (258–628 pounds), with an average mass of 153 kg (337 pounds). It was similar to the related Nimravides of North America. The skeleton also indicates that this species would have possessed good jumping abilities.

M. alberdiae was contemporary with M. aphanistus in Cerro de los Batallones fossil deposits and was smaller and more primitive in anatomical features, and would not have exceeded 100 kg (220 pounds).

Overall, the skull of Machairodus was noticeably narrow compared with the skulls of extant pantherine cats, and the orbits were relatively small. The canines were long, thin and flattened from side to side but broad from front to back like the blade of a knife, as in Homotherium. The front and back edges of the canines were serrated when they first grew, but these serrations were worn down in the first few years of the animal's life.

== Paleobiology ==
=== Predatory behavior ===
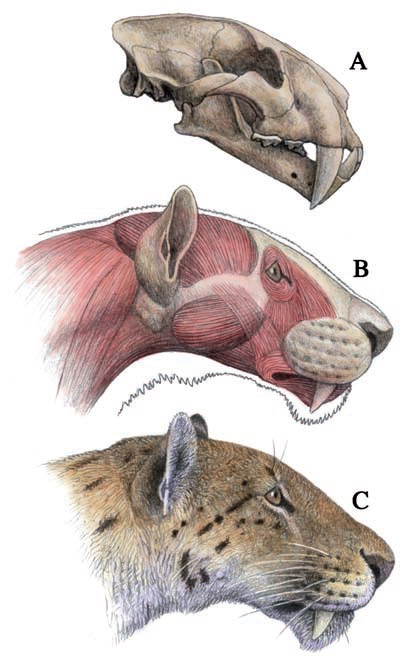
Reconstructionf of M. aphanistus by Mauricio Antón

Machairodus probably hunted as an ambush predator. Its legs were too short to sustain a long chase, so it most likely was a good jumper. Its teeth were rooted to its mouth and were as delicate as those in some related genera, unlike most saber-toothed cats and nimravids of the time, which often had extremely long canines which hung out of their mouths. The fangs of Machairodus, however, were able to more easily fit in its mouth comfortably while being long and effective for hunting. Studies of Machairodus indicate that the cat relied predominantly on its neck muscles to make the killing bite applied to its victims. The cervical vertebrae show clear adaptations to making vertical motions in the neck and skull. There are also clear adaptations for precise movements, strength, and flexibility in the neck that show compatibility with the canine-shearing bite technique that machairodontine cats are believed to have performed. These adaptations are believed to have also been partial compensation in this primitive machairodont against the high percentage of canine breakages seen in the genus.

It is estimated that a 136.8 kg (302 lb) M. aphanistus had a bite force of 1,077.4 N or 242.2 lbf at the canines.

=== Pathology ===
M. aphanistus fossils recovered from Batallones reveal a high percentage of tooth breakages, indicating that unlike later machairodonts, due to a lack of protruding incisors Machairodus often used its sabers to subdue prey in a manner similar to modern cats; this was a more risky strategy that virtually ensured that damage to their saber teeth often occurred. M. aphanistus fossils from Batallones displaying palaeopathologies also include a calcaneus displaying evidence of either a tumour or osteomyelitis, a third metacarpal displaying signs of osteosclerosis, and a mandible with an abscess in the mandibular body.

=== Social behavior ===
M. aphanistus shows a high degree of sexual dimorphism similar to lions and leopards, with males being larger than females, suggesting an increase in competition and low tolerance among males. Their high levels of sexual dimorphism would also suggest territories of males did not overlap with each other. The authors concluded that due to solitary behavior being common among modern felids, M. aphanistus would be assumed to be a solitary animal as well. However, a pathological analysis on M. aphanistus suggests that indication of survival of severe injuries, such as broken mandibles, could imply some social system. This was further supported based on modern day felids, as solitary felids with high levels of sexual dimorphism such as leopards typically die before severe injuries managed to heal, being unable to hunt for themselves or sustain themselves on carrion long-term. Lions, however, have a greater chance of survival, due to living in prides. Considering the high levels of sexual dimorphism in this species of Machairodus, this would likely indicate higher levels of intolerance to other individuals within their territory. It was summarized that unlike lions, they would not have formed prides as they lived in wooded environments, unlike the open landscapes inhabited by lions. Instead, males would have formed coalitions of two or more individuals that protected a large area, including territories of multiple females, who were more or less solitary animals.

== Paleoecology ==
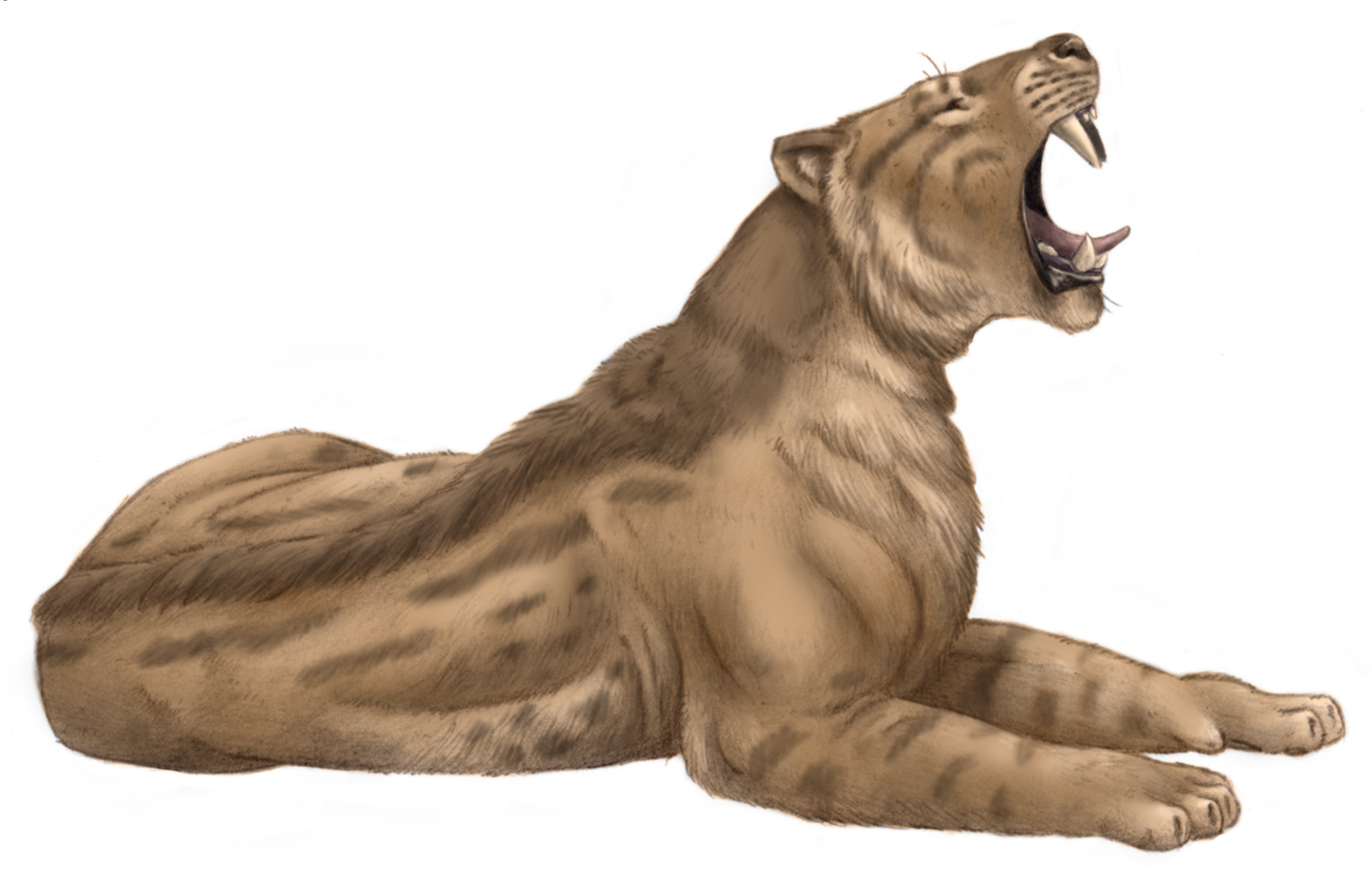
Life restoration

M. aphanistus seemed to prefer woodland habitat, as evidenced by finds at the Vallesian-aged Cerro de los Batallones. An analysis of its enamel δ^{13}C values has found that at Batallones, it, along with the smilodontin Promegantereon ogygia with which it coexisted, preferred denser woodland environments compared to the contemporary amphicyonid Magericyon anceps that foraged in more open habitats. As a top predator at Batallones, it would have hunted large herbivores of the time. Isotopic analysis supports bovids being the top prey at the Batallones 1 sublocality, while at the later Batallones 3, the three-toed equine Hipparion is thought to have been a major component of its diet.

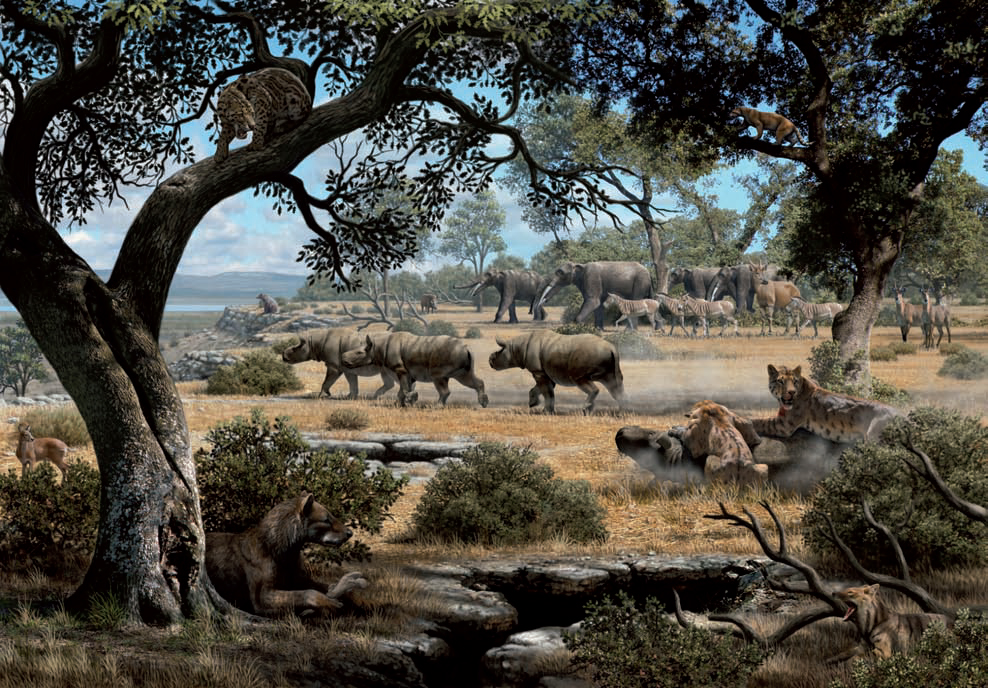
Vallesian environment and fauna of Cerro de los Batallones including M. aphanistus (right), by Mauricio Antón

Other animals that were contemporaneous with Machairodus at Batallones include the hornless rhinoceros Aceratherium, the giraffes Decennatherium and Birgerbohlinia, the deer Euprox and Lucentia, the antelopes Paleoreas, Tragoportax, Miotragocerus and Dorcatherium, the "gomphotherid" elephantoid Tetralophodon, the porcupine Hystrix, and the suid Microstonyx. Machairodus would have competed for such prey with the amphicyonid Magericyon, fellow machairodonts Promegantereon and Paramachairodus, bears such as Agriotherium and Indarctos, and the small hyaenid Protictitherium. While Agriotherium and Magericyon would likely have been strongly competitive with Machairodus for food, Promegantereon, Paramachairodus and Protictitherium likely were less potential rivals. Evidence also exists indicating that Machairodus may have been prone to niche partitioning with Magericyon, possibly living in slightly different habitats, with the machairodont preferring more heavily vegetated habitats while the bear-dog hunted in the more open areas. Dietary preferences may also have played a role in the coexistence between these two large predators at Batallones.

In Los Valles de Fuentidueña, M. aphanistus coexisted with carnivorans including barbourofelin nimravid Albanosmilus jourdani, basal felid Pseudaelurus quadridentatus, amphicyoninae Magericyon castellanus, and ictitheriinae hyena Lycyaena chaeretis. Herbivores within this locality include hipparionini equid Hippotherium primigenium, aceratheriinae rhinos Aceratherium incisivum and Alicornops simorrense, bovid Miotragocerus, cervid Euprox dicranocerus, tragulid Dorcatherium naui, giraffid Decennatherium pachecoi, and "tetralophodont gomphothere" Tetralophodon longirostris. Isotopic analysis shows Machairodus hunted in woodland to mesic grasslands and preyed upon Hippotherium, Miotragocerus, Euprox, Dorcatherium, and Chalicomys. Hippotherium was found to make the greatest contribution to its diet while Dorcatherium was the least contributor. The isotopic values also showed that there was a significant niche overlap between large predators within LVF, which strongly suggests resource competition, this is further supported by the density of large predators and low density of small and medium herbivores.

This species was also found in Linxia Basin, which suggests they were present in East Asia during the Late Miocene. They would have coexisted with a number of other large carnivores including two unnamed species of agriotherine bears, the nimravid Albanosmilus, fellow machairodont Amphimachairodus, and the hyena Dinocrocuta. Given their different skull morphology, they would've practiced niche partitioning, with Machairodus being more adapted for forested areas compared to Amphimachairodous, which was more adapted for open environments.
