= Cerro de los Batallones =

Spanish fossil site

Coordinates: 40°10′20″N 3°42′51″W

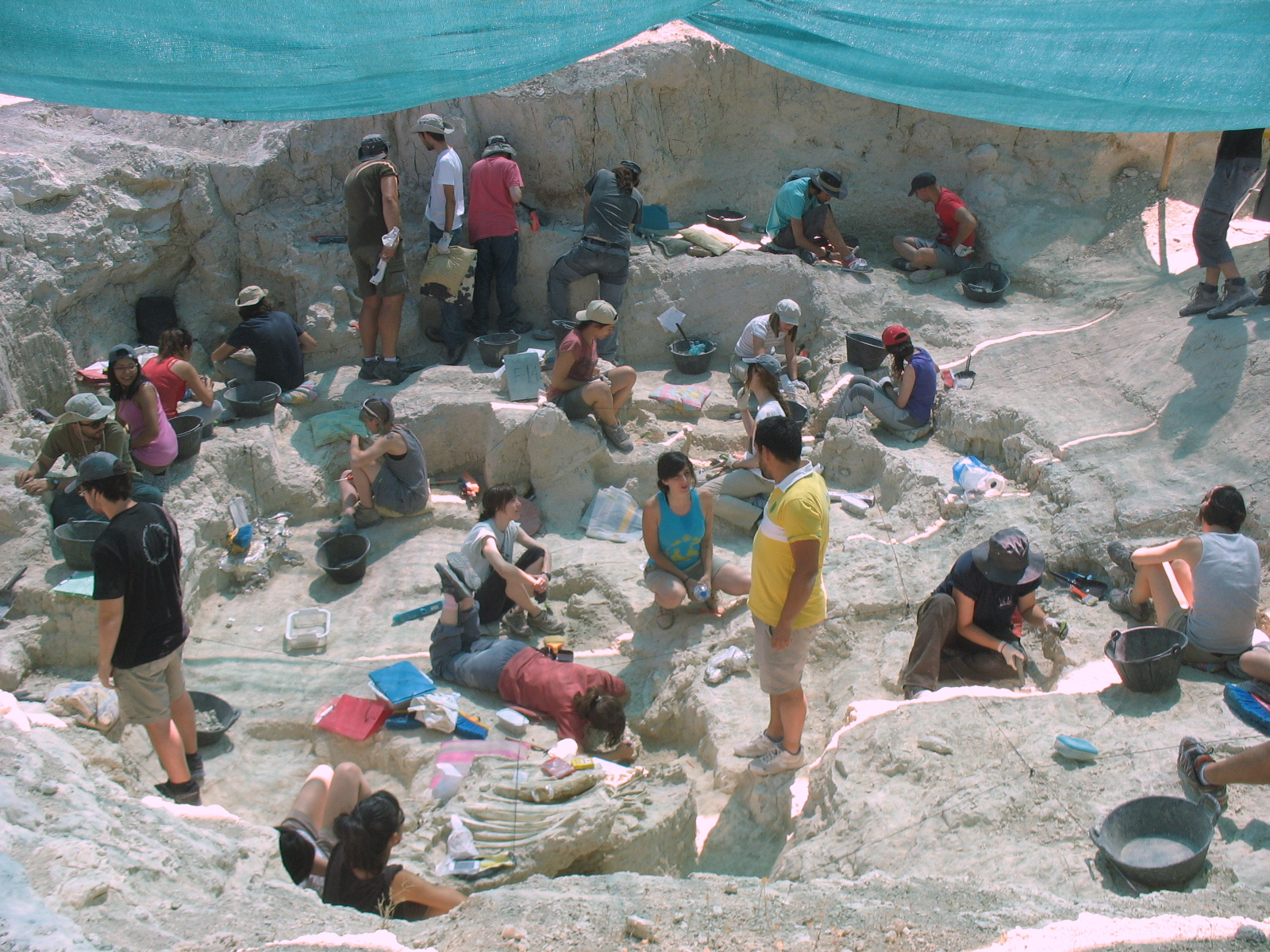
2015 field works at Batallones 10 fossil site.

A baculum of Indarctos arctoides found at Batallones-3.

Cerro de los Batallones (Hill of the Battalions) is a hill at Torrejón de Velasco, Madrid, Spain where a number of fossil sites from the Upper Miocene (MN10) have been found. Nine sites have been discovered with predominantly vertebrate fossils, invertebrates and plants being less represented. The first deposits were discovered accidentally in July 1991.

Quantitative biochronological analyses of the Batallones-1 (B-1) fauna using probabilistic techniques yields ages between 9.8 Ma and 9.1 Ma. Although of similar age, Batallones-10 (B-10) is considered to contain the oldest representative of fossils.

== Fossils ==
Nearly the entire proportion of fossils of Batallones-1 were of Carnivorans. The species of sabre-tooth cat known as Promegantereon ogygia and Machairodus aphanistus (the first complete skull) were found at B-1, as was Simocyon a type of red panda. In regards to the saber-tooth cats, Batallones-1 represents an ideal site for recording the percentage of specimens for which breakage of the upper canines occurred. Promegantereon, Machairodus and Paramachaerodus are perfect examples of this at Batallones; fossils indicate a high number of canine breaks from where the teeth hit the bones of a struggling victim, indicating these early machairodonts would use their elongated teeth to subdue prey as modern big cats do.

A new species of Hispanomys (Rodentia) was found at various sites. A new species of Micromeryx (deer) was found at B-1 and B-10.

== Fauna ==
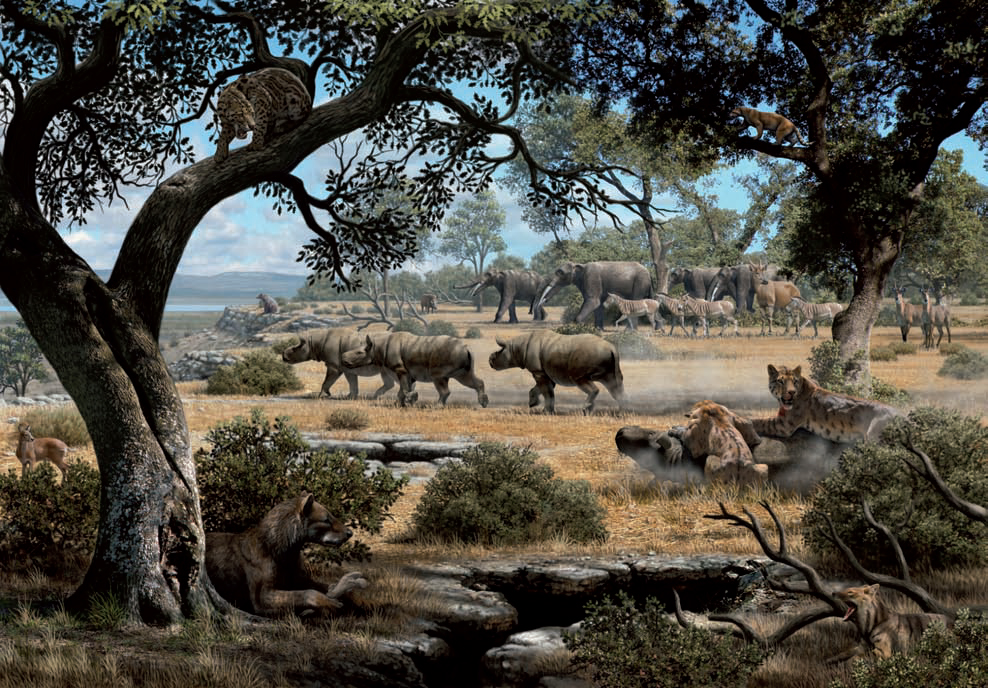
Vallesian environment and fauna of Cerro de los Batallones by Mauricio Antón

Below is a list of notable fossil genera from Cerro de los Batallones.

=== Artiodactyla ===
- †Boselaphine antelopes
- †Decennatherium rex
- †Micromeryx flourensianus
- †Microstonyx major

=== Carnivora ===
- †Ammitocyon kainos
- †Amphicyon major
- †Eomellivora piveteaui
- †Indarctos arctoides
- †Leptofelis vallesiensis
- †Machairodus aphanistus & M. alberdiae
- †Magericyon anceps & M. castellanus
- †Promegantereon ogygia
- †Protictitherium crassum
- †Simocyon batalleri

=== Perissodactyla ===
- †Aceratherium incisivum
- †Hippotherium primigenium
- †Hispanotherium matritense

=== Proboscidea ===
- †Tetralophodon longirostris

=== Rodentia ===
- †Hispanomys

== See also ==
- List of fossil sites
