= Paramachaerodus =

Paramachaerodus Temporal range: Middle to Late Miocene

Scientific classification
- Kingdom: Animalia
- Phylum: Chordata
- Class: Mammalia
- Order: Carnivora
- Family: Felidae
- Subfamily: †Machairodontinae
- Tribe: †Smilodontini
- Genus: †Paramachaerodus; Pilgrim, 1913

Type species
- Paramachaerodus orientalis (Kittl, 1887) sensu Pilgrim, 1913

Other species
- Paramachaerodus maximiliani (Zdansky, 1924) sensu Pilgrim, 1931; Paramachaerodus transasiaticus; Paramachaerodus yingliangi

Synonyms
- Paramachaerodus: Paramachairodus; Pontosmilus Kretzoi, 1929; Protamphimachairodus Kretzoi, 1929; Propontosmilus Kadic and Kretzoi, 1930; synonyms of P. orientalis: Machaerodus orientalis Kittl, 1887; Machairodus schlosseri Weithofer, 1888; Felis orientalis (Kittl, 1887) sensu Boule, 1901; Felis schlosseri (Weithofer, 1888) sensu Boule, 1901; Machairodus hungaricus Kormos, 1911; Pontosmilus indicus Kretzoi, 1929; Pseudaelurus sivalensis Lydekker, 1877; Aelurogale sivalensis (Lydekker, 1877) sensu Lydekker, 1884; Aelurictis sivalensis (Lydekker, 1877) sensu Pilgrim, 1910; Sivaelurus sivalensis (Lydekker, 1877) sensu Pilgrim, 1913; Paramachaerodus sivalensis (Lydekker, 1877) sensu Pilgrim, 1915; Machaerodus sivalensis (Lydekker, 1877) sensu Matthew, 1929; Propontosmilus sivalensis (Lydekker, 1877) sensu Kretzoi, 1929; Propontosmilus matthewi Kadic & Kretzoi, 1930; Paramachaerodus indicus (Kretzoi, 1929) sensu Pilgrim, 1932; Paramachaerodus schlosseri (Weithofer, 1888) sensu Kretzoi, 1938; Paramachaerodus hungaricus (Kormos, 1911) sensu Kretzoi, 1938; Propontosmilus matthewi (Kadic & Kretzoi, 1930) sensu Kretzoi, 1938; Pontosmilus orientalis (Kittl, 1887) sensu Kretzoi, 1938; Paramachaerodus matthewi (Kadic & Kretzoi, 1930) sensu Kretzoi, 1951; Megantereon orientalis (Kittl, 1887) sensu Kurten, 1976; Pontosmilus hungaricus; Pontosmilus schlosseri; synonyms of P. maximiliani: Machaerodus maximiliani Zdansky, 1924; Protamphimachairodus maximiliani (Zdansky, 1924) sensu Kretzoi, 1929; Protamphimachairodus indicus Simpson, 1945

Extinct genus of carnivores

Paramachaerodus is an extinct genus of saber-tooth cat of the subfamily Machairodontinae, which was endemic to Eurasia during the Middle and Late Miocene from 15 to 9 Ma. A 2022 phylogenetic analysis suggested that the genus may be polyphyletic.

Paramacherodus is one of the earliest known true saber-toothed cats. Many fossils were discovered in Cerro de los Batallones, a Late Miocene fossil site near Madrid, Spain. One leopard-sized species is known, Paramachaerodus orientalis from the Turolian. A second species, Paramacharodus maximiliani, has been considered a synonym of Paramachaerodus orientalis by some authors, but was considered a valid species in the most recent systematic revision. That revision, based on an extensive morphological analysis, also determined that the species P. ogygia exhibited less derived sabertooth features than the other Paramachaerodus species and should be assigned to a separate genus, Promegantereon.

== Description ==
The animals were about 58 centimetres (23 in) high at the shoulder, similar to a leopard, but with a more supple body. The shape of its limbs suggests that it may have been an agile climber, and could have hunted relatively large prey.

== History and naming ==
In 1913, Guy Ellcock Pilgrim named the new genus Paramachaerodus for the species Machaerodus orientalis, Machaerodus schlosseri, and Felis ogygia; at the time, however, he failed to designate a type species. In 1915 he described more material that he assigned to Paramachaerodus cf. schlosseri (two hemimandibles, GSI-140 and GSI-141), though Matthew (1929) noted that both of those specimens did not closely resemble others in the genus. He rectified the lack of a type species in 1931 by designating Paramachaerodus orientalis the type species, now including Paramachaerodus schlosseri as a junior synonym.

However, in the intervening span of time, Miklos Kretzoi had proposed another new genus, Pontosmilus, for the species P. orientalis (also the type species), P. schlosseri, P. ogygia, P. hungaricus, and the new species Pontosmilus indicus that he described based on GSI-141. He restricted Paramachaerodus to another new species, P. pilgrimi, that he described based on GSI-140. He also proposed the genus Proamphimachairodus for the species Machairodus maximiliani.

With Pilgrim's clarification of Paramachaerodus in 1931, and utter rejection of both Pontosmilus and Proamphimachairodus-he included Machairodus orientalis, Felis ogygia, and Machairodus maximiliani as species of Paramachaerodus-Pontosmilus was rendered an invalid genus, for it possessed no valid type species, and both Pontosmilus and Proamphimachairodus were designated junior synonyms of Paramachaerodus.

A major review of the genus in 2010 designated P. matthewi, P. schlosseri, P. hungaricus as junior synonyms of P. orientalis, with P. maximiliani the only other valid species in Paramachaerodus, and assigning P. agygia back to Promegantereon. It also noted that "Pontosmilus" indicus (GSI-141) was a feline, and "Pontosmilus" pilgrimi (GSI-140) a machairodontine not of Paramachaerodus or Promegantereon, though the authors offered no alternate genus assignments for either species.

A third species, Paramachaerodus transasiaticus, was described in 2017 based on analysis of new fossil material from the late Miocene localities of Hezheng, Gansu Province, China, and Hadjidimovo, Bulgaria. These specimens had sabertooth characteristics intermediate between those of P. ogygia and those of P. orientalis and P. maximiliani.

In 2022, a new species Paramachaerodus yingliangi was proposed based on fossils from northeastern China; the same paper also proposed separating Paramachaerodus schlosseri as the new type species and moving P. orientalis and P. maximiliani to the resurrected genus Pontosmilus.

== Classification ==
The position of Paramachaerodus within the Machairodontinae has been subject to much controversy, partially because many names have historically been proposed for it based on only scanty material. While Paramachaerodus is generally accepted as a close relative and probable forerunner of Megantereon and therefore an ancestor of Smilodon, the role Promegantereon played in this is still controversial. While researchers have generally favoured the classification of Promegantereon as a distinct genus starting in the early 2000's, it was still thought to be a close relative and potential ancestor of Paramachaerodus. Thus, Paramachaerodus' position within the Smilodontini was generally understood as intermediate, with Promegantereon as the first and Smilodon as the ultimate representative of that machairodontine tribe.

However, a 2022 phylogenetic analysis by Jiangzuo et al. cast doubt on this, and indeed on the monophyly of Paramachaerodus itself. While it confirmed P. orientalis as basal to the Megantereon-Smilodon clade (the Smilodontini sensu stricto) as proposed earlier, P. maxilmiliani was instead found to be basal to a clade comprising Rhizosmilodon and Dinofelis. At the same time, Promegantereon and Paramachaerodus transasiaticus were found to group together with Metailurus and Yoshi, which are usually placed in the separate Metailurini tribe. This would make Paramachaerodus, the Smilodontini and the Metailurini as traditionally definded polyphyletic, and calls for more work regarding machairodontine systematics, suggesting that a major revision of the subfamily may be needed.

== Paleobiology ==
Based on the morphology of its humerus, P. orientalis is inferred to have been adapted for wooded environments.
