= Tungurictis =

Tungurictis Temporal range: 17–12 Ma Early Miocene – Middle Miocene

Scientific classification
- Domain: Eukaryota
- Kingdom: Animalia
- Phylum: Chordata
- Class: Mammalia
- Order: Carnivora
- Suborder: Feliformia
- Family: Hyaenidae
- Genus: †Tungurictis; Colbert, 1939

Type species
- †Tungurictis spocki Colbert, 1939

Other species
- †T. peignei Wang et al., 2020

Synonyms
- Protictitherium intermedium (Schmidt-Kittler, 1976) Wang et al., 1998

Extinct genus of carnivores

Tungurictis is an extinct genus of hyaenids containing two described species that lived in East Asia during the Early and Middle Miocene, 17–12 million years ago. The oldest known species, Tungurictis peignei, lived from 17–14 Ma, and was ancestral to the type species, Tungurictis spocki. T. spocki originated in the Middle Miocene and lived until 12 Ma in China. Specimens of both species have been discovered in China, with the type species being known from the Tunggur Formation of Inner Mongolia, and T. peignei from the Junggar Basin in the Xinjiang Upper Autonomous Region. Tungurictis is one of the earliest genera of Hyaenidae, alongside other Early Miocene hyaenids Plioviverrops and Protictitherium.

== Taxonomy ==
In 1939 Colbert erected Tungurictis and named its type species T. spocki. The holotype (AMNH 26600), from the Tunggur Formation of Inner Mongolia in China, is a nearly complete skull. A paratype mandibular fragment containing premolars (AMNH 26610) was also used to describe this taxon. Colbert believed that Tunguricts belonged to the Viverridae, but it was referred to the Hyaenidae by Qiu et al. in 1988. In 1989 Hunt also argued that Tungurictis was a hyaenid. Werdelin and Solounias included Tungurictis in their 1991 review of the Hyaenidae.

Tungurictis punica from the Beglia Formation of Bled Douarah, Tunisia, was described by Kurtén in 1976. This species was reassigned to Protictitherium by Werdelin and Solounias (1991) as P. punicum.

T. peignei from the Suosuoquan Formation of the Junggar Basin in the Xinjiang Upper Autonomous Region, China, was named by Wang et al. in 2020. Material previously attributed to Protictitherium intermedium was used to describe this species. T. peignei was described as the smallest and most primitive Tungurictis.
