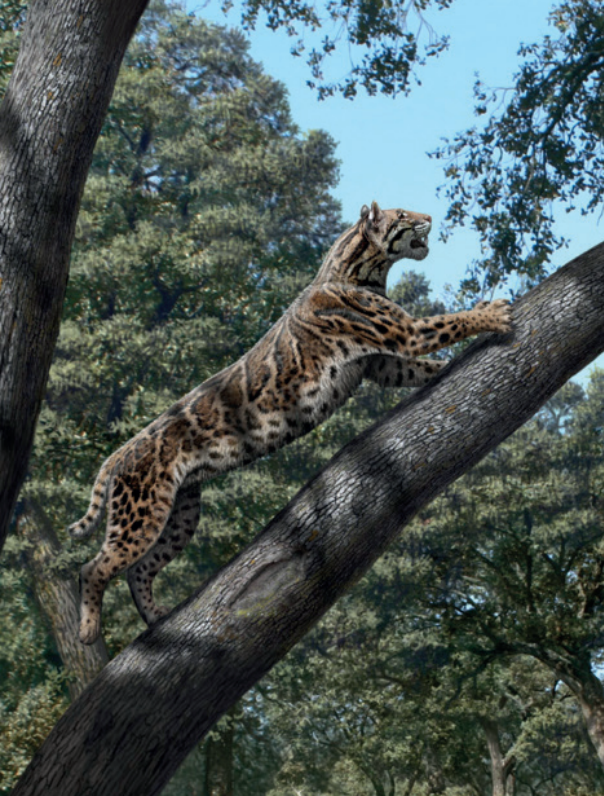
- Restoration by Mauricio Antón

Scientific classification
- Kingdom: Animalia
- Phylum: Chordata
- Class: Mammalia
- Order: Carnivora
- Family: Felidae
- Subfamily: †Machairodontinae
- Tribe: †Smilodontini
- Genus: †Promegantereon; Kretzoi, 1938

Type species
- Promegantereon ogygia (Kaup, 1832)

Synonyms
- Felis ogygia Kaup, 1832; Felis antediluviana Kaup, 1832; Felis Ogygea (Kaup, 1832) sensu Blainville, 1842; Felis pardus eppelsheimensis Koppen, 1869; Machaerodus ogygius (Kaup, 1832) sensu Cope, 1879; Machaerodus ogygia (Kaup, 1832) sensu Weithofer, 1888; Pontosmilus ogygius (Kaup, 1832) sensu Kretzoi, 1929; Paramachaerodus ogygia (Kaup, 1832) sensu Pilgrim, 1931; Paramachairodus ogygius (Kaup, 1832) sensu Haupt, 1935; Neofelis (?) antediluviana (Kaup, 1832) sensu Haupt, 1935

= Promegantereon =

Promegantereon Temporal range: Middle Miocene–Late Miocene

Extinct genus of carnivores

Promegantereon is an extinct genus of machairodont from the Miocene of Europe. It is one of the oldest machairodont cats, and thought to have been a Smilodontini and an ancestor of Megantereon and Smilodon. Although, recent analyses suggests it may have been a Metailurini.

== History and taxonomy ==
The species of Felis ogygia was first described by Kaup in 1832. In 1938, Kretzoi proposed moving it to the new genus Promegantereon. It was also thought to have been a species of Paramachairodus, however further analysis found that due to its more primitive morphology as evidenced by Salesa et al. in 2002 with an in-depth description of its anatomy, Promegantereon ogygia is believed to be its own genus and species and therefore should be separate from Paramachairodus.

== Description ==
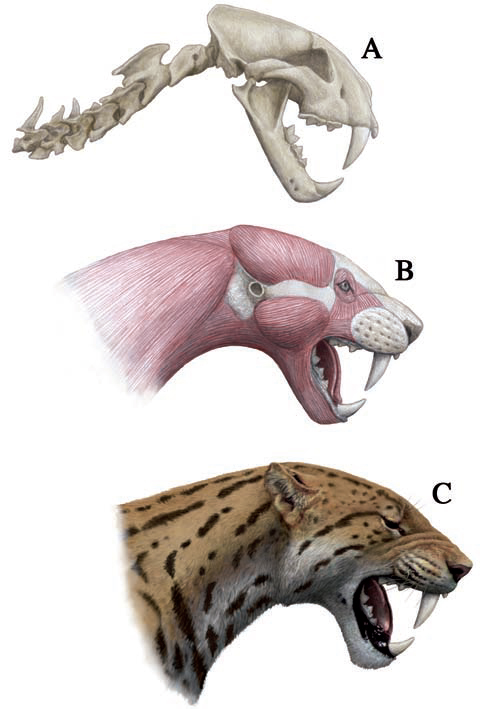
Reconstructions by Antón

Promegantereon is one of the oldest known true saber-toothed cats. Its fossils were discovered in Cerro de los Batallones, a Late Miocene fossil site near Madrid, Spain. However, it was only known from skull fragments from Eppelsheim until the early 1990s when the Cerro de los Battlones fossil beds were discovered. The animal was about 58 centimetres (23 in) high at the shoulder, similar to a leopard in size, but with a more supple body. The shape of its limbs suggests that it may have been an agile, scansorial climber, and could have hunted relatively large prey thanks to its elongate, flattened upper canines. The species was sexually dimorphic with males being larger than females. Salesa et al. (2002) estimated that P. ogygia could have weighed 28–65 kg (62–143 pounds), making it around the size of an extant puma. Domingo et al. (2013) suggested the largest P. ogygia may have weighed 97 kg (214 pounds), with an average body mass of 41 kg (90 pounds).

== Palaeobiology ==
=== Predatory behavior ===
The specimens of Promegantereon at Batallones indicate that high percentages of canine breaks were present in this species. This indicates that they hunted in a similar manner to modern cats, a method of hunting that was much riskier due to the lack of protruding incisors. The presence of robust forelimbs in Promegantereon suggests it subdued prey quickly.

=== Social behavior ===
P. ogygia was thought to have been a solitary predator due to the lack of juveniles found in Cerro de los Batallones. It was suggested that low levels of sexual dimorphism, which is indicative of minimal intraspecific competition between males. This would also suggest that adults of the species had a high degree of tolerance for one another and that young adults of the species would have been able to inhabit their mothers' territory after maturing.

== Paleoecology ==
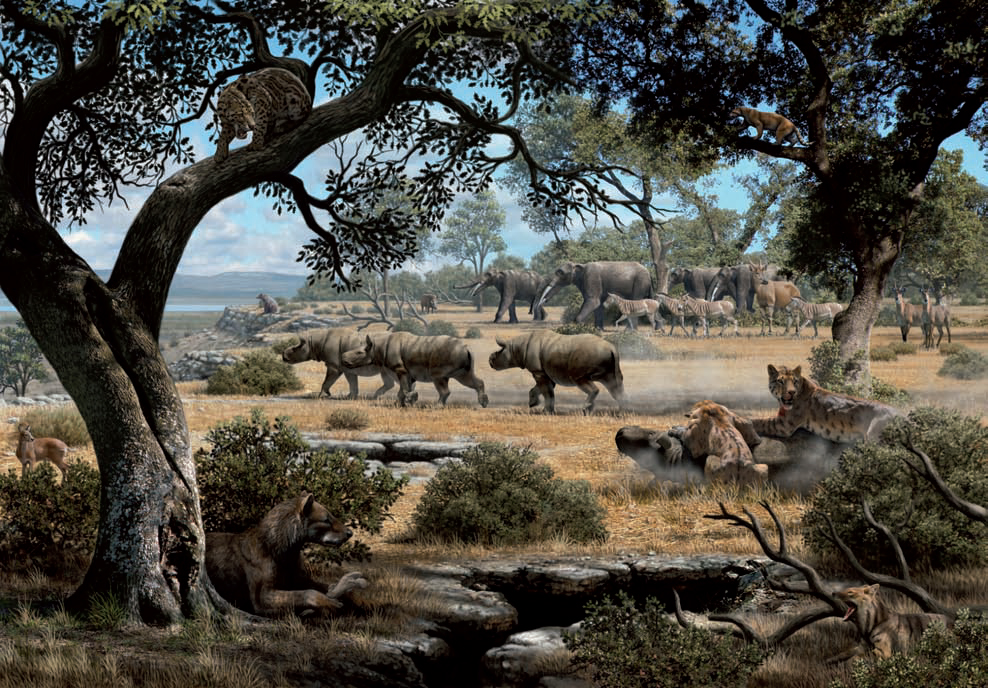
Vallesian environment and fauna of Cerro de los Batallones including Promegantereon (on the tree), by Mauricio Antón

Promegantereon seemed to prefer open woodland habitat, as evidenced by finds at Cerro de los Batallones, which is a fossil deposit of Vallesian age. Promegantereon was the most common carnivoran of found in BAT-1 making up 16% of all carnivoran taxa. As a predator at Batallones, it would have hunted many of the relatively large herbivores of the time as well as the young of much larger animals. Such herbivores that it could hunt would have included horses like Hipparion, young of the hornless rhinoceros Aceratherium and the proboscidean Tetralophodon, the suid Microstonyx, and possibly the calves of silvatherid giraffes and boselaphine antelopes. Isotopic analysis found Promegantereon hunted in woodland habitats. Within BAT-1, Promegantereon primarily hunted Bovidae indet. while in BAT-3, Promegantereon preferred Hipparion. Isotopic analysis also found δ^{13}C values of Promegantereon overlapped with the mean of Microstonyx, however due to the large size of the adults, it may have been one of the less feasible prey for Promegantereon.

=== Competitors ===
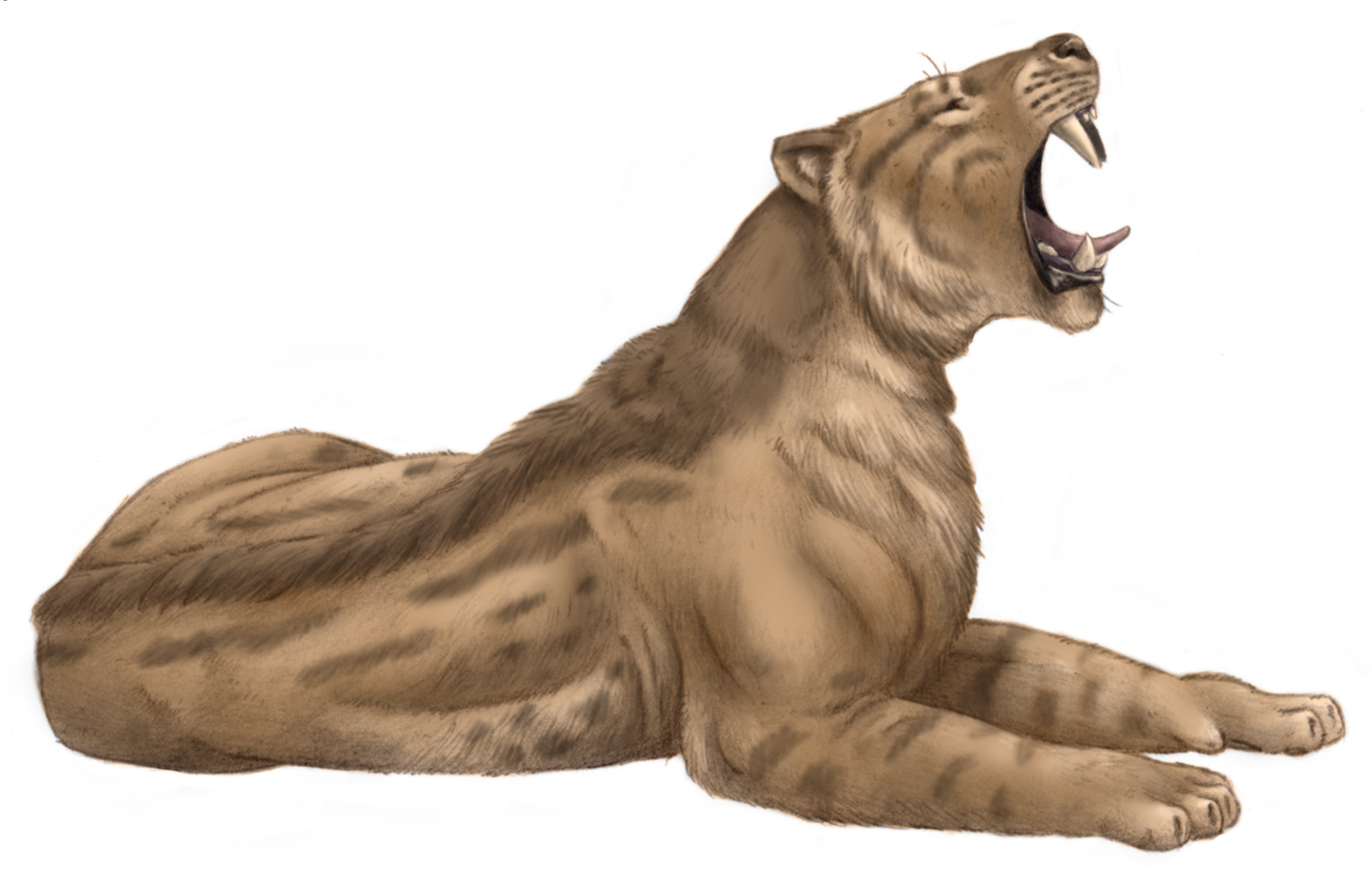
Life reconstruction of Machairodus aphanistus, who probably competed with Promegantereon. Both predators likely coexisted by preferring different prey and habitats.

Promegantereon would have competed with predators such as the amphicyonid Magericyon, fellow machairodonts Machairodus and Paramachairodus, the bear Indarctos, and the small hyenid Protictitherium. Isotopic analysis found Promegantereon niche partitoned with Magericyon by preferring wooded habitats, with Magericyon hunting prey such as the antelope Austroportax in more open environments. On the other hand, Ammitocyon, Machairodus, Promegantereon, and Indarctos hunted Hipparion hunted in more closed habitats. Promegantereon and Machairodus would have hunted prey of different sizes, with the former using tree cover as a refuge to avoid encounters with Machairodus. If it were to encounter larger predators such as Indarctos, Machairodus and Magericyon, the larger carnivorans likely have driven it from its kills when they sensed an opportunity. Eomellivora was likely to have been a more direct competitor towards Promegantereon in terms of prey body mass, although the slight difference in δ^{18}O suggests Promegantereon may have preferred more wooded habitats and the mustelid may have obtained food items by scavenging. Potential competitors such as Paramachairodus and Protictitherium were likely less dangerous rivals that could be driven away or fought off.
