= Pliotragus =

Pliotragus Temporal range: Pliocene–Early Pleistocene

Scientific classification
- Kingdom: Animalia
- Phylum: Chordata
- Class: Mammalia
- Infraclass: Placentalia
- Order: Artiodactyla
- Family: Bovidae
- Subfamily: Caprinae
- Genus: †Pliotragus
- Species: †P. ardeus

Binomial name
- †Pliotragus ardeus Deperet, 1883

Extinct genus of bovid

Pliotragus is an extinct genus of caprine bovid that lived in Eurasia during the Pliocene and Pleistocene epochs.

== Palaeobiology ==
=== Palaeoecology ===
According to dental mesowear scoring, Pliotragus ardeus was a browser or browse-dominated mixed feeder; in Europe, they were likely mixed feeders while specimens from China show scores closer to browsing herbivores.
