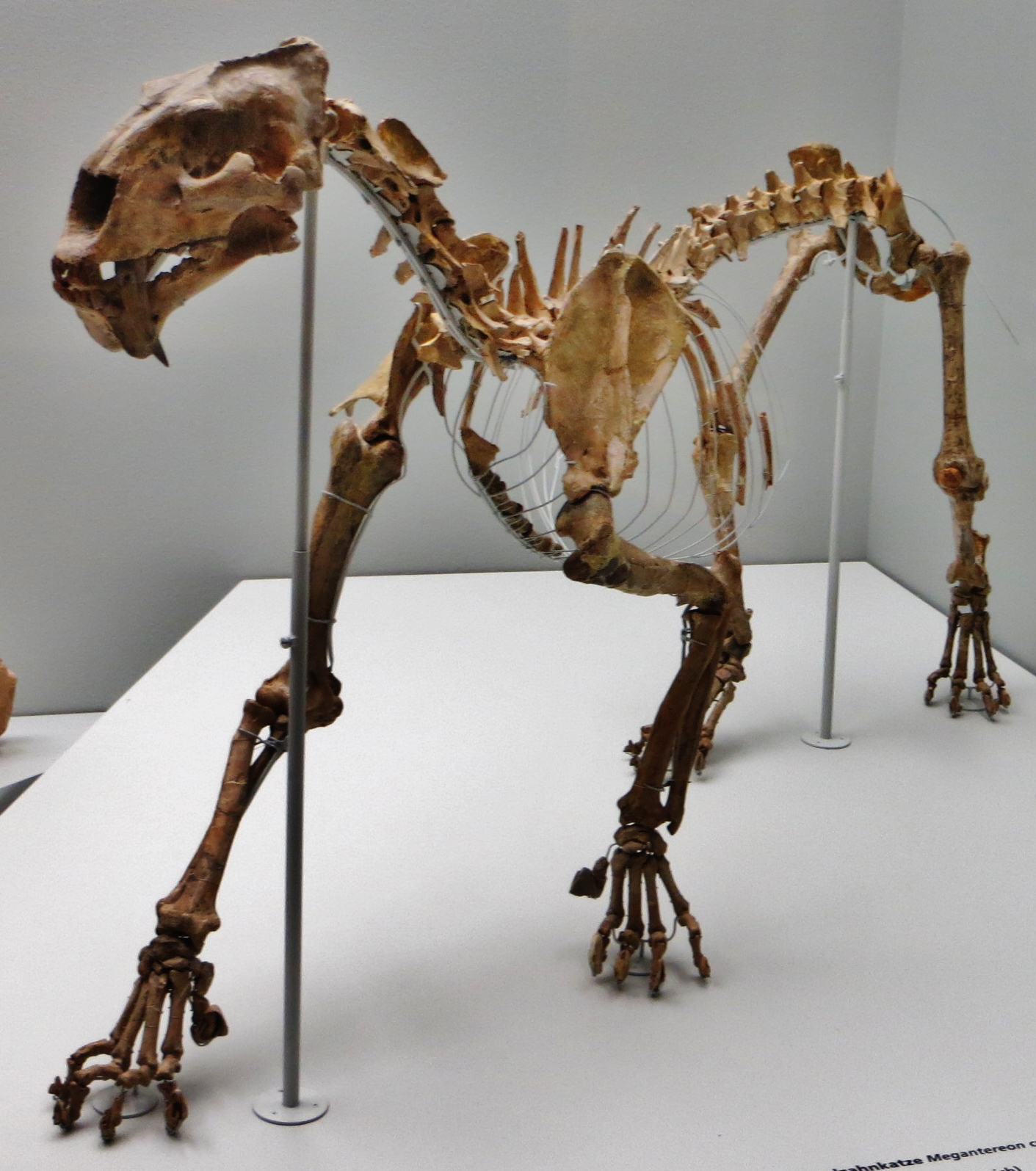
- M. cultridens skeleton on display at the Natural History Museum of Basel, Switzerland

Scientific classification
- Kingdom: Animalia
- Phylum: Chordata
- Class: Mammalia
- Order: Carnivora
- Family: Felidae
- Subfamily: †Machairodontinae
- Tribe: †Smilodontini
- Genus: †Megantereon; Croizet & Jobert, 1828

Type species
- Megantereon cultridens (Cuvier, 1824)

Other species
- See text
- Location of all Megantereon localities around the world.

= Megantereon =

Megantereon Temporal range: Late Pliocene (Piacenzian) to Middle Pleistocene, 3.6–0.40 Ma Possible Late Miocene and Early Pliocene records

Extinct genus of saber-toothed cat from North America, Eurasia and Africa

Megantereon is an extinct genus of prehistoric machairodontine saber-toothed cat that lived in Eurasia, Africa and possibly North America from the late Pliocene to the Middle Pleistocene, first described by George Cuvier in 1824. It is a member of the tribe Smilodontini, and closely related to and possibly the ancestor of the more widely-known American sabertooth Smilodon, with which it shared greatly elongated saber canine teeth. In comparison to Smilodon, Megantereon was somewhat smaller, around the size of a jaguar, although it is thought to have had a similar hunting strategy as an ambush predator. Megantereon began to decline towards the end of the Early Pleistocene, becoming extinct in Africa first around 1.3 Ma and later in Europe around 1 Ma, surviving latest in East Asia into the Middle Pleistocene until sometime around 780-350,000 years ago. Environmental change, changes in prey availability, and competition from early humans have been suggested as reasons for its extinction.

== Taxonomy and evolution ==
The type species of Megantereon, M. cultridens was described by Georges Cuvier in 1824, as Ursus cultridens, based on two teeth collected from Pliocene sediments in the Valdarno region of Tuscany, Italy, erroneously considering them to belong to a bear. In addition to the two teeth of Megantereon, Cuvier included another, much older tooth from the late Miocene of Eppelsheim in Germany in the species, which is now known to belong to the unrelated sabertooth cat Machairodus aphanistus, This decision would result in much later taxonomic confusion. In 1824, a fossil mandible of Megantereon from the Les Etouaires site in France was described by Croizet and Jobert as the new felid species Felis megantereon. As scientists were unfamiliar with the concept of sabertooths at the time, they did not realise that a large upper canine from the site belonged to the same species, instead attributing it to Cuvier's Ursus cultridens. In 1828, French paleontologist M. Bravard described a skull with preserved sabers from the Mont Perrier site in France as the species Megantereon megantereon, He suggested that Ursus cultridens should be renamed Machairodus cultridens and should be restricted to cats with serrated saberteeth (as is the case with the Eppelseim tooth, but not the unserrated teeth from Valdarno). However, in an 1890 review of sabertooth cat remains from Tuscany, Fabrini used the species name Machairodus (Meganthereon) cultridens to refer to cats which had unserrated canine saber teeth like those from Valdarno. There was much taxonomic confusion regarding the issue until 1979 when another review of sabertooth cats from Tuscany was carried out by G. Ficcarelli, who found that Megantereon crenatidens was the valid species according to nomenclatural rules for those sabertooths with unserrated sabers.

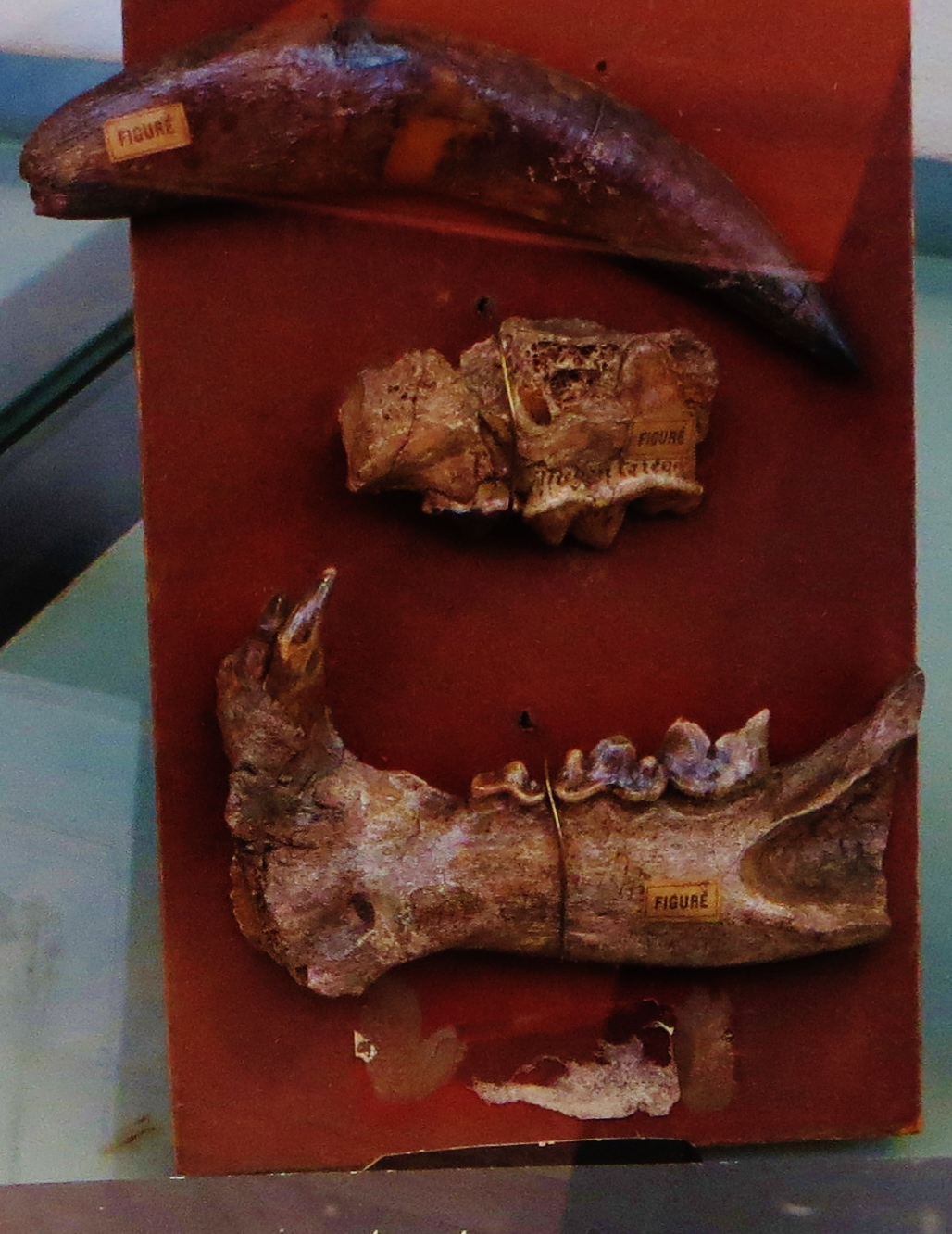
Teeth and jaw at the gallery of Paleontology and Comparative Anatomy, Paris

The number of species of Megantereon is highly controversial, with the number of valid species differing between authors. Historically some authors argued that there was just one species. M. cultridens, but all recent authors agree that there were at least two species, also including the African M. whitei, with some authors arguing for six or seven valid species.

Below is a list of named Megantereon species, almost certainly not all of which are valid:

- Megantereon cultridens (Cuvier, 1824) (type species)
- Megantereon megantereon (Croizet & Jobert, 1828)
- Megantereon adroveri Pons Moya, 1987
- Megantereon ekidoit Werdelin & Lewis, 2000
- Megantereon nihowanensis Tielhard de Chardin & Piveteau, 1930
- Megantereon inexpectatus Tielhard de Chardin, 1939
- Megantereon lantianensis Hu & Qi, 1978
- Megantereon macroscelis Pomel, 1853
- Megantereon falconeri Pomel, 1853
- Megantereon hesperus (Gazin, 1933)
- Megantereon microta Zhu et al., 2015
- Megantereon vakhshensis Sarapov, 1986
- Megantereon whitei Broom, 1937
- Megantereon gracile Broom, 1948
- Megantereon eurynodon Ewer, 1955

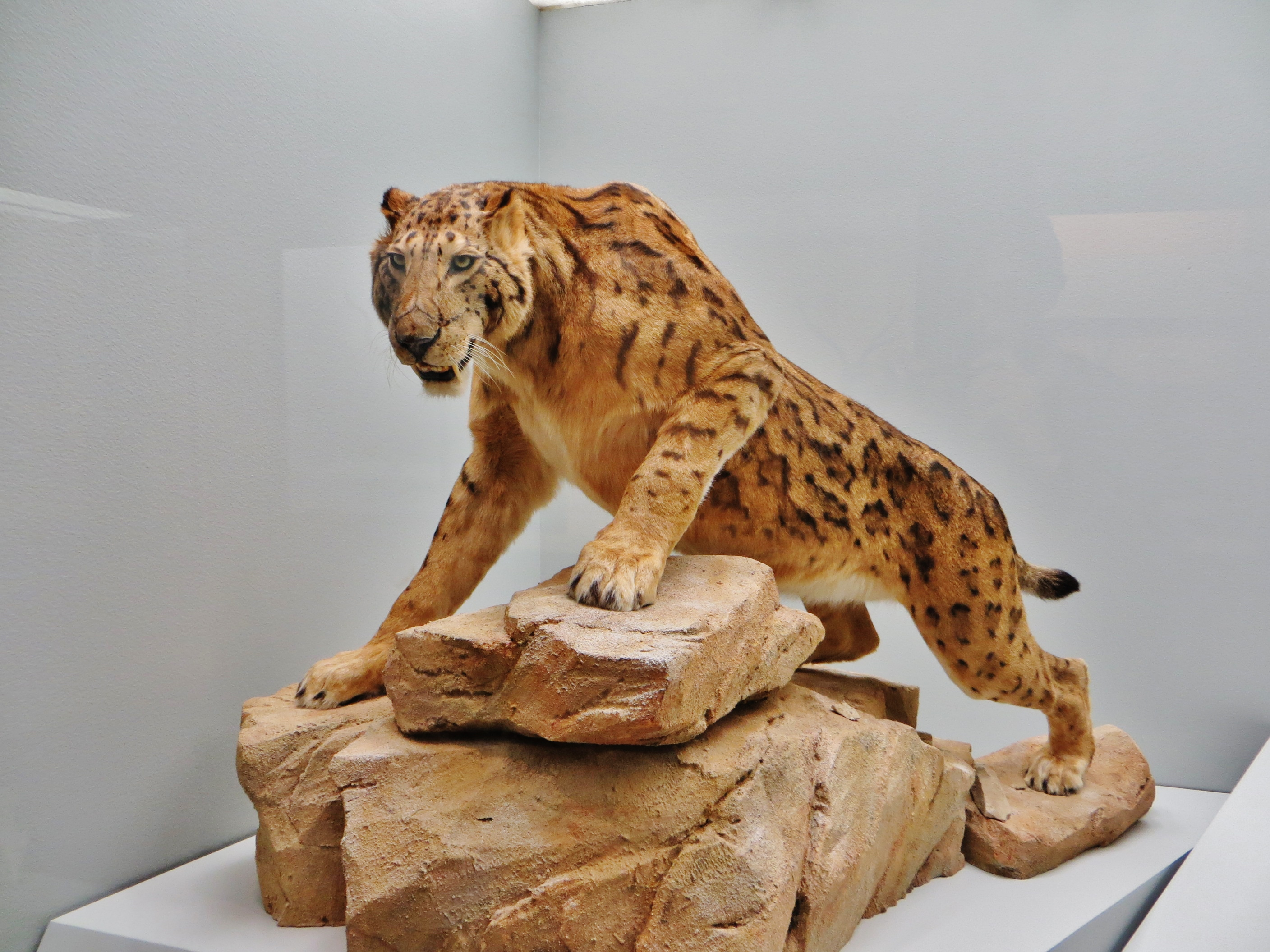
Model

Remains of Megantereon have been found in eastern and southern Africa, and across Eurasia. The origin of Megantereon is uncertain. Some authors have proposed that the North American M. hesperus is the ancestor of all later Megantereon species, first appearing during the early Pliocene, and dispersing over the Bering Land Bridge around 3.5-3.0 million years ago. Other authors have considered this species, whose holotype specimen is a fragmentary lower jaw, indeterminate remains of Smilodontini, and therefore suggest that Megantereon is only unambiguously known from Afro-Eurasia. Some authors have hypothesised that an early lineage of Megantereon was ancestral to Smilodon, though this has been disputed by others, who considered Smilodon and Megantereon to be sister groups. The oldest confirmed samples of Megantereon are known from Africa from the South Turkwel site in Kenya, dated to about 3–3.5 million years ago, with possible older records are known in Africa dating to 4.4 million years ago. The oldest possible record of Megantereon were recovered in the Toros Menalla site of Chad, dating to 7 million years ago. In Europe, the oldest remains are known from Les Etouaries (France), a site which is now dated to 2.78 million years ago, which represent among the oldest records of the genus in Euriasia.

Remains from the Pinjor zone of Siwalik Hills in the northern Indian Subcontinent dating to the Early Pleistocene have been attributed to the species M. falconeri. Some authors have attributed all remains of Megantereon in Asia to M. falconeri, but others consider the species confined to the Pinjor Formation of Siwalik Hills, northern Indian Subcontinent. Remains from Tajikistan in Central Asia were originally assigned to the species M. vakhscensis but this species is widely regarded as invalid and they are generally either considered either as M. cultridens or conspecific with the Indian species. Teeth, including canine saber teeth and premolars of an indeterminate small species of Megantereon have been reported from the island of Java in Indonesia. Although of uncertain provenance, they probably come from the late Early Pleistocene aged Sangiran complex.

Ficcarelli (1979), Turner (1987) and Sardella (1998) considered all European remains of the species to belong to the species M. cultridens, though most modern authors distinguish between an earlier M. cultridens, and a later, more advanced form of Megantereon in Europe of disputed classification. According to Martínez-Navarro, 1992, Martínez-Navarro and Palmqvist, 1995, Martínez-Navarro and Palmqvist, 1996, Palmqvist et al. (2007), and Li and Sun (2022), M. cultridens was replaced in Europe by the African M. whitei during the Early Pleistocene, around 1.8-2 million years ago, while others, including Werdelin and Flink (2018), and Lavrov et al. (2022) suggest that the advanced later European Megantereon instead represents a distinct species M. adroveri derived from M. cultridens.

In China, Early Pleistocene remains from Renzidong Caves in Anhui, eastern China, have been attributed to the species Megantereon megantereon (a species widely considered to be a synonym of M. cultridens by European authors), though others have considered them indeterminate to the genus. Remains from Yanliang Cave, Guangxi, southern China, have also been attributed to this species, but also to the separate species Megantereon microta or also considered indeterminate within the genus. The species Megantereon microta has been applied to remains from several localities in southern-central China, including Yanliang Cave, as well as Longgu Cave in Hubei. The species Megantereon inexpectatus was named for remains found in Zhoukoudian cave near Beijing. The species Megantereon nihowanensis was proposed in 1930 based on remains found in the Nihewan Basin in Hebei, northern China. In 2020, additional remains were assigned to this species from Sabretooth Cave, Chongzuo in southernmost Guanxi, China, near the border with Vietnam. Megantereon lantianensis was named for remains from Lantian, Shaanxi, central north China. Some authors have considered M. lantianensis as chonologically later than Machairodus nihowanensis in northern China, while others have considered M. lantianensis to be a synonym of Megantereon inexpectatus. Some authors have proposed that Megantereon inexpectatus is more closely related to the African M. whitei than to earlier Chinese Megantereon species.

In Africa, while most remains are attributed to M. whitei, some authors have attributed the earliest known remains of the genus on the continent (dating to around 3.58–3.2 million years ago) from the Turkwel locality in Kenya to the separate species Megantereon ekidoit, based on dental differences from later remains assigned to M. whitei.

== Description ==
External images
- Reconstruction of the head of Megantereon in various views
- Reconstruction of the head musculature of Megantereon

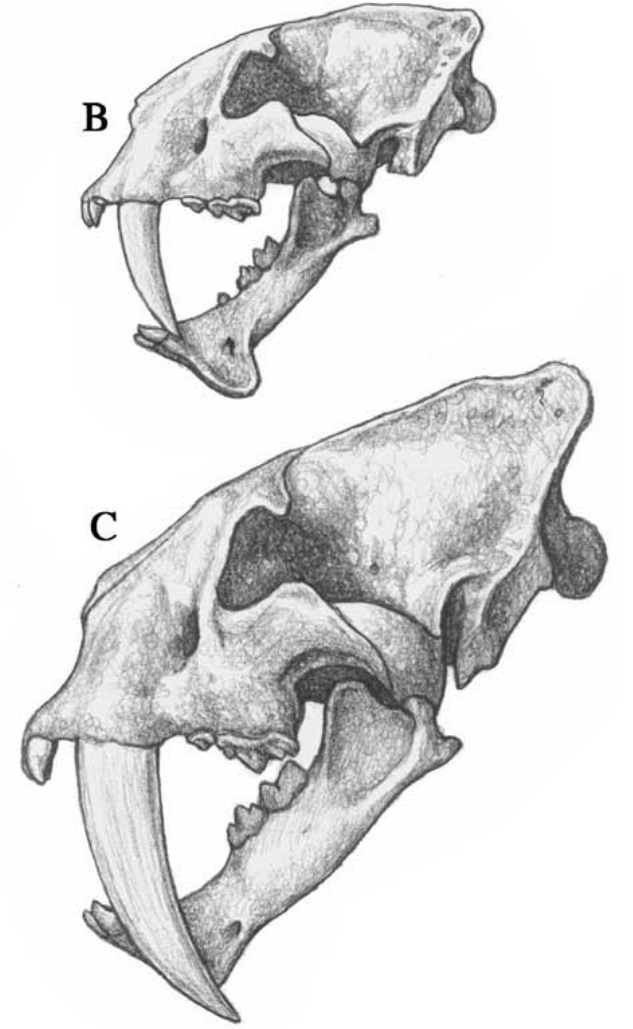
Skull of Megantereon (top/B) compared to that of its close relative Smilodon (bottom/C) in side-on view. Illustration by Mauricio Anton.

The skull of Megantereon is very similar in morphology and proportion to that of the closely related Smilodon, with both cats exhibiting very long upper canine teeth. A notable difference exists, however, in the presence of a pronounced mandibular flange in the former, projecting downwards near the front of the mandibles. This flange is shared with other, unrelated sabertooths, such as Barbourofelis and Eusmilus, but is notably absent in Smilodon. Other differences include the lack of serrations on the posterior edge of the upper canines in Megantereon (present in Smilodon) and a less exaggerated development of the mastoid process, among other relatively subtle differences in morphology. According to a 2024 study by Antón and colleagues, Megantereon's upper canines were most likely exposed in life, as suggested also for Smilodon.

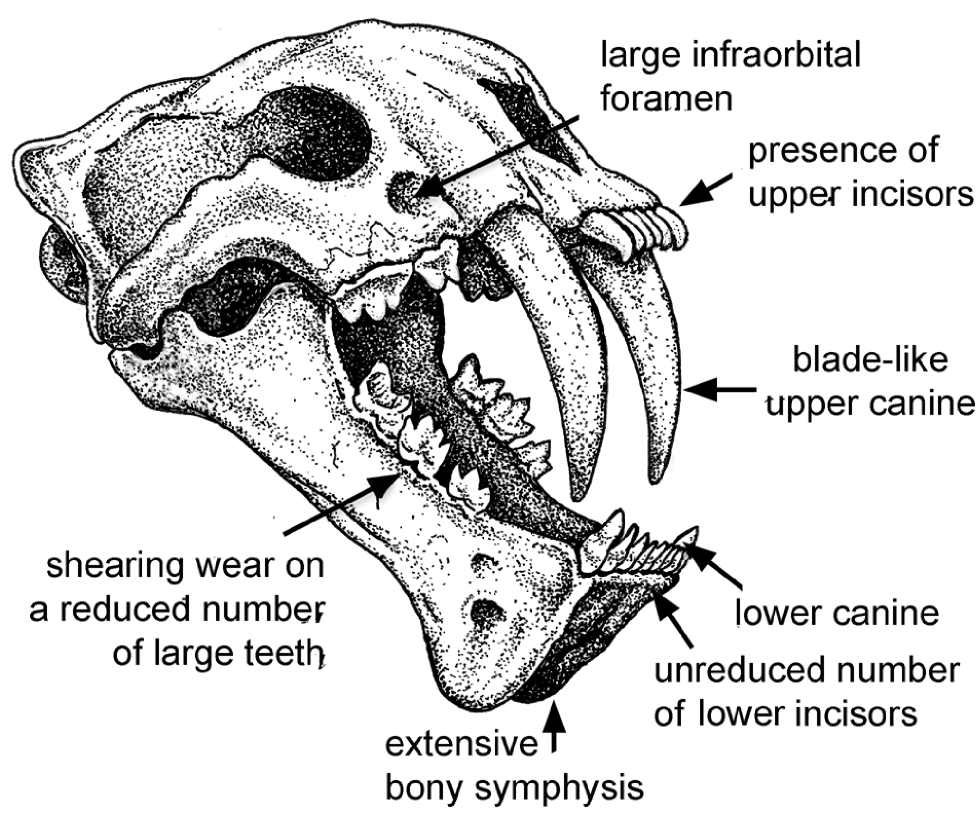
Skull of Megantereon in oblique view, highlighting a number of anatomical features

Species of Megantereon were comparable in size to living leopards or jaguars. Their body proportions were relatively similar to those of jaguars, but with a shorter tail, a longer neck, proportionally larger vertebrae and a reduced number of vertebrae in the lumbar region, resulting in a proportionally shorter back than in feline cats. The forelimbs and shoulder of Megantereon were powerfully built with a proportionally large scapulae, while the hindlimbs were relatively more gracile and around 10% longer than the forelimbs. The limbs were relatively short, particularly the lower (distal) parts.

The largest species within the genus was M. falconeri, with a 1995 study estimating body weight of 89.2–146.4 kg (196 lb 10 oz – 322 lb 12 oz) for Siwalik Megantereon with an average body weight of 120 kg (260 lb). The North American species, M. hesperus, was estimated to have weighed between 62.8–76.3 kg (138 lb 7 oz – 168 lb 3 oz), with an average body weight of 67.7 kg (149 lb 4 oz) in the same study. The African M. whitei was estimated to have a body weight of 66.6 kg (146 lb 13 oz) while specimens of Megantereon from the Early Pleistocene of Spain, attributed to Megantereon cultridens adroveri were estimated to have had a body mass of 52.8 kg (116 lb 6 oz). These estimates were based on the size of the lower carnassial tooth. A 1996 study based on the size of the cross-section of the humerus, suggested a body weight of about 100 kg (220 lb) for a specimen of Megantereon from the Early Pleistocene of Greece (attributed in the paper to M. whitei). A 2007 study estimated a body mass of a large specimen of Megantereon cultridens (SE311 from Senéze, France) as 100–110 kg (220–240 lb), with a body length of 160 cm (63 in; 5 ft 3 in). Mauricio Anton's reconstruction in The Big Cats and their Fossil Relatives depicts the full specimen found at 72 cm (28 in; 2 ft 4 in) at the shoulder.

== Palaeobiology and paleoecology ==
=== Predatory behavior ===
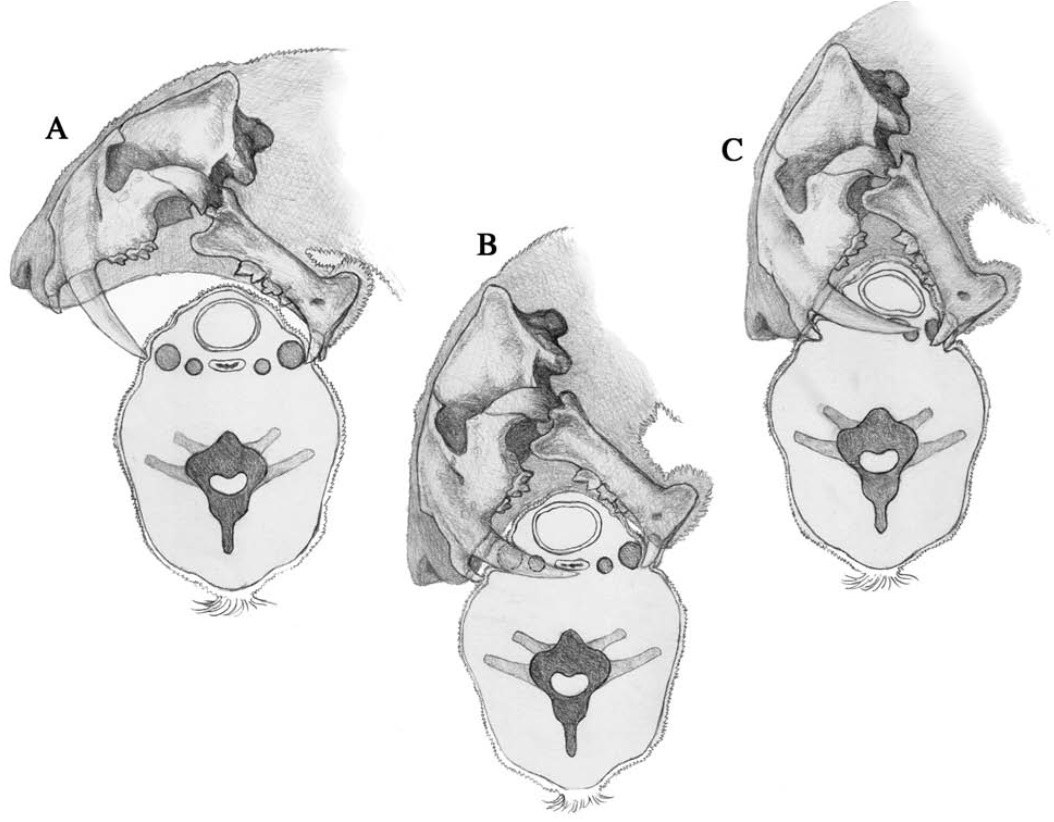
Diagram of Megantereon performing a killing "canine shear bite" on the throat (orientated bottom up) of a prey animal, penetrating the esophagus and major blood vessels. Artwork by Mauricio Anton.

Megantereon is thought to have been an ambush predator. It is thought to have used its powerful forelimbs to restrain prey to deliver a fatal "canine-shear" throat bite, severing most of the victim's major nerves and blood vessels. To this end, it is thought to have used its powerful neck muscles to rotate the skull downward, forcing its saber teeth into the victim's neck, while the lower jaw served as an anchor. While the teeth would still risk damage, the prey animal would be killed quickly enough that any struggling would be feeble at best. In a study from 2007, Christiansen estimated that a M. cultridens of 106.1 kg (234 lb) may have had a bite force of 297.5 N or 66.9 lbf at the canines.

Megantereon also had relatively small carnassial teeth, indicating that once making a kill, it would have eaten its prey at a leisurely pace, either hidden deep in bushes or in a tree away from potential rivals. This indicates a similarity to modern leopards and their lifestyle in that it was probably solitary. Whether and to what extent Megantereon would have been scansorial and therefore able to climb trees is debated. Arguments in favor rest upon comparisons to modern leopards, and their avoidance of larger predators by the caching of kills in trees. For Megantereon, likely competitors would have included the fellow machairodont Homotherium and the hyena Pachycrocuta. Homotherium is often thought to have dominated Megantereon, thanks to its generally larger size and putative social lifestyle. This picture is somewhat reversed, however, at Zhoukoudian, China, where unusually small Homotherium specimens apparently coexisted with particularly large Megantereon specimens. Given that the latter was considerably stockier, this may have reversed the normal dominance relationship. Other experts dispute that Megantereon would have been unable to climb proficiently due to its heavy build, and argue that its relatively small claws, stocky limbs and short tail argue against regular climbing. In this case Megantereon would have been unlike the earlier Promegantereon (thought to be its ancestor), but similar to the later Smilodon, which is believed to have spent its time on the ground. Some experts argue even if Megantereon was scansorial, its large, laterally flattened canines would have prevented it from dragging kills long distances or tree caching as seen with leopards. Neuroanatomy of M. cultridens suggests this species of Megantereon was probably scansorial or developed mobility in three dimensions due to morphology and size of the cerebellum.

Experts have argued that Megantereon consumed exclusively soft tissues and would have left a significant amount of carrion to other predators much like modern cheetahs, with the felid's leftovers probably being frequently being scavenged by both hominins and hyaenids. The abundance of carcasses generated by Megantereon has been proposed as a facilitator of early hominin expansion out of Africa. However, this interpretation has been called into question as dental microwear suggests M. whitei, which is known for its specialized dentition, has durophagy on more similar to felids such as lions than cheetahs.

=== Ecology ===
Isotopic analysis of Megantereon (assigned in these studies to M. whitei) from the Venta Micena locality in southeast Spain dating to the Early Pleistocene, around 1.6 million years ago, suggests that at this locality Megantereon hunted large, mainly forest-associated ungulates, including the equine Equus altidens, the muskox-relative Soergelia, and the giant deer Praemegaceros, probably ambushing prey at the border between forest and savannah. It overlapped in diet somewhat with the "European jaguar" Panthera gombaszogensis with which shared its forested habitat, while the larger sabertooth Homotherium latidens and the pack hunting canine Xenocyon lycaonoides are thought to have inhabited more open habitats. Other animals found at the site include the "southern mammoth" Mammuthus meridionalis, and the large hippo Hippopotamus antiquus.

Within the Senéze locality of France, M. cultridens coexisted with primates such as Paradolichopithecus arvernensis and Macaca sylvanus, the proboscidean Mammuthus meridionalis, the equine Equus and the large rhino Stephanorhinus etruscus, the suid Sus strozzii, cervids such as Croizetoceros ramosus, Metacervocerus philisi, Eucladoceros ctenoides, and Libralces gallicus, bovids such as Gazellospira torticornis, Megalovis latifrons, Gallogoral meneghinii, Pliotragus ardeus, and Leptobos furtivus, and carnivorans present included felids such as Acinonyx pardinensis and Homotherium, canids such as Canis senezensis, Vulpes alopecoides, Nyctereutes megamastoides, hyenas such as Pliocrocuta perrieri and Chasmaporthetes lunenesis, and the ursid Ursus etruscus.

A 2023 isotope study of fossils found in the Turkana Basin in Kenya, suggested that M. whitei preyed on animals with a mean mass of 72 kg (159 lb); this would have likely included the antelopes Aepyceros, Antidorcas recki, Megalotragus, Kobus sigmoidalis and Tragelaphus, the swines Kolpochoerus limnetes and Metridiochoerus andrewsi, and the three-toed equine Eurygnathohippus ethiopicum. Its diet was suggested to have overlapped with that of the contemporary hyena Crocuta ultra. Within the Djurab desert in northern Chad, Megantereon coexisted with machairodonts such as Amphimachairodus kabir, Lokotunjailurus, Tchadailurus and Dinofelis. Additional animals included crocodiles, three-toed horses, fish, monkeys, hippos, aardvarks, turtles, rodents, giraffes, snakes, antelopes, pigs, mongooses, foxes, hyenas, otters, honey badgers and the hominid Sahelanthropus. Based on the available fossils, it is theorized that the Djurab was once the shore of a lake, generally forested close to the shore with savannah-like areas some distance away. The number of felids suggests the Djurab desert had a diverse of habitats that was filled with diverse herbivores. Examinations of the reconstructed brain of Megantereon cultridens published in 2026 suggest behavioral and ecological plasticity comparable to the extant cougar and jaguar. This same study likewise vindicates evidence of Megantereon being scansorial. These adaptations would have been necessary to the animal's ability to survive in habitats with high degrees of intraguild competition and high diversity of medium to large felids, including other machairodonts.

Although a skull of Homo erectus georgicus (D2280) from Dmanisi in Georgia has been suggested to display bite marks by Megantereon, other authors have suggested that the bite marks cannot be attributed with certainty to Megantereon, and that the giant hyena Pachycrocuta or a member of the big cat genus Panthera are more likely culprits. A 2000 isotope study of remains from the Early Pleistocene Swartkrans cave in South Africa suggests that at this locality Megantereon preyed on hominins, including Paranthropus robustus and early Homo, as well as baboons.

M. nihowanensis was a member of the "Gigantopithecus fauna" of southern China. Contemporary fauna includes the giant ape Gigantopithecus, and extinct species of orangutan (Pongo), proboscideans such as Sinomastodon and Stegodon, rhinoceroses of the genus Rhinoceros, and tapirs (Tapirus). Its rarity in southern China suggests M. nihowensis was not well adapted for closed forests compared to contemporary Panthera, instead open forests or steppe with shrubs are far more ideal environments.

== Extinction ==
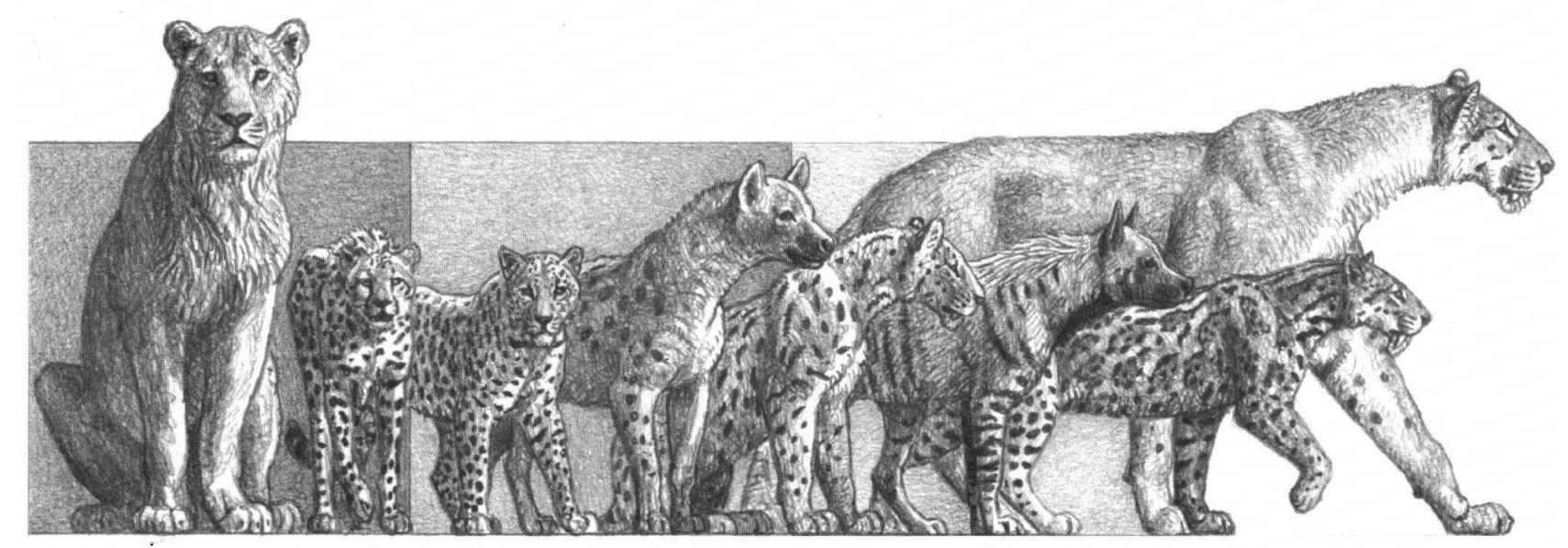
M. cultridens (front right) and other large carnivores from the Plio-Pleistocene of East Africa, including extant ones, by Antón

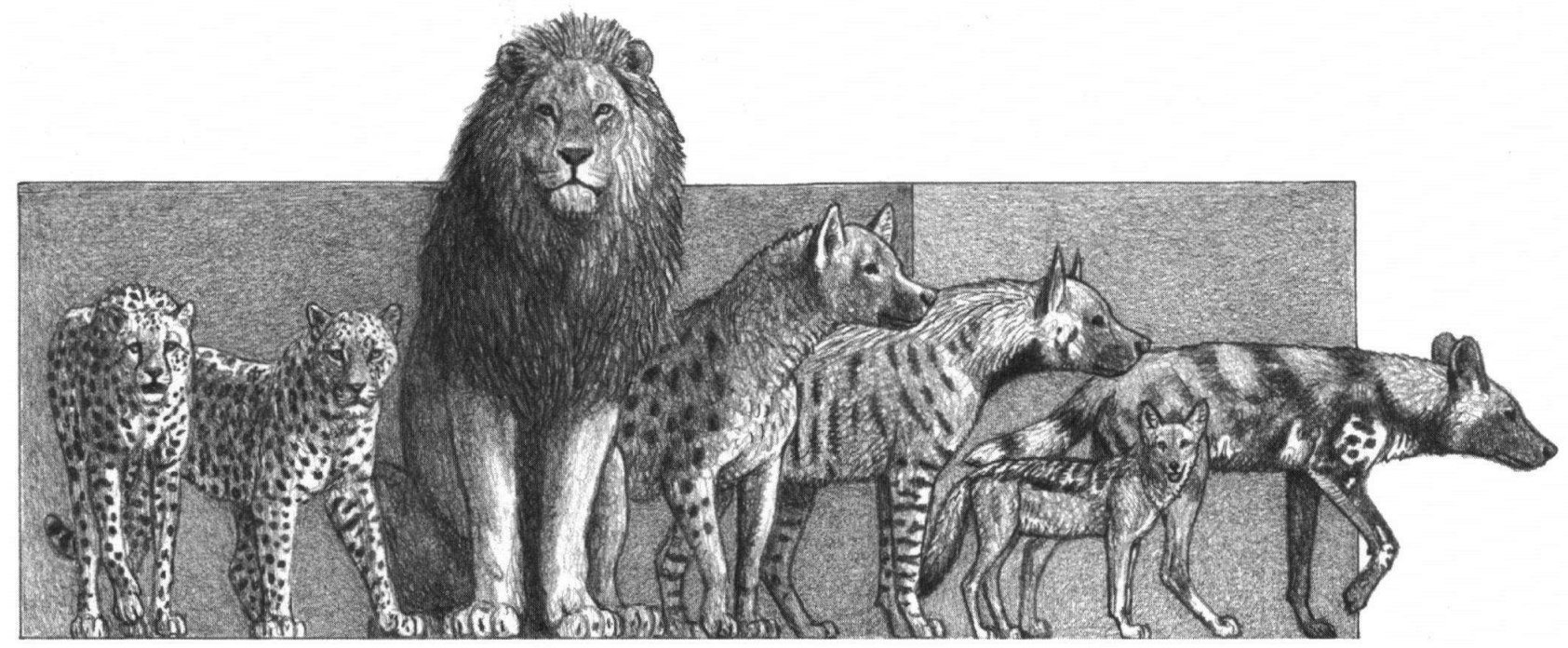
Large carnivores from late Pleistocene and recent East Africa. A notable difference to the previous picture is the addition of the canids Lycaon pictus and Lupulella mesomelas (on the right), and the disappearance of all three sabertoothed cats: M. cultridens, Homotherium latidens (back right in the previous picture) and Dinofelis (fourth from the right in the previous picture), all of which disappeared from the region in the middle Pleistocene.

Megantereon became extinct in East Africa probably no later than around 1.4 Ma, having become extinct in Africa by 1.3 Ma. The cause of their extinction in Africa has been a matter of debate among researchers. Antón (2013) suggested that the extinction of Megantereon and Homotherium in Africa coincided with Homo ergaster becoming widespread, and that the smaller size and solitary behavior of Megantereon would have made it a more suitable target for human scavenging compared to the larger, likely gregarious Homotherium.

Faurby and colleagues (2020) found that large carnivore extinctions during the Pliocene and Pleistocene of East Africa correlated with an increase in hominin brain size and vegetation changes, namely a reduction in forest cover, but not with changes in precipitation or climate. Moreover, they found that of all the tested factors, only hominin brain size increase could conclusively explain these extinctions. During the Plio-Pleistocene, East Africa witnessed the extinction of a large bear (Agriotherium), several species of giant civet, a large mustelid (Plesiogulo), and ten species of hyenas, as well the complete disappearance of the formerly widespread and diverse saber-toothed cats including Megantereon. Faurby and colleagues argued that early hominins were primarily responsible for these extinctions, initially via scavenging and takeover of carcasses, later followed by direct competition for prey animals as hominins became more adept hunters. In a direct response to this study, Faith et al. (2020), questioned their analysis. They argued the analysis by Faurby and colleagues showed forest cover was relatively unimportant predictor of the proportion of large carnivorans, which heavily relied on modern carnivorans. They argued that relying on modern carnivorans limits the ability to make inferences about the past in which ecosystems were fundamentally different, they also argued that present day ecosystems are missing large-bodied predators such as machairodonts. Instead, they argued that the expansion of grasslands and loss of forest covers were more detrimental to the large carnivorans as well the decline of megaherbivores. They also argued that the evidence for anthropogenic extinctions by pre-erectus hominins to have been inconclusive, as it would suggest australopiths and early Homo were stealing prey from large carnivorans long before visible archaeological or anatomical evidence of carnivory among hominins.

Although this interpretation has been questioned by Domínguez-Rodrigo et al. (2021) as they suggested early Pleistocene hominins were primary consumers not scavengers. They argued Faith et al. assumed that small-carnivore extinctions should have preceded large carnivore extinctions from competition with homininis without support. They also argued the assumption is ecologically unjustified as zooarchaeological evidence suggests by 2.6 Ma, hominins were targeting medium sized prey, which affects large carnivores than smaller carnivores. They also found ancient anthropogenic extinctions can be supported by data provided by Faith et al. as there was an abrupt decline of large carnivores around 1.8 Ma, due to the higher specialization on flesh, megapredators were more vulnerable than mesopredators. Additionally, they found little evidence of large carnivorans relying on megaherbivores. Additionally, recent analysis found stone damaged bones may have been already widespread around 3-2.58 Ma.

Palmqvist et al. 2021 argued that Megantereon likely persisted longer in Eurasia due to the later development of Acheulean tools. The youngest remains of the genus in Europe date to around 1 Ma, becoming extinct in the region during the mid-Pleistocene transition possibly to climatic change, which made the region more arid and increased open grassland habitat at the expense of forest. The youngest remains in East Asia (which are the youngest records of the genus globally) date to the Middle Pleistocene sometime between 780,000 and 350,000 years ago, and are attributed to the species Megantereon inexpectatus. Li and Boyang (2022) hypothesized that the extinction of Megantereon in Asia was the result of competition with Homo, as they dispersed out of Africa to avoid competition with early humans. However, this is questionable as Megantereon continued to be associated with early humans after their dispersal out of Africa, which suggests Megantereon didn’t experience severe stress from early humans stealing carcasses.
