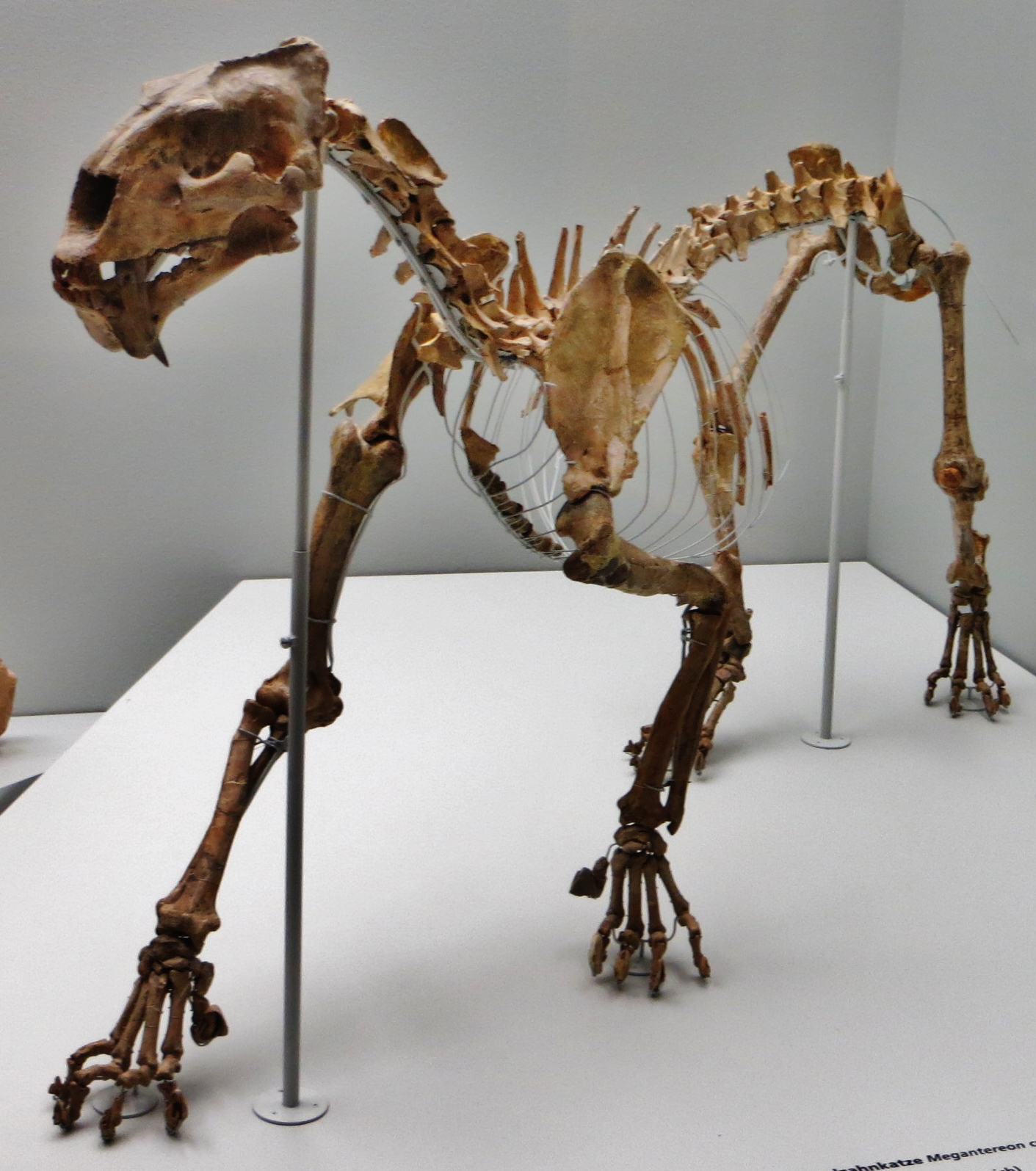
- Skeleton of Megantereon

Scientific classification
- Kingdom: Animalia
- Phylum: Chordata
- Class: Mammalia
- Order: Carnivora
- Family: Felidae
- Subfamily: †Machairodontinae
- Tribe: †Smilodontini; Kretzoi, 1929

Genera
- †Megantereon; †Paramachaerodus?; †Promegantereon?; †Rhizosmilodon?; †Smilodon

= Smilodontini =

Smilodontini Temporal range: Late Pliocene - Holocene, 3.6–0.0082 Ma

Extinct tribe of carnivores

Smilodontini is an extinct tribe within the Machairodontinae or "saber-toothed cat" subfamily of the Felidae. The tribe is also known as the "dirk-toothed cats". They were found in South America, North America, Europe, Asia, and Africa during the Late Pliocene to early Holocene, from 3.6 mya—8,200 years ago.

As the name suggests, the famous genus of Smilodon is part of this group, but there are also three other distinct genera in Smilodontini. The earliest known genus of the tribe is Promegantereon, once thought to be a species of Paramachaerodus. However, recent phylogenetic analyses suggested the tribe only consisted of Megantereon and Smilodon, with the Promegantereon, Paramachaerodus, and Rhizosmilodon, being placed within Metailurini.

== Description ==
The various members of Smilodontini are generally distinguished by their long, narrow upper canines. However, the stockiness often seen as one of the tribe's signature features varied between the different genera. Promegantereon and Paramachaerodus for example, were likely arboreal or at the least, scansorial, given their moderately long tails, large dewclaws and smaller, slender builds. These species also had relatively small upper canines for their size, though they already showed the flat, blade-like edges that defined them as those of machairodonts. Megantereon, a later species, was more intermediate in physiology between these earlier forms and the more cursorial Rhizosmilodon and Smilodon itself, which were better built for life on ground, as well as bringing down relatively larger prey.

== Classification ==
Tribe †Smilodontini
Genus	Species	Image
†Megantereon Croizet & Jobert, 1828	†M. cultridens; †M. ekidoit; †M. hesperus; †M. inexpectatus; †M. microta; †M. nihowanensis; †M. vakhshensis; †M. whitei	
†Paramachairodus Pilgrim, 1913	†P. maximiliani; †P. orientalis; †P. transasiaticus; †P. yingliangi	
†Promegantereon Kretzoi, 1938	†P. ogygia	
†Rhizosmilodon Wallace & Hulbert, 2013	†R. fiteae	
†Smilodon Lund, 1842	†S. fatalis; †S. gracilis; †S. populator	

=== Phylogeny ===
The phylogenetic relationships of Smilodontini are shown in the following cladogram:

- †Smilodontini
  - - - - †Megantereon
          - - - †Megantereon cultridens
              - †Megantereon ekidoit
            - †Megantereon whitei
          - †Megantereon hesperus
          - †Megantereon inexpectatus
          - †Megantereon microta
          - †Megantereon nihowanensis
          - †Megantereon vakhshensis
        - †Smilodon
          - †Smilodon gracilis
          - - †Smilodon fatalis
            - †Smilodon populator
      - †Rhizosmilodon
        †Rhizosmilodon fiteae
    - †Paramachairodus
      - †Paramachairodus maximiliani
      - †Paramachairodus orientalis
      - †Paramachairodus transasiaticus
  - †Promegantereon
    †Promegantereon ogygia

== Paleobiology ==
Like all machairodonts, smilodontins were equipped to hunt and kill prey in a manner that was seemingly quicker and more efficient than what is seen in modern cats like the Pantherinae. Using their elongated canines, smilodontins would aim for the vital spots of the neck or belly (the exact placement of such bites is still hotly debated among experts), killing either by disembowelment of by severing major arteries such as the carotid. The enlarged carnassials would then be used to shear meat from the bones as the cat fed. In regards to feeding habits, the carnassials of Megantereon suggest that it was a loner that fed at leisurely paces in deep bushes or in trees, while Smilodon on the other end of the spectrum, lived in what was probably a highly competitive environment and in addition, seems to have been social, suggesting a need to eat as much as possible without losing a meal to scavengers.
