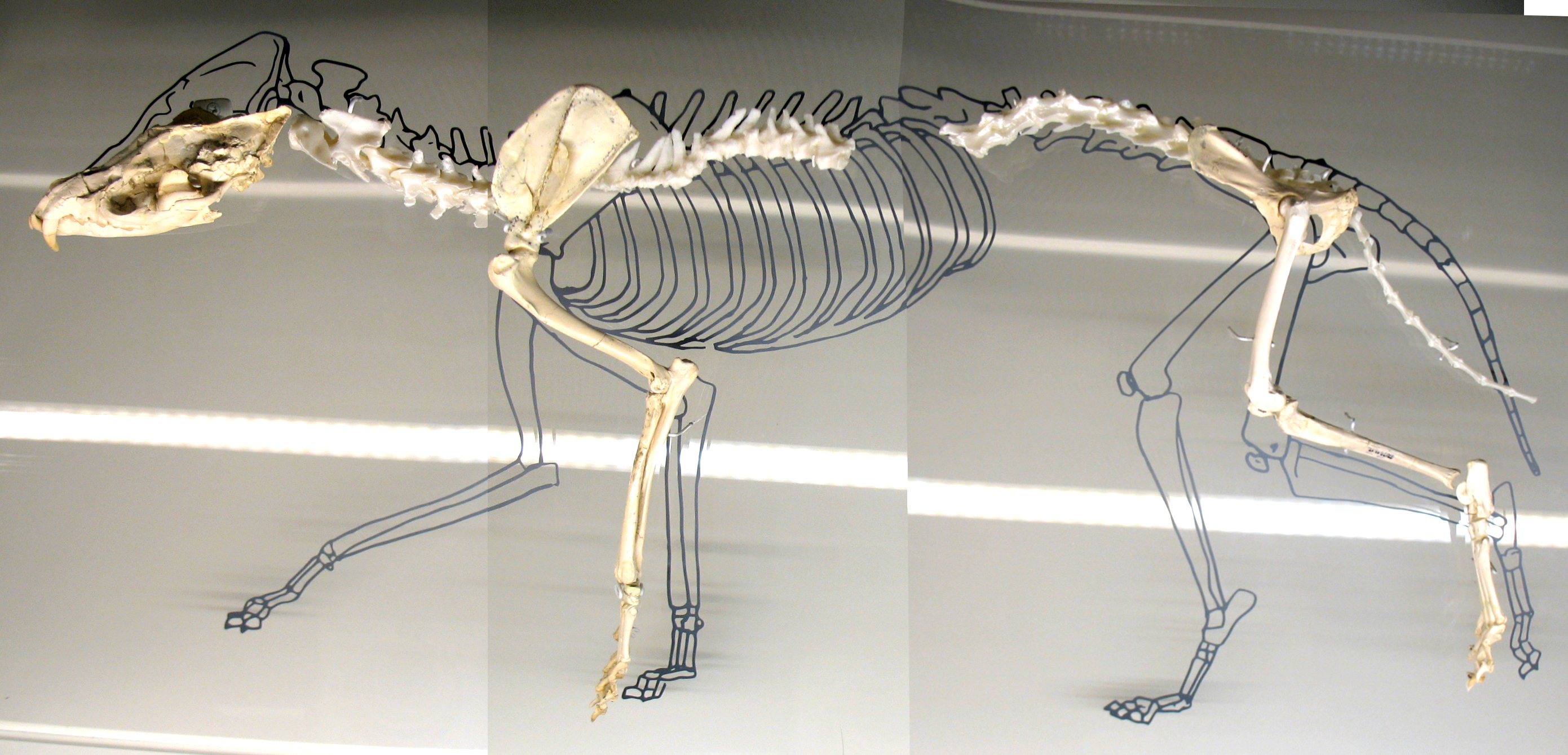
- P. crassum from Batallones Fossil Site 1 (Madrid, Spain)

Scientific classification
- Kingdom: Animalia
- Phylum: Chordata
- Class: Mammalia
- Order: Carnivora
- Family: Hyaenidae
- Subfamily: †Ictitheriinae
- Genus: †Protictitherium; Kretzoi, 1938

Species
- P. crassum Depéret, 1892; P. gaillardi Major, 1903; P. llopisi Pairó & Petter, 1969; P. punicum Kurtén, 1976; P. cingulatum Schmidt-Kittler, 1976; P. intermedium Schmidt-Kittler, 1976; P. sumegense Kretzoi, 1984; P. thessalonikensis Koufos, 2012

= Protictitherium =

Protictitherium Temporal range: 16–7.2 Ma Miocene

Extinct genus of carnivores

Protictitherium (gr. first striking beast) is an extinct genus of hyena that lived across Europe and Asia during the Middle and Late Miocene, it is often considered to be the first hyena since it contains some of the oldest fossils of the family. They were especially prolific in Turkey, where every species has been registered.

== Description ==
Protictitherium was akin to civets both in size, being around 50 cm (19 inches) tall at their shoulder; and in weight, with calculations suggesting something around 4–8 kg (8-18 lb), with differences between species. It has been suggested that Protictitherium was a partly arboreal predator, due to their semi-retractable claws, perhaps to avoid larger predators . While they possessed somewhat large molars and premolars, their bite wasn't remarkably strong.

== Species ==
There are generally three recognized species in the genus Protictitherium, though there are some that suggest that species in the genus Tungurictis should be considered a part of Protictitherium.

=== Protictitherium crassum ===
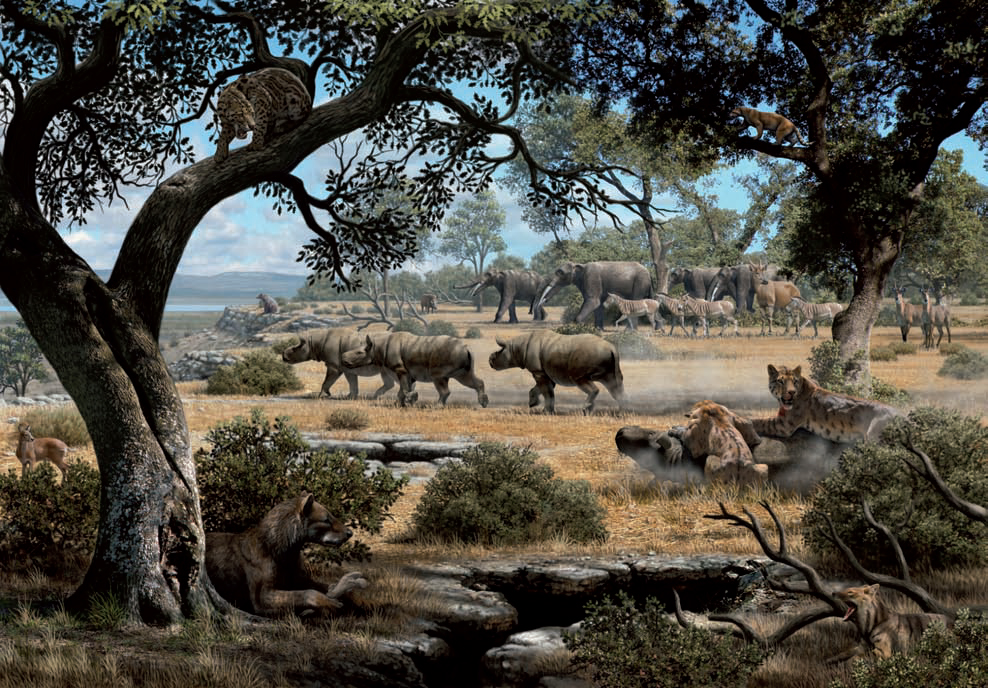
Vallesian environment and fauna of Cerro de los Batallones including P. crassum (foreground), by Mauricio Antón

The type and largest species, it was originally recovered by Charles Depéret in 1892 as a member of the genus Herpestes (Herpestes crassus) and it wouldn't be until 1938 that Kretzoi understood it as a new genus, erecting Protictitherium. locomotive analysis of "P. crassum" suggest that, due to the proportions of its humerus, femur, pelvis, and scapula, it wasn't adapted to an arboreal lifestyle, rather to a cursorial locomotion in open woodlands. This species existed from 17 to 5 million years ago through Europe and Asia. Despite having existed for over a million years it remained fairly unchanged; specimens separated by large stretches of time possess slightly different proportions of their first molar.

Five species have been synonymized to P. crassum: P. aegeum, P. csakvarense, P. gaillardi, P. llopisi, P. thesalonikensis, and P. sumegense. Its specific name, crassum, means thick or robust in Latin.

=== Protictitherium cingulatum ===
Originally described in 1976 by Schmidt-Kittler, it is neither the biggest nor smallest species in the genus. P. cingulatum possesses somewhat primitive characteristics in its mandible, like a higher protoconid in relation to its paraconid on its first molar. Its holotype hails from the Yeni Eskihisar formation, from the late Miocene of Turkey, where it coexisted with P. crassum for at least a million years, implying some manner of niche partitioning where P. cingulatum opted for an arboreal lifestyle. Its specific name, cingulatum, means cingulate in Latin, in reference to its highly developed dental cingulum.

=== Protictitherium intermedium ===
The second species described by Schmidt-Kittler in 1976, it is known from localities in Çandir and Paçalar of Turkey's Middle Miocene. It possesses the typical mandibular characters of Protictitherium and is characterized by its further developed talonid in its first molar and a larger second molar. It seems to represent the ancestral condition of the genus, therefore it's often recovered as a common ancestor of the other species, hence its specific name intermedium, intermediate in Latin.
