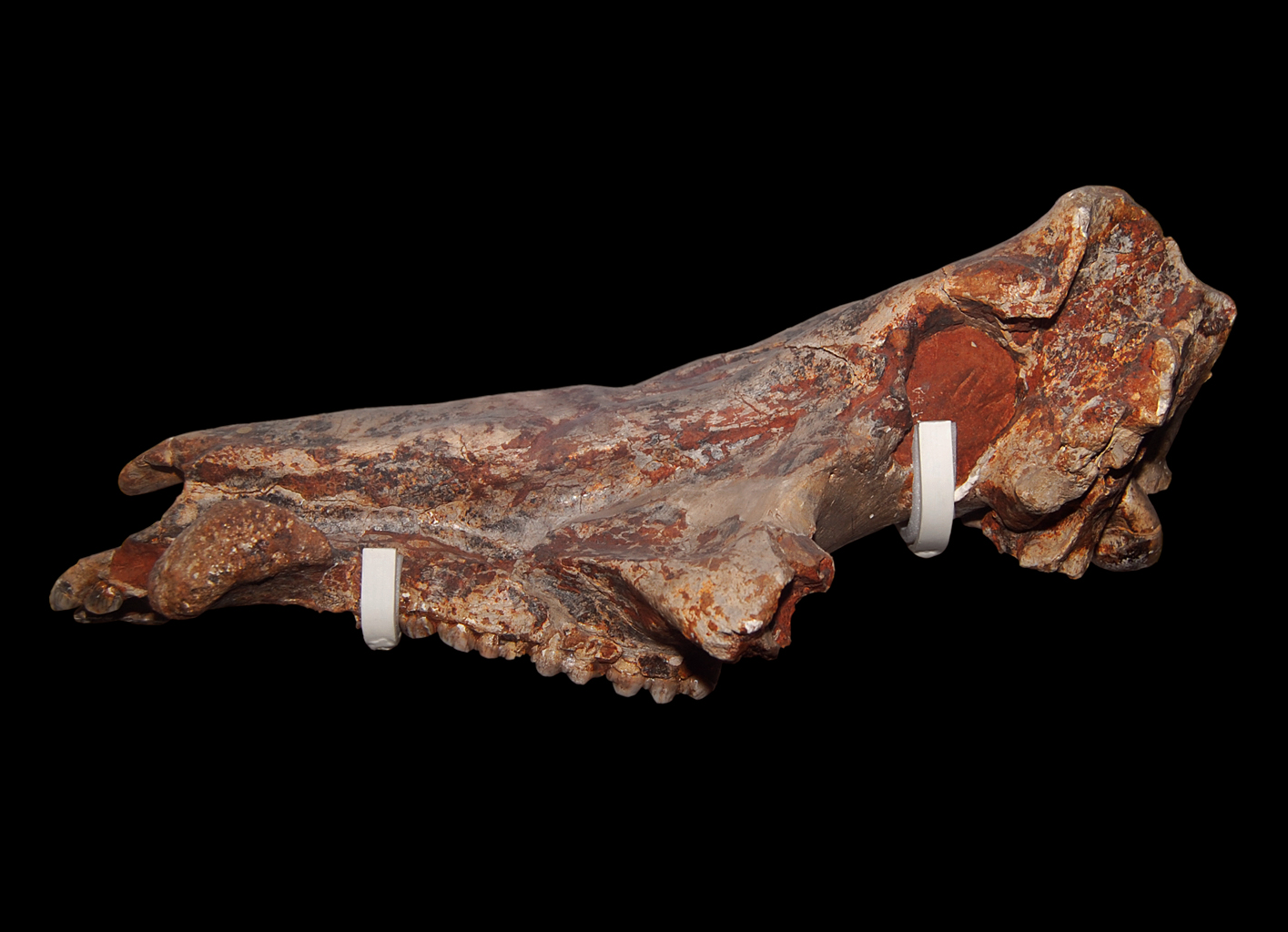
- Skull

Scientific classification
- Kingdom: Animalia
- Phylum: Chordata
- Class: Mammalia
- Order: Artiodactyla
- Family: Suidae
- Genus: †Microstonyx; Pilgrim 1926

Species
- †M. binxianensis; †M. major; †M. antiquus

= Microstonyx =

Microstonyx Temporal range: 11.608–7.246 Ma

Extinct genus of mammals

Microstonyx was an extinct genus of suid that existed during the Miocene in Asia and Europe.

== Geographic range ==
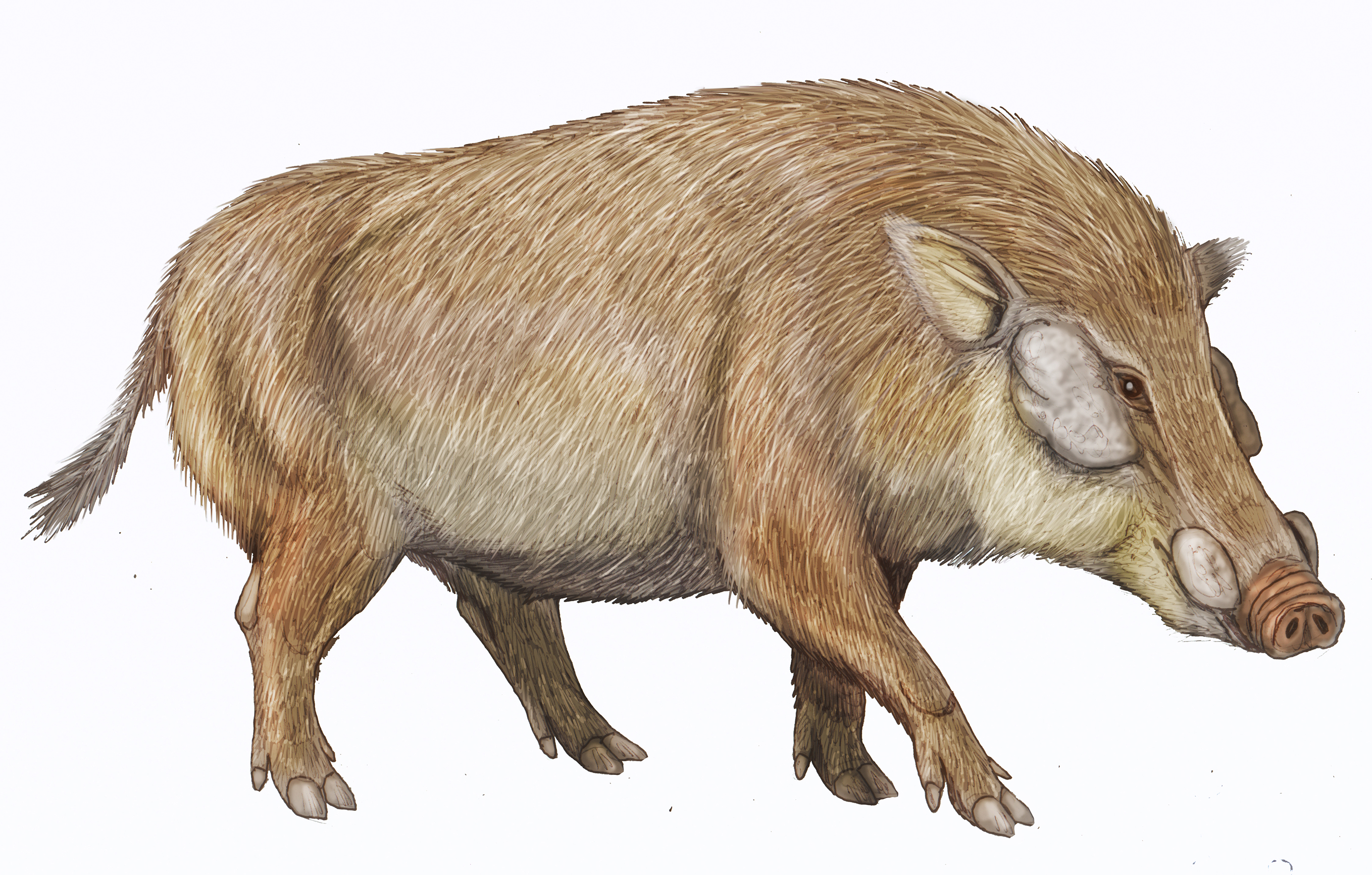
Life restoration

Fossils of the species M. major have been found in Spain, North Macedonia, Turkiye, and China.
