= 2022 in paleomammalogy =

This paleomammology list records new fossil mammal taxa that were described during the year 2022, as well as notes other significant paleomammalogy discoveries and events which occurred during 2022.

== Afrotherians ==
=== Proboscidea ===
Name	Novelty	Status	Authors	Age	Type locality	Country	Notes	Images
Platybelodon tetralophus	Sp. nov	Valid	Wang & Li	Miocene	Tunggur Formation	China		
Stegotetrabelodon emiratus	Sp. nov	Valid	Sanders	Miocene	Baynunah Formation	United Arab Emirates		

==== Proboscidean research ====
- A study on the landscape-scale patterns in diet of mammoths and mastodons is published by Pardi & DeSantis (2022), who report evidence indicating that mammoths had significant dietary preferences for grass, but also engaged in more mixed-feeding in the areas outside the most environmentally suitable parts of their distribution, while the dietary preferences for mastodons were less resolved.
- Partial skeleton of a specimen of "Mammut" borsoni, representing one of the most recent record of mammutids in Europe reported to date, is described from the Villafranchian of Kaltensundheim (Thuringia, Germany) by Koenigswald et al. (2022).
- A study on patterns of landscape use by "Buesching mastodon" (recovered in 1998 from a peat farm near Fort Wayne, Indiana, United States) during its life is published by Miller et al. (2022), who interpret their findings as indicative of shifts in landscape use by this individual during adolescence and following maturation to adulthood, including increased monthly movements and development of a summer-only range and mating ground.
- A study on the carbon and oxygen isotope ratios in teeth of a sub-adult mastodon found in southern Brazil is published by Lopes et al. (2022), who interpret their findings as indicative of a diet shift during the life of the animal, and indicating that mastodons were able to change their diets at shorter timescales than can be addressed from the analysis of isolated teeth.
- Fossil material of a member or a relative of the genus Sinomastodon is described from the Quaternary of the Kashmir Valley by Parray et al. (2022), representing the youngest record of a gomphothere from the Indian Subcontinent reported to date.
- A study on the osteological anomalies in the vertebrae of Notiomastodon platensis from a new late Pleistocene site at Anolaima (Cundinamarca, Colombia) is published by Zorro-Luján et al. (2022), who interpret the studied anomalies as the result of nutritional deficiencies in essential minerals, caused by environmental stresses which were possibly related to the late Pleistocene environmental instability.
- Mothé et al. (2022) describe new fossil material of Notiomastodon platensis from three Pleistocene sites in the Valle del Cauca Department (Colombia), and interpret the distribution of the fossil material of N. platensis as indicating that this proboscidean used the inter-Andean valleys as migratory corridors, avoiding more prominent Andean hills.
- A study on the origin, dispersal and ecology of gomphotheres in South America is published by Alberdi & Prado (2022).
- Evidence indicating that the shovel-tusked gomphotheres from Florida (Amebelodon floridanus, Konobelodon britti, Serbelodon barbourensis) were leaf browsers that also ingested bark and twigs, using their upper tusks for scraping and slicing and their lower tusks for shoveling substrate (S. barbourensis and K. britti) or stripping and scraping (A. floridanus), is presented by Semprebon, Pirlo & Dudek (2022).
- A study on the range of size variation in palaeoloxodont elephants from Sicily, Favignana and Malta, inhabiting the Siculo-Maltese Palaeoarchipelago during the Pleistocene, and on possible reasons for size differences of these elephants is published by Scarborough (2022).
- A study on the morphological variation of samples of steppe mammoth and woolly mammoth remains, focusing on ca. 240,000-126,000 samples from Britain and the adjacent continent, is published by Lister (2022), providing evidence of a complex pattern of change in the transition from the steppe mammoth to the woolly mammoth in Europe.
- Evidence from woolly mammoth genomes (including genomes of two new Siberian specimens), indicating that genomic insertions and large deletions likely contributed to adaptive phenotypic evolution of the woolly mammoths, is presented by van der Valk et al. (2022).

=== Sirenia ===
Name	Novelty	Status	Authors	Age	Type locality	Country	Notes	Images
Dakhlasiren	Gen. et sp. nov	In press	Zouhri, Zalmout & Gingerich	Late Eocene	Samlat Formation	Morocco	A member of the family Protosirenidae. The type species is D. marocensis.	

==== Sirenian research ====
- A study on the phylogenetic relationships and evolutionary history of extant and fossil sirenians is published by Heritage & Seiffert (2022).
- Description of the anatomy of the skull of Sobrarbesiren cardieli and a study on the affinities of this taxon is published by Díaz-Berenguer et al. (2022).

== Euarchontoglires ==
=== Primates ===
Name	Novelty	Status	Authors	Age	Type locality	Country	Notes	Images
Chlorocebus ngedere	Sp. nov		Arenson et al.	Early Pleistocene	Lower Ngaloba Beds	Tanzania	A guenon	
Khoratpithecus magnus	Sp. nov	In press	Chaimanee et al.	Late Miocene		Thailand		
Sawecolobus	Gen. et sp. nov	Valid	Gommery et al.	Late Miocene	Lukeino Formation	Kenya	An Old World monkey belonging to the subfamily Colobinae. The type species is S. lukeinoensis.	

==== Primate research ====
- A study on the talar and calcaneal morphology in Eocene primates from the Vastan lignite mine (Gujarat, India), and on its implications for the knowledge of the locomotor capabilities of these primates, is published by Llera Martín, Rose & Sylvester (2022).
- A study on chipping patterns across the dentition of members of the genus Archaeolemur is published by Towle et al. (2022), who interpret their findings as indicating that members of this genus had a varied omnivorous diet and used their anterior teeth for extensive food processing.
- A study on the phylogenetic relationships of extant and fossil New World monkeys is published by Beck et al. (2022).
- A study on the internal nasal anatomy of Homunculus patagonicus, and on its implications for the knowledge of the phylogenetic affinities of this monkey, is published by Lundeen & Kay (2022).
- A study on the dental capabilities and potential dietary adaptations of Dolichopithecus ruscinensis is published by Plastiras et al. (2022), who interpret their findings as indicative of a more opportunistic feeding behavior for Dolichopithecus than characteristic of most extant colobines.
- Brasil et al. (2022) and Taylor et al. (2022) describe new assemblages of fossils of late Pleistocene Old World monkeys from the Middle Awash (Ethiopia), including fossils of the hamadryas baboons falling within the range of morphological variation observed for extant members of this species, fossils of black-and-white colobuses with morphologies intermediate between Middle Pleistocene samples from the Asbole site and modern mantled guereza and members or relatives of the genus Chlorocebus which might be ancestral to the monkeys currently living in the Afar region of Ethiopia.
- A study on the phylogenetic relationships for Middle-Late Miocene fossil apes is published by Pugh (2022).
- Rossie & Cote (2022) describe new fossil material of apes from the Miocene Lothidok Formation (Kenya), including a new mandible and an isolated molar of Turkanapithecus kalakolensis, expanding the knowledge of the lower molar morphology of the species; a new mandible of Simiolus enjiessi; and a new male specimen of Afropithecus turkanensis with unusual premolar morphology.
- Description of new fossil material of apes from the Miocene locality of Berg Aukas (Namibia) and new information on the locality of the ape mandible from the Miocene of Niger described by Pickford et al. (2008) is published by Mocke et al. (2022), who evaluate the implications of these fossils for the knowledge of the evolution of the African apes.
- A study on the anatomy and affinities of Yuanmoupithecus xiaoyuan is published by Ji et al. (2022), who interpret Y. xiaoyuan as a close relative of extant gibbons, and reinterpret Kapi ramnagarensis as a pliopithecoid.
- A study on the occurrence and morphology of calcar femorale in extant and fossil hominids is published by Cazenave et al. (2022), who interpret their findings as indicating that this structure cannot be considered as a diagnostic feature of habitual bipedal locomotion.
- Dental remains of Gigantopithecus blacki, possibly belonging to one of the latest relict populations of Gigantopithecus, are described from the Upper Pleistocene deposits of the Lang Trang cave (Vietnam) by Lopatin, Maschenko & Dac (2022).
- A study on the paleoecology of fossil pongines, with a focus on Khoratpithecus ayeyarwadyensis is published by Habinger et al. (2022), who interpret the habitat of K. ayeyarwadyensis to be overall similar to that of modern orangutans, but with foraging at different levels in the canopy.
- A study on the locomotor behaviour of Sahelanthropus tchadensis, based on data from a femur and two ulnae from the Miocene of the Toros-Ménalla fossiliferous area (Chad), is published by Daver et al. (2022), who interpret the morphology of the femur as likely indicative of habitual bipedality, and the morphology of the ulnae as preserving evidence of substantial arboreal behaviour.
- Atypical tooth wear, similar to tooth wear previously reported in fossil hominins and regarded as possible evidence of early cultural habits, is reported in a sample of extant Japanese macaques from Koshima Island by Towle et al. (2022), who interpret the atypical wear patterns as likely caused by accidental ingestion of sand and oral processing of marine mollusks, and evaluate the implications of this finding for interpretations of similar wear in fossil hominins.
- A review aiming to determine the value of extant primates as models for reconstructions of fossil hominin stone tool culture is published by Bandini, Harrison & Motes-Rodrigo (2022).

==== General paleoanthropology ====
- Monson et al. (2022) present evidence indicative of an increase in prenatal growth rates of hominids over the last 6 million years, with significant increases aligning with major evolutionary changes (adaptation to bipedality, increase of brain size associated with the evolution of genus Homo, the evolution of Homo erectus), and with prenatal growth rates more similar to humans than to other extant apes evolving in members of the genus Homo ~0.25–0.75 million years ago.
- A study on the evolution of modern human brain size during the Pliocene and Pleistocene, combining fourteen previous studies that document the evolution of brain size in gracile hominins in a consensus time series, is published by Gingerich (2022) who identifies four successive phases of evolutionary stasis and change.
- Revision of the age of major South African hominin sites, based on faunal correlations of Old World monkeys from African Plio-Pleistocene sites, is published by Frost et al. (2022), who interpret their findings as indicating that there are no hominin sites in South Africa significantly older than ~2.8 million years.
- Pickford et al. (2022) describe new fossil material of Orrorin praegens and Praeanthropus afarensis from the Pliocene Mabaget Formation (Kenya), and study the paleoenvironment of both species, reporting that O. praegens was found alongside a forest-adapted fauna, while geologically younger P. afarensis was found alongside an open woodland to savannah-like fauna.
- A study on the likely diet of members of the genus Paranthropus is published by Sponheimer et al. (2022).
- A study aiming to determine whether it is possible to identify distinct groups of Paranthropus robustus consistently with their provenience from the sites of Kromdraai, Drimolen and Swartkrans (South Africa), based on data from new fossil material of P. robustus from Kromdraai and Drimolen, is published by Braga et al. (2022).
- A study on the origins of the complex birth pattern characteristic of modern humans, based on data from simulations of the birth process in australopithecines, is published by Frémondière et al. (2022).
- A study on the mechanical strength of the feeding apparatus of australopiths is published by Ledogar et al. (2022), who interpret their findings as indicating that the strength of gracile australopith crania overlaps substantially with that of chimpanzee crania, with some gracile australopith crania as strong as that of a robust australopith, and hypothesize that the evolution of cranial traits of australopiths that increased the efficiency of bite force production may have simultaneously weakened their face.
- A study on the habitat types at the Woranso-Mille site (Ethiopia) during the Pliocene, and on factors which allowed the coexistence of more than one species of Australopithecus at the site, is published by Denise Su & Yohannes Haile-Selassie (2022).
- A study on the morphology and affinities of two 3.7-million-year-old hominin mandibles from Woranso-Mille is published by Yohannes Haile-Selassie et al. (2022), who report that the studied mandibles show morphological similarities with both Australopithecus anamensis and Australopithecus afarensis, and interpret their age and morphology as lending support to the hypothesized ancestor–descendant relationship between the two species.
- A study comparing the distal portion of the fibula of Australopithecus afarensis and extant humans and apes, aiming to determine the correlates of distal fibular shape with arboreal behavior in extant hominids and fossil hominins is published by Marchi et al. (2022).
- A study on the age of the Australopithecus fossils from the richest hominin-bearing deposit (Member 4) at Sterkfontein (South Africa) is published by Granger et al. (2022), who interpret their findings as placing nearly the entire Australopithecus assemblage at Sterkfontein in the mid-Pliocene, contemporaneous with Australopithecus afarensis in East Africa.
- A calcaneus of an early hominin, with a morphology that is intermediate between humans and nonhuman apes, is described from the Kromdraai fossil site (South Africa) by Harper et al. (2022).
- Zanolli et al. (2022) revise the dental fossil record of hominins the southern African sites of Sterkfontein, Swartkrans, Drimolen and Kromdraai B, and interpret their findings as indicative of a paucity of Homo remains and of increased levels of dental variation in australopith taxa, with some specimens of unclear generic status approximating the Homo condition in terms of overall enamel–dentine junction shape but retaining Australopithecus-like dental traits.
- A study on the impact of climate variability on the evolution of early African Homo, Eurasian Homo erectus, Homo heidelbergensis, Neanderthals and modern humans is published by Timmermann et al. (2022).
- A study on tooth marks on bones recovered from the Early Pleistocene David's Site (Bed I, Olduvai Gorge, Tanzania) is published by Cobo-Sánchez et al. (2022), who interpret their findings as indicating that early humans from David's Site had mostly primary access to fleshed carcasses prior to any other carnivore, with hyenas intervening after the deposition of carcass remains.
- A vertebra of a juvenile hominin is described from the early Pleistocene site of 'Ubeidiya (Israel) by Barash et al. (2022), who estimate the adult size of this hominin as comparable to early Pleistocene large-bodied hominins from Africa, and interpret this finding as the earliest large-bodied hominin remains from the Levantine corridor reported to date, distinct from other early Eurasian hominins, sharing affinities to East African large-bodied hominins, and supporting the occurrence of several Pleistocene dispersals of hominins out of Africa.
- A study on the 2.6 to 1.2 million years old zooarchaeological record of eastern Africa, aiming to determine whether the zooarchaeological record preserves sustained increase in the amount of evidence for hominin carnivory after the appearance of Homo erectus, is published by Barr et al. (2022).
- A study on the lesions of Dmanisi skull D2280 is published by Margvelashvili et al. (2022), who interpret the studied pathologies as evidence of blunt force trauma possibly caused by interpersonal violence, as well as evidence of treponemal disease.
- A study on fish remains from the early Middle Pleistocene (~780,000-years-old) site of Gesher Benot Ya'aqov (Israel) is published by Zohar et al. (2022), who interpret their findings as indicating that hominins from this site cooked fish before consumption, representing the earliest evidence of cooking by hominins reported to date.
- Evidence from the Zhoukoudian Locality 1 interpreted as indicative of controlled use of fire by Peking Man is presented by Huang, Li & Gao (2022).
- Description of the cochlear morphology of two individuals of Homo erectus from the Indonesian site Sangiran (Sangiran 2 and 4), comparing them with a sample australopiths and Middle to Late Pleistocene and extant humans, is published by Urciuoli et al. (2022).
- A study on the dispersal of Homo erectus in Southeast Asia is published by Husson et al. (2022), who determine H. erectus from the Sangiran site to be approximately 1.8-million-years-old, argue that the appearance of H. erectus in Java marks the onset of continental conditions there rather than the timing of their migration across Southeast Asia, and consider early H. erectus peopling Sundaland to be contemporary with their Chinese and Georgian counterparts.
- A study on the morphological variability among Middle Pleistocene Chinese hominins, aiming to determine the evolutionary processes that shaped hominin variation in eastern Eurasia during the Middle Pleistocene, is published by Liu et al. (2022).
- A study on the external and internal tooth structure in Homo luzonensis, and on its implications for the knowledge of the affinities of this species, is published by Zanolli et al. (2022).
- The first reconstruction of a fairly complete hominin posterior cranium from the late Middle Pleistocene Xujiayao site (China), and a study on the endocranial capacity of this cranium, is published by Wu et al. (2022), who interpret this specimen as the earliest evidence of a brain size that falls in the upper range of Neanderthals and modern Homo sapiens, and evaluate its implications for the knowledge of the evolution of the hominin brain size.
- A study on the Late Pleistocene human population dynamics, aiming to determine how the process of the replacement of Eurasian archaic humans by anatomically modern human populations dispersing from Africa unfolded, is published by Vahdati et al. (2022).
- A study on the development of teeth in Pleistocene hominins from the Gran Dolina and the Sima de los Huesos sites of the Sierra de Atapuerca (Spain) is published by Modesto-Mata et al. (2022).
- A study on the taphonomic features of the hominin skull remains from the Sima de los Huesos sample, aiming to create a catalog of modifications to crania and mandibles (including antemortem, perimortem and postmortem skeletal disturbances) within this sample, is published by Sala et al. (2022).
- A study aiming to determine the degree to which cranial variation seen in the fossil record of late Pleistocene hominins from Western Eurasia corresponds with the genetic data indicative of hybridization between distinct hominin lineages is published by Harvati & Ackermann (2022), who identify individual fossils as possibly admixed, and suggest that different cranial regions may preserve hybridization signals differentially.
- A hominin molar which might belong to a Denisovan is described from the Tam Ngu Hao 2 limestone cave in the Annamite Mountains (Laos) by Demeter et al. (2022).
- A study on the impact of the sexual dimorphism, ancestry and lifestyle effects on lordosis in a large sample of modern humans and Neanderthals is published by Williams et al. (2022), who interpret their findings as casting doubt on proposed locomotor and postural differences between modern humans and Neanderthals based on inferred lumbar lordosis (or lack thereof), and indicating that future studies should not compare remains of fossil hominins and preindustrial modern humans to samples from sedentary, industrialized populations, but rather to the remains of individuals that engaged in more active, traditional lifestyles.
- Putative Neanderthal footprints from Matalascañas (Province of Huelva, Spain), initially considered to be approximately 106,000 years old, are reinterpreted as Middle Pleistocene in age (dating to the MIS 9-MIS 8 transition) by Mayoral et al. (2022).
- Four teeth of Neanderthals, belonging to at least two individuals (an adult and a child) and representing the earliest evidence of Neanderthal spread into the Eastern Mediterranean Area reported to date, are described from the Chibanian of the Velika Balanica cave (Serbia) by Roksandic et al. (2022).
- Andreeva et al. (2022) present mitochondrial DNA and genome sequencing results from the study of a tooth of a Neanderthal woman from the Mezmaiskaya cave (Adygea, Russia), and interpret their findings as indicating that the studied individual was more closely related to Neanderthals from the Mezmaiskaya cave and from the Stajnia cave (Poland) associated with the Eastern Micoquien context than with Western European Neanderthals associated with other Middle Paleolithic cultural facies, and that the studied individual was the last member of the early Neanderthal branches which were replaced by genetically distant late Neanderthal populations 60–40 thousand years ago.
- Skov et al. (2022) present genetic data for 13 Neanderthals from two Middle Palaeolithic sites (Chagyrskaya Cave and Okladnikov Cave) in the Altai Mountains of southern Siberia (Russia), and interpret their findings as indicating that some Chagyrskaya individuals were closely related (including a father–daughter pair) and that the Chagyrskaya Neanderthals were part of a small community.
- Evidence from zinc isotope analysis of tooth enamel of a Neanderthal individual from the cave site Cueva de los Moros 1 (Gabasa, Pyrenees, Spain), interpreted as supporting the interpretation of Neanderthals as carnivores, is presented by Jaouen et al. (2022).
- A study on the impact of climatic effects on ecosystem productivity during the Middle to Upper Palaeolithic transition in the Iberian Peninsula is published by Vidal-Cordasco et al. (2022), who interpret their findings as providing evidence of the impact of Marine Isotope Stage 3 stadial–interstadial cycles on ecosystem productivity, as well as indicative of coincidence of changes of net primary productivity with the spatial and temporal replacement patterns of Neanderthals by modern humans in Iberia, and indicating that Neanderthals survived longer in the areas where changes of ecosystem productivity were small.
- A study on the impact of the single amino acid change in TKTL1 differentiating modern humans from extinct archaic humans and other primates on neocortex development is published by Pinson et al. (2022), who consider it likely that this change was responsible for greater neocortical neurogenesis in modern humans than in Neanderthals.
- Foerster et al. (2022) present a 620,000-year environmental record from Chew Bahir (Ethiopia), providing evidence of three distinct phases of climate variability in eastern Africa which coincided with shifts in hominin evolution and dispersal.
- A study on the age of the Omo remains is published by Vidal et al. (2022).
- A study on the anatomy of the brain, braincase and bony labyrinth of the Border Cave 1 cranium is published by Beaudet et al. (2022).
- A study on the endocranial development in early Homo sapiens, based on data from fossil material of child and adult individuals from Herto (Ethiopia), Skhul and Qafzeh (Israel), is published by Zollikofer et al. (2022), who interpret their findings as indicating that brain growth dynamics of Pleistocene H. sapiens might have had more in common with Neanderthals than with modern H. sapiens, as well as indicating that the brains of fossil and modern H. sapiens were probably structurally similar, and that the differences of shape of braincases between fossil and modern adult individuals of H. sapiens were not caused by different brain anatomy, and were more likely caused by factors such as effects of shift to softer diets and/or reduced metabolic demands on craniofacial size and shape.
- Reconstruction of the eastern African environments inhabited by early human populations during the Middle Stone Age, evaluating the role of shifting environmental conditions on the distribution and variability of dated Middle Stone Age assemblages, is published by Timbrell et al. (2022).
- Evidence of four periods of human occupation between c. 210,000 and 120,000 years ago is reported from Jebel Faya (United Arab Emirates) by Bretzke et al. (2022), who evaluate the implications of these findings for the knowledge of the impact of arid conditions on Paleolithic human populations in Arabia.
- A study on the range of hunter-gatherer presence across Central Africa over the past 120,000 years, inferred from paleoclimatic reconstructions and archaeological sites, is published by Padilla-Iglesias et al. (2022).
- Possible evidence of use of fruits and wood from olive trees by the early Homo sapiens around 100,000 years ago is reported from Morocco by Marquer et al. (2022).
- Evidence of the production of ostrich eggshell artefacts, long-distance transportation of marine molluscs and systematic use of heat shatter in stone tool production approximately 92–80 thousand years before the present is reported from the Varsche Rivier 003 site (South Africa) by Mackay et al. (2022), who evaluate the implications of these findings for the knowledge of the processes of innovation and cultural transmission in southern Africa during the Middle Stone Age.
- Hominin fossils interpreted as evidence of the earliest known arrival of modern humans in Europe (between 56,800 and 51,700 calibrated years before the present) are described from the Mandrin Cave (France) by Slimak et al. (2022).
- A study on the microstructure and likely origin of the material used to produce the Venus of Willendorf is published by Weber et al. (2022).
- The earliest ochre-processing feature in Eastern Asia reported to date, a bone tool and a distinctive miniaturized lithic assemblage with bladelet-like tools bearing traces of hafting, representing a cultural assembly of traits that is unique for Eastern Asia, is described from the approximately 40,000-year-old Xiamabei site (China) by Wang et al. (2022).
- Maloney et al. (2022) report the discovery of remains of a young individual from the Liang Tebo cave (East Kalimantan, Indonesia) living at least 31,000 years ago, interpreted as surviving the surgical amputation of part of their leg and living for another 6–9 years.
- Zhang et al. (2022) sequence the genome of a Late Pleistocene hominin from Red Deer Cave (Yunnan, China), and interpret hominins from Red Deer Cave as members of an early diversified lineage of anatomically modern humans in East Asia with a link to the ancestry that contributed to First Americans.
- A study on patterns in the stratigraphic integrity of early North American archeological sites, and on their implications for the knowledge of the timing of human arrival to North America, is published by Surovell et al. (2022).
- Rowe et al. (2022) study the bone assemblage from the Hartley mammoth locality (Colorado, United States) dating to 38,900–36,250 calibrated years before the present, and interpret this assemblage as a butchery site.
- Davis et al. (2022) report the discovery of an assemblage of stemmed projectile points from Cooper's Ferry site (Idaho, United States), dating to ~16,000 years ago and predating stemmed points found previously at the site (as well as Clovis fluted points), and note the similarity of the studied projectile points with projectiles from late Upper Paleolithic sites in Hokkaido (Japan).
- A study on the authenticity of the potential Ice Age rock art of Serranía de la Lindosa (Colombia) is published by Iriarte et al. (2022), who argue that there are sound grounds to consider the studied paintings as ancient and likely representing now-extinct Ice Age megafauna.
- Lipson et al. (2022) present new genome-wide ancient DNA data from three Late Pleistocene and three early to middle Holocene individuals associated with Late Stone Age technologies from Kisese II and Mlambalasi Rockshelters in Tanzania, Fingira and Hora 1 Rockshelters in Malawi and Kalemba Rockshelter in Zambia, and study changes in regional- and continental-scale population structures in sub-Saharan Africa during the Late Pleistocene and early Holocene.
- Computational biologists report the largest detailed human genetic genealogy, unifying human genomes from many sources for insights about human history, ancestry and evolution. It demonstrates a novel computational method for estimating how human DNA is related, in specific as a series of 13 million linked trees along the genome, a tree-sequence, which has also been called "the largest human family tree".
- Geneticists report that the fastest-evolved regions of the human genome, they call HAQERs, "rapidly diverged in an episodic burst" of positive selection prior to the human-Neanderthal split and identify over 1,500 such HAQERs that substantially distinguish humans from related other apes via datasets such as of HARs and experiments that use embryonic mouse brains.

=== Rodentia ===
Name	Novelty	Status	Authors	Age	Type locality	Country	Notes	Images
Cedromus modicus	Sp. nov	Valid	Korth et al.	Chadronian-Orellan	Brule Formation	United States (Nebraska)	A member of the family Sciuridae.	
Costepeiromys	Gen. et sp. nov	Valid	Korth et al.	Chadronian-Orellan	Chadron Formation	United States (Nebraska)	A member of the family Aplodontiidae belonging to the subfamily Prosciurinae. The type species is C. attasorus.	
Debruijnia tintinnabulus	Sp. nov	In press	De Bruijn et al.	Late Eocene		Serbia	A member of the family Spalacidae.	
Eoelfomys	Gen. et sp. nov	In press	Vianey-Liaud & Hautier	Eocene		France	A member of Theridomyoidea. The type species is E. lapradensis.	
Eumyarion aegeaniensis	Sp. nov	In press	Bilgin et al.	Early Miocene		Turkey		
Eumyarion beyderensis	Sp. nov	In press	Bilgin et al.	Early Miocene		Turkey		
Heosminthus teredens	Sp. nov	Valid	Calede, Tse & Cairns	Arikareean		United States (Montana)	A member of the family Sminthidae.	
Homœtreposciurus	Gen. et sp. nov	In press	Vianey-Liaud & Hautier	Eocene		Switzerland	A member of Theridomyoidea. The type species is H. egerkingensis.	
Hydrochoerus hesperotiganites	Sp. nov	Valid	White et al.	Late Pleistocene		United States (California)	A species of Capybara.	
Hystrix velunensis	Sp. nov	Valid	Czernielewski	Pliocene		Poland	A species of Hystrix. Announced in 2022; the final article version was published in 2023.	
Ischyromys brevidens	Sp. nov	Valid	Korth et al.	Chadronian-Orellan	Chadron Formation	United States (Nebraska)		
Jebelus	Gen. et sp. nov	Valid	Kraatz	Miocene	Baynunah Formation	United Arab Emirates	A member of the subfamily Gerbillinae. The type species is J. rex.	
Kanisamys kutchensis	Sp. nov	Valid	Patnaik et al.	Late Miocene		India	A rhizomyine.	
Keramidomys sibiricus	Sp. nov	Valid	Daxner-Höck et al.	Miocene	Tagay Formation	Russia (Irkutsk Oblast)	A member of the family Eomyidae.	
Kirkomys miriamae	Sp. nov	Valid	Korth et al.	Chadronian	Chadron Formation	United States (Nebraska)	A member of the family Florentiamyidae.	
Litoyoderimys grossus	Sp. nov	Valid	Korth et al.	Chadronian-Orellan	Chadron Formation	United States (Nebraska)	A member of the family Eomyidae.	
Manchenomys	Gen. et sp. et comb. nov	Valid	Agustí et al.	Early Pleistocene	Baza Formation	Spain	A member of Arvicolidae. The type species is M. orcensis; genus also includes "Mimomys" oswaldoreigi Agustí, Castillo & Galobart (1993).	
Masillamys cosensis	Sp. nov	Valid	Vianey-Liaud et al.	Eocene (Lutetian)		France	A member of Theridomorpha belonging to the family Masillamyidae.	
Megacricetodon grueneri	Sp. nov	Valid	Čermák, Oliver & Fejfar	Miocene		Czech Republic	A member of the family Cricetidae.	
Microtheriomys articulaquaticus	Sp. nov		Calede	Arikareean	Renova Formation	United States (Montana)	A member of the family Castoridae belonging to the subfamily Anchitheriomyinae.	
Microtus nivaloides lidiae	Ssp. nov	Valid	Markova & Borodin	Middle Pleistocene		Russia	A vole belonging to the genus Microtus.	
Mus kerati	Sp. nov	Valid	Stoetzel & Pickford	Middle Pleistocene		Algeria	A species of Mus.	
Myocricetodon gujaratensis	Sp. nov	Valid	Patnaik et al.	Late Miocene		India	A gerbilline.	
Paradjidaumo patriciae	Sp. nov	Valid	Korth et al.	Chadronian-Orellan	Chadron Formation	United States (Nebraska)	A member of the family Eomyidae.	
Paraethomys geraadsi	Sp. nov	Valid	Stoetzel & Pickford	Middle Pleistocene		Algeria	A member of the family Muridae belonging to the subfamily Murinae.	
Pararhizomys parvulus	Sp. nov	Valid	Wang	Miocene	Probably Liushu Formation	China	A member of the family Spalacidae belonging to the subfamily Tachyoryctoidinae and the tribe Pararhizomyini.	
Progonomys prasadi	Sp. nov	Valid	Patnaik et al.	Late Miocene		India	A murine.	
Protansomys	Gen. et sp. nov	Valid	Korth et al.	Chadronian-Orellan	Chadron Formation	United States (Nebraska)	A member of the family Aplodontiidae belonging to the subfamily Ansomyinae. The type species is P. gulottai.	
Shapajamys minor	Sp. nov	Valid	Arnal et al.	Paleogene	Santa Rosa fossil site	Peru	A caviomorph rodent.	
Sinotamias lungui	Sp. nov	Valid	Sinitsa & Delinschi	Late Miocene		Moldova; Ukraine	A ground squirrel.	
Sinotamias topachevskyi	Sp. nov	Valid	Sinitsa & Delinschi	Late Miocene		Moldova; Ukraine	A ground squirrel.	
Siouxlindrodon	Gen. et sp. nov	Valid	Korth et al.	Chadronian	Chadron Formation	United States (Nebraska)	A member of the family Cylindrodontidae. The type species is S. sullivani.	
Spermophilinus debruijni	Sp. nov	Valid	Daxner-Höck et al.	Miocene	Tagay Formation	Russia (Irkutsk Oblast)	A member of the family Sciuridae belonging to the subfamily Sciurinae.	
Tamias gilaharee	Sp. nov	Valid	Patnaik et al.	Late Miocene		India	A species of Tamias.	
Tobienia fejfari	Sp. nov	Valid	Tesakov & Bondarev	Late Pliocene		Russia	A member of the tribe Lemmini.	
Ucayalimys amahuacensis	Sp. nov	Valid	Arnal et al.	Paleogene	Santa Rosa fossil site	Peru	A caviomorph rodent, possibly a member of Chinchilloidea.	
Vucetichimys	Gen. et sp. nov	Valid	Arnal et al.	Paleogene	Santa Rosa fossil site	Peru	A caviomorph rodent. The type species is V. pretrilophodoncia.	
Yoderimys massarae	Sp. nov	Valid	Korth et al.	Chadronian	Chadron Formation	United States (Nebraska)	A member of the family Eomyidae.	

==== Rodent research ====
- A study on the fossil record of rodents from the early Eocene to the early Oligocene in Central, East and South Asia is published by Li et al. (2022), who interpret the studied fossil material as indicative of faunal turnover of rodents in East Asia which was affected by paleoclimatic changes, as well as suggestive of faunal exchanges between South Asia and Africa during the Sharamurunian and Ergilian.
- A well-preserved skull of Miopetaurista crusafonti, with the cranial morphology almost identical to extant large flying squirrels but with the encephalization quotient lower than observed in extant flying squirrels, is described from the Miocene of Bavaria (Germany) by Grau-Camats et al. (2022).
- New estimates of body mass of extinct giant rodents, including estimates for Josephoartigasia monesi and Phoberomys pattersoni which are much lower than in previous studies, are presented by Engelman (2022).
- Pessoa-Lima et al. (2022) compare the morphological features and chemical composition of tooth enamel of Neoepiblema and extant capybara.
- Description of new fossil material of Hystrix makapanensis from Olduvai Gorge (Tanzania) and a review of the African record of this species is published by Azzarà et al. (2022).
- The first description of the postcranial remains of Bathyergoides neotertiarius from the Miocene of Namibia is published by Bento Da Costa & Senut (2022), who evaluate the implications of the studied fossils for the knowledge of the behaviour of this rodent.
- Description of new fossil material and a study on the taxonomic diversity of dinomyids from the late Miocene-early Pliocene Cerro Azul Formation (Argentina) is published by Sostillo et al. (2022).
- A study on the validity of the genus Gyriabrus, and a revision of the species assigned to this genus, is published by Rasia (2022).
- Revision of the fossil material assigned to members of the genus Cephalomyopsis, as well as a taxonomic revision of this genus, is published by Busker (2022).
- Description of cavioid, chinchilloid and erethizontoid rodents from the Miocene Pampa Castillo fauna (Chile) and a study on their biochronologic and paleoenvironmental implications is published by McGrath et al. (2022).
- A study on the enamel microstructure of lower incisors of eomyids is published by Kalthoff et al. (2022), who interpret the incisor enamel microstructure of these rodents as supporting their phylogenetic placement outside Geomorpha.
- Lechner & Böhme (2022) describe new fossil material of Steneofiber depereti from the Miocene Hammerschmiede clay pit (Germany), who interpret the studied material as representing a morphologically intermediate stage between S. depereti and Chalicomys jaegeri, and interpret the tooth wear stages of the studied premolars from Hammerschmiede as indicative of similarities in demography and ecology, including similar habitat requirements, between S. depereti and extant beavers.
- Mörs et al. (2022) describe fossil material of Euroxenomys minutus from the Miocene of the Tagay locality (Olkhon Island, Irkutsk Oblast, Russia), representing the first known record of this species from Asia and the northernmost record of Eurasian Miocene beavers reported to date.
- A study on the phylogenetic relationships of Paronychomys and Basirepomys is published by Kelly & Martin (2022).
- A study on the anatomy of the skull of Hispanomys moralesi is published by Carro-Rodríguez et al. (2022).
- Description of the anatomy of the holotype specimen of the Tenerife giant rat is published by Casanovas-Vilar & Luján (2022).

=== Other euarchontoglires ===
Name	Novelty	Status	Authors	Age	Type locality	Country	Notes	Images
Bohlinotona mongolica	Sp. nov	Valid	Erbajeva, Flynn & Daxner-Höck	Late Oligocene	Hsanda Gol Formation	Mongolia	A member of the family Ochotonidae belonging to the subfamily Sinolagomyinae.	
Pronolagus humpatensis	Sp. nov	Valid	Sen & Pickford	Early Pleistocene		Angola	A red rock hare.	

==== Other euarchontoglire research ====
- A study on the cranial traits of extant and extinct lagomorphs is published by Wood-Bailey, Cox & Sharp (2022), who argue that the last common ancestor of living leporids likely had an intracranial joint and some form of facial tilt, while these features were likely absent in the last common ancestor of all lagomorphs.
- A study on the evolution of the lower fourth premolars and lower second molars in microsyopine plesiadapiforms from the early Eocene of the Bighorn Basin (Wyoming, United States) is published by Selig & Silcox (2022), who report that the studied premolars became increasingly more similar to molars through time, but do not observe any associated change of the molars.

== Laurasiatherians ==
=== Artiodactyla ===
Name	Novelty	Status	Authors	Age	Type locality	Country	Notes	Images
Afrotragulus akhtari	Sp. nov	Valid	Sánchez et al.	Miocene		Pakistan	A chevrotain.	
Afrotragulus megalomilos	Sp. nov	Valid	Sánchez et al.	Miocene		Pakistan	A chevrotain.	
Afrotragulus moralesi	Sp. nov	Valid	Sánchez et al.	Miocene		Pakistan	A chevrotain.	
Angelocetus	Gen. et sp. nov	Valid	Peri et al.	Miocene (Burdigalian)		Italy	A toothed whale belonging to the group Physeteroidea. The type species is A. cursiensis.	
Antaecetus	Gen. et comb. nov	Valid	Gingerich, Amane & Zouhri	Eocene (Bartonian)	Aridal Formation	Morocco	A basilosaurid cetacean. The type species is "Platyosphys" aithai Gingerich & Zouhri (2015).	
Archaebalaenoptera eusebioi	Sp. nov	Valid	Bisconti et al.	Miocene (Tortonian)	Pisco Formation	Peru	A rorqual.	
Discokeryx	Gen. et sp. nov		Wang et al.	Early Miocene	Halamagai Formation	China	A member of Giraffoidea belonging to the family Prolibytheriidae. The type species is D. xiezhi.	
Ebusia	Gen. et sp. nov	Valid	Moyà-Solà, Quintana Cardona & Köhler	Probably Neogene		Spain	A caprine bovid. The type species is E. moralesi.	
Hemiauchenia mirim	Sp. nov	Valid	Greco et al.	Late Pleistocene		Brazil	A camelid.	
Jobancetus	Gen. et sp. nov	Valid	Kimura, Hasegawa & Suzuki	Miocene (Burdigalian)	Minamishirado Formation	Japan	A baleen whale of uncertain affinities. Genus includes new species J. pacificus. Published online in 2022, but the issue date is listed as January 2023.	
Kaaucetus	Gen. et sp. nov	Valid	Hernández-Cisneros	Late Oligocene	El Cien Formation	Mexico	An aetiocetid cetacean. Genus includes new species K. thesaurus.	
Libytherium proton	Sp. nov	Valid	Ríos et al.	Miocene	Chinji Formation	Pakistan	A member of the family Giraffidae belonging to the subfamily Sivatheriinae.	
Linxiatragus	Gen. et sp. nov		Wang et al.	Miocene	Linxia Basin	China	An antelope belonging to the tribe Nesotragini. The type species is L. dengi.	
Listriodon dukkar	Sp. nov	Valid	Van der Made et al.	Late Miocene		India	A member of the family Suidae belonging to the subfamily Listriodontinae.	
Miophyseter	Gen. et sp. nov	Valid	Kimura & Hasegawa	Miocene (Burdigalian)	Toyohama Formation	Japan	A Physeteroidea sperm whale. Type species M. chitaensis.	
Neochorlakkia	Gen. et sp. nov	Valid	Ducrocq et al.	Eocene	Pondaung Formation	Myanmar	A member of the family Dichobunidae. The type species is N. myaingensis.	
Persufflatius	Gen. et sp. nov	Valid	Bosselaers & Munsterman	Miocene (Tortonian)	Diessen Formation	Netherlands	A baleen whale belonging to the group Balaenomorpha. The type species is P. renefraaijeni.	
Propotamochoerus aegaeus	Sp. nov	Valid	Lazaridis, Tsoukala & Kostopoulos	Miocene (Turolian)		Bulgaria; Greece; North Macedonia; Italy? Turkey?	A member of the family Suidae belonging to the subfamily Suinae and the tribe Dicoryphochoerini.	
Rododelphis	Gen. et sp. nov	Valid	Bianucci et al.	Early Pleistocene	Lindos Formation	Greece	An oceanic dolphin belonging to the subfamily Globicephalinae. Type species is R. stamatiadisi.	
Rusingameryx	Gen. et comb. nov	Disputed	Pickford	Miocene	Hiwegi Formation	Kenya; Namibia; Uganda	An anthracothere. The type species is "Brachyodus" aequatorialis MacInnes (1951). Tsubamoto et al. (2025) did not consider the erection of the separate genus for B. aequatorialis to be robustly supported, and conservatively used the genus Brachyodus for this species.	
Ua	Gen. et sp. nov	Preoccupied	Solounias, Smith & Rios Ibàñez	Miocene	Chinji Formation	Pakistan	A member of the family Giraffidae, possibly a relative of the okapi. The type species is U. pilbeami. The generic name is shared with the hymenopteran genus Ua Girault (1929).	

==== Artiodactyl research ====
- Revision of the systematics of the camelids belonging to the genera Gentilicamelus and Nothokemas is published by Marriott, Prothero & Beatty (2022).
- A study on the diet and habitat of specimens of Camelops hesternus, Hemiauchenia macrocephala and H. gracilis from two Pleistocene sites in west-central Mexico is published by Marín-Leyva et al. (2022).
- A study on the diet of Hemiauchenia paradoxa, guanaco and vicuña from the Pleistocene of southern Brazil is published by Carrasco et al. (2022).
- Description of camel remains from the Tsagaan Agui Cave and the Tugrug Shireet open-air site (Mongolia), including fossil material of Camelus knoblochi, is published by Klementiev et al. (2022), who interpret their findings as evidence of survival of C. knoblochi in the Gobi Desert until the Last Glacial Maximum.
- New fossil material of Miocene suids is described from the Siwaliks of Pakistan by Raza et al. (2022), providing new information on the diversification and evolution of suids from this area.
- A study on the relationship between functional occlusal traits, dental wear and increase in crown length in the third molars of Pliocene and Pleistocene African suids, aiming to determine the evolutionary trends of the functional occlusal traits in these suids in the context of their dietary ecology and potential selective pressures, is published by Yang et al. (2022).
- A study on the evolutionary history of ruminants, as inferred from their inner ear morphology, is published by Mennecart et al. (2022).
- Redescription of the first complete skull of Dorcatherium naui from the Miocene locality of Eppelsheim, comparing it with two new skulls from the late Miocene hominid locality Hammerschmiede (Germany), is published by Hartung & Böhme (2022), who interpret the studied fossils as indicative of significant sexual dimorphism on cranial features in D. naui.
- Review of the large-sized members of the genus Palaeotragus from the Vallesian of northern Greece, and a systematic revision of large-sized Late Miocene Eurasian members of the genus Palaeotragus, is published by Laskos & Kostopoulos (2022).
- Ríos et al. (2022) describe a new partial skull of Decennatherium rex from the Miocene site Batallones-10 (Madrid Basin, Spain), providing new information on the variability of the cranial appendages in this species.
- New fossil material of a member of the genus Acteocemas belonging or related to the species A. infans, providing evidence that protoantlers of Acteocemas were able to be cast and re-grown (but also indicating that the lifespan of these protoantlers could be longer than that of antlers of modern deer, preventing them from assuming a similar cycle), is described from the Miocene site of Sant Andreu de la Barca (Spain) by Azanza et al. (2022).
- A study on the biogeographic history of deer belonging to the subfamilies Cervinae and Capreolinae is published by Croitor (2022).
- New antler remains are described from the Upper Siwaliks in Pakistan by Croitor et al. (2022), who interpret the antler material as indicative of the presence of six cervid forms in the Upper Siwaliks, including the earliest paleontological record of the lineage of Panolia reported to date.
- A study on the histology of ribs of Candiacervus, and on its implications for the knowledge of the longevity of this deer, is published by Miszkiewicz & Van Der Geer (2022).
- A study aiming to reconstruct the body mass of the individual species belonging to the genus Candiacervus is published by Besiou et al. (2022).
- A study on the mechanical performances of the mandible of Sinomegaceros pachyosteus is published by Fu et al. (2022), who interpret this cervid as a likely grazer with a diet similar to those of horses or buffaloes.
- Evidence from the strontium isotope analysis of the tooth enamel of the Irish elk, interpreted as consistent with the presence of seasonal mobility in the specimen from Ballybetagh (Dublin, Ireland), is presented by Douw et al. (2022), who argue that the mobility of the Ballybetagh specimen might have been a response to the climatic deterioration of the Younger Dryas.
- A study on the evolutionary history of the Siberian roe deer, as indicated by data from four ancient mitochondrial genomes generated from roe deer fossil specimens from northeastern China, is published by Deng et al. (2022).
- A study on the evolutionary history of red deer in northern China, based on data from mitochondrial genomes of extant and late Pleistocene deer, is published by Xiao et al. (2022).
- Exceptionally preserved fossil material of "Pseudodama" nestii, providing new information on the anatomy and affinities of this cervid, is described from the Early Pleistocene locality of Pantalla (Italy) by Cherin et al. (2022), who report evidence of anomalies in two male crania from the sample from Pantalla interpreted as likely result of different traumas during the life of these individuals, and interpret the age and sex structure of the population from this site as likely indicating that the Pantalla deer died during or immediately after the rutting season.
- Description of new fossil material of Qurliqnoria cheni from the northern Tibetan Plateau, providing new information on the anatomy of this bovid, is published by Tseng et al. (2022), who evaluate the implications of this finding for the knowledge of the evolution of the Tibetan antelope.
- Redescription of Qurliqnoria hundesiensis, based on reexamination of the holotype and data from new fossil material, is published by Wang, Li & Tseng (2022), who consider it unlikely that the Pliocene Qurliqnoria was a direct ancestor of the Tibetan antelope.
- Vislobokova (2022) describes caprine fossil material from the Lower Pleistocene deposits of the Taurida Cave (Crimea), interpreted as fossil material of Soergelia minor and representing the first evidence of the presence of the genus Soergelia in Eastern Europe.
- Neto de Carvalho et al. (2022) describe large artiodactyl tracks from early Late Pleistocene sites in southwestern Spain, name a new ichnotaxon Bovinichnus uripeda, and interpret the studied tracks as produced by the aurochs, providing evidence of recurrent use of the coastal habitat by these bovids.
- The first complete skull of Bothriogenys fraasi from the Oligocene deposits of the Fayum Depression (Egypt) is described by Sileem & Abu El-Kheir (2022).
- A relatively complete cranium and mandible of Brachyodus onoideus, providing new information on the anatomy of this anthracothere, is described by Pickford & MacLaren (2022).
- Review of the systematics of the American anthracotheres is published by Prothero, Marriott & Welsh (2022).
- A study on the dental microwear and likely diet of Anthracotherium and Entelodon is published by Rivals et al. (2022), who interpret their findings as indicating that Entelodon had an omnivorous diet similar to that of the extant wild boar, while Anthracotherium was an opportunistic herbivore, with different individuals recovered as browsers, frugivores and grazers.
- A study comparing changes in the skull anatomy during the ontogeny in Hippopotamus gorgops and extant hippopotamus, based on data from the skull of a juvenile specimen of H. gorgops from the Early Pleistocene site of Buia (Eritrea), is published by Martínez-Navarro et al. (2022).
- A study on the functional morphology of the hindlimbs of the Cyprus dwarf hippopotamus is published by Georgitsis et al. (2022), who interpret their findings as indicative of specialized locomotion of this hippopotamus, resulting from modifications to its limbs influenced by the mountainous island environment and the body size reduction.
- A study aiming to reconstruct the drivers of shape variation, morphological diversity and evolutionary rate in the cetacean cranium throughout their evolutionary history is published by Coombs et al. (2022).
- A study on palates of living and fossil cetaceans and living terrestrial artiodactyls is published by Peredo, Pyenson & Uhem (2022), who interpret their findings as indicating that the presence of lateral palatal foramina alone cannot be used to infer the presence of baleen in mysticetes; their conclusions were subsequently contested by Ekdale et al. (2024) and the 2022 article was retracted in 2025, but Pyenson, Uhen & Peredo (2026) subsequently reached similar conclusions on the basis of analysis of data from 2022 and 2024 studies and from the fossil record.
- A study aiming to quantify light-activation metrics in rhodopsin pigments of cetaceans throughout their evolutionary history is published by Dungan & Chang (2022), who interpret their findings as indicating that some of the first fully aquatic cetaceans could dive into the mesopelagic zone, and that this behavior arose before the divergence of toothed and baleen whales.
- A study on the evolution of the skull in mosasaurids and early cetaceans during the first 20 million years of their evolutionary histories, testing for possible instances of ecomorphological convergence in the skulls and teeth between the groups, is published by Bennion et al. (2022).
- Chakraborty & Sengupta (2022) describe a nearly complete skull of Remingtonocetus harudiensis from the Eocene Harudi Formation (India), representing the largest skull of Remingtonocetus discovered to date, and providing new information on the skull morphology of this cetacean.
- Fossil material of a basilosaurid cetacean is described from the Eocene Beloglinskaya Formation (Krasnodar Krai, Russia) by Tarasenko (2022), representing the first record of a basilosaurid in the studied region.
- Redescription and a study on the phylogenetic affinities of Kekenodon onamata is published by Corrie & Fordyce (2022).
- A diverse assemblage of fossil cetaceans, preserving fossil of taxa which are characteristic of or unique to Oligocene deposits as well as taxa more typical of early or middle Miocene deposits, is described from the Oligocene-Miocene Belgrade Formation (North Carolina, United States) by Boessenecker (2022).
- A specimen of Xiphiacetus cristatus is described from the Miocene of Austria by Lambert et al. (2022), representing the first record of this species outside the North Atlantic proper, and the first unequivocal record of eurhinodelphinids from the Paratethys; Lambert et al. also study the anatomy of the bony labyrinth of X. cristatus, and interpret it as indicating that eurhinodelphinids likely employed narrow-band high-frequency echolocation.
- Description of a new specimen of an archaic dolphin (belonging or related to the species Prosqualodon davidis) from the Miocene Gee Greensand (New Zealand), and a study on the implications of this specimen for the knowledge of the evolution of the brain of toothed whales, is published by Tanaka, Ortega & Fordyce (2022).
- A study on the anatomy and phylogenetic affinities of Notocetus vanbenedeni is published by Viglino et al. (2022).
- Reappraisal of the systematics, phylogeny and feeding behavior of Orcinus citoniensis is published by Citron et al. (2022), who confirm the assignment of this species to the genus Orcinus.
- A study on tooth marks on physeteroid bones from the Miocene Pisco Formation (Peru) is published by Benites-Palomino et al. (2022), who interpret their findings as indicating that Miocene sharks were actively targeting the foreheads of physeteroids to feed on their lipid-rich nasal complexes, with the shape and distribution of the bite marks suggesting a series of consecutive scavenging events by members of different shark species.
- Revision of the Miocene cetacean assemblage from the Swiss Upper Marine Molasse is published by Aguirre-Fernández, Jost & Hilfiker (2022), who report hitherto unknown kentriodontid and squalodelphinid fossils from this assemblage.
- The second specimen of Casatia thermophila, providing new information on the anatomy of this monodontid, is described from the Pliocene locality of Arcille (Italy) by Merella et al. (2022).
- Review of the fundamental morphological transformations that occurred at the origin stage of the baleen whales is published by Bisconti & Carnevale (2022).
- A study on the evolution of the feeding strategies of members of the baleen whale clade Chaeomysticeti, as inferred from rostral morphologies of extant and fossil taxa, is published by Tanaka (2022), who argues that the feeding strategy of the earliest chaeomysticetes could be more similar to lunge feeding than to skim feeding, and that balaenids and the pygmy right whale shifted to skim feeding independently.
- Bisconti et al. (2022) describe a periotic of a basal rorqual from the Miocene (Tortonian) of Italy, argued to belong to an individual was longer than all the other contemporaneous rorquals, and interpreted as indicative of the early evolution of large body size in this family.
- A study on the evolution of feeding structures of baleen whales across the teeth-to-baleen transition is published by Gatesy et al. (2022), who name a new clade Kinetomenta containing the groups Aetiocetidae and Chaeomysticeti.

=== Carnivorans ===
Name	Novelty	Status	Authors	Age	Type locality	Country	Notes	Images
Adeilosmilus	Gen. et comb. nov	Valid	Jiangzuo, Werdelin & Sun	Miocene		Chad	A member of Machairodontinae; a new genus for "Machairodus" kabir Peigné et al. (2005).	
?Agriarctos nikolovi	Sp. nov	Valid	Jiangzuo & Spassov	Miocene (Messinian)	Lozenets Formation	Bulgaria	An ursid belonging to the subfamily Ailuropodinae and the tribe Ailuropodini.	
Aragonictis	Gen. et sp. nov	Valid	Valenciano et al.	Miocene		Spain	A small-sized mustelid. The type species is A. araid.	
Canis hewitti	Sp. nov	In press	Fourvel & Frerebeau	Pliocene-Pleistocene		South Africa	A Canina canine.	
Circamustela hartmanni	Sp. nov	Valid	Kargopoulos et al.	Miocene (Tortonian)		Germany	A mustelid belonging to the subfamily Guloninae.	
Enhydriodon omoensis	Sp. nov	Valid	Grohé, Uno & Boisserie	Plio-Pleistocene	Shungura Formation	Ethiopia	An otter.	
Hadrokirus novotini	Sp. nov	In press	Hafed et al.	Neogene		United States (North Carolina)	An earless seal belonging to the subfamily Monachinae.	
Homiphoca murfreesi	Sp. nov	In press	Hafed et al.	Neogene		United States (North Carolina)	An earless seal belonging to the subfamily Monachinae.	
Longchuansmilus	Gen. et sp. nov	Valid	Jiangzuo et al.	Late Miocene		China	A member of Machairodontinae. The type species is L. xingyongi.	
Lynx hei	Sp. nov	Valid	Jianzuo et al.	Early Pleistocene	Linxia Basin	China	A lynx.	
Mogharacyon	Gen. et comb. nov	Valid	Morales & Pickford	Early Miocene		Egypt	An amphicyonid; a new genus for "Cynelos" anubisi Morlo et al. (2019).	
Moralesictis	Gen. et sp. nov	Valid	Valenciano & Baskin	Hemphillian		United States (Texas)	A mellivorine mustelid. The type species is M. intrepidus.	
Namibiocyon	Gen. et comb. nov	Valid	Morales & Pickford	Early Miocene		Namibia	An amphicyonid; a new genus for "Ysengrinia" ginsburgi Morales et al. (1998).	
Neoyunnanotherium	Nom. nov	Valid	Deshmukh & Valenciano	Late Miocene		China	A member of the family Mephitidae; a replacement name for Yunnanotherium Qi (2014).	
Pachyphoca volkodavi	Sp. nov	Valid	Tarasenko	Miocene		Russia (Adygea)	A cystophorine seal.	
Pangurban	Gen. et sp. nov	Valid	Poust, Barrett & Tomiya	Eocene	Pomerado Conglomerate	United States (California)	A member of the family Nimravidae. Genus includes new species P. egiae.	
Panthera gombaszoegensis jinpuensis	Ssp. nov	Valid	Jiangzuo et al.	Middle Pleistocene		China	Announced in 2022; the final article version was published in 2023.	
Panthera principialis	Sp. nov		Hemmer	Pliocene		Tanzania	A species of Panthera.	
Panthera uncia pyrenaica	Ssp. nov	Valid	Hemmer	Pleistocene (Marine Isotope Stage 14)		France	A subspecies of the snow leopard.	
Parailurus tedfordi	Sp. nov	Valid	Wallace & Lyon	Pliocene (Blancan)		United States (Washington)	A member of the family Ailuridae. Published online in 2021, but the copyright is listed as © 2022.	
Paramachaerodus yingliangi	Sp. nov	Valid	Jiangzuo et al.	Late Miocene		China	A metailurine felid.	
Percrocuta xixiaensis	Sp. nov	Valid	Xiong	Miocene	Zhang'embao Formation	China		
Protocyon orocualensis	Sp. nov	Valid	Ruiz-Ramoni, Wang & Rincón	Late Pliocene/Early Pleistocene		Venezuela	A Cerdocyonina canine. Announced in 2021; the final article version was published in 2022.	
Taowu	Gen. et sp. nov	In press	Jiangzuo, Werdelin & Sun	Early Pleistocene		China	A member of Machairodontinae. The type species is T. liui.	
Tartarocyon	Gen. et sp. nov	Valid	Solé et al.	Miocene (Serravallian)		France	An amphicyonid. The type species is T. cazanavei.	
Yoshi faie	Sp. nov	Valid	Jiangzuo et al.	Late Miocene		China	A metailurine felid.	
Yoshi yongdengensis	Sp. nov	Valid	Jiangzuo et al.	Late Miocene		China	A metailurine felid.	

==== Carnivoran research ====
- A study on the fossils of carnivorans from the Miocene (Messinian) of Cava Monticino (Italy), including fossil material of Eucyon monticinensis representing one of the oldest, certain records of the genus Eucyon in the Old World and fossil material of Mellivora benfieldi representing the northernmost record of the species and the only certain record of the genus Mellivora outside of Africa, is published by Bartolini-Lucenti, Madurell-Malapeira & Rook (2022).
- Revision of the carnivoran fauna from Libakos in the Pliocene-Pleistocene Grevena–Neapolis Basin (Greece), including the first record of the mustelid Pannonictis nestii from Greece, and a study on the age of this fauna is published by Koufos & Tamvakis (2022).
- Descriptions of fossil material of carnivorans from the Early Pleistocene site of Palan-Tyukan (Azerbaijan), including, among others, some of the latest records of the raccoon dog Nyctereutes megamastoides and the badger Meles thorali, the first record of the otter Lutraeximia cf. umbra from a Transcaucasian Early Pleistocene site, two species of sabertoothed cats (Megantereon cf. cultridens and Homotherium cf. crenatidens), and fossil material of Panthera cf. gombaszoegensis representing one of the earliest records of the genus Panthera in all of Eurasia, are published by Sablin & Iltsevich (2022) and Iltsevich & Sablin (2022).
- A study on the carnivoran activity in the Pleistocene site of Barranco León (Spain), focusing on tooth pits found on bones, is published by Courtenay et al. (2022), who report that, in addition to Homotherium latidens and Pachycrocuta brevirostris, other carnivorans were also active agents in the formation of the site.
- A study on the community structure and dynamics of the guilds of European large carnivorans throughout the Pleistocene is published by Konidaris (2022).
- A study on the morphology of the ossicles of carnivorans from the La Brea Tar Pits is published by Dickinson et al. (2022), who interpret their findings as indicating that large felids (Smilodon fatalis, the American lion) and canids (the dire wolf) from the La Brea Tar Pits likely had similar hearing abilities as extant large felids and canids, respectively, while the ossicles of Arctodus simus were substantially different from those of modern bears, potentially indicating differences in their hearing ranges.
- Fossil material of Amphicyon giganteus is described from a travertine above a layer dated to MN7/8 in the Karacalar Silver Travertine Quarry (Gebeceler Formation, Turkey) by van der Hoek et al. (2022), representing the youngest record of this species reported to date.
- A humerus of a member of the genus Borophagus is described from the Gray Fossil Site (Tennessee, United States) by Bōgner & Samuels (2022), representing the first occurrence of the genus in a heavily forested ecosystem.
- Description of new fossil material of members of the genus Nyctereutes from the Dafnero-3 site (Greece) and previously unpublished specimens from Varshets (Bulgaria), providing the first known evidence of co-existence of Nyctereutes tingi and Nyctereutes megamastoides in Europe, and extending the record of N. tingi in southeastern Europe until the beginning of the middle Villafranchian, is published by Tamvakis et al. (2022).
- Description of new fossil material of Xenocyon lycaonoides from the Jinyuan Cave (China), confirming the presence of this species in eastern Asia during the early Middle Pleistocene, and a study on the affinities of this species is published by Jiangzuo et al. (2022).
- Description of a robust canid dentary from the Pliocene Glenns Ferry Formation (Hagerman Fossil Beds National Monument; Idaho, United States), and a study on the affinities of this specimen and on the diversity of Pliocene canids from Hagerman, is published by Prassack & Walkup (2022).
- Description of a wolf skull from Ponte Galeria (Rome, Italy), representing the first reliable occurrence of this taxon in Europe and the largest skull of a Middle Pleistocene canid from Europe known to date, is published by Iurino et al. (2022), who evaluate the implications of this specimen for the knowledge of the turnover between Canis mosbachensis and modern wolves.
- Diedrich (2022) describes new fossil material of wolves from the Pleistocene of Europe, including a skull from the Srbsko Sluj IV Cave in the Bat Cave system (Czech Republic), interpreted as representing a new early middle Pleistocene taxon that was ancestral to warm climate grey wolves as well as Tundra and Arctic wolves, and a mid-Pleistocene skull of Canis mosbachensis/Canis lupus mosbachensis from the Gernsheim site in the Upper Rhine River Valley (Germany).
- A study on the evolutionary history of grey wolves, based on data from 72 ancient wolf genomes from Europe, Siberia and North America spanning the last 100,000 years, is published by Bergström et al. (2022), who report that none of the analysed ancient wolf genomes is a direct match for the domestic dog ancestries found by the authors, that dogs are overall more closely related to ancient wolves from eastern Eurasia than to those from western Eurasia, but also that dogs in the Near East and Africa derive up to half of their ancestry from a distinct population related to modern southwest Eurasian wolves, which might be caused by admixture from local wolves or by an independent domestication process.
- A study on the evolutionary history of the Japanese wolf, based on ancient DNA data from remains of Pleistocene and Holocene specimens, is published by Segawa et al. (2022).
- A study on the functional morphology of the skull of the Pleistocene badger Meles dimitrius is published by Savvidou et al. (2022).
- Fossil material of a panda possibly belonging to the species Ailurarctos lufengensis, preserving the earliest enlarged radial sesamoid (panda's false thumb) reported to date, is described from the late Miocene Shuitangba site (Zhaotong Basin; Yunnan, China) by Wang et al. (2022).
- Hu et al. (2022) describe new fossil material of Ailuropoda melanoleuca baconi from Yanjinggou (China), representing the best-preserved skull material of this subspecies reported to date, and interpret this taxon as a valid subspecies of the giant panda and the senior synonym of Ailuropoda fovealis/Ailuropoda melanoleuca fovealis.
- Fossil material of Ursus etruscus, expanding knowledge of the morphological diversity and evolution of this species, is described from the Taurida cave (Crimea) by Gimranov et al. (2022).
- A study on the skeletal morphology, affinities and likely paleoecology of small-sized cave bears (originally assigned to the taxon Ursus savini) from the Imanay Cave (Russia) is published by Gimranov et al. (2022).
- A study on the microwear of the non-occlusal surface of incisors of the small cave bear and Ural cave bear from the Pleistocene of the Middle and South Urals, and on its implications for the knowledge of the trophic specialization of these cave bears, is published by Gimranov, Zykov & Kosintsev (2022).
- Review of the knowledge of the taxonomy and phylogeny, biology, distribution, occurrence and extinction times, and interaction with humans of large and small cave bears in the Urals is published by Gimranov & Kosintsev (2022).
- A study on the upper and lower canines of cave bears from Medvezhiya Cave (Komi Republic, Russia), Kizel Cave (Perm Krai, Russia), Shiriaevo 1 Cave (Samara Oblast, Russia), Akhshtyrskaya Cave (Krasnodar Krai, Russia) and Kudaro 3 Cave (South Ossetia), evaluating the implications of these teeth for the knowledge of the ecology of cave bears from these sites, is published by Prilepskaya, Bachura & Baryshnikov (2022).
- A study on the evolutionary history and phylogeography of ancient and modern brown bears, based on data from mitochondrial genomes of four ancient (~4.5–40 thousand years old) bears from South Siberia and modern bears from South Siberia and the Russian Far East, is published by Molodtseva et al. (2022).
- Review of the historical distribution of ancient polar bear remains across the Arctic is published by Crockford (2022).
- A study on the evolutionary history of brown and polar bears, incorporating data from the genome of a Pleistocene polar bear specimen from the Svalbard Archipelago (Norway), is published by Lan et al. (2022).
- Evidence from paleogenome from an approximately 100,000-year-old polar bear from Arctic Alaska (United States), indicative of massive prehistoric, and mainly unidirectional, gene flow from polar bears into brown bears which was not visible from genomic data derived from living polar bears, is presented by Wang et al. (2022).
- A study on the diets of Arctodus simus, brown bears and American black bears from the Late Pleistocene of the Vancouver Island (Canada) is published by Kubiak et al. (2022), who interpret their findings as indicative of niche differentiation between these species.
- A study on the anatomy of the hindlimbs and locomotor abilities of Amphicynodon leptorhynchus is published by Gardin et al. (2022), who interpret their findings as indicative of A. leptorhynchus being an agile climber.
- A study aiming to determine possible patterns of morphological convergence in cranial shape between Kolponomos newportensis and sabretoothed cats is published by Modafferi et al. (2022).
- Fossil remains of a monachine seal are reported from the late Miocene–Pliocene sediments of Guafo Island (Chile) by Valenzuela-Toro & Pyenson (2022), extending the geographic range of the fossil record of seals in Chile by 1000 km and representing the southernmost occurrence of a fossil seal from the South Pacific.
- New phocine fossil material is described from the Miocene locality of Eldari I (Georgia) by Vanishvili (2022), who assigns the species "Phoca" procaspica to the genus Praepusa.
- Fossil material of members of the genus Palaeogale is described from the Oligocene John Day Formation (Oregon, United States) by Famoso & Orcutt (2022), representing the first known records of this genus from the Pacific Northwest of North America.
- A well-preserved skull of Stenoplesictis minor is described from the Oligocene Quercy Phosphorites Formation (France) by de Bonis et al. (2022), who present a reconstruction of brain endocast, stapes and bony labyrinths of this specimen.
- A mandible of the largest specimen belonging to the genus Pachycrocuta reported to date, with dental morphology similar to that of Pachycrocuta from Zhoukoudian, is described from the Middle Pleistocene loess in Luoning (Henan, China) by Jiangzuo et al. (2022).
- Review of the fossil record and a revision of the species-level taxonomy of the genus Crocuta is published by Lewis & Werdelin (2022).
- A study on the diets and ecological niches of cave hyenas from the Prolom 2 grotto (Crimea) and the Bukhtarminskaya Cave (eastern Kazakhstan) as well as Crocuta ultima ussurica from the Geographical Society Cave (Primorsky Krai, Russia), based on data from tooth microwear, is published by Rivals et al. (2022), who interpret their findings as indicative of overall similarity with the known diets of extant spotted hyenas, as well as indicative of differences between the adults exhibiting a bone crushing behavior, and the juveniles that may have included a larger proportion of meat in their diet.
- A study on the biting biomechanics of sabretoothed cats and nimravids is published by Chatar, Fischer & Tseng (2022), who interpret their findings as confirming that carnivorans with long upper canines had a better stress repartition and were adapted to bite at larger angles, but otherwise indicating that the mandibular architectures of sabretooth and non-sabretooth forms reacted similarly in a mechanical efficiency and strain energy framework, and consider this to be suggestive of the presence of a continuous rather than bipolar spectrum of hunting methods in cat-like carnivorans.
- A study on the fossil record of members of the genus Amphimachairodus in the Chinese Baode strata is published by Wang, Carranza-Castañeda & Tseng (2022), who interpret this record as evidence of anagenetic evolution of increasing size, and study the evolution of members of the genus Amphimachairodus on the basis of all Holarctic records.
- The best-preserved material of Nimravides catocopis is described by Jiangzuo, Li & Deng (2022), who argue that Nimravides was a North American endemic sabertoothed cat rather than an immigrant from Eurasia, that the Old World lineage of sabertoothed cats experienced a higher evolutionary rate of cranial traits, giving rise to a more derived genus Amphimachairodus, and that Amphimachairodus did not immediately replace Nimravides through direct competition after migrating to North America.
- Revised reconstruction of the soft tissue and life appearance of Homotherium latidens is proposed by Antón et al. (2022).
- A complete cranium of Homotherium, with morphology indicative of assignment to Homotherium crenatidens teilhardipiveteaui, is described from the Shigou locality in the Nihewan Basin (China) by Jiangzuo, Zhao & Chen (2022), who interpret this finding as indicative of a largely continuous gene flow within Eurasia during the evolution of Homotherium, and indicating that the subspecies delimitation within the genus Homotherium should be more chronological than geographical.
- Partial mandible of a felid from Taiwan (probably from the Pleistocene Chi-Ting Formation), originally interpreted as a fossil of a member of the genus Felis, is reinterpreted as a fossil of a member of the genus Homotherium by Tsai & Tseng (2022).
- A study on feeding damage from Xenosmilus hodsonae in the large mammalian fauna from the Irvingtonian paleo-sinkhole Haile 21A (Florida, United States), and on its implications for the knowledge of the carcass processing capabilities of Xenosmilus and of the sabertooth paleoecology in the Pleistocene, is published by Domínguez-Rodrigo et al. (2022).
- Description of postcranial remains of a large-bodied sabretooth felid from the Lower Pliocene site of Langebaanweg "E" Quarry (South Africa), interpreted as more similar in morphology and proportions to Machairodus aphanistus and Lokotunjailurus emageritus than to Amphimachairodus giganteus, is published by Rabe, Chinsamy & Valenciano (2022), who report pathologies in the foot and lumbar spine of the studied specimen interpreted as consistent with severe osteoarthritis, limiting limb mobility of the studied specimen and possibly making its long-term survival dependent on it being a social animal.
- New fossil material of a lynx belonging or related to the species Lynx issiodorensis is described from the Villafranchian site of La Puebla de Valverde (Spain) by Cuccu et al. (2022), who evaluate the implications of this finding for the knowledge of the European lynx fossil record.
- Description of Late Pleistocene remains of the Iberian lynx from Avenc del Marge del Moro (Garraf Massif, Catalonia, Spain) is published by Tura-Poch et al. (2022).
- Description of the fossil material of Miracinonyx trumani from the Next Door Cave, Rampart Cave and Stanton's Cave (Grand Canyon; Arizona, United States), and a study on the implications of these fossils for the knowledge of the ecology of M. trumani, is published by Hodnett et al. (2022).
- Figueirido et al. (2022) describe the anatomy of the brain of Miracinonyx trumani, report that the brain of M. trumani differed from the brain of extant cheetah, and argue that Miracinonyx might not have been as specialized as the cheetah in deploying a fast-running pursuit.
- Large felid remains assigned to the species Panthera fossilis are described from the Grotte de la Carrière in Eastern Pyrenees by Prat-Vericat et al. (2022), who evaluate the implications of these fossils for the knowledge of the paleobiology of P. fossilis.
- Two specimens of Panthera spelaea are described from the Middle and Late Pleistocene Songhua River fossil assemblages (China) by Sherani, Perng & Sherani (2022), representing the first records of this species from the Mammuthus-Coelodonta fauna from the Pleistocene assemblages of the Songhua River reported to date.
- Review of the fossil record of lions and lion-like felids from Ukraine is published by Marciszak et al. (2022), who interpret the studied fossils as confirming the gradual decrease in body size of Panthera spelaea.
- A study on the size and shape differences among lions and Pleistocene lion-like felids from Europe, Asia and North America is published by Sabol, Tomašových & Gullár (2022), who interpret their findings as indicating that Panthera fossilis and P. spelaea potentially belong to one chronospecies, while Panthera atrox differs from other lion forms and could be considered a separate taxon.
- A study on the anatomy and affinities of Panthera gombaszoegensis, based on data from a new skull from Belgium, is published by Chatar, Michaud & Fischer (2022), who interpret this felid as more closely related to the tiger than to the jaguar.

=== Chiroptera ===
Name	Novelty	Status	Authors	Age	Type locality	Country	Notes	Images
Palaeochiropteryx sambuceus	Sp. nov	Valid	Czaplewski et al.	Eocene (Bridgerian)	Sheep Pass Formation	United States (Nevada)	A member of the family Palaeochiropterygidae.	
Rhinolophus macrorhinus cimmerius	Ssp. nov	Valid	Lopatin	Early Pleistocene		Crimean Peninsula	A horseshoe bat.	
Sonor	Gen. et sp. nov	Valid	Czaplewski et al.	Eocene (Bridgerian)	Sheep Pass Formation	United States (Nevada)	A probable member of the family Vespertilionidae. The type species is S. handae.	
Volactrix	Gen. et sp. nov	Valid	Czaplewski et al.	Eocene (Bridgerian)	Sheep Pass Formation	United States (Nevada)	Possibly a member of the family Onychonycteridae. The type species is V. simmonsae.	

==== Chiropteran research ====
- A study on the Late Pleistocene to the Late Holocene bat fossil record along the stratigraphical sequence of El Mirador (Burgos, Spain), preserving bats belonging to the current Iberian fauna but in an association with no extant equivalent, and providing evidence of high biodiversity among the Iberian Early Holocene bat communities, is published by Galán García et al. (2022).

=== Eulipotyphla ===
Name	Novelty	Status	Authors	Age	Type locality	Country	Notes	Images
Dzavui	Gen. et sp. nov	Valid	Crespo & Jiménez-Hidalgo in Jiménez-Hidalgo, Guerrero-Arenas & Crespo	Oligocene (Rupelian)		Mexico	A gymnure. The type species is D. landeri.	
Ishimosorex	Gen. et sp. nov	Valid	Zazhigin & Voyta	Late Miocene	Ishim Formation	Kazakhstan	A red-toothed shrew belonging to the tribe Anourosoricini. The type species is I. ishimiensis.	
Ladakhechinus	Gen. et sp. nov	Journal of Asian Earth Sciences:X	Wazir et al.	Late Oligocene	Kargil Formation	India	A hedgehog. The type species is L. iugummontis.	
Magnatalpa	Gen. et sp. nov	Valid	Oberg & Samuels	Pliocene	Gray Fossil Site	United States (Tennessee)	Probably a stem desman. The type species is M. fumamons.	
Noritrimylus	Gen. et comb. nov	Valid	Korth et al.	Possibly Chadronian to Arikareean		United States (Colorado; Nebraska; South Dakota)	A shrew belonging to the subfamily Heterosoricinae. The type species is "Domnina" compressa Galbreath (1953); genus also includes "Trimylus" dakotensis Repenning (1967) and "Pseudotrimylus" metaxy Korth (2020).	
Ocajila macdonaldi	Sp. nov	Valid	Korth	Whitneyan		United States (Montana)	A member of the family Erinaceidae.	
Ocajila rasmusseni	Sp. nov	Valid	Korth	Arikareean		United States (Montana)	A member of the family Erinaceidae.	
Oligoryctes tenutalonidus	Sp. nov	Valid	Korth et al.	Chadronian-Orellan	Chadron Formation	United States (Nebraska)	A member of the family Oligoryctidae.	
Paranourosorex intermedius	Sp. nov	Valid	Zazhigin & Voyta	Late Miocene and early Pliocene	Novaya Stanitsa Formation	Kazakhstan; Russia (Omsk Oblast)	A red-toothed shrew belonging to the tribe Anourosoricini.	
Parascalops grayensis	Sp. nov	Valid	Oberg & Samuels	Pliocene	Gray Fossil Site	United States (Tennessee)	A species of Parascalops.	
Plesiosorex shanqini	Sp. nov	Valid	Li	Miocene		China	A member of the family Plesiosoricidae.	
Sonidolestes	Gen. et sp. nov		Li et al.	Early Miocene		China	A hedgehog. Genus includes new species S. wendusui.	

==== Eulipotyphlean research ====
- Fossil material of the erinaceid Galerix rutlandae and a talpid belonging to the subfamily Uropsilinae, representing the first known record of these families from the Miocene Siwalik exposures of India and the first record of an uropsiline from the Indian subcontinent, is described by Parmar, Norboo & Magotra (2022).
- Fossil material of Van Sung's shrew and Chodsigoa hoffmanni is described from the Pleistocene of the Tham Hai cave and Lang Trang cave (Vietnam) by Lopatin (2022), representing the first fossil records of these species and the first fossil remains of members of the genus Chodsigoa found outside China.

=== Perissodactyla ===
Name	Novelty	Status	Authors	Age	Type locality	Country	Notes	Images
Equus vekuae	Sp. nov		Eisenmann	Early Pleistocene		Georgia	A species of Equus.	
Ulanodon	Nom. nov	Valid	Bai & Qi	Eocene		China	A hyracodontid; a replacement name for Ulania Qi (1990).	

==== Perissodactyl research ====
- Revision of odd-toed ungulate taxa from the Eocene Lijiang Formation (China) is published by Bai (2022), who interprets Rhodopagus yunnanensis as a junior synonym of the palaeothere species Lijiangia zhangi, considers Lunania to be a palaeothere rather than a chalicothere, interprets Lophiohippus as a likely junior synonym of Lunania, and transfers Teleolophus xiangshanensis to the deperetellid genus Diplolophodon.
- A study on the evolutionary variation of shape in hindlimb long bones of members of Rhinocerotoidea, and on its relationship with mass, size and gracility, is published by Mallet et al. (2022).
- A study on the paleoecology of late Miocene rhinocerotids the Balkan-Iranian zoogeographic province, as inferred from tooth microwear, is published by Hullot et al. (2022),
- A study on the body mass of giant rhinos and its evolution, based on data from a skeleton of a member of the paracerathere genus Dzungariotherium from the Qingshuiying Formation (China), is published by Li, Jiangzuo & Deng (2022).
- Redescription of the holotype and a study on the affinities of Parelasmotherium schansiense is published by Kampouridis et al. (2022).
- Description of new fossil material of Pliorhinus megarhinus from the early Pliocene of the Vera Basin (Spain) and a study on the biochronology and biogeography of the Pliocene rhinocerotines from Spain is published by Pandolfi et al. (2022).
- Description of the fossil material of a woolly rhinoceros from the Middle Pleistocene Les Rameaux locality (France) is published by Uzunidis, Antoine & Brugal (2022), who refer this material to the subspecies Coelodonta antiquitatis praecursor, interpret their findings as supporting the identification of C. a. praecursor and C. a. antiquitatis as distinct and valid subspecies, refute the taxonomic assignment of the rhinocerotid skull from Bad Frankenhausen skull to the species Coelodonta tologoijensis, an propose the first comprehensive phylogeny for Coelodonta.
- Review of the Eocene fossil record of equoids from the Iberian Peninsula is published by Badiola et al. (2022).
- New fossil material of palaeotheriids, including the first known records of upper teeth of Franzenium durense and first known mandible and lower teeth of Cantabrotherium, is described from the Eocene (Bartonian) of Mazaterón (Soria, Almazán Basin, Spain) by Perales-Gogenola et al. (2022).
- Description of new fossil material of members of the genus Hippotherium from the Miocene of the Linxia Basin (China), providing new information on the skeletal anatomy of members of this genus, and a study on their locomotor capabilities and adaptations to their environment is published by Sun et al. (2022).
- A study on the systematic affinities and dietary behavior of Turolian hipparions from the Cioburciu site (Balta Formation; Moldova) is published by Răţoi et al. (2022).
- A study on the relationship between size and diet in hipparionins from Vallesian and Turolian circum-Mediterranean localities is published by Orlandi-Oliveras et al. (2022).
- Review of the latest occurrences of the hipparions in the Old World, and a study on the taxonomy of the last hipparions is published by van der Made et al. (2022).
- Fossil material of six taxa of equids is described from the Xinyaozi Ravine (Shanxi, China) by Dong et al. (2022), who report the presence of two hipparionine taxa interpreted as Neogene relics in an Early Pleistocene fauna.
- Revision of the fossil material of equids from the Khaprovskii Faunal Complex (Russia) is published by Eisenmann (2022).
- A study on metapodials of Pleistocene horses from eastern Beringia is published by Landry, Roloson & Fraser (2022), who report evidence of plasticity in metapodial morphology, indicating that metapodials do not reliably differentiate distinct species of Beringian horses.
- Revision of the taxonomy of equids from the late Middle Pleistocene to Early Holocene of Apulia (Italy) and a study on their biochronology is published by Mecozzi & Strani (2022).
- Revision of the fossil material of Equus stehlini from the Villafranchian of the Upper Valdarno Basin (Tuscany, Italy) is published by Cirilli (2022).
- A study on the phylogenetic affinities of members of the genus Equus belonging to the subgenus Sussemionus, timing of their divergence relative to other non-caballine equids, and their demographic trajectory until their extinction, based on data from genomes and radiocarbon dating of specimens of Equus ovodovi from northern China, is published by Cai et al. (2022), who interpret their findings as indicating that the Sussemionus lineage survived until ~3,500 years ago.
- Systematic revision of tridactyl and monodactyl horses from the Pliocene and Pleistocene, and a study on their evolution and associated paleoenvironments, is published by Cirilli et al. (2022).

=== Other laurasiatherians ===
Name	Novelty	Status	Authors	Age	Type locality	Country	Notes	Images
Charruatoxodon	Gen. et sp. nov	Valid	Ferrero et al.	Late Pliocene–early Pleistocene		Uruguay	A toxodontid notoungulate. The type species is C. uruguayensis.	
Diegoaelurus	Gen. et sp. nov	In press	Zack, Poust, & Wagner	Mid Eocene	Santiago Formation	United States (California)	A machaeroidine oxyaenid. The type species is D. vanvalkenburghae.	
Kyraodus	Gen. et sp. nov	Valid	Zimicz et al.	Eocene (Itaboraian)	Lumbrera Formation	Argentina	A South American native ungulate, possibly a relative of mioclaenids, litopterns, didolodontids and phenacodontids. The type species is K. churcalensis.	

==== Miscellaneous laurasiatherian research ====
- A study on footprints from the Miocene Vinchina Formation (Argentina) attributed to early toxodontids and macraucheniids is published by Vera & Krapovickas (2022), who name new ichnotaxa Macrauchenichnus troyana and Llastaya yesera, and interpret the facies of the studied footprint assemblage as indicating that the trackmakers inhabited mixed grassland-woodland ecosystems developed under warm and seasonal climates.
- A study on the fossil record of litopterns from the Cerro Azul Formation in localities of La Pampa and Buenos Aires provinces (Argentina) is published by Schmidt et al. (2022), who report the presence of eight taxa of Macraucheniidae and six of Proterotheriidae, interpreted as showing affinity with the assemblage from the Late Miocene levels of the Lower Member of the Ituzaingó Formation in Entre Ríos Province of Argentina.
- A study on the anatomy and paleoecology of Notostylops murinus, based on data from a nearly complete specimen, is published by Vera, Medina-González & Moreno (2022), who interpret their findings as indicating that early-diverging notoungulates Notostylops and Notopithecus had different locomotor capabilities, which were likely associated with early niche diversifications.
- New fossil material of Oligocene typotherian notoungulates is described from the Quebrada Fiera locality (Argentina) by Hernández Del Pino, Seoane & Cerdeño (2022), providing new information on the anatomy of "Prohegetotherium" schiaffinoi and completing known ontogenetic sequence of the species Archaeohyrax suniensis.
- Fragment of a mandible of a notoungulate belonging to the group Interatheriinae is described from the Messinian to Zanclean Tunuyán Formation (Argentina) by Vera & Romano (2022), representing the first record of an interatheriine from this formation and the youngest record of this group reported to date.
- Fernández-Monescillo et al. (2022) identify Pseudotypotherium pulchrum Ameghino (1904) as the type species of the genus Pseudotypotherium.
- Revision of the Early-Middle Pleistocene mesotheriine notoungulates is published by Fernández-Monescillo et al. (2022), who interpret the variation among the studied material as consistent with intraspecific and ontogenetic variation in a single species, recognised as Mesotherium cristatum.
- A study on the morphological tooth variation in Tremacyllus and on its systematic significance is published by Armella et al. (2022), who recognize Tremacyllus incipiens as a valid taxon.
- A study on carbon and oxygen isotopic values of tooth enamel of Toxodon platensis from two localities in the Brazilian Intertropical Region is published by Gomes et al. (2022) who interpret the studied samples as representing the record of at least three years under different climate regimes, and indicating that the feeding behaviour of the studied toxodonts was not significantly influenced by different climatic conditions.
- Matsui, Valenzuela-Toro & Pyenson (2022) describe a molar of a desmostylian belonging or related to the species Neoparadoxia cecilialina, originally collected in 1913 from the Miocene "Topanga" Formation near Corona (Riverside County, California, United States) and thus representing the historically oldest paleoparadoxiid specimen, and providing new information on the morphological variation in teeth of paleoparadoxiids.
- A study on the postcranial anatomy and likely locomotion of Patriofelis ulta, based on data from two partial skeletons, is published by Kort et al. (2022).
- Flink & Werdelin (2022) reconstruct digital endocasts of Quercygale angustidens and Gustafsonia cognita, and evaluate the implications of their anatomy for the knowledge of the evolution of the brain at the origin of Carnivora.

== Xenarthrans ==
=== Cingulata ===
Name	Novelty	Status	Authors	Age	Type locality	Country	Notes	Images
Kelenkura	Gen. et sp. nov	Valid	Barasoain et al.	Late Miocene		Argentina	A glyptodont. The type species is K. castroi.	

==== Cingulatan research ====
- Fossil remains of a juvenile pampathere belonging to the genus Holmesina are described from the Gruta do Urso cave (Brazil) by Avilla et al. (2022), providing new information on the anatomy of pampatheres at the early stages of their life.
- A study investigating the rates of morphological evolution of the skulls of the glyptodonts is published by Machado, Marroig & Hubbe (2022).
- Description of the most complete skull of Eleutherocercus antiquus from the Pliocene Monte Hermoso Formation, as well as the first description of the carapace of E. solidus from the late Miocene-Pliocene from Catamarca Province (Argentina), and a study on the phylogenetic relationships of doedicurine glyptodonts is published by Nuñez-Blasco et al. (2022).
- Description of new fossil material of Utaetus buccatus from the Eocene Guabirotuba Formation (Brazil), expanding known geographic distribution of this species and representing the first record semi-movable osteoderms in this species reported to date, is published by Sedor et al. (2022).

=== Pilosa ===
Name	Novelty	Status	Authors	Age	Type locality	Country	Notes	Images
Mcdonaldocnus	Gen. et comb. nov	Valid	Gaudin et al.	Friasian to Montehermosan		Argentina; Bolivia	A member of the family Nothrotheriidae. The type species is "Xyophorus" bondesioi Scillato-Yané (1979).	

==== Pilosan research ====
- A study on the phylogenetic relationships and the evolutionary history of sloths is published by Casali et al. (2022).
- A study on mandibles of extant and extinct sloths, aiming to determine stress patterns during the action of jaw-closing muscles and evaluating their implications for the knowledge of the feeding habits of extinct sloths, is published by Bomfim Melki, de Souza Barbosa & Paglarelli Bergqvist (2022).
- Description of the skull and jaw anatomy of a juvenile specimen of Acratocnus ye from the Holocene of Haiti, and a study on the ontogenetic changes in the skull of this sloth, is published by Gaudin & Scaife (2022).
- A study aiming to determine the diet of nine giant ground sloth species from the Brazilian Intertropical Region is published by Dantas & Santos (2022).
- Boscaini et al. (2022) describe new fossil material of Glossotherium chapadmalense from the Chapadmalal Formation (Argentina), providing information on the anatomy of this sloth, and confirm the assignment of this Pliocene species to the genus Glossotherium.
- Fossil material of Thalassocnus is reported from the Miocene–Pliocene Tafna Formation by Quiñones et al. (2022), representing the first record of this genus from Argentina, and extending its range from coastal environments to more terrestrial ones.
- A study on the pathological modifications on three articulated vertebrae of a specimen of Eremotherium laurillardi from the Toca das Onças cave (Brazil), and on their implications for the knowledge of the likely cause of death of the animal and on the incorporation mode of skeletal remains into the cave in general, is published by Barbosa et al. (2022).
- A study on an adult, a subadult and an infant specimen of Megalonyx jeffersonii from the Tarkio site (Iowa, United States) is published by Semken et al. (2022), who consider it most likely that the studied individuals represent a social unit (probably a mother and two offspring, with parental care in Megalonyx potentially extending beyond weaning of an older sibling) and died contemporaneously, and attempt to determine average lifespan, gestation time, the interbirth interval and the timing of sexual maturation in Megalonyx.

=== General xenarthran research ===
- New mylodontine sloth and glyptodont fossil material, possibly representing new taxa, is described from the Miocene (Tortonian) Letrero Formation (Ecuador) by Román-Carrión et al. (2022), who note the presence of morphological differences between xenarthrans from this formation and other Miocene xenarthran specimens, possibly indicative of isolation of xenarthrans from the Letrero Formation.

== Other eutherians ==
Name	Novelty	Status	Authors	Age	Type locality	Country	Notes	Images
Cokotherium	Gen. et sp. nov		Wang et al.	Early Cretaceous	Jiufotang Formation	China	A basal eutherian. The type species is C. jiufotangensis.	
Indoclemensia	Gen. et sp. nov	In press	Mantilla et al.	Paleocene		India	An indeterminate eutherian. Includes the type species I. naskalensis and I. magnus.	
Namibiodon	Gen. et sp. nov	Valid	Goin, Crespo & Pickford	Eocene (Ypresian-Lutetian)		Namibia	A member of the family Adapisoriculidae. The type species is N. australis.	
Sivatupaia	Gen. et sp. nov	Disputed	Sehgal et al.	Miocene		India	A placental mammal of uncertain affinities. Originally described as a treeshrew; Furió et al. (2025) considered it to be more likely a white-toothed shrew of uncertain generic placement. The type species is S. ramnagarensis.	
Stenoleptictis	Gen. et comb. nov	Valid	Korth	Eocene		United States (Montana)	A member of Leptictida. The type species is "Ictops" thomsoni Matthew (1903).	

=== Miscellaneous eutherian research ===
- A study on the life history of Pantolambda bathmodon, inferred from bone histology and geochemistry, is published by Funston et al. (2022), who interpret their findings as indicative of an approximately 7-months-long gestation, rapid dental development and an approximately 30–to-75-days-long suckling interval, and infer that, unlike non-placental mammals and known Mesozoic precursors, P. bathmodon was highly precocial, reproducing like a placental.
- A study on the teeth eruption sequence, the sequence of cusp mineralisation and the cranial growth of Alcidedorbignya inopinata, as well as on the mortality profile of the assemblage of members of this species from Tiupampa (Bolivia), is published by de Muizon & Billet (2022).
- A study on the age of fossil material, anatomy and phylogenetic relationships of Propyrotherium saxeum, based on data from the most complete specimen found to date, is published by Vera et al. (2022).
- A study on the affinities of extinct South American native ungulates, reassessing the study of Avilla & Mothé (2021) that recovered some of these ungulates were relatives of hyracoids, is published by Kramarz & Macphee (2022), who recover all South American native ungulates as nested within Boreoeutheria.

== Metatherians ==
Name	Novelty	Status	Authors	Age	Type locality	Country	Notes	Images
Gumardee keari	Sp. nov	Valid	Travouillon et al.	Miocene		Australia	A member of Macropodiformes.	
Gumardee webbi	Sp. nov	Valid	Travouillon et al.	Miocene		Australia	A member of Macropodiformes.	
Morotodon	Gen. et sp. nov	Valid	Crespo, Goin & Pickford	Miocene (Burdigalian)		Uganda	Possibly member of the family Herpetotheriidae. The type species is M. aenigmaticus.	
Nombe	Gen. et comb. nov	Valid	Kerr & Prideaux	Late Pleistocene		Papua New Guinea	A member of the family Macropodidae belonging to the subfamily Macropodinae. The type species is "Protemnodon" nombe Flannery et al. (1983).	
Pitheculites ipururensis	Sp. nov	In press	Stutz et al.	Miocene (Laventan)	Ipururo Formation	Peru	A member of Paucituberculata.	

=== Metatherian research ===
- Description of a partial skull of Incadelphys antiquus from the Paleocene Santa Lucía Formation (Bolivia) and a study on the phylogenetic affinities of this mammal is published by de Muizon & Ladevèze (2022), who name a new metatherian superfamily Pucadelphyoidea, including the family Pucadelphyidae and likely also Incadelphys, Aenigmadelphys, Marmosopsis and Szalinia.
- A study aiming to determine whether it is possible to identify the position of isolated sparassodont teeth using linear discriminant analysis is published by Engelman & Croft (2022).
- Description of new fossil material of Callistoe vincei from the Eocene Lower Lumbrera Formation (Argentina) is published by Babot et al. (2022), showing unexpected retention of plesiomorphic traits in the lower molars of this derived sparassodont species, and supports dietary inferences related to hypercarnivory in Callistoe.
- A study on the evolution and likely causes of extinction of sparassodonts is published by Tarquini, Ladevèze & Prevosti (2022).
- A study on the origination and extinction rates of sparassodonts, aiming to determine the cause of their extinction, is published by Pino et al. (2022).
- A study on the phylogenetic relationships of extant and fossil marsupials, based on morphological data consisting of craniodental characters of extant and fossil marsupials and on molecular data, is published by Beck, Voss & Jansa (2022).
- A study on the age of the fossil material of large-bodied marsupials from the Nombe rockshelter (Papua New Guinea) is published by Prideaux et al. (2022), who interpret their findings as indicating that Hulitherium tomasettii inhabited the upper montane forests around Nombe 55,000 years ago, and that Protemnodon tumbuna and a second large, now-extinct kangaroo (possibly Nombe nombe) persisted until at least 27–22,000 years ago, coexisting with humans for at least 30,000 years.
- A study on resistances of pedal bones of sthenurine and macropodine kangaroos to bending and cortical bone distribution, and on their implications for the knowledge of possible differences in locomotion of these kangaroos, is published by Wagstaffe et al. (2022).
- Richards et al. (2022) attempt to determine the ecology of palorchestids from their humeral and femoral shape, and argue that palorchestids used their forelimbs in a specialised manner that has no direct equivalence either with their extinct relatives or among extant mammals.
- New fossil material of Ramsayia magna, representing the most complete cranial remains attributable to a member of the genus Ramsayia reported to date, is described from the Lower Johansons Cave (Queensland, Australia) by Louys et al. (2022), who also study the phylogenetic affinities of Ramsayia, recovering it as closely related to Phascolonus and Sedophascolomys, and interpreting this result as indicative of a single origin of gigantism in wombats.

== Monotremes ==
Name	Novelty	Status	Authors	Age	Type locality	Country	Notes	Images
Murrayglossus	Gen. et comb. nov	Valid	Flannery et al.	Pleistocene		Australia	An echidna. The type species is "Zaglossus" hacketti Glauert (1914).	

== Other mammals ==
Name	Novelty	Status	Authors	Age	Type locality	Country	Notes	Images
Amazighodon	Gen. et sp. nov	Valid	Lasseron et al.	Jurassic–Cretaceous transition	Ksar Metlili Formation	Morocco	A member of the family Donodontidae. The type species is A. orbis.	
Anoualestes	Gen. et sp. nov	Valid	Lasseron et al.	Jurassic–Cretaceous transition	Ksar Metlili Formation	Morocco	A member of the family Donodontidae. The type species is A. incidens.	
Beckumia	Gen. et sp. nov	Valid	Martin et al.	Early Cretaceous (Barremian-Aptian)		Germany	A member of Dryolestidae. The type species is B. sinemeckelia.	
Butlerodon	Gen. et sp. nov	Valid	Mao et al.	Middle Jurassic	White Limestone Formation	United Kingdom	A member of the family Kermackodontidae. Genus includes new species B. quadratus.	
Cifellitherium	Gen. et sp. nov	Valid	Martin et al.	Early Cretaceous (Barremian-Aptian)		Germany	A spalacotheriid symmetrodont. The type species is C. suderlandicum.	
Donodon minor	Sp. nov	Valid	Lasseron et al.	Jurassic–Cretaceous transition	Ksar Metlili Formation	Morocco	A member of the family Donodontidae.	
Erythrobaatar	Gen. et sp. nov	Valid	Jin et al.	Late Cretaceous (Maastrichtian)	Hekou Formation	China	A multituberculate belonging to the group Taeniolabidoidea. The type species is E. ganensis.	
Minutolestes	Gen. et sp. nov	Valid	Martin et al.	Early Cretaceous (Barremian-Aptian)		Germany	A member of Dryolestidae. The type species is M. submersus.	
Stylodens	Gen. et sp. nov	Valid	Lasseron et al.	Jurassic–Cretaceous transition	Ksar Metlili Formation	Morocco	A member of the family Donodontidae. The type species is S. amerrukensis.	
Woodeatonia	Gen. et sp. nov	Valid	Mao et al.	Middle Jurassic	White Limestone Formation	United Kingdom	An allotherian of uncertain affinities. Genus includes new species W. parva.	

=== Other mammalian research ===
- A mammalian petrosal is described from the Lower Cretaceous (Berriasian–Barremian) Batylykh Formation at Teete locality (Sakha, Russia) by Schultz et al. (2022), who tentatively interpret this petrosal as likely to be of eutriconodontan origin.
- Weaver et al. (2022) present evidence indicating that proportions of different bone tissue microstructures in the femoral cortices of small extant marsupials and placentals correlate with length of lactation period, study the bone histology of Late Cretaceous and Paleocene multituberculates, and argue that multituberculates likely had a similar reproductive strategy to placentals, with prolonged gestation and abbreviated lactation periods.
- Second specimen of Corriebaatar marywaltersae, providing new information on the anatomy of this species and confirming its multituberculate affinities, is described from the Early Cretaceous Flat Rocks fossil site (Eumeralla Formation, Australia) by Rich et al. (2022).
- Description of new fossil material of Barbatodon oardaensis from Romania is published by Solomon et al. (2022).
- Review of the fossil record of kogaionids from Transylvania (Romania) is published Csiki-Sava et al. (2022), who report four new occurrences from the Hațeg Basin, and reassess the chronostratigraphical and geographical distribution of kogaionids and their evolutionary patterns.
- Description of a new specimen of Lactodens sheni from the Lower Cretaceous Jiufotang Formation (China), and a study comparing the morphology of the mandible and teeth of this species and Origolestes lii, is published by Mao, Liu & Meng (2022).
- A study on the mastication of Peligrotherium tropicalis is published by Harper, Adkins & Rougier (2022).
- Review of the fossil record of the Mesozoic tribosphenic mammals from the Southern Hemisphere is published by Flannery et al. (2022), who argue that Tribosphenida evolved in the Southern Hemisphere in the Early Jurassic, and name a new family Bishopidae including Bishops whitmorei from the "Wonthaggi Formation" and related unnamed mammals from the Eumeralla Formation (Australia) and Mata Amarilla Formation (Argentina), argued to form a sister group to therians.

== General research ==
- A study on the phylogenetic relationships of extant and fossil mammals, including previously untested fossils from the Cretaceous-Paleogene transition, is published by Velazco et al. (2022), who recover a new eutherian sister group to Placentalia, and recover Deltatheridium as a marsupial, extending the minimum age of Marsupialia before the Cretaceous-Paleogene boundary.
- A study on the evolution of the brain size relative to the body size in placental mammals after the Cretaceous–Paleogene extinction event is published by Bertrand et al. (2022), who interpret their findings as indicating that during the Paleocene the majority of branches of placentals exhibited faster rates of body mass increase than brain volume increase, and that relative brain size in crown orders increased in the Eocene.
- A study on patterns and possible drivers of the evolution of placental skulls throughout the Cenozoic is published by Goswami et al. (2022), who interpret their findings as indicative of an overall long-term decline in the rate of evolutionary change, punctuated by bursts of innovation that decreased in amplitude over the past 66 million years.
- A study on the evolution of terrestrial carnivorous mammal diversity in Europe during the Paleogene is published by Solé et al. (2022).
- New fossil material of Lagopsis penai and a member of the genus Cainotherium belonging or related to the species C. huerzeleri is described from the Miocene Ribesalbes-Alcora Basin (Spain) by Crespo et al. (2022), who compare the relative abundance of Miocene cainotheriids and lagomorphs in the area, and discuss possible direct interaction between members of both groups.
- A study on the diet and habitat of herbivorous mammals from the middle Miocene Maboko Formation (Kenya), inferred from stable carbon and oxygen isotope data from herbivore enamel, is published by Arney et al. (2022).
- Review of the mammalian dispersals from the Old World to the New World at the end of the Miocene is published by Jiangzuo & Wang (2022), who interpret their findings as suggestive of three phases of dispersals, with different environmental preferences of mammals from every phase, interpreted as reflecting the gradually increasing humidification in northeastern Asia at the end of the Miocene.
- A study on the environmental variability in Africa during the Pliocene and Pleistocene, and on the impact of this environmental variability on the evolution of African mammals, is published by Cohen et al. (2022).
- New marine mammal assemblage, including the youngest pre-Pleistocene earless seal record in South America, is described from the Pliocene Horcón Formation (Chile) by Benites-Palomino et al. (2022).
- A study aiming to determine whether the ungulate community associated with Australopithecus afarensis at the Pliocene site of Laetoli (Tanzania) shares similarities with extant communities, and evaluating the implications of this ungulate community for the knowledge of the paleoecology of A. afarensis, is published by Fillion, Harrison & Kwekason (2022).
- Systematic description of the Early Pleistocene large mammal fauna from the Maka'amitalu basin (lower Awash Valley, Ethiopia) is published by Rowan et al. (2022).
- Description of the fossil material of bovids from the Cooper's D site (South Africa), and a study on the implications of these fossils for paleoenvironmental reconstructions and for the knowledge of habitat preferences of Paranthropus robustus and early members of the genus Homo, is published by Hanon et al. (2022).
- Review of the small mammal fossils from the Dmanisi site (Georgia) is published by Agustí et al. (2022), who interpret the small mammal assemblage from this site as composed mainly by Western or Central Asian taxa with poor representation of European elements, and indicating that the habitat occupied by the hominids of Dmanisi was characterized by the prevalence of arid conditions.
- A study on the equid and suid fossil material from the Early Pleistocene site of Palan-Tyukan (Azerbaijan), and on the implications of these fossils for paleoenvironmental reconstructions, is published by Iltsevich & Sablin (2022).
- A study on the foraging ecology of mammals, including early Gigantopithecus blacki, from the Early Pleistocene of the Liucheng Gigantopithecus Cave (Guangxi, China), as indicated by calcium isotope data, is published by Hu et al. (2022).
- Revision of the Middle Pleistocene mammalian fauna from the Oumm Qatafa Cave in Palestine, and a study on the implications of this fauna for paleoenvironmental reconstructions, is published by Marom et al. (2022).
- A study on the abundance of megafauna from Eifel (Germany) during the last 60,000 years is published by Sirocko et al. (2022), who interpret their findings as indicating that the abundance of the studied megafauna was not affected by the presence of humans or by periods of active volcanism, and that the main cause of the decrease and eventual disappearance of megafauna from Eifel was the development of woodlands.
- A study on the fossil material of reindeers and rodents from the Jankovich Cave and Rejtek I Rock Shelter and on the fossil material of woolly mammoths from the Carpathian Basin (Hungary) is published by Magyari et al. (2022), who evaluate the hypothesis that rapid climate change during the last glacial termination was briefly optimal for grazing megafauna, but these brief optima were followed by rapid regional extinctions, and attempt to determine the order of faunistic and vegetation biome changes in East-Central Europe and its casual linkage.
- A study on the homogenization of North American mammalian assemblages throughout the past 30,000 years is published by Fraser et al. (2022), who interpret their findings as indicating that this homogenization commenced between 15,000 and 10,000 years before present for mammals larger than 1 kg and 10,000–5,000 years before present for all mammals.
- A study on the impact of the end-Pleistocene megafauna extinction on the mammal community from the Edwards Plateau (Texas, United States) is published by Smith et al. (2022), who present evidence indicative of a significant reorganization of the community and a loss of ecological complexity.
- A study aiming to determine whether brain size was a significant correlate of probability of extinction in Late Quaternary mammals is published by Dembitzer et al. (2022).
- A study aiming to determine whether some places, times and types of environment gave rise to abnormal numbers of new species of mammals, based on data from Late Cenozoic fossil record of mammals in Europe, is published by Toivonen, Fortelius & Žliobaitė (2022).
- A study on the individual dietary preferences of herbivorous mammals from the Miocene to the present, aiming to determine whether herbivorous generalist species were composed of generalist or specialist individuals, is published by DeSantis et al. (2022).
- Gibert et al. (2022) present a spatio-temporal framework that can be used to examine spatial dynamics of Neogene and Pleistocene Old World mammalian communities.
- A study on changes of the regional diversity of Asian mammals through time is published by Feijó et al. (2022), who interpret their findings as indicating that southern Asia was the main cradle of Asia's mammal diversity, that mountain biodiversity hotspots in the Himalayas and Hengduan Mountains acted mainly as accumulation centers rather than as centers of diversification, and that the diversification bursts and biotic turnovers of Asian mammals were temporally associated with tectonic events and drastic reorganization of climate during the Cenozoic.
- A study on changes to terrestrial mammal food webs over the past ~130,000 years is published by Fricke et al. (2022), who present evidence of a 53% decline in food web links globally, caused in part by extinctions and in part by range losses for extant species.
