= Miophyseter =

Miophyseter Temporal range: lower Miocene (Burdigalian)

Scientific classification
- Kingdom: Animalia
- Phylum: Chordata
- Class: Mammalia
- Order: Artiodactyla
- Infraorder: Cetacea
- Superfamily: Physeteroidea
- Genus: †Miophyseter; Kimura & Hasegawa, 2022
- Species: †M. chitaensis

Binomial name
- †Miophyseter chitaensis Kimura & Hasegawa, 2022

Extinct genus of mammals

Miophyseter is an extinct genus of sperm whale in the superfamily Physeteroidea. It includes two species, M. chitaensis, that was described in 2022 from the lower Miocene (Burdigalian) of Toyohama Formation, Chita District, Aichi Prefecture, and the other species, M. gunmaensis that was described in 2026 from Gunma Prefecture, Japan. This species is known from the well-preserved cranium with detached teeth and ear bones (periotic, tympanic bulla, and malleus). Miophyseter is part of the Physeteroidea stem group, but more closely related to the crown group than to the macroraptorial sperm whales known from middle and late Miocene. Miophyster may have had an adaptation to deep diving and / or developed pterygoid muscles for active biting. The researchers made this conclusion judging by the presence of a deep and large notch on the ventral surface of the palatine bone and pterygoid. Miophyseter is estimated to have been 4.63 meters (15.2 ft) long.
