= Parascalops grayensis =

Parascalops grayensis Temporal range: Early Pliocene

Scientific classification
- Domain: Eukaryota
- Kingdom: Animalia
- Phylum: Chordata
- Class: Mammalia
- Order: Eulipotyphla
- Family: Talpidae
- Genus: Parascalops
- Species: †P. grayensis

Binomial name
- †Parascalops grayensis Oberg & Samuels, 2022

Extinct species of mammal

Parascalops grayensis is an extinct species of Parascalops that inhabited Tennessee during the Pliocene epoch.
