= Jobancetus =

Jobancetus Temporal range: Burdigalian

Scientific classification
- Kingdom: Animalia
- Phylum: Chordata
- Class: Mammalia
- Order: Artiodactyla
- Infraorder: Cetacea
- Genus: †Jobancetus; Kimura et al., 2022
- Species: †J. pacificus

Binomial name
- †Jobancetus pacificus Kimura et al., 2022

Extinct genus of mammals

Jobancetus is an extinct genus of baleen whale that inhabited the Pacific Ocean off the coast of Japan during the Burdigalian stage of the Miocene epoch. It is known from a single species, Jobancetus pacificus.
