= Rododelphis =

Rododelphis Temporal range: Early Pleistocene

Scientific classification
- Kingdom: Animalia
- Phylum: Chordata
- Class: Mammalia
- Order: Artiodactyla
- Infraorder: Cetacea
- Family: Delphinidae
- Genus: †Rododelphis
- Species: †R. stamatiadisi

Binomial name
- †Rododelphis stamatiadisi Bianucci et al., 2022

Extinct genus of mammals

Rododelphis is an extinct genus of cetacean that inhabited the Mediterranean Sea during the Early Pleistocene. It contains a single species, R. stamatiadisi.
