= Persufflatius =

Persufflatius Temporal range: Late Miocene

Scientific classification
- Kingdom: Animalia
- Phylum: Chordata
- Class: Mammalia
- Order: Artiodactyla
- Infraorder: Cetacea
- Genus: †Persufflatius; Bosselaers & Munstermann, 2022
- Species: †P. renefraaijeni

Binomial name
- †Persufflatius renefraaijeni Bosselaers & Munstermann, 2022

Extinct genus of whales

Persufflatius is an extinct genus of balaenomorph whale that inhabited the North Sea during the Late Miocene. It contains a single species, P. renefraaijeri.
