= Linxiatragus =

Linxiatragus Temporal range: Late Miocene

Scientific classification
- Kingdom: Animalia
- Phylum: Chordata
- Class: Mammalia
- Infraclass: Placentalia
- Order: Artiodactyla
- Family: Bovidae
- Subfamily: Antilopinae
- Tribe: Nesotragini
- Genus: †Linxiatragus
- Species: †L. dengi

Binomial name
- †Linxiatragus dengi Wang et al., 2023

Extinct genus of antelopes

Linxiatragus is an extinct genus of nesotragin antelope that inhabited China during the Miocene epoch.
