= Sonidolestes =

Sonidolestes Temporal range: Early Miocene

Scientific classification
- Kingdom: Animalia
- Phylum: Chordata
- Class: Mammalia
- Infraclass: Placentalia
- Order: Eulipotyphla
- Family: Erinaceidae
- Subfamily: Erinaceinae
- Genus: †Sonidolestes
- Species: †S. wendusui

Binomial name
- †Sonidolestes wendusui Li et al., 2024

Extinct genus of hedgehogs

Sonidolestes is an extinct genus of erinaceine that lived during the Early Miocene. It contains the single species Sonidolestes wendusui.

== Distribution ==
Sonidolestes wendusui is known from fossils found in Inner Mongolia, China.
