= Neochorlakkia =

Neochorlakkia Temporal range: Middle Eocene

Scientific classification
- Kingdom: Animalia
- Phylum: Chordata
- Class: Mammalia
- Infraclass: Placentalia
- Order: Artiodactyla
- Family: †Dichobunidae
- Genus: †Neochorlakkia
- Species: †N. myaingensis

Binomial name
- †Neochorlakkia myaingensis Ducrocq et al., 2022

Extinct genus of mammals

Neochorlakkia is an extinct genus of dichobunid artiodactyl that inhabited Myanmar during the Eocene epoch. It contains a single species, N. myaingensis.
