= Ishimosorex =

Ishimosorex Temporal range: Late Miocene

Scientific classification
- Kingdom: Animalia
- Phylum: Chordata
- Class: Mammalia
- Infraclass: Placentalia
- Order: Eulipotyphla
- Family: Soricidae
- Genus: †Ishimosorex
- Species: †I. ishimiensis

Binomial name
- †Ishimosorex ishimiensis Zazhigin and Voyta, 2022

Extinct genus of shrew

Ishimosorex is an extinct genus of anourosoricin shrew that lived in Kazakhstan during the Late Miocene subepoch of the Miocene epoch.

== Description ==
Ishimosorex ishimiensis is distinguished from Paranourosorex by its first upper incisor having a relatively short root, a deep notch, and a long crown. The lingual and buccal sides of its first maxillary molar are equal in length, and I. ishimiensis is characterised by a deeper posterior emargination of the first maxillary molar relative to Paranourosorex. Additionally, I. ishimiensis exhibits a more posterior protrusion of the hypoconal flange relative to the position of the hypocone as compared to Paranourosorex.
