= Mus kerati =

Mus kerati Temporal range: Middle Pleistocene

Scientific classification
- Kingdom: Animalia
- Phylum: Chordata
- Class: Mammalia
- Order: Rodentia
- Family: Muridae
- Genus: Mus
- Species: †M. kerati

Binomial name
- †Mus kerati Stoetzel & Pickford, 2022

Extinct species of mouse

Mus kerati is an extinct species of Mus that inhabited Algeria in the Middle Pleistocene.
