= Vucetichimys =

Vucetichimys Temporal range: Rupelian

Scientific classification
- Kingdom: Animalia
- Phylum: Chordata
- Class: Mammalia
- Infraclass: Placentalia
- Order: Rodentia
- Parvorder: Caviomorpha
- Genus: †Vucetichimys; Arnal et al., 2022
- Species: †V. pretrilophodoncia

Binomial name
- †Vucetichimys pretrilophodoncia Arnal et al., 2022

Extinct genus of rodents

Vucetichimys is an extinct genus of caviomorph rodent that lived during the Rupelian stage of the Oligocene epoch.

== Distribution ==
Vucetichimys pretrilophodoncia is known from the Santa Rosa fossil site in Peru.
