= Termination (geomorphology) =

Transition period from full glacial to full interglacial climates in the glacial cycle

Termination, as used by Quaternary geologists, oceanographers, and paleoclimatologists is the period of time during a glacial cycle when there is a relatively rapid transition from full glacial climates to full interglacial climates. For the Quaternary period, terminations are numbered using Roman numerals from the most recent termination as “I” and with increasing value, e.g. “II”, “III”, and so forth, into the past. Termination I, also known as the Last Glacial Termination, is the end of Marine isotope stage 2; Termination II is the end of Marine Isotope Stage 6; Termination III is the end of Marine Isotope Stage 8; Termination IV is the end of Marine Isotope Stage 10, and so forth.

During the Quaternary, global climate experienced a recurring pattern of ice-sheet growth and decay. The length of Late Quaternary cycles varied between 80,000 and 120,000 years, with an average recurrence interval of about 100,000 years. The typical Late Quaternary glacial cycle was asymmetric having a long cooling interval that was characterized by an oscillating buildup of ice sheets to maximum volume. The long cooling interval was then followed by a relatively short warming period. During this warming period, called a termination, huge Northern Hemisphere ice sheets melted away; sea level rose about 120 meters (390 ft); and interglacial climate emerged across the planet in a few thousand years. In case of the termination of the last glacial cycle, the retreat of continental ice sheets in the Northern Hemisphere began about 20,000 calendar years ago. By about 7,000 calendar years ago, a small ice cap on Baffin Island was all that was left of the great Laurentide Ice Sheet that had once covered northern North America. In Antarctica, the last termination began about 18,000 years ago and interglacial climate was attained close to 11,000 years ago.
