= Chlorocebus ngedere =

Chlorocebus ngedere Temporal range: Early Pleistocene

Scientific classification
- Kingdom: Animalia
- Phylum: Chordata
- Class: Mammalia
- Infraclass: Placentalia
- Order: Primates
- Family: Cercopithecidae
- Genus: Chlorocebus
- Species: †C. ngedere

Binomial name
- †Chlorocebus ngedere Arenson et al., 2022

Extinct species of monkey

Chlorocebus ngedere is an extinct species of Chlorocebus: an Old World monkey that inhabited Tanzania during the Early Pleistocene Epoch.
