= Aragonictis =

Aragonictis Temporal range: Middle Miocene

Scientific classification
- Kingdom: Animalia
- Phylum: Chordata
- Class: Mammalia
- Infraclass: Placentalia
- Order: Carnivora
- Family: Mustelidae
- Genus: †Aragonictis
- Species: †A. araid

Binomial name
- †Aragonictis araid Valenciano et al., 2021

Aragonictis is an extinct genus of mustelid carnivoran that lived during the Middle Miocene.

== Distribution ==
Aragonictis araid is known from fossils found in Spain.
