= Akhshtyrskaya Cave =

Cave and archaeological site in Russia

- Big Kazachebrodskaya Cave
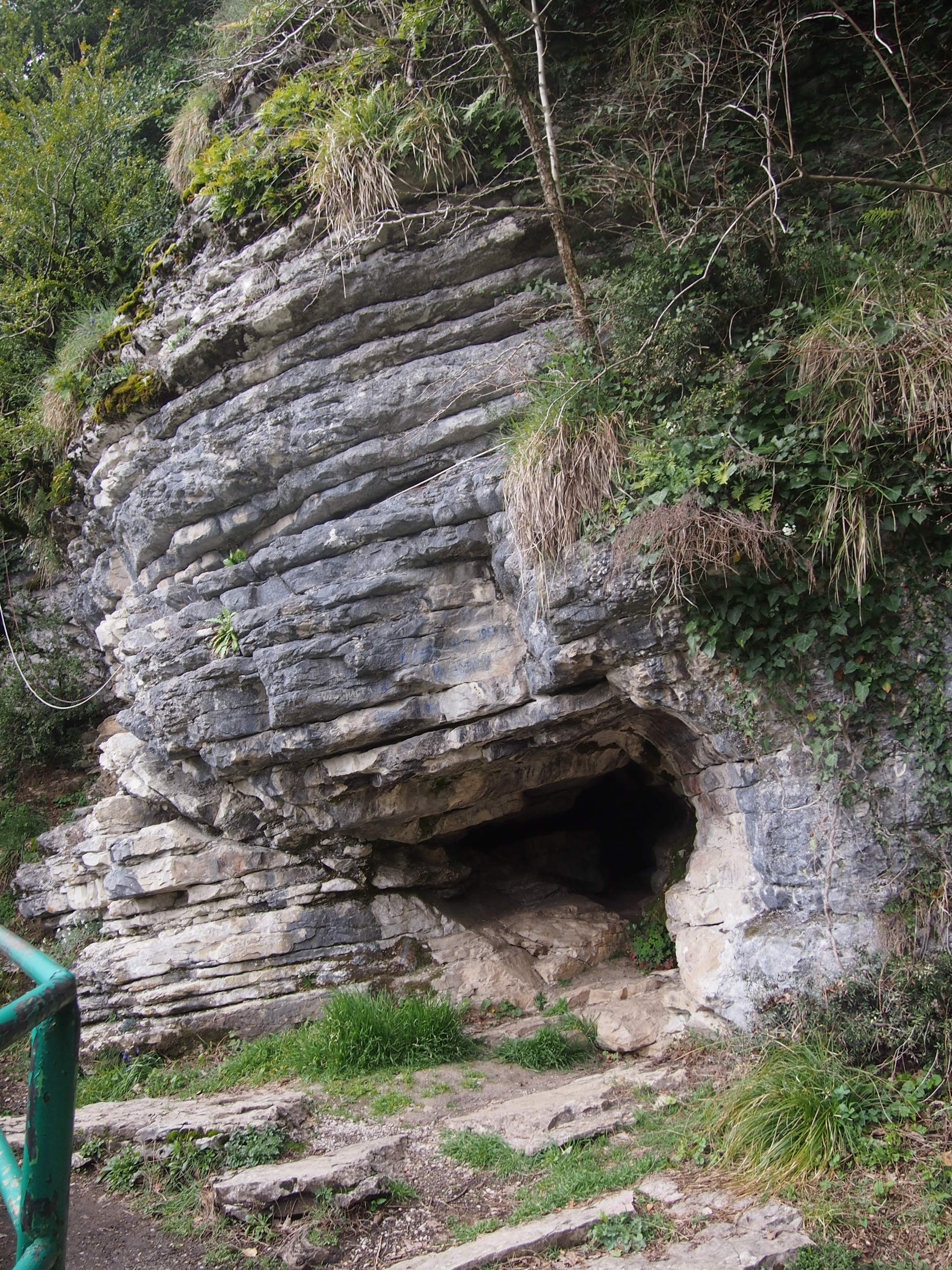
- Entrance to the cave

- Location within Krasnodar Krai Location within Russia
- Location: Kazachy Brod, Krasnodar Krai, Russia
- Coordinates: 43.5197°N 39.977397°E
- Depth: 160 m (520 ft)
- Geology: limestone, corrosion-erosion

The Akhshtyrskaya cave (Big Kazachebrodskaya) is an archeological site in the Western Caucasus. It is located on the right side of Akhshtyrskaya gorge of the Mzymta River near the Adlersky City District of Sochi, Krasnodar Krai, Russia. It was discovered in September 1903 by Edouard Martel and Gabriel Revinko, a resident of the nearby village of Kazachy Brod. The cave is named after the local village of Akhshtyr and the alternative name after the village of Kazachy Brod.

== Description ==
The cave entrance is located about 120 m (390 ft) above the Mzymta River (185 m (607 ft) above sea level) with an eastern exposure. It extends 160 m (520 ft) deep into the rock, first forming a 20 m (66 ft) corridor and then splits into two halls, 10 m (33 ft) and 8 m (26 ft) wide. Further on there is a sharp rise of clay, and two narrow courses coming to a dead end. Near the cave entrance there are two areas connected by a 12 m (39 ft) long corridor.

The cave received the status of "a unique monument of prehistoric architecture". In 1978 the entrance to the cave was closed and the hallway blocked by iron bars. In 1999 the cave became accessible to the public and is equipped with artificial lighting, stairs and steps.

== Discovery and excavations ==
The Akhshtyrskaya Cave was discovered in September 1903 by Édouard-Alfred Martel and Gabriel Revinko, a resident of the nearby village of Kazachy Brod. In 1936, archaeologist Sergei Nikolayevich Zamyatin excavated the first prehistoric human remains. From 1961 to 1965 excavations resumed by archaeologists MZ Panichkina and EA Vekilova. The stratigraphic sequence is about 5 meters thick and ranges from the Middle Paleolithic era to the Early Middle Ages. More recent excavations occurred from 1999 until 2008. In total, more than 6,000 bones were found - 92% of which belonged to the cave bear. In addition, there are the remains of deer, bison, goats, wolves, foxes and other animals. Humans - Neanderthals settled in the cave about 70,000 years ago. After a break of about 20,000 years the cave was populated by Cro-Magnon humans between 30,000 and 35,000 years ago.

== Results ==
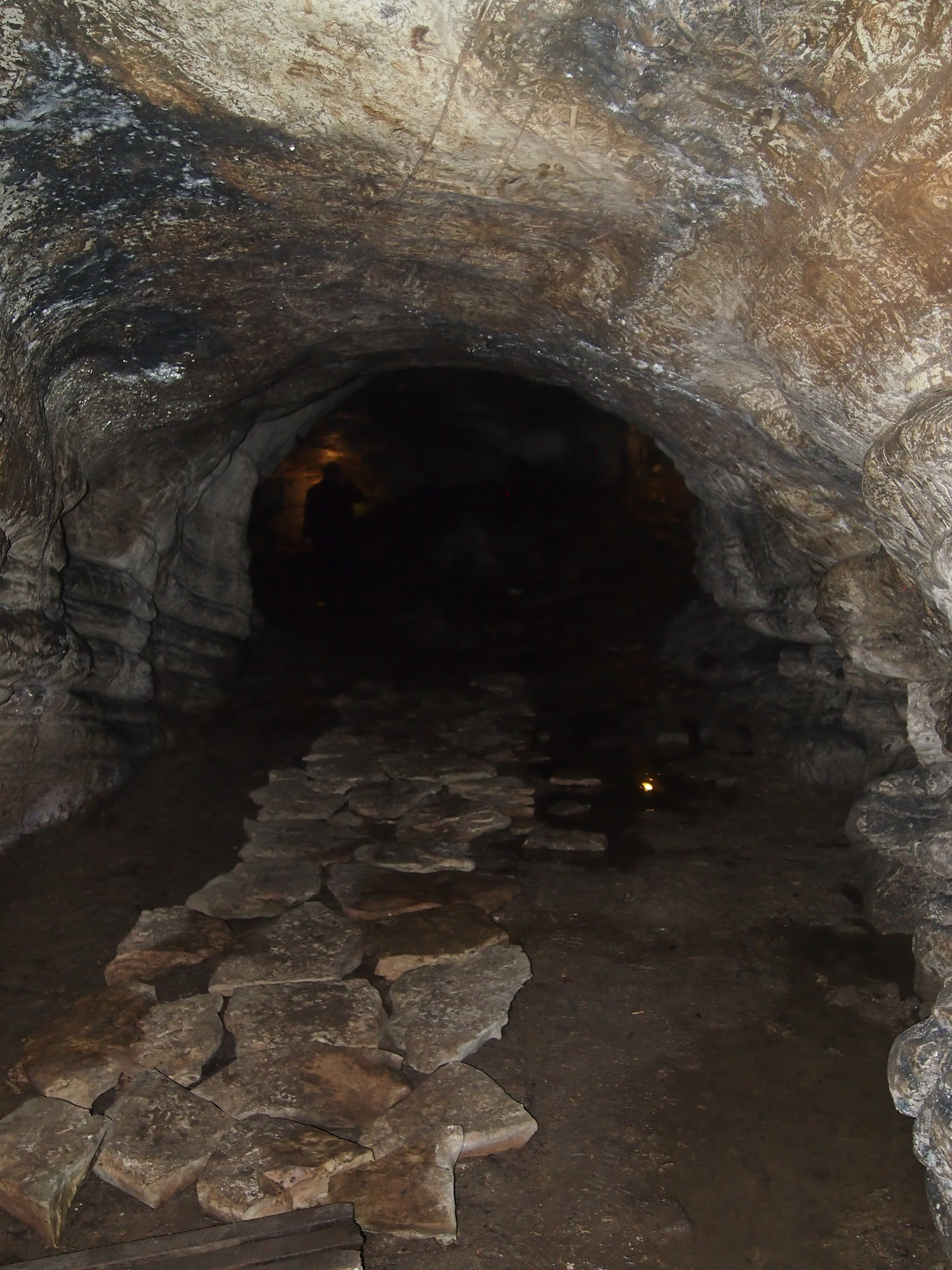
Entrance interior

Layer Dating: Layer 3/1: 40,000 yrs BC; Layer 4/1: 70,000 yrs BC; Layer 4/2: 80,000 yrs BC; Layer 5/1: 112,000 yrs BC; Layer 5/2: 200,000 yrs BC; Layer 6/1: 250,000 yrs BC; Layer 6/2: 270,000 yrs BC; Layer 7: 300,000 yrs BC; Layer 8: 300,000 yrs BC; Layer 9: 350,000 BC

=== Description and findings ===
Finding (2005): Mandible of cave bear; hip bone of cave bear; radius; humerus; cervical vertebrae; rib; vertebrae; lumbar vertebrae; thoracic vertebrae

Excavation (2005): Level 3 M Mousterian. This level is associated with Neanderthal culture at about 40,000 BC. Some cave bear relics were found. Black spots inside the levels of the cave may be the result of fire usage for cooking and warming. Scientists also found tools: knives, spears and axes.

Section (2005): Rock bottom of the cave. Starting about 350,000 years ago. Layer 9: 350,000 BC; Layer 8: 350,000-300,000 BC; The cave was not habitable and was filled with water. Layer 6/2, 6/1: About 250,000 years BC. Tools were found showing Neanderthal habitation; Layer 5/2, 5/1: 112,000 years BC. First level of long-term habitation of Neanderthal people. Layer: 4/2, 4/1: 70,000 years BC. Second level of long-term habitation of Neanderthal people. Layer 3: 40,000 years BC. Late Paleolithic. Stone object of possible Cro-Magnon culture.

== Gallery ==
Photographs of the cave and immediate area

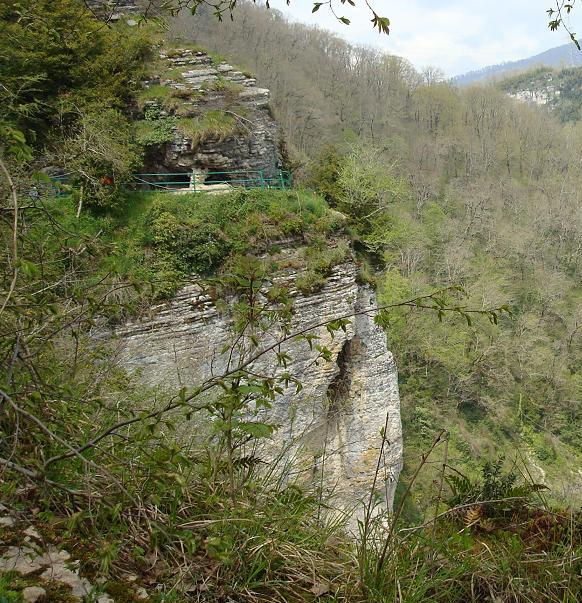

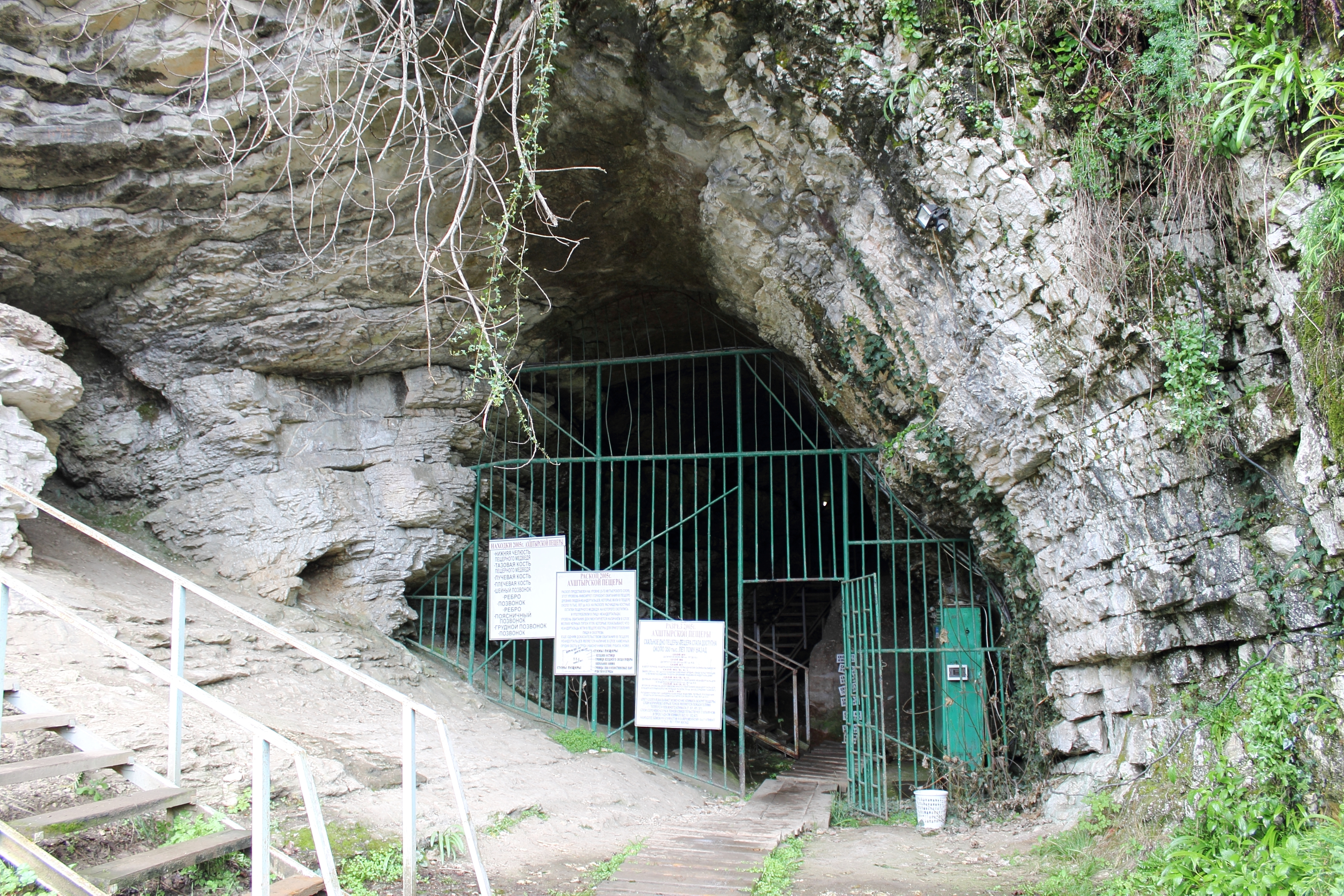

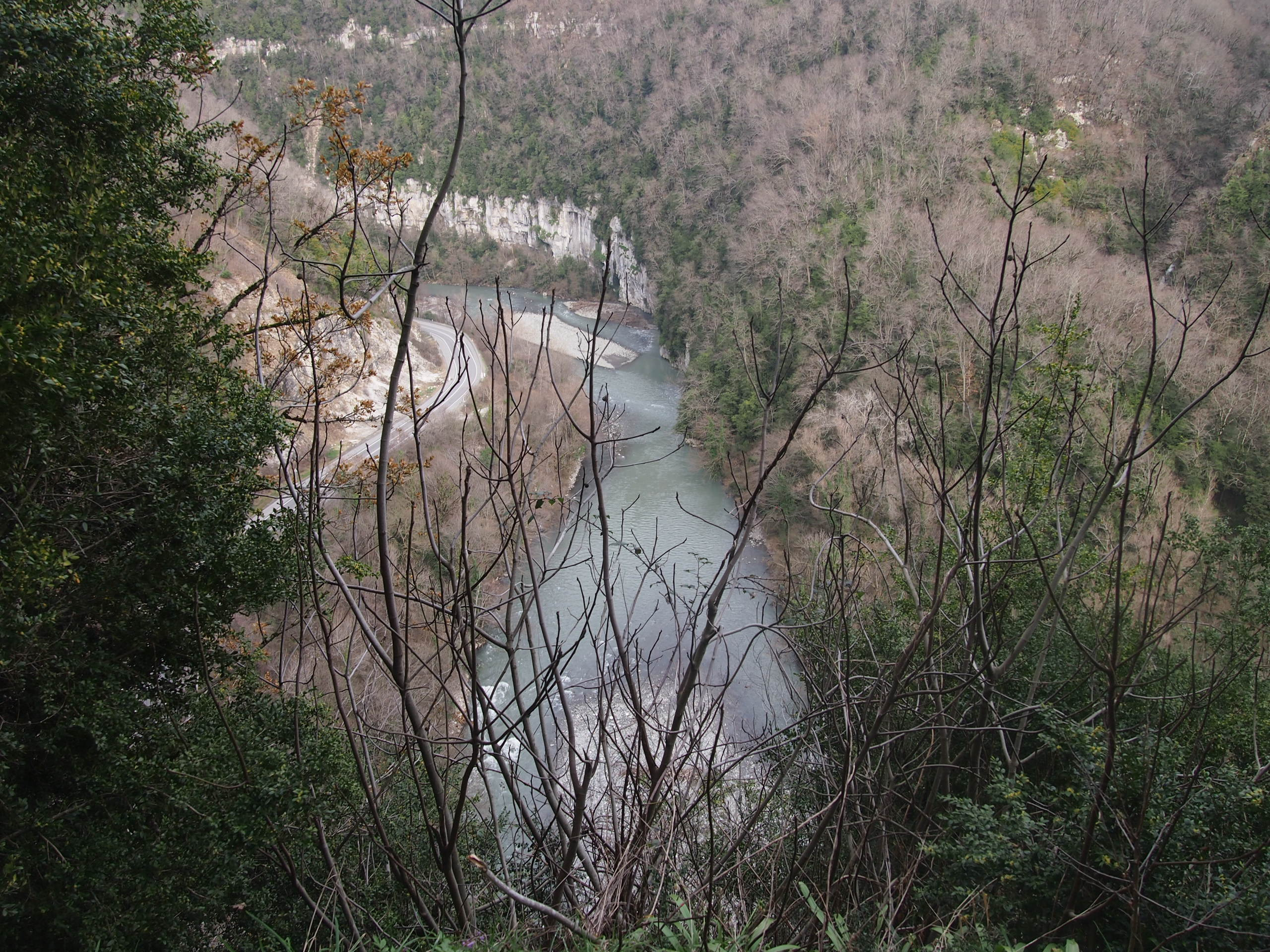

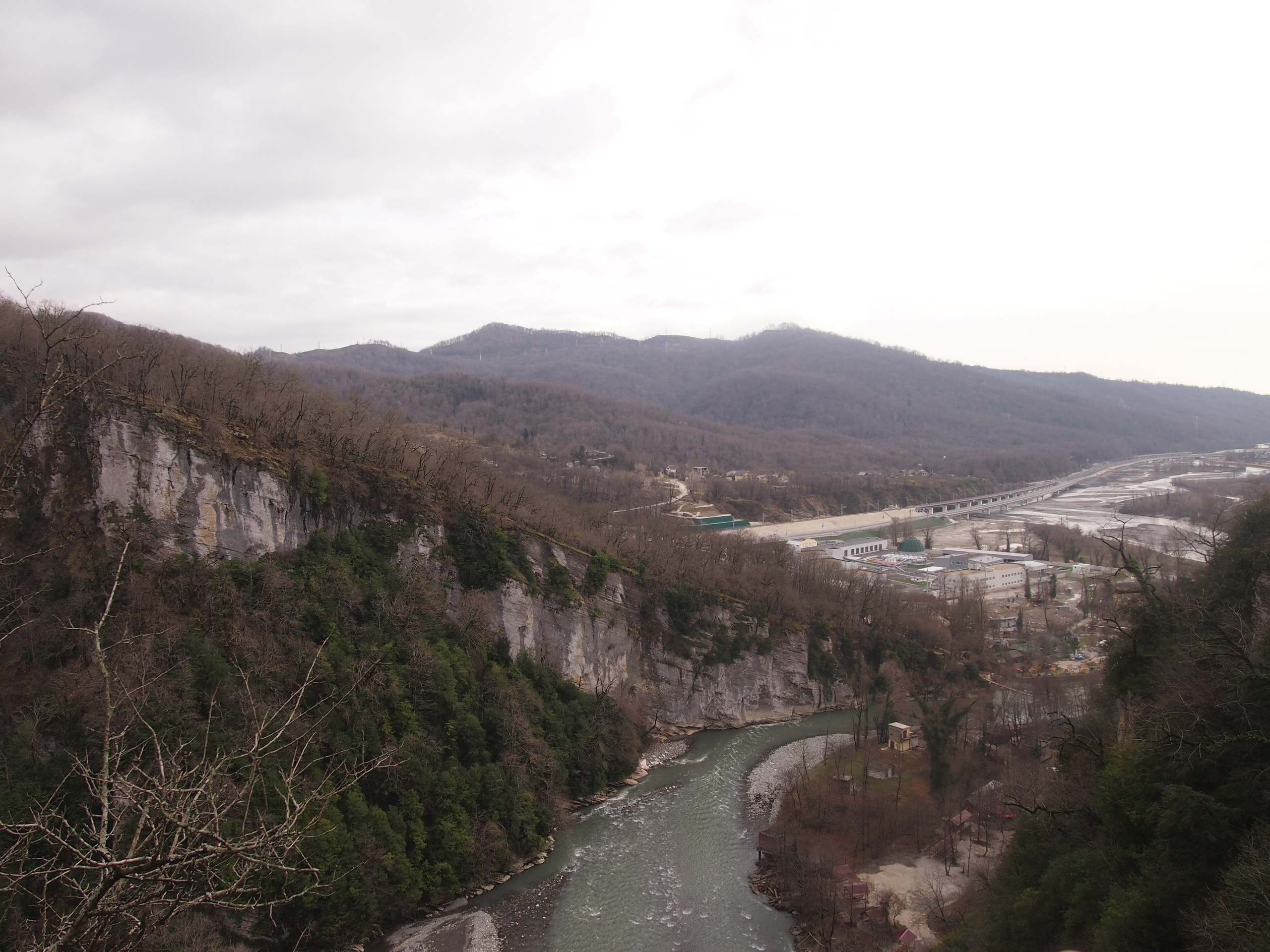

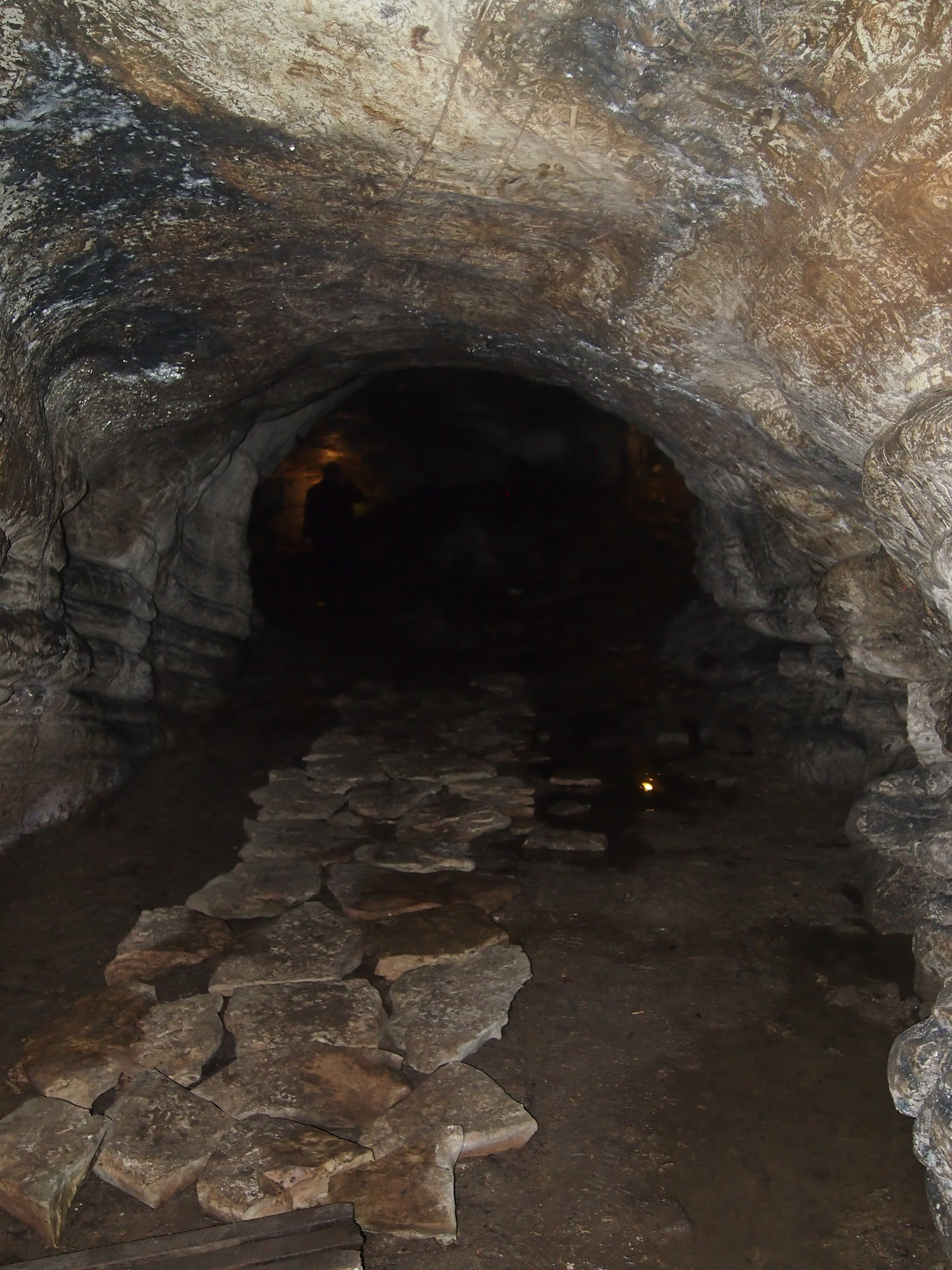

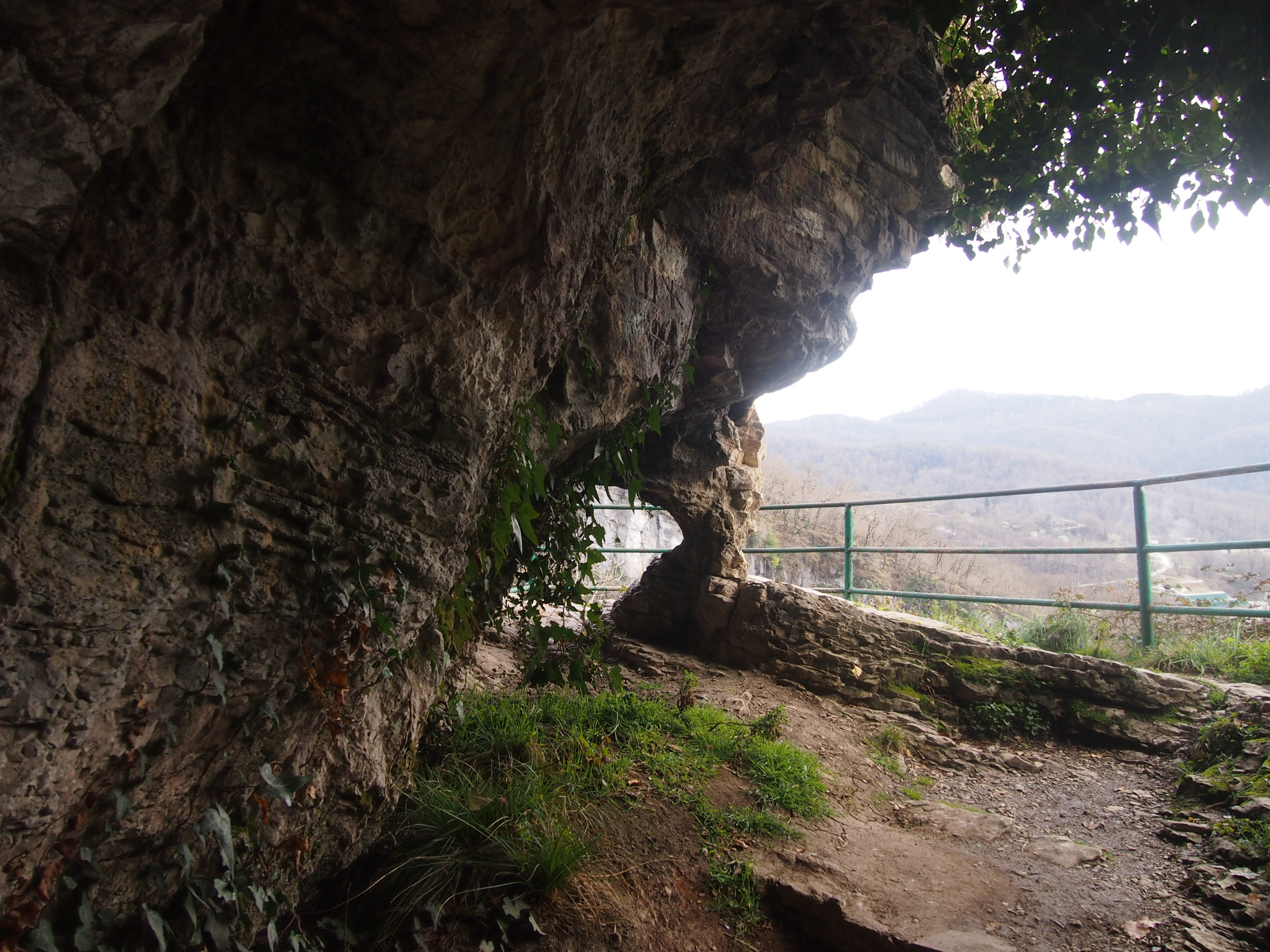

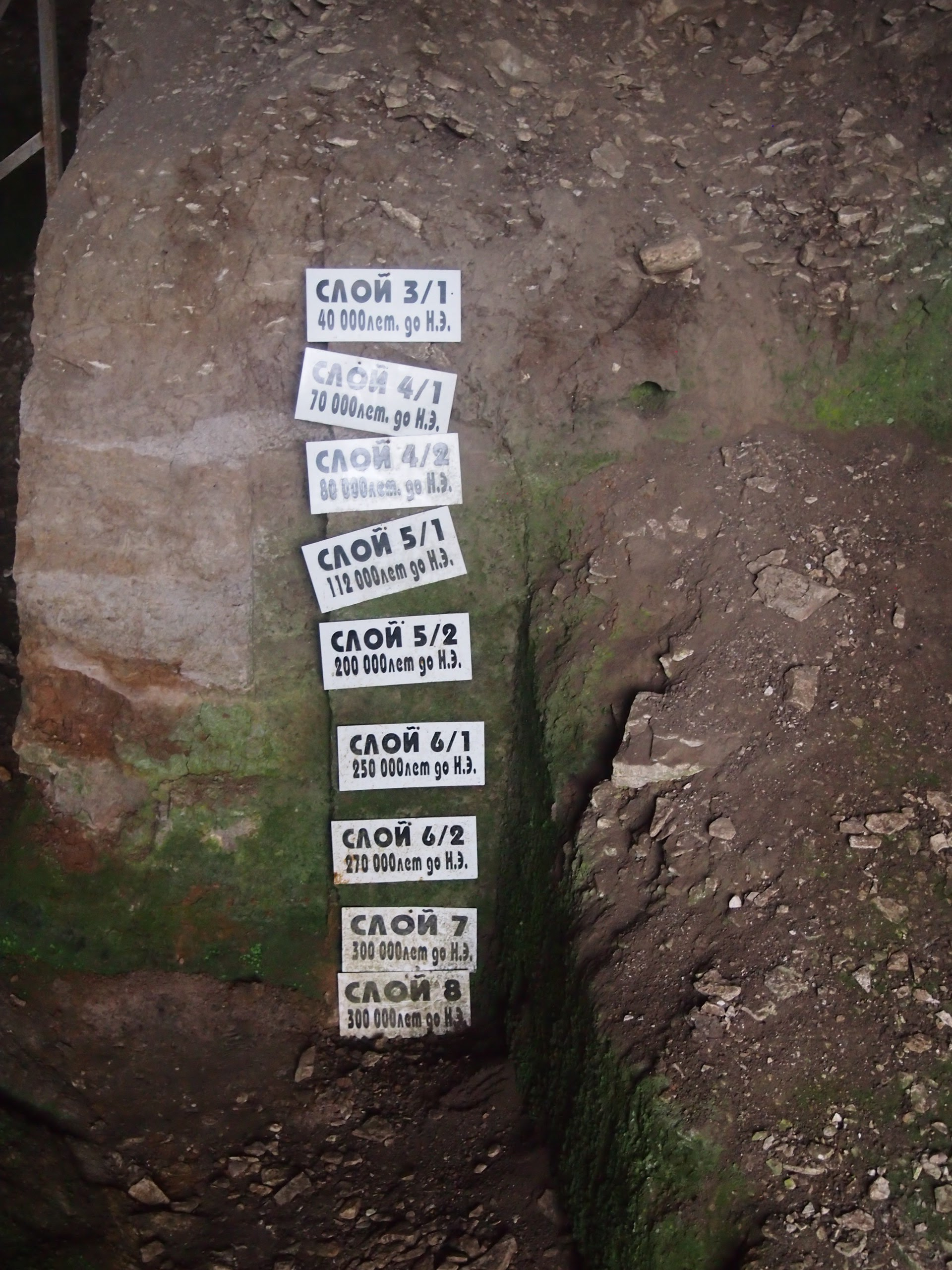
