= Moralesictis =

Moralesictis Temporal range: Neogene

Scientific classification
- Domain: Eukaryota
- Kingdom: Animalia
- Phylum: Chordata
- Class: Mammalia
- Order: Carnivora
- Family: Mustelidae
- Subfamily: Mellivorinae
- Genus: †Moralesictis; Valenciano & Baskin, 2022
- Species: †M. intrepidus

Binomial name
- †Moralesictis intrepidus Valenciano & Baskin, 2022

Extinct genus of mammals

Moralesictis is an extinct genus of mustelid that inhabited Texas during the Neogene period. It is a monotypic genus known from a single species, M. intrepidus.
