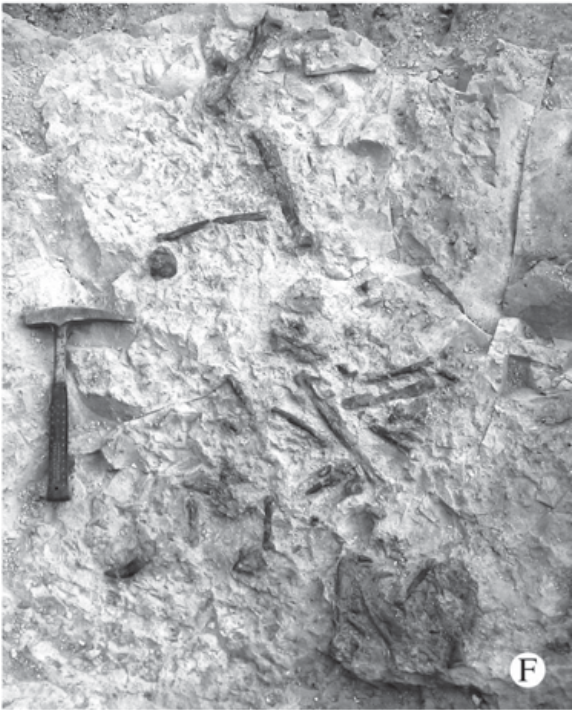
- Fortunictis sp. skeletal material from Venta del Moro, Valencia.

Scientific classification
- Kingdom: Animalia
- Phylum: Chordata
- Class: Mammalia
- Order: Carnivora
- Family: Felidae
- Subfamily: †Machairodontinae
- Tribe: †Metailurini
- Genus: †Fortunictis; Pons-Moyà, 1987

Type species
- Fortunictis acerensis Pons-Moyà, 1987

= Fortunictis =

Fortunictis Temporal range: Late Miocene

Extinct genus of felid

Fortunictis is a fossil genus of metailurine machairodontine (saber-toothed) felid containing only one species, Fortunictis acerensis. Both the genus and species were described by paleontologist Joan Pons-Moyà in 1987 based on material from Casa del Acero in Spain, which is dated back to the Upper Miocene (approximately 8.7 to 5.332 million years ago).

== Discovery and naming ==
Spanish palaeontologist Joan Pons-Moyà described the genus and species in 1987 based on fossils from Casa del Acero in Spain.

The generic name Fortunictis is a combination of fortuna and ictis meaning "wild cat". The specific epithet acerensis meaning "from Casa del Acera", the type locality.

Further material assigned to Fortunictis was discovered at Venta del Moro in 2004.

== Description ==
Pons-Moyà described the species' diagnostic characteristics as: curved, highly laterally compressed upper canine teeth; elongated crown and no mesial cusp on the third premolar; high, transversely compressed cusps on the fourth premolar and lower; and a highly compressed first molar with a long talonid with a hypoconid cusp, but lacking the metaconid cusp.

A later study further noted that F. acerensis was a highly derived metailurine with a relatively slender mandible. It further described the upper canine teeth as more flattened, the upper and lower third premolars as very elongated, and both the third and fourth premolars as well as the first molar all narrower than the related Metailurus major.

In 2001, the measurements of teeth from Fortunictis were used in comparison to Metailurus major along with Stenailurus telihardi and Paramachairodus orientalis. Only the upper dentation was mentioned. The canine teeth of Fortunictis had a length of 17.9 mm and a width of 8.9 mm. The P3 had lengths of 19.7 mm and 19.9 mm and widths of 9.0 mm and 8.7 mm. The P4 only had one length measurement at 30.8 mm and two width measurements at 14.3 mm and 14.2 mm. No measurements for M1 teeth were mentioned.

A 2014 study of the species Yoshi minor and Yoshi garevskii describe the measurements of multiple metailurine teeth, including Fortunictis. The length of the canines of Fortunictis were described as being >52 mm in height, and a mesiodistal diameter (front to back in felids) of 17.9 mm. Which was noted to be much larger than the canines of Yoshi garevskii and comparable to those of Metailurus major and Stenailurus telihardi.

In a 2018 description of the small machairodont species Tchadailurus adei, it is mentioned that Fortunictis is far larger, (50%) than the holotype specimen of Tchadailurus, TM 112-00-99.

== Classification ==
Fortunictis was assigned to the tribe Metailurini in the subfamily Machairodontinae in its original description.

A cladogram of the Metailurini from a 2018 phylogenetic analysis:

- Metailurini
  - Fortunictis acerensis
  - Adelphailurus kansensis
  - Stenailurus teilhardi
  - - Metailurus mongoliensis
    - Metailurus hengduanshanensis
    - Metailurus obscurus
    - Metailurus major
    - - Yoshi minor
      - Yoshi garevskii
  - Dinofelis
