= Stenailurus =

Stenailurus Temporal range: Late Miocene (Turolian)

Scientific classification
- Kingdom: Animalia
- Phylum: Chordata
- Class: Mammalia
- Order: Carnivora
- Family: Felidae
- Subfamily: †Machairodontinae
- Tribe: †Metailurini
- Genus: †Stenailurus; Crusafont-Pairo & Aguirre, 1972

Type species
- Stenailurus teilhardi Crusafont-Pairo & Aguirre, 1972

Extinct genus of carnivores

Stenailurus is an extinct genus of metailurin machairodontine (saber-toothed) cat from the Late Miocene (the Turolian, specifically) of Spain. It contains a single species, Stenailurus teilhardi . It was described based on a piece of maxilla in 1972.

== Discovery and naming ==
The generic name Stenailurus honors Bl. Niels Steensen, considered the father of paleontology, combined with the Greek αἴλουρος/ailurus meaning "cat". The specific name teilhardi honors paleontologist Pierre Teilhard de Chardin.

== Description ==
Stenailurus shows basal features of machairodonts such as the presence of a P2 tooth.

In 2014, a study describing the genus Yoshi compares the morphology of teeth from multiple metailurines. Among these, the measurements of the canine teeth of Stenailurus were recorded as having a length of 44.4 mm and a mesiodistal diameter of 17 mm. This is mentioned to be comparable to the genera Fortunictis acerensis and Metailurus major.

== Classification ==
Position of Stenailurus in Metailurini according to a 2018 phylogenetic analysis:

- Metailurini
  - Fortunictis acerensis
  - Adelphailurus kansensis
  - Stenailurus teilhardi
  - - Metailurus mongoliensis
    - Metailurus hengduanshanensis
    - Metailurus obscurus
    - Metailurus major
    - - Yoshi minor
      - Yoshi garevskii
  - Dinofelis
