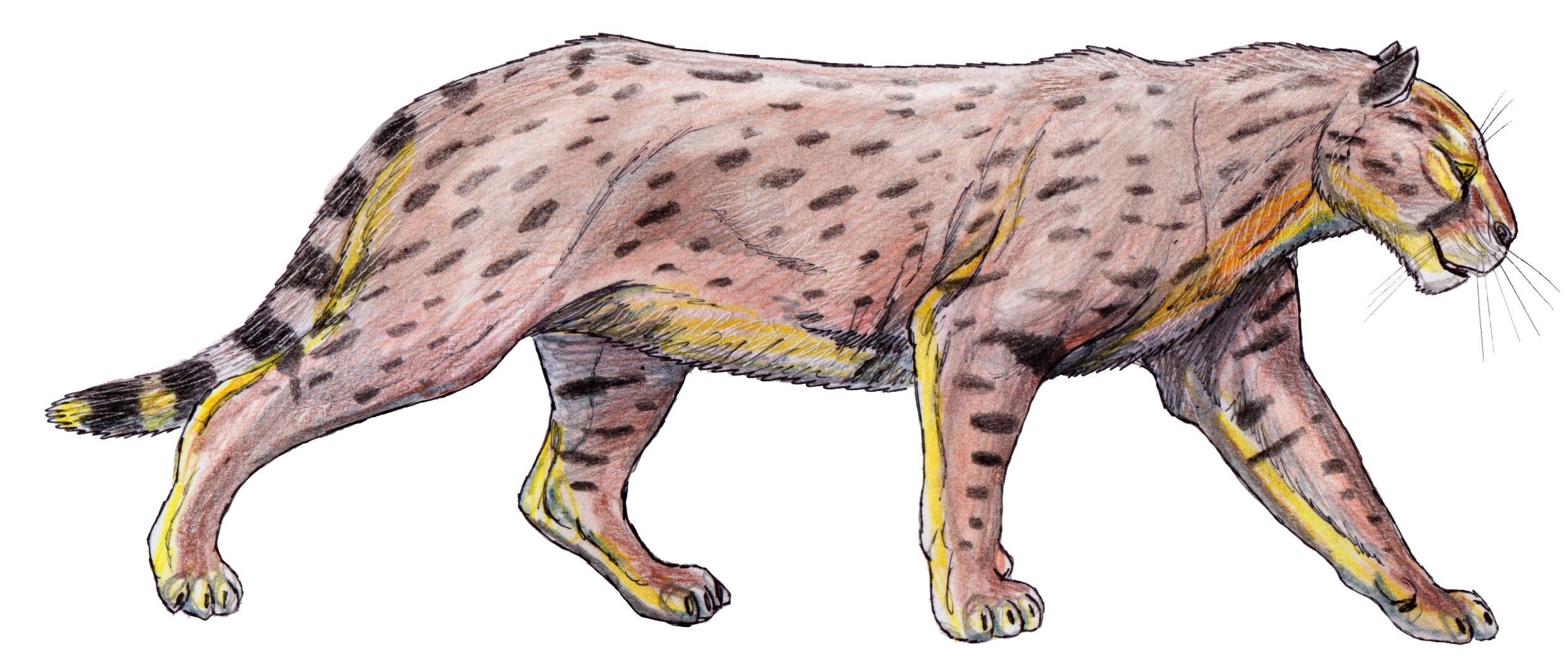
- Restoration of D. barlowi

Scientific classification
- Kingdom: Animalia
- Phylum: Chordata
- Class: Mammalia
- Order: Carnivora
- Family: Felidae
- Subfamily: †Machairodontinae
- Tribe: †Metailurini
- Genus: †Dinofelis; Zdansky, 1924

Type species
- Dinofelis cristata (Falconer & Cautley, 1836)

Other species
- †Dinofelis aronoki Werdelin & Lewis, 2001; †Dinofelis barlowi (Broom, 1937); †Dinofelis darti (Toerien, 1955); †Dinofelis diastemata (Astre, 1929); †Dinofelis paleoonca (Meade, 1945); †Dinofelis petteri Werdelin & Lewis, 2001; †Dinofelis piveteaui (Ewer, 1955); †Dinofelis werdelini Jiangzuo et al., 2023

Synonyms
- Dinofelis: Therailurus; D. cristata: Felis cristata Falconer & Cautley, 1836; Felis grandicristata Bose, 1880; Uncia cristata Cope, 1880; Uncia grandicristata Cope, 1880; Felis paleotigris Falconer, 1868; Uncia grandicristata Cope, 1880; Tigris cristata Kretzoi, 1929; Panthera cristata Pilgrim, 1933; Dinofelis abeli Zdansky, 1924; D. diastemata: Felis diastemata Astre, 1929; Therailurus diastemata Piveteau, 1948

= Dinofelis =

Dinofelis Temporal range: Late Miocene to Early Pleistocene (Tortonian to Calabrian) 7–1.4 Ma

Extinct genus of carnivores

Dinofelis is an extinct genus of machairodontine (sabre-toothed cat), usually classified in the tribe Metailurini. It was widespread in Europe, Asia, Africa and North America from 7 million to about 1.4 million years ago (Late Miocene to Early Pleistocene). Fossils very similar to Dinofelis from Lothagam range back to around 8 million years ago, in the Late Miocene.

== Discovery and naming ==
The first fossil of Dinofelis cristata, a nearly complete skull, was discovered by the collecters that were employed by Walter Ewer, under the direction of Captain Proby Cautley. The specimen was recovered at the foot of a sandstone cliff of the Sivalik Hills, most likely in the northern Doab region of northern India. The species name cristata is likely after the sagittal crest present in the cranium.

The genus Dinofelis was originally named by Otto Zdansky in 1924 for the species Dinofelis abeli.

Further fossil species were named, including Felis diastemata and Meganthereon barlowi, which were later transferred to the genus Therailurus, which was in turn later considered a junior synonym of Dinofelis.

A comprehensive review of the genus was published in 2001 by paleontologists Lars Werdelin and Margaret E. Lewis, including mentions of the then-unnamed Langebaanweg and Lothagam species, as well as naming a new species Dinofelis aronoki; the species epithet came from the phrase arono ki which, in the language of the people of eastern Turkana, means "it was terrible". The review also noted six different sets of remains that were referable to Dinofelis but were too fragmentary to assign to any one species.

Another unnamed (again, due to fragmentary material) species was described in 2021, based on fossils from a Plio-Pleistocene site in Northern Africa.

In 2023, the Langebaanweg species was described as Dinofelis werdelini; the specific epithet honored Lars Werdelin. It assigned a holotype, paratype, and nine other specimens of fragmentary cranial material (some of which had previously been referred to other species) to the newly-named species.

== Description ==
This genus varied in size, with a similar range of sizes to Panthera. In one study, the body mass of Dinofelis was estimated at 149 kg (330 lb), though species with similar dimensions to large lynx or small pumas also existed. The species Dinofelis cristata is considered to be intermediate between Jaguar and the large Bengal tiger specimen from Saharanpur.

The canine teeth of Dinofelis are longer and more flattened than those of modern cats but less than those of other saber-tooths. While the lower canines are robust, the cheek teeth are not as robust as those of most modern big cats.

Dinofelis werdelini was a medium-sized machairodontine, about the size of a large jaguar, with robust upper canines and relatively small cheek teeth.

== Classification ==
The phylogenetic status of Dinofelis within Machairodontinae has been difficult to ascertain historically, and various positions within Felidae have been proposed for the genus. It has commonly been recovered as belonging to the tribe Metailurini, although one recent analysis contested the monophyly of Metailurini, placing Dinofelis as a sister taxon to Rhizosmilodon.

A number of species are currently accepted in the genus:

- Dinofelis aronoki: It lived in the Villafranchian and Biharian stage in Kenya and Ethiopia. Recently split from D. barlowi, it is the largest known species of Dinofelis.
- Dinofelis barlowi: It lived from the late Pliocene to the early Pleistocene. Geographically, found in Europe and Asia but mainly in Africa. It was 70 cm high, probably the smallest species of Dinofelis.
- Dinofelis cristata: Known from both India and China, this species is especially convergent with the genus Panthera in its skull and particularly canine morphology, suggesting more pantherine-like hunting behaviour than other machairodonts. The holotype was discovered in Sivalik Hills of India and it was originally identified as a species of the genus Panthera and therefore was named "Panthera cristata". (Includes D. abeli from China.)
- Dinofelis darti: It lived in South Africa during the Villafranchian stage.
- Dinofelis diastemata: This species is known from the early Pliocene of Europe.
- Dinofelis paleoonca: Its type locality is Meade's Quarry 11, which is in a Blancan terrestrial horizon in the Blanco Formation of Texas. It was recombined as Dinofelis palaeoonca by Kurten (1972), Hemmer (1973), Dalquest (1975), Kurten and Anderson (1980), Schultz (1990) and Werdelin and Lewis (2001).
- Dinofelis petteri: Known from the Pliocene of East Africa
- Dinofelis piveteaui: The latest known species of Dinofelis, lived in South Africa during the early Pleistocene. This species has the most pronounced sabertoothed adaptations of the genus.
- Dinofelis werdelini: Known from Langebaanweg in Africa, from the Pliocene.

Additional fossils from Lothagam (specifically the Nawata Formation and the Apak Member of the Nachukui Formation) are considered to represent another, unnamed species; one smaller and more primitive than other known species.

A major review of Dinofelis by Werdelin et al. in 2001 produced a cladogram of its species:

- Dinofelis
  - Dinofelis sp. (Lothagam)
  - - Dinofelis diastemata
    - - Dinofelis cristata
      - - Dinofelis petteri
        - Dinofelis barlowi
      - Dinofelis palaeoonca
    - - Dinofelis aronoki
      - Dinofelis piveteaui

The 2023 paper that named D. werdelini found it to be a sister to a clade formed by D. cristatus, D. petteri, D. piveteaui, and D. barlowi, but did not test it against the rest of the genus.

- Dinofelis
  - Dinofelis werdelini
  - - Dinofelis cristatus
    - - Dinofelis piveteaui
      - - Dinofelis barlowi
        - Dinofelis petteri

Dinofelis' position amongst the Metailurini per a 2018 phylogenetic analysis:

- Metailurini
  - Fortunictis acerensis
  - Adelphailurus kansensis
  - Stenailurus tielhardi
  - - Metailurus mongoliensis
    - Metailurus hengduanshanensis
    - Metailurus obscurus
    - Metailurus major
    - - Yoshi minor
      - Yoshi garevskii
  - Dinofelis
    - Dinofelis diastemata
    - - Dinofelis darti
      - - Dinofelis piveteaui
        - Dinofelis aronoki
      - Dinofelis barlowi
      - Dinofelis petteri
      - Dinofelis paleoonca
      - Dinofelis cristata

== Paleobiology ==
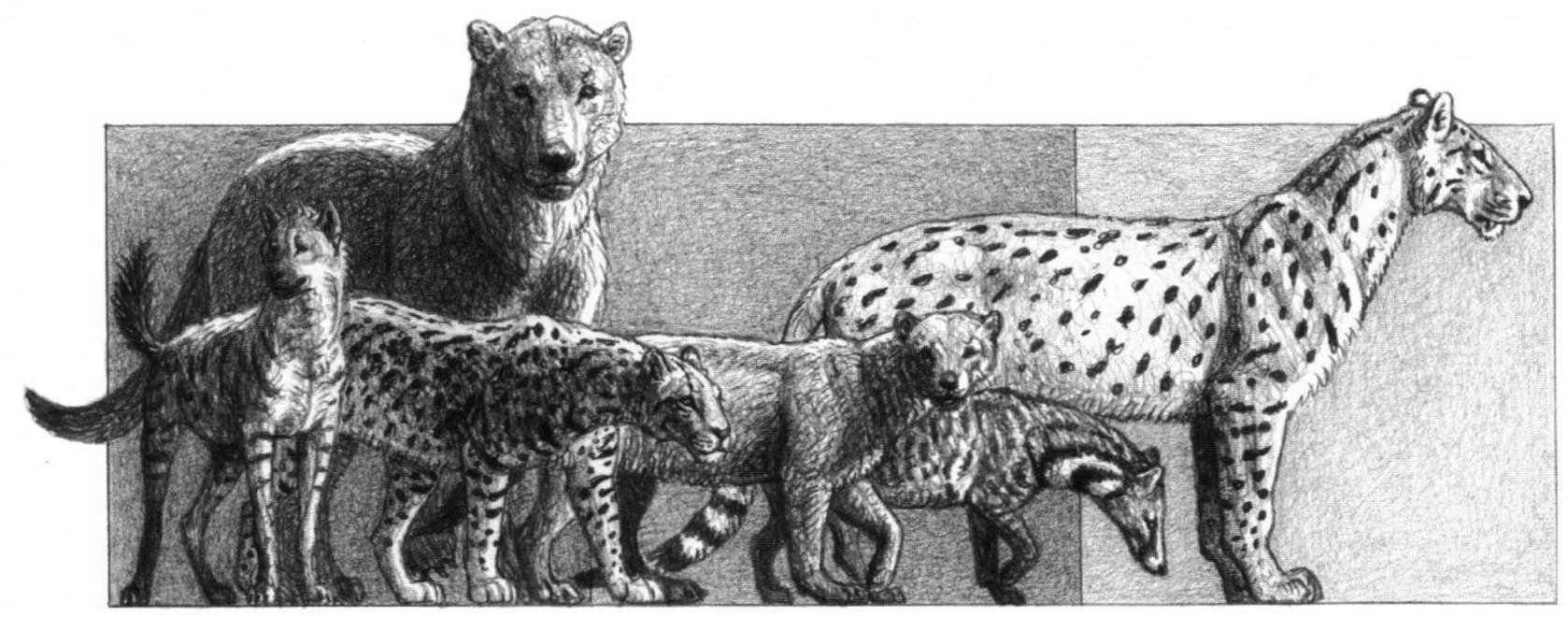
Life restoration of Dinofelis and other Late Miocene African carnivorans

Morphometric analysis of Dinofelis specimens from Olduvai Gorge suggests that the felid was best suited for mixed habitats rather than open grasslands or closed woodlands.

Analysis of carbon isotope ratios in specimens from Swartkrans indicates that Dinofelis preferentially hunted grazing animals. The main predators of hominids in the environment at that time were most likely leopards and fellow machairodont Megantereon, whose carbon isotope ratios showed more indication of preying on hominids.

Several sites from South Africa seem to show Dinofelis may have hunted and killed Australopithecus africanus, since the finds mingle fossilized remains of Dinofelis, hominids, and other large contemporary animals. In South Africa, Dinofelis remains have been found near Paranthropus fossil skulls, a few with precisely spaced canine holes in their crania, so it is possible Dinofelis preyed on robust hominids as well. This may have been rare, however, as carbon isotope ratios contradict this.

It is thought that the gradual disappearance of its forest environment may have contributed to Dinofelis' extinction at the start of the ice age.
