= Miomachairodus =

Miomachairodus Temporal range: Middle Miocene–Late Miocene

Scientific classification
- Kingdom: Animalia
- Phylum: Chordata
- Class: Mammalia
- Order: Carnivora
- Family: Felidae
- Subfamily: †Machairodontinae
- Genus: †Miomachairodus; Schmidt-Kittler, 1976

Type species
- Miomachairodus pseudailuroides Schmidt-Kittler, 1976

Extinct genus of carnivores

Miomachairodus is an extinct genus of large machairodontine (saber-toothed cat) containing only a single species, Miomachairodus pseudailuroides. It is mainly known from Middle Miocene-age fossils in Turkey and persisted until the early Late Miocene (Vallesian). Fossils of this machairodont have been found in the Vallesian-age Bahe Formation in Shaanxi, China, and Yeni Eskihisar in Anatolia. This Turkish site is of Miocene age and is well known for its pollen studies.

== History and naming ==
The genus was first named by paleontologist Norbert Schmidt-Kittler in 1976 based on the holotype, a partial skull from Akçaköy, Eşme District, Turkey, and a second specimen, a lower jaw from Yeni Eskihisar. The generic name Miomachairodus is a combination of Mio, referring to the Miocene when it lived, and Machairodus; the specific name pseudailuroides means "like Pseudaelurus".

In 2022, material from the Guanigou fauna in the Linxia Basin was described as Miomachairodus sp., and the authors suggested that it represented a new species of Miomachairodus. The fossil, a partial maxilla from the early Late Miocene (early Bahean), represented the oldest known machairodontine in Asia. They refrained from definitively naming the species because it lacked the fourth premolar. The fossil material had previously been assigned to Machairodus palanderi in 2013.

== Description ==
The Miomachairodus sp. from the Linxia Basin is known only from a single fossil (HMV2039), a partial maxilla with the first, second, and third incisors, the canine, and the third premolar present, as well as the alveolus of the second premolar and a broken fourth premolar. The incisors are small and the canine tooth has "distinct but small" serrations. It was distinguished from M. pseudailuroides by having a shorter diastema between the canine and third premolar, and in the differing morphology of the third premolar. The describing paper estimated it was a large carnivoran that weighed more than 100 kilograms (220 lb).

== Classification ==
A 2018 phylogenetic analysis recovered Miomachairodus pseudailuroides as basal to most of the rest of Machairodontinae.

- Machairodontinae
  - - - - Homotheriini
        - - Smilodontini
          - Metailurini
      - Miomachairodus pseudailuroides
    - - Diamantofelis ferox
      - Namafelis minor
      - Pseudaelurus spp.
  - Hyperailurictis spp. + Nimravides spp.
