= Adelphailurus =

Adelphailurus Temporal range: 6.8–4.75 Ma

Scientific classification
- Kingdom: Animalia
- Phylum: Chordata
- Class: Mammalia
- Infraclass: Placentalia
- Order: Carnivora
- Family: Felidae
- Subfamily: †Machairodontinae
- Tribe: †Metailurini
- Genus: †Adelphailurus; Hibbard, 1934

Type species
- Adelphailurus kansensis Hibbard, 1934
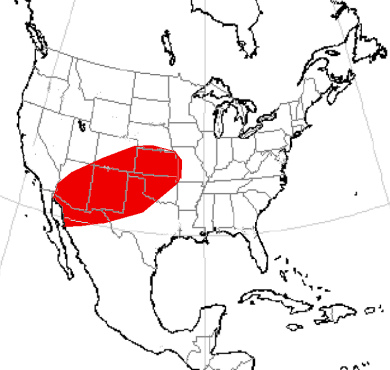
- Range of Adelphailurus based on fossil record

Synonyms
- Metailurus kansensis (Hibbard, 1934) sensu Andersson & Werdelin, 2005

Extinct genus of felid

Adelphailurus is an extinct genus of metailurin machairodontine (saber-toothed) cat that inhabited western North America during the late Miocene and early Pliocene. It is monotypic, containing only the species Adelphailurus kansensis.

== History of discovery ==
The holotype specimen, KUMVP 3462, was collected by H. T. Martin from near the base of the Ogallala Formation in Sherman County, Kansas, in the summer of 1924. It was subsequently stored in the collections at the University of Kansas' Museum of Vertebrate Paleontology. However, it was not described until 1934 when paleontologist Claude W. Hibbard erected the new genus and species Adelphailurus kansensis for the specimen. In 2026, Chatar and Tseng described five new specimens including a complete skull, right lower jaw fragment, and three isolated upper canine teeth.

The genus name is derived from the Greek ἀδελφός/adelphós meaning "brother", and αἴλουρος/ailurus meaning "cat". The specific epithet kansensis means "from Kansas".

== Description ==
The holotype of Adelphailurus kansensis consists of the anterior portion of a skull with nearly perfect dentition on both the maxillaries and premaxillaries. Hibbard stated that the living cat would have a relatively broad skull with large canines.

== Classification ==
Hibbard only assigned the genus to the family Felidae in his original description. It was assigned to the tribe Metailurini in 1983, assigned in passing to Felidae by Carroll in 1988, and to the subfamily Machairodontinae by Martin in 1998.

In 2005, Werdelin and Andersson suggested that Adelphailurus kansensis should be reassigned to the genus Metailurus as Metailurus kansensis, but this was rejected and refuted by Li in 2014 and Spassov & Geraads in 2015.

In 2010 it was suggested that Nimravides hibbardi was a junior synonym of Adelphailurus kansensis.

Position of Adelphailurus in Metailurini according to a 2018 phylogenetic analysis:

- Metailurini
  - Fortunictis acerensis
  - Adelphailurus kansensis
  - Stenailurus teilhardi
  - - Metailurus mongoliensis
    - Metailurus hengduanshanensis
    - Metailurus obscurus
    - Metailurus major
    - - Yoshi minor
      - Yoshi garevskii
  - Dinofelis
