= Bahe Formation =

Geological formation in Shaanxi, China

- Stratigraphic range: Tortonian
- Type: Geological formation
- Underlies: Lantian Formation
- Overlies: Koujiacun Formation
- Thickness: generally >300 m (980 ft)

Lithology
- Primary: Conglomerate, sandstone
- Other: Mudstone, marl

Location
- Coordinates: 33.5°N 109.5°E
- Region: Shaanxi
- Country: China
- Bahe Formation (China)

The Bahe Formation is a Late Miocene (Tortonian/Vallesian/Bahean, about 11.6 to 9.0 mya) geological formation in Shaanxi, China. It has "a complex lithology of predominantly orange-yellow conglomerates, sandstones, tan-yellow sandy mudstones, and tan-red mudstones." The main fossil locality is in the Jiulaopo region on the left bank of the Bahe River in Lantian.

== Geology and environment ==
Six general facies have been identified in the region: (1) massive or crudely bedded conglomerates, (2) cross-stratified conglomerate and sandstone deposits, (3) minor sandstone deposits, (4) fine-grained deposits, (5) gritty mudstone and sandstone deposits and (6) marl deposits.

The presence of these types of facies suggest active channels, crevasse splays, sheet floods, and floodplains with paleosols and lakes. Thick and laterally pervasive units of fine-grained sediments, formed as suspension fall-out on the floodplain, indicating low-energy conditions and a relatively gentle surface gradient in the area, are by far the most common sedimentary component. Channel-related sandstones and conglomerates indicate that the rivers had a low-sinuosity and were braided, to anastomosing types.

== Fossil content ==
=== Mammals ===
| Genus | Species | Abundance | Notes |
|---|---|---|---|
| Acerorhinus | A. sp. | | A rhinocerid |
| Chleuastochoerus | C. stehlini | | A suid |
| Dicerorhinus | D. ringstromi | | A rhinocerid. One member of this genus is still alive today: Dicerorhinus sumatrensis, the Sumatran Rhinoceros |
| Erinaceus | E. sp. | | Of order Erinaceomorpha, the hedgehogs, four species from this genus are alive today. |
| Hipparion | H. (Hippotherium) weihoense | Relatively common in this region | An early equid. Appeared very horse-like, roughly the size of a pony, but still had three toes: one large, central toe that carried most of its weight, and two vestigial toes, one on each side. The skull bears a diastema. |
| Hipparion | H. chiai | Relatively common in this region | An early equid. Appeared very horse-like, roughly the size of a pony, but still had three toes: one large, central toe that carried most of its weight, and two vestigial toes, one on each side. The skull bears a diastema. |
| Miomachairodus | M. pseudaeluroides | rare | an early machairodont, member of tribe Machairodontini, related to Hemimachairodus and Machairodus. |
| Palaeotragus | P. decepiens | | An early giraffid |
| Palaeotragus | P. microdon | | An early giraffid |
| Samotherium | S. decipiens | | An early giraffid |
| Tetralophodon | T. exoletus | | A ten-foot tall proboscid who is known generally from fossilized teeth, known for its four ridges. |
| Dinocrocuta | D. gigantea | | A large carnivore within the family Percrocutidae, closely related to family Hyaenidae, containing today's hyenas. They appeared slope-backed and had powerful jaws. |
| Gazella | G. gaudryi | | Still a common genus in Africa, central and southeast Asia. Usually light and swift, adapted to open areas and sprints. Six species are still alive today, including Gazella thomsoni, the Thomson's gazelle, and Gazella dorcas, Dorca's gazelle. |
| Shaanxispira | | | |
| Nannocricetus | N. primituvus | well documented, but not wildly abundant in any formation, unlike closely related species Sinocrietus | Holotype for Nannocricetus primituvus discovered in the Bahe Formation |

=== Turtles ===
| Genus | Species | Abundance | Notes |
|---|---|---|---|
| Testudo | T. sphaerica | | |
| Indeterminate emydid remains | | | |
