= Yeni Eskihisar =

Geologic formation in Turkey

- Stratigraphic range: Late Miocene
- Type: Geological formation

Location
- Region: Muğla Province
- Country: Turkey

Yeni Eskihisar is a late Miocene formation in Yatağan, Muğla Province, Turkey. It is well known for its pollen studies.

== Vertebrate paleofauna ==
- Thalassictis montadai (Mammalia, Carnivora, Hyaenidae)
- Protictitherium cingulatum (Mammalia, Carnovira, Hyaenidae)
- Peruniinae (Mammalia, Carnivora, Mustelidae)
- Miomachairodus (Mammalia, Carnivora, Felidae)
