= Tchadailurus =

Tchadailurus Temporal range: Late Miocene

Scientific classification
- Kingdom: Animalia
- Phylum: Chordata
- Class: Mammalia
- Order: Carnivora
- Family: Felidae
- Subfamily: †Machairodontinae
- Genus: †Tchadailurus; Bonis et al., 2018

Type species
- †Tchadailurus adei Bonis et al., 2018

Extinct genus of carnivores

Tchadailurus is a genus of machairodontine felid from the late Miocene of Chad, Africa.

== Etymology ==
The genus name Tchadailurus comes from Chad, the country where the original fossils were found, and the Greek -ailurus, which means cat. The species name adei comes from the word for "small" in Goran, a local language.

== Taxonomy ==
Tchadailurus adei was described based on fossils found in 2018 in a late Miocene-dated locality in Chad. It placed in the subfamily Machairodontinae due to having dental features similar to those of later saber-toothed cats, but the relatively primitive features and age of the fossils made it impossible to assign the species to a specific tribe.

A 2023 study found that T. adei grouped inside the genus Yoshi and suggested recombining the species as Y. adei, rendering Tchadailurus a synonym.

=== Phylogeny ===
- †Machairodontinae
  - †Metailurini
  - †Tchadailurus adei
  - - †Smilodontini
    - - †Machairodontini
      - †Homotherini

== Description ==
Tchadailurus was described based on a single specimen that consisted of a partial skull and skeleton (including several vertebrae and parts of the legs and paws), likely from a single individual. Similar in size to a lynx, Tchadailurus adei had a longer tail and the "flattened" canine teeth characteristic of the machairodonts.

The primitive features of Tchadailurus adei indicate that it could be ancestral to later machairodont lineages.

== Paleoecology ==
In the Djurab desert in northern Chad in central Africa, Tchadailurus seems to have lived alongside fellow machairodonts Lokotunjailurus, Amphimachairodus and early representatives of the genus Megantereon as well as four other cat species. In addition to these other cats, animals such as crocodiles, three-toed horses, fish, monkeys, hippos, aardvarks, turtles, rodents, giraffes, snakes, antelopes, pigs, mongooses, foxes, hyenas, otters, honey badgers and the hominid Sahelanthropus dwelled here, providing ample food. Based on these and other fossils, it is theorized that the Djurab was once the shore of a lake, generally forested close to the waters with savannah-like areas some distance away. The great number of cat species in the environment indicates that there was significant room and available niches for multiple species of large felids to coexist.
