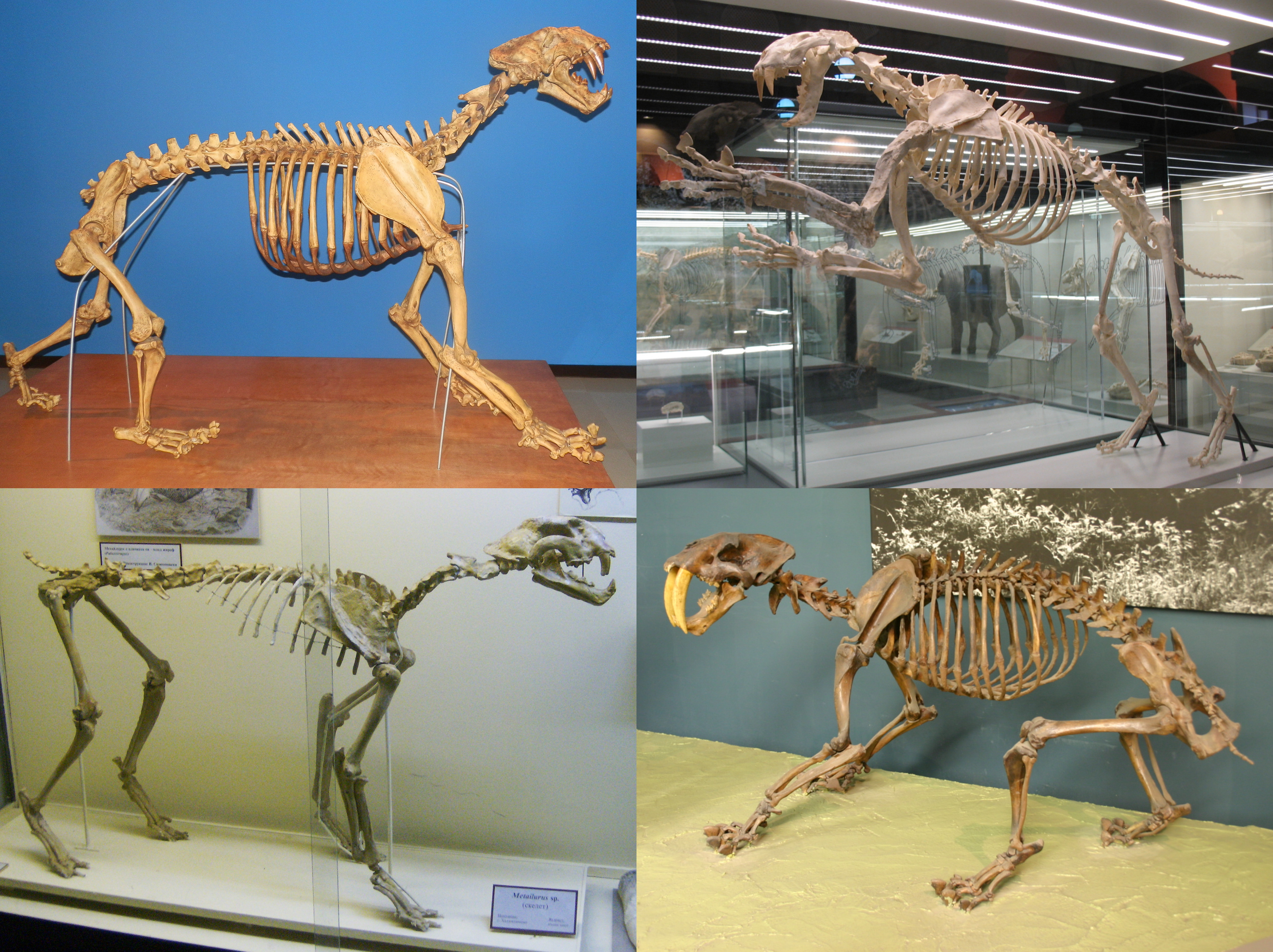
- Homotherium venezuelensis, Machairodus aphanistus, Metailurus sp. and Smilodon fatalis

Scientific classification
- Kingdom: Animalia
- Phylum: Chordata
- Class: Mammalia
- Order: Carnivora
- Family: Felidae
- Subfamily: †Machairodontinae; Gill, 1872

Subgroups
- †Homotherini; †Machairodontini; †Metailurini; †Smilodontini

= Machairodontinae =

Machairodontinae Temporal range: Middle Miocene to Early Holocene 14–0.0082 Ma Possible Early Miocene origin based on molecular clock

Extinct subfamily of sabertooth cats

Machairodontinae (from Ancient Greek μάχαιρα (mákhaira), a type of ancient sword, and ὀδούς (odoús), meaning "tooth") is an extinct subfamily of carnivoran mammals of the cat family Felidae, representing the earliest diverging major branch of the family.

Machairodonts varied in size from comparable to lynxes to exceeding that of lions. The Machairodontinae contain many of the extinct predators commonly known as "saber-toothed cats", including those with greatly elongated upper maxillary canines, such as the famed genus Smilodon and Megantereon, though the degree of elongation was variable, and in some machairodontines like Dinofelis the length of the upper canines was much more modest. Sometimes, other carnivorous mammals with elongated teeth are also called saber-toothed cats, although they do not belong to the felids. Besides the machairodonts, other saber-toothed predators included gorgonopsians, nimravids, machaeroidines, and thylacosmilids. Unlike living big cats, which generally clamp the muzzle or throat of prey to asphyxiate them, saber-toothed machairodontines are thought to have killed prey using a bite to the neck once immobilised, using their neck muscles to drive the saber teeth into the throat while the lower jaw served as an anchor, causing rapid death via blood loss.

Likely originating in Eurasia during the Middle Miocene, they eventually spread to every continent except Australia and Antarctica. Machairodonts were the dominant group of cats and large mammalian predators across Afro-Eurasia and North America during the late Miocene and Early Pliocene, a time when the ancestors of living cats (Felinae sensu lato) were mostly small sized. Machairodonts began to decline from the end of the Miocene onwards, which accelerated during the Pleistocene, perhaps as a result of environmental change and consequential changes in prey abundance, competition with large living cat lineages such as the pantherins as well as possibly archaic humans. The last species belonging to the genera Smilodon and Homotherium became extinct along with many other large mammals around 12-10,000 years ago as part of the end-Pleistocene extinction event, following human arrival to the Americas at the end of the Late Pleistocene.

== Evolution ==
=== Family Felidae ===
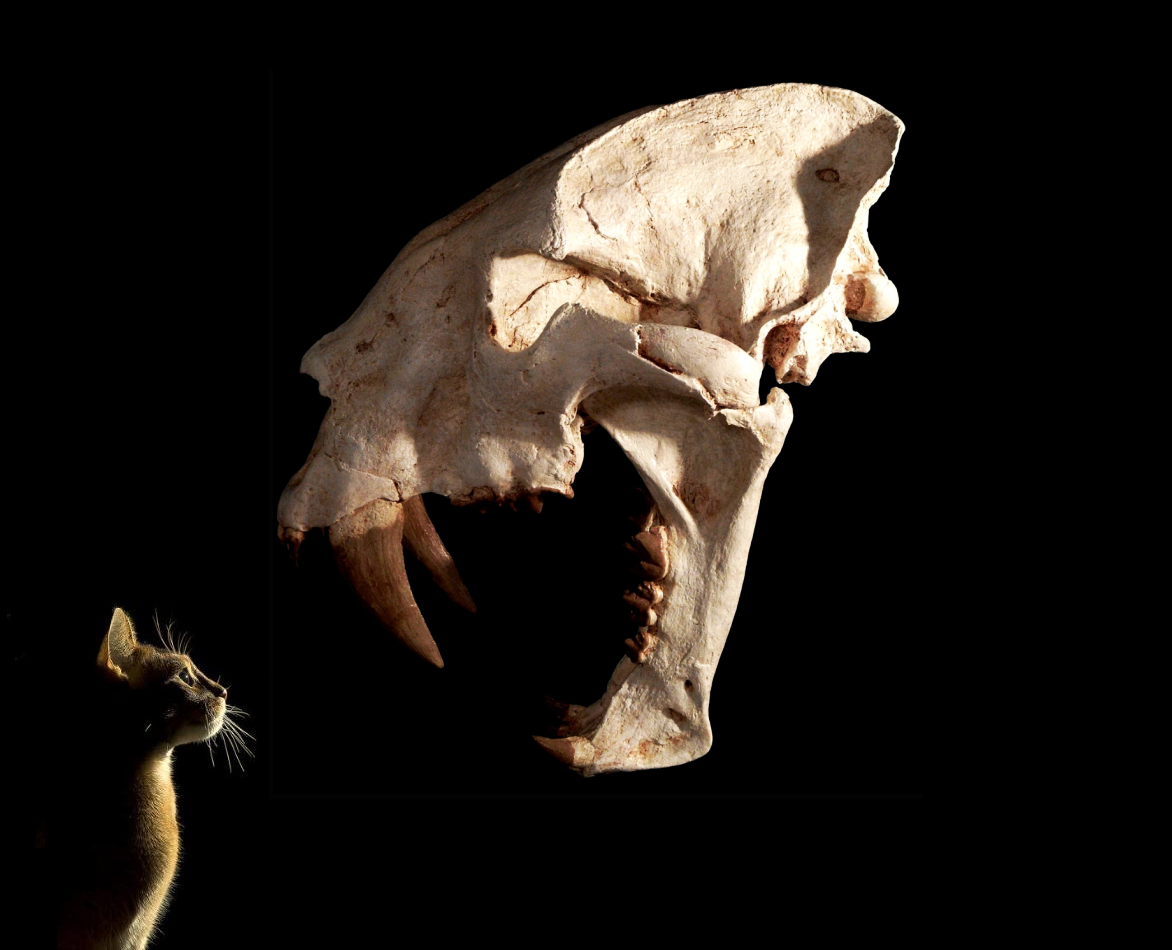
A male Amphimachairodus giganteus was one of the largest machairodonts. It dwarfs its modern relative, the common house cat, Felis catus.

Based on mitochondrial DNA sequences extracted from fossils, machairodontines diverged from the ancestors of living cats around 20 million years ago, with the last surviving machairodont genera Homotherium and Smilodon estimated to have diverged from each other about 18 million years ago.

The Machairodontinae originated in the middle Miocene of Europe. The early felid Pseudaelurus quadridentatus showed a trend towards elongated upper canines, and is believed to be at the base of the machairodontine evolution. The earliest known machairodont genus is the middle Miocene Miomachairodus from Africa and Turkey. Until the late Miocene, machairodontines co-existed at several places together with barbourofelids, archaic large carnivores that also bore long sabre-teeth.

Traditionally, three different tribes of machairodontines were recognized, the Smilodontini with typical dirk-toothed forms, such as Megantereon and Smilodon, the Machairodontini or Homotherini with scimitar-toothed cats, such as Machairodus or Homotherium, and the Metailurini, containing genera such as Dinofelis and Metailurus. However, some in the past have regrouped the Metailurini within the other felid subfamily, the Felinae, along with all modern cats. A 2022 phylogenetic study suggests a polyphyletic relationship between Metailurini and Smilodontini, with the genus Paramachairodus being ancestral to both groups.

The name 'saber-toothed tigers' is misleading. Machairodonts were not in the same subfamily as tigers, there is no evidence that they had tiger-like coat patterns, and this broad group of animals did not all live or hunt in the same manner as the modern tiger. DNA analysis published in 2005 confirmed and clarified cladistic analysis in showing that the Machairodontinae diverged early from the ancestors of modern cats and are not closely related to any living feline species.

=== Classification ===
Subfamily †Machairodontinae
| Tribe | Image | Genus | Species |
|---|---|---|---|
| Incertae sedis | | †Tchadailurus Bonis et al., 2018 | †T. adei |
| †Homotherini | | †Amphimachairodus Kretzoi, 1929 | †A. alvarezi; †A. coloradensis; †A. giganteus; †A. kurteni; †A. hezhengensis; †A. horribilis |
| †Homotherini | | †Homotherium Fabrini, 1890 | †H. ischyrus; †H. latidens; †H. serum; †H. venezuelensis |
| †Homotherini | | †Lokotunjailurus Werdelin 2003 | †L. emageritus; †L. fanonei; †L. chinsamyae |
| †Homotherini | | †Nimravides Kitts 1958 | †N. catacopsis; †N. galiani; †N. hibbardi; †N. pedionomus; †N. thinobates |
| †Homotherini | | †Xenosmilus Martin et al., 2000 | †X. hodsonae |
| †Machairodontini | | †Hemimachairodus Koenigswald, 1974 | †H. zwierzyckii |
| †Machairodontini | | †Machairodus Kaup, 1833 | †M. alberdiae; †M. aphanistus; †M. laskerevi; †M. robinsoni |
| †Machairodontini | | †Longchuansmilus Jiangzuo et al 2022 | †L. xingyongi |
| †Machairodontini | | †Adeilosmilus Jiangzuo, Werdelin, Sun et al 2022 | †A. kabir |
| †Machairodontini | | †Taowu Jiangzuo, Werdelin, Sun et al 2022 | †T. liui |
| †Machairodontini | | †Miomachairodus Schmidt-Kittler 1976 | †M. pseudaeluroides |
| †Metailurini | | †Adelphailurus Hibbard, 1934 | †A. kansensis |
| †Metailurini | | †Dinofelis Zdansky, 1924 | †D. aronoki; †D. barlowi; †D. cristata; †D. darti; †D. diastemata; †D. paleoonca; †D. petteri; †D. piveteaui; †D. werdelini |
| †Metailurini | | †Metailurus Zdansky, 1924 | †M. boodon; †M. major; †M. mongoliensis; †M. ultimus; †M. hengduanshanensis |
| †Metailurini | | †Stenailurus Crusafont-Pairo & Aguirre, 1972 | †S. teilhardi |
| †Metailurini | | †Fortunictis Pons-Moyà 1987 | †F. acerensis |
| †Metailurini | | †Yoshi Spassov and Geraads, 2014 | †Y. garevskii; †Y. minor; †Y. faie; †Y. obscura; †Y. youngdengensis |
| †Smilodontini | | †Megantereon Croizet & Jobert, 1828 | †M. cultridens; †M. ekidoit; †M. hesperus; †M. inexpectatus; †M. microta; †M. nihowanensis; †M. vakhshensis; †M. whitei |
| †Smilodontini | | †Paramachairodus Pilgrim, 1913 | †P. maximiliani; †P. orientalis; †P. transasiaticus; †P. yingliangi |
| †Smilodontini | | †Promegantereon Kretzoi, 1938 | †P. ogygia |
| †Smilodontini | | †Rhizosmilodon Wallace & Hulbert, 2013 | †R. fiteae |
| †Smilodontini | | †Smilodon Lund, 1842 | †S. fatalis; †S. gracilis; †S. populator |

=== Phylogeny ===
Phylogeny after Werdelin and Flink (2018):

- Machairodontinae
  - - Metailurus
    - - Promegantereon
      - Nimravides
  - - Dinofelis
    - - Rhizosmilodon
      - Machairodus
      - - Homotherini
          - Amphimachairodus
          - - Xenosmilus
            - Homotherium
        - Smilodontini
          - Megantereon
          - Smilodon

Composite cladogram following Lautenschlager et al. (2020):

- Machairodontinae
  - - Homotherini
      - Machairodus
      - - Amphimachairodus
        - - Homotherium spp.
          - - Xenosmilus
            - Homotherium spp.
  - - Metailurini
      - Adelphailurus
      - - Metailurus
        - - Yoshi
          - Dinofelis
    - Smilodontini
      - Promegantereon
      - - Megantereon
        - Smilodon

=== Evolutionary history and origin of phenotype ===
Until the recent discovery of the Late Miocene fossil depository known as Batallones-1 in the 1990s, specimens of Smilodontini and Homotheriini ancestors were rare and fragmentary, so the evolutionary history of the saber-toothed phenotype, a phenotype affecting craniomandibular, cervical forelimb and forelimb anatomy, was largely unknown. Prior to the excavation of Batallones-1, the predominating hypothesis was that the highly derived saber-toothed phenotype arose rapidly through pleiotropic evolution. Batollnes-1 unearthed new specimens of Promegantereon ogygia, a Smilodontini ancestor, and Machairodus aphanistus, a Homotheriini ancestor, shedding light on evolutionary history. (Though the Smilodontini ancestor was originally assigned to the genus Paramachairodus, it was later revised to the genus Promegantereon). The leopard-sized P. ogygia (living 9.0 Ma) inhabited Spain (and perhaps additional territory).

The current hypothesis for the evolution of the saber-toothed phenotype, made possible by Batollnes-1, is that this phenotype arose gradually over time through mosaic evolution. Although the exact cause is uncertain, current findings have supported the hypothesis that a need for the rapid killing of prey was the principal pressure driving the development of the phenotype over evolutionary time. As indicated by high instances of broken teeth, the biotic environment of saber-toothed cats was one marked by intense competition.

Broken teeth indicate the frequency at which teeth contact bone. Increased teeth-bone contact suggests either increased consumption of carcasses, rapid consumption of prey, or increased aggression over kills – all three of which point to decreased prey availability, heightening competition between predators. Such a competitive environment would favor the faster killing of prey, because if prey is taken away before consumption (such as by out-competing) the energetic cost of capturing that prey is not reimbursed, and, if this occurs often enough in the lifetime of a predator, death by exhaustion or starvation would result. The earliest adaptations improving the speed at which prey was killed are present in the skull and mandible of P. ogygia and of M. aphanistus, and in the cervical vertebrae and forelimb of P. ogygia. They provide further morphological evidence for the importance of speed in the evolution of the saber-toothed phenotype.

Machariodont diversity declined from the end of the Miocene onwards, especially during the Pleistocene. By the Late Pleistocene, only two genera of machairodonts remained: Smilodon, and the distantly related Homotherium, both largely confined to the Americas. These two genera became extinct around 13,000-10,000 years ago as part of the wave of extinctions of most large animals across the Americas.

== Fossil remains ==
=== Skull ===
The most studied section of the machairodont group is the skull, and specifically the teeth. With a large range of genera, fossil representation, comparable modern relatives, diversity within the group, and a good understanding of the ecosystems inhabited, the machairodont subfamily provides potential for research on the analysis of hypercarnivores, specialization, and the relationships between predator and prey.

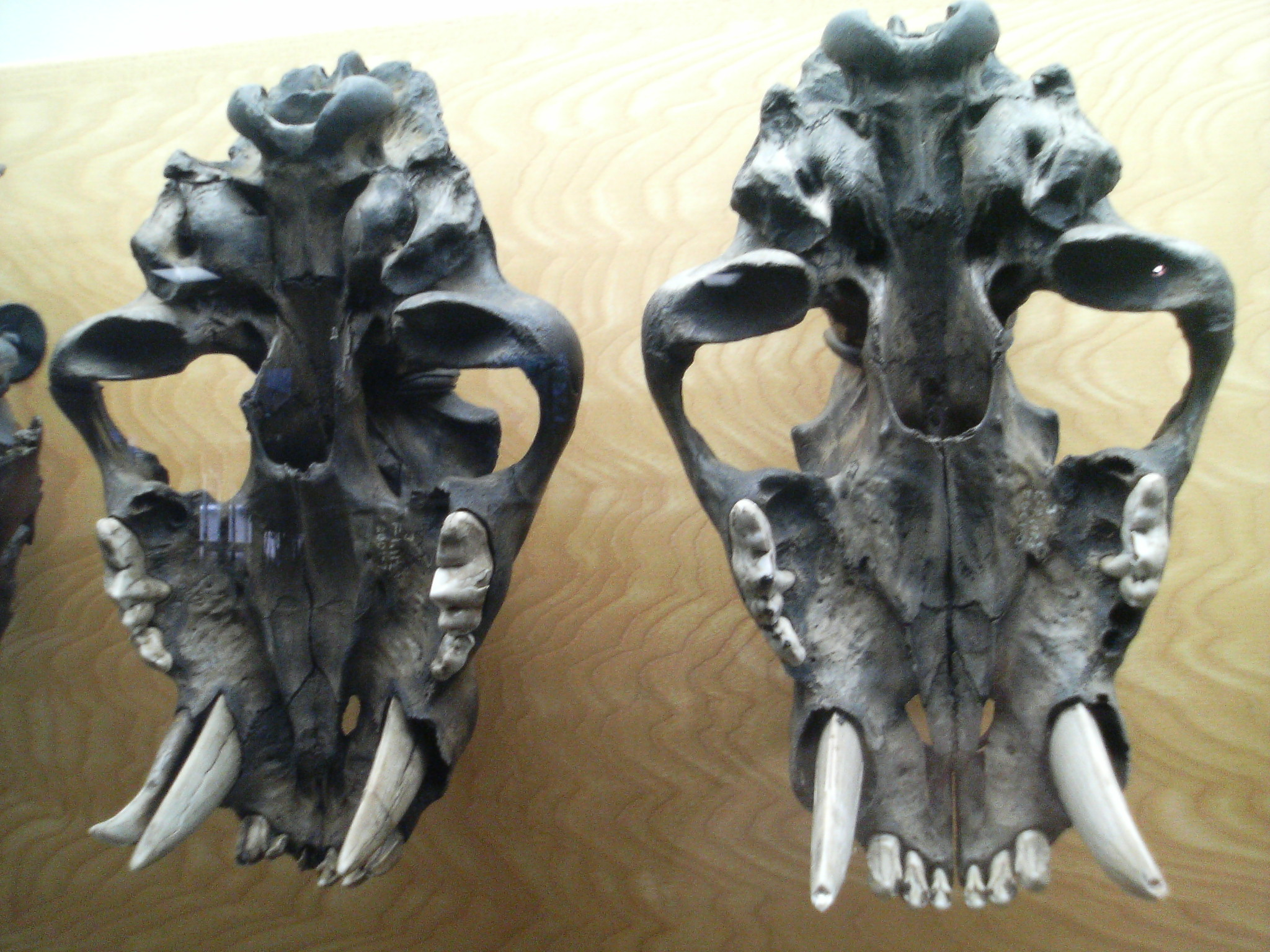
Undersides of the skulls of two Smilodon, the skull on the left being in the process of replacing the canines

Machairodonts are divided into two types: dirk-toothed and scimitar-toothed. Dirk-toothed cats had elongated, narrow upper canines and generally had stocky bodies. Scimitar-toothed cats had broader and shorter upper canines and a typically lithe body form with longer legs. The longer-toothed cats often had a bony flange that extended from their lower mandible. However, one genus, Xenosmilus, known only from two fairly complete fossils, broke this mould; possessing both the stout, heavy limbs associated with dirk-toothed cats, and the stout canines of a scimitar-toothed cat.

Carnivores reduced the number of their teeth as they specialized in eating meat instead of grinding plant or insect matter. Cats have the fewest teeth of any carnivore group, and machairodonts reduce the number even further. Most machairodonts retain six incisors, two canines, and six premolars in each jaw, with two molars in the upper jaw only. Some genera, such as Smilodon, bear only eight premolars with one fewer on the mandible, leaving only four large premolars on the mandible along with two stunted canines and six stout incisors. The canines are curved back smoothly, and serrations are present, but are minor and wear away with age, leaving most middle-aged machairodonts (at about four or five) with no serrations. Hints in the bones such as these help paleontologists to estimate the age of an individual for population studies of an animal long extinct.

Longer canines necessitate a larger gape. A lion with a gape of 95° could not bear canines that are nine inches long because they would not be able to have a gap between the lower and upper canines larger than an inch or so, not enough to use for killing. Machairodonts, along with the other groups of animals that acquired similar teeth by convergent evolution, needed a way to change their skulls to accommodate the canines in several ways.

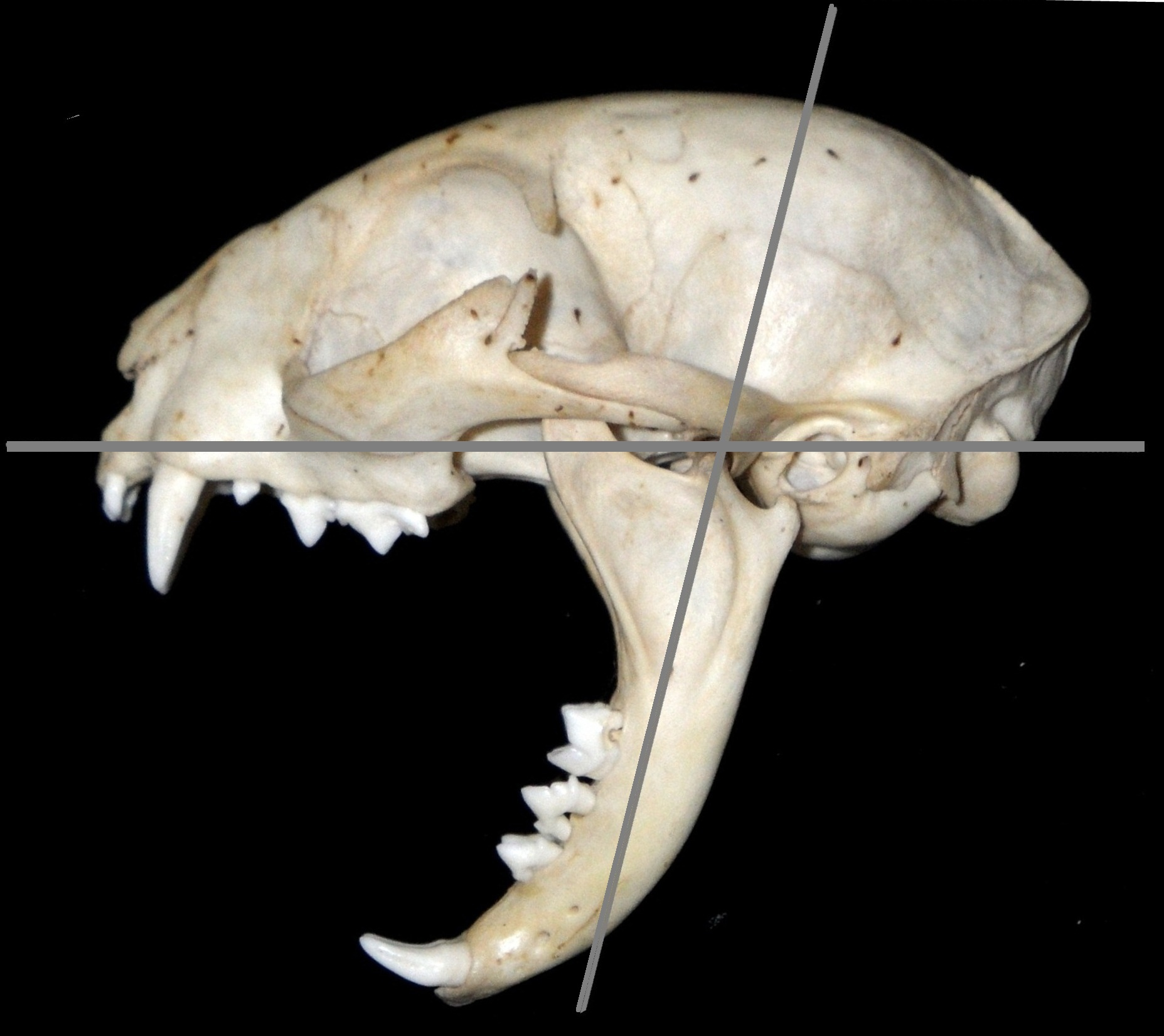
Domestic cat skull, at maximum gape (80°)

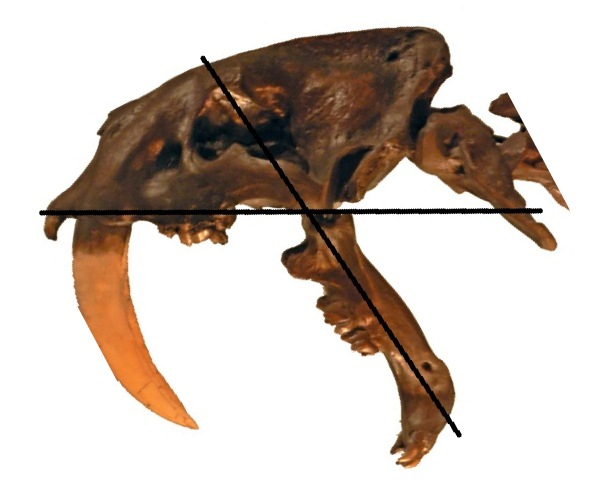
Smilodon fatalis skull, at maximum gape (128°)

The main inhibitors of a large gape for mammals are the temporalis and masseter muscles at the back of the jaw. These muscles have the capacity to be powerful and undergo a great degree of modification for ranging bite forces, but are not very elastic due to their thickness, placement, and strength. To open the mouth wider, these species needed to make the muscles smaller and change their shape. The first step in this was to reduce the coronoid process. The masseter, and especially the temporalis, muscles insert on this jutting strip of bone, so reduction of this process meant the reduction of the muscles. Less mass for each muscle allowed greater elasticity and less resistance to a wide gape. Changing the shape of the temporalis muscle in this respect created a greater distance between the origin and insertion, so that the muscle became longer and more compact, which is generally a more suitable format for this type of stretching. This reduction led to a weaker bite.

The skulls of machairodonts suggests another change in the shape of the temporalis muscle. The main constraint to opening the jaws is that the temporalis muscle will tear if it is stretched past a critical degree around the glenoid process when the mouth is opened. In modern felids, the occipital bone extends backward, but the temporalis muscles that attach to this surface are strained when opening the jaw wide as the muscle is wrapped around the glenoid process. To reduce the stretch of the temporalis muscle around the immovable process, machairodonts evolved a skull with a more vertical occipital bone. The domestic cat has a gape of 80°, while a lion has a gape of 91°. In Smilodon, the gape is 128°, and the angle between the ramus of the mandible and the occipital bone is 100°. This angle is the major limiting factor of the gape, and reducing the angle of the occipital bone relative to the palate of the mouth, as seen in Smilodon, allowed the gape to increase further. Had the occipital bone not been stretched towards the palate, and closer to perpendicular, the gape would theoretically be less, at roughly 113°.

The skulls of many sabre-tooth predators, including machairodonts, are tall from top to bottom and short from front to back. The zygomatic arches are compressed, and the portion of the skull bearing facial features, such as eyes, is higher, while the muzzle is shorter. These changes help to compensate for an increased gape. Machairodonts also had reduced bottom canines, maintaining the distance between those in the upper and lower jaws.

=== Post-cranial skeleton ===
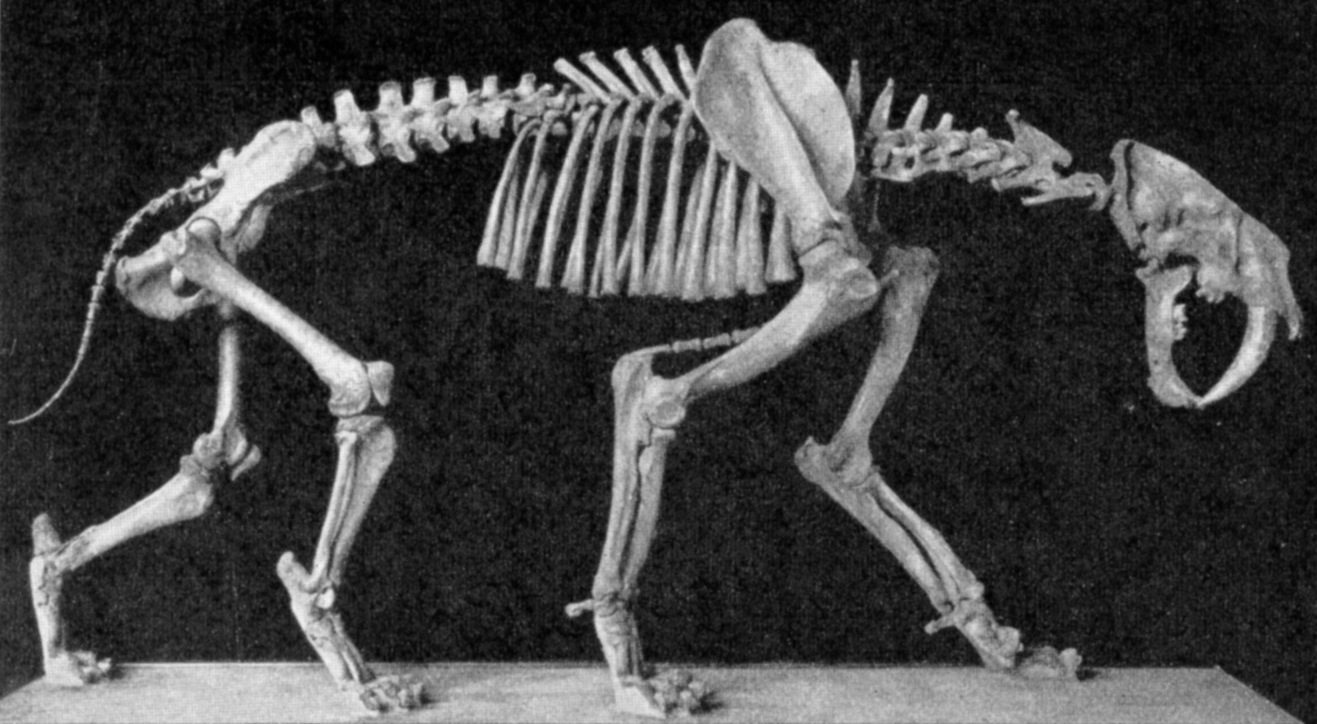
Articulated skeleton of Smilodon

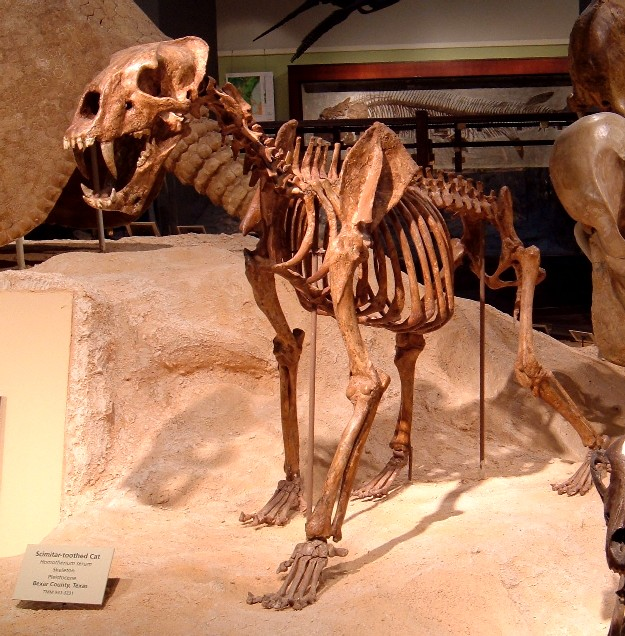
Articulated skeleton of Homotherium

The dirk-toothed machairodonts, including Smilodon, Megantereon, and Paramachairodus, are defined by sturdiness and strength with the most primitive (Paramachairodus) being smaller and more lithe than the more advanced Smilodon; the intermediate Megantereon falls in between. They were not stamina runners with short tarsi and metatarsi and heavy bodies. When compared with the modern lion, their ribcages were barrel-like with narrow anterior ends and expanded posterior ends. Their scapulae were very well developed, especially in Smilodon, to allow for a larger surface area of attachment for massive shoulder and triceps muscles. The cervical vertebrae are very sturdy, and the attachments for muscles were powerful and strong. The lumbar section of the vertebral column was shortened. The tails were, from most primitive to most advanced, growing shorter and shorter, resulting in the bobcat-like tail of Smilodon. When viewing only postcranial remains, they are more similar in structure to modern bears than to modern cats.

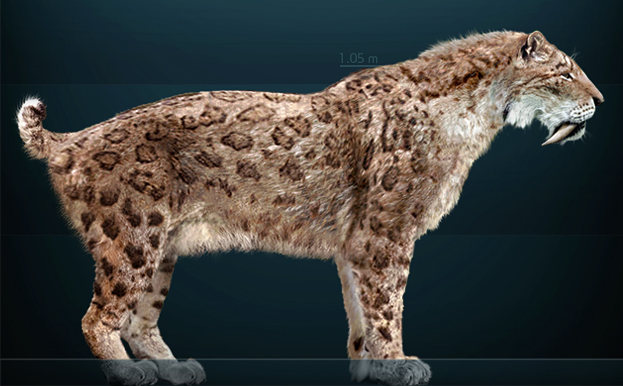
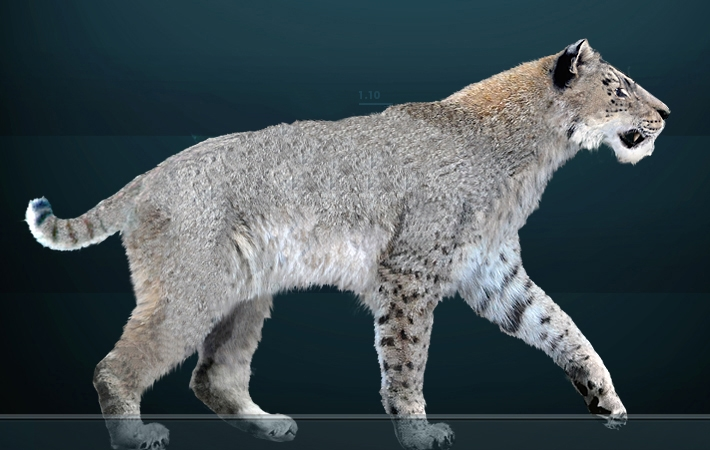
Reconstructions of the dirk-toothed cat Smilodon fatalis (left) and the scimitar-toothed cat Homotherium serum (right)

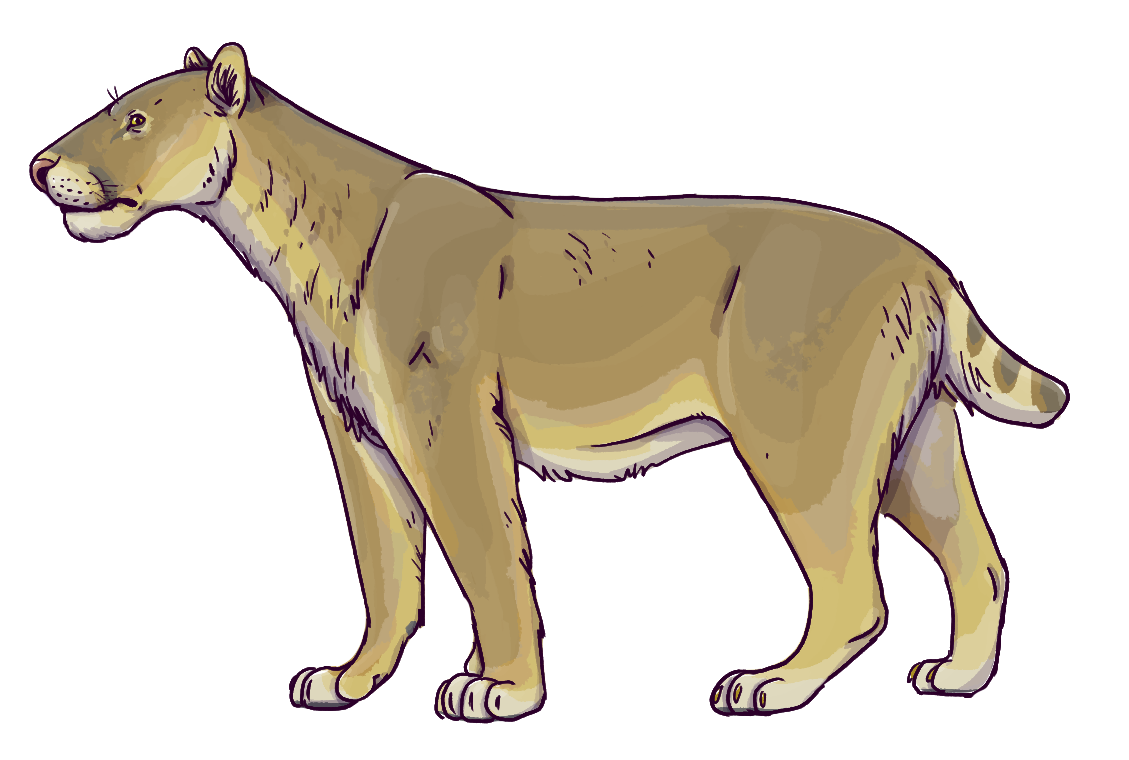
A reconstruction of the scimitar-toothed cat Homotherium

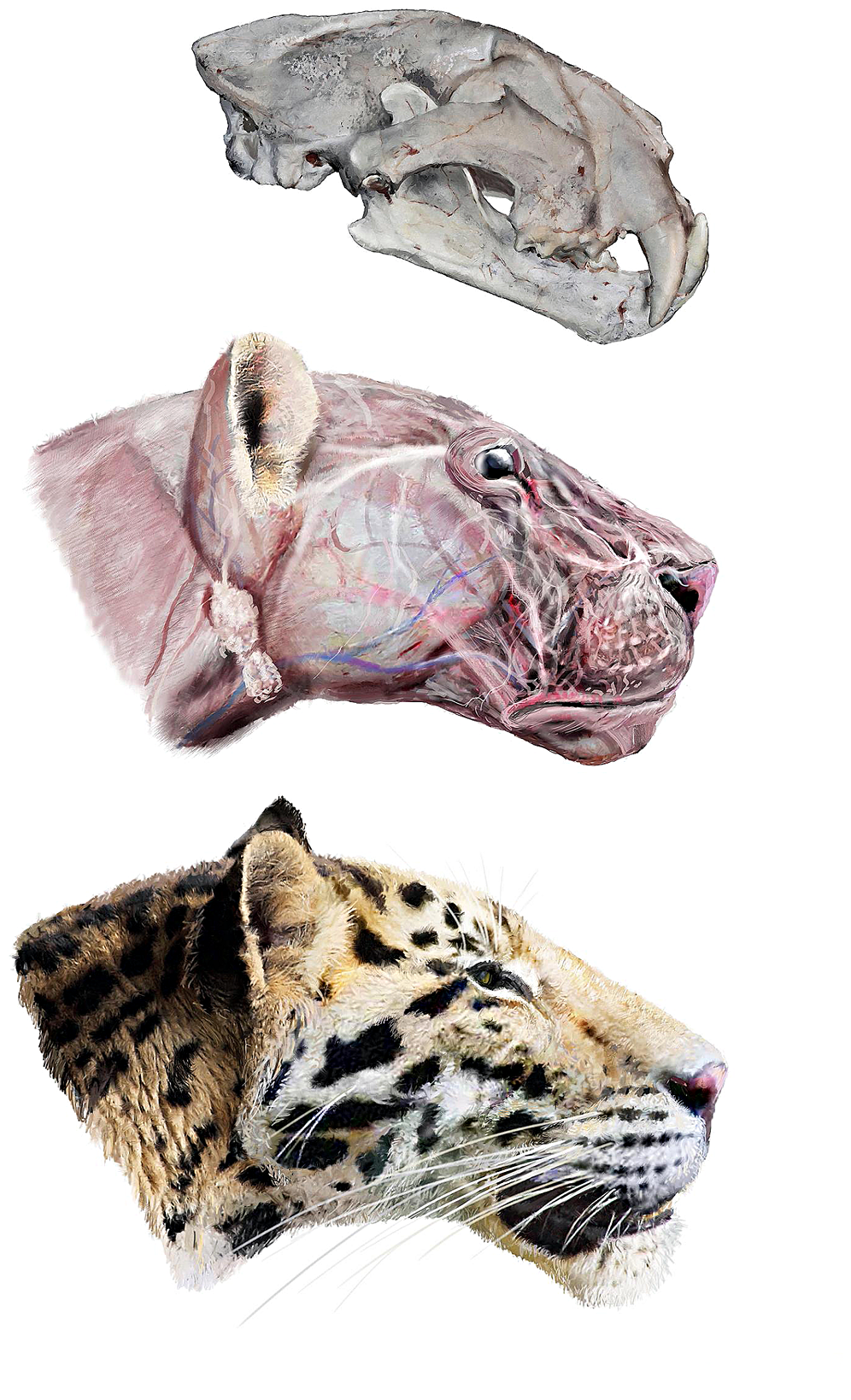
An example of a sequence reconstruction of Panthera zdanskyi as used in reconstructing machairodonts

The scimitar-toothed machairodonts (Machairodontini, Homotherini and Metailurini) are a much more diverse group. The canines of this larger group are significantly shorter and generally stouter, but still much longer than in any modern cat. Because of the diversity of the genera, it is difficult to illustrate a specific type. The Machairodontini were the first among the machairodontines and the felids overall to attain near-lion size and already showed impressive upper canines early on in their evolution in the Miocene, but apart from these retained a relatively cat-like morphology that was more similar to modern pantherines than more derived machairodontines from later periods. Machairodus appears to have been an excellent jumper. The homotherines were overall more specialized and already the earliest taxa like Lokotunjailurus were remarkably long-legged and lean, though as large as a modern lion, a trend that further magnified in the Pliocene-Pleistocene genus Homotherium, which was once thought to be plantigrade, but was proven to be digitigrade. Homotherium serum, the most derived known species from the Pleistocene of North America bore a sloped back that might have made it excellent at running long distances, similar to the living spotted hyena. It also had a well-developed visual cortex, a large nasal cavity that would have allowed for better oxygen intake and smaller, only partially retractable claws that might have functioned like spikes for a better grip on the ground, all of which seems to point to a highly active lifestyle and cursoriality. Xenosmilus however, a mid-Pleistocene homotherine from Florida and close relative of Homotherium, broke this trend in that it had both scimitar-like teeth and a bulky and strong build that is more typical for dirk-tooths.

The third scimitar-toothed tribe, the Metailurini, bore overall similarity to modern cats, but were highly diverse in terms of morphology with species ranging from a small cheetah to a small lion in size. Some had comparatively short, almost conical upper canines similar to modern cats, while some species bore strongly pronounced machairodontine features. However, in contrast to homotherines and smilodontines, even the most derived metailurines retained long tails, long hind legs and a long spine. On average, scimitar-toothed cats had more teeth than the average dirk-toothed machairodont, with six premolars on the mandible. When viewing only postcranial remains of similar-toothed machairodonts, many of their forms were comparatively similar to modern pantherines (genera Panthera and Neofelis).

=== Mummified specimen ===
In 2020, the mummified remains of a 3-week-old cub belonging to the species Homotherium latidens were found in Yakutia, Russia. They are believed to be the first of its kind to ever be found, with the fur's color and softness surprising scientists.

== Derived anatomy and diet ==
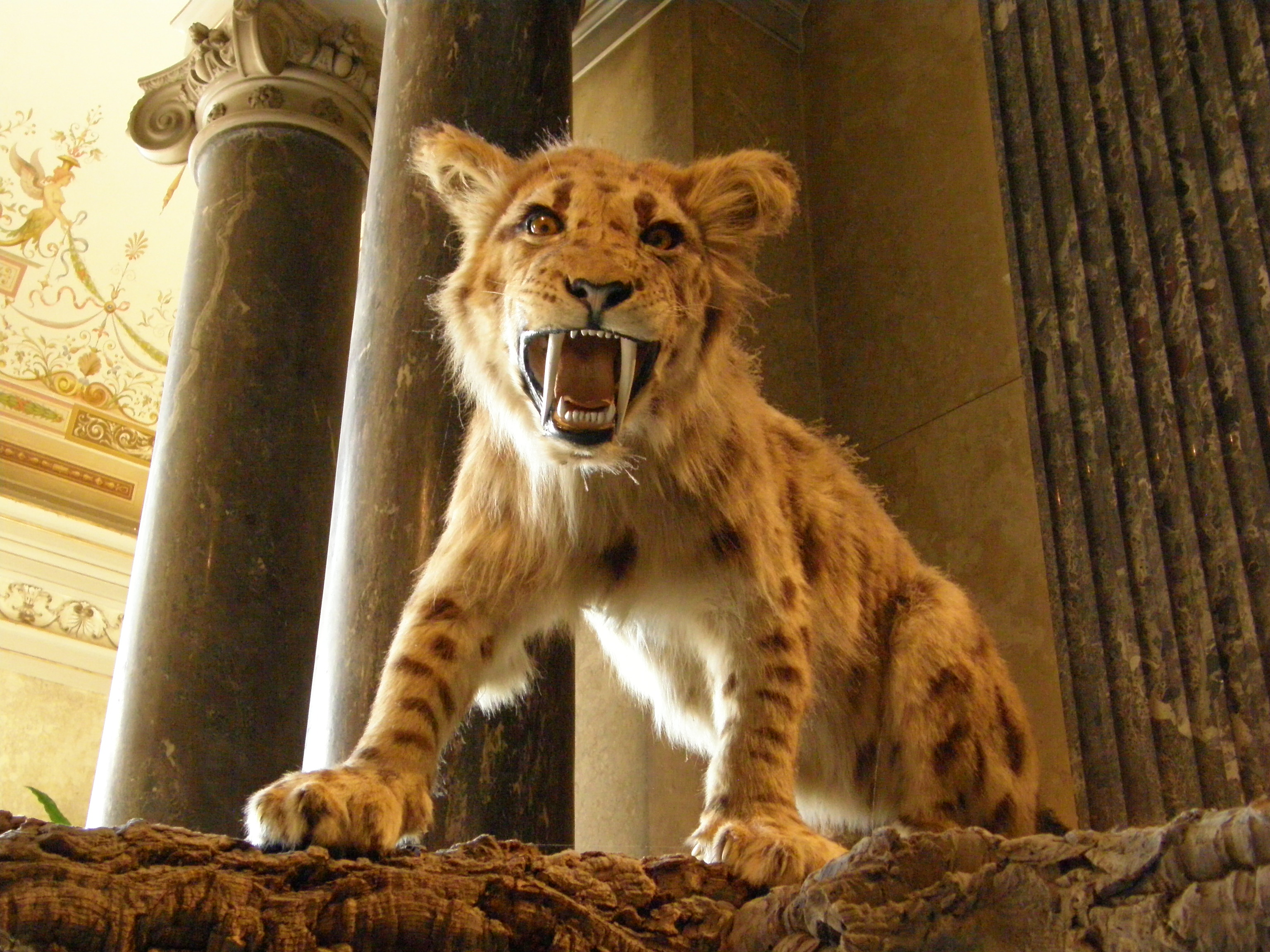
Reconstruction of Megantereon in sculpture

=== Bite strength ===
The jaws of machairodonts, especially more derived species with longer canines, such as Smilodon and Megantereon, are unusually weak. Digital reconstructions of the skulls of lions and of Smilodon show that the latter would have fared poorly with the stresses of holding onto struggling prey. The main issue was the stresses suffered by the mandible: a strong force threatened to break the jaw as pressure was placed on its weakest points.

Smilodon would have had one-third the bite force of a lion, had it used only its jaw muscles. However, the neck muscles that connected to the back of the skull were stronger and depressed the head, forcing the skull down. When the jaw was hyper-extended, the jaw muscles could not contract, but the neck muscles pressed the head down, forcing the canines into whatever resisted them. When the mouth was closed far enough, the jaw muscles could raise the mandible by some margin.

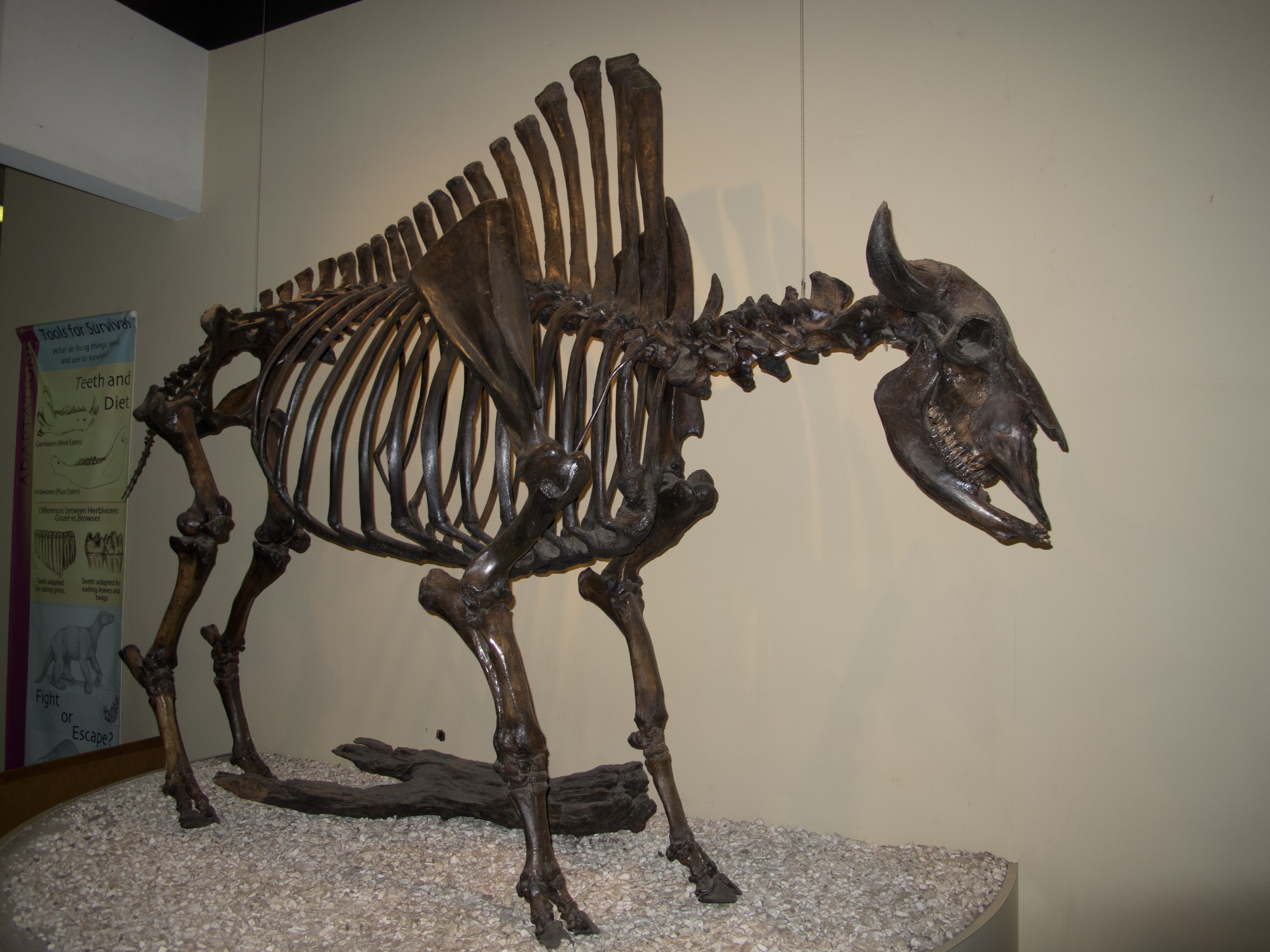
Bison antiquus, a primary prey of Smilodon, according to isotope analysis

=== Diet ===
On occasion, the bone of a fossilised predator is preserved well enough to retain recognizable proteins that belong to the species it consumed when alive. Stable isotope analysis of these proteins has shown that Smilodon preyed mainly on bison and horses, and occasionally ground sloths and mammoths, while Homotherium often preyed on young mammoths and other grazers such as pronghorn antelope and bighorn sheep when mammoths were not available. Examinations published in 2022 of tooth wear patterns on Smilodon and bite marks on the bones of the peccary Platygonus by Xenosmilus suggest that machairodonts were capable of efficiently stripping and de-fleshing a carcass of meat when feeding. They also show a degree of bone consumption on par with that of modern lions, which themselves can and regularly do eat smaller bones when consuming a meal.

=== The face ===
American paleontologist George Miller set forth a set of features not previously thought of in the soft tissues of machairodonts, specifically Smilodon.

The first change he suggested in the appearance of machairodonts was lower ears, or rather the illusion of lower ears due to the higher sagittal crest. However, the positioning of the ears is always similar in modern felids, even in individuals that have crests comparable in size to those of sabretooth cats. The positioning of the pinnae, or outer ears, along with fur color, are dependent on the individual doing the reconstruction. Large or small, pointed or rounded, high or low, fossils do not record these characteristics, leaving them open to interpretation.

Miller also suggested a pug-like nose. Aside from the pug and similar dogs, no modern carnivore exhibits a pug nose due to it being an unnaturally created trait originating from selective breeding. The relatively low distribution of the pug nose has resulted in it being generally ignored. Miller's rationale is based on the retraction of Smilodon nasal bones. Criticism of Miller's theory compares the nasal bones of lions and tigers. Lions, when compared to tigers, also have strongly retracted nasal bones, but a lion's rhinarium, or external nose, is no more retracted than the tiger's. Thus, the pug nose of Smilodon proposed by Miller has little evidence in the physical structures of comparable animals. According to Antón, García-Perea and Turner (1998), the nostrils of living felids always extend to a similar position, independently of the length of the nasal bones, which in Smilodon falls within the range observed in modern species.

The third idea proposed is the elongation of the lips by 50%. While his other hypotheses have been largely discarded, the last is used significantly in modern depictions. Miller argues that longer lips allows the greater elasticity needed for biting prey with a wider gape. Although this argument has been disputed within the scientific community, it remains supported nevertheless by artists. Scientific criticism points out that the lips of modern cats, especially larger species, display incredible elasticity and the usual lip length would stretch suitably, despite the larger degree of opening, and that in living carnivores the lip line is always anterior to the masseter muscle, which in Smilodon was located just behind the carnassials. Regardless, reconstructions of Smilodon, Machairodus, and other species are shown with long lips, often resembling the jowls of large dogs.

Studies of Homotherium and Smilodon suggest that scimitar-toothed machairodonts like Homotherium itself possessed upper lips and gum tissue that could effectively hide and protect their upper canines; a trait they shared in common with modern cat species, while Smilodon had canines that remained partially exposed and protruded past the lips and chin even while the mouth was closed due to their great length.

=== Vocalizations ===
Comparisons of the hyoid bones of Smilodon and lions show that the former, and possibly other machairodonts, could potentially have roared like their modern relatives. However, a 2023 study suggested that while machairodonts had the same number of hyoid bones as "roaring" cats, their shape was closer to that of "purring" cats.

== Social behavior ==
=== Smilodon ===
A 2009 study compared the ratios of social and solitary carnivores in reserves in South Africa and Tanzania with those of fossils of California's La Brea tar pits, a well-known fossil bed from the Pleistocene, and how they responded to recorded sounds of dying prey, to infer whether Smilodon was social or not. At one time, the La Brea tar pits consisted of deep tar in which animals became trapped. As they died, their calls attracted predators, which in turn also became caught. It is considered the best Pleistocene fossil bed in North America for the number of animals caught and preserved in the tar, and may be similar to the situation created in the study. The assumption was that solitary carnivores would not approach the sources of such sounds, because of the danger of confrontation with other predators. Social carnivores, such as lions, have few other predators to fear, and will readily attend these calls. The study concluded that this latter situation most closely fit the ratio of animals found at the La Brea tar pits, and therefore that Smilodon was most likely social.

=== Homotherium ===
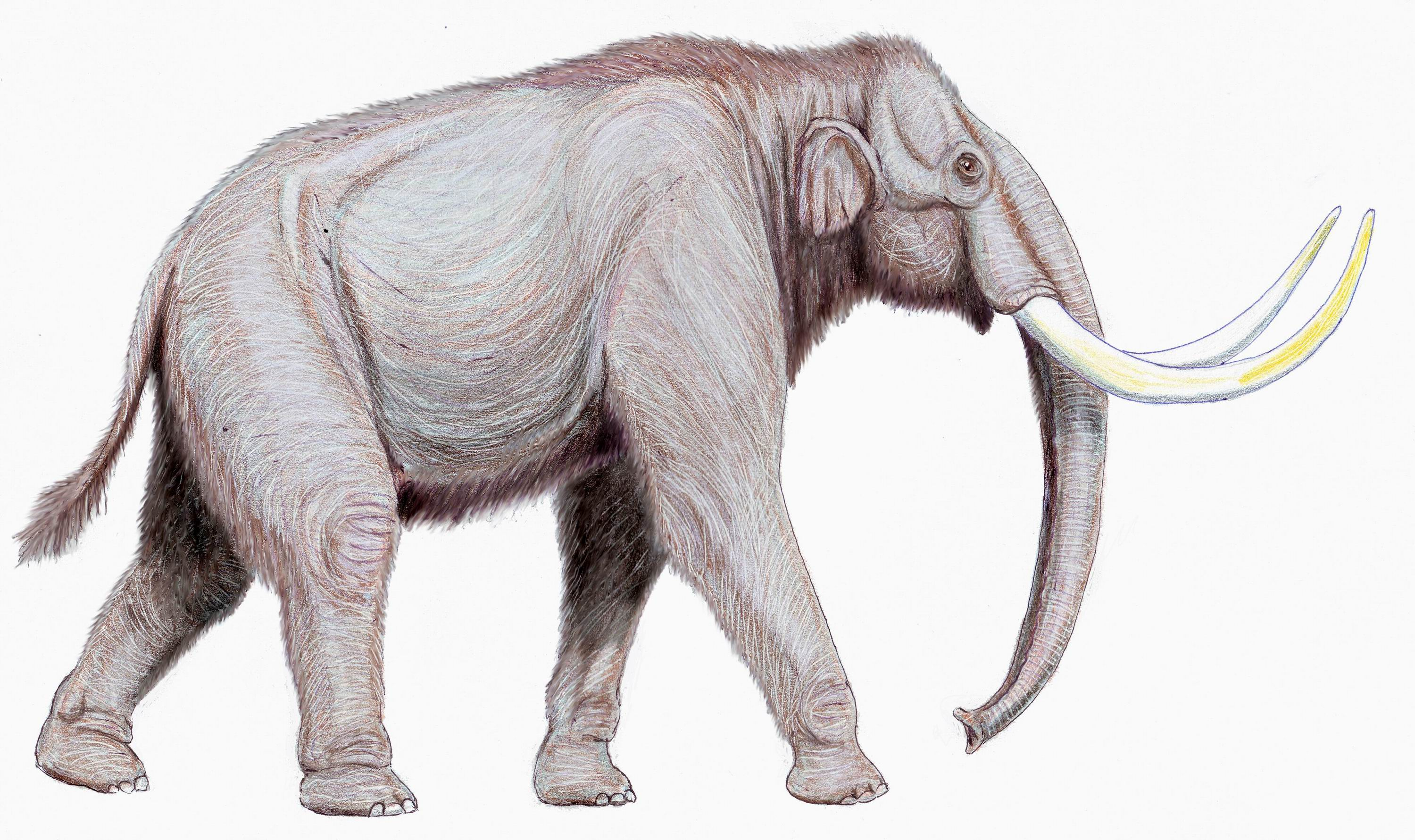
A species of mammoth similar to those possibly hunted by Homotherium

At Friesenhahn Cave, Texas, the remains of almost 400 juvenile mammoths were discovered along with skeletons of Homotherium. Homotherium groups have been suggested to have specialized in hunting young mammoths, and to have dragged the kills into secluded caves to eat inside, out from the open. They also retained excellent nocturnal vision, and hunting at night in the arctic regions would probably have been their prime hunting method.

The modern lion is capable of, in large numbers, killing weakened adult and healthy subadult elephants, so similar sized Homotherium likely could have managed the same feat with juvenile mammoths. This is supported by isotopic analysis. But the idea that a cat, even one of very large size and possibly social, was able to cooperatively 'drag' a 180-kilogram (400 lb) mammoth calf any real distance into a cave without damaging its teeth has aroused great criticism. Its sloped back and powerful lumbar section of its vertebrae suggested a bear-like build, so it might have been capable of pulling weights, but breaking canines, a fate suffered by Machairodus and Smilodon with some frequency, is not seen in Homotherium. Moreover, the bones of these young mammoths show the distinctive marks of Homotherium incisors, indicating they could efficiently process most of the meat on a carcass, indicating it was they and not scavengers who dragged the carcasses into the caves. Examination of the bones also indicates that the carcasses of these mammoths were dismembered by the cats before being dragged away, indicating that Homotherium would disarticulate their kill to transport it to a safe area and prevent scavengers from claiming a hard-won meal. Evidence also shows the cats were able to effectively strip flesh from bone in a manner that left noticeable score marks. Genetic analysis found the positive selection of cognitive genetics such as SCTR, this may suggest gregariousness in Homotherium.

=== Paleopathology ===
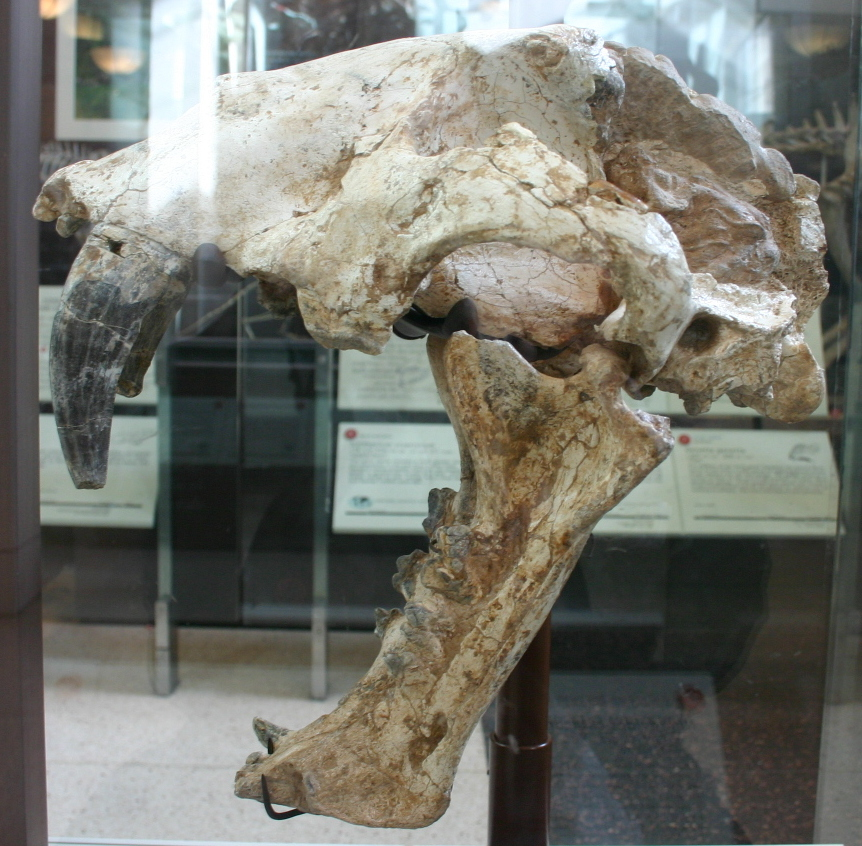
An Amphimachairodus giganteus skull with chipped left canine and more severely damaged right canine.

Machairodus is another genus with a few fossil evidence to suggest gregariousness. A paleopathology paper on M. aphanistus found evidence specimens with broken mandibles, a third metacarpal displaying signs of osteosclerosis, and a calcaneus displaying evidence of either a tumour or osteomyelitis. The authors suggested because of the high levels of sexual dimorphism and the survival of the serious injuries, M. aphanistus formed some social group. Because it lived in woodlands instead of open environments, the authors believed Machairodus formed coalitions instead of prides.

Amphimachairodus hezhengensis also has pathological evidence to suggest gregariousness due to evidence of healed pathological forepaw. A. giganteus from China housed by the Babiarz Institute of Paleontological Studies is an older individual with a broken canine, worn from usage after the break. However, the individual died of a severe nasal infection, an injury that a social predator would have had a better chance of healing, so the skull can be interpreted in different ways.

In the case of Smilodon, a large number of individuals from the La Brea tar pits feature hunting injuries. In addition to injuries resulting from strain while hunting, the more severe injuries strongly suggest a social nature. Animals may have been crippled long after the injury healed, suffering swollen ankles, prominent limps, and limited mobility that persisted for years. One such case displays a subadult suffering a shattered pelvis that healed. The specimen would barely have been able to use the damaged limb and would have limped slowly, favoring the other three legs, completely unable to hunt on its own. A 2021 paper found a Smilodon specimen that suffered from hip dysplasia at a young age. Despite that, it survived to adulthood, which the authors argued wouldn't be possible without some social grouping, as it wouldn't have the ability hunt or defend its territory. In addition, evidence of individuals with dental injuries eating softer flesh than uninjured individuals and the long period of survival from these injuries suggest gregariousness in Smilodon.

=== Rebuttals ===
The question of sociality is still controversial. Strong support for the traditional concept of a solitary Smilodon is found in its brain. Most social predators, including humans, grey wolves, and lions, have brains that are slightly larger than those of their solitary relatives. Smilodon had a relatively small brain, suggesting less ability for complex cooperative behaviors, such as hunting in groups. In addition, the best explanation for a solitary animal healing from serious wounds is that cats build up metabolic reserves that can be used in times of need. The audio test for the sociality of Smilodon, has also been questioned by an expert. The author argued the negligence of body mass, intelligence, the lack of visual and olfactory lures, and assuming the La Brea tar pits ecosystem was similar to the African savanna.

However, some of these arguments have been questioned by other experts. The original authors of the 2009 study argued even though the playback and tar pits wouldn't be identical there's no evidence that it would overturn their hypothesis. In addition, the abundance of the seemingly intelligent dire wolf calls into question if intelligence would play a role in avoiding the tar pits. But the authors don't deny the possibility of Smilodon being solitary in some of its distribution. In addition, studies have found no evidence of brain size and sociality in felids. Another counter argument against the rebuttal is that solitary felids that are highly sexually dimorphic, such as leopards, tend to die from serious injuries before they get the chance to heal. Lions, while also very sexually dimorphic, overcome this issue by forming prides, which increases their survival rate when it comes to serious injuries.

== Functionality of the sabers ==
=== Stabbing ===
It has been suggested that machairodonts used their saber teeth during hunting, grappling an animal, opening its mouth, and swinging its head down with enough force to puncture the animal's skin and flesh. It was once suggested that the saber teeth were used much like a knife. The canines seemed, initially, as tools of great power and devastating ability, used for crushing vertebrae, or for tearing open armored animals such as glyptodonts.

However, teeth are made of unsupported enamel, and would have been easily broken against hard material such as bone. It has also been argued that the mandible and an inability to open the mouth very wide would have been an impediment to effective stabbing. For such reasons, this concept has been rejected by the scientific community.

=== Sexual characteristic ===
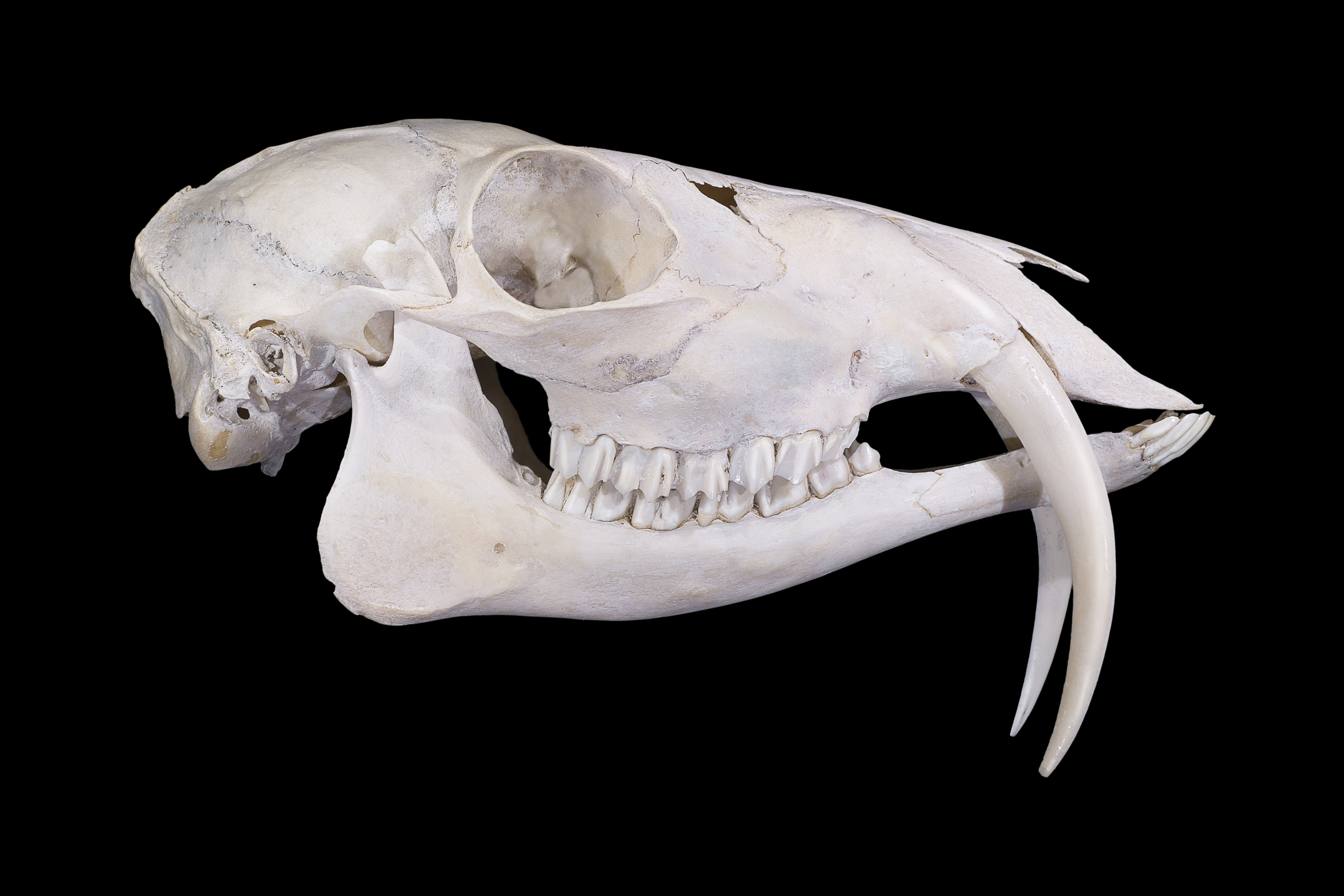
The skull of a male musk deer, displaying extreme upper canines developed only through sexual selection and otherwise completely nonfunctional

Long canines could also have been the product of sexual selection, much like the mane of a lion, and were used for courting, sexual display, and social status. Their canines are already well established as relatively fragile, and their jaw muscles not strong, so any predatory function is uncertain.

However, when a trait is adopted to enhance sexual attraction, typically only one sex, usually males, display the feature. In all machairodont species, both males and females have these canines and, with only minor exceptions as in Machairodus, are shaped similarly. There is typically also a size difference between sexes, but male and female machairodonts appear to have been the same sizes. Also, this level of sexual selection seems extreme given an individual would be left severely impaired in eating and general function.

=== Scavenging ===
One suggestion is that most machairodonts were scavengers. This leaves the canines not functional for the most part, and is often coupled with the hypothesis of sexual selection. Many modern carnivores scavenge to a greater or lesser degree. A strong sense of smell and good hearing could have helped find carcasses or steal the kills of other predators, such as dire wolves or short-faced bears, and sprinting would not have been needed, as is seen in the stocky conformation of most machairodonts.

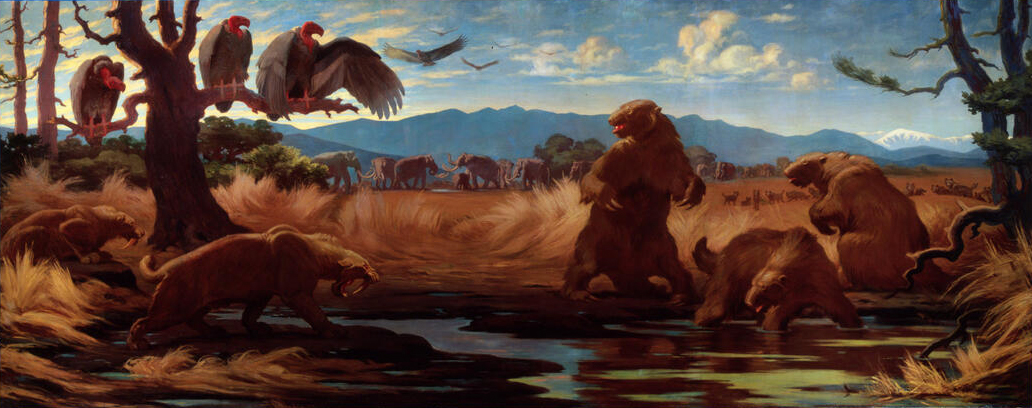
La Brea Tar Pits fauna as depicted by Charles R. Knight with two Smilodon playing the role of opportunistic scavengers.

Many modern cats show this mixture of traits. Lions are able-bodied hunters, but will steal when they are given the opportunity. Tigers and cougars bury their kills and return later to keep eating, even days later. All cats prefer killing the sick or injured, and there is a fine line between an animal so sick it cannot move and a dead animal. The abundance of Smilodon skeletons in the La Brea Tar Pits in California supports the hypothesis, as well. The animals caught in the pits would have been dying or dead, the kind of meal a true hypercarnivore, such as a modern cheetah, would pass up. This hypothesis is the oldest, but still considered viable.

Opposition to this concept lies in many parts of the cat. The teeth are purely carnivorous, unable to grind plant material, as the omnivorous teeth of dogs and bears do. The carnassials are shaped to efficiently slice flesh, not crunch bone, as they are in the modern spotted hyena. Since both sexes bear these canines and additional modifications to the skull are present, machairodonts were likely opportunists to some degree.

=== The neck-biting hypotheses ===
A more common and widely accepted view of machairodont hunting is the throat-shearing bite. Modern cats use a throat clamp, a bite positioned around the upper section of the throat, to suffocate the prey by compressing the windpipe. Their canines serve to puncture the skin and mostly allow a better grip, and do not do any significant damage to the prey. Machairodonts, alternatively, would have caused damage if they used the same technique as their modern relatives.

The major drawback to these methods is that the large amount of blood spilled could be smelled by other nearby carnivores, such as other machairodonts or dire wolves. Predators often form competitive relationships in which dominance can shift from one species to the other, as seen in the modern lion and spotted hyena of Africa. In such situations, squabbles are not uncommon. The balance of power and dominance between these apex predators remains a mystery because of the social factor. Strength in numbers can be significant in these struggles. For example, dire wolves are thought to have traveled in small packs, and while individually subordinate, their numbers might have been sufficient to force a machairodont off a kill.

However, the cat might have been able to scavenge on kills made by dire wolves. Two solitary machairodonts would quickly develop a pecking order with the first individual dominant. Because of this uncertainty, a large part of the niche of machairodonts is still unknown. The several variations on this hypothesis all require a subdued and still animal.

==== General "bite and retreat" ====
The first hypothesis involving the sensitive neck is that the cat simply restrained the animal and then bit the neck, without much specificity to location, to cause major blood damage and then retreated to allow the animal to bleed to death. Stipulations include not biting the back of the neck where contact with vertebrae could break the teeth, but a deep bite anywhere in the neck would prove fatal.

This general bite would be used wherever it could be attained, and needs fewer predators. When compared with the belly-shearing hypothesis, one Megantereon could kill a large deer, and possibly a horse, with little danger of breaking canines. This is because the bite can be applied while the carnivore keeps its body behind the prey for the most part, avoiding flinging legs while still pressing with its body weight to keep it still. It would have been a quick bite, suiting the ambush style of stalking and hunting implied by the heavy and strong bodies of most machairodonts. It would also have been possible for a lone machairodont to wound a large prey animal in this manner, then release and follow it until it fell from shock.

The general bite-and-retreat hypothesis has been criticised because of its bloodiness and because the struggling prey would have attracted any predators and scavengers in the area. The idea that a single animal would wound, release, and follow a prey animal has been counteracted more strongly. Cats rarely walk away from prey until they have eaten their fill and it would have risked being stolen by other predators.

Xenosmilus in particular might have used this method, as all the teeth in its mouth were serrated and aligned in a way that formed a consistent cutting surface.

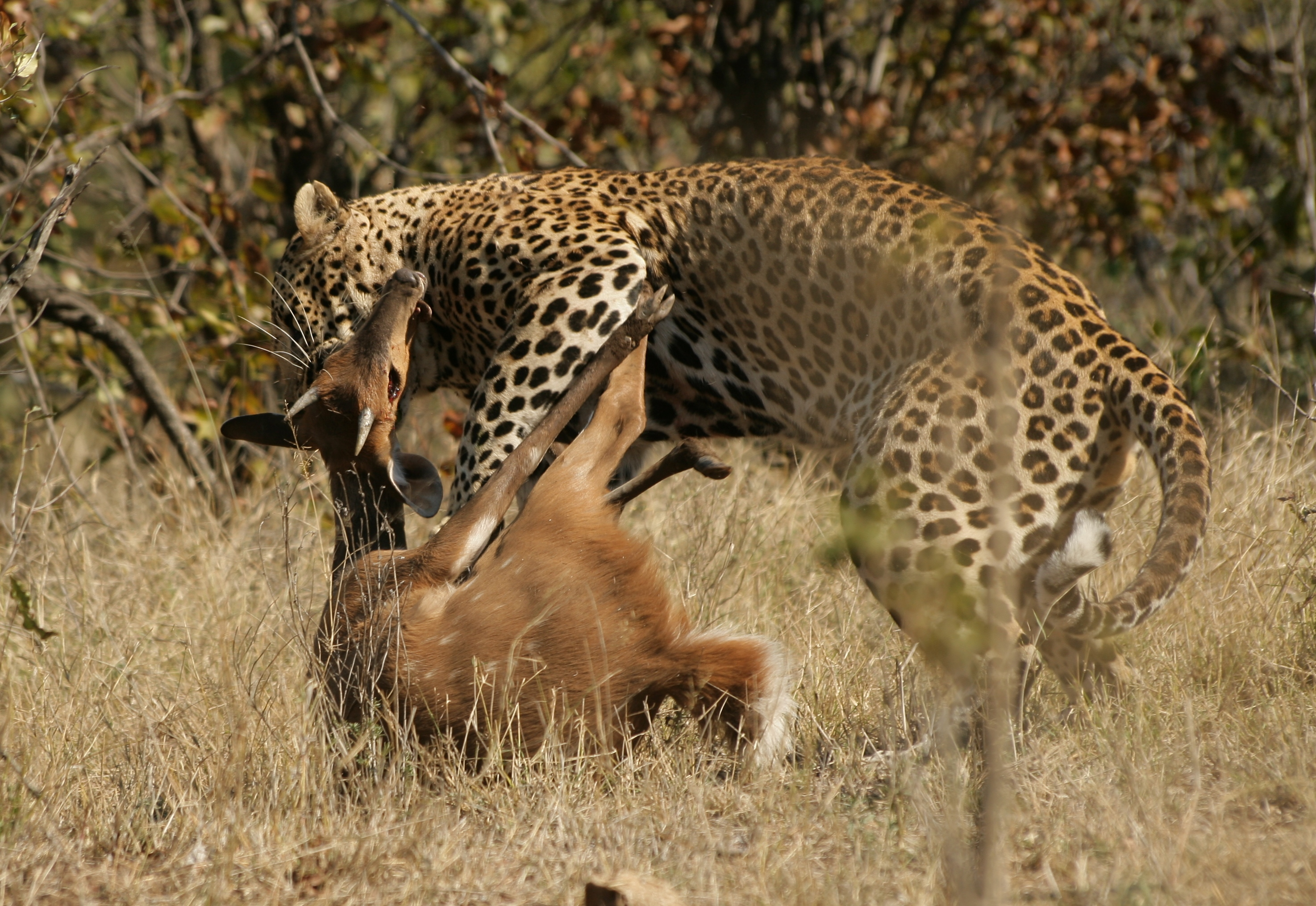
A modern leopard, Panthera pardus applying the conical-tooth equivalent of the "bite and compress" to a bushbuck.

==== "Bite and compress" ====
When the animal is wounded with a bite from a machairodont (ignoring the placement of the blood vessels, which are negligible in this hypothesis), the canines would have been inserted behind the windpipe and the premolars would have been encompassing the windpipe. This variation states that the machairodont compressed the windpipe after dealing the bite, serving to both suffocate and wound the prey animal. Puncturing large blood vessels in the throat and causing massive bleeding would hasten the death of the animal.

Modern cats, and presumably the basal genera of all cats, such as Pseudaelurus and Proailurus, use the throat clamp as a common method of dispatching prey. The suffocation would inhibit sound from the panicked prey, a method used by modern cheetahs and leopards. The wound from the canines and the lack of air would then kill the prey animal.

This method might inhibit the full effect of the wound created by the canines. Keeping the canines in the wound would stifle the blood flow from the body and could keep the animal alive longer even if the prey is unable to vocalize. There is no significant advantage to the longer canines in this method of killing when compared to the ancestral cats with their short, conical-shaped canines. If anything, the dangers to breaking teeth held in the throat of a panicked animal, even if well restrained, outweighs the possible benefits, so this method has often been viewed as improbable.

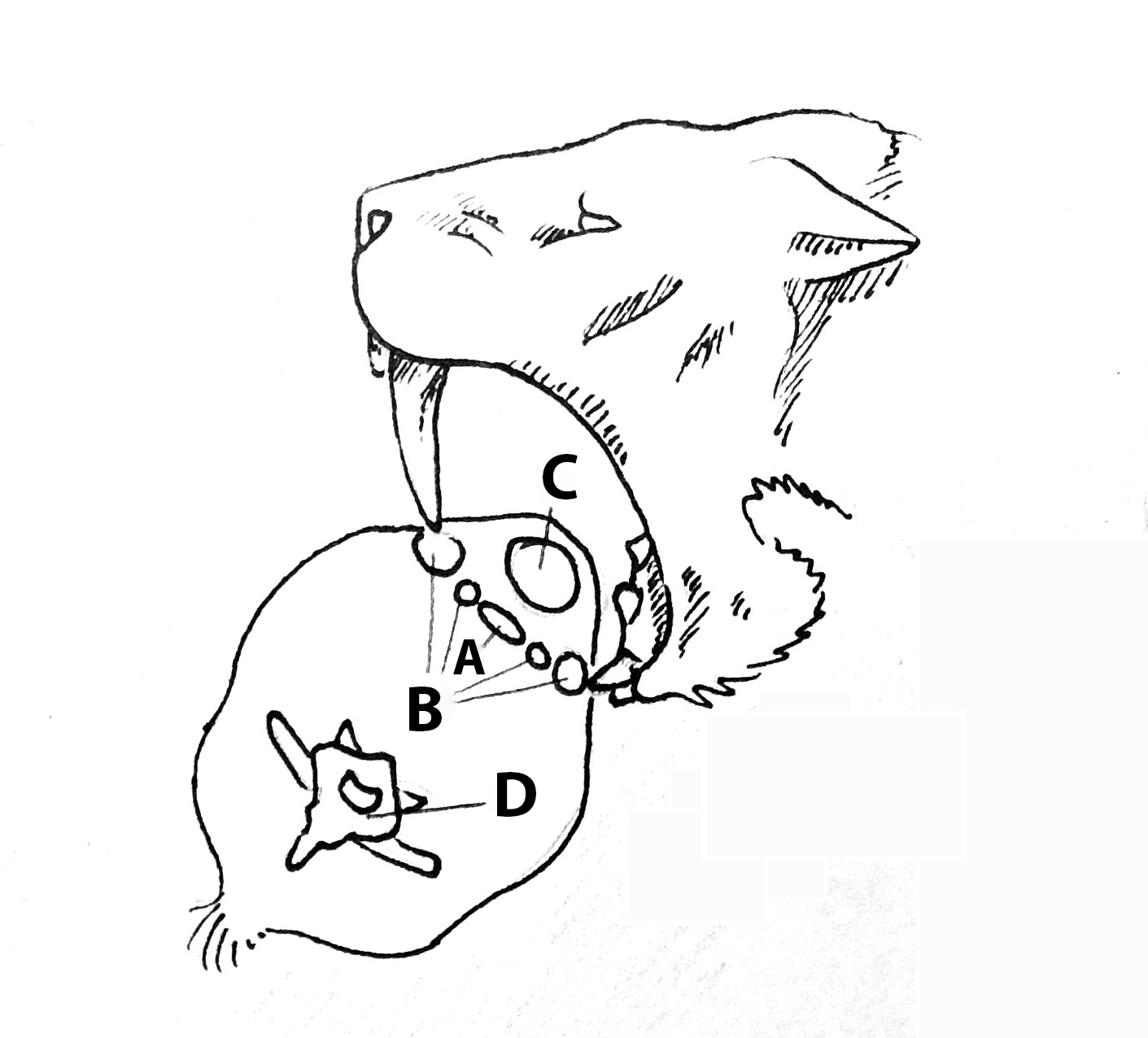
A diagram to depict the path of canines to achieve maximum damage during a careful shearing bite: Megantereon is depicted here with the neck of a horse in cross section. A – esophagus, B – four major blood vessels, C – windpipe, and D – vertebrae

==== Careful "shearing bite" ====
Another variation suggests the advanced machairodonts were highly specialized, enough to obtain the specific geometry to puncture the four major blood vessels in the throat of a prey animal in one bite. This hypothesis would include a careful bite to puncture the blood vessels, similar to, but more precise than, the bite-and-compress hypothesis, whereupon the machairodont would retreat and allow the animal to bleed to death very quickly.

Though bloody, this method would take the shortest amount of time to kill the animal out of all the hypotheses. Because of the differences of anatomy between species possibly hunted by machairodonts, the geometry needed to kill a horse, for instance, might not work for a bison. This would require the genus, or even the specific species, to be highly specialized for one type of prey animal. This might offer an explanation for their extinction, for the movement or extinction of that prey species would lead to the death of its specialist predator.

The high specialization seems an extreme and unnecessary version of a bite-and-retreat version of the throat-shear, but the suggestion that machairodont species became more specialized to hunt one prey species is usually considered acceptable so long as the misconception that the machairodont hunted 'only' that species is taken. However, this would not resolve the issue of the messiness and the loud sounds probably associated with this kind of bite. More than one individual would probably have been needed to ensure a completely subdued animal.

=== "Belly shearing" ===
In 1985, American paleontologist William Akersten suggested the shearing bite. This method of killing is similar to the style of killing seen in hyenas and canines today. A group of machairodonts captured and completely subdued a prey item, holding it still while one from the group bit into the abdominal cavity, pulled back and tore open the body.

For this technique to work, a specific sequence of motions would have to be followed. First, the animal must be completely subdued, and the predatory machairodonts must be social, so that several individuals can hold the prey animal down. The individual preparing to deliver the killing bite would open its mouth at maximum gape, and with its mandible, press up on the skin of the belly. Creating a depression where the lower canines and incisors press into the skin, a slight fold is created in the skin above the lower teeth as the mandible is shoved upward. Next, the upper canines are pressed into the skin and the muscles of the neck are used to depress the head, so instead of pulling the jaw 'up', the skull is pressed 'down' . When the canines pierce the skin, they are lowered until the gape of the mouth is roughly 45°, where the mandible is pulled up in addition to the skull still being depressed. The small flanges on the anterior portion of the mandible of most machairodonts would be used to aid the depression of the skull. When the animal's mouth is closed, it holds a thick flap of skin between its jaws, behind its canines, and the animal uses the muscles of its lower back and forequarters to pull back, tearing the flap clear of the body. This large gash, once opened, leaves intestines uncovered and arteries and veins torn. The bleeding animal would die within minutes, and the shock of repeated bites, tearing innards from the body, could speed up the process.

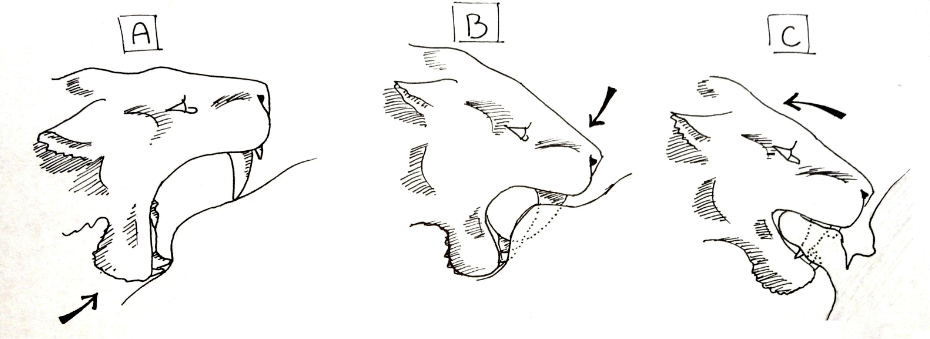
A sequence diagram of the shearing bite in the machairodont Homotherium serum: Diagram A depicts the machairodont pressing its lower canines and large incisors into the belly of the prey, creating a fold with the upward motion. Diagram B depicts the skull being depressed by the muscles of the neck, piercing the skin. Diagram C depicts the jaws clamped firmly around the section of skin and fat, and with incisors gripping the skin, the machairodont is pulling back, tearing the flap of skin from the belly.

This method allows social machairodonts to inflict large wounds on prey animals. Massive blood loss would ensue, and though bloody, the social group would be able to fend off almost any animal attracted to the area. The bite would not need to be specific, and could be repeated to hasten the death of the animal, and it is already seen in the killing methods of several extant species, such as the spotted hyena. Canines are not as likely to be broken due to the softer nature of the abdomen when compared to the throat and jerking movements are not as amplified in the abdomen as they are in the neck. The abdominal-tearing hypothesis has generally been regarded as highly plausible. In the La Brea tar pits, occurrences of broken canines in Smilodon are rare, and this less risky method might have contributed to this.

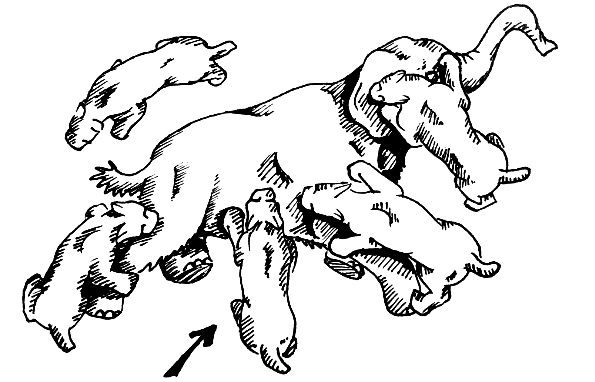
A diagram of a group of five Homotherium serum restraining an adolescent mammoth on the ground while one individual (marked with an arrow) applies the shearing bite

However, a shearing bite may have been problematic for machairodonts for several reasons. Most ungulates are highly sensitive around the belly and hindquarters, and most predators find it much easier to capture and subdue an animal similar to the domestic cow, by manipulating the head and forequarters. By lowering the animal to the ground and placing itself between the pairs of legs, a machairodont would have suffered great risk of being kicked. The power behind such a kick would easily break teeth, a mandible, or a leg, and cripple or kill the cat.

Sociability might have solved this issue by having one individual deliver the killing bite while others held the animal still. Furthermore, the diameter of the abdomen of a large ungulate such as a bison might have been too large, and the skin too taut, for a machairodont to grasp a flap of skin at all, much less tear it away from the body. A third issue with the shearing bite is that the canines would need to tear a large hole in the belly of the animal to be successful, but might instead simply flay the skin and produce two long slits. This wound may be painful and bleed, but the animal likely would not bleed to death and could still escape and survive, instead of bleeding to death.

In 2004 an experiment used a pair of mechanical aluminum jaws, cast from the CT scans of a Smilodon fatalis from the La Brea tar pits, to simulate several biting techniques possibly used by Smilodon, including the shearing bite, on a fresh domestic cow carcass. The belly of the cow was found to be too large in diameter for the canines to puncture the skin, which were instead deflected off the body, with the mandible blocking their access. However, the model pulled its jaw upward as modern cats bite, while machairodonts most likely did not, instead pressing their skulls down with the aid of their neck muscles. This flaw in the procedure might nullify the results and leave the belly-shearing hypothesis untouched.

== Notes and references ==
- Report on Barnett group's study in Current Biology August 9, 2005: Ross Barnett et al.: "Evolution of the extinct Sabretooths and the American cheetah-like cat" in Current Biology, Vol. 15, R589-R590, August 9, 2005
