= Metailurini =

Metailurini Temporal range: Middle Miocene to Early Pleistocene 13–1.4 Ma

Scientific classification
- Kingdom: Animalia
- Phylum: Chordata
- Class: Mammalia
- Order: Carnivora
- Family: Felidae
- Subfamily: †Machairodontinae
- Tribe: †Metailurini; Beaumont, 1964

Genera
- †Adelphailurus Hibbard, 1934
- †Dinofelis Zdansky, 1924
- †Fortunictis Pons-Moyà, 1987
- †Metailurus Zdansky, 1924
- †Stenailurus Crusafont-Pairo & Aguirre, 1972
- †Yoshi Spassov & Geraads, 2014
Possible members
- †Paramachaerodus
- †Promegantereon
- †Rhizosmilodon

Synonyms
- Dinofelini

Extinct tribe of carnivores

Metailurini is an extinct taxonomic tribe of large saber-toothed cats that lived in Africa, Asia, Europe, and North America from the Miocene to the Pleistocene.

The best known Metailurini genera are Dinofelis and Metailurus. Metailurini had canines longer than Neofelis, but smaller than true saber toothed cats. The teeth were also more conical than flat, so called "scimitar-toothed", having broad and mildly elongated upper canines. Like most extinct cats, the majority of species in Metailurini are known primarily from fragments. However, the systematic position and taxonomy of these creatures is now accepted as being true members of Felidae and descended from Proailurus and Pseudaelurus. Within Felidae, they had been traditionally considered to belong in Machairodontinae, albeit some have in the past proposed a relationship to Pantherinae, all phylogenetic analyses support the former classification but the monophyly of the taxon itself might not be supported.

== History ==
Metailurini was first named as a tribe by Beaumont in 1964 for the genera Metailurus, Therailurus, and tentatively Dinofelis. Stenailurus was described in 1972 and assigned to the group, which the authors elevated to a subfamily Metailurinae. In a 1983 review of machairodontine classification, Berta & Galiano added Adelphailurus and Pontosmilus to the tribe, though subsequent papers consider Pontosmilus a junior synonym of the machairodontin Paramachaerodus, and Therailurus a junior synonym of Dinofelis. A further genus was added in 1987 with the description of Fortunictis.

The most recent addition was the genus Yoshi in 2014. Recent analysis have considered Promegantereon, Paramachaerodus, and Rhizosmilodon as possible members within the tribe.

== Classification ==
Tribe †Metailurini
Genus	Species	Image
†Adelphailurus Hibbard, 1934	†A. kansensis	
†Dinofelis Zdansky, 1924	†D. aronoki; †D. barlowi; †D. cristata; †D. darti; †D. diastemata; †D. paleoonca; †D. petteri; †D. piveteaui; †D. werdelini	
†Metailurus Zdansky, 1924	†M. boodon; †M. major; †M. mongoliensis; †M. ultimus; †M. hengduanshanensis	
†Stenailurus Crusafont-Pairo & Aguirre, 1972	†S. telihardi	
†Fortunictis Pons-Moyà 1987	†F. acerensis	
†Yoshi Spassov and Geraads, 2014	†Y. garevskii; †Y. minor; †Y. faie; †Y. obscura; †Y. youngdengensis	
