= Yoshi (genus) =

Yoshi Temporal range: Late Miocene

Scientific classification
- Kingdom: Animalia
- Phylum: Chordata
- Class: Mammalia
- Order: Carnivora
- Family: Felidae
- Subfamily: †Machairodontinae
- Tribe: †Metailurini
- Genus: †Yoshi; Spassov and Geraads, 2015

Type species
- Yoshi garevskii Spassov and Geraads, 2015

Other species
- †Yoshi faie Jiangzuo et al., 2022; †Yoshi minor (Zdansky, 1924); †Yoshi obscura (Hendey, 1974); †Yoshi yongdengensis Jiangzuo et al., 2022

Synonyms
- Synonyms of Yoshi minor: Metailurus minor Hensel, 1862; Metailurus minor Zdansky, 1924; Pikermia parvula Kretzoi, 1938; Synonyms of Y. obscura: Felis obscura Hendley, 1974; Adelphailurus obscura Turner, 1999; Megantereon obscura Morales et al., 2005; Metailurus obscurus Werdelin, 2006

Extinct genus of carnivorans

Yoshi is an extinct genus of machairodontine sabertooth cat in the tribe Metailurini. Its remains were first discovered in Pikermi, Greece, and were assigned by Reinhold Friedrich Hensel to Machairodus (under the new species M. parvulus). In 1938, Miklós Kretzoi assigned it to a new genus, Pikermia. Subsequently, it was realised that the Greek taxon was closely related to another from China, then called Parapseudailurus minor, and both were synonymised. In 2014, a new genus, Yoshi, was erected to encompass the two, resurrecting Y. minor as a valid species. As M. parvulus was a nomen dubium, a new species, Yoshi garevskii, was designated as the type. In the intervening years, three more species have been assigned to the genus: Y. faie, Y. obscura, and Y. yongdengenesis.

In some regards, such as the shape of its skull, Yoshi was convergent with cheetahs, and it was originally suggested that it may have been more cursorial (adapted for fast running) than other metailurines. However, the anatomy of its postcranial skeleton, such as the fact that its hind limbs were longer than its forelimbs, suggest that, while probably somewhat cursorial, it was not to the same extent as cheetahs. Yoshi instead had several adaptations for leaping, like many modern cats. It appears to have frequented open habitats more often than contemporary machairodonts.

== Taxonomy ==
=== Early history ===
In 1862, Reinhold Friedrich Hensel described the species Machairodus parvulus based poorly preserved skulls from Pikermi, Greece, which he believed came from an animal the size of a lynx. In 1938, Miklós Kretzoi reassigned M. parvulus to a new genus, Pikermia, creating the new combination Pikermia parvula. In the same paper, he suggested that "Metailurus" minor, from China, could be reassigned to a genus of its own, Parapseudailurus. However, in 1951, Erich Thenius suggested that P. minor represented the same taxon as Hensel's M. parvulus, a conclusion also reached by G. D. Beaumont in 1961, who went as far as assigning a mandible from Iran to the latter. Consequently, P. minor was treated as a synonym of M. parvulus by subsequent authors. Further material from southern/southeastern Europe and Iran was assigned to M. parvulus over the years, though much of it is incomplete.

=== Reclassification as a new genus ===
In 2015, Nikolai Spassov and Denis Geraads published a paper discussing the taxonomy of the aforementioned taxa. They concluded that Hensel's Machairodus parvulus was a nomen dubium, due to the generally fragmented nature of all material assigned to the species. All of the remains were assigned to a new genus, Yoshi, named after Spassov's pet cat. Two species were assigned: the type species, Y. garevskii, and Y. minor, the taxon discussed by Kretzoi. In 2022, two new species Yoshi faie and Yoshi yongdengensis were proposed based on fossils found in northeastern China. The next year, a paper discussing the predatory mammals of the Langebaanweg locality in South Africa assigned a fifth species, Y. obscura, to the genus. Y. obscura had previously been assigned to Adelphailurus, Felis, Megantereon, and Metailurus. The authors noted that the very small taxon Tchadailurus adei seemed very close to the genus Yoshi, though a synonymy was not proposed in the text.

Below is a cladogram depicting the phylogenetic analysis from that paper:

- Metailurini
  - Paramachaerodus ogygia
  - - - Metailurus major
      - - Paramachaerodus transasiaticus
        - Paramachaerodus yinliangi
    - - Yoshi
        - - Y. garevskii
          - Y. minor
        - - Y. faie
          - - Y. obscura
            - Y. yongdengensis
      - - - Paramachaerodus schlosseri
          - - Metailurus ultimus
            - Rhizosmilodon fitae
        - Dinofelis
          - D. werdelini
          - - D. cristatus
            - - D. piveteaui
              - - D. barlowi
                - D. petteri

== Description ==
Yoshi was a fairly large metailurine. In the paper describing it, Y. garevskii was described as being intermediate in size between a lynx and a cheetah, though it was closer to the latter, with an estimated body mass of 35–40 kg (77–88 lb). The largest, Y. yongdengensis, fell within a similar size range. Though too fragmentary for precise estimates, Y. obscura is believed to have been the smallest, roughly the size of a female leopard.

=== Skull and dentition ===
The skull length of the Y. garevskii type specimen, KAR-69, was 17.02 cm (6.70 in) in length. The skull of Y. garevskii is short, broad and high, and is morphologically quite similar to that of cheetahs, with a facial region that was similarly long and sloping. However, that of Y. minor was longer, and appears to have been less sloping. The frontal area in Y. garevskii bulged outwards, similar to cheetahs and snow leopards, while that of Y. minor was somewhat flatter. The two species' skulls also differed in that the muzzle of Y. garevskii was steeper, and the orbits (eye sockets) were elevated on the skull. On the frontal bone, the zygomatic processes are short and rounded, like those of cheetahs. The zygomatic arches are broad and thick, though differ from modern large felids in that their bases are narrower.

Yoshi's dentition was dissimilar to that of other machairodonts. The upper canines were short and uncrenulated. The lower canines, too, were small, and hardly surpassed the level of the upper incisors' alveoli while the jaw was closed. The diastema (gap) between the canines and the cheek teeth (premolars and molars) was fairly small. The third upper and lower premolars lacked a mesial accessory cuspid. The first upper molar was small and button-shaped, while the equivalent lower molar bore a distinct talonid.

=== Postcranial skeleton ===
The postcranial skeleton of Yoshi is best known from a specimen from Greece, initially assigned to "Metailurus parvulus" (Y. garevskii). The specimen consists of a mandible, most limb elements, some cervical (neck) and thoracic (upper back) vertebrae, and ribs. The fossa for the teres major covers half of the scapula's posterior (rearward) border, and is well defined by a prominent crest. The head of the humerus is almost circular in outline. The lateral compression of the humeral shaft is comparable to that of leopards, being thicker than that of lions and cheetahs. The crest at the posteromedial (rear middle) margin of the ulna was well-developed, providing a strong insertion point for the large head of the triceps brachii. Unlike other machairodontines (with the exception of Homotherium), the trochlear notch lacked a groove on its superomedial (above and at the midline) edge.

== Palaeobiology ==
Initially, based on similarities between Yoshi and modern cheetahs, it was suggested that the former may have been cursorial to a similar degree to the latter. However, analysis of the postcranial skeleton indicates that this cursoriality was only moderate: the ovoid shaft cross-section of the femoral shaft, greater in diameter transversely (across) than anteroposteriorly (from front to back), which is a trait associated with reduced cursoriality. Furthermore, the shaft bows anteriorly (forwards), and the hind limbs were somewhat longer than the forelimbs, typical of felids with leaping abilities. Overall, Yoshi appears to have been intermediate between cursorial and non-cursorial machairodonts, and was more well-adapted to open environments than larger contemporaries, such as Paramachaerodus.

== Distribution and palaeoenvironment ==
Specimens assigned to Yoshi have been recovered from Greece, Spain, Ukraine, China, and Iran, though with the exception of the Greek and Chinese fossils, most are too fragmentary to confidently assign to the genus. The most complete postcranial skeleton of Yoshi is known from the K1 locality of northern Greece, which also preserves fossils from the suid Microstonyx, the giraffids Helladotherium, Palaeotragus, and Samotherium, the antelopes Gazella and Tragoportax, the equid Hipparion, the chalicothere Ancylotherium, the aardvark Orycteropus, and possible remains from the hyena Adcrocuta and the elephant Choerolophodon. The Chinese Yoshi species come from the end-Miocene Xingjiawan locality, a humid environment consisting open and forested biomes. The Xingjiawan preserves the elephant Stegodon, the hyaenids Adcrocuta, Hyaenictitherium and Ictitherium, and the felids Amphimachairodus and Pristifelis.
