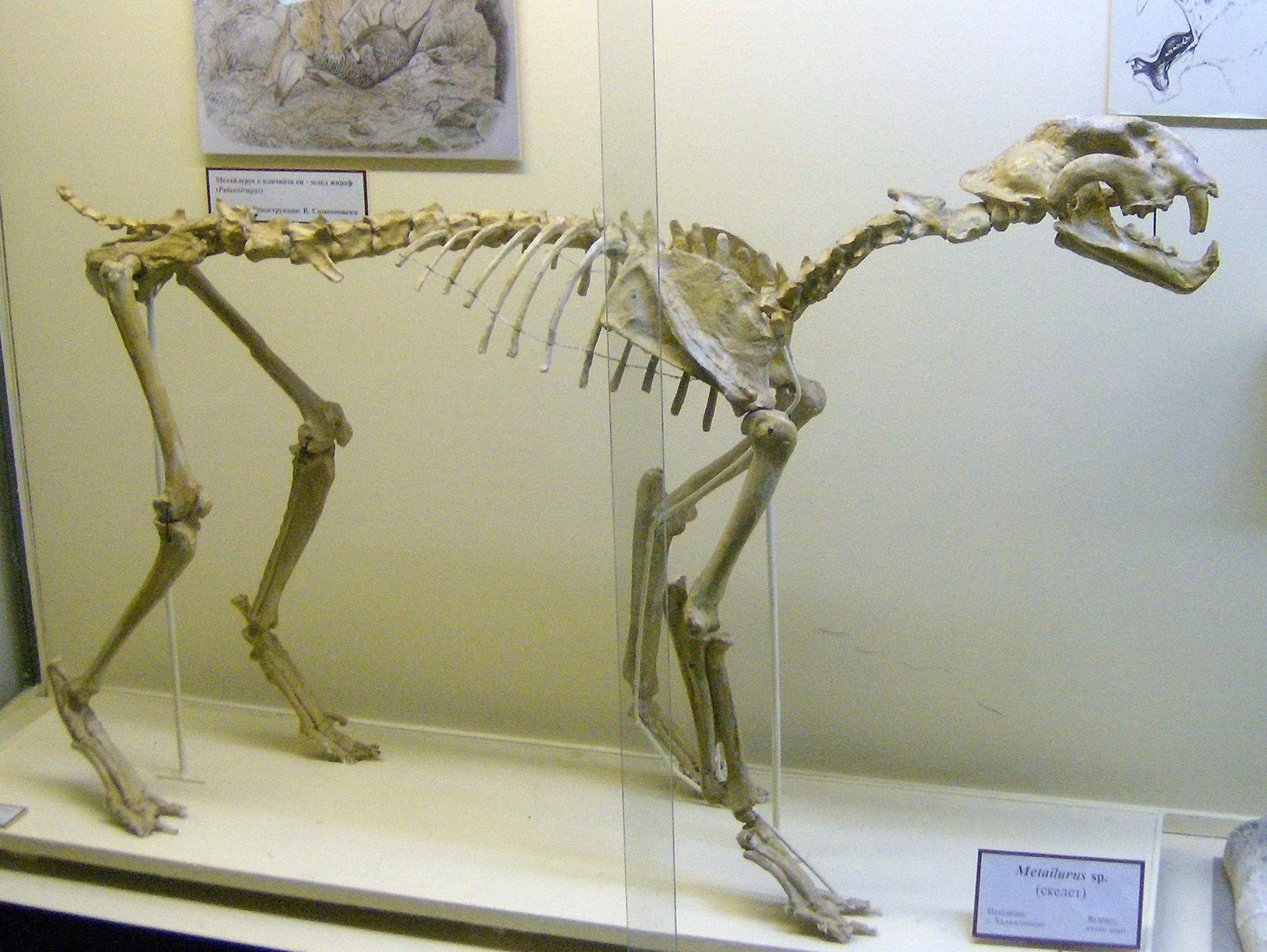
- Metailurus skeleton

Scientific classification
- Kingdom: Animalia
- Phylum: Chordata
- Class: Mammalia
- Order: Carnivora
- Family: Felidae
- Subfamily: †Machairodontinae
- Tribe: †Metailurini
- Genus: †Metailurus; Zdansky, 1924

Type species
- Metailurus major Zdansky, 1924

Other Species
- †M. boodon Belyaeva, 1948; †M. major Zdansky, 1924; †M. mongoliensis Colbert, 1939; †M. ultimus Li, 2014; †M. hengduanshanensis Zong et al, 1996
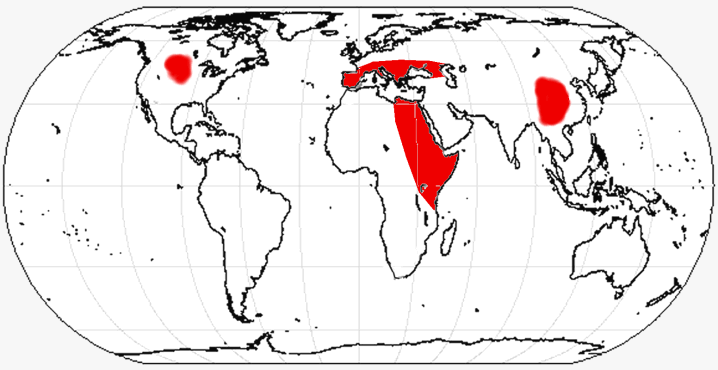
- Range of Metailurus based on fossil record

= Metailurus =

Metailurus Temporal range: Middle Miocene to Late Pliocene (Serravallian-Piacenzian) 13–3.0 Ma

Extinct genus of carnivores

Metailurus is a genus of saber-toothed cat in the family Felidae, and belonging to the tribe Metailurini, which occurred in North America, Eurasia and Africa from the Middle Miocene to the Late Pliocene.

== History and taxonomy ==
The genus Metailurus was described by Zdansky in 1924 for the two species Metailurus major and Metailurus minor.

Metailurus mongoliensis was described in 1939.

Metailurus boodon was described in 1948.

Metailurus hengduanshanensis was described in 1996.

Metailurus ultimus was described in 2014.

Metailurus minor was reassigned to the felid genus Yoshi in 2015.

== Description ==
The canines of Metailurus are longer than those of even the clouded leopard, but significantly shorter than true saber teeth, and more conical than bladed. A partial skeleton found in the Turolian site of Kerassia 1 consists of the jawbone, the anterior and posterior limb bone elements, and some sternal bones and some vertebrae. This is the most complete known of the species. Its dental material is comparative to those specimens from Pikermi, Chomateri, and China. The presence of elongated posterior limbs indicate that it had developed jumping skills.
