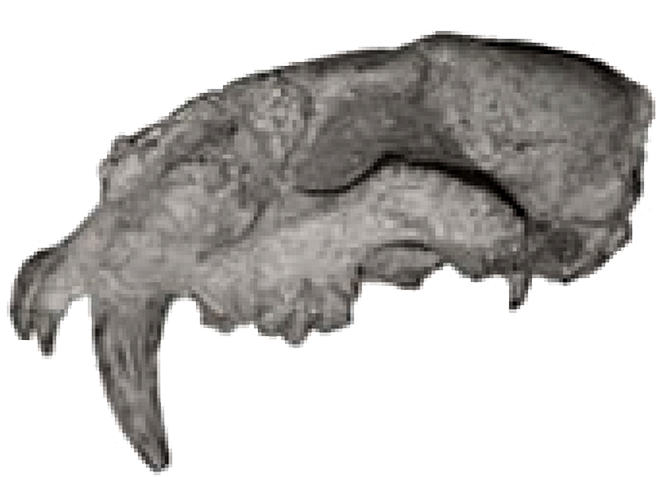

Scientific classification
- Kingdom: Animalia
- Phylum: Chordata
- Class: Mammalia
- Infraclass: Placentalia
- Order: Carnivora
- Family: Felidae
- Subfamily: †Machairodontinae
- Genus: †Taowu; Jiangzuo, Werdelin, and Sun et al., 2022
- Species: †T. liui

Binomial name
- †Taowu liui Jiangzuo, Werdelin, and Sun et al., 2022

= Taowu liui =

Taowu liui Temporal range: Early Pleistocene (Gelasian) 2.5 Ma

Extinct genus of carnivores

Taowu is an extinct genus of machairodonts, a type of saber-toothed cat. It lived during the Early Pleistocene about 2.5 million years ago in East Asia. So far, only one skull is known, found in northern China. Based on this, a relatively small representative of the saber-toothed cats can be reconstructed, which only reached the size of a present-day leopard. In its dentition characteristics, it mediates between phylogenetic older forms such as Amphimachairodus and younger members such as Homotherium. The genus was scientifically described in 2022, but the find material was recovered as early as the 1930s.

== Description ==
Taowu was a rather small representative of the saber-toothed cats. It reached about the size of a present-day leopards. Found so far is a nearly complete skull of 23.5 cm length and 13.4 cm width, measured across the zygomatic arches. Only the articular surface on the occipital bone is missing from this one. In top view, the skull was relatively slender, comparatively narrower than in Homotherium or Xenosmilus, and possessed a rounded snout region. The snout did not taper behind the canine, but continuously increased in width posteriorly. Likewise, a cranial narrowing behind the orbits was only rather weakly pronounced. In lateral view, the frontal line showed a gentle uparching, and the nasal opening was recessed and concavely indented relative to the premaxilla. The incisor row thus appeared much more prominent than in, for example, Amphimachairodus. In plan view, the frontal area was broad. The nasal bones widened posteriorly. The infraorbital foramen was at the level of the fourth premolar, as was the anterior edge of the orbit. Bony ridges attached to the frontal bone, which united to form a parietal crest. The zygomatic arch bulged strongly dorsally. On the underside of the skull, the tympanic bulla was markedly distended. As a diagnostic feature, the glenoid fossa was on a raised platform, more prominent than in Amphimachairodus, and was very wide. The anterior palatal window was at the level of the canine, and the largest posterior one was at the level of the third premolar. The upper dentition consisted of three incisors, one canine, two premolars, and two molars per half of the jaw. The incisors formed a closed arch and increased in size from the inside to the outside. An additional cusp existed on the third incisor. The canine tooth protruded up to 7.4 cm from the jaw and was flat blade-shaped in cross-section. Both the anterior and posterior edges showed fine serration. Adjacent to the canine, a diastema separated the anterior from posterior dentition. Unlike some other saber-toothed cats such as Lokotunjailurus, the second premolar was absent. The third and thus most anterior premolar was not reduced in size, which differs from Homotherium, Lokotunjailurus, or Xenosmilus. Overall, the tooth appeared elongated at a length of just under 2 cm, as did the much larger posterior premolar, which grew to a good 3.4 cm in length. The typical pointed cusps, the para-, meta-, and protoconus, existed on this, the latter only being small in formation. The anterior shear edge, the parastyle, had an elongate shape, from which the anteriormost section, the preparastyle, stood out only imperceptibly.

== Fossil finds ==
The only fossil find of Taowu to date comes from Fancun, a locality about 36 km east of the township of Taigu, which in turn is part of the city of Jinzhong in the Chinese Shanxi province. The site and other areas in the region were excavated as early as the 1930s by American paleontologist Childs Frick. The various localities yielded numerous fossil materials, including several carnivores such as Homotherium as another representative of the saber-toothed cats, an extinct form of the lynx as well as the badger, Xenocyon as a member of the dogs, and the hyena Pachycrocuta. In addition, early relatives of modern horses also appeared. Especially the latter mentioned imply a predominant position in the Pleistocene, with the lower section being more likely.

== Classifications ==
Taowu is a genus from the extinct subfamily of saber-toothed cats (Machairodontinae) within the family of cats (Felidae). The saber-toothed cats represent an ancient branch of cats, which according to molecular genetics studies, forms the sister group of today's big cats and small cats. Their separation from the common branch occurred about 20 million years ago in the Lower Miocene. The feature that gave saber-toothed cats their name is their significantly enlarged canine teeth. However, this shows certain variations within the kinship community, which led to the establishment of different subgroups. Here, the Machairodontini have saber-like canines, the Smilodontini have dagger-like canines, and the Metailurini have less conspicuously large canines. With its leopard-like body size, Taowu represents one of the smallest representatives of the saber-toothed cats of the Pliocene and Pleistocene. In overall dentition, the form can be assumed to be somewhat intermediate between the more primitive Amphimachairodus and the terminal form Homotherium within the Machairodontini. This is recognizable, for example, from the third premolars, which are only slightly reduced in size. On the other hand, the anteriorly shifted incisors also suggest certain more modern characteristics.

The skull underlying the genus Taowu was found as early as the 1930s in Fancun, part of the city of Jinzhong, in the Chinese Shanxi province. It was mentioned in individual publications in which various researchers classified it as belonging to Machairodus, but a precise characteristic description was not developed. Studies in 2022 necessitated a reevaluation. Jiangzuo Qigao and colleagues then established Taowu as a distinct form of saber-toothed cat in their scientific first description and presented the skull in detail. The generic name Taowu refers to the creature of the same name in Chinese mythology. Its striking characteristics include powerful tusks reminiscent of saber teeth. The species T. liui, introduced together with the genus, uses its epithet to honor the Chinese scientist Liu Jinyi, who had made significant contributions to the study of Pleistocene East Asian predators.

=== Phylogeny ===
Below is a phylogenetic tree of the Machairodontinae, based on the work of Jiangzuo and colleagues (2022).

- Machairodontinae
  - - - Machairodontini
        - - - - - Homotheriina
                  - - Xenosmilus
                    - Ischyrosmilus
                  - Homotherium
                - - "Machairodus"
                  - Taowu
              - Adeilosmilus
            - Amphimachairodus
          - Lokotunjailurus
        - Machairodus
      - - Smilodontini
          - Paramachairodus orientalis
          - - Megantereon
            - Smilodon
        - - Paramachairodus maximiliani
          - - Dinofelis
            - Rhizosmilodon
    - Metailurini
      - Yoshi
      - - Metailurus
        - Promegantereon
