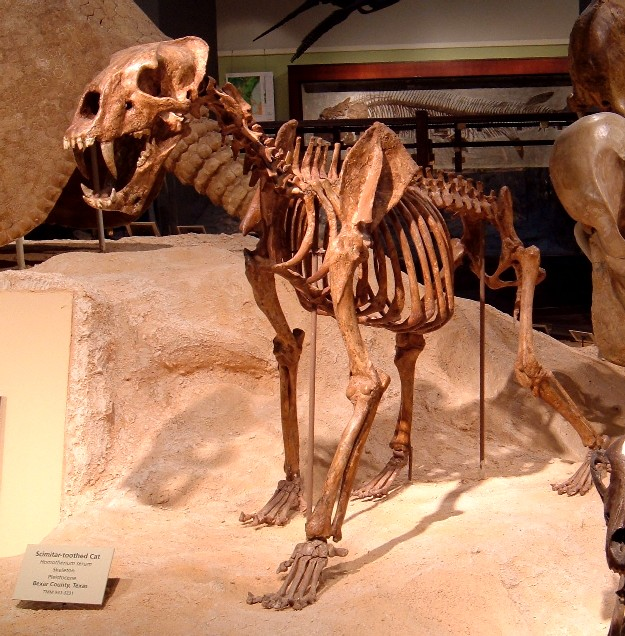
- Skeleton of Homotherium serum from Friesenhahn cave, Texas Memorial Museum, University of Texas at Austin, Austin, Texas

Scientific classification
- Kingdom: Animalia
- Phylum: Chordata
- Class: Mammalia
- Order: Carnivora
- Family: Felidae
- Subfamily: †Machairodontinae
- Tribe: †Homotherini; Fabrini, 1890

Genera
- †Amphimachairodus; †Homotherium; †Lokotunjailurus; †Longchuansmilus; †Machairodus; †Nimravides; †Taowu; †Xenosmilus

= Homotherini =

Homotherini Temporal range: Middle Miocene to Late Pleistocene 12.5–0.012 Ma

Extinct tribe of carnivores

Homotherini (Machairodontini) is a tribe (or subtribe) of saber-toothed cats of the family Felidae (true cats). The tribe is commonly known as scimitar-toothed cats. These saber-toothed cats were endemic to North America, Europe, Asia, Africa, and South America from the Miocene to Pleistocene living from 12.5 Ma until c. 12,000 years ago. The evolutionary relationship between the tribes Homotherini and Machairodontini causes paleontologists to classify Homotherini either as a subtribe of Machairodontini or as a member of the same tribe, often using either name interchangeably.

== Description ==
Compared to the usually massively built dirk-toothed phenotype, apparent in Smilodon, Megantereon and the feliform Barbourofelis (just to list a few), their upper canines were smaller than those of equally sized cats of that phenotype, but they had serrated edges. The scimitar-toothed phenotype has also evolved independently in other mammal families.

The subtribe Homotherini evolved towards a body style more fit for running, with lighter builds and long legs seen in the genera Lokotunjailurus and Homotherium as well as larger noses for better respiration during pursuit.

The subtribe Machairodontini retained features more similar to extant pantherines, with shorter legs and longer tails than Homotherins, while maintaining saber tooth features such as a longer neck and upper canine teeth that were larger and bladed. Machairodontins had heavier bodies with many species reaching the size of the dirk-toothed cats.

== Evolution ==
Based on mitochondrial DNA sequences extracted from fossils, the lineage of Homotherium is estimated to have diverged from that of Smilodon about 18 Ma ago.

The scimitar tooth form was used to assist in the hunting of herbivorous megafauna. With its hyper-sharp and serrated form, it was perfect for ripping flesh off downed prey. However, if this tooth came into contact with bone, it could get caught, its serrations could be worn off, or it could even be broken completely, thus leaving the organism without a food source, leading to starvation and death.

The elongated teeth in scimitar-toothed felines and other mammals are presumed to have been an advantage in hunting large megafauna. Whether they initially emerged under this selection pressure or originated as a sexual dimorphic trait has been a matter of debate. The argument for sexual dimorphic origins stems from the fact that in mammals sexual dimorphic traits manifest as tools for males to compete for females. It is believed that the scimitar-tooth and the dirk-tooth were originally only in males for use in competition but then with the rise of mega-herbivores it became favorable for females to take up the trait as well. The natural selection side of the debate argues that the scimitar and dirk-tooth both evolved because of the unfilled niche of predation of megaherbivores so the trait evolved to take advantage of said niche.

== Classification ==
Tribe †HomotheriniTribe †Machairodontini
| Tribe | Genus | Species | Image |
†Homotherini
| †Homotherini | †Homotherium Fabrini, 1890 | †H. ischyrus; †H. latidens; †H. serum; †H. venezuelensis? | |
| †Homotherini | †Xenosmilus Martin et al., 2000 | †X. hodsonae | |
| †Homotherini | †Lokotunjailurus Werdelin 2003 | †L. emageritus; †L. fanonei; †L. chinsamyae | |
| †Homotherini | †Amphimachairodus Kretzoi, 1929 | †A. alvarezi; †A. coloradensis; †A. giganteus; †A. hezhengensis; †A. horribilis; †A. kurteni | |
| †Homotherini | †Nimravides Kitts 1958 | †N. catacopsis; †N. galiani; †N. hibbardi; †N. pedionomus; †N. thinobates | |
†Machairodontini
| †Machairodontini | †Machairodus Kaup, 1833 | †M. alberdiae; †M. aphanistus; †M. laskerevi; †M. robinsoni | |
| †Machairodontini | †Hemimachairodus Koenigswald, 1974 | †H. zwierzyckii | |
| †Machairodontini | †Longchuansmilus Jiangzuo et al 2022 | †L. xingyongi | |
| †Machairodontini | †Adeilosmilus Jiangzuo, Werdelin, Sun et al 2022 | †A. kabir | |
| †Machairodontini | †Taowu Jiangzuo, Werdelin, Sun et al 2022 | †T. liui | |
| †Machairodontini | †Miomachairodus Schmidt-Kittler 1976 | †M. pseudaeluroides | |

=== Phylogeny ===
The phylogenetic relationships of Homotherini are shown in the following cladogram:

- †Homotherini
  - †Amphimachairodus
    - - †Amphimachairodus kurteni
    - †Amphimachairodus alvarezi
    - †Amphimachairodus coloradensis
    - †Amphimachairodus giganteus
  - †Nimravides
    - †Nimravides catacopsis
    - †Nimravides galiani
    - †Nimravides hibbardi
    - †Nimravides pedionomus
    - †Nimravides thinobates
  - - †Lokotunjailurus
      - †Lokotunjailurus emageritus
      - †Lokotunjailurus fanonei
    - - †Xenosmilus
        †Xenosmilus hodsonae
      - †Xenosmilus venezuelensis
      - †Homotherium
        - †Homotherium ischyrus
        - †Homotherium latidens
        - †Homotherium crenatidens
        - - †Homotherium serum
