= Canis cedazoensis =

Canis cedazoensis Temporal range: Pleistocene

Scientific classification
- Domain: Eukaryota
- Kingdom: Animalia
- Phylum: Chordata
- Class: Mammalia
- Order: Carnivora
- Family: Canidae
- Genus: Canis
- Species: †C. cedazoensis

Binomial name
- †Canis cedazoensis Mooser and Dalquest 1975
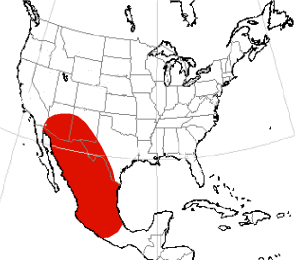
- Range of Canis cedazoensis based on fossil finds

Extinct species of carnivore

Canis cedazoensis is an extinct species of smaller canid which was endemic to North America during the Pleistocene epoch, 1.8 Ma—300,000 years ago.

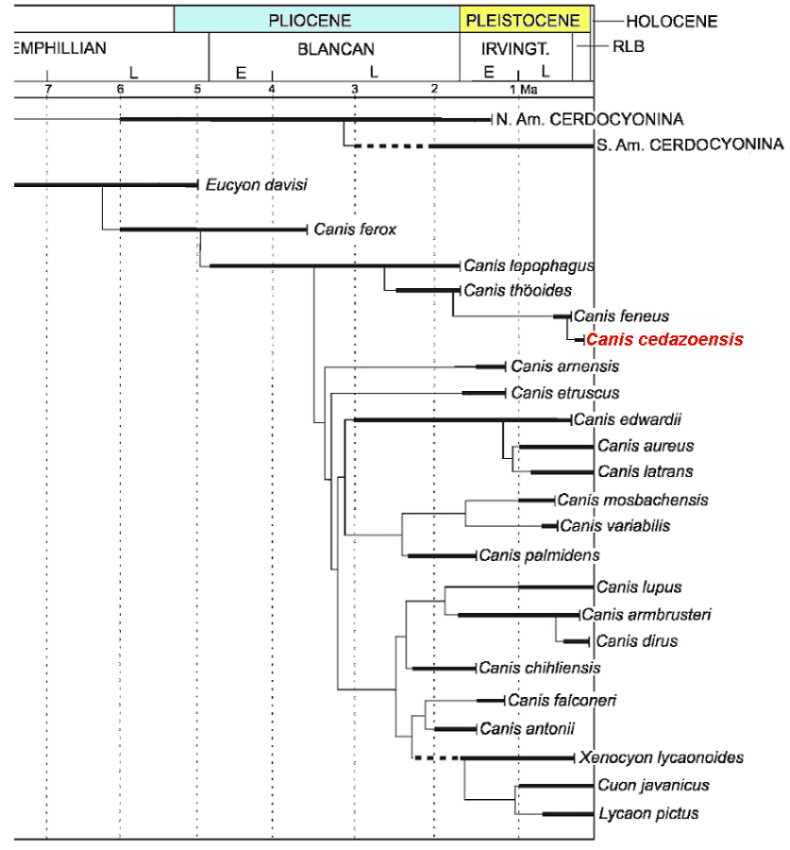
Timeline highlighting Canis cedazoensis in red

The morphology and dentition of C. cedazoensis suggests a jackal-like animal that was more hypercarnivorous than any current jackal. C. cedazoensis is close in size to the living golden jackal. It' appears to form an endemic clade with Canis thooides and Canis feneus, and is possibly descended from Canis lepophagus.

C. cedazoensis would have shared its habitat with both Armbruster's wolf and the dire wolf for approximately 1.8 million years before becoming extinct. Other competitors would have been the sabretooth cats Smilodon and Homotherium.
