= Lars Werdelin =

Swedish paleontologist

Lars Werdelin (born 1955) is a Swedish paleontologist specializing in the evolution of mammalian carnivores. His areas of scientific interest include the evolutionary interaction of carnivores and hominins in Africa, as well as the evolution and phylogeny of carnivore clades such as the Hyaenodonta, the Machairodontinae, the lynxes and the Hyaenidae.

He received his Ph.D. from Stockholm University in 1981. He is responsible for describing the Machairodontine genus Lokotunjailurus in 2003 and in 2023, the Machairodontine species Dinofelis werdelini was named in honour of him. The genus name of Werdelinus, an extinct hyaenid described in 2010, was also dedicated to him and his contributions to carnivore paleontology.

Below is a list of taxa that Werdelin has contributed to naming:

Year	Taxon	Authors
2025	Ictonyx harrisoni sp. nov.	Werdelin & Fourvel
2025	Taotienimravus songi gen. et sp. nov.	Jiangzuo, Lyras, Grohe, Werdelin, Niu, Huang, Li, Jiang, Fu, Wan, Liu, Wang, & Deng
2024	Prionailurus kurteni sp. nov.	Jiangzuo, Werdelin, Zhang, Tong, Yan, Chen, Ma, Liu, & Wu
2023	Amphimachairodus hezhengensis sp. nov.	Jiangzuo, Werdelin, Sanisidro, Yang, Fu, Li, Wang, & Deng
2022	Taowu liui gen. et sp. nov.	Jiangzuo, Werdelin, & Sun
2021	Ekweeconfractus amorui gen. et sp. nov.	Flink, Cote, Rossie, Kibii, & Werdelin
2018	Katifelis nightingalei gen. et sp. nov.	Adrian, Werdelin, & Grossman
2018	Kichechia savagei sp. nov.	Adrian, Werdelin, & Grossman
2015	Eucyon kuta sp. nov.	Werdelin, Lewis, & Haile-Selassie
2012	Asilifelis coteae gen. et sp. nov.	Werdelin
2010	Lycaon sekowei sp. nov.	Hartstone-Rose, Werdelin, De Ruiter, Berger, & Churchill
2008	Crocuta eturono sp. nov.	Werdelin & Lewis
