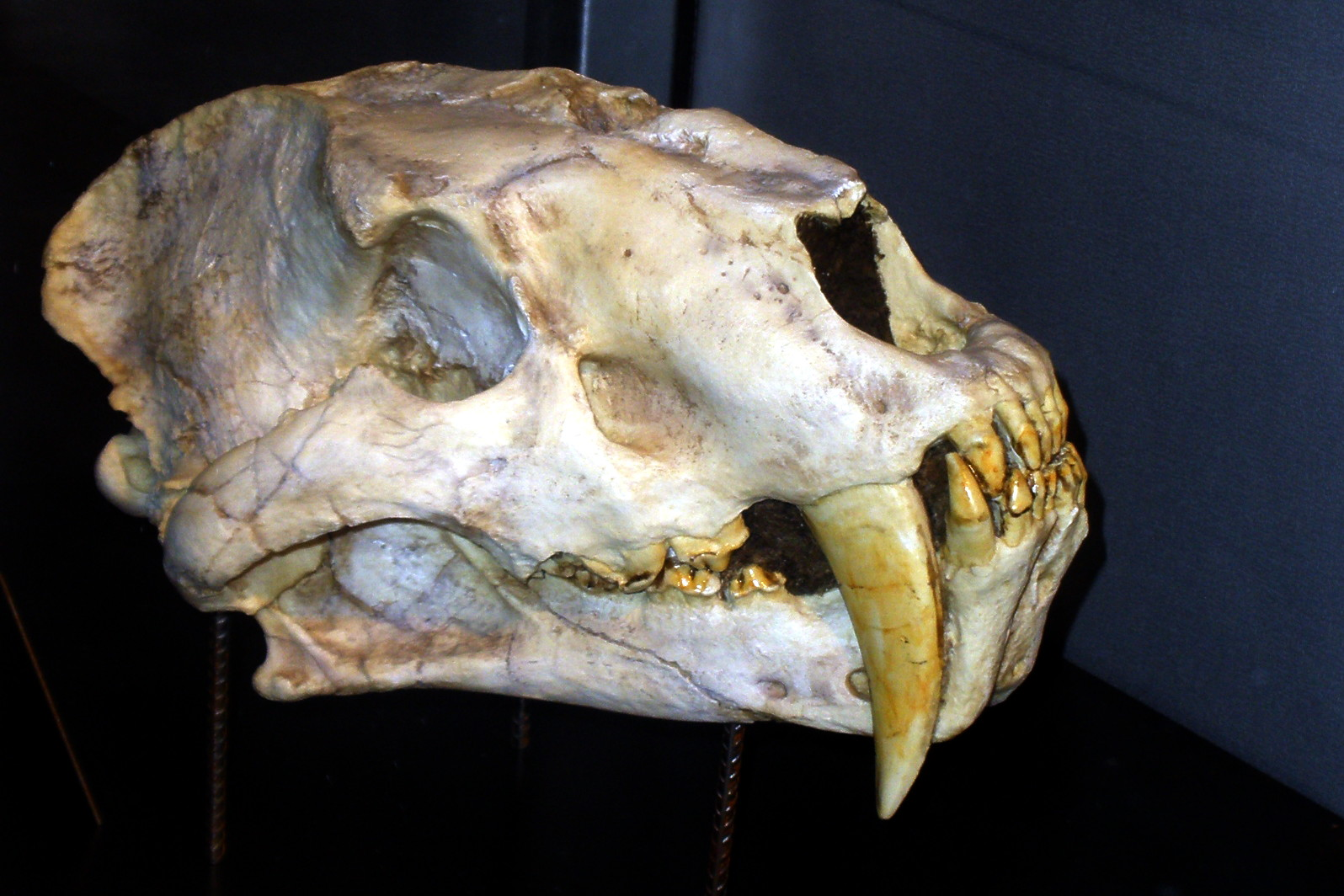
- A. giganteus skull

Scientific classification
- Kingdom: Animalia
- Phylum: Chordata
- Class: Mammalia
- Order: Carnivora
- Family: Felidae
- Subfamily: †Machairodontinae
- Tribe: †Homotherini
- Genus: †Amphimachairodus; Kretzoi, 1929

Type species
- †Amphimachairodus palanderi (Zdansky 1924) sensu Kretzoi, 1929

Other Species
- A. alvarezi Ruiz-Ramoni et al., 2019; A. coloradensis (Cook, 1922); A. giganteus (Wagner, 1848); A. hezhengensis Jiangzuo et al., 2023; A. horribilis (Schlosser, 1903); A. kabir? (Peigne et al., 2005); A. kurteni? (Sotnikova, 1992)

Synonyms
- Synonyms of A. coloradensis: Machairodus coloradensis Cook, 1922; Synonyms of A. giganteus: Machairodus giganteus; Synonyms of A. horribilis: Machairodus horribilis Schlosser, 1903; Machairodus tingii Zdansky, 1934; Amphimachairodus tingii (Zdansky, 1934); Machairodus irtychensis Orlov, 1936; Amphimachairodus irtychensis (Orlov, 1936); Synonyms of A. palanderi: Machairodus palanderi; Machairodus kurteni? Sotnikova, 1992; Amphimachairodus kurteni?; Synonyms of A. kabir: Machairodus kabir Peigne et al., 2005; Adeilosmilus kabir

= Amphimachairodus =

Amphimachairodus Temporal range: Late Miocene to Early Pliocene (Tortonian to Zanclean), 9.8–4.4 Ma

Extinct genus of sabertooth cat

Amphimachairodus (from Ancient Greek ἀμφί (amphí), meaning "both", μάχαιρα (mákhaira), a type of ancient sword, and ὀδούς (odoús), meaning "tooth") is an extinct genus of homotherin machairodontine felids. It inhabited Eurasia, North America, and possibly Africa during the Late Miocene to Early Pliocene epoch. It was probably descended from Machairodus, and in turn ancestral to later homotheriins like Homotherium.

== History and taxonomy ==
The genus Amphimachairodus was first proposed by Miklos Kretzoi for the species Machairodus palanderi.

Machairodus horribilis was first described in 1903 by Schlosser, who failed to correctly designate a holotype specimen, and thus the species was largely ignored until a 2008 paper redescribed the species and properly designated a lectotype for it. It was subsequently suggested to be reassigned to Amphimachairodus by Ruiz-Ramoni et al. (2019).

Amphimachairodus pliocaenicus was described in 1988 by Joan Pons-Moyà based on fossils from the early Pliocene, found on the Iberian Peninsula. But Ruiz-Ramoni et al. in 2019 considered the fossils too scarce to confirm its assignment to the genus.

Machairodus kurteni was described in 1992. The same paper also resurrected the previously synonymized Pogonodon copei as Machairodus copei, and reassigned the subspecies Machairodus aphanistus taracliensis as Machairodus giganteus taracliensis.

Machairodus kabir was described in 2005, and reassigned to Amphimachairodus in 2007. The describing paper also considered the species Machairodus tingii, Machairodus leoninus, Machairodus taracliensis, and Machairodus palanderi synonyms or subspecies of "Machairodus" giganteus. In 2022, this species was proposed to be reassigned to a separate genus, called Adeilosmilus.

Amphimachairodus alvarezi was described by Ruiz-Ramoni et al. in 2019.

In 2023, a review of the genus considered species Amphimachairodus irtychensis a junior synonym of A. horribilis, and A. kurteni a synonym of A. palanderi.

The species Amphimachairodus hezhengensis was described in 2023.

In 2025, a description of A. horribilis material from Mongolia included a broader discussion of Amphimachairodus species and taxonomy, and argued for the validity of the species A. irtychensis as a more primitive species than A. horribilis.

Amphimachairodus has been suggested to be a paraphyletic evolutionary grade that evolved from species of the genus Machairodus, and is in turn ancestral to later homotherines like Homotherium.

=== Evolution ===
Amphimachairodus was thought to have evolved from Machairodus, with the earliest species, A. hezhengensis, being known from the Dashengou Fauna around 9.8 Ma. In Europe, Machairodus would later be replaced by A. giganteusduring the early Turolian. Amphimachairodus dispersed into in North America during the Hemphillian stage, with the earliest remains being found in Withlacoochee River 4A of Florida. While Amphimachairodus was initially rare compared to Nimravides, it would've later replaced it as the latter went extinct due to a faunal turnover during the Hemphillian. Unlike the Eurasian lineage, which saw an increase in size, North American Amphimachairodus saw a decrease in size. The African species of Amphimachairodus was thought to have been the ancestor of Homotherium.

== Description ==
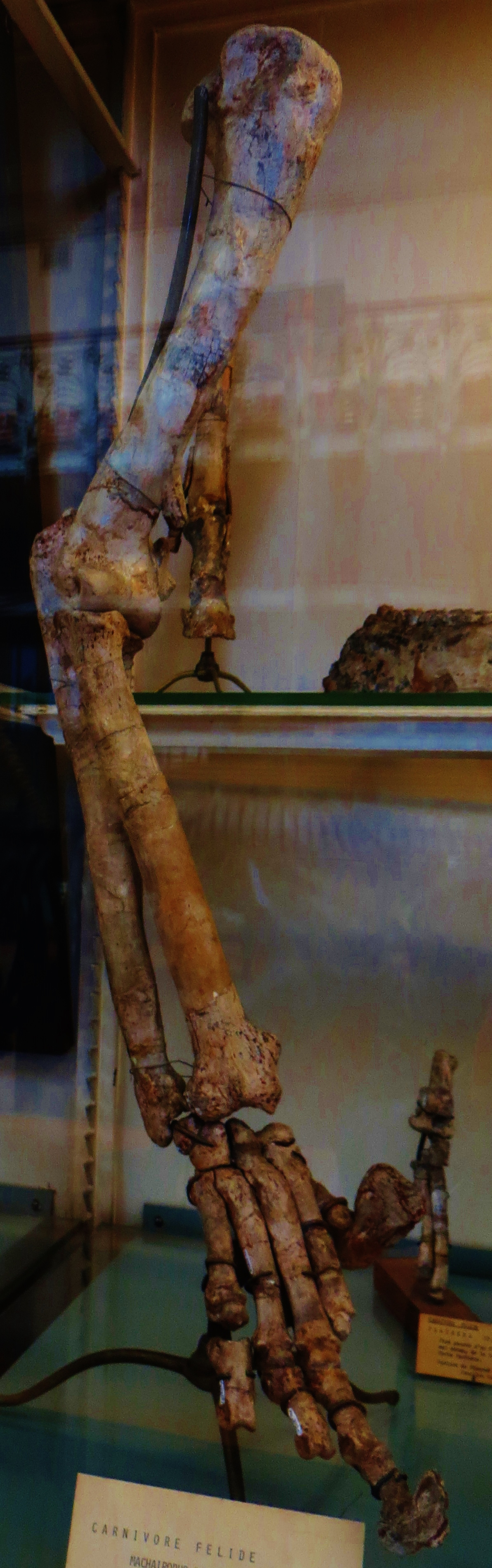
Front limb

All Amphimachairodus species have a developed mandibular flange, however, A. colaradensis is distinguishable from A. giganteus and A. kurteni by subtle differences in the shape of the mandible and placement of lower carnassials.

In size and proportions, the Eurasian species A. giganteus was remarkably similar to a modern lion or tiger and had a shoulder height of 1.1 m (3.6 ft). This species has a skull length of around 14 in (36 cm). There was marked sexual dimorphism in A. giganteus, with males being much larger than females. The African species A. kabir is suggested to have weighed 350–490 kg (770–1,080 lb). This would make it comparable in size to Xenosmilus and Smilodon populator.

A. horribilis of China is one of largest known species in the genus, weighing around 405 kg (893 pounds). This is comparable in size to the much later S. populator. Its skull, measuring upwards of 16 inches (41 cm) in length, is one of the largest known skulls for any machairodont, with only a recently described S. populator skull rivaling it in size, with the latter cat outweighing A. horribilis at 960 lb (440 kg). A. coloradensis is smaller than the mentioned species, it stood around 1.2 m (3.9 ft) at the shoulder, and could have weighed around 115 kg (254 lb). A 2021 study suggested it was larger, weighing 116–171 kg (256–377 lb), with an average weight of 144 kg (317 lb), based on the articular width of the humerus. This species had a skull length of 12.5 inches (32 centimetres).

Amphimachairodus was about 2 metres (6.6 feet) long and probably hunted as an ambush predator. Its legs were too short to sustain a long chase, but it most likely was a good jumper. It probably used its canines to cut open the throat of its prey, severing the major arteries and possibly crushing the windpipe. Its teeth were rooted to its mouth and were not as delicate as those of most other saber-toothed cats of the time, which had extremely long canines that hung out of their mouths. The fangs of Amphimachairodus, however, were able to easily fit in its mouth comfortably while being long enough to be effective for hunting. Like Homotherium, Amphimachairodus canines would've been concealed in life.

=== Skull ===
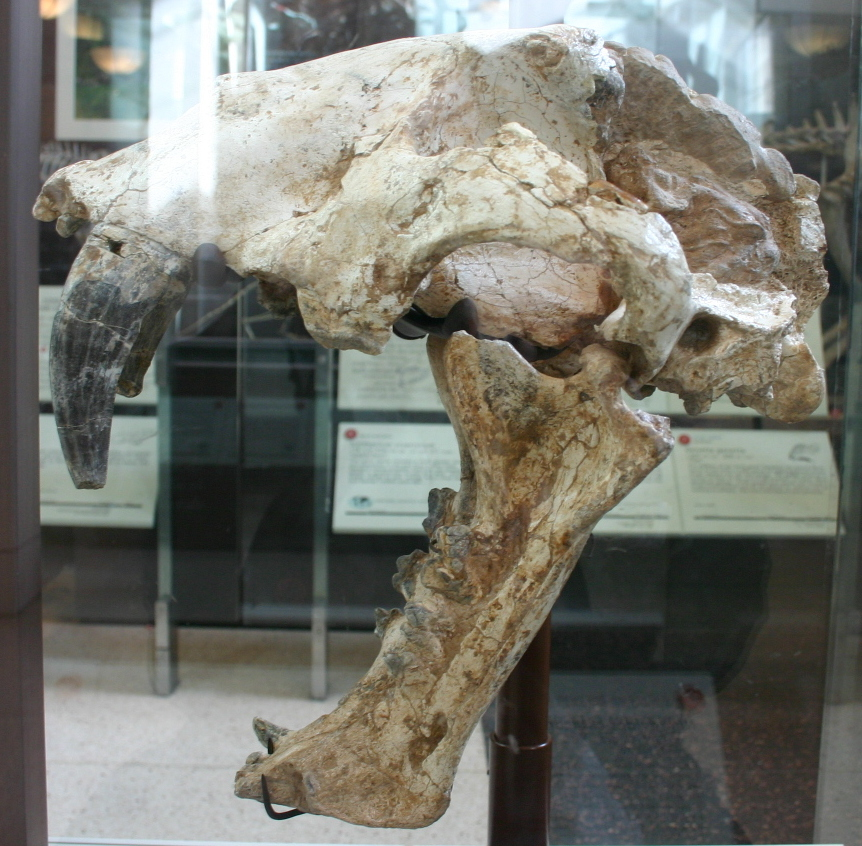
An A. giganteus skull with chipped left canine and more severely damaged right canine. This chipping is not severe enough to be called a true break, which would be in excess of half of the canine

This specimen was from a large male A. giganteus with the skull measuring 14 in (36 cm) from the Late Miocene in China, comparable to a male lion or tiger. Deformation of the skull through natural fossilization processes has changed the shape slightly, making it asymmetrical, but overall it remains an excellent specimen for studying the cranial morphology of this particular genus and species.

For felines, this skull is rather long, but rivaled by the skulls of the two largest species of extant cats: the lion and tiger. When compared with the skull of a regular lion, it is long and very narrow, particularly in the muzzle and width of the zygomatic arches. Its sagittal crest is well pronounced. Compared with other machairodonts, the canines are stout and capable of large amounts of stress. This characteristic is slightly remodeled in females, whose canines are slimmer and generally longer. Compared with females, the orbit of males are smaller, muzzles larger, the anterior-most portion of the nasal bones generally flare upwards slightly, and the downward slope of the dorsal edge of the skull in front of the orbit is not as pronounced, producing a straighter profile. Compared with the most well known machairodont Smilodon, commonly referred to as the "saber-toothed cat", the canines are much shorter, the facial portion again is much longer, and the teeth not reduced so far in number. Several machairodonts, namely Megantereon, bear flanges on the mandible, which are very reduced in A. giganteus though characteristics of the mandible associated with the flanges are present, particularly the lateral flattening of the anterior portion of the mandible, creating a cross section more square than semi-circular. The dental formula for this specimen is 3.1.2.13.1.2.1.

== Paleobiology ==
=== Predatory behavior ===
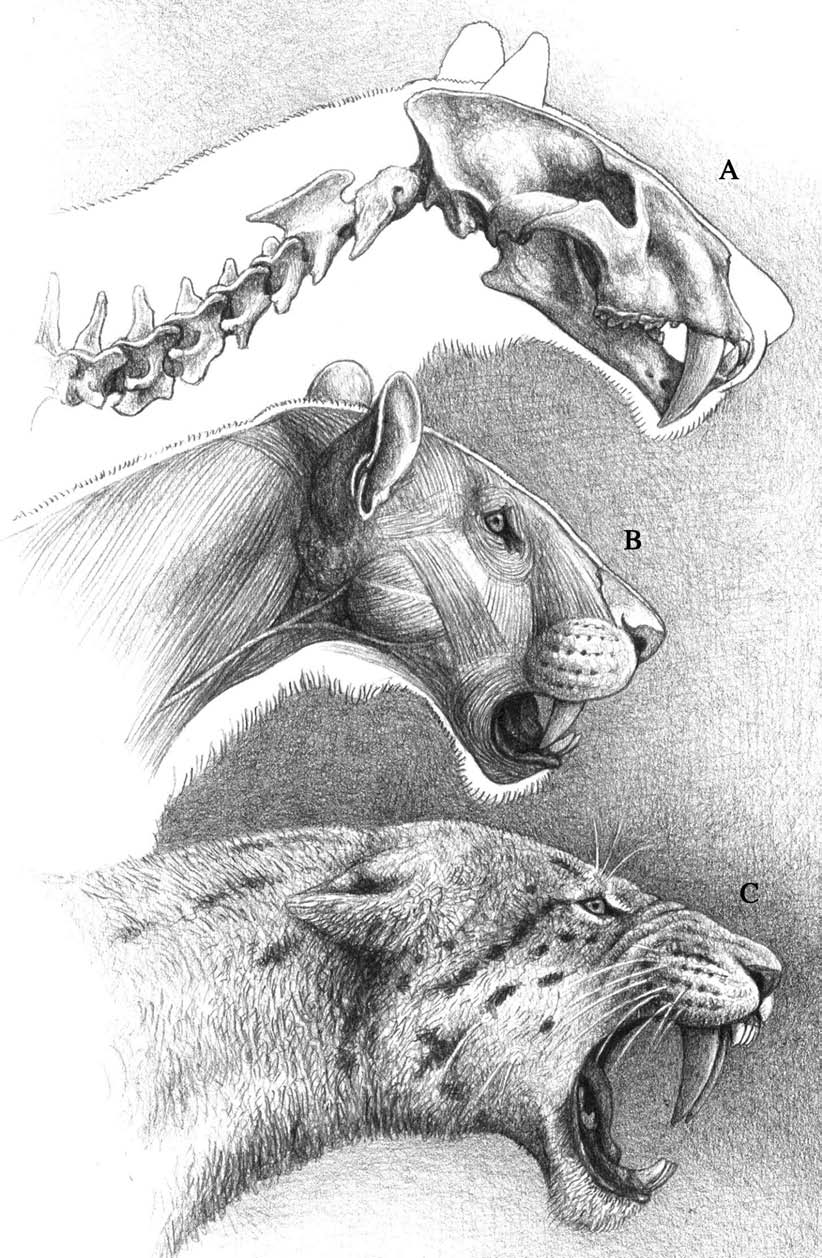
Reconstructed musculature and life appearance of A. giganteus by Mauricio Antón

Amphimachairodus' forehead were wider than their rostrum, which may have been an adaption to live in open environments. Despite its great size, A. horribilis was better equipped to hunt relatively smaller prey than Smilodon, as evidenced by its moderate jaw gape of 70°, similar to the gape of a modern lion. Analysis on A. giganteus and other sabertooth predators' jaw anatomy suggests that sabertooth jaws found that increased jaw gape and canine length enabled a deeper bite on prey on smaller and medium-sized prey, however this wasn't seen with larger prey. This suggest the adaption of sabertooth predators was suited for fast and effective killing of normal sized prey. This is further supported in a 2020 paper, where the effective jaw gape was restricted between 45° and 65°, furthermore proving not all sabertooths were large prey specialists. The authors estimated A. giganteus and A. coloradensis had jaw gaps of 62.25° and 68.11° respectively. ^{Including supplementary materials} According to Christiansen 2007, a 224.8 kg (496 lb) A. giganteus has a bite force of 1,045.4 N or 235.0 lbf at the canines. Mesowear analysis found that A. coloradensis had a low degree of moderate & heavy tooth wear, suggesting it primarily fed on soft tissues.

=== Social behavior ===
Experts believed A. hezhengensis may have been gregarious due to its adaptation of living in open environments such as stereo vision, which would've aided in prey identification and cooperative hunting. Additionally, evidence of healed pathological forepaw suggests evidence of partner care, and the abundant of large carnivorans present in Linxia Basin, which likely prove the rapid morphological evolution and gregariousness.

However, it is unknown if other members of the genus were gregarious or solitary.

== Paleoecology ==
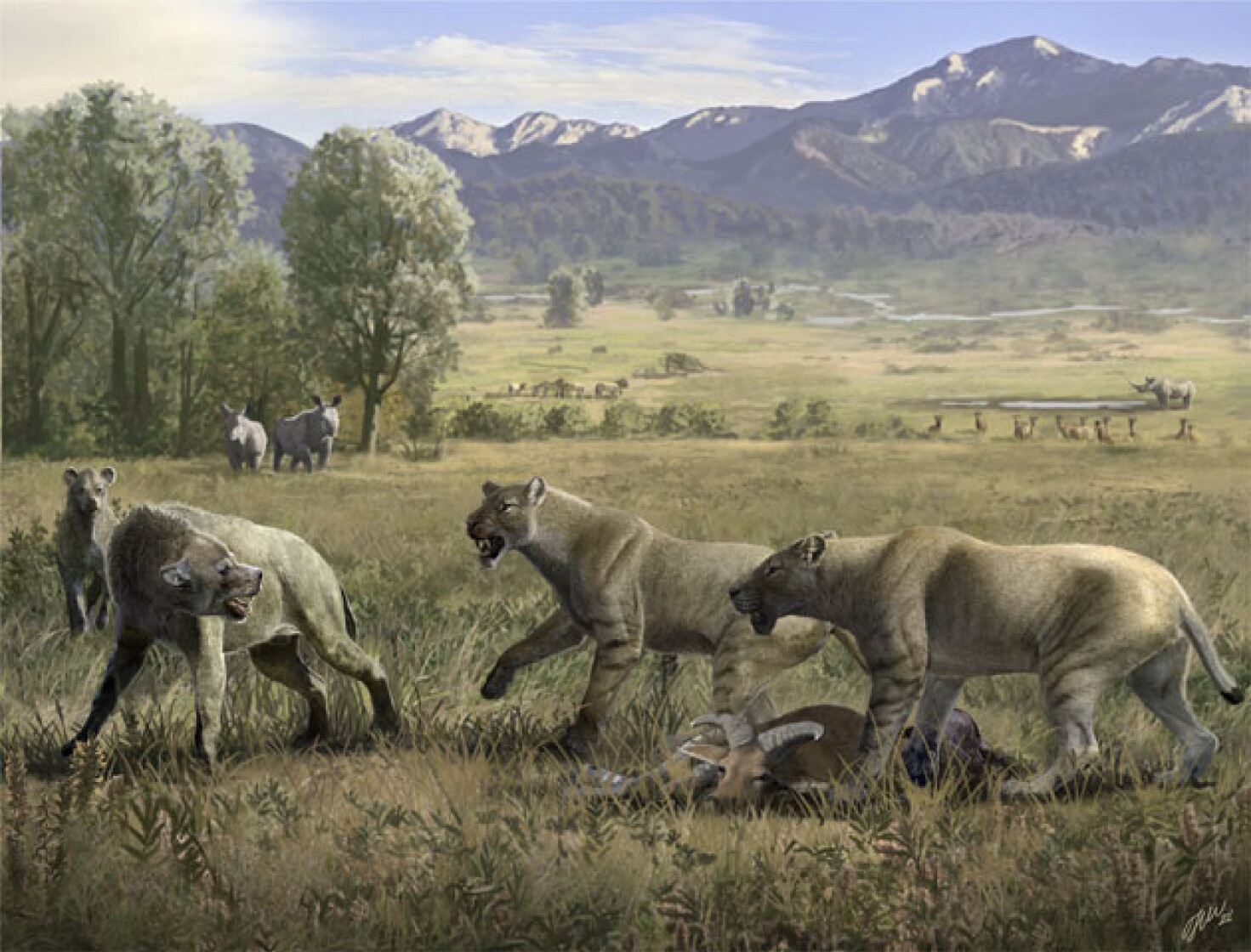
Life restoration of Amphimachairodus hezhengensis confronting Dinocrocuta

Amphimachairodus hezhengensis lived in an open arid environment in Linxia Basin, caused by the uplifting of Tibetan Plateau. Within the Dashengou Fauna, it would have coexisted with a number of other large carnivores including two species of medium-sized agriotheriini bears, the barbourofeline nimravid Albanosmilus, fellow machairodont Machairodus, and the huge hyena Dinocrocuta. Dinocrocuta was by far the most abundant carnivoran in the Dashengou Fauna, and would've practice kleptoparasitism on Amphimachairodus. Other carnivorans known from the area include skunks, mustelids, and four species of small to medium-sized hyenas. The herbivores present in this fauna include rhinoceros such as Acerorhinus hezhengensis, Chilotherium wimani, and Iranotherium morgani, suid Chleuastochoerus stehlini, cervid Dicrocerus, bovid Miotragocerus, giraffids Honanotherium schlosseri and Samotherium, and "tetralophodont gomphothere" Tetralophodon exoletus.

A. giganteus was an inhabitant of woodlands and open floodplains as based on finds in Pikermi in Greece and Shanxi Province in China, indicating it had habitat preferences similar to modern lions in many respects. Specimens recovered from Turolian deposits indicate that the fauna living there was much the same, differing only by species in many cases. Among the animals it shared its environment with were bovids such as Parabos, Lutung monkeys, the proboscidean Anancus, the rhino Aceratherium, antelopes such as Tragoportax and Miotragocerus as well as gazelles and deer, a very large species of hyrax, early goats, various giraffes, camels such as Paracamelus, the horse Hipparion, a species of aardvark, the chalicothere Ancylotherium and the beaver-like Dipoides. Other carnivores it shared its territory with include the percrocutid hyena Dinocrocuta, the agriotheriini bear Agriotherium, fellow machairodonts Metailurus and Paramachairodus and hyenas like Thalassictis. The larger herbivores were likely common prey for Amphimachairodus, and it likely would have competed with Agriotherium for food, possibly yielding kills to the bear and possibly also stealing kills from hyenas such as Thalassictis and from Metailurus when the opportunity arose.

A. horribilis lived in a multitude of paleoenvironments such as open woodland and open grassland. It shared its environment with forested mammals such as primates, chalicotheres, and the deer Eostyloceros. While in open grassland, it coexisted with the dwarf horse Sivalhippus platyodus and giraffids such as Honanotherium and Samotherium, although the latter was rare and low in taxonomy diversity. This species of Amphimachairodous was probably a hunter of these horses due to their less cursorial postcranial skeleton, with giraffids being less ideal prey due to their height. It would have also lived alongside the large pig Kubanochoerus. Within the Yangjishan Fauna, A. horribilis coexisted with a large number of carnivorans including agriotheriini Agriotherium and ursavini Ursavus tedfordi, ailuridae Simocyon, at least seven species of hyenas (Including Adcrocuta), and mustelids such as large gulonine Plesiogulo crassa, meline Parataxidea, and Martes. Within this fauna, felids were more abundant compared to Dashengou Fauna making up 28.6% of carnivorans present. A. horribilis was an abundant and dominant large carnivore in the fauna. Other than A. horribilis, contemporary felids included Pontosmilus, Paramacherodus, Metailurus, Yoshi minor, and Pristifelis. The lack of civet-like and mongoose-like insectivore/omnivore suggests the environment was probably open.

In North America, in places such as Coffee Ranch in Texas, A. coloradensis shared territory with Huracan, but also shared territory with felids such as Nimravides and Lynx, canids such as Vulpes, Epicyon and Borophagus, and herbivores like the camels Aepycamelus and Hemiauchenia the pronghorn antelope Cosoryx, horses like Dinohippus, Neohipparion and Nannippus, the peccary Prosthennops and rhinoceroses like Teleoceras and Aphelops. At the Optima fossil site in Oklahoma, A. coloradensis coexisted with carnivorans such with the ursid Huracan, canids like Borophagus, Eucyon, and Vulpes. Herbivores it coexisted with was the ground sloth Megalonyx, horses such as Astrohippus, Dinohippus, Nannihippus, and Neohipparion, rhinoceroses like Teleoceras and Aphelops, peccary Platygonus, camels such as Hemiauchenia and Megatylopus, and the mammutid Mastodon. Isotopic analysis suggests a high degree of niche partitioning within the carnivore guild with A. coloradensis having a preference for horses (61.4%) as opposed to camels, mastodons, pronghorns & rhinos (38.7%).

In the Djurab desert in northern Chad, A. kabir co-existed with fellow machairodonts Lokotunjailurus, Tchadailurus and early representatives of the genera Dinofelis and Megantereon. In addition, animals such as crocodiles, three-toed horses, fish, monkeys, hippos, aardvarks, turtles, rodents, giraffes, snakes, antelopes, pigs, mongooses, foxes, hyenas, otters, honey badgers and the hominid Sahelanthropus dwelled here, providing ample food. Based on these and other fossils, it is theorized that the Djurab was once the shore of a lake, generally forested close to the shore with savannah-like areas some distance away. The great number of cat species in the environment indicates that there was significant prey and available niches for multiple species of large felids to coexist. Due to its large size, A. kabir probably predated upon anthracotheriids such as Libycosaurus and subadult individuals of hippopotamids and proboscideans. A. kabir was also found in Langebaanweg of South Africa suggesting a pan-African distribution for the species. Within Langebaanweg, it would've coexisted with machairodonts like as Dinofelis, Yoshi, and Lokotunjailurus, mustelids like Sivaonyx and Plesiogulo, the bear Agriotherium, the hyena Hyaenictis, and the canid Eucyon.
