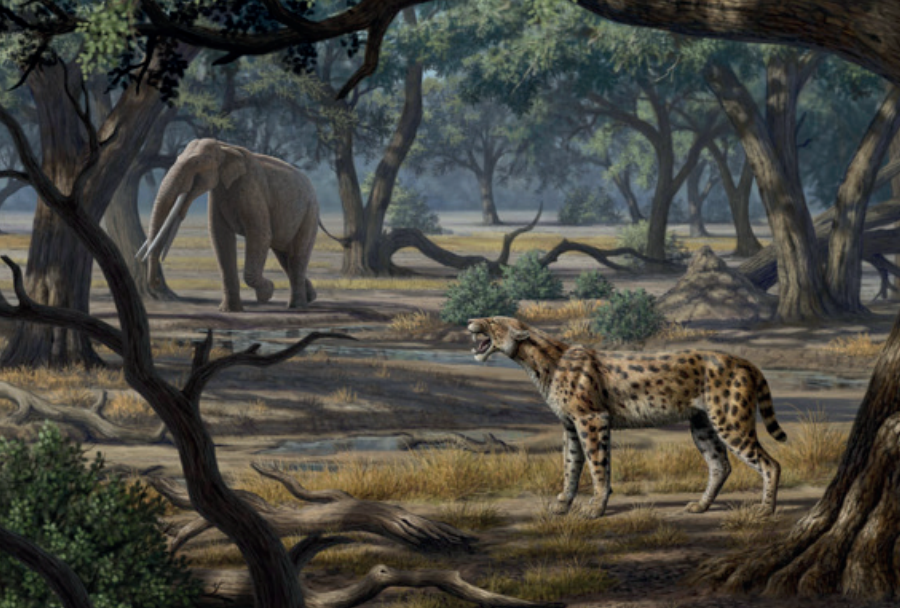
- Restoration of L. emageritus by Mauricio Antón

Scientific classification
- Kingdom: Animalia
- Phylum: Chordata
- Class: Mammalia
- Order: Carnivora
- Family: Felidae
- Subfamily: †Machairodontinae
- Tribe: †Homotherini
- Genus: †Lokotunjailurus; Werdelin 2003

Type species
- Lokotunjailurus emageritus Werdelin, 2003

Other species
- †Lokotunjailurus chinsamyae Jiangzuo et al., 2023; †Lokotunjailurus fanonei Bonis, Peigné, Mackaye, Likius, Vignaud & Brunet, 2010

Synonyms
- Lokotunjailuurs Bonis, Peigné, Mackaye, Likius, Vignaud & Brunet 2010

= Lokotunjailurus =

Lokotunjailurus Temporal range: 7-5 Ma

Extinct genus of carnivores

Lokotunjailurus is an extinct genus of saber-toothed cats (Machairodontinae) which existed during the late Miocene and earliest Pliocene epoch and is known from localities in northern, central, eastern and southern Africa, and possibly late Miocene of Sivalik Hills of Indian subcontinent. As a big cat, it was more slender than comparable recent species and its build suggests cursoriality. It is grouped among a group of similar-looking saber-toothed cats known as the scimitar-tooths.

== History and taxonomy ==
The type species L. emageritus was documented by Lars Werdelin based on fossils found at the Lothagam site in Kenya. He described it as a large felid with an extremely long claw on one digit. He named the genus from the Turkana word for "cat" and the species from the word for "claw". Werdelin considered L. emageritus to be similar to Homotherium in dentition and to represent a basal member of Homotherini. More recent studies have since shed more light on its evolution, where Lokotunjailurus is shown to be sister to a lineage consisting of Amphimachairodus and its descendants, including Homotherium, and therefore no immediate relative of the latter.

A second species L. fanonei was described from fossils found in the Toros Menalla Formation in the Djurab Desert of Chad. The deposits date to the Late Miocene (7 mya). A third species L. chinsamyae was named in 2023, based on material from Langebaanweg, South Africa. The species name honours Anusuya Chinsamy-Turan, a South African paleontologist. In 2025, J. C. Barry considered some specimens from Siwaliks of Potwar Plateau, and Megantereon praecox material from Siwaliks of Haritalyangar, Himachal Pradesh to be similar to Lokotunjailurus emageritus, though he considered that they're slightly smaller in size and classified them as cf. Lokotunjailurus sp., pending further study.

== Description ==
Lokotunjailurus was about as tall as a lioness; about 90 cm (3.0 ft) at the shoulder, but was much lighter in build due to its longer legs and more gracile body. Its dewclaws were particularly large in proportion to its body and were bigger than those of a much larger lion, indicating it relied on them quite heavily for grappling with prey. In comparison, its claws on the second to fourth digits were smaller than those of leopards.

== Paleoecology ==
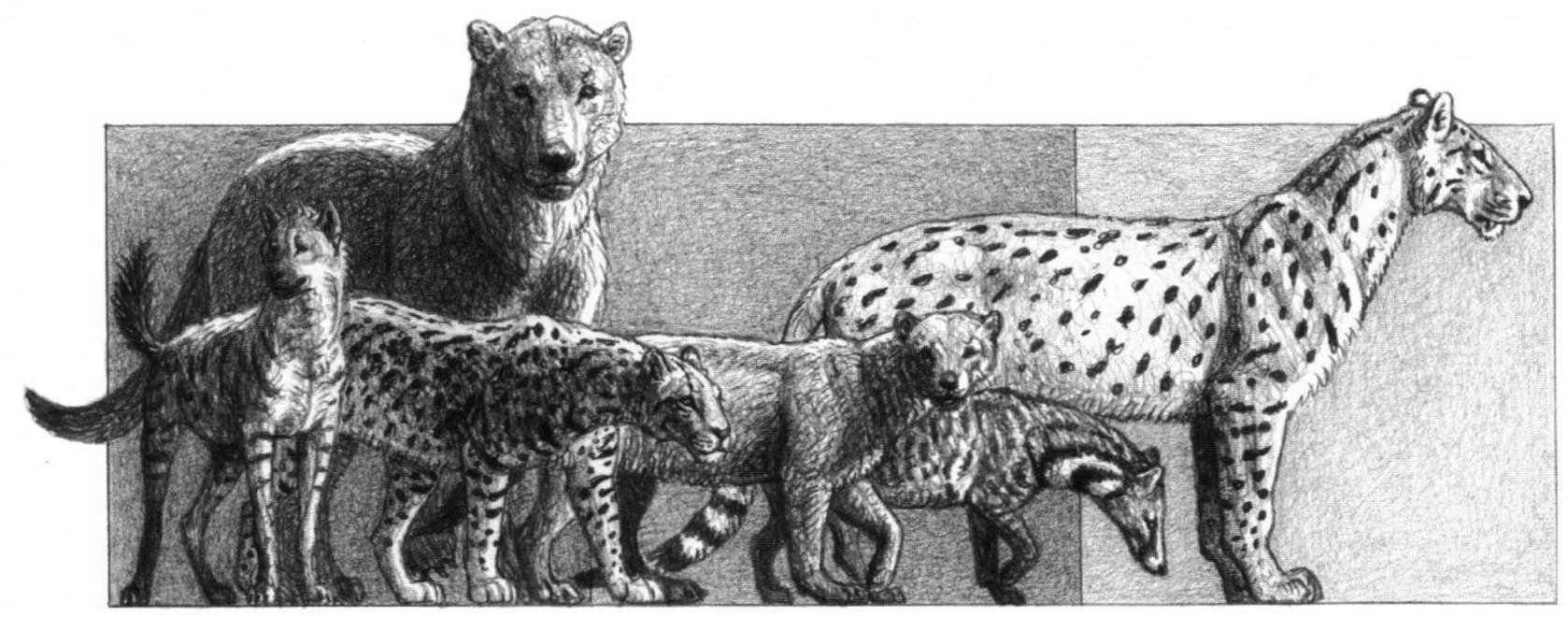
Paleoart of Lokotunjailurus (far right) and other Late Miocene African carnivorans

In the Djurab desert in northern Chad in central Africa, Lokotunjailurus fanonei seems to have lived alongside fellow machairodonts Adeilosmilus kabir, Yoshi and early representatives of the genus Megantereon. In addition to these other cats, animals such as crocodiles, primitive three-toed horses, fish, monkeys, hippos, aardvarks, turtles, rodents, giraffes, snakes, antelopes, pigs, mongooses, foxes, hyenas, otters, honey badgers, the elephantid Stegotetrabelodon and the hominid Sahelanthropus tchadensis providing ample food for these cats, indicating that there was enough biodiversity that four sabertooths could coexist. At Langebaanweg, the carnivore guild was generally similar, but included a Dinofelis species (D. werdelini) in addition to the machairodont genera mentioned above, although Megantereon does not appear to be present.
