= Longchuansmilus =

Longchuansmilus Temporal range: Late Miocene

Scientific classification
- Kingdom: Animalia
- Phylum: Chordata
- Class: Mammalia
- Order: Carnivora
- Family: Felidae
- Subfamily: †Machairodontinae
- Tribe: †Machairodontini
- Genus: †Longchuansmilus; Jiangzuo et al., 2022

Type species
- †Longchuansmilus xingyongi Jiangzuo et al., 2022

Extinct genus of carnivores

Longchuansmilus is an extinct genus of machairodontine (sabre-toothed) cat that lived in China during the Late Miocene. The type and only species, Longchuansmilus xingyongi, was described in 2022.

== Etymology ==
The generic name "Longchuansmilus" refers to the Longchuan River, which runs along the Yuanmou Basin, and the Greek σμίλη/smilē meaning "dagger". The specific name honours Xingyong Zhang, who has helped greatly in the discovery and study of the fossils at the Yuanmou hominid site.

== Palaeoecology ==
Longchuansmilus is thought to have been jaguar-sized.

Longchuansmilus would have coexisted with proboscideans, the beaver Sinocastor, the rodent Kowalskia, the flying squirrel Pliopetaurista, the rabbit Alilepus, and the ape Lufengpithecus. Animals found near the fossil include tapirs, insectivores, flying squirrels, bamboo rats, freshwater birds, fish, frogs, turtles, crocodiles, beavers, otters and terrestrial birds, all which point to a swampy or lacustrine environment.
