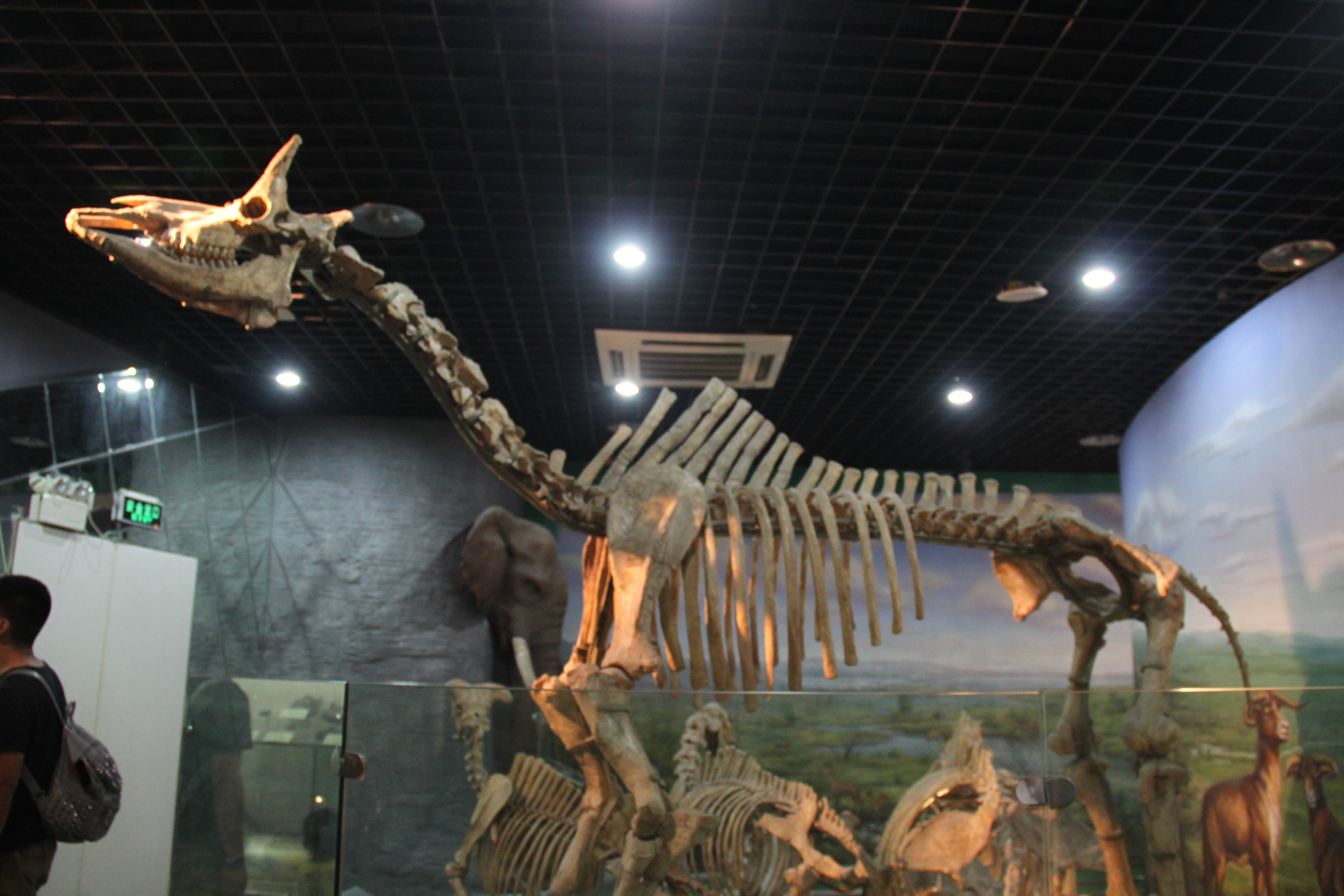
- Mounted skeleton in Henan Geological Museum

Scientific classification
- Kingdom: Animalia
- Phylum: Chordata
- Class: Mammalia
- Order: Artiodactyla
- Family: Giraffidae
- Genus: †Honanotherium; Bohlin, 1927

Species
- H. schlosseri Bohlin, 1927; H. bernori Solounias & Danowitz, 2016

= Honanotherium =

Honanotherium Temporal range: Late Miocene

Extinct genus of mammals

Honanotherium is a genus of extinct giraffid from the late Miocene of Henan Province, China, and East Azerbaijan Province, northwestern Iran. It was closely related to Bohlinia and was once thought to be ancestral to the modern giraffe (genus Giraffa). The living animal would have resembled a modern giraffe, but was somewhat shorter, with more massive ossicones.

The first part of the generic name, honano refers to the Henan (Chinese: 河南; pinyin: Hénán) province of China, where the first specimens were recovered. The second part, therium, comes from the Greek, θηρίον which means "beast."

== Paleobiology ==
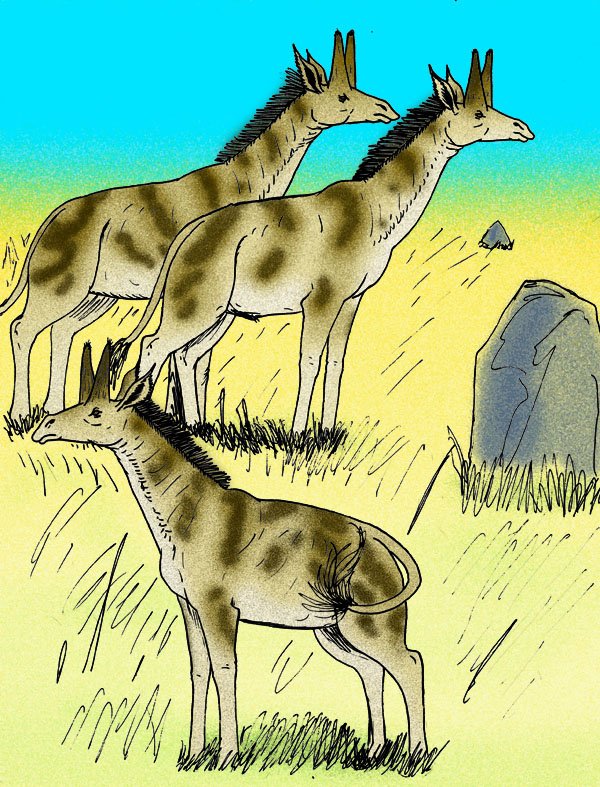
Life restoration of H. schlossheri

Like the modern-day giraffe, Honanotherium may have grazed on low-lying trees in the savannah environment, although its shorter neck shows that it probably fed on different plants than the extant giraffe.
