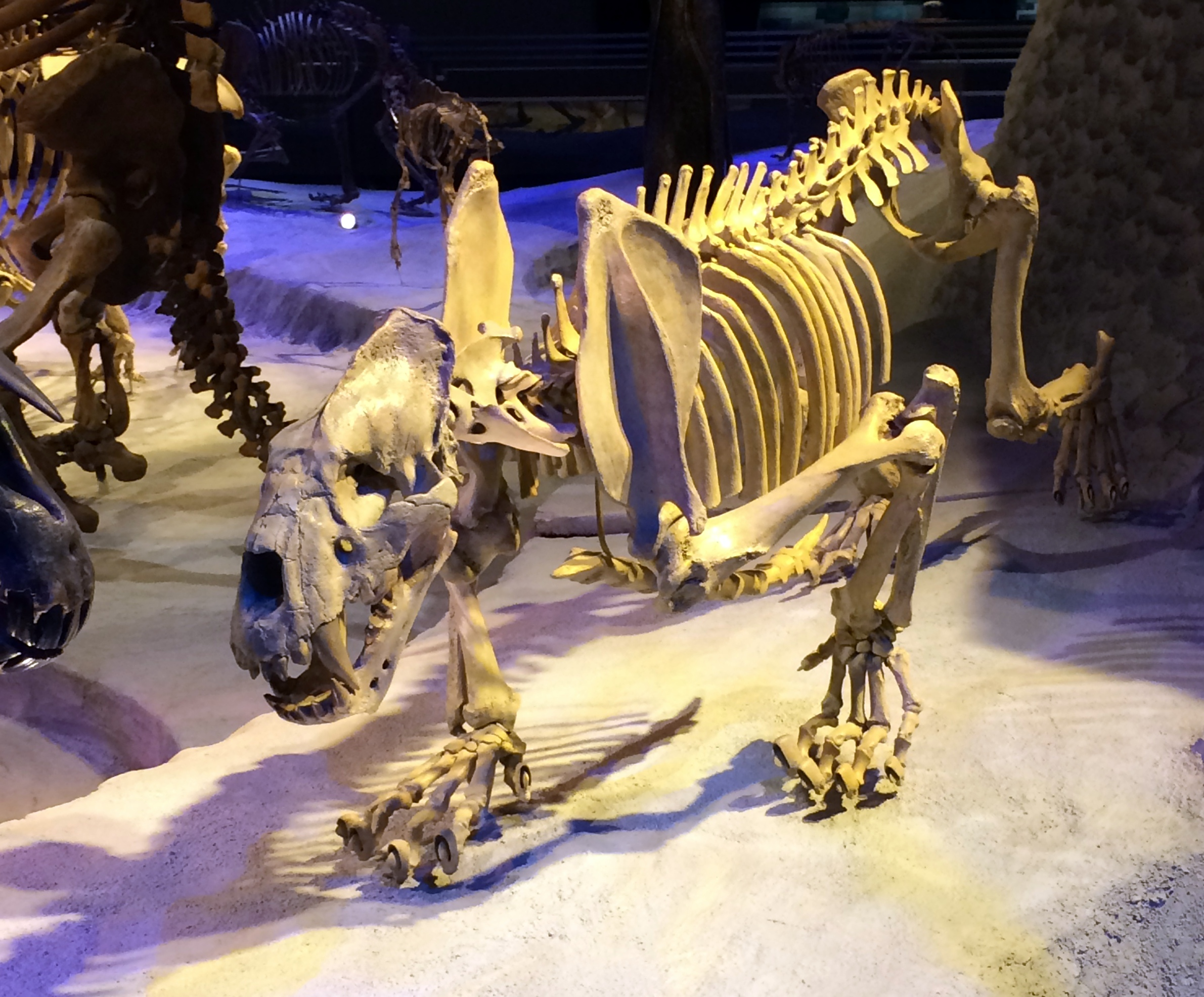
- X. hodsonae, Florida Museum of Natural History Fossil Hall at the University of Florida

Scientific classification
- Kingdom: Animalia
- Phylum: Chordata
- Class: Mammalia
- Order: Carnivora
- Family: Felidae
- Subfamily: †Machairodontinae
- Tribe: †Homotherini
- Genus: †Xenosmilus; Martin et al., 2000

Type species
- †Xenosmilus hodsonae Martin et al., 2000

Other species
- †X.? venezuelensis Rincón et al., 2011

= Xenosmilus =

Xenosmilus Temporal range: Early Pleistocene (Blancan to Irvingtonian) ~2–1 Ma Possible Middle Pleistocene records

Extinct genus of sabertooth cat

Xenosmilus (from Ancient Greek ξένος (xénos), meaning "strange", and σμίλη (smílē), meaning "knife, chisel") is an extinct genus of homotherin machairodontine felid (saber-toothed cat) that roamed North America from the Early Pleistocene. The type species of the genus, X. hodsonae, is known from Early Pleistocene deposits in Florida.

Over the recent years, scientists have proposed X. venezuelensis (formerly Homotherium venezuelensis) could be a valid species within the genus, in addition to a possible third unnamed species, cf. Xenosmilus sp., from Uruguay. If valid, both species would extend the genus' range into the Middle Pleistocene and South America.

== Taxonomy ==
=== Discovery and naming ===
Two fairly intact specimens were found by amateur fossil hunters in 1983 (1981 by some sources) in the Haile limestone mines in Alachua County, Florida. The genus and type species, Xenosmilus hodsonae, was described in 2001 based on a nearly complete skeleton (BIOPSI 101) from the Florida site Haile 21A, with a second partial skeleton (UF 60,000) as the paratype. Both skeletons came from Early Pleistocene-aged rocks in Florida. A radius similar to X. hodsonae was found in Blancan rocks of Arizona, this represents the earliest record of the genus outside of Florida.

The genus name, Xenosmilus, was derived from the Greek ξένος/xenos meaning "strange", and σμίλη/smilē meaning "knife". The species name, hodsonae, honors Debra Hodson, the wife of a researcher.

=== Classification ===
Xenosmilus is in the tribe Homotherini in the subfamily Machairodontinae of the cat family. A paper published in 2022 proposed that Xenosmilus is a more derived member of the tribe Machairodontini (another name for Homotherini), and that Homotherium venezuelensis should be reassigned to Xenosmilus. The 2022 study found that Xenosmilus was nested within Homotherium as traditionally defined, making Homotherium without including the species in Xenosmilus paraphyletic. A 2024 paper argued that remains of a homotherin from Uruguay originally described in 2004, should also be assigned to the genus.

== Description ==
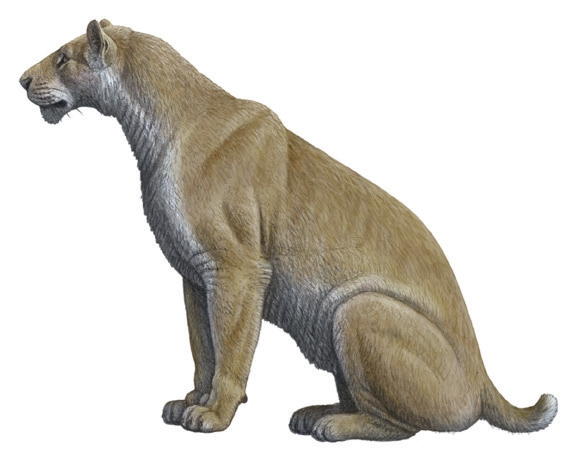
Life restoration by Mauricio Antón

The skull of Xenosmilus was 33 centimetres (13 in) in length. Compared to other machairodonts, Xenosmilus skull was relatively small, however, the occipital condyles was unusually large for the skull size. Overall, it had a more bearlike than catlike appearance.

Physically, the cat reached at least 1 m (3.3 ft) tall at the shoulder, and is estimated about the same size or larger than Smilodon fatalis. Its head and body length are comparable to a lion, which would place it at 1.8–2 metres (5.9–6.6 ft) in length. A 2019 book suggested a body mass range of 300–350 kilograms (660–770 lb). In 2024, Manzuetti and colleagues estimated cf. Xenosmilus sp. from Uruguay could have weighed 347–410 kilograms (765–904 lb). X. hodsonae has been estimated at 260-330 kilograms (570-730 lb) in weight, while the same study estimated X. venezuelensis at 190 kilograms (420 lb).

== Paleobiology ==
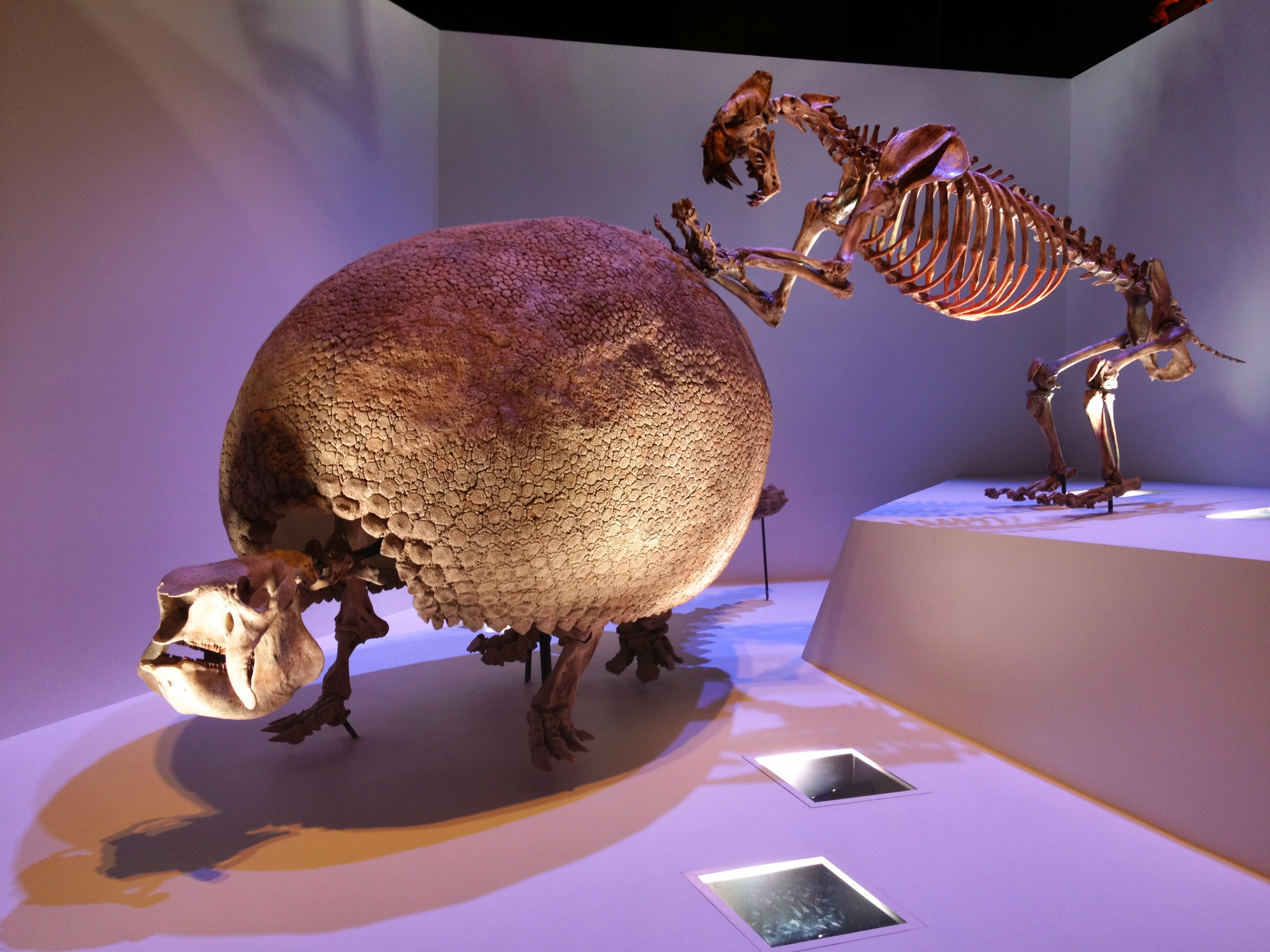
Mounted skeletons of Xenosmilus and Glyptodon, Houston Museum of Natural Science

Before the discovery of Xenosmilus, all known saber-toothed cats fell into two general categories. Dirk toothed cats had long upper canines and stout legs. Scimitar toothed cats had only mildly elongated canines, and long legs. Xenosmilus broke these groupings by possessing both stout muscular legs and body, and short broad upper canines. Unlike most other saber-toothed cats, all of Xenosmilus's teeth were serrated, not just its fangs and incisors. Xenosmilus differs from Homotherium and most other cats in the lack of a gap separating the last incisor tooth and the canine, as well as the loss of the p3 tooth. Notably, only the later species of Smilodon have also lost the p3 tooth. The way its top teeth were lined up also allowed Xenosmilus to concentrate its bite force on two teeth at a time.

Xenosmilus has also been theorized by some to have hunted via a "bite and retreat" strategy using its teeth to inflict deep wounds because of the way its canines and incisors could operate as a unit during a bite, leading to Xenosmilus bearing the occasional moniker of "cookie-cutter cat". It seems likely, with their muscular builds, that X. hodsonae preyed upon peccaries, due to the large numbers of peccaries found within the same site.

A study published in 2022 suggests that Xenosmilus and other machairodonts such as Smilodon were also capable of efficiently removing meat from a kill without damaging their teeth, as evidenced by bite marks on the bones of Platygonus. The same study also suggests that machairodonts could consume at least smaller bones when feeding, similar to lions.

Because the skeletons were found beside each other, some suspect Xenosmilus was a social mammal. According to Martin and colleagues, the cave deposit the specimens were found in may be evidence of denning behavior.

== Paleoenvironment ==
The holotype and paratype fossils of X. hodsonae were of Irvingtonian age (1.8 to 0.3 Ma). However, it has also been found in quarries dating to the late Blancan such as Inglis 1a and Haile 7g, dating it up to at least 2 million years ago. Inglis 1a was previously thought to have been a longleaf pine flatwoods and pine-oak scrub are known to have occupied the area, similar to the modern flora. However, more recent interpretations suggest that the environment of Pliocene-Pleistocene Florida was a mosaic of different communities (i.e. a mixture of forests, savannas, wetlands, etc.). Skull morphology and short limbs suggests Xenosmilus lived in forested environments. X. hodsonae coexisted with other herbivores such as ground sloths such as Megalonyx, Paramylodon, and Eremotherium eomigrans, the glyptodont Glyptotherium texanum, the camelid Hemiauchenia, the peccary Platygonus, and the proboscidean Mastodon. Contemporary carnivorans included felids such as lynx, Miracinonyx inexpectatus, and Smilodon gracilis, the canid Canis edwardii, and the ursid Arctodus pristinus. It also coexisted with the phorusrhacid, Titanis.

Potential species X. venezuelensis was found in El Breal de Orocual of the Mesa Formation in Venezuela, which may have been a similar environment to modern day Llanos. The rarity and scarcity of homotherins in South America may suggest that they lived in low population densities.
