= Larry Martin =

American paleontologist

Larry Dean Martin (December 8, 1943 – March 9, 2013) was an American vertebrate paleontologist and curator of the Natural History Museum and Biodiversity Research Center at the University of Kansas. Among Martin's work is research on the Triassic reptile Longisquama and theropod dinosaur (or fossil bird) Caudipteryx and Dakotaraptor. According to the University of Kansas, he "has been a leading opponent of the theory that birds are 'living dinosaurs.'" Later he acknowledged a correlation and further contributed. He has also appeared in a few television documentaries about dinosaurs, including Jurassic Fight Club.

He died of cancer at the age of 69 on March 9, 2013, after a long battle with the disease.
