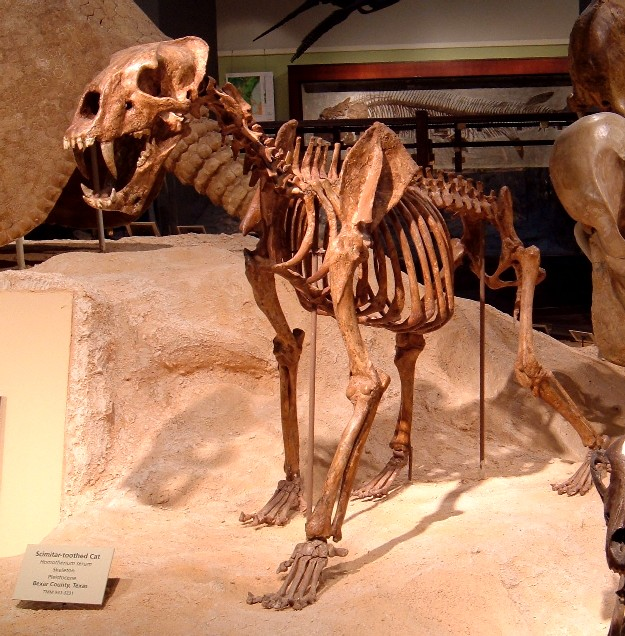
- Skeleton of H. serum from Friesenhahn cave, Texas Science & Natural History Museum, University of Texas at Austin, Austin, Texas.

Scientific classification
- Kingdom: Animalia
- Phylum: Chordata
- Class: Mammalia
- Order: Carnivora
- Family: Felidae
- Subfamily: †Machairodontinae
- Tribe: †Homotherini
- Genus: †Homotherium; Fabrini, 1890

Type species
- †Homotherium latidens Owen, 1846

Other species
- †H. ischyrus (Merriam, 1905); †H. serum? (Cope, 1893); †H.? venezuelensis Rincón et al., 2011; †H. crenatidens? Fabrini, 1890; For others, see text

Synonyms
- Dinobastis Cope, 1893; Ischyrosmilus Mawby, 1965; Hemimachairodus Koenigswald, 1974

= Homotherium =

Homotherium Temporal range: Early Pliocene to Late Pleistocene, 4–0.012 Ma

Extinct genus of sabertooth cat

Homotherium is an extinct genus of scimitar-toothed cat belonging to the extinct subfamily Machairodontinae that inhabited North America, Eurasia, and Africa, as well as possibly South America during the Pliocene and Pleistocene epochs from around 4 million to 12,000 years ago. A probable descendant of Amphimachairodus, it was one of the last surviving members of Machairodontinae alongside the more famous sabertooth Smilodon, to which it was not particularly closely related. It was a large cat, comparable in size to a lion with a body mass of up to 200 kilograms (440 lb), functioning as an apex predator in the ecosystems it inhabited. It had an elongate neck and relatively elongate legs, a relatively short back and a very short tail, with the mummy of a H. latidens cub of Late Pleistocene age found in Siberia having a plain dark brown coat colour. In comparison to Smilodon, the canines of Homotherium were shorter, though still longer than those of living cats, and it is suggested to have had a different ecology from Smilodon as a moderate speed endurance pursuit predator adapted to running down large prey, such as antelope, equines, bovines, and juvenile mammoths in open habitats, with Homotherium also proposed to have likely engaged in cooperative hunting.

Once widely distributed over most of the world's continents, the genus saw a protracted decline over the course of the Pleistocene, disappearing from Africa during the Early Pleistocene around 1.5 million years ago, and declining in abundance and distribution in Eurasia during the Middle Pleistocene, though with a handful of records in the Late Pleistocene. In North America, the genus survived until the end of the Late Pleistocene around 12,000 years ago, becoming extinct as part of the end-Pleistocene extinction event along with most other large animals native to the Americas. This followed the arrival of humans into the Americas, who may have caused a decline in populations of large prey on which Homotherium depended.

== Research history and taxonomy ==
=== Eurasia ===
The first fossils of Homotherium were scientifically described in 1846 by Richard Owen as the species Machairodus latidens, based on Pleistocene aged canine teeth found in Kent's Cavern in Devon, southwestern England by the Reverend John MacEnery in 1826. The name Homotherium (Greek: ὁμός (homos, 'same') and θηρίον (therion, 'beast')) was proposed by Emilio Fabrini in 1890 during a review of machairodont material from the Late Pliocene-Early Pleistocene of Tuscany, Italy, without further explanation, for a new subgenus of Machairodus, whose main distinguishing feature was the presence of a large diastema (gap) between the two lower (inferior) premolars. He further described two species in this new subgenus: Machairodus (Meganthereon) crenatidens and Machairodus (Meganthereon) nestianus, both from Tuscan remains. The genus name itself was rarely used in the scientific literature until the late 1940s.

In 1918, the species Homotherium moravicum was described by Josef Woldřich based on remains found in what is now the Czech Republic. Homotherium davitashvili (also spelled davitasvilii) was described by Abesalom K. Vekua in 1972 based on fragmentary material found at the late Pliocene Kvabebi locality in Georgia in the southern Caucasus. Other material from Odessa in Ukraine was tentatively assigned to this species in 2004. In 1986, the species Homotherium darvasicum was described by Scharif Scharapov based on material from Kuruksay, Tajikistan in Central Asia. In 1989, another species Homotherium tielhardipiveteaui was named by Scharapov based on fossils also found in Tajikistan.

In 1936, Teilhard de Chardin described the new species Homotherium ultimus based on fossils from the Middle Pleistocene-aged Zhoukoudian cave complex near Beijing in northern China. Remains from the late Early Pleistocene-early Middle Pleistocene of Java in Indonesia have also been attributed to this species (as Homotherium ultimum), though others have attributed Javan remains of Homotherium to H. latidens. The also Javan Hemimachairodus zwierzyckii, originally named Epimachairodus zwierzyckii by Gustav Heinrich Ralph von Koenigswald in 1934 and placed in the new genus Hemimachairodus by the same author in 1974 (with indeterminate fossils attributed to Hemimachairodus also reported from Tajikistan), is now also regarded as a synonym of Homotherium. In 1996, Homotherium hengduanshanense was described based on fossils of Late Pliocene-Early Pleistocene age from the Hengduan Mountains of Sichuan, southwestern China. Indeterminate remains of Homotherium have been reported from the Siwalik Hills of the northern Indian subcontinent, of Early - early Middle Pleistocene age.

In a 1954 publication, Jean Viret proposed that Homotherium crenatidens was the applicable species name for much of the Homotherium material in the Late Pliocene-Early Pleistocene of Europe. While Ficcarelli in 1979 regarded H. crenatidens and H. latidens as distinct species, this was disputed by Alan Turner in a 1999 publication, who considered that the proposed morphological differences separating the two species were invalid and the two species were not distinct.

A 2014 review recognised only one species of Homotherium in Eurasia during the Late Pliocene-Pleistocene, Homotherium latidens. Other named Homotherium species from this time period, including H. crenatidens, were found not to be distinct. Across time and space, the remains of H. latidens display considerable morphological variability, though there does not appear to be any clear pattern in this variation temporally or geographically (with the exception of the presence of "pocketing" of the margin of the masseteric fossa of the mandible appearing in Middle and Late Pleistocene H. latidens, but not earlier ones), with the morphological variation of the entire span of Homotherium in Eurasia from the Late Pliocene to the Late Pleistocene being similar to the variation found at the large sample for individuals from the Incarcal locality from the Early Pleistocene of Spain, supporting a single valid species. Some older material from the Pliocene of Eastern Europe (such as that from the Odesa Catacombs in Ukraine) was tentatively considered to belong to a separate species, which a 2026 study suggested should be assigned to the species H. davitashvili. A 2026 review also supported the viewpoint of the 2014 study. Some authors have continued to recognise Homotherium crenatidens as a valid, pan-Eurasian species chronologically earlier than H. latidens, with these authors suggesting that H. crenatidens spans the Late Pliocene-Early Pleistocene, while H. latidens spans the Middle-Late Pleistocene.

=== Africa ===
In 1947/48, Camille Arambourg described the species Homotherium ethiopicum from remains found in the Omo river valley in southern Ethiopia. This publication helped popularise the genus Homotherium, which was little used prior. This species has been later regarded as a nomen dubium, with the type specimen, a lower jaw, possibly actually belonging to Dinofelis (another machairodontine) instead.

In 1972 the species Homotherium problematicum (originally Megantereon problematicus) was named by G. E. Collings, based on fragmentary material from the Makapansgat locality in northeast South Africa, of late Pliocene-Early Pleistocene age. Homotherium hadarensis was described by G. Petter and F.C. Howell in 1988, based on remains found in the Pliocene aged Hadar Formation of the Afar region of northern Ethiopia. In 2015, further material from the Hadar Formation was tentatively referred to H. hadarensis. A third species, Homotherium africanum (originally Machairodus africanus), was named by Arambourg in 1970 based on remains found in Aïn Brimba, in southern Tunisia, North Africa, dating to the early-middle Pliocene. In 1990, Alan Turner challenged the validity of H. problematicum and H. hadarensis, and later authors have generally refrained from referring African Homotherium fossils to any specific species due to their largely fragmentary nature.

In 2021, indeterminate remains of Homotherium were reported from the Tobène locality of northwestern Senegal in West Africa, dating to the Early Pliocene. Indeterminate remains of Homotherium have also been reported from the Ahl al Oughlam locality in northern Morocco, dating to the Late Pliocene.

=== Americas ===
The genus Dinobastis was named by Edward Drinker Cope in 1893, with the type species Dinobastis serus, named in the same publication based on phalanges, a partial femur and several teeth collected from western Oklahoma. In 1905, John Campbell Merriam described a new species of sabertooth cat, Machaerodus ischyrus based on a partial lower jaw found at the foot of the Temblor Range in Kern County, California. Subsequently, in 1918, Merriam reassigned it to a new genus Ischyrosmilus along with the new species Ischyrosmilus idahoensis, based on another lower jaw found in the vicinity of the Snake River in southwestern Idaho. In 1965, the species Ischyrosmilus johnstoni was described by John E. Mawby based on several partial lower jaws, a partial skull and teeth collected from Cita Canyon in Randall County in the Texas panhandle, dating to the Late Pliocene (~3-2.6 million years ago). In the same paper, Mawby noted that a comparative study of both Ischyrosmilus and Homotherium might conclude them as synonyms. Charles Stephen ("Rufus") Churcher argued in 1984 that the remains from Cita Canyon instead represented the Eurasian species Homotherium crenatidens, though Martin et al. 2011 considered them to belong to Homotherium ischyrus.

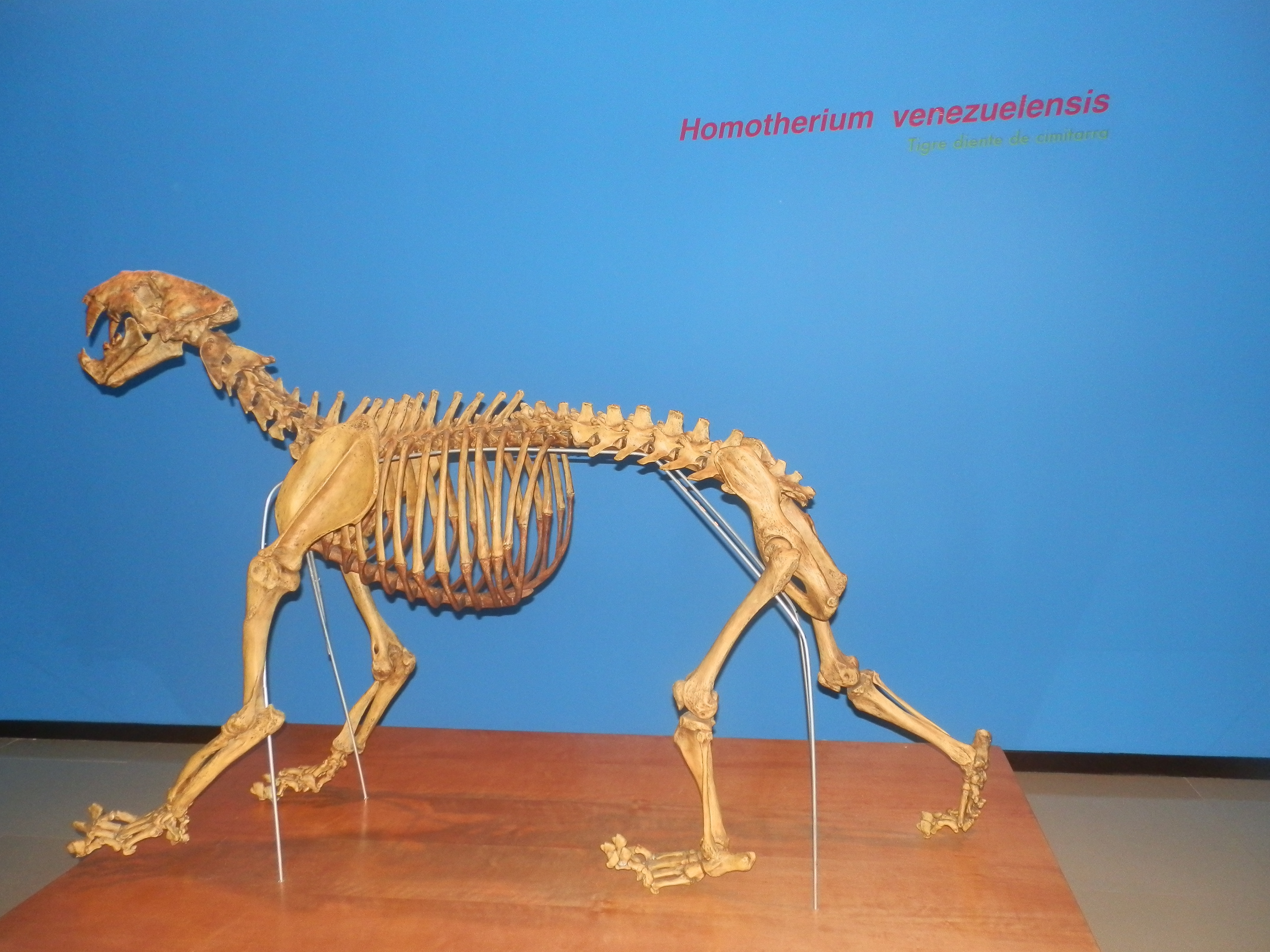
Skeleton of the South American species "Homotherium" venezuelensis, which recent authors have suggested may be better placed in Xenosmilus

In 1966, Churcher deemed Dinobastis as a junior synonym of Homotherium, and recombined D. serus as Homotherium serum. In 1970, a new species Ischyrosmilus crusafonti was described by Charles Bertrand Schultz and Larry D. Martin based on a partial lower jaw from the Early Pleistocene of Morrill County in western Nebraska. After some debate, the genus Ischyrosmilus was declared a junior synonym of Homotherium and all four species were reassigned to that genus in a 1988 publication by Larry Martin, Charles Bertrand Schultz and Marian Othmer Schultz, as H. ischyrus, H. idahoensis, and H. johnstoni. The same paper also proposed keeping Dinobastis serus separate from Homotherium. Ischyrosmilus and Dinobastis are now generally accepted as synonyms of Homotherium. Up to five species of Homotherium have been recognised from North America: H. idahoensis, H. crusafonti, H. ischyrus, H. johnstoni, and H. serum. Martin et al. 2011 recognised two valid species in the Pliocene of North America, H. crusafonti and H. ischyrus, as well as H. serum in the Late Pleistocene (alongside possibly H. latidens in the Late Pleistocene of Alaska). Other authors suggest that there are only two well-supported North American species, with older Blancan (Pliocene-Early Pleistocene) specimens assigned to the species H. ischyrus, while the younger ones (mostly Late Pleistocene in age) are assigned to the species H. serum. H. serum is morphologically similar to the Eurasian H. latidens (to the degree that H. serum specimens would likely be classified as H. latidens if they were found in Eurasia), which may suggest that they share a close common origin, with H. serum possibly originating from a migration of H. latidens into North America rather than from earlier North American Homotherium. Some authors have considered H. serum to be a junior synonym of H. latidens.

In 2011, a new species Homotherium venezuelensis was described by Ascanio Rincón et al. based on a partially crushed skull along with several partial lower jaws and teeth collected from tar seep deposits of Early to Middle Pleistocene age (around 1-0.5 million years ago) of Monagas in northeastern Venezuela. In 2022 and 2023, Jiangzuo et al. proposed that Homotherium venezuelensis be reassigned to the closely related homotheriin genus Xenosmilus (a genus originally described for Early Pleistocene aged fossils found in Florida) which was endorsed by Manzuetti et al. in 2024. Homotheriin remains had previously been reported from South America in the form of a lower jaw from southern Uruguay in 2004, dating to sometime between the Late Pliocene and the Middle Pleistocene, which the original 2004 study and Manzuetti et al. 2024 attributed to cf. Xenosmilus. The 2022 and 2023 studies found that Xenosmilus was nested within Homotherium as traditionally defined (with H. ischyrus more closely related to Xenosmilus than to other Homotherium species), making Homotherium without including the species in Xenosmilus paraphyletic.

== Description ==
Size comparison of Homotherium latidens compared to a human

Homotherium reached a length of around 1.5–2 m (4 ft 11 in – 6 ft 7 in), a height of 0.9–1.1 m (2 ft 11 in – 3 ft 7 in) at the shoulder and a maximum weight of around 200 kg (440 lb) to 250 kg (550 lb), comparable in size to a living lion or tiger. Homotherium probably exhibited size-based sexual dimorphism, with males suggested to be larger than females. Compared to Smilodon, the legs were proportionally longer, and the forelimbs were less powerfully built, being narrow and intermediate in form between those of cheetahs and lions. The neck was relatively long and thick with a high degree of flexibility, while the back was relatively short. The tail was very short. The claws were small and semi-retractable, the dewclaw being large, with the second phalanges being less asymmetrical than those of lions, giving the feet a dog-like posture. The part of the humerus closest to the foot was narrow, with the olecranon fossa (a depression on the end of the humerus closest to the elbow joint) being strongly vertical. Also, the anterior trochlea in Homotherium is more mediolaterally compressed than in Smilodon, representing another adaptation for cursoriality. The hindfeet were held in a raised digitigrade posture. Homotherium likely walked with a posture intermediate between that of living big cats and hyenas, similar to that of canids. The calcaneus and metatarsal bones of the hindfoot were relatively short.

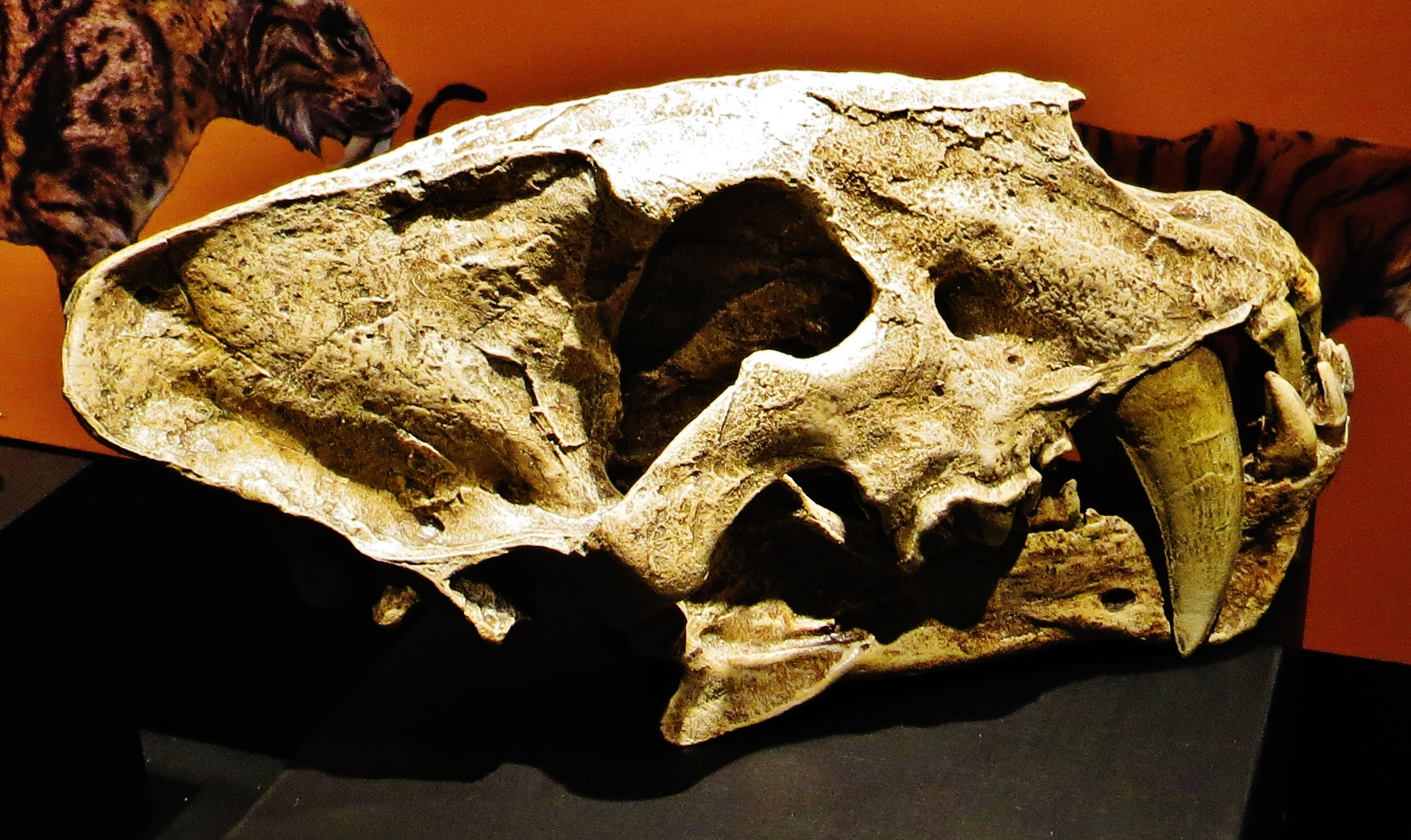
Skull of H. latidens/crenatidens

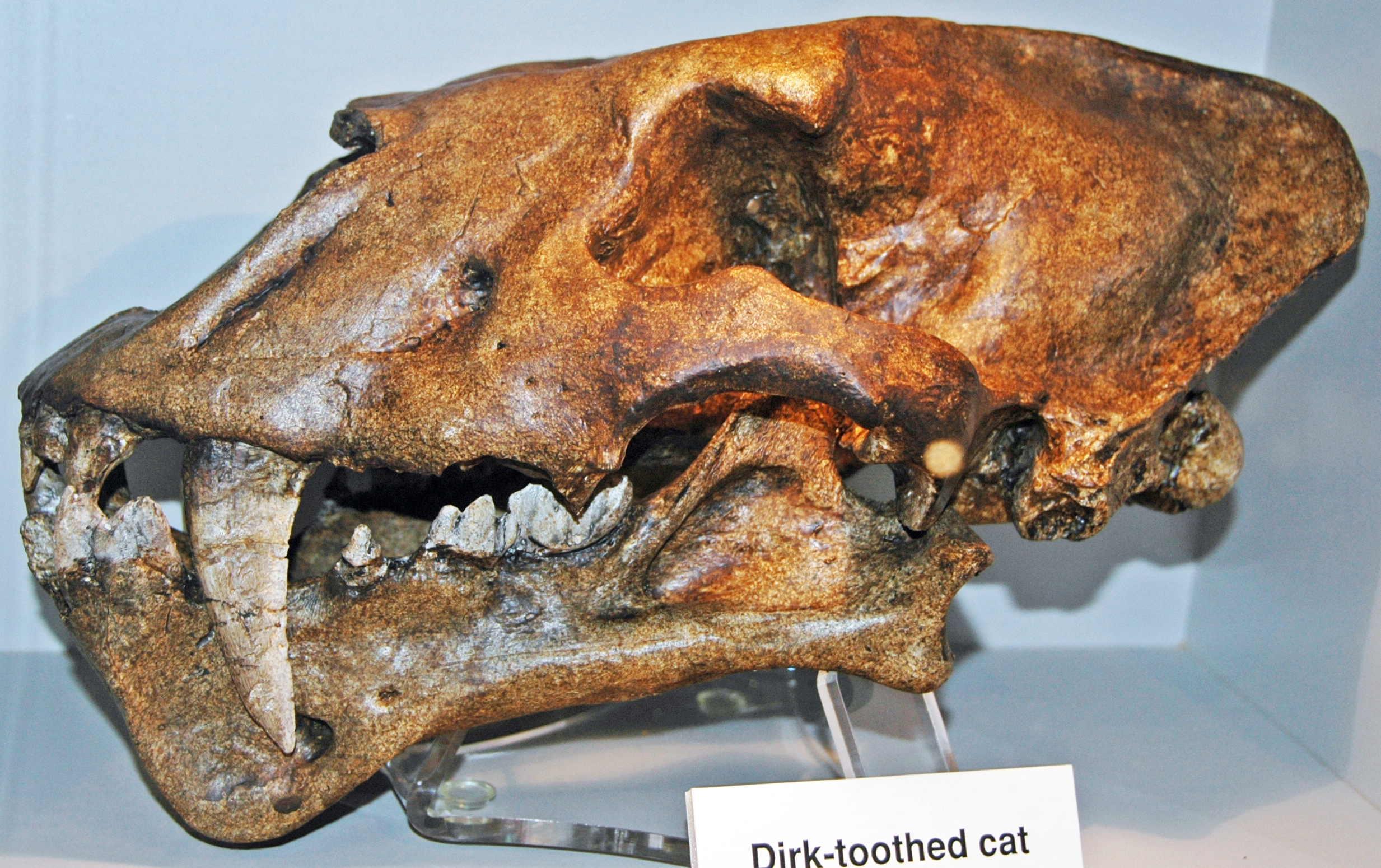
Skull of H. serum

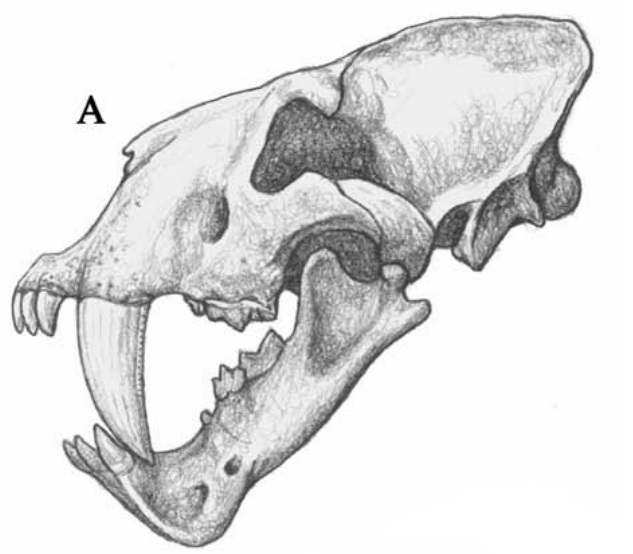
Generalized Homotherium skull illustration by Mauricio Anton

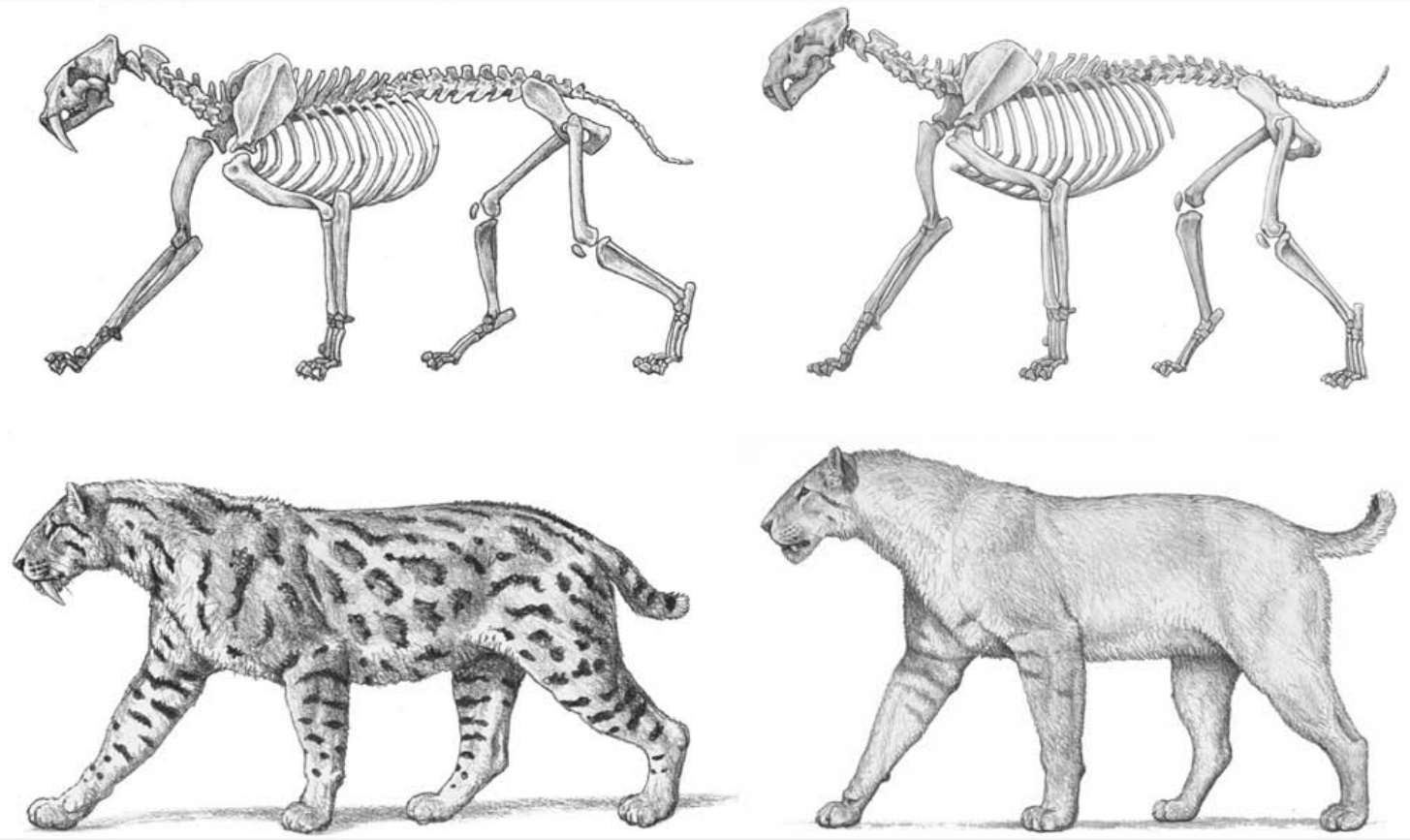
Comparison between the skeletons and reconstructions of Smilodon (left) and Homotherium (right)

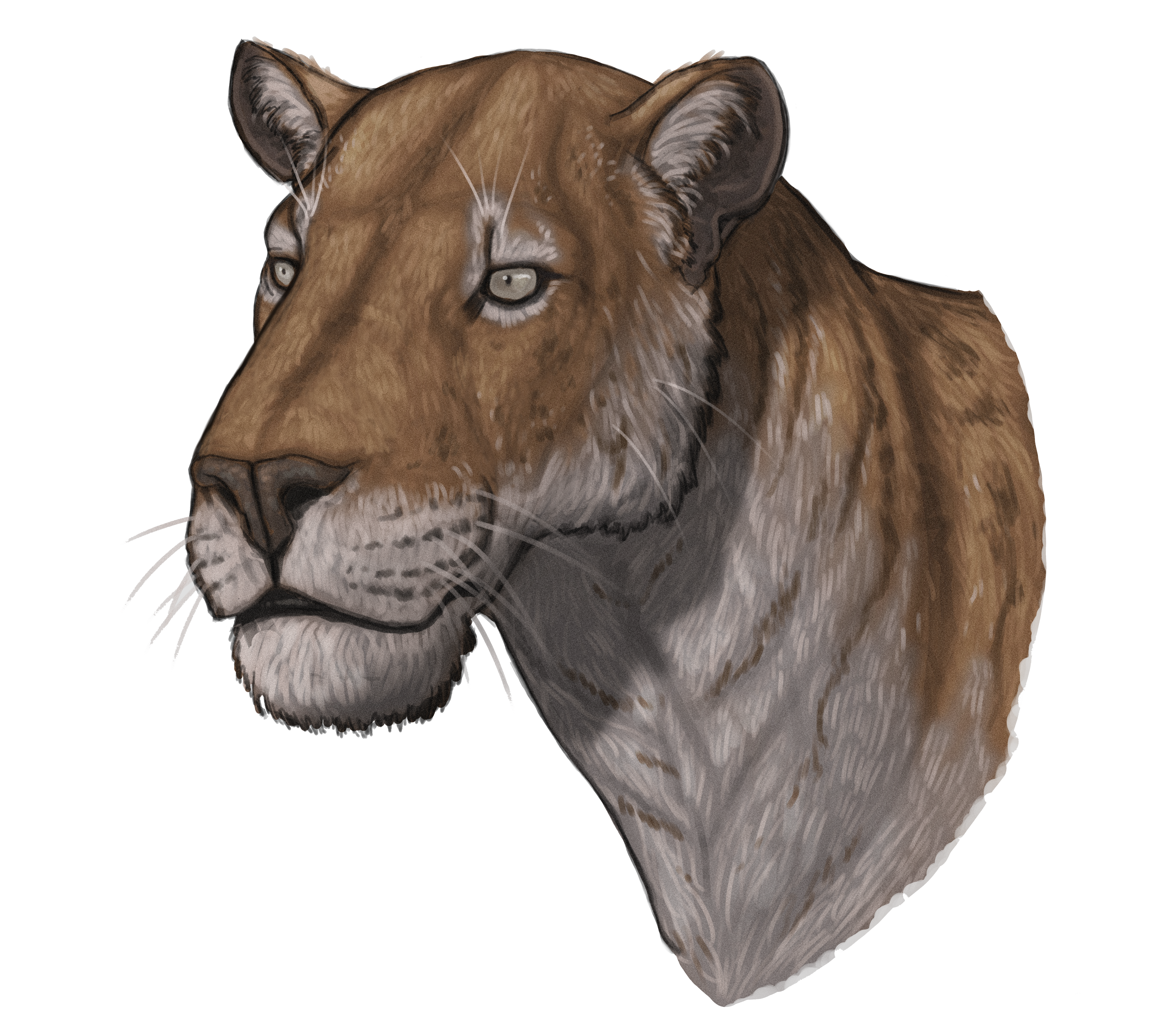
Life restoration of the head and neck of Homotherium latidens

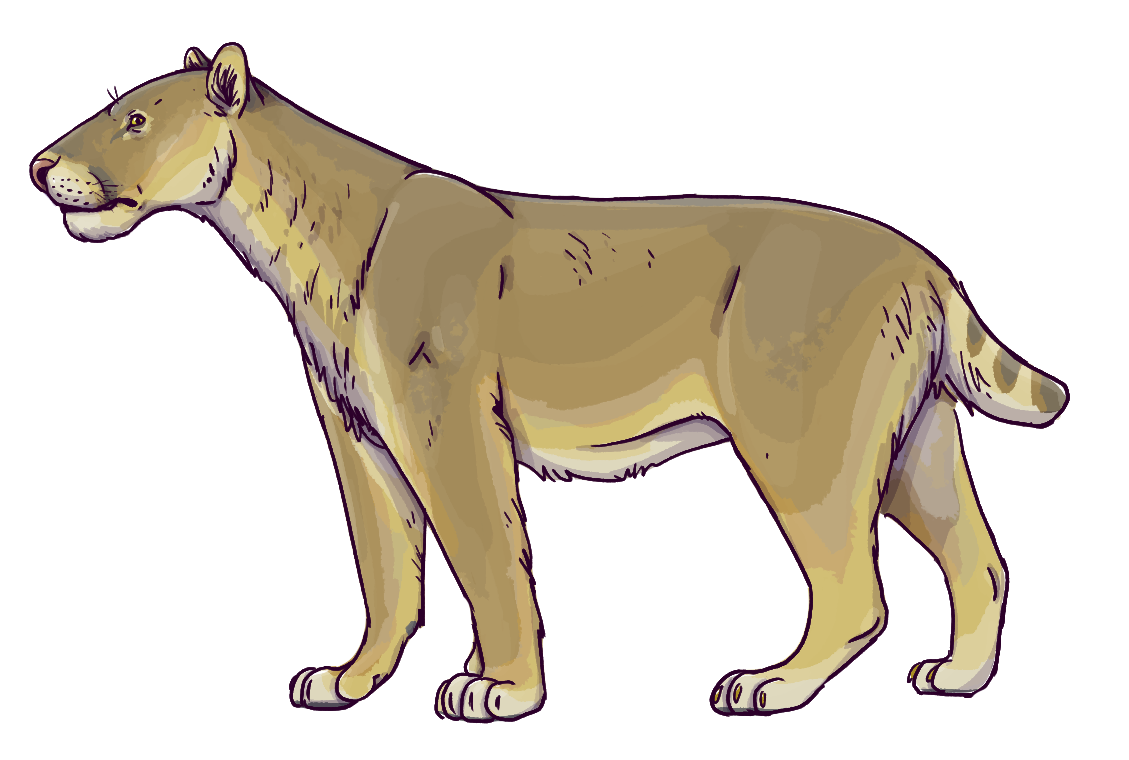
Life restoration of Homotherium latidens

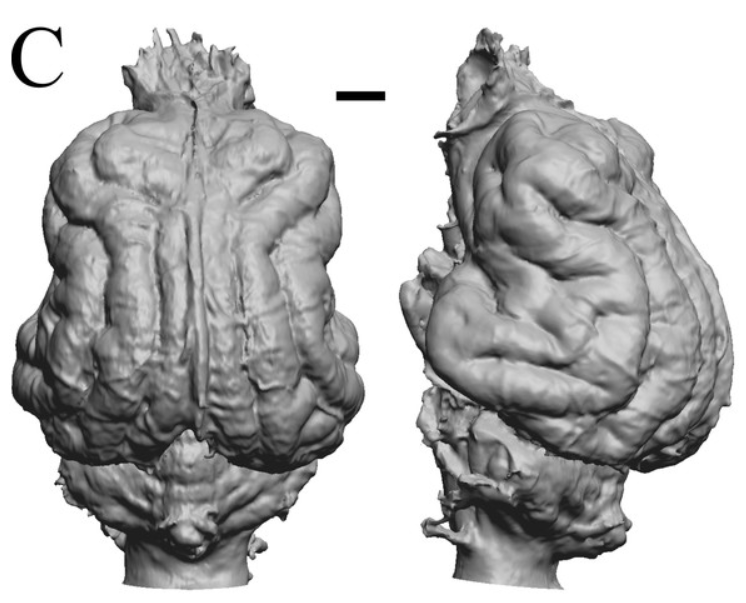
Digital endocast of the cranial cavity of Homotherium sp. (AMNH FM 95297 = FMNH PM 58891).

In comparison to its likely ancestor Amphimachairodus, the upper incisors display stronger serration, are larger and more arched, the upper second premolar (P2) is always absent, and the upper and lower third premolars (P3 and p3) are smaller, and the morphology of the upper fourth premolar (P4) displays differences. The Pliocene-Early Pleistocene North American H. ischyrus differs from the Eurasian H. latidens in having better developed upper and lower third premolars bearing three cuspids/cusps, with their mandibular rami (the upper posterior part of the lower jaw that articulates with the skull) being in comparison to H. latidens relatively low and elongate.

Compared to living pantherine big cats such as tigers and lions, Homotherium has a more elongate and narrower skull with a more elevated snout region, with the top of the skull (dorsal region) having a more straight outline with a high sagittal crest. Homotherium had shorter upper canine teeth than members of the machairodont tribe Smilodontini such as Smilodon or Megantereon, but these were still longer than those of extant cats. Its large upper canine saber teeth are broad, distinctly flattened and coarsely serrated. The large upper canines of Homotherium were likely hidden by the lips and gum tissues of the upper and lower jaws when the mouth was closed, similar to extant cats and unlike the larger upper canines of Smilodon. This hypothesis is further supported by comparable space between the canines and mandible at full closure of the jaws to modern cats; while Smilodon has significantly more space in this respect, likely for soft tissue to fit between the canine and mandible. The incisors are enlarged relative to those of modern big cats, and arranged in an arc at the front of the jaws, similar to hyenas and canines. The joining region between the two halves of the lower jaw (mandibular symphysis) is angular and high, with the coronoid process of the mandible being relatively short.

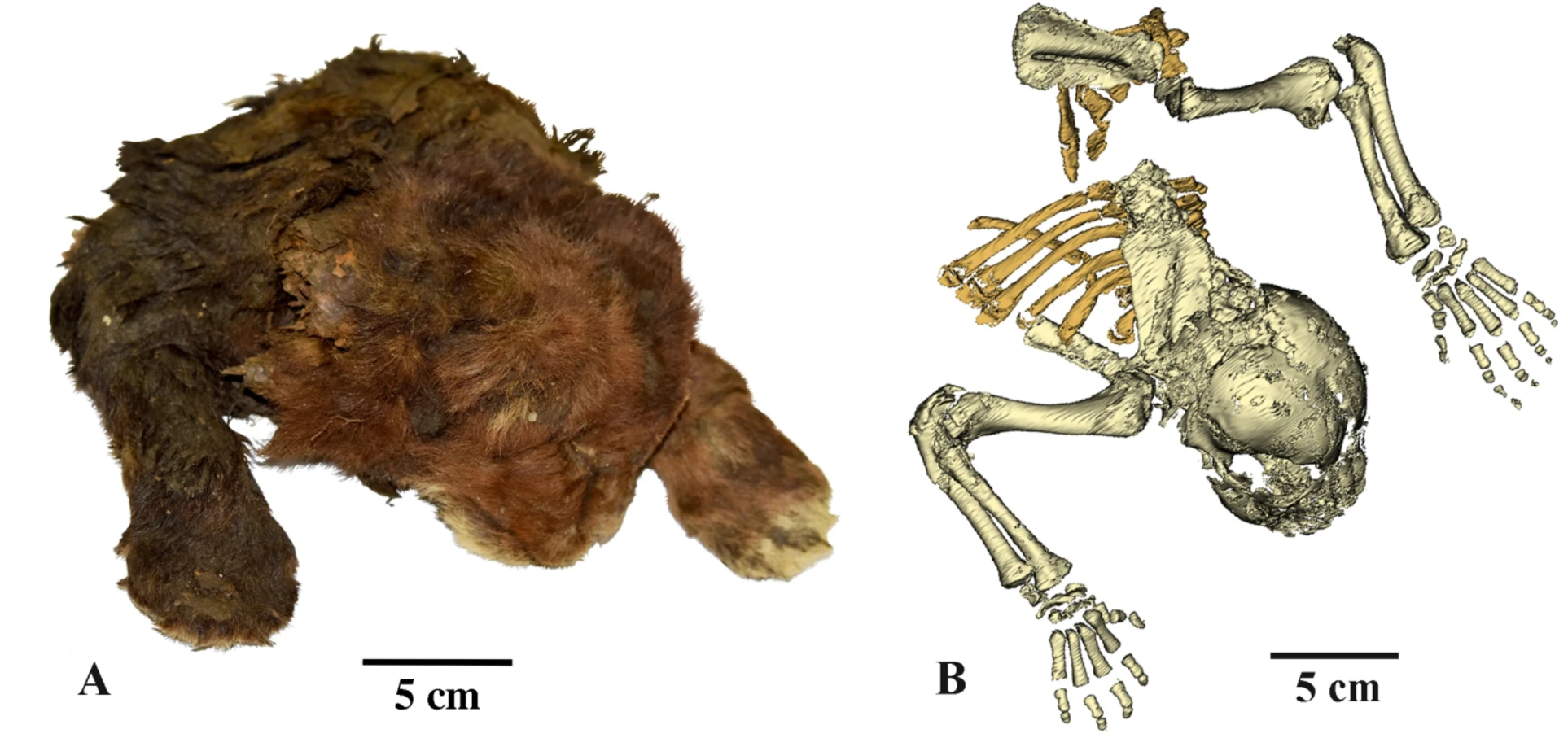
Mummified specimen of a H. latidens cub found in Siberia

Preserved soft tissue of a three-week old cub of a H. latidens found in Siberia in 2020 and described in 2024 shows that the coat color for at least the juveniles of this species was a black or dark brown color with pale fur on the paws and chin. The fur on the corners of the mouth and back of the neck were longer than on the forelimbs of the mummy, and the pelage is generally dense all over the body. Additionally, the cub had wide rounded paws lacking a carpal pad. These are thought to be adaptations to living in snowy environments, and the fact that a three-week old had these features indicates that they developed them at a young age. A study on the microstructure of the cub's hair revealed that the medulla (the innermost part of the hair strand) made up only a relatively small part of the total diameter of the hair strands, suggesting that the heat-protective properties of the hair were poor and lacked specific adaptations to cold environments. It is likely that the cub was born in spring and died in summer.

== Paleobiology and paleoecology ==
Homotherium is suggested to have been adapted to hunting large prey. The reduced claws, relatively slender and long limbs, and sloping back all appear to be adaptations for the lifestyle of a pursuit predator engaging in moderate-speed endurance running (similar to hyenas, but unlike the short distance high speed sprint running exemplified by the living cheetah) in open habitats. The running-adapted morphology of its forelimbs suggests that they were less useful than those of Smilodon or many living big cats in grasping and restraining prey, and that the enlarged incisor teeth at the front of the jaws served an important role in prey restraint, like in hyenas and canids. While somewhat lacking in power, the forelimbs of Homotherium probably did play some role in restraining prey, likely relying on the large dewclaw to grasp effectively as is the case in cheetahs. Homotherium likely adopted an energy efficient galloping stride when pursuing prey. The short calcaneus or heel bone in the hindfoot indicates that Homotherium was probably a less capable jumper compared to modern pantherine big cats, with the shortened calcaneus and metatarsals likely helping to stabilize the foot, perhaps when restraining prey.

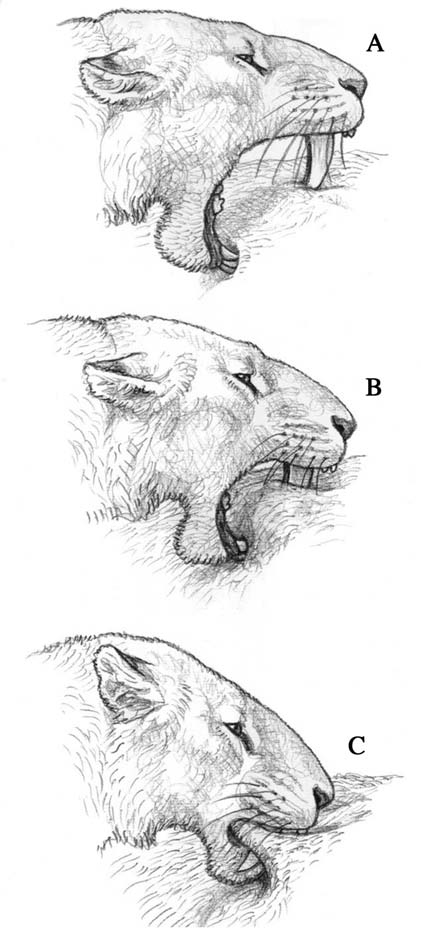
Illustration of Homotherium performing a "canine shear bite" on a prey animal. Artwork by Mauricio Antón.

It has been suggested that Homotherium killed prey by slashing bites to the throat inflicted by its canines, with Homotherium like other sabertooths thought to have been capable of a wider gape than living cats to accommodate enveloping the large canine teeth around its prey. Like other sabertooth cats, Homotherium is widely thought to have used a "canine shear bite" technique, where, once the prey was immobilized and the jaws opened around the throat of the prey, the neck muscles of Homotherium were used to force the skull and the saber canine teeth downwards, more specifically via a downward rotation of the skull, to puncture the throat of prey. These throat bites would likely have caused massive blood loss resulting in rapid death. The elongate and strong neck likely allowed fine control enabling the head to be precisely located, orientated and held in position for the bite, allowing the canine saberteeth to avoid hitting bone which could damage them. However, some recent authors have suggested that its style of prey restraint was probably different to that of Smilodon (which had more powerful forelimbs which helped to better restrain prey) with a killing technique more similar in some aspects to the clamp-and-hold technique used by living big cats like lions, with the saber teeth of Homotherium better able to resist sideways directed forces induced by struggling prey without fracturing than those of Smilodon. Dental microwear analysis of specimens of H. serum from North America suggests that Homotherium regularly consumed tough-fleshed prey, but only engaged in defleshing and did not engage in bone crunching/crushing, similar to cheetahs but unlike living lions and hyenas.

It has been speculated based on its adaptation to open habitats and high levels of competition from other carnivores, that Homotherium probably relied on group hunting, which would make it easier to take down prey to compensate for their relatively weak forelimbs, increase the size of prey able to be taken, and enable distraction strategies to be employed during hunting, as well as to be better able to defend kills against kleptoparasitism (kill stealing) by other carnivores.

Analysis of the genome of a Homotherium specimen found in permafrost in Yukon in northern Canada, suggests that Homotherium experienced positive selection for genes related to respiration and the circulatory system, which may have been adaptations for endurance running. Positive selection for genes related to vision indicates that sight probably played an important role in hunting, suggesting that Homotherium was a diurnal (daytime) hunter. Selection for genes related to cognition were tentatively suggested by researchers to possibly support the social hunting hypothesis.

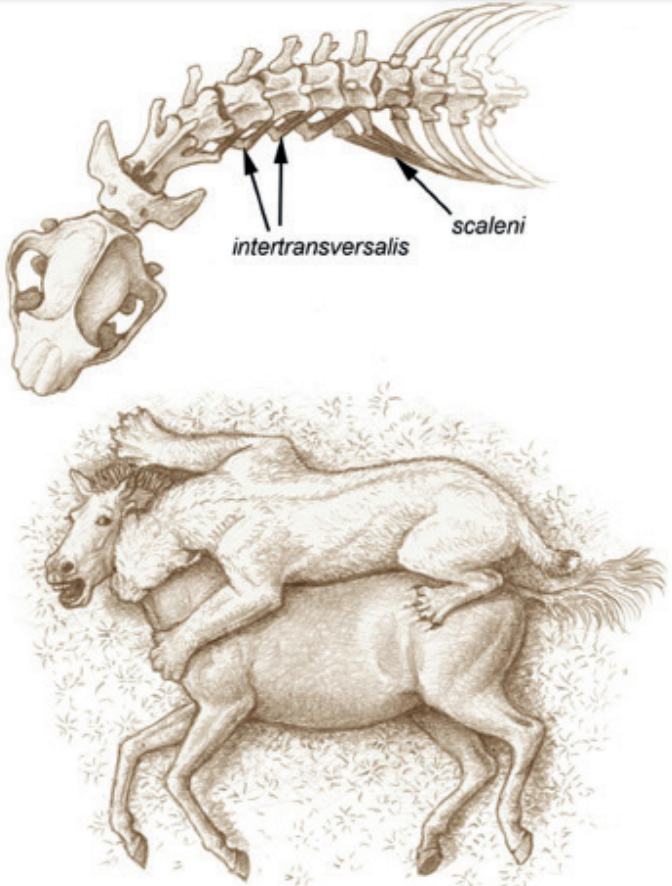
Illustration of Homotherium delivering a killing bite to an equine, along with a diagram of the skull and neck from above, showing muscles involved in positioning head. By Mauricio Antón

Isotope analysis of Homotherium and other animals from the Pliocene of Hadar, Ethiopia, dating to around 3.45–2.95 million years ago, suggests that its prey at this locality were large, on average around 200–300 kilograms (440–660 lb) and primarily consumed C_{3} plants. Prey animals primarily consisted of (in descending order of importance) antelopes belonging to the genus Tragelaphus, the swine Nyanzachoerus, the bovine Ugandax, the three-toed hipparionine equine Eurygnathohippus, and the antelope Damalborea. Homotherium was overlapping in diet though distinct in niche from that of the contemporary hyena Crocuta venustula.

Isotopic analysis of H. latidens from the Venta Micena locality in southeast Spain dating to the Early Pleistocene, around 1.6 million years ago, suggests that at this locality H. latidens was the apex predator and hunted large prey in open habitats, with the equine Equus altidens and bison likely forming a substantial portion of its diet. Juveniles of the mammoth Mammuthus meridionalis may also have formed a significant proportion (up to 10%) of their diet. It may have also occasionally taken other prey, such as juveniles of the large hippo Hippopotamus antiquus. At Venta Micena, Homotherium niche partitioned with the smilodontin sabertooth Megantereon (a close relative of Smilodon) and the "European jaguar" Panthera gombaszoegensis, which hunted somewhat smaller prey in forested habitats. In Early Pleistocene Europe, the giant hyena Pachycrocuta brevirostris is likely to have presented a significant threat capable of stealing H. latidens kills.

Isotope analysis of specimens from Punta Lucero in northern Spain, dating to the early Middle Pleistocene (600-400,000 years ago), suggests that H. latidens at this locality exclusively consumed large (from 45 kilograms (99 lb) to over 1,000 kilograms (2,200 lb)) prey, likely including aurochs, bison, red deer, and/or the giant deer Praemegaceros, and heavily overlapped in diet with the coexisting European jaguar Panthera gombaszoegensis.

In the late Early Pleistocene-early Pleistocene of Java and Early-Middle Pleistocene of China, Homotherium lived alongside the extant tiger, who may have competed with Homotherium.

At the Friesenhahn Cave site in Bexar County, south Texas, which dates to the Late Pleistocene (likely around 20-17,000 years ago, during the Last Glacial Maximum), the remains of almost 400 juvenile (on average around 2 years old) Columbian mammoths were discovered along with numerous Homotherium serum skeletons of all ages, from old adults to cubs. The sloped back and powerful lumbar section of Homotherium's vertebrae suggest that these animals could have been capable of pulling formidable loads; furthermore, broken upper canines - a common injury in fossils of other machairodonts such as Machairodus and Smilodon that would have resulted from struggling with their prey - is not seen in Homotherium, perhaps because their social groups would completely restrain prey items before any of the cats attempted to kill the target with their saber teeth, or because the canines were less frail due to being covered. Moreover, the bones of the young mammoths found in Friesenhahn Cave show distinctive marks matching the incisors of Homotherium, indicating that they could efficiently process most of the meat on a carcass and that the mammoths had been deposited in the caves by the cats themselves and not by scavengers. Examination of the bones also indicates that the carcasses of these juvenile mammoths were dismembered after being killed by the cats before being dragged away, suggesting that Homotherium would disarticulate their kill to transport it to a safe area such as a hidden lair or den and prevent competitors such as dire wolves and American lions from usurping the carcass, with the meatiest parts of the juvenile mammoths like limbs being preferentially transported to the cave. Isotopic analysis of H. serum dental remains at Friesenhahn Cave have confirmed that at this locality it predominantly fed on mammoths along with other C_{4} grazers, like bison and horses in open habitats, as well as possibly C_{4} browsers like the camel Camelops.

Isotopic analysis of H. serum specimens from Eastern Beringia (now Alaska and Yukon) suggests that in this region the species was not a specialised mammoth predator and consumed a variety of large prey, likely including bison, muskox, horse and reindeer, as well as probably woolly mammoths.

=== Palaeopathology ===
A fossil of a palaeopathological H. latidens scapula from Schöningen, Germany reveals that the individual it belonged to suffered from scapular osteoarthritis, as evidenced by a caudal subchondral multilobular cystic lesion found within the mediocaudal glenoid fossa and an osteophyte located on the glenoid fossa's caudal border. The cause of the condition is believed to have been natural aging, physical trauma, or some combination of both of these factors. The slow development of the lesion is indicative of the individual surviving for a considerable length of time after developing the condition, suggesting that this pathology did not hinder the animal's ability to acquire food to any significant degree.

== Evolution and extinction ==
The lineage of Homotherium is estimated (based on mitochondrial DNA sequences) to have diverged from that of Smilodon about 18 million years ago. Homotherium has been suggested to have originated from African species of the genus Amphimachairodus. Homotherium first appeared during the Early Pliocene, with its oldest remains being from the Odesa catacombs in Ukraine around 4.2 million years old, Koobi Fora in Kenya, around 4.35–4.1 million years old, and Kanapoi also in Kenya, dating to around 4.2 million years ago. The genus arrived in North America during the Late Pliocene (~3.6-2.6 million years ago). On the African continent, the genus disappeared about 1.5 million years ago, during the Early Pleistocene. Remains either attributed to Homotherium or Xenosmilus are known from Venezuela in northern South America, suggested to date to the late Early - early Middle Pleistocene, around 1-0.5 million years ago.

Eurasian Homotherium began to decline in size during the latest part of the Early Pleistocene, and its body mass decline continued over the Middle Pleistocene, along with becoming increasingly rare in the Eurasian fossil record. This may be due to competition with other predators, such as the very large lion Panthera fossilis that arrived in Europe at the beginning of the Middle Pleistocene, and/or archaic humans. Across northern and southern China, Homotherium is thought to have gone extinct sometime during the Middle Pleistocene. The latest well-dated records of Homotherium in Europe date to the late Middle Pleistocene, around 300-200,000 years ago, with the exception of a single lower jaw bone from the North Sea which has been radiocarbon dated to around 28-30,000 years ago. It has been suggested that this may represent a Late Pleistocene dispersal from North America, rather than a continuous undocumented occupation of the region. In 2024, a mummy of a Homotherium latidens cub was reported from the Upper Pleistocene from the Badyarikha River, Yakutia in northeastern Siberia, dating to 35,471–37,019 years Before Present, marking the first recorded presence of the species in the Late Pleistocene of Asia. In 2026, additional upper canine teeth of Homotherium latidens were reported from Late Pleistocene deposits of the Bolshoy Lyakhovsky Island and Kolyma River basin in far northeastern Siberia, respectively dated and calibrated to 38,195–42,755 and 37,192–38,953 years Before Present based on bone collagen extracted from each specimen.

The youngest well dated remains of Homotherium serum date to around 12,715–12,655 years Before Present, found in southern Alberta, Canada, at the very end of the Late Pleistocene. Homotherium serum became extinct as part of the end-Pleistocene extinction event of most large mammals across the Americas. The extinction of Homotherium, along with fellow sabertooth Smilodon, at the end of the Late Pleistocene in North America has been suggested to be the result of the decline and extinction of the large prey species on which they depended.

== Relationship with humans ==
Homotherium has a long history of co-occurrence with archaic humans across Afro-Eurasia, ranging from Australopithecus in the Pliocene of Africa, to Peking Man in Zhoukoudian cave in the Early-Middle Pleistocene of China and Homo heidelbergensis in the Middle Pleistocene of Europe. The decline of Homotherium latidens in Eurasia during the Middle Pleistocene may have been the result of competition with archaic humans, in combination with other factors.

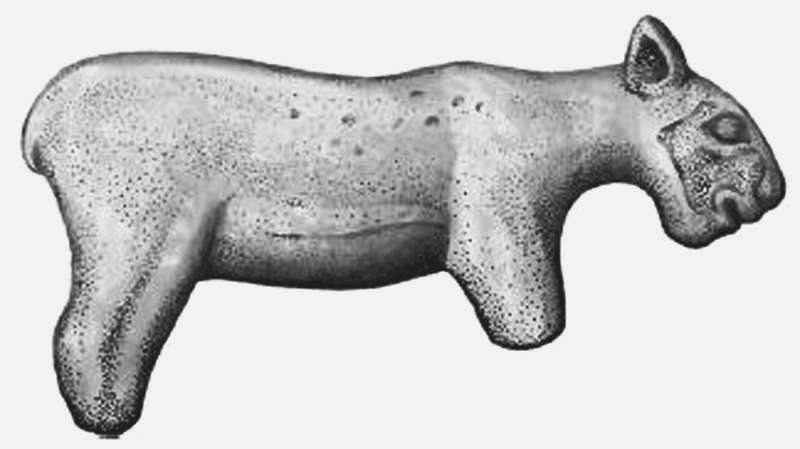
Image of a now lost Upper Paleolithic figurine found in Isturitz cave, France, which has been controversially argued by some to depict Homotherium, though others suggest it represents a cave lion (Panthera spelaea)

Isotopic analysis of the canine teeth of H. latidens found in Kent's Cavern indicated that they were isotopically distinct from other animal remains found in the cave. This, along with the absence of any other non-tooth remains of Homotherium in the cave, has led authors to suggest that the teeth (including canines as well as incisors) were deliberately transported into the cave by humans during the Palaeolithic from further afield (possibly from mainland Europe), perhaps as a kind of trade good. The teeth are suggested to have experienced considerable weathering prior to being taken into Kent's Cavern, and it is unclear whether these teeth were taken from the remains of then-relatively recently dead Homotherium or subfossil remains of long-dead Homotherium individuals. Human transport may also explain the presence of a Homotherium canine found in Late Pleistocene layers of Robin Hood's cave in the Creswell Crags of Derbyshire, central England. Although a felid humerus from the late Middle Pleistocene Schöningen site in Germany was originally claimed to represent Homotherium and to have been used as a tool by Neanderthals, later analysis suggested that the humerus represented that of a lion (Panthera fossilis or Panthera spelaea) that instead had been scavenged by hyenas.

A now-lost Upper Palaeolithic figurine found in Isturitz cave in southwest France has been suggested by some authors to represent Homotherium, but other authors have argued that it more likely represents a cave lion based on its anatomical proportions and the much greater abundance of cave lion remains compared to those of Homotherium in Late Pleistocene Europe.

At the end of the Late Pleistocene in North America, Homotherium serum co-existed with Paleoindians, the first humans to inhabit the Americas. The effect of human hunting of large herbivores which H. serum relied upon may have been a contributory factor in its extinction along with other large carnivores in North America.
