= Küçükçekmece (fossil site) =

Fossil site in Turkey

- Stratigraphic range: Serravallian
- Type: Fossil site

Location
- Coordinates: 41.0°N 28.8°E
- Region: Marmara
- Country: Turkey

Type section
- Named by: Lartet, 1834
- Küçükçekmece (fossil site) (Turkey)

Küçükçekmece (or Kurtchuk-Tchekmedje) is a Miocene fossil deposit in the Küçükçekmece municipality of Istanbul, Turkey. It is one of the most well documented fossil sites in the region around Istanbul.

== History ==
The site was originally documented by Ahmet Malik in 1932, where after seeing reports of Miocene fossils in the region, took students to study there in for a geology field course. Working with a fellow University of Istanbul geologist Hamit Nafiz Pamir they documented a wealth of fossils which were identified by comparing them to other similar aged fossil sites in Greece, Iran, and France. such as which where stored at the University's Institute of Geology majority of fossils where lost in a fire in 1942. Unfortunately this building was destroyed by a fire in 1942 and most of these fossils where lost.

Since then research scattered and infrequent. The best collection of Material was collected by Father Jean Nicolas from 1957-1967 and stored in the Natural History Museum of Paris. This Material as well as the surviving material from Malik's collections were redescribed in 2016 by Sen et al., providing more information on the site.

== Stratigraphy ==
Both the original collections by Malik and Pamir and the collection from Jean Nicolas were taken from the same sand gravel horizon. The horizon sits between the underlying green clays and the overlying clays and sands of the Güngören formation. They are part of the Çekmece Group, which is made from a series of river, brackish, and lagoon deposits left over from the Paratethys sea.

The site itself is formed in the Çukurçeşme Formation a 30-40 meters deep. It is made up of current bedded and loose sandstone and supports a combination of marine and terrestrial elements.

== Depositional environment ==
During this time the site was on the shores of the Paratethys sea. This sea stretched across eastern Europe and held a great diversity of life. Yet, by the time of Küçükçekmece, the sea became cut from the Atlantic due to a rising mountain range. Without the marine influence the only source of water available to the sea came from freshwater sources, reducing the lakes salinity. In addition, falling amounts of CO2 in the atmosphere triggered a global cooling event. This put strong ecological stress on the organisms living in the sea. The sea level lowered and the salinity of the water was reduced, wiping out many species of saltwater fish, and destabilizing the marine community. Despite this, the land still supported a diverse ecosystem. The fossil site was formed from a river delta, while studies of the micro-mammals and the presence of Hipparion at the site suggest a wet forested environment.

The fossil site would've stood at the crossroads between Europe, Asia and Africa, supporting 37 different species of mammals including rhinos, bears, machairodonts, giant tortoises and hyenas. Plant fossils are poorly known from the region. Underwater, the desalination of the sea lead to a highly reduced aquatic ecosystem., and it is likely that the marine mammals found at this site became dwarfs from the lack of these resources.

== Paleobiota ==
=== Osteichthyes ===
==== Labriformes ====
Genus	Species	Family	Material	Notes	Image
Labridae indet.	indeterminate	Labridae		A Wrasse	

==== Spariformes ====
Genus	Species	Family	Material	Notes	Image
Sparidae indet.	indeterminate	Sparidae		A seabream	

==== Siluriformes ====
Genus	Species	Family	Material	Notes	Image
Heterobranchus	H. sp	Clariidae		An Airbreathing catfish	
Silurus	S. aff. serdicensis	Siluridae		related to the modern Wel's catfish	

== Reptiles ==
=== Testudines ===
Genus	Species	Family	Material	Notes	Image
Mauremys	M. aristotelica	Geoemydidae	Humerus and Femur		
Titanochelon	T. kayadibiensis	Testudinidae	Shell material		
Testudo	T. marmorum	Testudinidae	Shell fragments and vertebrae		

=== Lacertilia ===
Genus	Species	Family	Material	Notes	Image
?Anguidae indet.		Anguidae			
Colubrinae indet.		Colubridae			
Natricinae indet		Colubridae			
Varanus	V. sp	Varanidae		A monitor lizard	
Viperidae indet.		Viperidae			

=== Mammals ===
==== Proboscidians ====
Genus	Species	Family	Material	Notes	Image
Choerolophodon	C. pentelici	Choerolophodontidae	Maxila, Mandible, Molars		
Deinotherium	D. cf. giganteum	Deinotheriidae	Incomplete lower tusk, Molar		
Tetralophodont	Tetralophodont form, gen. and sp. indet.		Molars	"Tetralophodont" grade proboscidian material may belong to Amebelodontidae or Zygolophodon	

==== Tubulidentata ====
Genus	Species	Family	Material	Notes	Image
Orycteropus	O. sp	Orycteropodidae		An aardvark	

==== Rodentia ====
Genus	Species	Family	Material	Notes	Images
Byzantinia	B. bayraktepensis	Cricetidae	Maxilla		
Chalicomys	C. jaegeri	Castoridae	Molars, incisors, and astragali		
Spalacidae indet.		Spalacidae	Molars and Incisors	Similar to Sinapospalax, though molars are larger.	

==== Lagomorpha ====
Genus	Species	Family	Material	Notes	Images
Ochotona	O. ozansoyi	Ochotonidae	mandible fragments and teeth	Larger than O. antiqua and O. mediterranensis	

==== Eulipotyphla ====
Genus	Species	Family	Material	Notes	Images
Schizogalerix	S. sp	Erinaceidae	Molar		
Crusafontina	C. cf. endemica	Soricidae	Mandible and limb fragments		

==== Carnivorans ====
Genus	Species	Family	Material	Notes	Image
Machairodus	M.aphanistus	Felidae	Fragmentary Molar and limb material		
Felidae gen. et sp. indet.		Felidae	phalanx	"Medium size" Similar in size to Promeganteron or Metailurus. Teeth assigned to Paramachairodus orientalis likely belongs to this taxon, but where destroyed in the 1942 fire and their identitiy remains uncertian.	
Pristifelis	P. sp. cf. P. attica	Felidae	Mandible with teeth		
cf. Thalassictis	cf. T. sp.	Hyaenidae	Molar	Formerly assigned to Ictitherium	
Mustela	M. pentelici	Mustelidae		Material destroyed in fire, known only from illustrations. Identity uncertain	
Sivaonyx	S. hessicus	Mustelidae	Portion of dentary and Molar	An otter	
Dinocrocuta	D. senyureki	Percrocutidae	Anterior fragment of the dentary, fragment of right maxilla, half of left ulna	Formerly assigned to Percrocuta, assigned to D. senyureki over D. minor based on size	
Cryptophoca	C. maeotica	Phocidae	Several fragments of Mandibles and limb material	Similar to material of other Paratethys seals such as Praepusa and Monachopsis. May include more than one species in material	
Phocidae gen. et sp. indet		Phocidae	Humerus	Larger than Cryptophoca	
Indarctos	I. arctoides	Ursidae	Mandible and Dentition	Species identification unclear assigned to I. arctoides due to this species being known from the late Vallesian-early Turolian, well I.atticus is exclusive to the later Turolian. Molar assigned to Ursavus likely belongs to this taxon.	

==== Perissodactyla ====
Genus	Species	Family	Material	Notes	Image
Kalimantsia	K. sp	Chalicotheriidae	Molar fragments and possible phalanx	The first potential postcranial material of Kalimantsia	
Hipparion	H. aff. sebastopolitanum	Equidae	Mandibles, teeth and limb material	Two hipparion species are found here and co-occur at other miocene sites across Europe. H. giganteum is much larger than H. sebastopolitanum. Their presence suggests a warm wet environment.	
Hipparion	H. aff. giganteum	Equidae	Mandibles, teeth and limb material	Two hipparion species are found here and co-occur at other miocene sites across Europe. H. giganteum is much larger than H. sebastopolitanum. Their presence suggests a warm wet environment.	
Ceratotherium	C. neumayri	Rhinoceridae	Limb material and molar		
Chilotherium	C. schlosseri	Rhinoceridae	Mandible fragments and limb material	Formerly assigned to Aceratherium and C. kowalevskii	
Persiatherium	P. sp	Rhinoceridae	Mandible fragments and limb material		

==== Artiodactyls ====
Genus	Species	Family	Material	Notes	Image
Gazella	G. cf. ancyrensis	Bovidae	Horn core and molar	Straight horn characteristic of early gazelles	
Majoreas	M. cf. elegans	Bovidae	Horn-core and mandible		
cf. Miotragocerus	cf. M. sp.	Bovidae	maxilla and mandibula	lack of cranial material makes identification difficult	
Prostrepsiceros	P. sp	Bovidae	Horn-core and mandible	Pr. rotundicornis, material is too poor for definite identification	
aff. Protoryx	aff. P. cf. enanus	Bovidae	Horn-core and molar	medium sized bovid with simple "gazelle like" horn cores. Similar to Capra bohlini and Protoryx solignaci, but more data is needed for identification.	
Cetotherium	C. priscum	Cetotheriidae		considered nomina dubia under Gol'din and Startsev 2017	
Bohlinia	B. cf. attica	Giraffidae	limb elements and ossicone		
Eurhinodelphis	E. aff. longirostris	Eurhinodelphinidae			
Palaeogiraffa	P. pamiri	Giraffidae	Maxilla and limb elements	Proportions are similar to Sivatheres	
Palaeotragus	P. sp.	Giraffidae	Molar and limb material		
Kentriodon	K. fuchsii	Kentriodontidae			
Archaeocetus	A. fockii	? Mysticeti indet.		likely indeterminate	
Archaeocetus	A. nordmanni	? Mysticeti indet.		likely indeterminate	
Physeterula	P. dubusii	Physeteridae			
Hippopotamodon	H. cf. antiquus	Suidae	Skull and limb material	Morphology and size of teeth better fit H. cf. antiquus then H. major, which they where previouly assigned too.	
Propotamochoerus?	P? sp.	Suidae	Molar and incisor	smaller and better fit the proportions of Propotamochoerus than Hippopotamodon.	
Dorcatherium	D. maliki	Tragulidae	Mandibular remains and limb material	Holotype remains from this site.	
