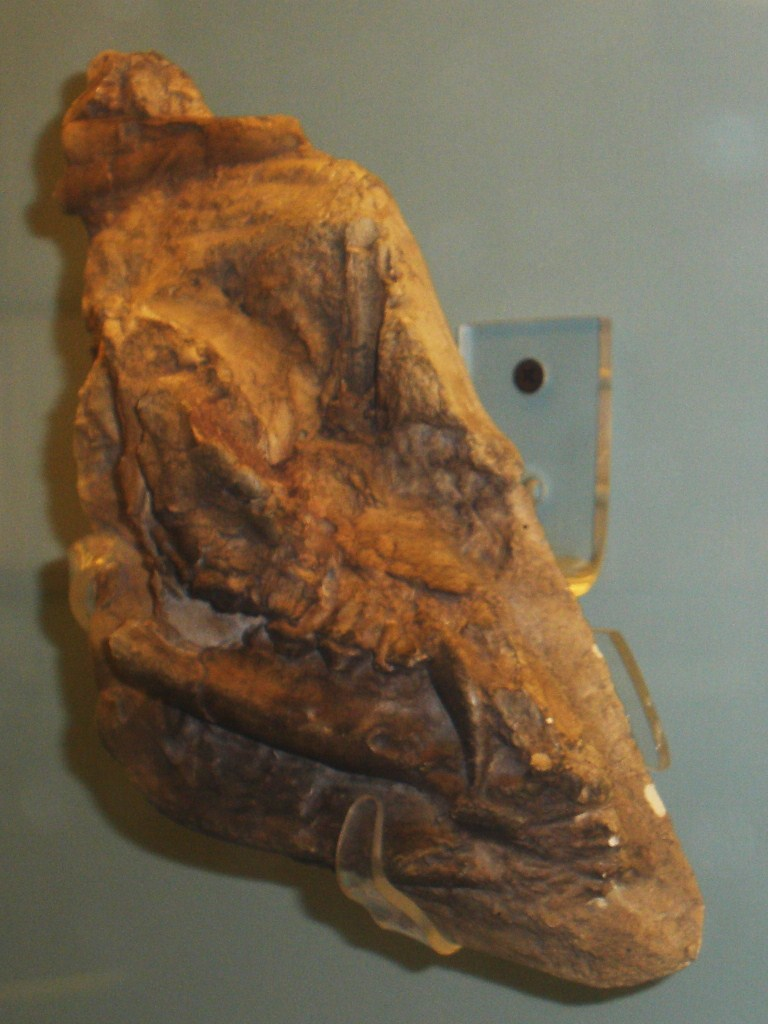

Scientific classification
- Kingdom: Animalia
- Phylum: Chordata
- Class: Mammalia
- Order: Carnivora
- Family: Hyaenidae
- Genus: †Plioviverrops; Kretzoi, 1938

Type species
- †Plioviverrops orbignyi Gaudry & Lartet, 1856

Other species
- †P. gervaisi De Beaumont & Mein, 1972; †P. gaudryi De Beaumont & Mein, 1972; †P. faventinus Torre, 1989; †P. guerini? Villalta Comella & Crusafont Pairó, 1945

Synonyms
- Genus synonymy: Jourdanictis Viret, 1951; Mesoviverrops De Beaumont & Mein, 1972; Protoviverrops De Beaumont & Mein, 1972; Species synonymy: P. orbignyi: Viverra orbignyi Gaudry & Lartet, 1856; Thalassictis orbignyi Gaudry & Lartet, 1861; Ictitherium orbignyi Gaudry & Lartet, 1862; P. gervaisi: Prognetta? cf. praecurrens Dehm, 1950; P. gaudryi: Jourdanictis grivensis Viret, 1951; P. guerini: Herpestes guerini Villalta Comella & Crusafont Pairó, 1945

= Plioviverrops =

Plioviverrops Temporal range: Early Miocene to Early Pliocene (Orleanian) to (Ruscinian)

Extinct genus of carnivores

Plioviverrops is an extinct genus of hyaenids that were native to Europe throughout the Miocene and Early Pliocene. Plioviverrops is unique among most hyaenids in its gradual development towards more hypocarnivorous dentition as opposed to most hyaenids which evolved to have hypercarnivorous dentition. As P. orbignyi had especially reduced and simplified dentition, it has been proposed that P. orbignyi may be ancestral to the genus Proteles, including the modern aardwolf. Plioviverrops may be a paraphyletic group.

Plioviverrops is among the limited number of hyaenid genera that avoided extinction during the Miocene-Pliocene boundary, when canids first arrived in Eurasia.

== Characteristics ==
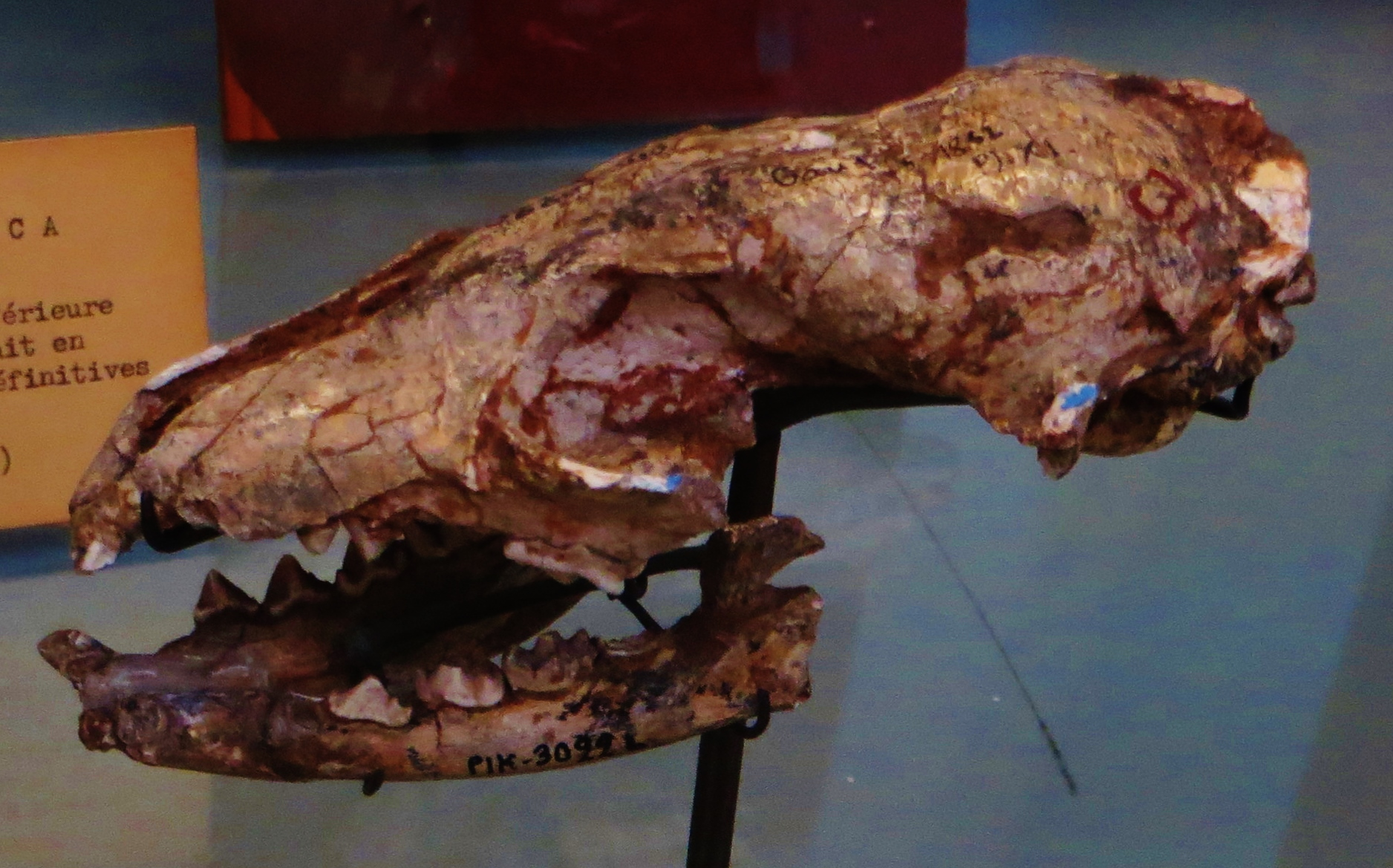
Skull of Plioviverrops orbignyi

Plioviverrops were very small hyaenids that weighed only 2 to 7 kilograms. P. orbignyi and P. faventinus were morphologically similar to the modern herpestids, while P. guerini was more similar to a viverrid. Plioviverrops had hypocarnivorous dentition. Its auditory bullae were primitive in structure and, besides the presence of an alisphenoid canal in Plioviverrops, were similar to those of Proteles.

== Species ==
Up to five species are currently recognized in Plioviverrops by different authors.

=== Plioviverrops orbignyi ===
The type species, P. orbignyi, lived from the Vallesian to the Turolian of the Late Miocene. It has been found in multiple localities in Greece, including Pikermi, Ravin de la Pluie, Samos, and Vathylakkos-2. It had reduced premolars and a long m1 molar with a high metaconid and an especially low trigonid.

=== Plioviverrops faventinus ===
P. faventinus is the most recent Plioviverrops and the species with the most hypocarnivorous dentition. It lived during the Messinian of the Late Miocene. P. faventinus has been discovered in Cava Monticino in Italy where hyaenids such as Plioviverrops and Lycyaena are the most abundant fossil carnivores. P. faventinus was the most numerous hyaenid in Cava Monticino.

=== Plioviverrops gaudryi ===
P. gaudryi lived during the Middle Miocene and has been discovered in La Grive-Saint-Alban in France.

=== Plioviverrops gervaisi ===
P. gervaisi is among the oldest known hyaenids. It lived during the Orleanian of the Early Miocene and has been discovered in Vieux-Collonges in France. The m1 molar of P. gervaisi is very primitive in structure and similar to that of another early hyaenid, Protictitherium intermedium.

=== Plioviverrops guerini ===
P. guerini lived during the Turolian of the Late Miocene. It has been found in multiple localities in Spain, including Los Mansuetos. P. guerini is slightly greater in size but otherwise similar to P. gaudryi in characteristics. Galiano et al. (2022) placed this species in the genus Gansuyaena.

== Diet ==
Plioviverrops was likely an opportunistic omnivore and insectivore. It may have preyed on rodents such as Parapodemus or Micromys. It may have consumed birds, insects, reptiles, and other small animals such as Schizogalerix. It may have eaten fungi and plant matter such as fruits. Morphometry of the teeth of P. faventinus and comparisons of it to extant herpestids and viverrids has found that this species was invertebrivorous and hypocarnivorous.

== Taxonomy ==
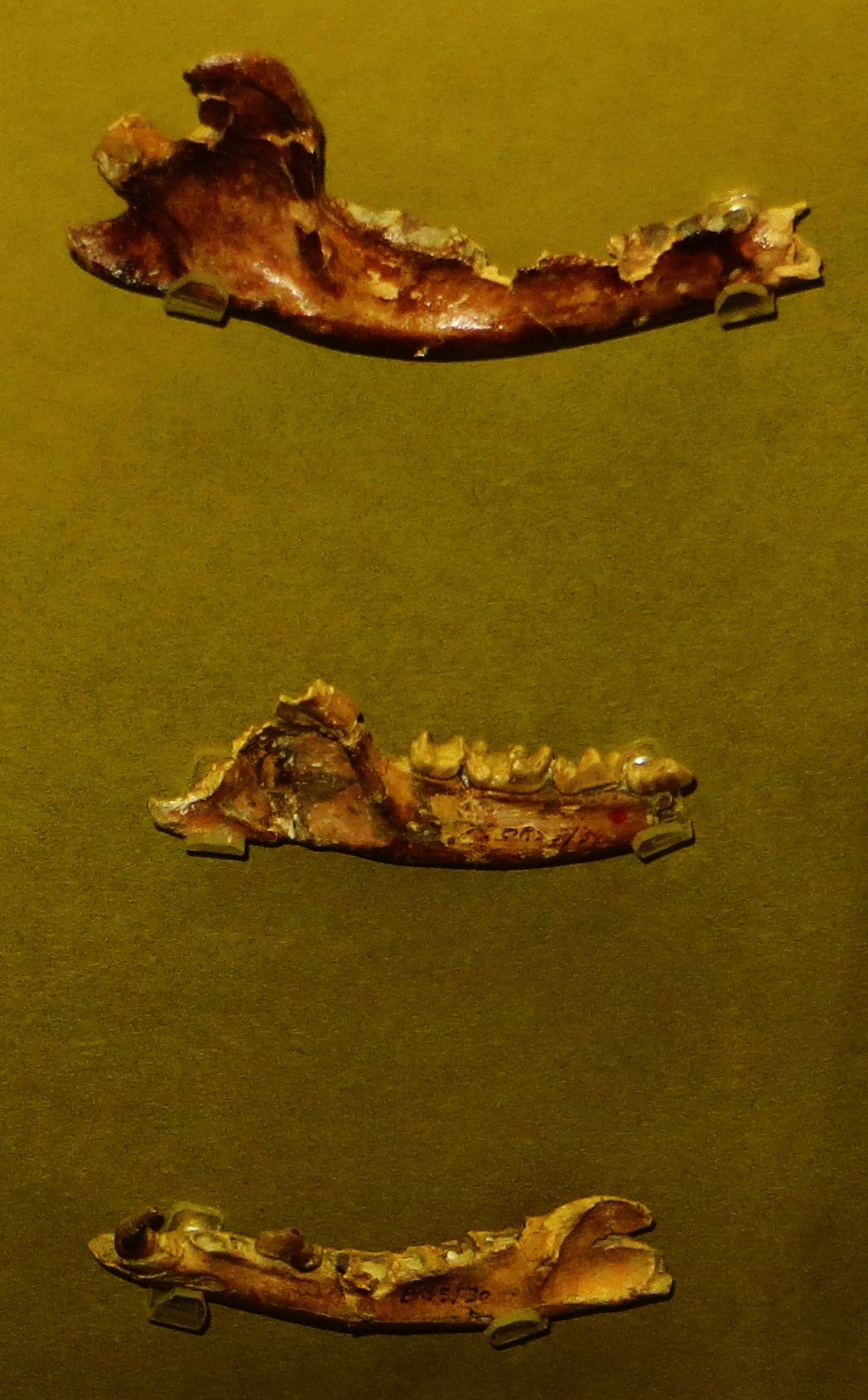
Mandibles of Plioviverrops faventinus

Plioviverrops was named by Kretzoi in 1938, and assigned to Hyaenidae by Flynn in 1998.

Herpestes guerini was described by Villalta Comella & Crusafont Pairó (1945) based on material from Los Mansuetos in Spain. Crusafont Pairó & Petter (1969) reassigned this species to Plioviverrops as Plioviverrops guerini. Recently, Galiano et al. (2022) included this species in the genus Gansuyaena as Gansuyaena guerini. The reassignment of this species to Gansuyaena was questioned by Loddi et al. (2025).

De Beaumont & Mein (1972) established three subgenera for Plioviverrops, including Plioviverrops (Plioviverrops) orbignyi, Plioviverrops (Mesoviverrops) gaudryi, and Plioviverrops (Protoviverrops) gervaisi. Galiano et al. (2022) elevated these subgenera to genera, reassigning P. gaudryi to Mesoviverrops as Mesoviverrops gaudryi and P. gervaisi to Protoviverrops as Protoviverrops gervaisi. Galiano et al. (2022) additionally suggested that Plioviverrops and Mesoviverrops, but not Protoviverrops, should be included in the hyaenid subfamily Protelinae.

De Bonis (1994) described Plioviverrops collectus from material previously known as Herpestides collectus (De Bonis, 1973) from the early Burdigalian of France, and considered it to be the earliest known hyaenid. Turner et al. (2008) noted that while this material was distinct from Herpestides there was not enough evidence to support its assignment to Hyaenidae.
