= Tongxinictis =

Tongxinictis Temporal range: Middle Miocene

Scientific classification
- Domain: Eukaryota
- Kingdom: Animalia
- Phylum: Chordata
- Class: Mammalia
- Order: Carnivora
- Suborder: Feliformia
- Family: Hyaenidae
- Genus: †Tongxinictis; Werdelin & Solounias, 1991

Type species
- †Tongxinictis primordialis Qiu et al., 1988

Synonyms
- Percrocuta primordialis Qiu et al., 1988

Extinct genus of carnivores

Tongxinictis ("Tongxin weasel") is an extinct genus of hyaenids with a single described species, Tongxinictis primordialis. This species lived in China during the Middle Miocene, although an older Early Miocene (Orleanian) age is possible from some localities.

Tongxinictis may represent a basal member of the Percrocutinae, a subfamily of Hyaenidae that contains the genera Percrocuta and Dinocrocuta.

== Taxonomy ==
Percrocuta primordialis was described by Qiu et al. in 1988 based on material from the Middle Miocene of Tongxin. Qiu et al. considered P. primordialis to be the most primitive Percrocuta in addition to being the smallest. Werdelin & Solounias, in their 1991 review of the Hyaenidae, erected the genus Tongxinictis with T. primordialis as the type species. The decision to erect a new genus for this species was influenced by the assumption that the auditory bullae of percrocutids were dissimilar to those of hyaenids due to figures from Qiu et al.. Werdelin & Solounias considered the auditory bullae of T. primordialis to be typical of hyaenids and as such believed this species was not closely related to Percrocuta, Dinocrocuta, or other genera they referred to the family Percrocutidae. A study by Wuyang in 2022 proposed that Percrocuta and Dinocrocuta belong to Hyaenidae and to the hyaenid subfamily Percrocutinae, with Tongxinictis possibly representing the most basal member of this subfamily due to its similarities with the latter two genera. Wuyang considered Tongxinictis to be the smallest and most primitive member of Percrocutinae.
