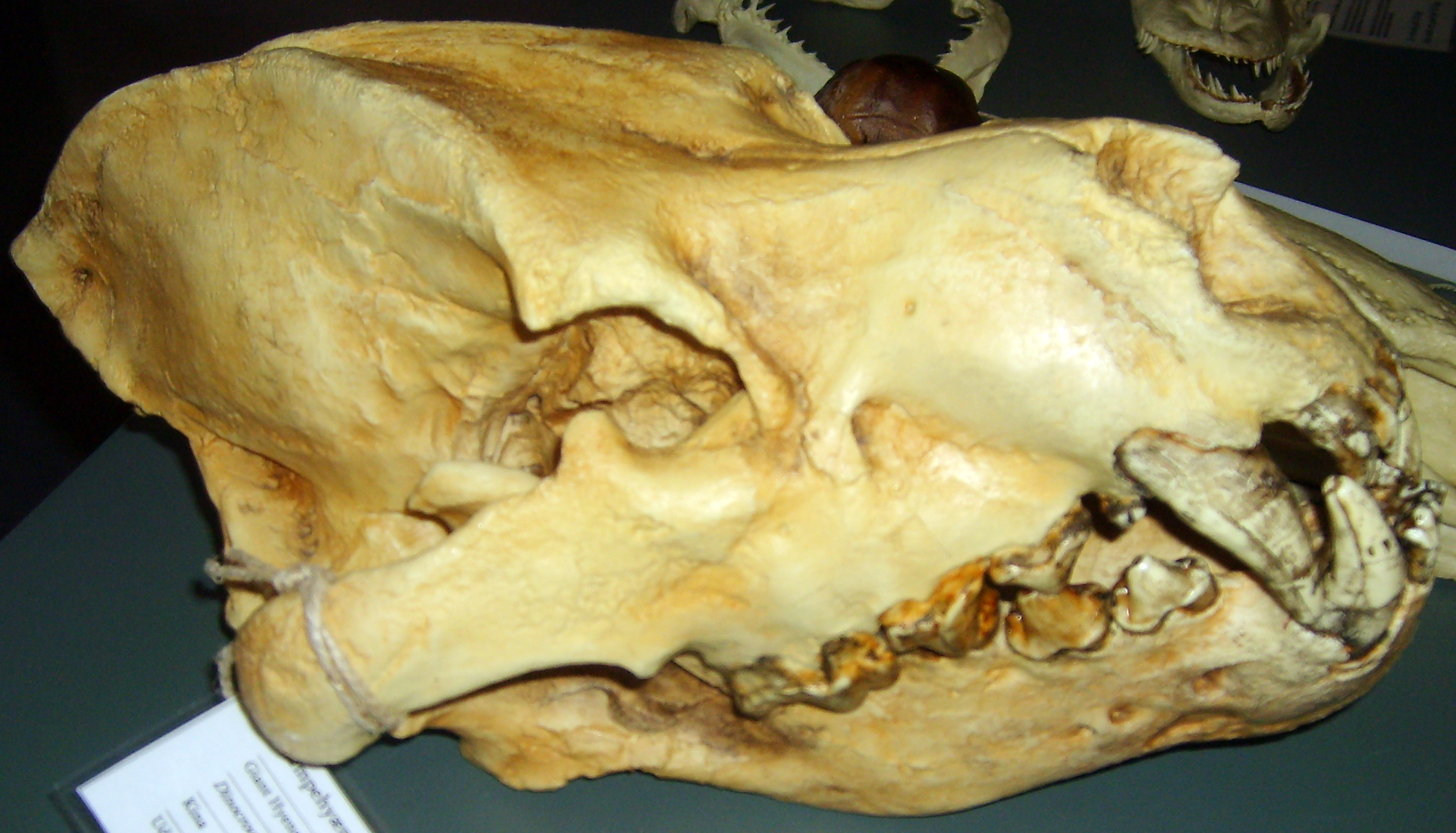
- Dinocrocuta gigantea skull cast, Zoological Museum in Copenhagen

Scientific classification
- Kingdom: Animalia
- Phylum: Chordata
- Class: Mammalia
- Order: Carnivora
- Superfamily: Herpestoidea
- Family: †Percrocutidae; Werdelin & Solounias, 1991

Genera
- †Dinocrocuta; †Percrocuta; †Tongxinictis?

Synonyms
- Percrocutinae (Schmidt-Kittler, 1976)

= Percrocutidae =

Percrocutidae Temporal range: Middle Miocene—Late Miocene, 13.7–6.3 Ma

Extinct family of carnivores

Percrocutidae is an extinct family of hyena-like feliform carnivorans endemic to Asia, Africa, and Southern Europe from the Middle Miocene through Late Miocene, from 13.7 to 6.3 Ma.

The first percrocutids are known from the middle Miocene of Europe and western Asia and belonged to the genus Percrocuta. Percrocuta already had large premolars, but did not carry such a massive bite as the later form Dinocrocuta, from the later Miocene. Originally, these carnivores were placed with the hyenas in the family Hyaenidae. Although they were later placed as a sister-taxa to Hyaenidae. Anatomical analysis by Xiong argued that perocutids were a subfamily of hyenas. This reclassification has been supported by some experts. Sometimes it was placed with the family Stenoplesictidae into the superfamily Stenoplesictoidea.

== Taxonomy and evolution ==
=== Taxonomic history ===
Percrocuta was first considered as a side-branch outside of Hyaenidae by Thenius in 1966. It was later named as a different subfamily, Percrocutinae, of Hyaenidae in 1976, and at that time was proposed to include Percrocuta, Adcrocuta eximia, and Allohyaena kadici. Dinocrocuta was elevated from a subgenus to a full genus in 1988.

The family Percrocutidae was formally elevated in 1991, to include the genera Percrocuta, Dinocrocuta, Belbus and Allohyaena.

Later studies have suggested that Belbus and Allohyaena are true hyaenids and not percrocutids.

=== Classification ===
Family	Image	Genus	Species
†Percrocutidae		†Dinocrocuta (Schmidt-Kittler, 1975)	†D. algeriensis; †D. gigantea; †D. salonicae; †D. senyureki
†Percrocutidae		†Percrocuta (Kretzoi, 1938)	†P. abessalomi; †P. carnifex; †P. grandis; †P. leakeyi; †P. miocenica; †P. tobieni; †P. tungurensis; †P. xixiaensis

The list follows McKenna and Bell's Classification of Mammals for prehistoric genera (1997). In contrast to McKenna and Bell's classification, they are not included as a subfamily into the Hyaenidae but as a separate family Percrocutidae.
