= Metahyaena =

Metahyaena Temporal range: Late Miocene (Vallesian)

Scientific classification
- Domain: Eukaryota
- Kingdom: Animalia
- Phylum: Chordata
- Class: Mammalia
- Order: Carnivora
- Suborder: Feliformia
- Family: Hyaenidae
- Genus: †Metahyaena; Viranta & Werdelin, 2003

Type species
- †Metahyaena confector Viranta & Werdelin, 2003

Extinct genus of mammals

Metahyaena is an extinct genus of hyaenids that lived in Turkey during the Late Miocene. The type and only known species, M. confector, was discovered in the Sinap Formation. Metahyaena shows some primitive durophagous adaptations. The premolars of Metahyaena are narrower than those of other durophagous hyaenids such as Belbus beaumonti.

== Etymology ==
The specific name of M. confector (from Latin: confector, 'maker' or 'destroyer') was chosen due to the significant number of bites found on bones of other species in its type locality.
