= Proteles amplidentus =

Proteles amplidentus Temporal range: Late Pliocene – Early Pleistocene

Scientific classification
- Domain: Eukaryota
- Kingdom: Animalia
- Phylum: Chordata
- Class: Mammalia
- Order: Carnivora
- Suborder: Feliformia
- Family: Hyaenidae
- Genus: Proteles
- Species: †P. amplidentus

Binomial name
- †Proteles amplidentus Werdelin & Solounias, 1991

Synonyms
- Proteles transvaalensis Hendey, 1974

Extinct species of hyena

Proteles amplidentus is an extinct species of prehistoric hyena closely related to the living aardwolf. It lived during the Plio-Pleistocene in South Africa, where fossils have been found in the Swartkrans dated to as recently as 1.5 million years ago. Proteles amplidentus has additionally been found in the Kromdraai fossil site.

== Characteristics ==
Proteles amplidentus was similar to the modern aardwolf in most respects but had less reduced cheek teeth. The former species was larger and had larger canine teeth. It had a smaller third premolar than the aardwolf and its second and third premolars were positioned more anteriorly.

== Etymology and naming ==
Proteles amplidentus was initially named Proteles transvaalensis by Hendey (1974), but Proteles cristatus transvaalensis (Roberts, 1932) had already been used to describe a subspecies of aardwolf. Proteles amplidentus was proposed by Werdelin & Solounias (1991) in reference to the larger dentition of this species in comparison to the extant aardwolf.
