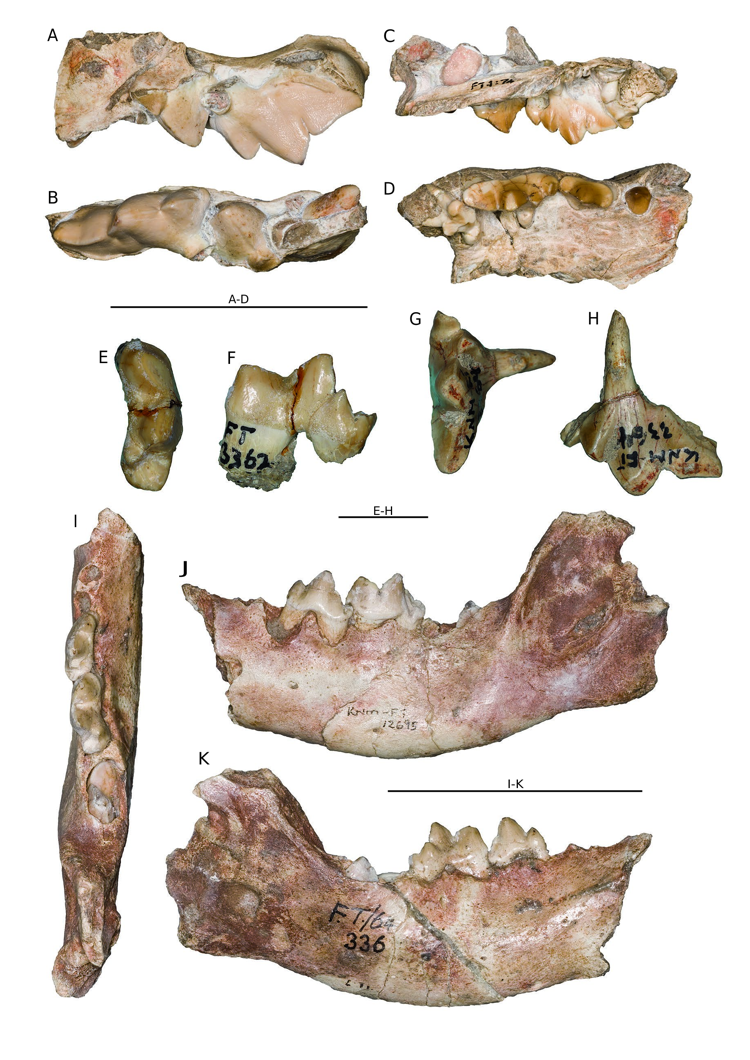
- Jaws and teeth of P. tobieni

Scientific classification
- Kingdom: Animalia
- Phylum: Chordata
- Class: Mammalia
- Order: Carnivora
- Family: Hyaenidae
- Subfamily: †Percrocutinae
- Genus: †Percrocuta; Kretzoi, 1938

Type species
- Percrocuta carnifex Pilgrim, 1913

Species
- †Percrocuta abessalomi Gabunia, 1958; †Percrocuta carnifex Pilgrim, 1913; †Percrocuta grandis Kurtén, 1957; †Percrocuta leakeyi Howell & Petter, 1985; †Percrocuta miocenica Pavolović & Thenius, 1965; †Percrocuta tobieni Crusafont & Aguirre, 1971; †Percrocuta xixiaensis Xiong, 2022; †Percrocuta tungurensis (Colbert, 1939)

Synonyms
- Capsatherium Kurtén, 1978

= Percrocuta =

Percrocuta Temporal range: Middle Miocene–Late Miocene

Extinct genus of carnivores

Percrocuta is an extinct genus of percrocutid hyena. It lived in Eurasia and Africa, during the Miocene epoch.

== Description ==
With a maximum length of 1.50 m (5 ft), Percrocuta was much bigger than its modern relatives. Like the spotted hyena, it had a robust skull and powerful jaws. Similar to modern hyaenids, its hind legs were shorter than the front legs, resulting in a characteristic sloping back. However, not all species were larger than modern hyenas. P. xixiaensis is described to being close to size of the striped hyena. The zygomatic arch of this species was slender a hyena its size suggesting the cranium isn’t as strongly built was other bone crushing hyenas such as Dinocrocuta, Pachycrocuta, striped hyena, Adcrocuta, and Crocuta.

P. miocenia was estimated to have weighed between 30–100 kg (66–220 lb).

== Classification ==
Percrocuta was introduced as a genus of Hyaenidae in 1938. Percrocuta's relation to the family was debated until 1985, when Percrocuta, Dinocrocuta, Belbus, and Allohyaena were accepted as the four genera of Percrocutidae. More recent evidence, however, has shown that Belbus and Allohyaena at least, are not percrocutids.

== Fossil evidence ==
P. abessalomi is known only from a skull, two mandibles, and two teeth. These fossils were all collected from the Belomechetskaja, Russia area and date from the sixth Mammal Neogene (MN) zone. This species is the best known of the family Percrocutidae. P. miocenica is known from only a few mandibles, found in Serbia, Bosnia and Herzegovina and Turkey. These fossils are also dated to MN 6.

== Palaeobiology ==
=== Palaeoecology ===
Because its skull morphology is highly convergent with that of present day osteophagous hyaenids, Percrocuta was likely durophagous as well.
