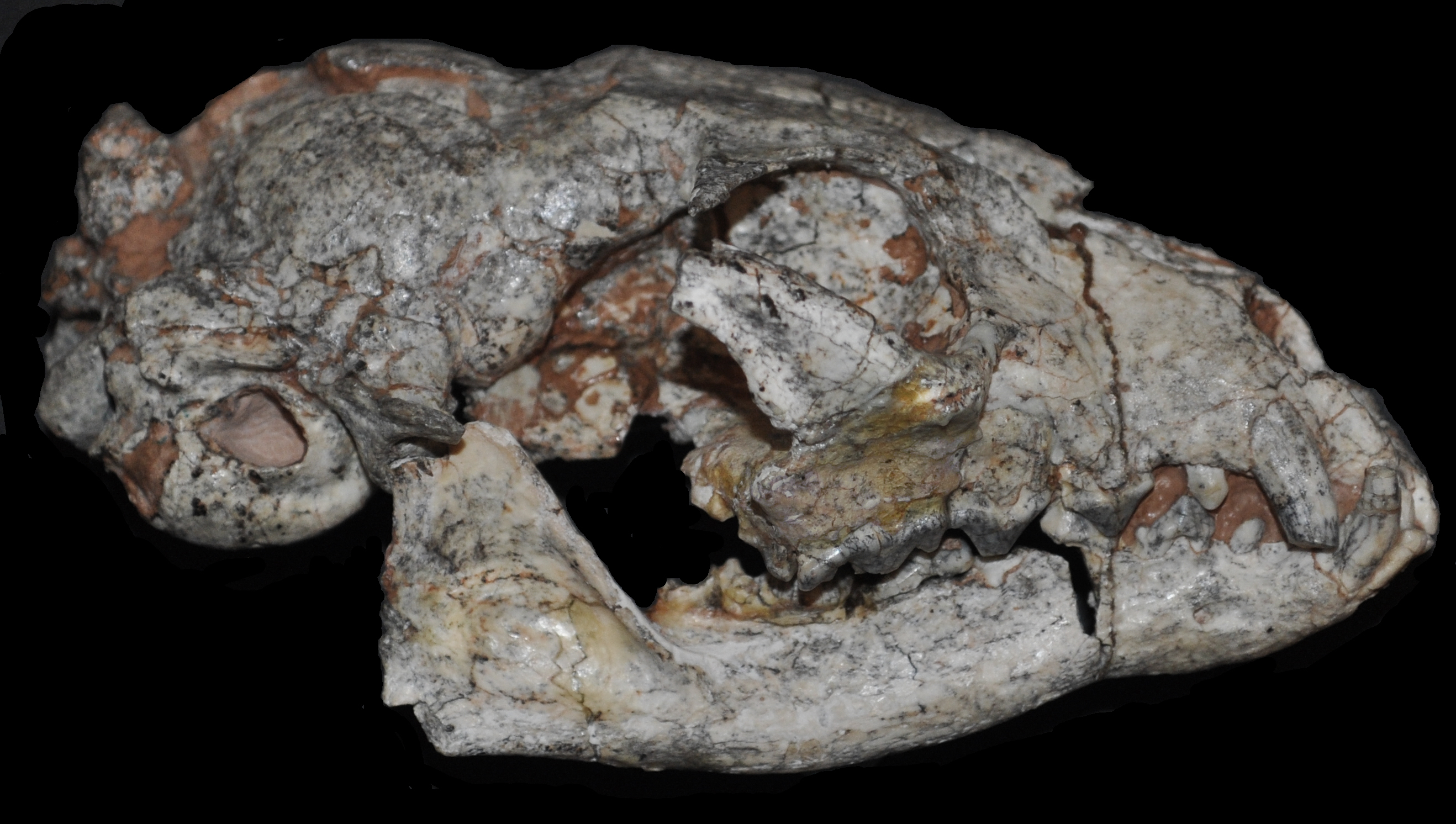
- Gansuyaena megalotis holotype skull

Scientific classification
- Kingdom: Animalia
- Phylum: Chordata
- Class: Mammalia
- Infraclass: Placentalia
- Order: Carnivora
- Family: Hyaenidae
- Subfamily: Protelinae
- Genus: †Gansuyaena; Galiano et al., 2021

Type species
- †Gansuyaena megalotis Galiano et al., 2021

Other species
- †G. guerini Galiano et al., 2021

= Gansuyaena =

Gansuyaena Temporal range: Middle Miocene to Late Miocene

Extinct genus of mammals

Gansuyaena is an extinct genus of small hyenas that lived through the Middle to Late Miocene. Among all known fossil hyaenids Gansuyaena was the most closely related to the extant Proteles genus which contains the aardwolf, but Gansuyaena was not a likely ancestor of Proteles. Gansuyaena may have been a dietary generalist. It likely had sharp hearing and vision. Gansuyaena megalotis possibly had insectivorous adaptations, including adaptations to termite-eating.

== Species ==
There are currently two species recognized in the Gansuyaena genus.

=== Gansuyaena megalotis ===
The type species. Gansuyaena megalotis is known by fossils from the Linxia Basin in the Gansu Province of China and specimens from Pasalar, Turkey. This species lived from the Middle to Late Miocene. In proportion to its size, Gansuyaena megalotis had a larger talonid on its first molar than Gansuyaena guerini.

=== Gansuyaena guerini ===
Gansuyaena guerini has only been found in Los Mansuetos in Spain. It lived during the Turolian of the Late Miocene. Gansuyaena guerini was larger than Gansuyaena megalotis and had larger premolars.

== Characteristics ==
Gansuyaena displayed similar morphological features to the aardwolf but lacked the reduced dentition of the aardwolf. Gansuyaena megalotis had a wide palate, similar to that of the aardwolf, suggesting that it may have had an enlarged tongue that enabled it to prey on termites like its modern relative. Like the aardwolf, Gansuyaena megalotis had greater spaces between its teeth than other hyaenids, indicating that the species may have adapted to eat less meat than its more carnivorous ancestors.

Distinct traits of Gansuyaena in comparison to other hyaenids include a wider infraorbital foramen, a larger auditory bulla and external auditory meatus, and a very large ectotympanic and crista tympanica.

== Etymology ==
Gansuyaena (Galiano et al., 2021), meaning Gansu hyena, refers to the Gansu Province in China where the type specimen of Gansuyaena megalotis was discovered.

The specific name megalotis (Galiano et al., 2021) originates from the Greek words Mega (large) and Ōtós (ear). This name refers to the enlarged auditory bullae of Gansuyaena megalotis.
