= Ikelohyaena =

Ikelohyaena Temporal range: Pliocene (Ruscinian) ~5.2 Ma

Scientific classification
- Kingdom: Animalia
- Phylum: Chordata
- Class: Mammalia
- Order: Carnivora
- Family: Hyaenidae
- Genus: †Ikelohyaena; Werdelin & Solounias, 1991

Type species
- †Ikelohyaena abronia Hendey, 1974a

Synonyms
- Species synonymy: I. abronia: Hyaena abronia Hendey, 1974a; Hyaenictis preforfex Hendey, 1974a; Ictitherium preforfex (Hendey, 1974a) Hendey, 1978; Hyaenidae incertae sedis Barry, ?1987

Extinct genus of mammals

Ikelohyaena (from Greek: ἴκελος íkelos, 'like' and Latin: hyaena, 'hyena') is an extinct genus of hyaenids that lived in Southern and Eastern Africa during the Pliocene. I. abronia, the type and only known species, has been found in Lothagam, Langebaanweg, and possibly Laetoli. I. abronia was dated to approximately 5.2 million years ago.

Ikelohyaena is regarded by some authors as a possible but highly skeptical common ancestor of the modern striped hyenas and brown hyenas or as an early species of the lineage that lead to the striped hyena.

== Characteristics ==
I. abronia was smaller than a striped hyena. It had thinner forelimbs and longer hindlimbs than modern durophagous hyaenids, indicating that it may have had a more canid-like locomotion and stance. The M2 and m2 molars are retained in I. abronia rather than absent as in all extant hyaenids.

== Etymology ==
The generic name Ikelohyaena was chosen due to the morphological similarities between Ikelohyaena and the extant Hyaena hyaena.

== Palaeobiology ==
=== Palaeoecology ===
Finite element analysis indicates that the skull of Ikelohyaena abronia possessed some of the derived features of modern osteophagous hyaenids for stress dissipation, but also shows that the species had a considerably lower bite force than its extant durophagous relatives. Ikelohyaena had durophagous adaptations in its dentition but was less well-adapted to durophagy than modern durophagous hyaenids such as the striped hyena. Dental microwear analysis indicates that I. abronia consumed bone less frequently than modern durophagous hyaenids.
