= Belbus =

Belbus Temporal range: Late Miocene (Turolian)

Scientific classification
- Kingdom: Animalia
- Phylum: Chordata
- Class: Mammalia
- Infraclass: Placentalia
- Order: Carnivora
- Family: Hyaenidae
- Genus: †Belbus; Werdelin & Solounias, 1991

Type species
- †Belbus beaumonti Qiu, 1987

Other species
- †B. djurabensis Bonis et al., 2010

Synonyms
- Species synonymy: B. beaumonti: Hyaena sp. De Beaumont, 1968; Hyaena dubia (Zdansky, 1924) De Beaumont, 1969a; Hyaenictitherium cf. hyaenoides (Zdansky, 1924) Howell & Petter, 1980; Thalassictis hyaenoides (Zdansky, 1924) Solounias, 1981; Lycyaena chaeretis (Gaudry, 1861) Solounias, 1981; Thalassictis (Hyaenictitherium) hyaenoides (Zdansky, 1924) Solounias & De Beaumont, 1981; Pachycrocuta sp. Solounias & De Beaumont, 1981; Hyaenictis beaumonti Qiu, 1987; cf. Palinhyaena sp. Werdelin, 1988b

Extinct genus of mammals

Belbus (from Late Latin: belbus, 'hyena') is an extinct genus of hyaenids that lived in Europe and Africa during the Turolian of the Late Miocene. Belbus had durophagous adaptations in its dentition, but was less well-adapted to durophagy than modern durophagous hyaenids such as the spotted hyena or the brown hyena.

== Species ==
=== Belbus beaumonti ===
The type species, B. beaumonti, has been found in Samos and Pikermi, both in Greece, and in Çobanpinar, Turkey. Juvenile specimens of B. beaumonti are similar in size to modern adult striped hyenas, and adults may have been larger. The weight of B. beaumonti has been roughly estimated at around 40 kilograms (88 pounds).

=== Belbus djurabensis ===
B. djurabensis was discovered in Toros-Menalla in the Djurab desert of Chad. It is smaller than B. beaumonti. B. djurabensis has a smaller talonid on its m1 molar and a smaller M1 relative to the size of its P4 premolar than the type species. The premolars of B. djurabensis, especially the p3, are larger than those of B. beaumonti. The specific name of B. djurabensis is derived from the name of the Djurab desert.
