= Qalıncaq =

- Municipality
- Location within Azerbaijan
- Coordinates: 40°49′17″N 48°05′37″E
- Country: Azerbaijan
- Rayon: Ismailli

Population
  - Total: 1,691
- Time zone: UTC+4 (AZT)
  - Summer (DST): UTC+5 (AZT)

Qalıncaq (also, Kalynchakh, Kalyndzha, and Kalyndzhak) is a village and municipality in the Ismailli Rayon of Azerbaijan. It has a population of 1,691.
