= Protoryx =

Protoryx Temporal range: Middle Miocene to Late Miocene
- Fossil skull, Shanghai Natural History Museum

Scientific classification
- Kingdom: Animalia
- Phylum: Chordata
- Class: Mammalia
- Order: Artiodactyla
- Family: Bovidae
- Subfamily: Caprinae
- Genus: †Protoryx; Forsyth Major, 1891

Extinct genus of mammals

Protoryx is an extinct genus of goat-antelope. The species P. tuvaensis was described by E. L. Dmitrieva and N. V. Serdyuk in 2011, from Russia.
