= Allohyaena =

Allohyaena Temporal range: Late Miocene (Tortonian)

Scientific classification
- Kingdom: Animalia
- Phylum: Chordata
- Class: Mammalia
- Order: Carnivora
- Family: Hyaenidae
- Genus: †Allohyaena; Kretzoi, 1938

Type species
- †Allohyaena kadici Kretzoi, 1938

Other species
- †A. sarmatica Semenov, 1994; †A. minor (Ozansoy, 1965)

Synonyms
- Dinocrocuta minor Ozansoy, 1965

Extinct genus of carnivores

Allohyaena is an extinct genus of hyaenids that lived in Europe and Turkey during the Late Miocene. Like most modern hyaenids, Allohyaena had durophagous adaptations to support the consumption of bones.

== Taxonomy ==
Allohyaena was erected by Kretzoi in 1938, with A. kadici as the type species. Dinocrocuta minor from Turkey was described by Ozansoy in 1965 and later reassigned to Allohyaena as A. minor. A. sarmatica was described by Semenov in 1994.
