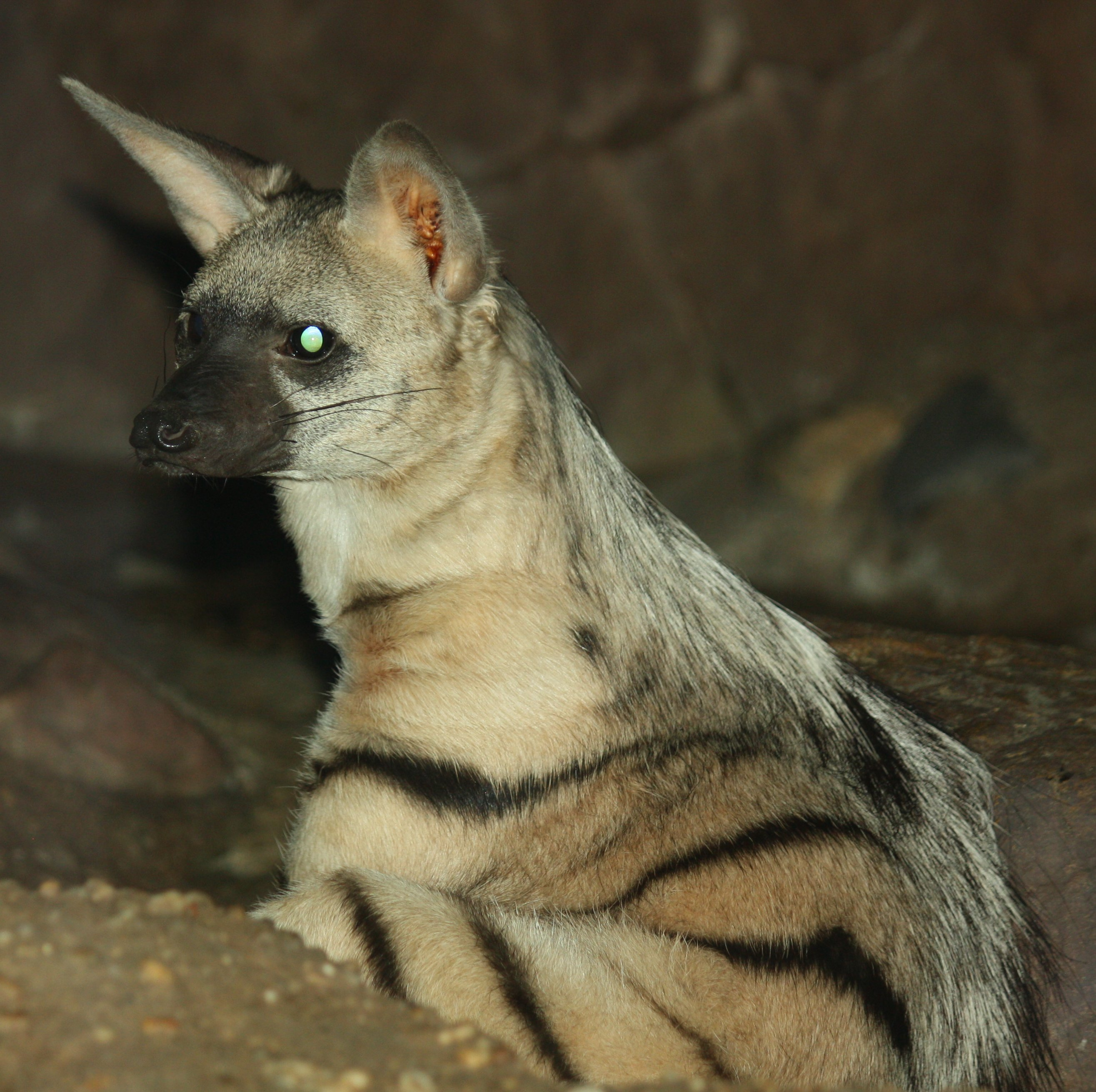
- Aardwolf (Proteles cristatus)

Scientific classification
- Kingdom: Animalia
- Phylum: Chordata
- Class: Mammalia
- Order: Carnivora
- Family: Hyaenidae
- Subfamily: Protelinae; Saint-Hilaire, 1851
- Genus: Proteles; Saint-Hilaire, 1824

Type species
- Viverra cristata Sparrman, 1783

Species
- Proteles cristata; Proteles septentrionalis; †Proteles amplidentus

= Proteles =

Proteles Temporal range: Late Pliocene – Recent (Possible Miocene record)

Genus of mammal

Proteles is a genus of distinctive hyenas which contain the aardwolf (Proteles cristatus) and its close fossil relatives. It is the only extant genus of the subfamily Protelinae.

While the oldest fossils definitely belonging to Proteles date back to the Pliocene, material from the Miocene dating to around 10 million years ago has been suggested to belong to the genus, which would significantly increase its temporal range.

It has been suggested that the Proelinae subfamily may actually be an offshoot of the "running hyenas" (such as Lycyaena) who adapted to an insectivorous diet due to increased competition from canines and felines.
