= Herpestides =

Herpestides Temporal range: Early Miocene

Scientific classification
- Kingdom: Animalia
- Phylum: Chordata
- Class: Mammalia
- Infraclass: Placentalia
- Order: Carnivora
- Infraorder: Aeluroidea
- Genus: †Herpestides de Beaumont, 1967

Species
- H. aegypticus; H. aequatorialis; H. antiquus; H. compactus

Extinct genus of carnivores

Herpestides is an extinct genus of terrestrial carnivore that was endemic to North Africa and Southern Europe during the Early Miocene subepoch (22.4—20 mya) and existed for approximately 2.4 million years.

== Taxonomy ==
Herpestides is considered to belong to the Aeluroidea group of cat-like carnivores and, in particular, to the Viverridae.

Four species are recognised:

- H. aegypticus
- H. aequatorialis
- H. antiquus
- H. compactus
