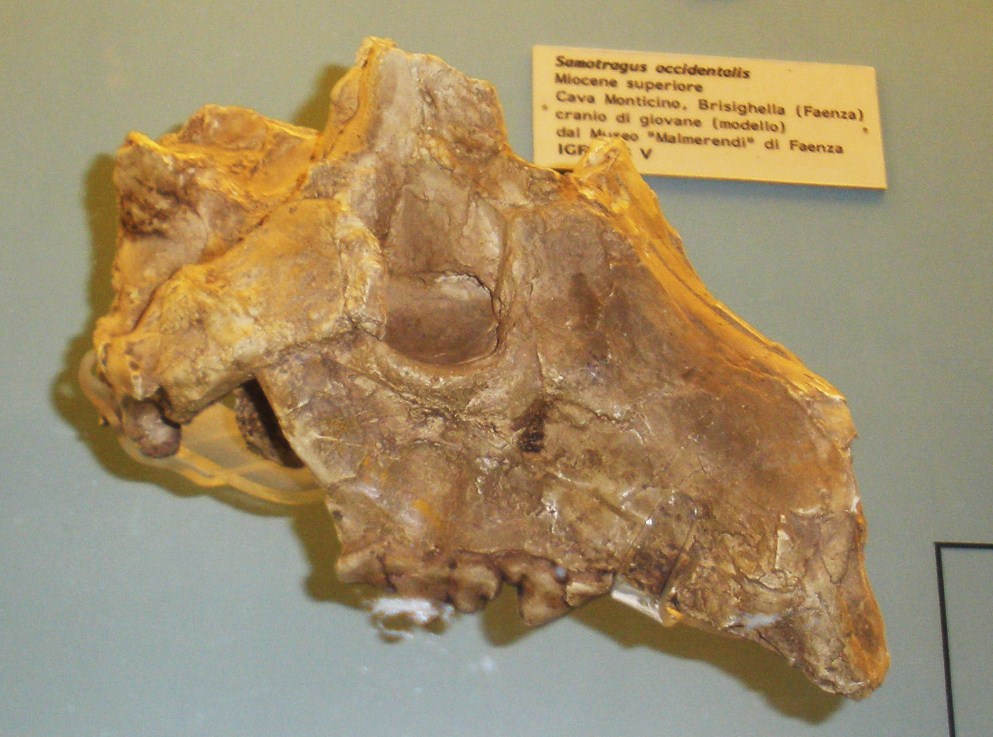
- Skull of Lycyaena

Scientific classification
- Kingdom: Animalia
- Phylum: Chordata
- Class: Mammalia
- Order: Carnivora
- Family: Hyaenidae
- Genus: †Lycyaena; Hensel, 1863

Type species
- †Lycyaena dubia Zdansky, 1924

Other species
- †L. chaeretis Gaudry, 1861; †L. macrostoma Lydekker, 1884; †L. crusafonti Kurtén, 1976

Synonyms
- Species synonymy: L. dubia: ?Lycyaena dubia Zdansky, 1924; Thalassictis (Lycyaena) Solounias & De Beaumont, 1981; Thalassictis (Lycyaena) dubia Qiu, 1985; L. chaeretis: Hyaena chaeretis Gaudry, 1861; Thalassictis chaeretis Solounias, 1981; Thalassictis (Lycyaena) chaeretis Solounias & De Beaumont, 1981; Thalassictis (Lycyaena) Solounias & De Beaumont, 1981; L. macrostoma: Hyaena macrostoma Lydekker, 1884; Lycyaena ?macrostoma Kretzoi, 1938; Thalassictis macrostoma De Vos, Leinders & Hussain, 1987; L. crusafonti: Lycyaena chaeretis Solounias, 1981

= Lycyaena =

Lycyaena Temporal range: Late Miocene (Vallesian to Turolian)

Extinct genus of carnivores

Lycyaena (‘wolf hyena’) is an extinct genus of terrestrial carnivore in the family Hyaenidae. It has been suggested by R. F. Ewer that Lycyaena may be a possible ancestor to today's aardwolf (Proteles cristatus). Lycyaena lived in Eurasia and North Africa during the Late Miocene.

== Palaeobiology ==
=== Palaeoecology ===
Lycyaena was a cursorial hunting hyaena as opposed to full-time scavenger. Paired δ^{13}C and δ^{18}O analysis of Lycyaena chaeretis from the site of Cerro de los Batallones indicates that it partitioned resources with other carnivorans in its palaeoenvironment by hunting prey in more open environments compared to other predators known to have inhabited the same ecosystem.
