= Hyaenictis =

Hyaenictis Temporal range: Late Miocene–Early Pleistocene

Scientific classification
- Kingdom: Animalia
- Phylum: Chordata
- Class: Mammalia
- Infraclass: Placentalia
- Order: Carnivora
- Family: Hyaenidae
- Subfamily: Hyaeninae
- Genus: †Hyaenictis; Gaudry, 1861

Type species
- Hyaenictis graeca Gaudry, 1861

Other species
- Hyaenictis almerai Villalta and Crusafont, 1945 Hyaenictis preforfex Hendey, 1974 Hyaenictis hendeyi Werdelin, 1994

Extinct genus of hyaenid

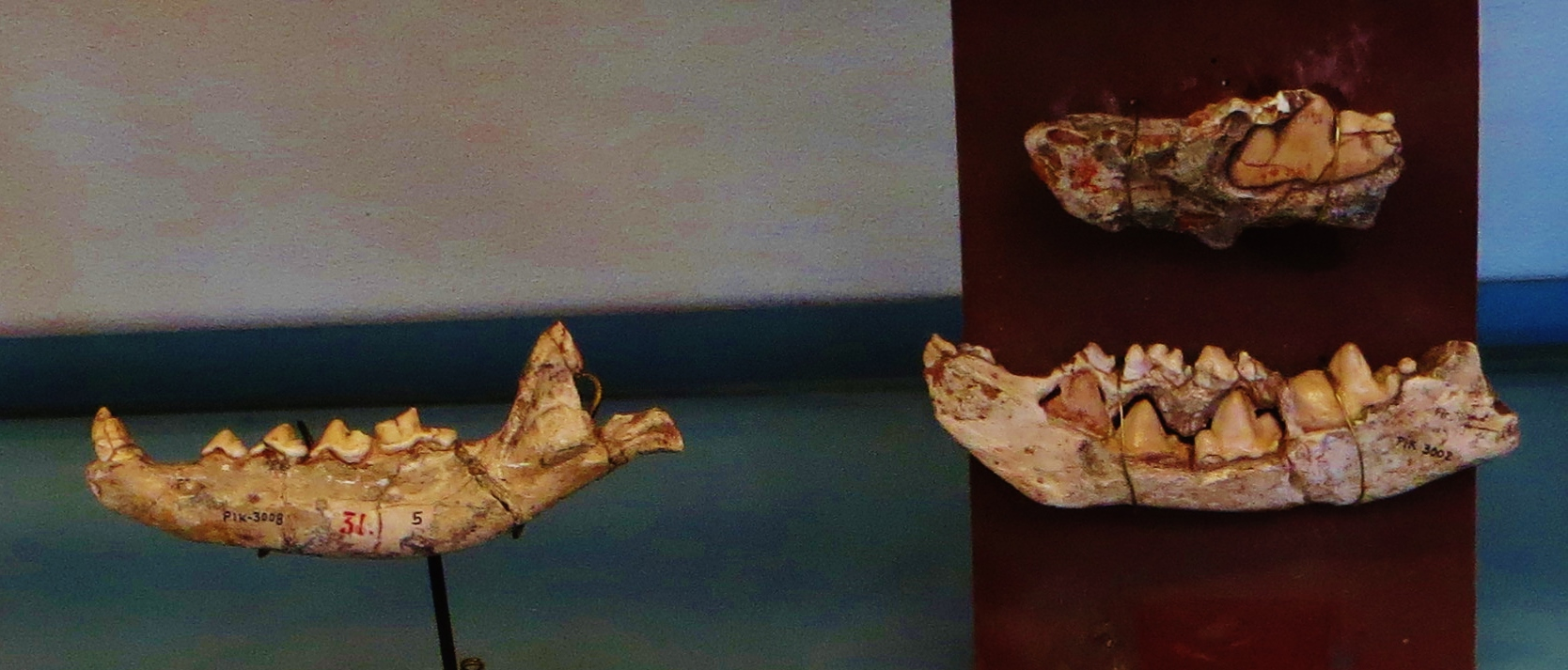
Fossil jaw of Hyaenictis graeca, the type species for the extinct genus Hyaenictis, at Musee d'Histoire Naturelle, Paris.

Hyaenictis is an extinct genus of hyaenid feliform that lived in Africa and Europe during the Neogene and Quaternary periods.

== Description ==
The enamel of Hyaenictis aff. almerai cheek teeth displays a zigzag Hunter-Schreger band (HSB) pattern in the middle portion of the crown, but closer to the cervix, the HSBs are acute angled and undulating.
