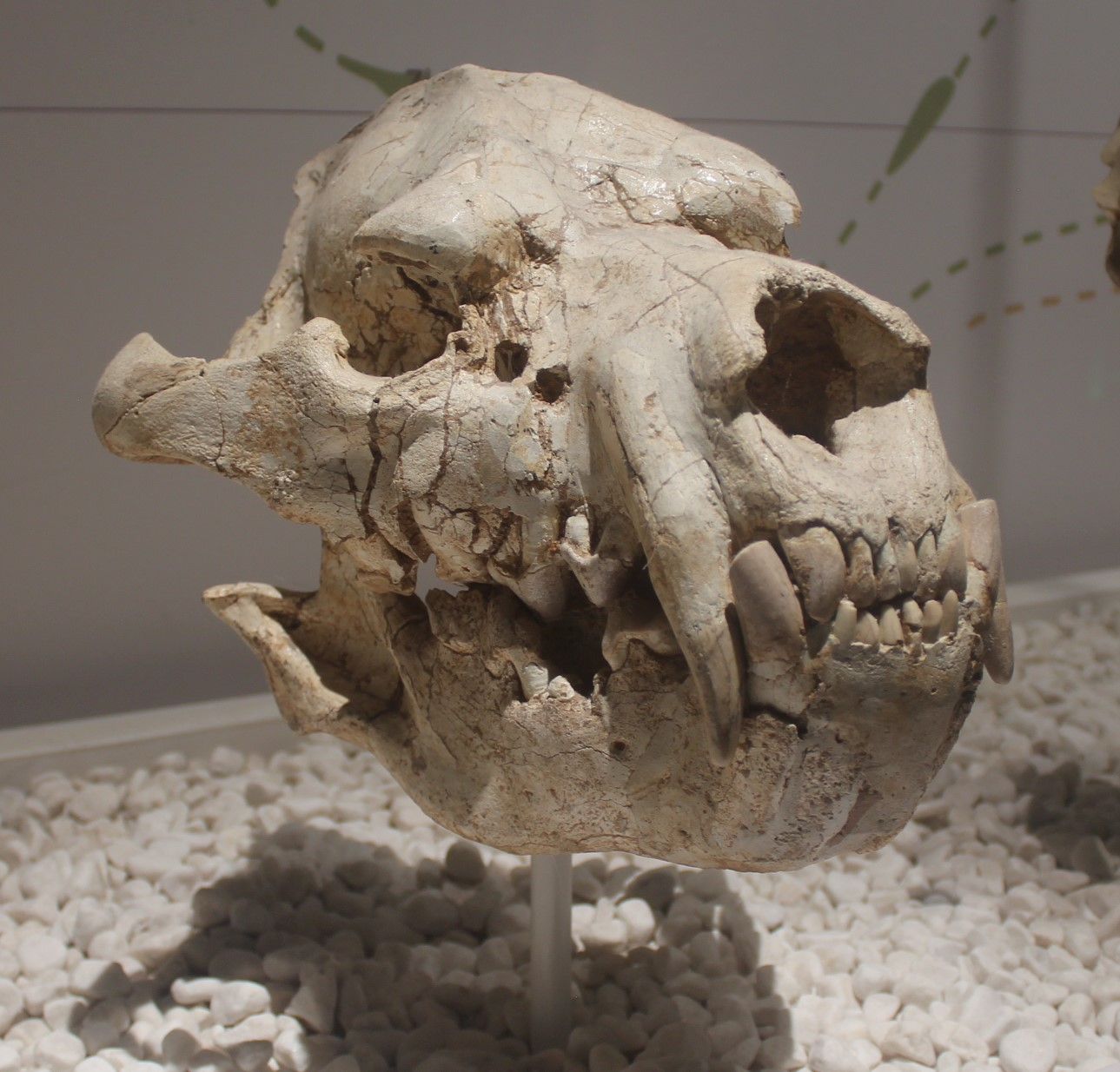
- D. gigantea skull, National Natural History Museum of China

Scientific classification
- Kingdom: Animalia
- Phylum: Chordata
- Class: Mammalia
- Order: Carnivora
- Family: Hyaenidae
- Subfamily: †Percrocutinae
- Genus: †Dinocrocuta; Schmidt-Kittler, 1976

Species
- †D. algeriensis Arambourg, 1959; †D. gigantea Schlosser, 1903; †D. salonicae Andrews, 1918; †D. senyureki Ozansoy, 1957; †D. yingliangi Jiangzuo, 2026

= Dinocrocuta =

Dinocrocuta Temporal range: Middle—Late Miocene (Serravallian to Messinian), 13.7–7 Ma

Extinct genus of carnivores

Dinocrocuta is an extinct genus of large carnivore, either considered a true hyena or a member of the closely related extinct family Percrocutidae. It lived in Eurasia and Africa from the Middle to Late Miocene epoch, ranging from 13.7 to 7 Ma. It had very strong jaws that were able to crush bones. It considerably exceeded the size of living hyenas.

== Taxonomy ==
Dinocrocuta gigantea was originally erected as the species Hyaena gigantea by Schlosser in 1903 based on fragmentary remains found in drug stores in China, and subsequently was referred to under a number of different subgenus and genus names. In 1959, the species Hyaena algeriensis was erected by Camille Arambourg from remains found in North Africa. Schmidt-Kittler, 1976 created Dinocrocuta as a subgenus of Percrocuta, placing "H." algeriensis as its type species. Qiu et al. in 1988 raised Dinocrocuta to being a genus in its own right.

Dinocrocuta is usually placed as part of the extinct family Percrocutidae, an extinct family of carnivorans considered to be closely related to true hyenas, but which evolved their similarities to hyenas as part of parallel convergent evolution. However some authors have proposed that percrocutids were instead true hyenas. This is further supported by basicranial anatomy which resembles that of Hyaenidae. Cladogram by Jiangzuo et al. (2026) recovered percrocutids as an early diverging lineage of hyenas.

== Description ==
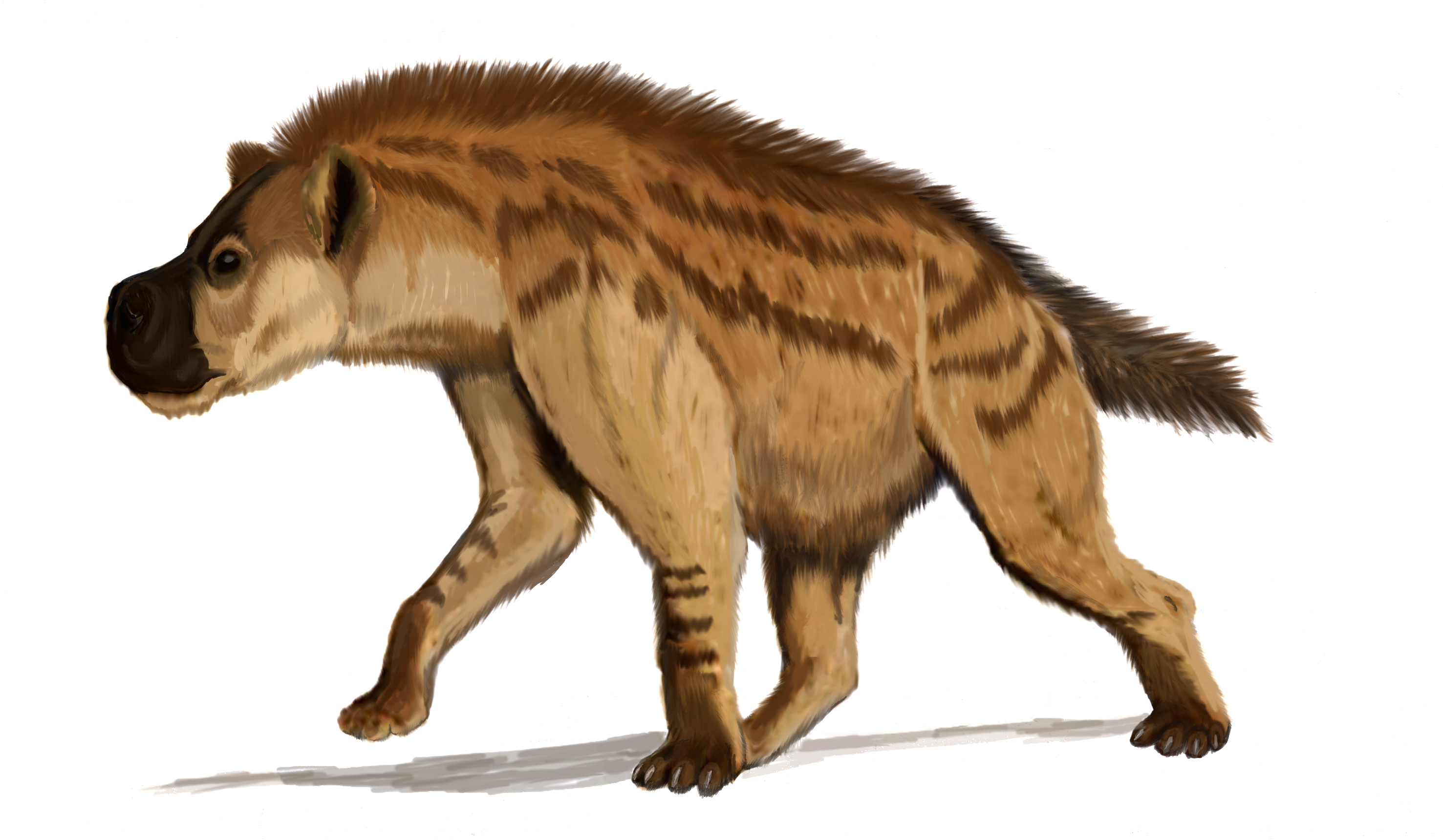
Life restoration of D. gigantea

The largest species, D. gigantea, is known to have reached a shoulder height of 1 m (3.3 ft), and a total skull length of about 40 cm (16 in). In terms of weight, it was originally stated to have weighed up to 380 kg (840 lb). However, a later study estimated its body mass around 200 kg (440 lb) for specimen with skull length of 32.2 cm (12.7 in). Despite this lower estimate, D. gigantea would still be larger than the hyaenini hyena Pachycroctua brevirostris, which is estimated to have may have reached 150 kilograms (330 lb), for the large individuals. The other species were smaller, but still quite large compared to hyena species alive today.

The skull of D. gigantea is proportionally larger relative to body size in comparison to living hyenas. The skull is strongly arched in the forehead region. The skull D. gigantea has massive teeth, with the premolar teeth showing adaptations to crushing.

== Distribution and chronology ==
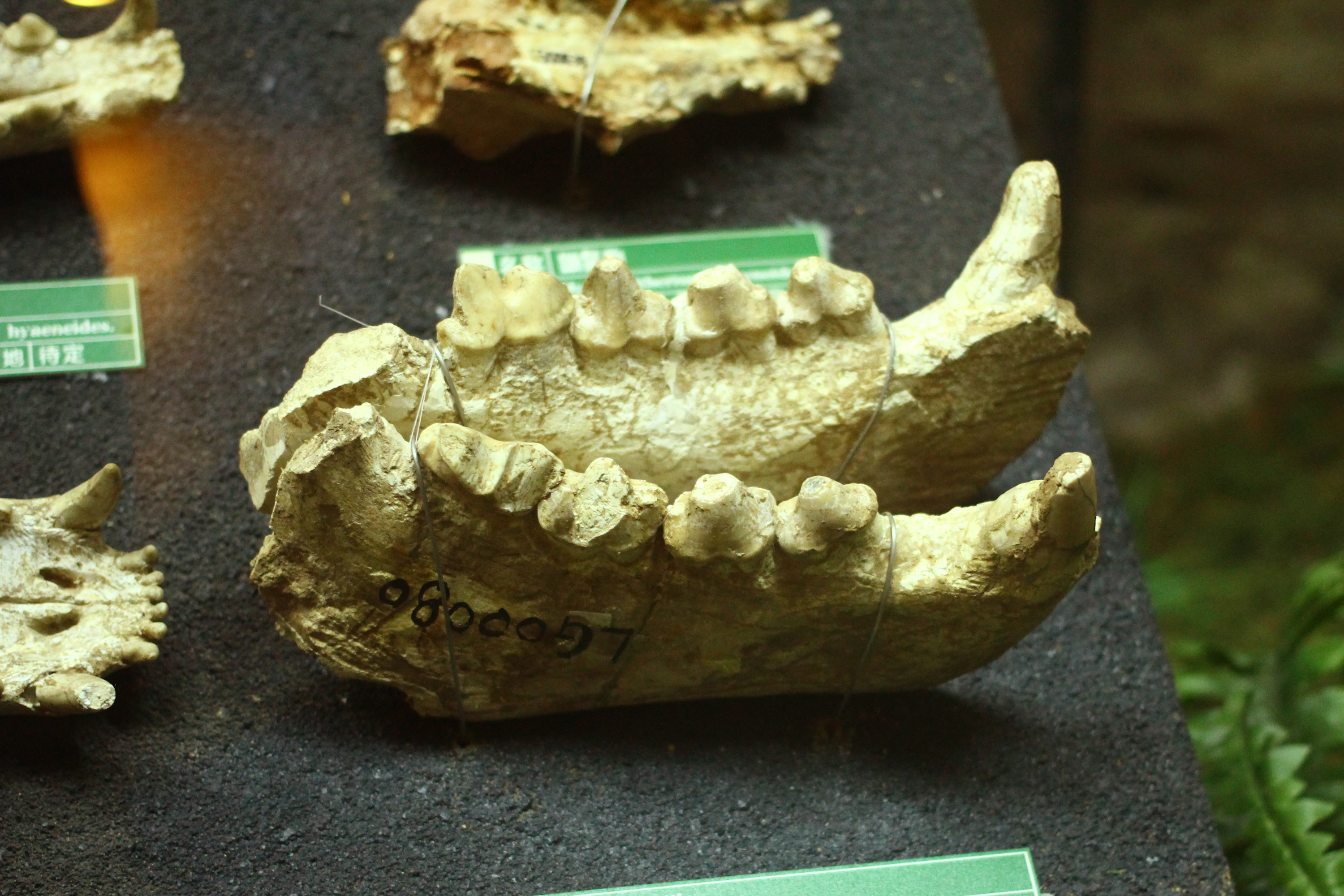
Lower jaw of D. gigantea from China

Dinocrocuta had a large range and ruled most of the Eurasia and some parts of Africa. D. gigantea ranged from Central China to Spain, and encompassed areas in between, like China, Mongolia, India, Pakistan, Iran, Azerbaijan, Turkey, Bulgaria, and Greece. D. algeriensis managed to make its way to North Africa, and D. senyureki originated in the Tibet region.

In the Hezheng basin of China, Dinocrocuta was the dominant carnivore during the early Late Miocene, from around 11 to 7 million years ago. Following its extinction, it was replaced by the smaller hyena Adcrocuta and Amphimachairodus becomes more abundant in the fossil record, possibly showing its dominance within its habitat.

== Palaeoecology ==
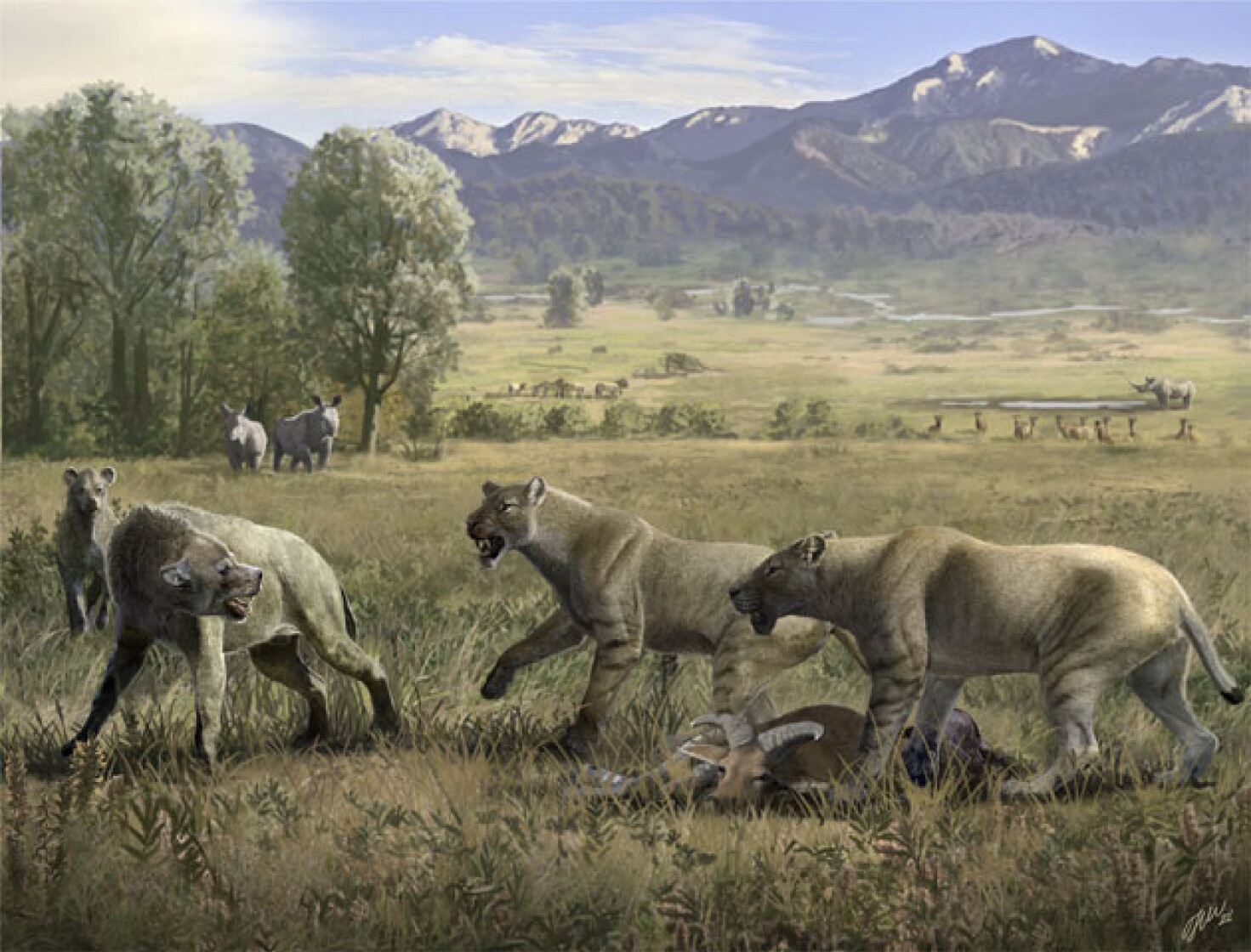
Dinocrocuta confronting the sabertooth cat Amphimachairodus over a Hezhengia carcass

=== Predatory behavior ===
Dinocrocuta was an exceptionally powerful predator and scavenger, capable of preying on animals much larger than itself, such as giraffid, rhinoceros, and occasionally proboscideans. Though it is currently unknown if Dinocrocuta was solitary or gregarious, it was probably a hunter of herbivores such as the tusked rhinoceros Chilotherium. Chilotherium, despite its great size, was vulnerable to the giant feliform, particularly when a pregnant female was giving birth, or was injured or sick. A skull and jaw from a female Chilotherium bears the distinctive bite marks on the forehead from a Dinocrocuta's teeth, indicating that the rhino was part of the carnivore's diet. The regrowth of bone on the rhino's injuries also indicate that the Dinocrocuta's attempt at predation failed and that the rhinoceros fought off her attacker, managing to escape and heal. Like living spotted hyenas, Dinocrocuta is thought to have been a bonecracker using its teeth in combination with its powerful jaws, though the teeth also show adaptations to cutting flesh.

=== Environment ===
Within the Dashengou Fauna, D. gigantea coexisted with a number of large carnivorans such as machairodonts Amphimachairodous hezhengensis and Machairodus aphanistus, the barbourofelin Albanosmilus, and two unnamed agriotheriini bears, with additional carnivorans including mustelids, skunks, and hyenas including Adcrocuta eximia. It is believed to have been a major competitor of Amphimachairodous and likely practiced kleptoparasitism with machairodonts present. Among the carnivorans present within this fauna, Dinocrocuta was by far the most abundant. Herbivores within this fauna include rhinoceros such as Acerorhinus hezhengensis, Chilotherium wimani, and Iranotherium morgani, suid Chleuastochoerus stehlini, cervid Dicrocerus, bovid Miotragocerus, giraffids Honanotheriumschlosseri and Samotherium, and "tetralophodont gomphothere" Tetralophodon exoletus, some of which would've been probable prey for Dinocrocuta.
