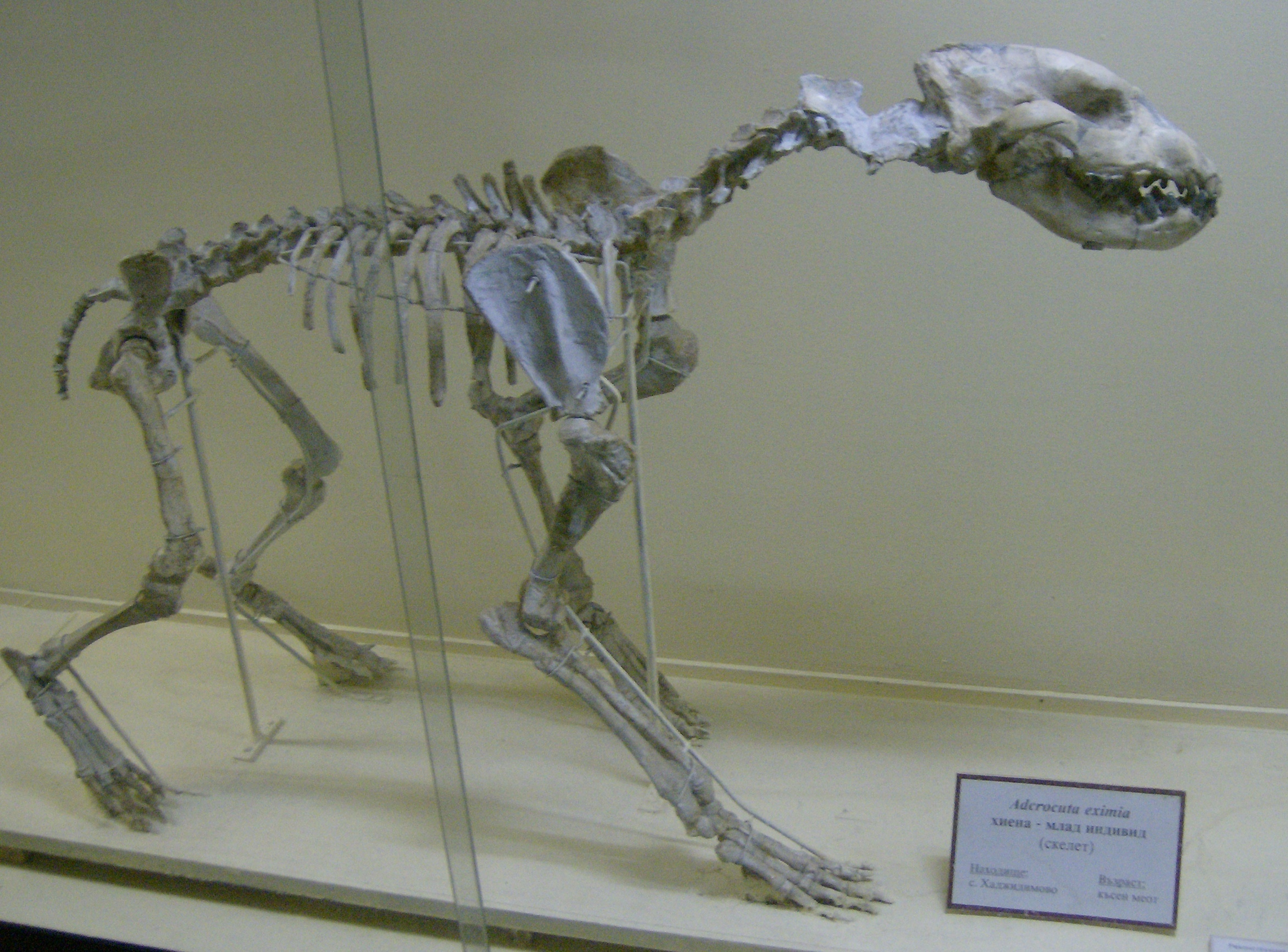
- Skeleton

Scientific classification
- Kingdom: Animalia
- Phylum: Chordata
- Class: Mammalia
- Order: Carnivora
- Family: Hyaenidae
- Subfamily: Hyaeninae
- Genus: †Adcrocuta; Kretzoi, 1938

Species
- A. eximia

= Adcrocuta =

Adcrocuta Temporal range: late Miocene

Extinct genus of carnivores

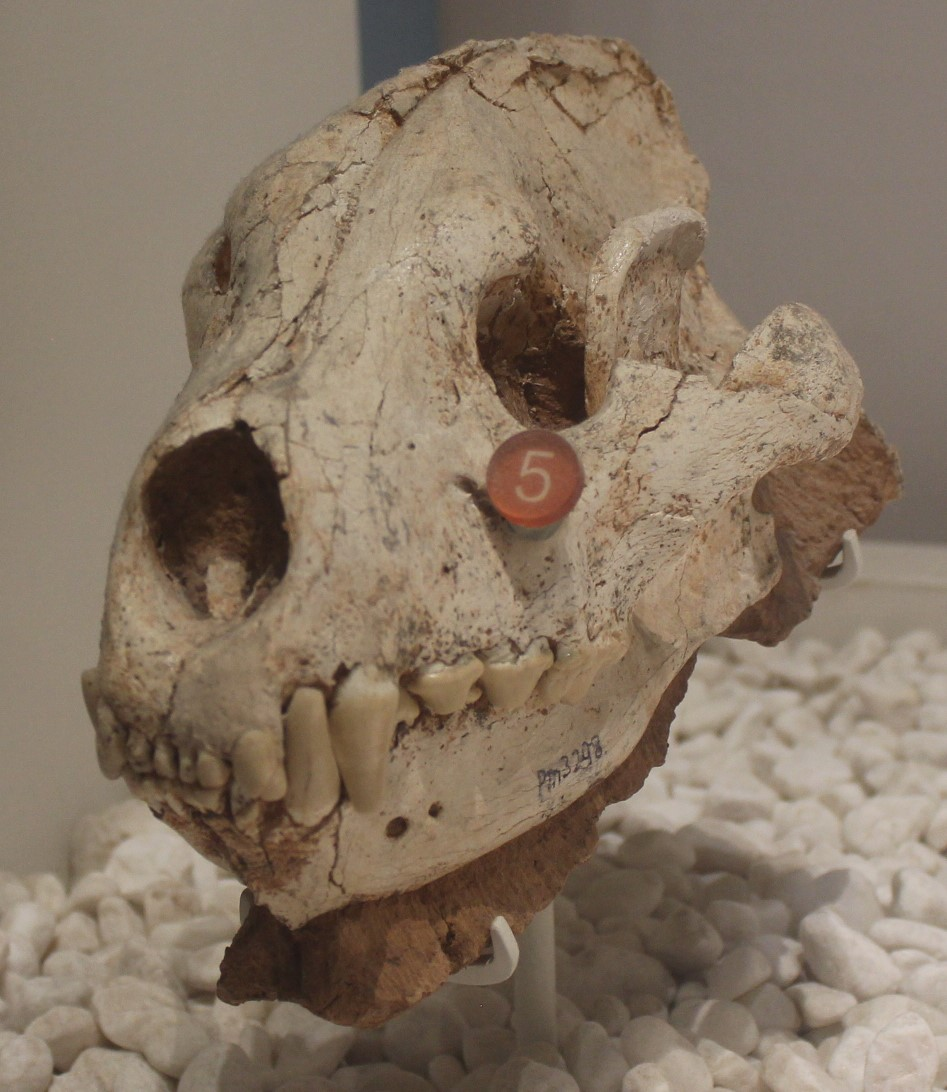
A. eximia skull, National Natural History Museum of China

Adcrocuta is an extinct genus of large hyena that lived in Africa and Eurasia during the Miocene epoch.

== Distribution and chronology ==
Fossils of A. eximia are known from across Eurasia during the Vallesian-Turolian age of the Late Miocene (around 9.6-4.9 million years ago), spanning from Europe, including Spain, North Macedonia, France, Romania, Greece, Hungary, Germany, Austria, Ukraine, and Bulgaria, and Asia including Turkey, Kyrgyzstan, Kazakhstan, Iran, China, Tajikistan, Afghanistan, and Pakistan.

== Description ==
Adcrocuta was comparable in size to a living spotted hyena, with a body mass of around 30–100 kilograms (66–220 lb). Its tooth enamel displays highly zigzag Hunter-Schreger bands (HSBs) in its permanent incisors, canines, and premolars, with its permanent first molar having fewer zigzag HSBs. Its deciduous teeth, with the exception of the deciduous first premolar, also had zigzag HSBs.

== Palaeoecology ==
Like the modern day spotted hyena, A. eximia was an obligate carnivore. The teeth display adaptations to bone cracking, making it one of the earliest hyenas to display evidence of being adapted to this activity, though the shape of the upper carnassial tooth suggests that flesh also probably formed a considerable part of its diet. Its body was powerfully built. Some authors have suggested that it was likely not a fast runner, and that it was primarily a scavenger though this has been disputed by other authors, who note its limb bones are no more robust than those of living spotted hyenas. Its considerable size, which made it by a large margin the largest hyena in late Miocene Eurasia, likely made it effective both in kleptoparasitism (stealing kills from other carnivores), as well as predating on medium-large sized prey. Based on the morphology of its brain cavity, it probably had a less sophisticated social system than modern bone-cracking spotted hyenas. Although, some experts argue it was a social predator much spotted hyenas due to their high abundance. The presence of A. eximia has been interpreted as a zoological indicator of open environments, as the species is believed to have had a preference for open grasslands.
