= Turolian =

The Turolian age is a period of geologic time (9.0–5.3 Ma) within the Miocene used more specifically with European Land Mammal Ages. It precedes the Ruscinian age and follows the Vallesian age. The Turolian overlaps the Tortonian and Messinian ages.
