= Toros-Menalla =

Fossil site in Chad

- Stratigraphic range: Messinian
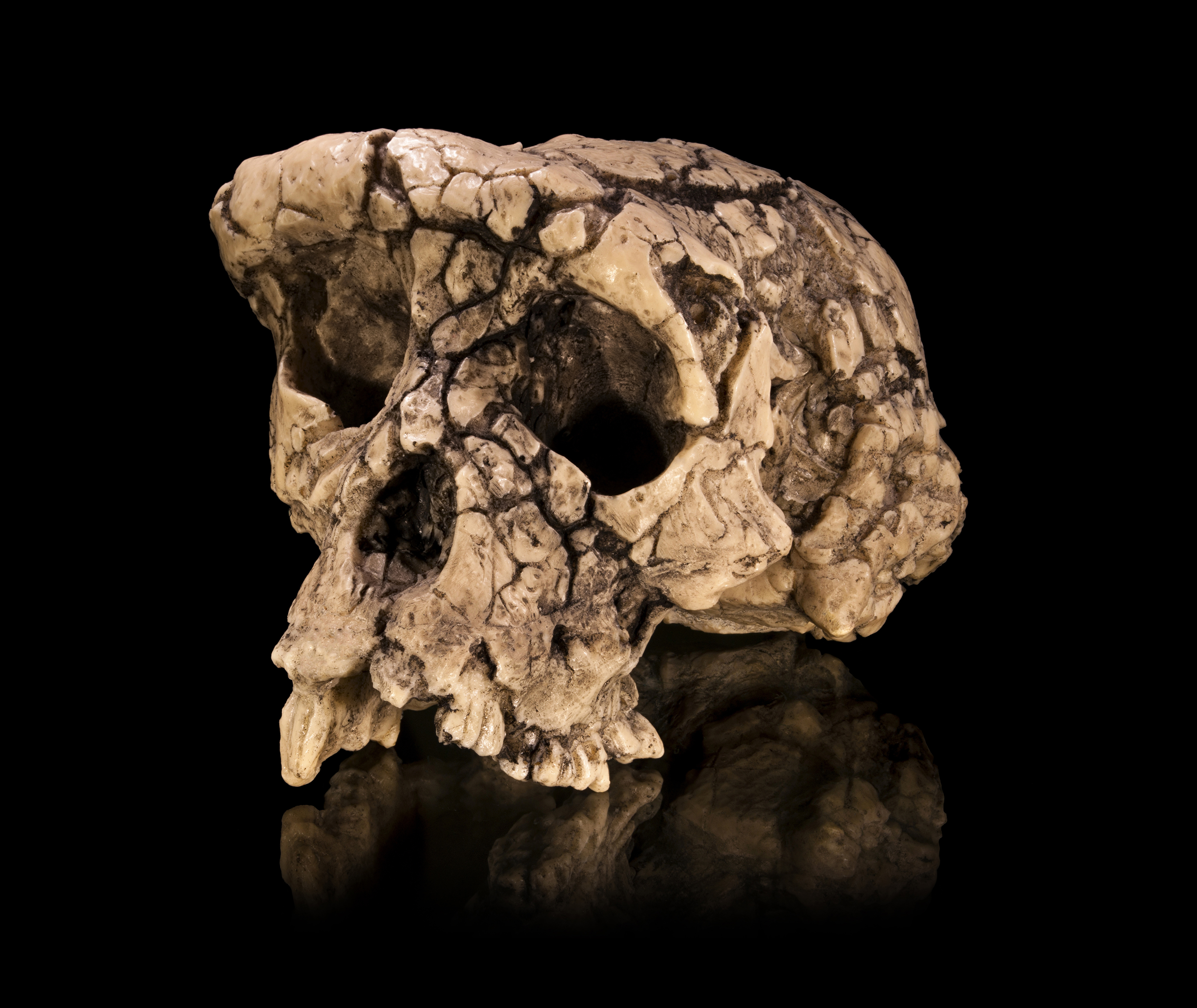
- Type: Fossil site

Location
- Coordinates: 16.2°N 17.5°E
- Approximate paleocoordinates: 14.7°N 17.7°E
- Region: Borkou
- Country: Chad
- Toros-Menalla (Chad)

Toros-Menalla is a key fossil site in Chad. it contains the remains of a wide range of Miocene species including the early human Sahelanthropus tchadensis. It is located in the Djurab Desert within the intracratonic Chad Basin. The sediments found in the basin are predominately lacustrine, fluviatile and aeolian.

== Geology ==
The lower part of the fossil site consists of very fine white sands. These sands are well rounded, well sorted, matt and frosted and where likely formed by aeolian modeling. Several fossil dunes are known from the site and represent some of the oldest evidence for desert conditions in the area. Their high directionality in paleocurrents suggests the area was mostly influenced by aeolian conditions. Higher layers in the formation produce rhizoliths suggesting that the area became wetter and more vegetated over time.

The middle section of Toros Menalla consists of the anthracotheriid unit. The majority of fossil species in this formation come from this unit, including vertebrates but also termite nests and root ducts. It contains matrix supported sandstone and clay. Changes in the fluvial dynamics of the fossil dunes at the site suggest the expansion of an ancient lake, formed from the same basin as modern Lake Chad into the site. Paleocurents are not only formed by aeolian sediments but include current and oscillation ripples suggesting the coexistence of a variety of habitats. including lacustrine, perilacustrine, and desert environments.

The upper section is entirely lacustrine and mainly consists of crocodiles, fish, and turtles It is made of diatomaceous earth and clay.

== Paleontology ==
The fossil site was first identified by researchers from the Mission Pale´oanthropologique Franco-Tchadienne during a 1993 survey. Subsequent excavations produced a wealth of vertabrate fossils including the early human Sahelanthropus, a wealth of carnivores, well preserved termite nests, and a large sample of the anthracothere Libycosaurus. Studies of the fauna suggest that the site is similar in age to the Lothagam Nawata formation, and the As Sahabi site in Libya

Dating of 28 samples of fossil material from Toros Menalla through ^{10}Be/^{9}Be dating suggests that the anthracotheriid unit dates between 6.8 and 7.2 Ma.

== Palaeoenvironment ==
The large diversity of semiaquatic and aquatic taxa in the anthracotheriid unit strongly demonstrates the presence of aquatic environments. Many of the fish found here are very large, over 1 meter, suggesting that the lake system here was quite extensive at the time. The presence of the finfoot Heliopais cf. personata, and dominance of polypterids and clariid catfish suggest that the water was marshy and poorly oxygenated. The diversity of land mammals here is suggestive of a mosaic of habitats including wooded savanna, grassland, wetlands, and possibly gallery forest, all along the shore of a massive lake.

== Fossil Material ==
=== Insects ===
==== Blattodea ====
Genus	Species	Family	Material	Notes	Images
Coatonichnus	C. globosus	Hodotermopsidae	Nest Traces of large sandstone balls in groups of ten or more	Referred to as Hodotermopsidae indt in 2002. Other termite ichnofossils uncommon when present	
Vondrichnus	V. planoglobus	Macrotermitinae	Many chambered tunnels, with a flat floor and arched top connected by main tunnel. Only found arranged horizontally it is unknown if these structures can form vertically	Affinities uncertain nests are likely Macrotermitinae and are most similar to Acanthotermes acanthothorax.Onion like chambers may be for fungus or waste	
Microfavichnus	M. alveolatus	Macrotermitinae	Honeycombed structures, preserved traces of fungus Gardens	A termite fungus comb	
Termitichnus	T. schneideri	Macrotermitinae	Shelved internal chambers, flat	May be connected to Vondrichnus nests	

==== Coleoptera ====
Genus	Species	Family	Material	Notes	Images
Scarabaeidae indt.		Scarabaeidae	Nest traces	Dung traces, often confused with Vondrichnus planoglobus	

=== Bony Fish ===
==== Polypteriformes ====
Genus	Species	Family	Material	Notes	Images
Polypterus	P. faraou	Polypteridae	A complete skeleton with isolated scales, a skull roof, and vertebrae	A bichir	

==== Osteoglossiformes ====
Genus	Species	Family	Material	Notes	Image
cf. Gymnarchus	cf. G. niloticus	Gymnarchidae	isolated teeth	the aba, the earliest record of this species in the fossil record	
Heterotis	cf. H. niloticus	Arapaimidae	a single opercule	Very rare at the site	

==== Cypriniformes ====
Genus	Species	Family	Material	Notes	Image
cf. Labeo	cf. L. sp	Cyprinidae	Isolated teeth	Scarce remains probably due to fragile skeleton	

==== Characiformes ====
Genus	Species	Family	Material	Notes	Image
Hydrocynus	H. sp	Alestidae	Hundreds of isolated teeth and some jaw fragments	Identified from their distinctive morphology, suggest fish of over a meter in length	
Alestinae indt. Alestes/Brycinus		Alestidae	Two teeth	The two genera cannot be separated on tooth morphology alone	
Sindacharax	S. sp	Alestidae	Isolated jaws and teeth, one premaxilla	No longer found in lake chad, may belong to an undescribed species	
? cf.Sindacharax sp. orBunocharax sp.		Alestidae	Two teeth	Does not exactly match teeth from either genus, large blunt uncupsed teeth likely from a molluscivore	

==== Siluriformes ====
Genus	Species	Family	Material	Notes	Image
Auchenoglanis	A. soye	Auchenoglanididae	fragmentary skulls and a dorsal spine	Oldest record of the genus, only known from the Anthracotheriid unit	
cf. Clarias	cf. C. sp	Clariidae	partial fin spines and skulls		
cf. Clarotes	cf. C sp.	Claroteidae	Skull bones, fin spines, vertebrae	Oldest known fossils of the genus	
Mochokus	M. gigas	Mochokidae	Skull and fin spines	over 10x larger then any modern Mochokus, rarity in the environment suggest low tolerance for the poorly oxygenated swampy conditions of the site.	
Synodontis	S. cf. clarias	Mochokidae	cleithrum		
Synodontis	S. cf. batensoda	Mochokidae	Fin spinescleithrum	Not present in modern Lake Chad	
Synodontis	Morphotype A	Mochokidae	cleithrum		
Synodontis	Morphotype B	Mochokidae	cleithrum		
Synodontis	S. cf. nigrita	Mochokidae	cleithrum		
Synodontis	“Straight morphotype"	Mochokidae	Fin spinescleithrum	Previously referred to as S. cf. schall	

==== Carangiformes ====
Genus	Species	Family	Material	Notes	Images
Lates	L. niloticus	Latidae	Skull material, vertebrae, fin spines	The modern Nile perch, very abundant	

==== Tetraodontiformes ====
Genus	Species	Family	Material	Notes	Images
Tetraodon	T. sp 1	Tetraodontidae	Beak elements	Some of the oldest freshwater puffers in Africa. T. sp 2 somewhat resembles T. lineatus	
Tetraodon	T. sp 2	Tetraodontidae	Beak elements	Some of the oldest freshwater puffers in Africa. T. sp 2 somewhat resembles T. lineatus	

==== Cichliformes ====
Genus	Species	Family	Material	Notes	Images
Cichlidae indt.		Cichlidae		Undescribed species	

==== Perciformes Incerate Sedis ====
Genus	Species	Family	Material	Notes	Images
Semlikiichthys	S. daso	Perciformes Incerate Sedis	Skull material and vertebrae	Formerly thought to be related to the Nile perch, classification uncertain	

=== Reptiles ===
==== Squamates ====
Genus	Species	Family	Material	Notes	Images
Colubridae indt.		Colubridae			
Python	P. cf sebae	Pythonidae		Similar to the modern rock python	
Varanus	V. sp	Varanidae			

==== Turtles ====
Genus	Species	Family	Material	Notes	Images
Trionychidae indt.		Trionychidae	Abundant skeletal material		
Testudinidae indt.		Testudinidae	Abundant skeletal material		

==== Crocodylians ====
Genus	Species	Family	Material	Notes	Images
Crocodylus	C. cf. niloticus	Crocodylidae	Abundant skeletal material	Similar to the modern Nile crocodile	
Euthecodon	E. cf. nitriae	Crocodylidae	Abundant skeletal material		
Gavialidae gen et sp. nov.		Gavialidae	Abundant skeletal material		

==== Anseriformes ====
Genus	Species	Family	Material	Notes	Image
Afrocygnus	A. chauvireae	Anatidae	Wing material	A swan, similar in size to C. atratus	
cf. Plectropterus	cf. P. sp	Anatidae	Wing material	Similar to the modern spur-winged goose	

==== Suliformes ====
Genus	Species	Family	Material	Notes	Image
Anhinga	A. cf. melanogaster	Anhingidae	Left humerus	Identical in morphology to the living oriental darter	
Anhinga	A. cf. pannonica	Anhingidae	Left humerus	Larger than A. cf. melanogaster but otherwise very similar. This species is also known from Europe	
Anhinga	A. sp	Anhingidae	Left and right humerus	Intermediate in size between the other Anhinga species so identify uncertain.	

==== Pelecaniformes ====
Genus	Species	Family	Material	Notes	Image
Ardea	A. sp	Ardeidae	left humerus	Similar in size to A. alba	
Ephippiorhynchus	E. tchoufour	Ciconiidae	tarsometatarsus	50% larger than modern Ephippiorhynchus, possibly up too 2 m – 2.20 m making it one of the tallest flying birds known.	
Ephippiorhynchus/Leptoptilos	sp. A, small	Ciconiidae	tarsometatarsus	Similar in size to E. senegalensis, proportions do not allow identification to genus	
Ephippiorhynchus/Leptoptilos	sp. B, large	Ciconiidae	Limb material	Very large, may belong to E. tchoufour or another species of large stork such as L. falconeri	
Mycteria	M. sp	Ciconiidae	tibiotarsus	Likely a juvenile. Indicates the presence of large trees for nesting in the area	
Mycteria / Ciconia. sp		Ciconiidae	fragmentary coracoid and a femur	Similar to both genera, size of M. ibis	

==== Accipitriformes ====
Genus	Species	Family	Material	Notes	Image
Accipitridae indet.		Accipitridae	complete pedal phalanx 1 of left digit III	Similar in size to Aegypius monachus	

==== Gruiformes ====
Genus	Species	Family	Material	Notes	Image
Balearica	B. sp	Gruidae	femur	The earliest representative of a crowned crane in Africa	
Heliopais	H. cf. personata	Heliornithidae	right humerus	The second known fossil sungrebe. Modern representatives of this species are exclusively Asian Indicative of an open freshwater body with abundant overhanging vegetation	
Rallidae / Heliornithidae indet.		Rallidae / Heliornithidae	ulna	matches proportions of both rails and sungrebes, if a rail similar in size to Fulica atra	

=== Mammals ===
==== Tubulidentata ====
Genus	Species	Family	Material	Notes	Image
Amphiorycteropus	A. abundulafus	Orycteropodidae	Nearly complete skeleton		

==== Proboscideans ====
Genera	Species	Family	Material	Notes	Image
Anancus	A. kenyensis	Elephantoidea	Mandibles teeth and skull material		
Anancus	A. petrocchii?	Elephantoidea		Possible remains of this species. Very large.	
Deinotherium	D. nov. sp	Deinotheriidae			
Loxodonta	L. cooki	Elephantidae	Molars	similar to L. cooki material from Langebaanweg	
Loxodonta	L. nov. sp. C.	Elephantidae			
Primelephas	P. korotorensis	Elephantidae	Teeth and jaw material		
Stegodon	S. nov. sp. A.	Stegodontidae			
Stegodibelodon	S. schneideri	Elephantidae			
Stegotetrabelodon	S. syrticus	Elephantidae			

==== Lagomorphs ====
Genus	Species	Family	Material	Notes	Image
Serengetilagus	S. tchadensis	Leporidae	Skull jaw and limb material	Very well preserved, likely from flooding enclosing it in its burrow	

==== Rodents ====
Genus	Species	Family	Material	Notes	Image
Hystrix	H. sp	Hystricidae			
Arvicanthis	A. sp	Muridae	Molars		
Murinae indet.		Muridae			
Gerbillinae indet.		Muridae			
Sabara	S. oralacus	Sciuridae	Skull	Great preservation likely from being buried in its burrow immediately after death. Ground living species	

==== Primates ====
Genus	Species	Family	Material	Notes	Image
Cercopithecoides	C. bruneti	Cercopithecidae	Skull and jaw fragments partial right forelimb	Semi-terrestrial	
Sahelanthropus	S. tchadensis	Hominidae	Complete skull, fragments of jaw and limb material	A possible hominin, one of the oldest known from the fossil record.	

==== Carnivorans ====
Genus	Species	Family	Material	Notes	Image
Amphicyonidae indt.		Amphicyonidae			
Vulpes	V. riffautae	Canidae	mandibular material and teeth	The oldest canid found in Africa	
Adeliosmilus	A. kabir	Felidae	Jaw, partial skull, humerus		
Felidae gen. et sp. indet. A		Felidae	Mandible	Caracal sized cat	
Felis	F. sp	Felidae	Near complete skeleton	Remains encrusted with sediment making removal and study difficult. Similar to Felis silvestris	
Lokotunjailurus	L. fanonei	Felidae	Partial skull	Holotype material from this site	
Megantereon	M. sp	Felidae			
Tchadailurus	T. adei	Felidae	Partial skeleton and skull	May belong to Yoshi instead	
Galerella	G. sanguinea	Herpestidae	Teeth		
Herpestes	H. sp	Herpestidae	Teeth and jaws	Larger than G. sanguinea, probably solitary	
Chasmaporthetes	C. cf. australis	Hyaenidae			
Belbus	B. djurabensis	Hyaenidae	Skull and teeth		
Werdelinus	W. africanus	Hyaenidae	Fragmantary skull mandibles and teeth		
Hyaenictitherium	H. minimum	Hyaenidae	Skull and Limb material		
Djourabus	D.dabba	Mustelidae	Jaw fragment	A large otter, more robust than Sivaonyx	
Howellictis	H. valentini	Mustelidae	several skulls, vertebrae and limb bone fragments	A mellivorine	
Lutrinae gen. et sp. indet. cf. Aonyx sp.		Mustelidae	Femur		
Lutrinae gen. and sp. indet. aff. Sivaonyx/Djourabus sp		Mustelidae		Smaller than either genus so identification uncertain	
Lutrinae gen. and sp. indet. aff. Torolutra sp		Mustelidae	Mandible	specialized for fish eating, the mandible is similar in size to Pteronura brasiliensis	
Sivaonyx	S. beyi	Mustelidae	Partial skeleton	A gigantic otter, one of the largest mustelids known form the fossil record, shows evidence of being more terrestrial than modern species.	
Sahelictis	S. korei	Viverridae	Mandible, vertebra and limb material	A large Civet	
Viverridae gen. et sp		Viverridae	Mandible, vertebra and limb material		

==== Artiodactyls ====
Genus	Species	Family	Material	Notes	Image
Libycosaurus	L. petrocchii	Anthracotheriidae	Skull, vertebrae, limb material	One of the most common species at the site representing 14% of all individuals	
Paracamelus	P. gigas	Camelidae	Jaw and limb material	Found in ‘South Toros Mentalla’, a younger layer than the anthracotheriid unit. The oldest known camel fossil in Africa	
Aepyceros	A. sp	Bovidae			
Alcelaphini indt		Bovidae			
Bovini indt.		Bovidae			
Gazella	G. sp	Bovidae			
Kobus	K. sp	Bovidae			
Reduncini indet		Bovidae			
Saheloryx	S. solidus	Bovidae	Horn cores, skulls, and mandibles	Many differences in skull structure from Tchadotragus unlikely to be the same species	
Tchadotragus	T. sudrei	Bovidae	Horn cores and skull fragments	Close to the base of hippotragine with Saheloryx, "medium sized"	
Bohlinia	B. adoumi	Giraffidae	Fragmentary skull, mandibles, and ossicones		
Giraffa	G. jumae	Giraffidae			
Sivatherium	S. cf. hendeyi	Giraffidae			
Hexaprotodon	H. garyam	Hippopotamidae	Skull, neck vertebrae, and limb material		
Nyanzachoerus	N. khinzir	Suidae	Skulls, jaws and teeth	Formerly considered to be N. syrticus	
Nyanzachoerus	N. cf. australis	Suidae	Skulls	Found in ‘South Toros Mentalla’, a younger layer than the anthracotheriid unit	

==== Perissodactyls ====
Genus	Species	Family	Material	Notes	Images
Hipparion	H. cf. abudhabiense	Equidae		Highly similar to Upper Miocene material from the United Arab Emirates	

=== Angiosperms ===
Rosids

Genus	Species	Family	Material	Notes	Images
Faboideae indt.		Faboideae		"liana-like" suggests a forest bordering a lake	

=== Fungi ===
==== Agaricales ====
Genus	Species	Family	Material	Notes	Images
Termitomyces	T. sp	Lyophyllaceae	Preserved traces of termite fungus Gardens	presence suggested through trace fossils of termite nests	
