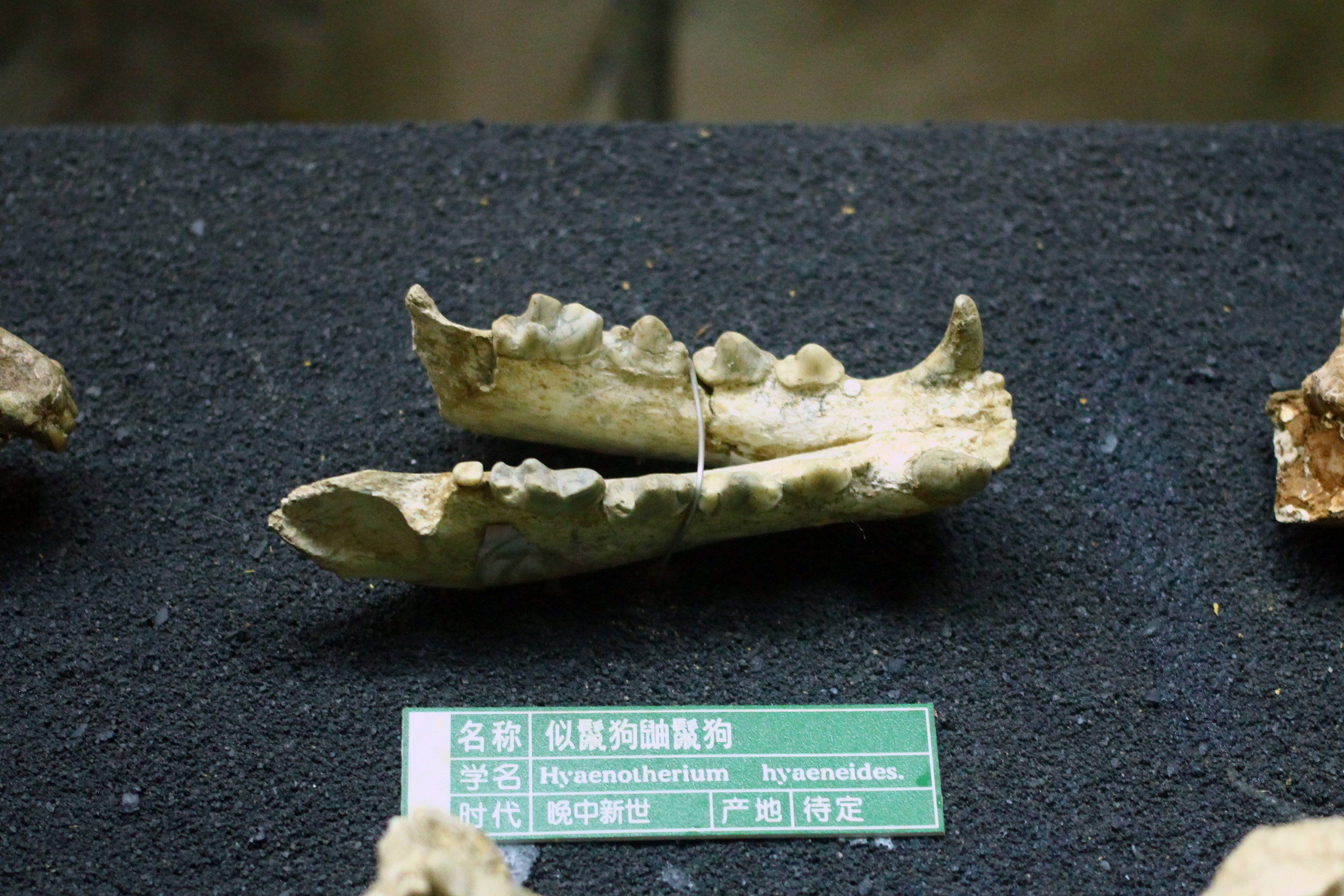
- Hyaenotherium hyaeneides mandible

Scientific classification
- Kingdom: Animalia
- Phylum: Chordata
- Class: Mammalia
- Infraclass: Placentalia
- Order: Carnivora
- Family: Hyaenidae
- Subfamily: †Ictitheriinae
- Genus: †Hyaenotherium; Semenov, 1989

Type species
- †Hyaenotherium wongii (Zdansky, 1924)

Other species
- †H. ebu (Werdelin, 2005)

Synonyms
- Species synonymy: H. wongii: Ictitherium hipparionum (Gervais, 1846) Gaudryi, 1862; Palhyaena hipparionum (Gervais 1846) Kittl, 1887; Ictitherium wongii Zdansky, 1924; Ictitherium ?wongii (Zdansky, 1924) Kretzoi, 1938; Hyaenalopex atticus Kretzoi, 1952; Palhyaena wongii (Zdansky, 1924) Howell & Petter, 1980; Thalassictis wongii (Zdansky, 1924) Solounias, 1981; Thalassictis mesotes Kurtén, 1985; Hyaenotherium magnum Semenov, 1989; H. ebu: Ictitherium ebu Werdelin, 2005

= Hyaenotherium =

Hyaenotherium Temporal range: Late Miocene (Vallesian to Turolian)

Extinct genus of carnivores

Hyaenotherium is an extinct genus of hyaenids that lived in Eurasia and Africa during the Late Miocene. The type species, H. wongii, was one of the most numerous Eurasian hyaenids. More than 100 specimens of H. wongii have been discovered in China. H. ebu from Lothagam, Kenya, differs from the type species by its limbs which are longer and significantly thinner.

== Taxonomy ==
Some authors argue that Hyaenotherium is a junior synonym of Hyaenictitherium (Kretzoi, 1938).

== Palaeobiology ==
H. ebu had long, stilt-like limbs, which are believed to be an adaptation for increased locomotor efficiency as well as being able to see further, especially in environments with lots of tall grass. These long, gracile limbs would also have made it suitable for pouncing on unsuspecting prey. This feature suggests that H. ebu had a lifestyle similar to the maned wolf.
