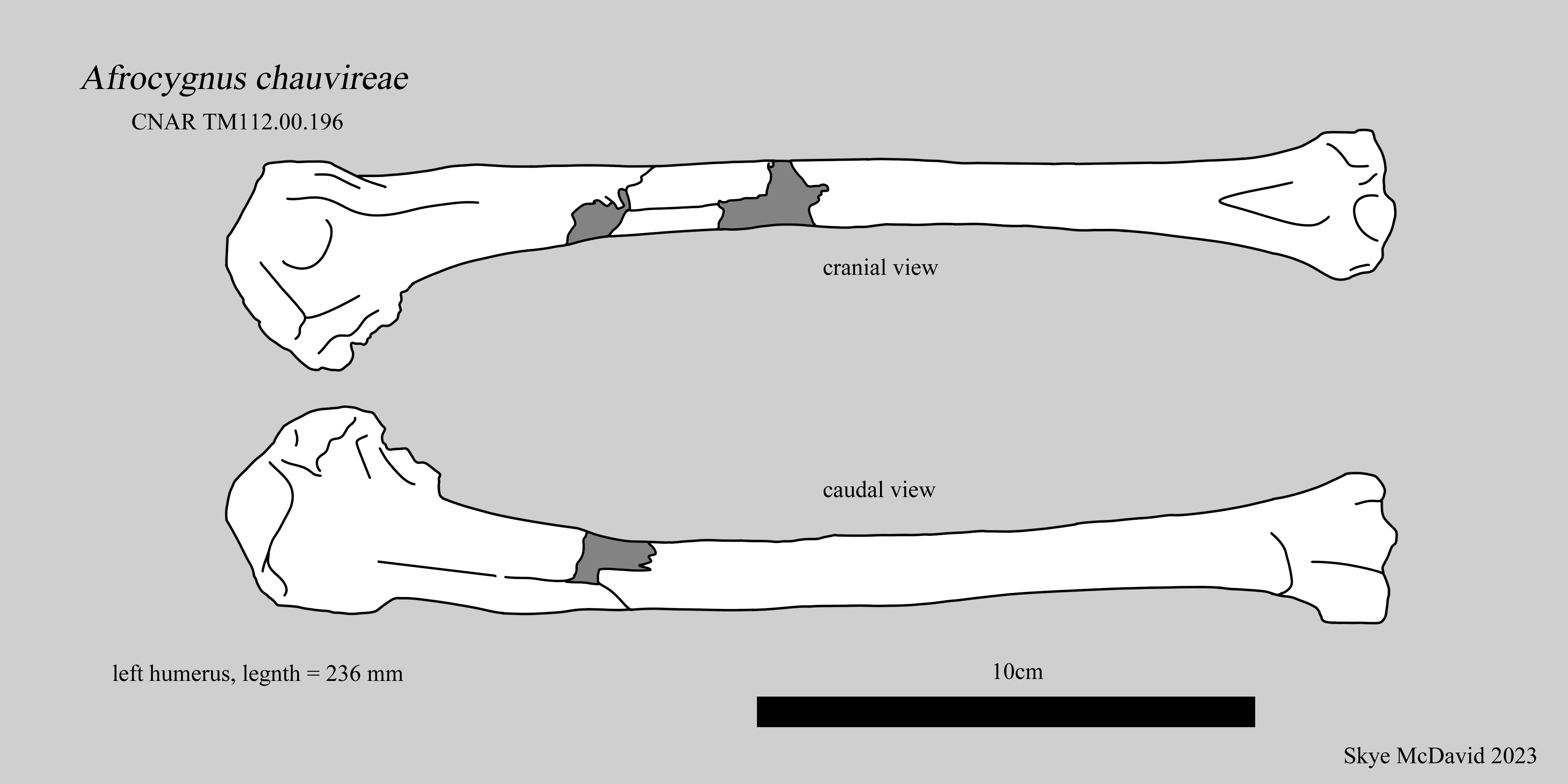
- Illustration of holotype humerus

Scientific classification
- Kingdom: Animalia
- Phylum: Chordata
- Class: Aves
- Order: Anseriformes
- Family: Anatidae
- Subfamily: Anserinae
- Tribe: Cygnini
- Genus: †Afrocygnus; Louchart et al, 2005

Type species
- †Afrocygnus chauvireae Louchart et al, 2005

= Afrocygnus =

Afrocygnus Temporal range: Miocene-Pliocene boundary (Messinian), 7–5.3 Ma

Extinct genus of birds

Afrocygnus is an extinct genus of swan, which lived during the Late Miocene, and perhaps up to the Late Pliocene, in what is today North Africa. The only genus of swan known in Africa, aside from fragmentary Pleistocene remains found in East Africa and from occasional observations of vagrant European swans along the Mediterranean coast, it lived in what was during the Miocene a damp wetland spanning from Libya to Chad, alongside the Antracothere Libycosaurus and the early Homininae Sahelanthropus. The genus is considered as the sister taxon of the extant genus Cygnus. Fossils of the genus have been uncovered in the Sahabi Formation of Cyrenaica in Libya, and in the Toros-Menalla locality in the Djurab Desert of Northern Chad.

== History and naming ==
Fossils associated with Afrocygnus were first described in 1987 by Peter Ballmann from remains found in the Sahabi Formation of Libya. They were originally identified as an indeterminate Anseriform. In 2005, a new study by Louchart, Wilru, Likius, Taisso Mackaye and Brunet described new remains found at Toros-Menalla in the Djurab Desert, in Chad, and established a new genus and species, Afrocygnus chauvireae, using TM112.00.196, a complete left humerus, as holotype. The fragmentary remains found in 1987 in Libya were associated to the genus, and tentatively to the type species.

The genus name, Afrocygnus, is composed of Afro-, meaning "of Africa", and -cygnus, meaning "swan". The species name, chauvireae, honours the French paleontologist Cécile Mourer-Chauviré.
