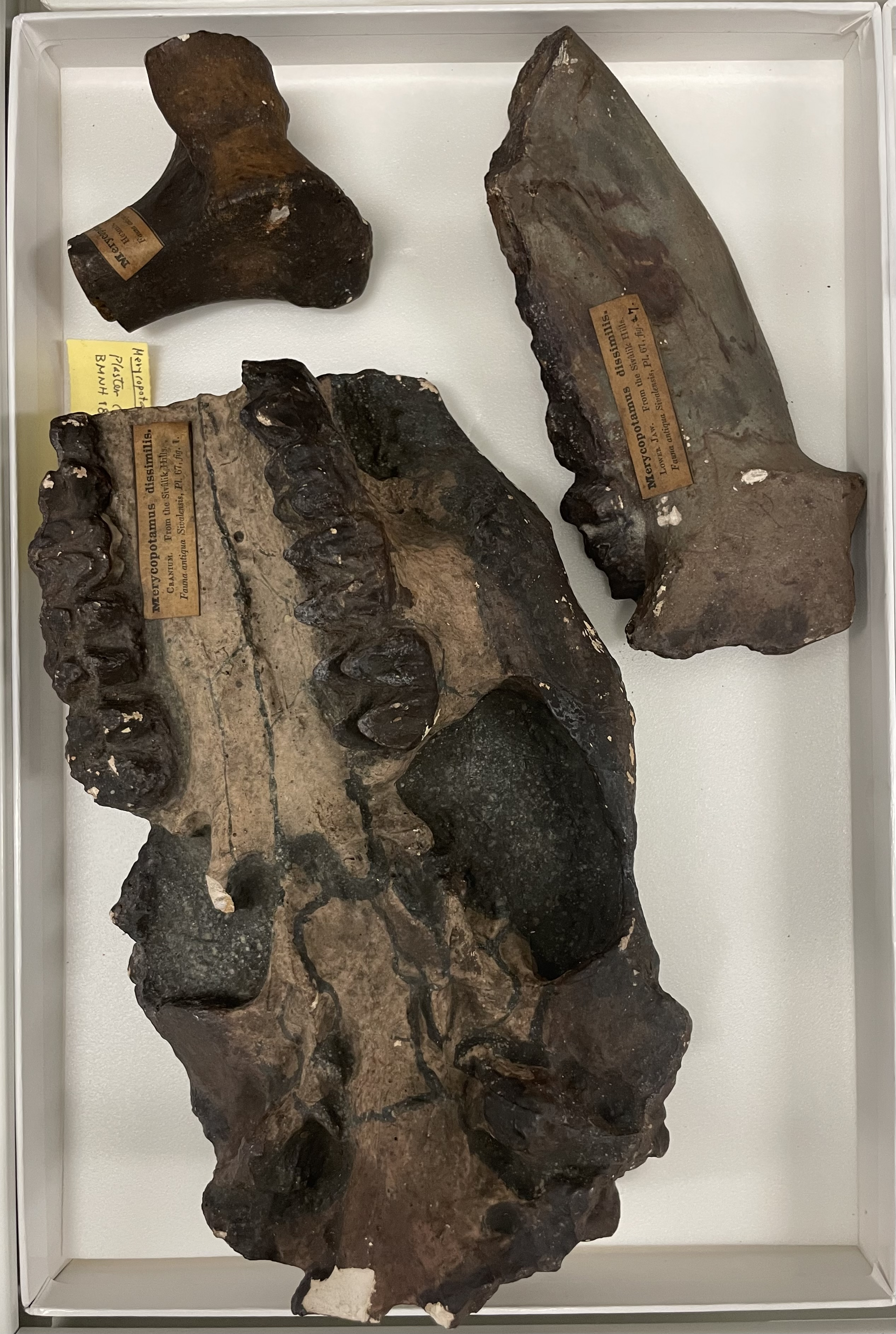
- Fossil casts of Merycopotamus dissimilis at the Academy of Natural Sciences, Philadelphia

Scientific classification
- Kingdom: Animalia
- Phylum: Chordata
- Class: Mammalia
- Order: Artiodactyla
- Family: †Anthracotheriidae
- Subfamily: †Bothriodontinae
- Genus: †Merycopotamus; Falconer & Cautley, 1847

Type species
- †Merycopotamus dissimilis

Species
- †M. dissimilis; †M. medioximus; †M. nanus; †M. thachangensis

= Merycopotamus =

Merycopotamus Temporal range: Middle Miocene–Late Pliocene

Extinct genus of mammals

Merycopotamus is an extinct genus of Asian anthracothere that appeared during the Middle Miocene, and died out in the Late Pliocene. At the height of the genus' influence, species ranged throughout South Asia and South East Asia (Indonesia, Myanmar, and Thailand). With the extinction of the last species, M. dissimilis, the lineage of anthracotheres came to an end. Merycopotamus was closely related to the anthracothere genus Libycosaurus, which, unlike the former, never left Africa. In fact, some African fossils originally placed in Merycopotamus, but are now referred to Libycosaurus.
