= Werdelinus =

Werdelinus Temporal range: Late Miocene to Pliocene (Messinian to Zanclean)

Scientific classification
- Kingdom: Animalia
- Phylum: Chordata
- Class: Mammalia
- Order: Carnivora
- Family: Hyaenidae
- Genus: †Werdelinus; Bonis et al., 2010

Type species
- †Werdelinus africanus Bonis et al., 2010

Extinct genus of carnivores

Werdelinus is an extinct genus of hyaenid containing a single known species. Werdelinus africanus is known by material from Toros-Menalla, Chad. It lived during the Late Miocene and the Pliocene. Dental wear of Werdelinus africanus indicates that Werdelinus likely had durophagous adaptations, including adaptations to bone-crushing. Analysis of the lower dentition of W. africanus suggests that it was likely durophagous and cursorial.

== Characteristics ==
Werdelinus africanus is a large hyaenid characterized by a deep maxilla, low premolars, and a large m1 molar, but significantly reduced M1 and m2 molars. Its maxilla is deeper than those of most hyaenids. Its mandible corpus is shallower than those of most modern hyaenids, including the brown hyena, the striped hyena, and the spotted hyena, and excluding the aardwolf. Despite being shallow its mandible corpus is robust and in life was likely very sturdy to support the probable durophagous tendencies of W. africanus.

Werdelinus from Toros-Menalla, Chad, is distinct from other fossil hyaenids known from the same area by characteristics such as its size. W. africanus is larger than Hyaenictitherium minimum (Bonis et al., 2005) and Belbus djurabensis (Bonis et al., 2010) from Toros-Menalla. W. africanus is smaller than Chasmaporthetes cf. australis from Toros-Menalla. In comparison to Chasmaporthetes cf. australis, W. africanus has less robust, less elongated, and lower premolars. The mandible of W. africanus is less robust than that of Chasmaporthetes cf. australis.

== Etymology ==
The generic name Werdelinus was chosen in honor of the Paleontologist Lars Werdelin. The specific name of Werdelinus africanus is derived from Africa, the continent where this species was discovered.
