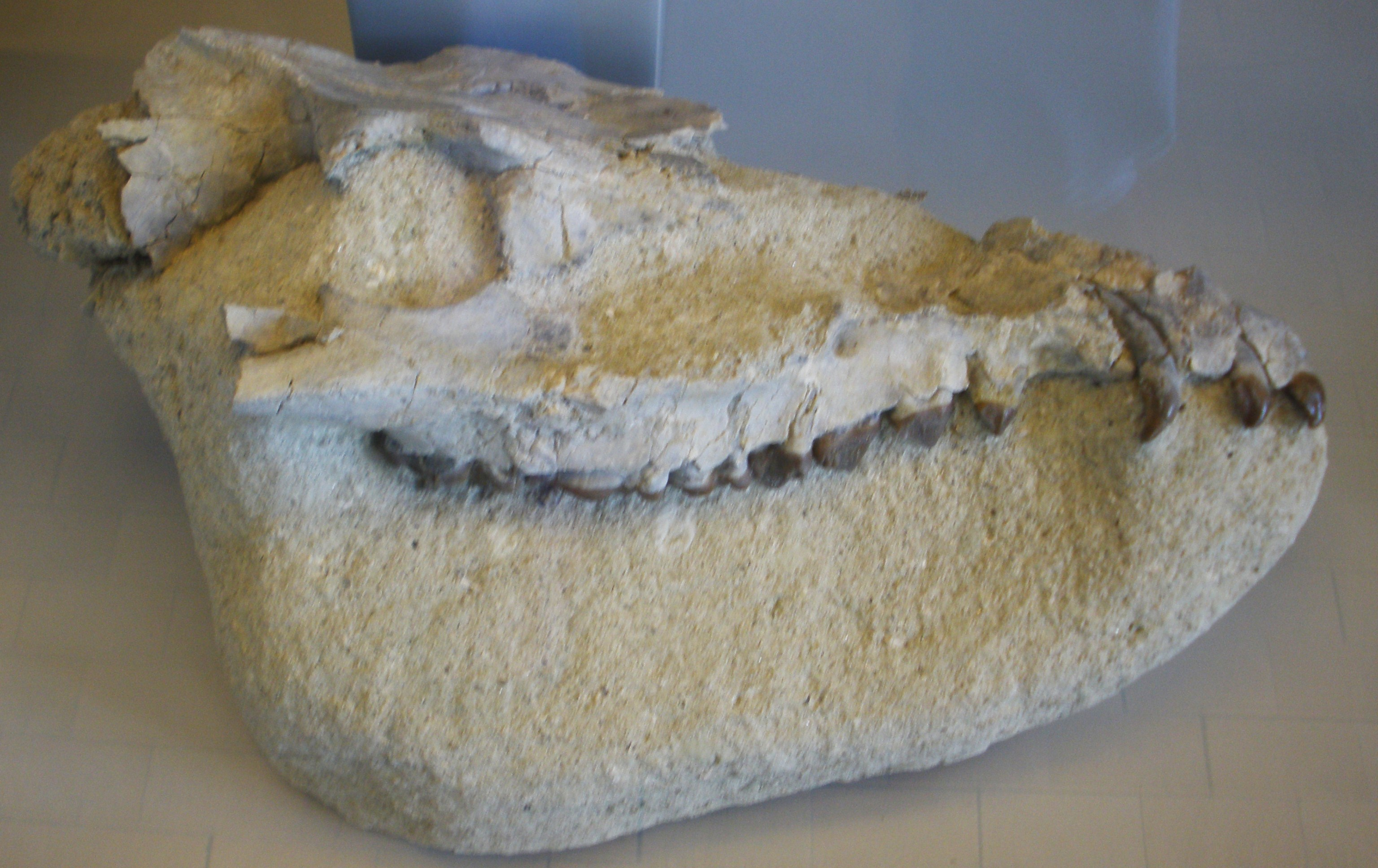
- Skull of Elomeryx

Scientific classification
- Kingdom: Animalia
- Phylum: Chordata
- Class: Mammalia
- Order: Artiodactyla
- Superfamily: Hippopotamoidea
- Family: †Anthracotheriidae
- Subfamily: †Bothriodontinae; Scott, 1940

Genera
- †Aegyptomeryx; †Aepinacodon; †Afromerycops; †Afromeryx; †Bakalovia; †Bothriodon; †Bothriogenys; †Brachyodus; †Chitenaymeryx; †Elomeryx; †Epirigenys; †Hemimeryx; †Kukusepasutanka; †Libycomeryx; †Libycosaurus; †Maradameryx; †Masrimeryx; †Merycops; †Merycopotamus; †Mogharameryx; †Nacholameryx; †Parabrachyodus; †Prolibycosaurus; †Qatraniodon; †Rusingameryx; †Sivameryx; †Telmatodon; †Ulausuodon

= Bothriodontinae =

Bothriodontinae Temporal range: Middle Eocene–Early Pliocene Survival in Hippopotamidae

Extinct subfamily of mammals

The bothriodontines are a paraphyletic assemblage of anthracotheres that originated from Eurasia in the late middle Eocene (Bartonian). The group can be distinguished from other anthracothere lineages by their upper molars having a mesostyle occupied by a transverse valley, selenodont cusps, a ventrally concave symphysis, elongated muzzles, and a diastema between the canine and first premolar tooth. During their evolution, the bothriodontines evolved from small basal forms such as Qatraniodon into larger taxa such as Libycosaurus and Merycopotamus. In some genera, the snouts became even more elongated and teeth specialized in a folivorous diet (e.g., Bothriodon, Aepinacodon), while others like Merycopotamus developed wide, heavy, and shallow muzzles with teeth more adapted for grazing.
