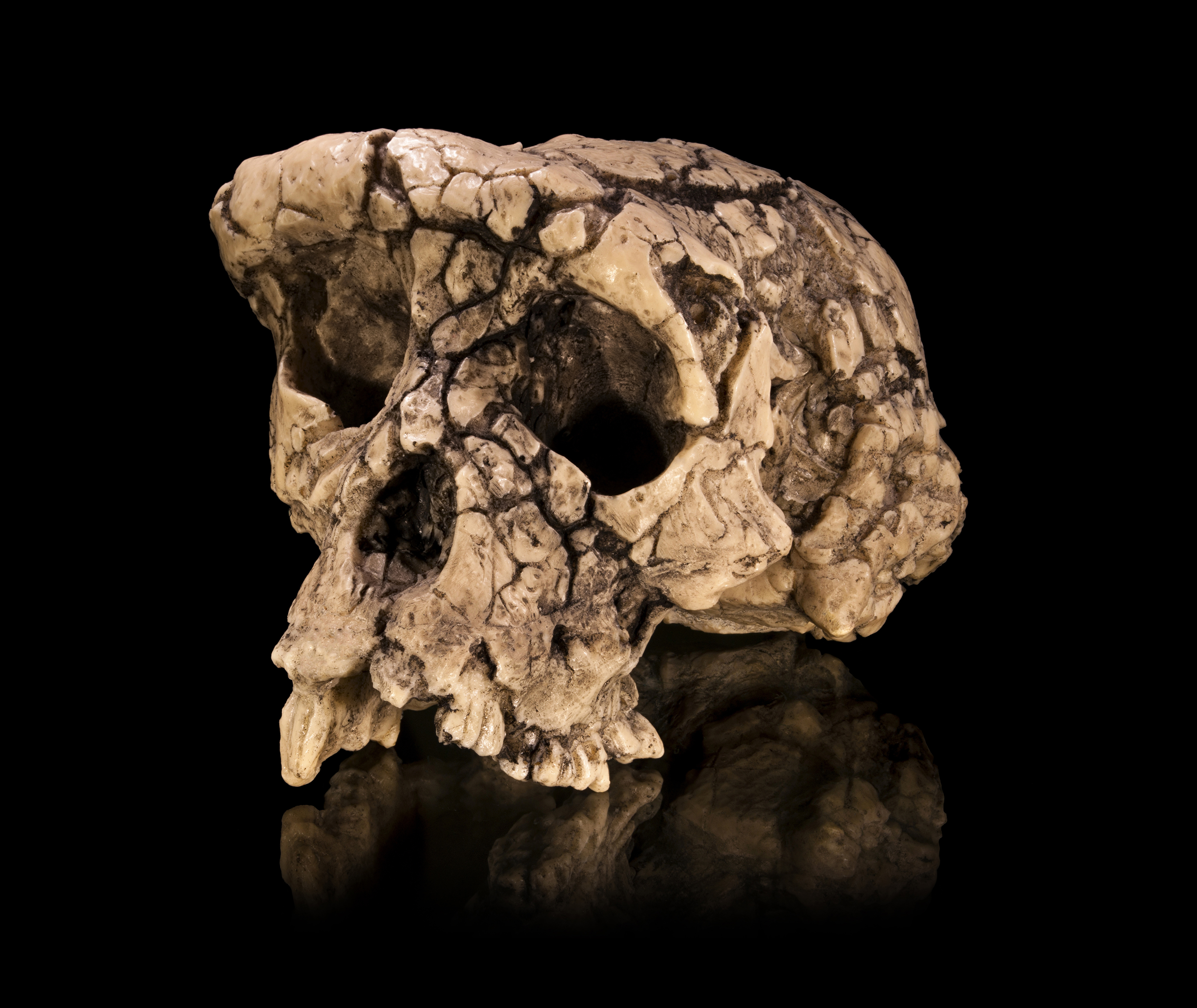
- Cast of the skull of Toumaï

Scientific classification
- Kingdom: Animalia
- Phylum: Chordata
- Class: Mammalia
- Order: Primates
- Superfamily: Hominoidea
- Family: Hominidae
- Genus: †Sahelanthropus; Brunet et al., 2002
- Species: †S. tchadensis

Binomial name
- †Sahelanthropus tchadensis Brunet et al., 2002

= Sahelanthropus =

Sahelanthropus tchadensis "Toumaï" Temporal range: Messinian, 7–6 Ma

Extinct hominid from Miocene Africa

Sahelanthropus is an extinct genus of hominid dated to about 7 million years ago during the Late Miocene. The type species, Sahelanthropus tchadensis, was first announced in 2002, based mainly on a partial cranium, nicknamed Toumaï, discovered in northern Chad.

The definitive phylogenetic position of Sahelanthropus within the hominids is uncertain. It was initially described as a possible hominin ancestral to both humans and chimpanzees, but subsequent interpretations suggest that it could be an early member of the tribe Gorillini or a stem-hominid outside the hominins. The supposed bipedality based on the postcranial skeleton of Sahelanthropus has also been a subject of debate among paleoanthropologists.

== Taxonomy ==
=== Discovery ===
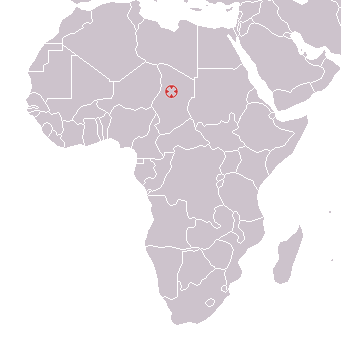
Location of discovery

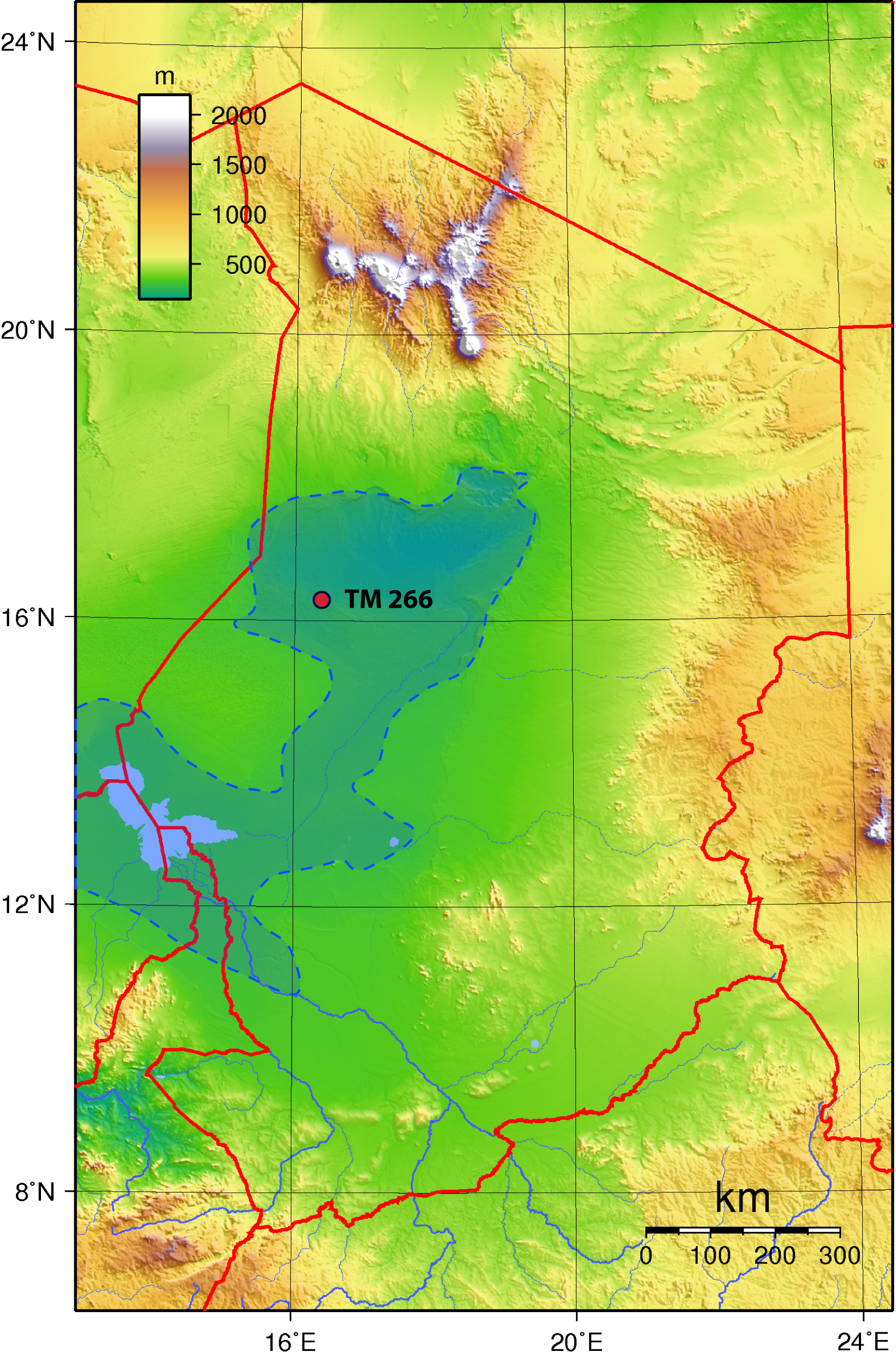
Map detail

Four employees of the Centre National d'Appui à la Recherche (CNAR, National Research Support Center) of the Ministry of Higher Education of the Republic of Chad, three Chadians (Ahounta Djimdoumalbaye, Fanoné Gongdibé and Mahamat Adoum) and one French (Alain Beauvilain) collected and identified the first remains in the Toros-Menalla area (TM 266 locality) in the Djurab Desert of northern Chad, July 19, 2001.

By the time Michel Brunet and colleagues formally described the remains in 2002, a total of six specimens had been recovered: a nearly complete but heavily deformed skull, a fragment of the midline of the jaw with the tooth sockets for an incisor and canine, a right third molar, a right first incisor, a right jawbone with the last premolar to last molar, and a right canine. With the skull as the holotype specimen, they were grouped into a new genus and species as Sahelanthropus tchadensis, the genus name referring to the Sahel, and the species name to Chad. These, along with Australopithecus bahrelghazali, were the first discoveries of any fossil African great ape (outside the genus Homo) made beyond eastern and southern Africa. By 2005, a third premolar was recovered from the TM 266 locality, a lower jaw missing the region behind the second molar from the TM 292 locality, and a lower left jaw preserving the sockets for premolars and molars from the TM 247 locality.

The skull was nicknamed Toumaï by the then-president of the Republic of Chad, Idriss Déby, not only because, in the local Daza language, it means "hope of life", given to infants born just before the dry season and who, therefore, have fairly limited chances of survival, but also to celebrate the memory of one of his comrades-in-arms, living in the north of the country where the fossil was discovered, and killed fighting to overthrow President Hissène Habré supported by France. Toumaï also became a source of national pride, and Brunet announced the discovery before the Ministry of Foreign Affairs and a television audience in the capital of N'Djamena, "l'ancêtre de l'humanité est Tchadien...Le berceau de l'humanité se trouve au Tchad. Toumaï est votre ancêtre" ("The ancestor of humanity is Chadian...The cradle of humanity is in Chad. Toumaï is your ancestor.").

Toumaï had been found with a femur, but this was stored with animal bones and shipped to the University of Poitiers in 2003, where it was stumbled upon by graduate student Aude Bergeret the next year. She took the bone to the head of the Department of Geosciences, Roberto Macchiarelli, who considered it to be inconsistent with bipedalism contra what Brunet et al. had earlier stated in their description analysing only the distorted skull. This was conspicuous because Brunet and his team had already explicitly stated Toumaï was associated with no limb bones, which could have proven or disproven their conclusions of locomotion. Because Brunet had declined to comment on the subject, Macchiarelli and Bergeret petitioned to present their preliminary findings during an annual conference organised by the Anthropological Society of Paris, which would be held at Poitiers that year. This was rejected as they had not formally published their findings yet. They were able to publish a full description in 2020, and concluded Sahelanthropus was not bipedal.

In 2022, French primatologist Franck Guy and colleagues reported that a hominin left femur (TM 266-01-063), and a right (TM 266-01-358) and left (TM 266-01-050) ulna (forearm bone) were also discovered at the site in 2001, but were excluded originally from Sahelanthropus because they could not be reliably associated with the skull. They decided to include it because Sahelanthropus is the only hominin known from the site, and they concluded that the material is consistent with obligate bipedalism, the earliest evidence of such. In 2023, Meyer and colleagues suggested that its phylogenetic position and its status as a hominin still remain equivocal.

All Sahelanthropus specimens, representing six to nine different adults, have been recovered within the same 0.73 km^{2} (0.28 sq mi) area.

=== Taphonomy ===
Upon description, Brunet and colleagues were able to constrain the TM 266 locality to 7 or 6 million years ago (near the end of the Late Miocene) based on the animal assemblage, which made Sahelanthropus the earliest African ape at the time. In 2008, Anne-Elisabeth Lebatard and colleagues (which includes Brunet) attempted to radiometrically date using the ^{10}Be/^{9}Be ratio the sediments Toumaï was found near (dubbed the "anthracotheriid unit" after the commonplace Libycosaurus petrochii). Averaging the ages of 28 samples, they reported an approximate date of 7.2–6.8 million years ago.

Their methods were soon challenged by Beauvilain, who clarified that Toumaï was found on loose sediments at the surface rather than being "unearthed", and had probably been exposed to the harsh sun and wind for some time considering it was encrusted in an iron shell and desert varnish. This would mean it is unsafe to assume that the skull and nearby sediments were deposited at the same time, making such radiometric dating impossible. Further, the Sahelanthropus fossils lack white silaceous cement, which is present on every other fossil in the site, which would mean they date to different time periods.

Because the large mammal fossils were scattered across the area instead of concentrated like the Sahelanthropus fossils, the discoverers originally believed the Sahelanthropus fossils were dumped there by a palaeontologist or geologist, but later dismissed this because the skull seemed too complete to have been thrown away.

In 2009, Alain Beauvilain and Jean-Pierre Watté argued that Toumaï was purposefully buried in a "grave", because the skull was also found with two parallel rows of large mammal fossils, seemingly forming a 100 cm × 40 cm (3.3 ft × 1.3 ft) box. Because the "grave" is orientated in a northeast–southwest direction towards Mecca, and all sides of the skull were exposed to the wind and were eroded (meaning the skull had somehow turned), they argued that Toumaï was first buried by nomads who identified the skull as human and collected nearby limb fossils (believing them to belong with the skull) and buried them, and was reburied again sometime after the 11th century by Muslims who reorientated the grave towards Mecca when the fossils were re-exposed.

=== Classification ===
Hominin timeline
← / Earlier apes; ← / Gorilla split; ← / Chimpanzee split; ← / Earliest bipedal; ← / Earliest sign of Ardipithecus; ← / Earliest sign of Australopithecus; ← / Earliest stone tools; ← / Earliest sign of Homo; ← / Dispersal beyond Africa; ← / Earliest fire / cooking; ← / Earliest rock art; ← / Earliest clothes; ← / Modern humans
(million years ago)

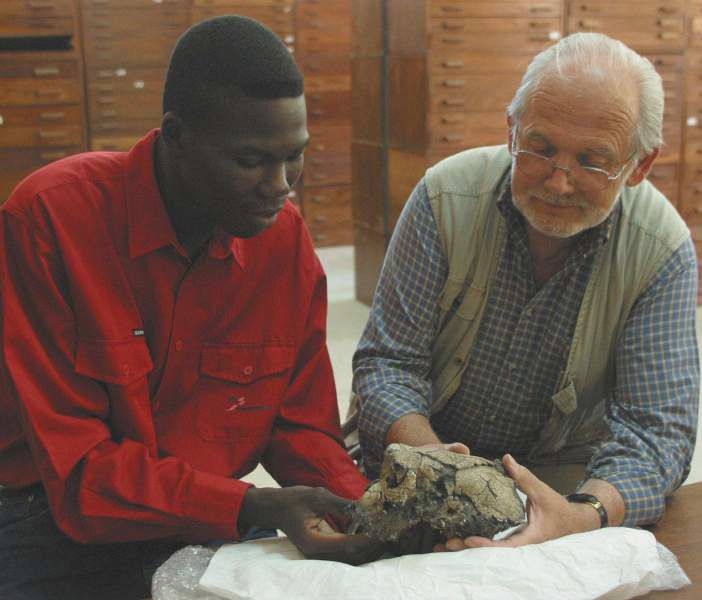
Michel Brunet (right) and Ahounta Djimdoumalbaye look at the reconstructed Sahelanthropus tchadensis skull in N'Djamena (Chad) in the premises of the National Research Support Center.

When describing the species in 2002, Brunet et al. noted the combination of features that would be considered archaic or derived for a species on the human line (the subtribe Hominina), the latter being bipedal locomotion and reduced canine teeth, which they interpreted as evidence of its position near the chimpanzee–human last common ancestor (CHLCA). This classification made Sahelanthropus the oldest Hominina, shifting the centre of origin for the clade away from East Africa. They also suggested that Sahelanthropus could be a sister group to the 5.5-to-4.5-million-year-old Ardipithecus and later Hominina. The classification of Sahelanthropus in Hominina, as well as Ardipithecus and the 6-million-year-old Orrorin, was at odds with molecular analyses of the time, which had placed the CHLCA between 6 and 4 million years ago based on a high mutation rate of about 70 mutations per generation. All these genera were anatomically too derived to represent a basal hominin (the group containing chimps and humans), so molecular data would only permit their classification into more ancient and now-extinct lineages. This was overturned in 2012 by geneticists Aylwyn Scally and Richard Durbin, who studied the genomes of children and their parents and found the mutation rate was actually half that, placing the CHLCA anywhere from 14 to 7 million years ago, though most geneticists and palaeoanthropologists use 8 to 7 million years ago. A recent phylogenetic analysis classified Orrorin as a hominin, but placed Sahelanthropus as a stem-hominid outside hominins, though dental metric analysis supports its position as a hominin.

A further possibility is that Toumaï is not ancestral to either humans or chimpanzees at all, but rather an early representative of the Gorillini lineage. Brigitte Senut and Martin Pickford, the discoverers of Orrorin tugenensis, suggested that the features of S. tchadensis are consistent with a female proto-gorilla. Even if this claim is upheld, the find would lose none of its significance, because at present very few chimpanzee or gorilla ancestors have been found anywhere in Africa. Thus, if S. tchadensis is an ancestral relative of the chimpanzees or gorillas, then it represents the earliest-known member of their lineage. S. tchadensis does indicate that the last common ancestor of humans and chimpanzees is unlikely to closely resemble extant chimpanzees, as had been previously supposed by some paleontologists. Additionally, with the significant sexual dimorphism known to have existed in early hominins, the difference between Ardipithecus and Sahelanthropus may not be large enough to warrant a separate genus for the latter.

== Anatomy ==
=== Cranium ===
Toumaï skull from different angles

Existing fossils include a relatively small cranium, five pieces of jaw, and some teeth, making up a head that has a mixture of derived and primitive features. A virtual reconstruction of the interior of the braincase indicated a cranial capacity of 378 cm^{3}, similar to that of extant chimpanzees and approximately a third the size of modern human brains.

The teeth, brow ridges, and facial structure differ markedly from those found in modern humans. Cranial features show a flatter face, U-shaped tooth rows, small canines, an anterior foramen magnum, and heavy brow ridges. The only known skull suffered a large amount of distortion during the time of fossilisation and discovery, as the cranium is dorsoventrally flattened, and the right side is depressed.

=== Locomotion ===
In the original description in 2002, Brunet et al. said it "would not be unreasonable" to speculate that Sahelanthropus was capable of maintaining an upright posture while walking bipedally. Because they had not reported any limb bones or other post-cranial material (anything other than the skull), this was based on the reconstructed original orientation of the foramen magnum (where the skull connects the spine), and their classification of Sahelanthropus into Hominina based on facial comparisons (one of the diagnostic characteristics of Hominina is bipedalism). This was soon disputed because the orientation of the foramen magnum is not an entirely conclusive piece of evidence in regard to the question of habitual posture, and the features used to classify Sahelanthropus into Hominina are not entirely unique to Hominina.

In 2020, the femur had been formally described, and the study concluded it was not consistent with habitual bipedalism. In 2022, Daver and colleagues suggested that the ulnar and femoral morphologies do show characteristics consistent with habitual bipedalism. In 2023, however, Meyer and colleagues examined its ulna shaft and argued that Sahelanthropus is not an obligate biped based on the mathematical analysis of its locomotor behavior, which indicated that its forelimbs had different functions compared to modern humans and hominins, and that it probably walked on its knuckles like modern gorillas and chimpanzees, so more examination is required to truly identify its locomotor behavior (i.e. whether it exhibited facultative bipedalism) and its phylogenetic position as a hominin in the evolution of humans. In response to Daver et al. (2022), a 2024 study by Cazenave et al. re-examined postcranial evidence, and concluded that it is not sufficient to determine whether Sahelanthropus was a habitual biped, since none of the features are consistent with or unique to bipedal hominins, but with non-hominin apes or even non-primates. In 2026, Williams and colleagues noted that the limb size and morphology of Sahelanthropus most closely resembles that of the knuckle-walking chimpanzee, but they identified three probable features that are indicative of earliest hominin bipedalism based on 3D geometric morphometrics analyses.

== Palaeoecology ==
Based on dental mesowear patterns of the bovids found in the same palaeoenvironment, S. tchadensis inhabited a mosaic environment with patches of both forests and grasslands.

== See also ==
- Ardipithecus
- Chimpanzee–human last common ancestor
- Human evolution
- List of human evolution fossils (with images)
- Orrorin
- Graecopithecus
