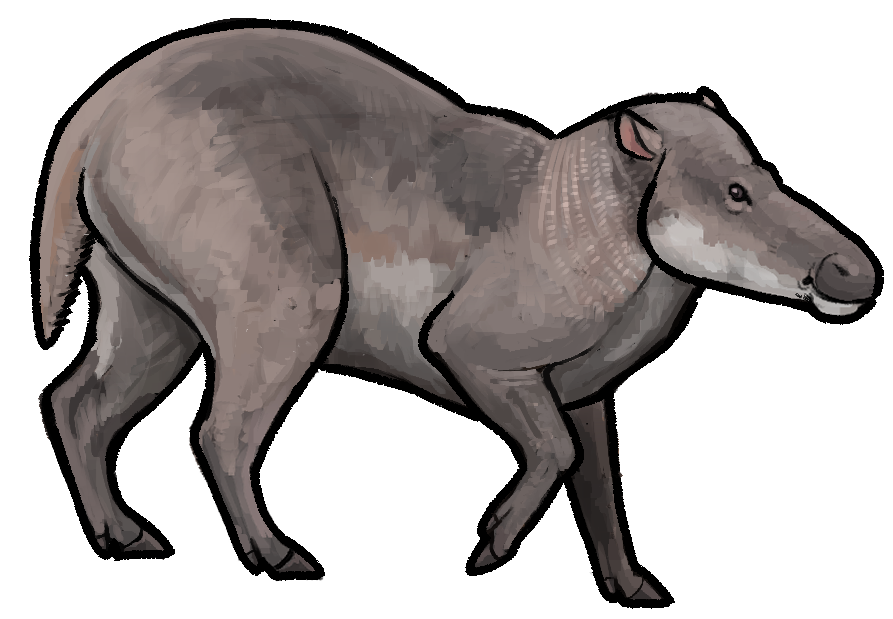
- Elomeryx garbanii

Scientific classification
- Kingdom: Animalia
- Phylum: Chordata
- Class: Mammalia
- Order: Artiodactyla
- Family: †Anthracotheriidae
- Subfamily: †Bothriodontinae
- Genus: †Elomeryx; Marsh, 1894

Type species
- †Elomeryx armatus

Species
- †E. armatus; †E. borbonicus; †E. cluai; †E. crispus; †E. garbanii

= Elomeryx =

Elomeryx Temporal range: Middle Eocene–Early Oligocene

Extinct genus of mammals

Elomeryx is an extinct genus of artiodactyl, and is among the earliest known anthracotheres. The genus was extremely widespread, first being found in Asia in the middle Eocene, in Europe during the latest Eocene, and having spread to North America by the early Oligocene. The closest living relatives of the Elomeryx are thought to be suids, hippopotami, and cetaceans.

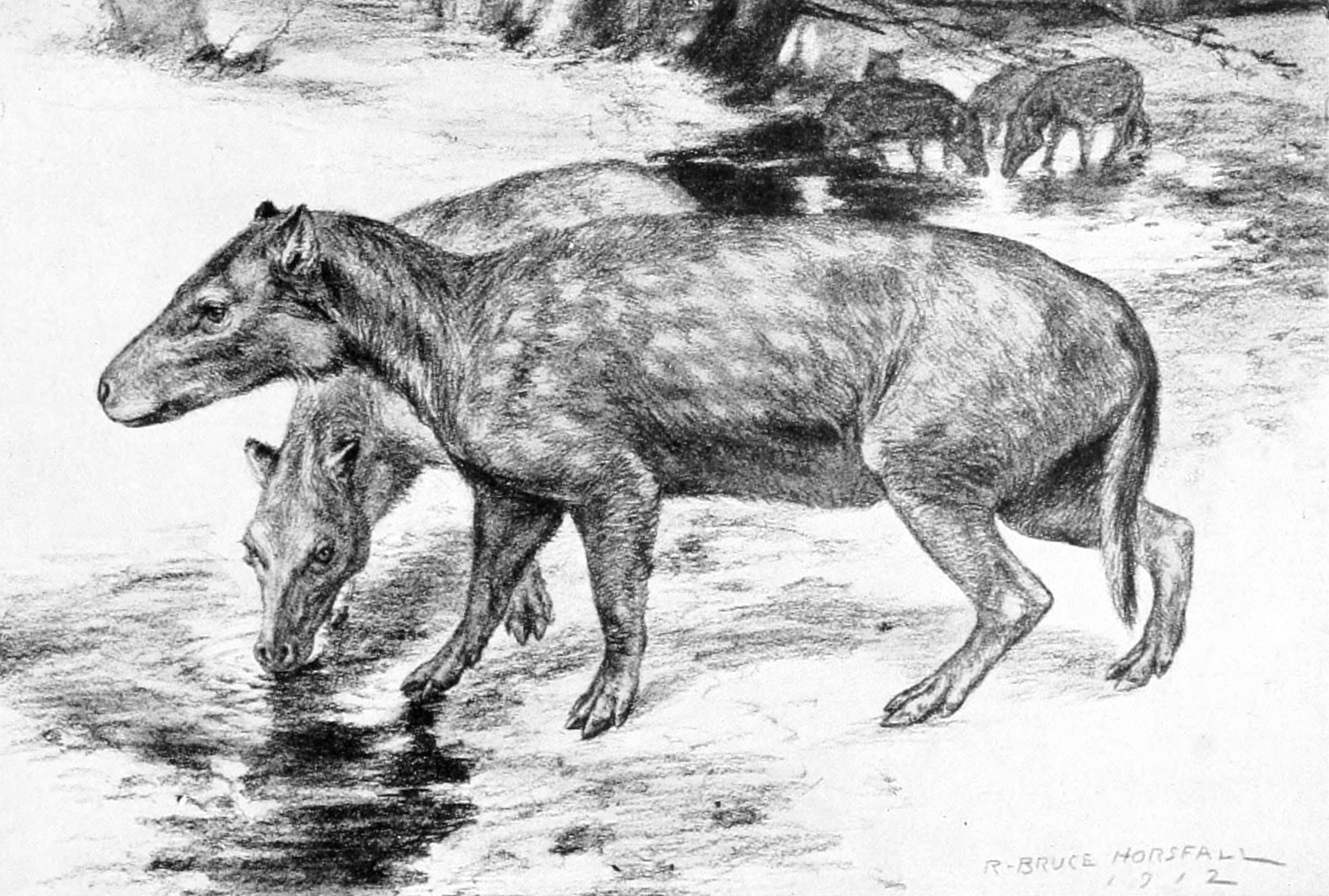
Restoration of E. armatus

Elomeryx was about 1.5 metres (4.9 ft) in body length, and had a long, vaguely horse-like head. It had small tusks which it used to uproot plants, and spoon-shaped incisors ideal for pulling and cropping water plants. Elomeryx had five-toed hind legs and four-toed front legs, resulting in wide feet which made it easier to walk on soft mud. It probably had similar habits to the modern hippopotamus, to which it may have been related.

== Palaeobiology ==
=== Locomotion ===
Based on analysis of the microanatomy of its long bones, Elomeryx borbonicus was fully terrestrial.
