= Djurab Desert =

Desert in Chad

Djurab
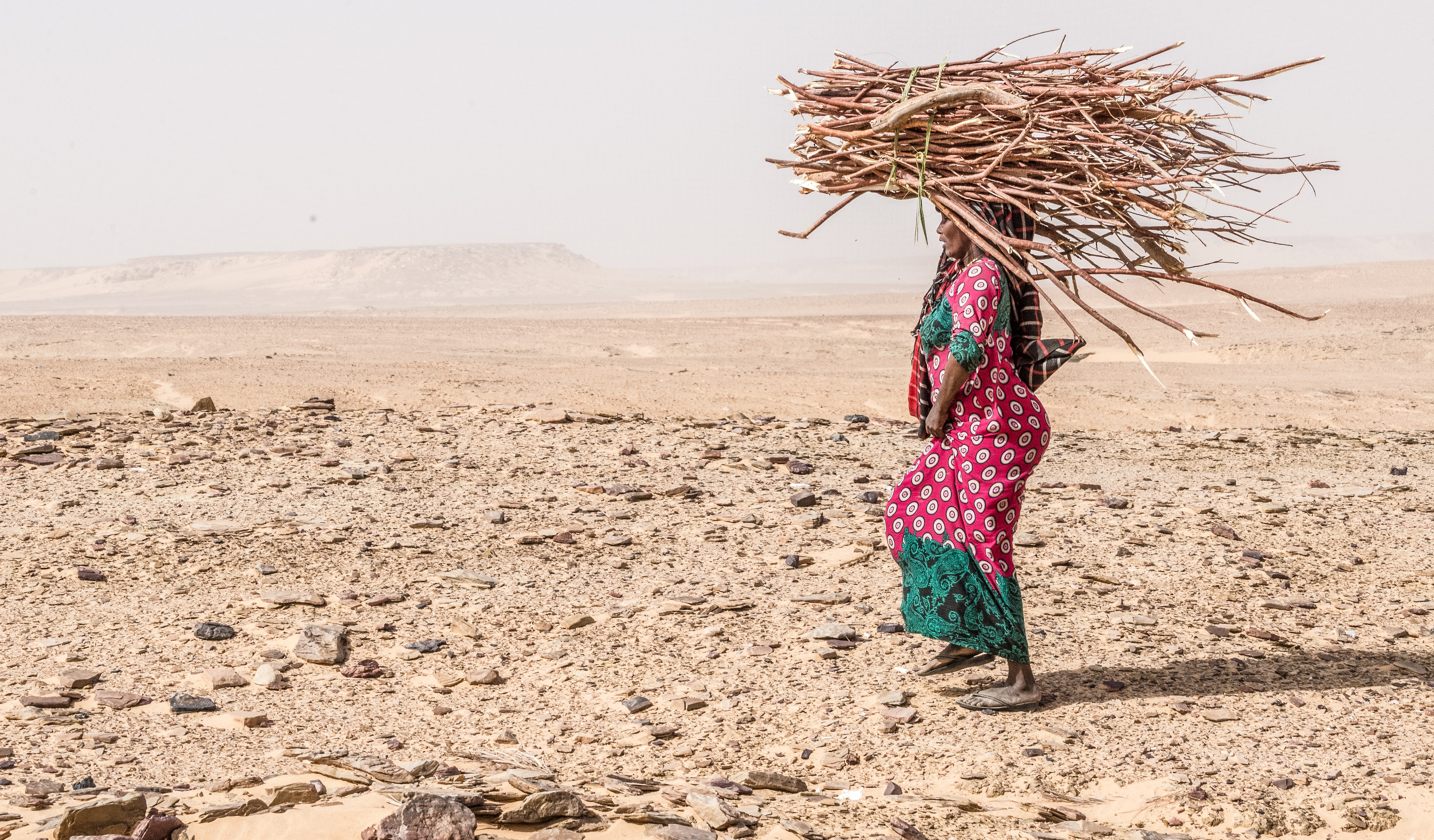
- A woman collects firewood within the Djurab Desert
- Length: 500 km (310 mi)
- Width: 500 km (310 mi)
- Area: 200,000 km^{2} (77,000 mi^{2})

Geology
- Age: 7 Ma

Geography
- Country: Chad
- Coordinates: 17°N 18°E
- Interactive map of Djurab

The Djurab Desert (Djourab, جراب) is a desert in northern Chad. Part of the greater Sahara desert, it makes up much of the area of Chad's Borkou region.

The Koro Toro settlement and maximum security prison is situated on the eastern boundary of the desert. The closest major settlements are Salal to the south and Faya-Largeau to the northeast. To the west is the Ténéré desert (the Erg of Bilma) of western Chad and Niger, to the north are the Tibesti Mountains of the central Sahara.

Aeolian deflation in the northern subbasin formed the desert with arid conditions. Desert reached through Sahara and reduced Lake Chad.

Many fossils have been found in this desert, Kossom Bougoudi and Toros-Menalla being among the most bountiful fossil-bearing areas. A team led by Michel Brunet, from the University of Poitiers, excavated in the Djurab desert during the mid-1990s.

In 2001, the type fossil of Sahelanthropus tchadensis, a hominid species of about 7 million years ago, was discovered at Toros-Menalla (16.25°N 17.5°E, some 100 km north of Salal), at 250 meters above sea level. Michel Brunet, since 1994, has explored Miocene and Pliocene deposits in the desert with the Mission Paléoanthropologique Franco-Tchadienne, which are located in a basin which includes Lake Chad. In the period of the Sahelanthropus tchadensis, desert would have long dry season, and fruits would have been able to grow at certain times of the year.

== Bibliography ==
- Henke, Winfried; Tattersall, Ian (2007). Handbook of Paleoanthropology: Vol I:Principles, Methods and Approaches Vol II:Primate Evolution and Human Origins Vol III:Phylogeny of Hominids. Springer Science & Business Media. p. 2069. ISBN 9783540324744.
- Sarmiento, Esteban E.; Sawyer, Gary J.; Milner, Richard; Deak, Viktor (2007). "We Were Not Alone". In Tattersall, Ian (ed.). The Last Human: A Guide to Twenty-two Species of Extinct Humans. Yale University Press. p. 29. ISBN 9780300100471.
