= Abel (hominid) =

Hominin fossil

Abel (KT-12/H1) is the name given to the only known specimen of Australopithecus bahrelghazali. Abel was found in January 1995 in Chad in the Kanem Region by the paleontologist Michel Brunet, who named the fossil "Abel" in memory of his close friend Abel Brillanceau, who had died of malaria in 1989. The name "bahrelghazali" is in reference to the Bahr el Ghazal valley in Chad where it was discovered.

Abel has been dated to be approximately 3.6 million years old.

The only part of Abel remaining is a piece of the jaw, which contains one incisor, both lower canines, and all three premolars. The small amount of material makes it difficult to determine the exact relationship Au. bahrelghazali had to other early humans. The few teeth available have led researchers to believe it is of the genus Australopithecus, with many similarities to Australopithecus afarensis. While some believe this means Abel belongs to Au. afarensis, it was found more than 1,500 miles west of any other Au. afarensis specimens. Other traits such as three-rooted premolars, a flat mental surface of the jaw, and incisiform canines are considered by some a distinct enough combination to interpret A. bahrelghazali as a distinct species. Others, though, consider these traits to be regional differences in Au. afarensis.

Based on Abel's teeth, researchers have found that Au. bahrelghazali would have eaten grasses, sedges, and grassland plants rich in the C4 isotope. This points to early hominids having broad diets; capable of eating whatever food was locally available to them.

== See also ==
- List of human evolution fossils
