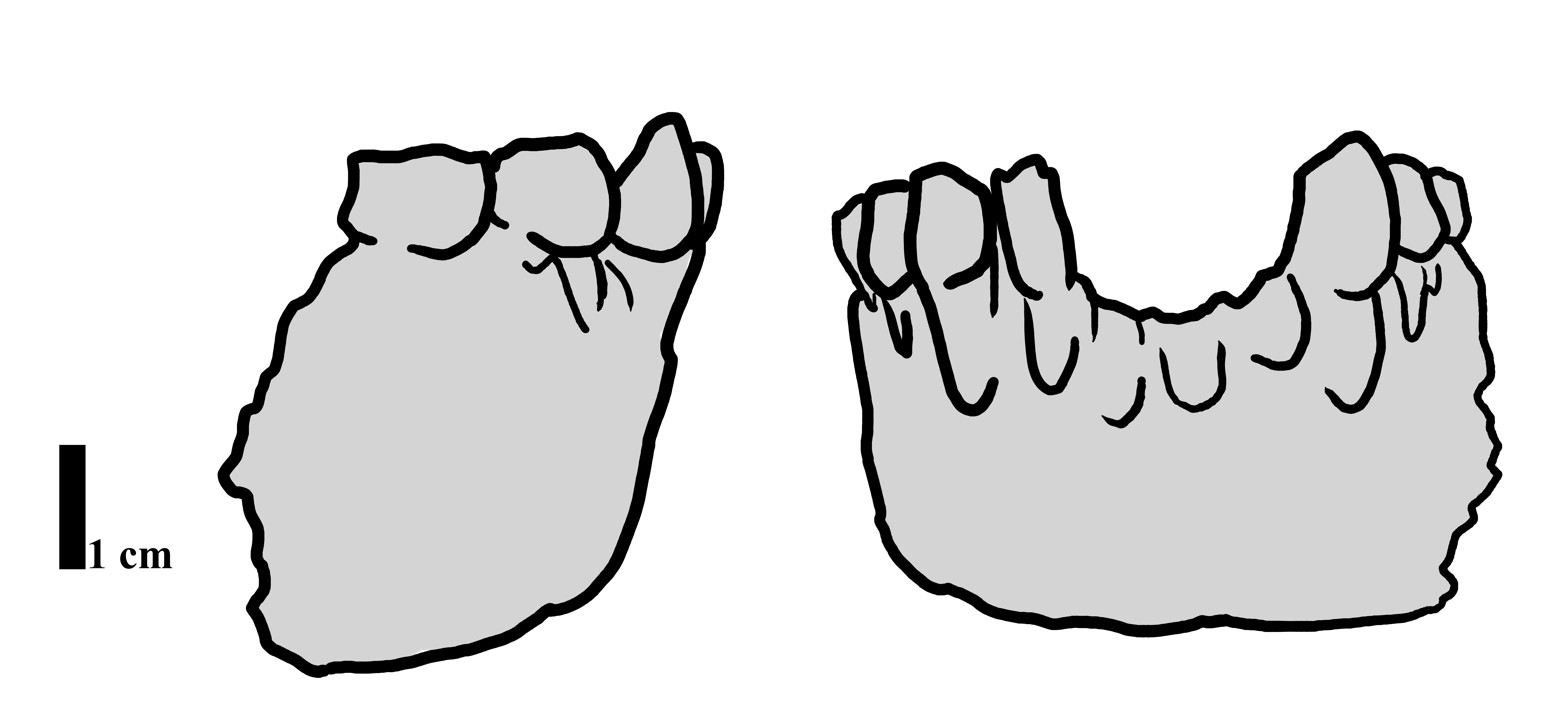
- Illustration of the holotype KT12/H1 ("Abel")

Scientific classification
- Kingdom: Animalia
- Phylum: Chordata
- Class: Mammalia
- Order: Primates
- Suborder: Haplorhini
- Family: Hominidae
- Genus: †Australopithecus
- Species: †A. bahrelghazali

Binomial name
- †Australopithecus bahrelghazali Brunet et al., 1995

Synonyms
- Praeanthropus bahrelghazali

= Australopithecus bahrelghazali =

Australopithecus bahrelghazali Temporal range: Piacenzian 3.6/3.5–3 Ma

Extinct species of hominin from 3.5 mya

Australopithecus bahrelghazali is an extinct species of australopithecine discovered in 1995 at Koro Toro, Bahr el Gazel, Chad, existing around 3.5 million years ago in the Pliocene. It is the first and only australopithecine known from Central Africa, and demonstrates that this group was widely distributed across Africa as opposed to being restricted to East and southern Africa as previously thought. The validity of A. bahrelghazali has not been widely accepted, in favour of classifying the specimens as A. afarensis, a better known Pliocene australopithecine from East Africa, because of the anatomical similarity and the fact that A. bahrelghazali is known only from 3 partial jawbones and an isolated premolar. The specimens inhabited a lakeside grassland environment with sparse tree cover, possibly similar to the modern Okavango Delta, and similarly predominantly ate C_{4} savanna foods—such as grasses, sedges, storage organs, or rhizomes—and to a lesser degree also C_{3} forest foods—such as fruits, flowers, pods, or insects. However, the teeth seem ill-equipped to process C_{4} plants, so its true diet is unclear.

== Research history ==
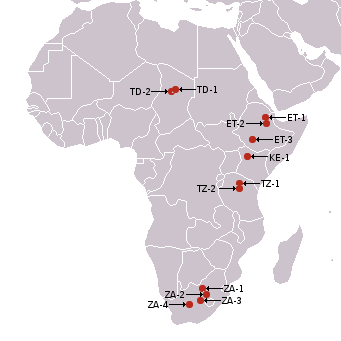
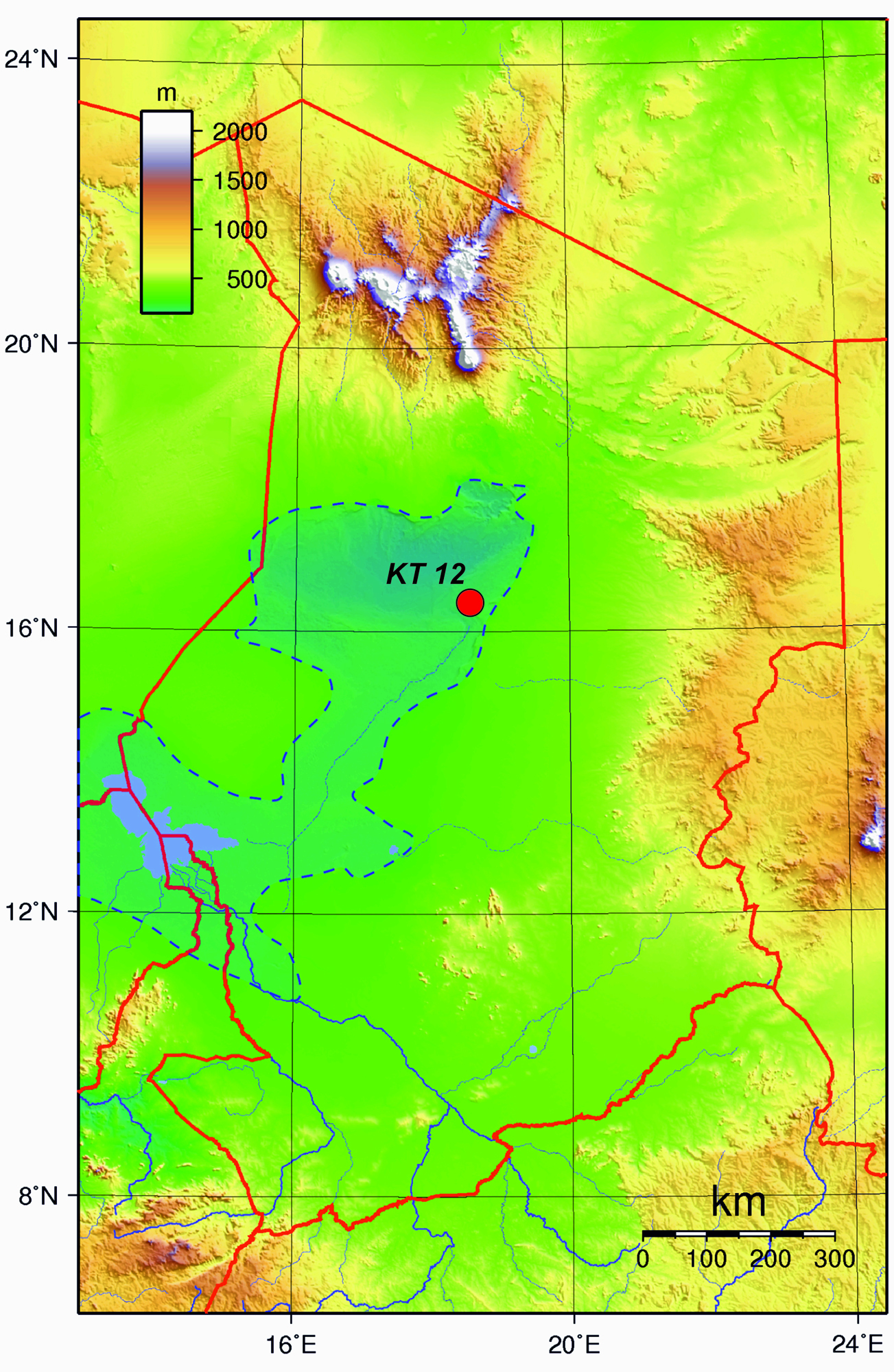
Australopithecus locations (left) and within Chad with Lake Mega-Chad outlined (right)

In 1995, two specimens were recovered from Koro Toro, Bahr el Gazel, Chad: KT12/H1 or "Abel" (a jawbone preserving the premolars, canines, and the right second incisor) and KT12/H2 (an isolated first upper premolar). They were discovered by the Franco-Chadian Paleoanthropological Mission, and reported by French palaeontologist Michel Brunet, French geographer Alain Beauvilain, French anthropologist Yves Coppens, French palaeontologist Emile Heintz, Chadian geochemist engineer Aladji Hamit Elimi Ali Moutaye, and British palaeoanthropologist David Pilbeam. Based on the wildlife assemblage, the remains were roughly dated to the middle to late Pliocene 3.5–3 million years ago; consequently, the describers decided to preliminarily assign the remains to Australopithecus afarensis, which inhabited Ethiopia during that time period, barring more detailed anatomical comparisons. In 1996, they allocated it to a new species, A. bahrelghazali, naming it after the region; Bahr el Gazel means "River of the Gazelles" in classical Arabic. They denoted KT12/H1 as the holotype and KT12/H2 a paratype. Another jawbone was discovered at the K13 site in 1997, and a third from the KT40 site.

In 2008, a pelite (a type of sedimentary rock) recovered from the same sediments as Abel was radiometrically dated (using the ^{10}Be/^{9}Be ratio) to have been deposited 3.58 million years ago. However, Beauvilain responded that Abel was not found in situ but at the edge of a shallow gulley, and it is impossible to figure out from what stratigraphic section the specimen (or any other fossil from Koro Toro) was first deposited in, in order to accurately radiometrically date it. Nonetheless, Abel was redated in 2010 using the same methods to about 3.65 million years ago, and Brunet agreed with an age of roughly 3.5 million years ago.

A. bahrelghazali was the first australopithecine recovered from Central Africa, and disproved the earlier notion that they were restricted to east of the eastern branch of the East African Rift which formed in the Late Miocene. Koro Toro is situated about 2,500 km (1,600 mi) from the Rift Valley, and the remains suggest australopithecines were widely distributed in grassland and woodland zones across the continent. The lack of other Central and West African australopithecines may be due to sampling bias, as similarly aged fossil-bearing sediments are more or less unknown beyond East Africa. The ancestors of A. bahrelghazali may have left East Africa via the Central African Shear Zone. In 2014, the first australopithecine in the western branch of the East African Rift was reported in Ishango, Democratic Republic of the Congo.

At present, the classification of Australopithecus and Paranthropus species is in disarray. Australopithecus is considered a grade taxon whose members are united by their similar physiology rather than how close they are to each other in the hominin family tree. In an attempt to resolve this, in 2003, Spanish writer Camilo José Cela Conde and evolutionary biologist Francisco J. Ayala proposed splitting off the genus "Praeanthropus" and including A. bahrelghazali alongside Sahelanthropus (the only other fossil ape known from Chad), A. anamensis, A. afarensis, and A. garhi.

The validity of A. bahrelghazali has not been widely accepted given how few remains there are and how similar they are to A. afarensis.

African Hominin timeline

== Anatomy ==
Hominin timeline
← / Earlier apes; ← / Gorilla split; ← / Chimpanzee split; ← / Earliest bipedal; ← / Earliest sign of Ardipithecus; ← / Earliest sign of Australopithecus; ← / Earliest stone tools; ← / Earliest sign of Homo; ← / Dispersal beyond Africa; ← / Earliest fire / cooking; ← / Earliest rock art; ← / Earliest clothes; ← / Modern humans
(million years ago)

The teeth of KT12/H1 are quite similar to the jawbone of A. afarensis, with large and incisor-like canines and bicuspid premolars (as opposed to molar-like premolars). Unlike A. afarensis, the alveolar part of the jawbone where the tooth sockets are is almost vertical as opposed to oblique, possesses poorly developed superior transverse torus and moderate inferior torus (two ridges on the midline of the jaw on the tongue side), and thin enamel on the chewing surface of the premolars. Brunet and colleagues had listed the presence of 3 distinct tooth roots as a distinguishing characteristic, but the third premolar of the A. afarensis LH-24 specimen from Middle Awash, Ethiopia, was described in 2000 as having the same feature, which shows that premolar anatomy was highly variable for A. afarensis. The mandibular symphysis (at the midline of the jaw) of KT40, especially, as well as KT12/H1 have the same dimensions as the symphysis of A. afarensis, though theirs is relatively thick compared to the height.

== Palaeoecology ==
Carbon isotope analysis has shown that A. bahrelghazali had high δ^{13}C values. This indicates a diet of predominantly C_{4} savanna foods, such as grasses, sedges, underground storage organs (USOs), or rhizomes. There is a smaller C_{3} portion which may have comprised more typical ape food items such as fruits, flowers, pods, or insects. This indicates that, like contemporary and future australopiths, A. bahrelghazali was capable of exploiting whatever food was abundant in its environment, whereas most primates (including savanna chimps) avoid C_{4} foods. However, despite 55–80% of δ^{13}C deriving from C_{4} sources similar to Paranthropus boisei and the modern gelada (and considerably more than any tested A. afarensis population), A. bahrelghazali lacks the specialisations for such a diet. Because the teeth are not hypsodont, it could not have chewed large quantities of grass, and because the enamel is so thin, the teeth would not have been able to withstand the abrasive dirt particles of USOs. In regard to C_{4} sources, chimps and bonobos (which have even thinner enamel) consume plant medullas as a fallback food and sedges as an important energy and protein source; however a sedge-based diet likely could not have sustained A. bahrelghazali.

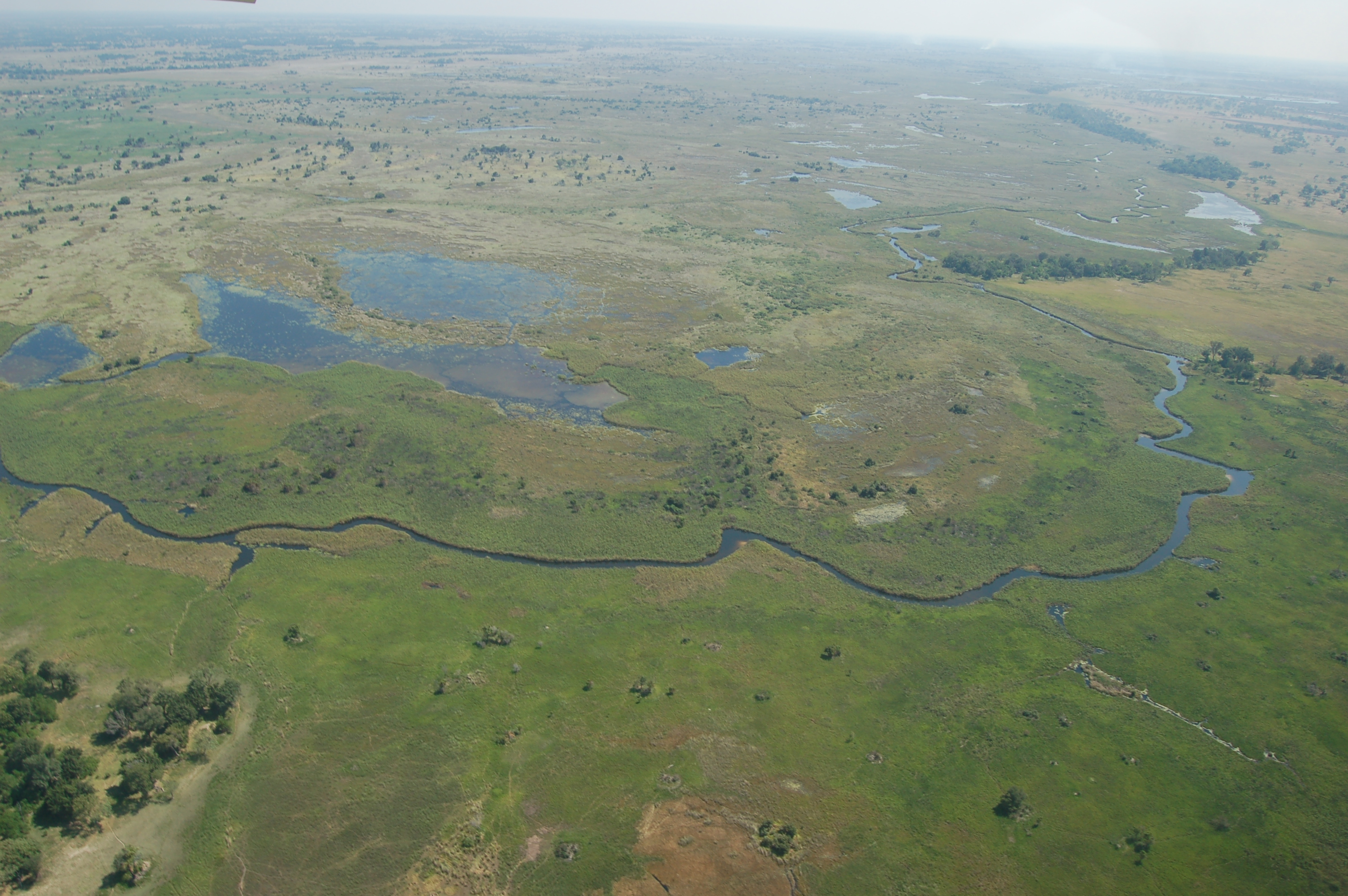
Koro Toro may have been similar to the modern Okavango Delta (above)

During the Pliocene around the expanded Lake Chad (or "Lake Mega-Chad"), insect trace fossils indicate this was a well-vegetated region, and the abundance of rhizomes may suggest a seasonal climate with wet and dry seasons. Koro Toro has yielded several large mammals, including several antelopes, of which some were endemic, the elephant Loxodonta exoptata, the white rhinoceros Ceratotherium praecox, the pig Kolpochoerus afarensis, a Hipparion horse, a Sivatherium, and a giraffe. Some of these are also known from Pliocene East African sites, implying that animals could freely migrate between east and west of the Great African Rift. The K13 site features, in regard to bovids, an abundance of Reduncinae, Alcelaphinae, and Antilopinae, whereas Tragelaphini is much rarer, which indicates an open environment which was drier than Pliocene East African sites. In total, the area seems to have been predominantly grasslands with some tree cover. In addition, the area featured aquatic creatures, predominantly catfish, and also 10 other kinds of fish, the hippo Hexaprotodon protamphibius, an otter, a Geochelone tortoise, a Trionyx softshell turtle, a false gharial, and an anatid waterbird. These aquatic animals indicate Koro Toro had open-water lakes or streams with swampy grassy margins, connected to the Nilo-Sudan waterways (including the Nile, Chari, Niger, Senegal, Volta, and Gambia Rivers). Koro Toro, during Mega-Chad events (which have been cyclical for the last 7 million years), may have been similar to the modern Okavango Delta.

== See also ==
- African archaeology
- Ardipithecus ramidus
- Australopithecus anamensis
- Australopithecus afarensis
- Australopithecus deyiremeda
- Kenyanthropus
- List of fossil sites (with link directory)
- List of human evolution fossils (with images)
