= Nacholameryx =

Nacholameryx Temporal range: Langhian

Scientific classification
- Kingdom: Animalia
- Phylum: Chordata
- Class: Mammalia
- Order: Artiodactyla
- Family: †Anthracotheriidae
- Tribe: †Merycopotamini
- Genus: †Nacholameryx
- Species: †N. baragoiensis

Binomial name
- †Nacholameryx baragoiensis Tsubamoto et al., 2025

Extinct genus of artiodactyl

Nacholameryx is an extinct monotypic genus of merycopotamin anthracotheriid that lived in Kenya during the Langhian stage of the Miocene epoch.

== Etymology ==
The generic name Nacholameryx references the locality of Nachola, where the fossil was found, and the Greek word meryx, meaning ruminant. The specific epithet is in reference to the town of Baragoi, located in close proximity to the fossil site of Nachola.
