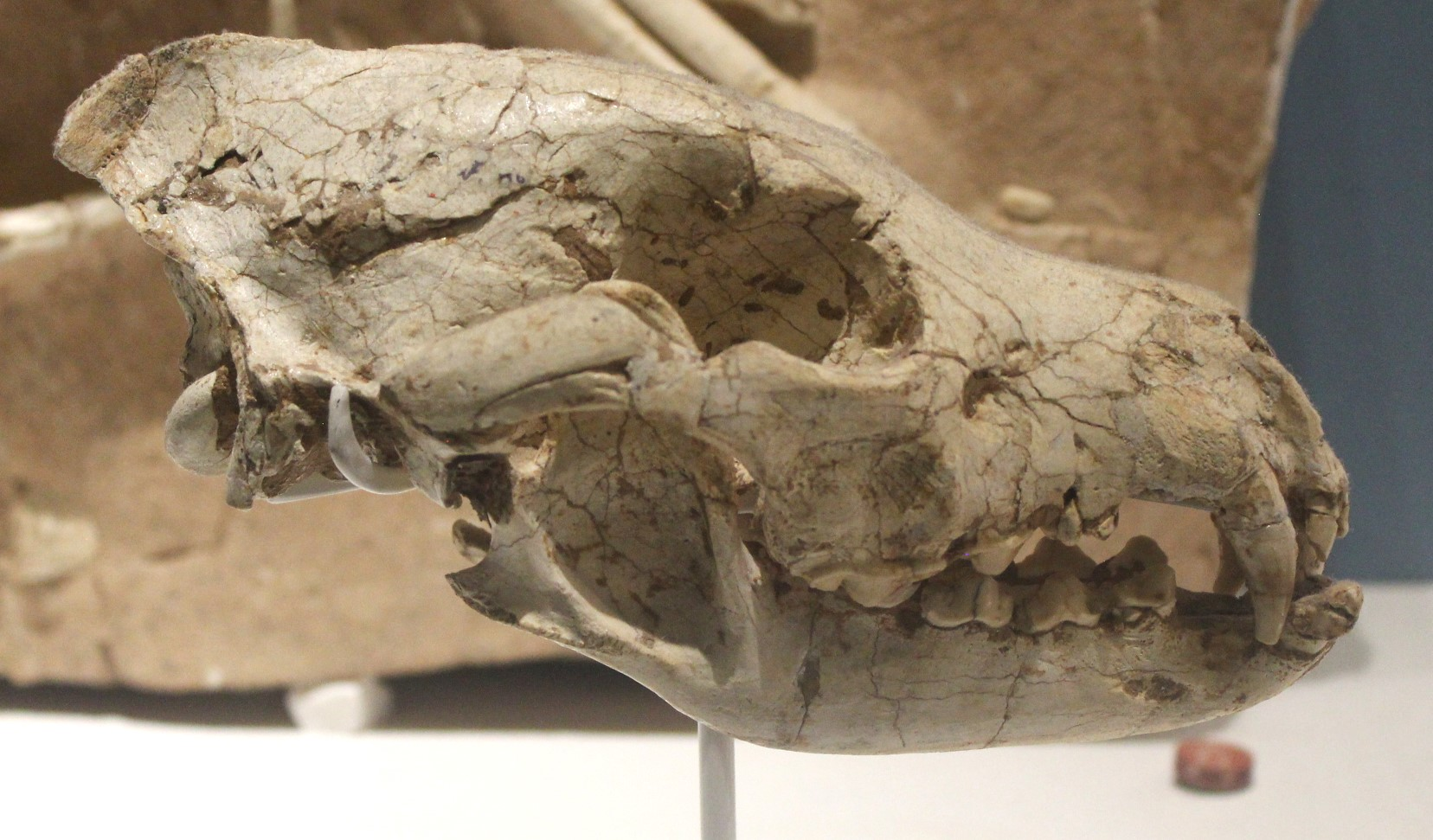
- Skull on display at the National Natural History Museum of China

Scientific classification
- Kingdom: Animalia
- Phylum: Chordata
- Class: Mammalia
- Order: Carnivora
- Family: Hyaenidae
- Subfamily: †Ictitheriinae
- Genus: †Thalassictis; Nordmann, 1850

Type species
- †Thalassictis robusta Gervais, 1850

Other species
- †T. certa Major, 1903; †T. sarmatica Pavlov, 1908; †T. proava Pilgrim, 1910; †T. montadai Villalta & Pairó, 1943; †T. spelaea Semenov, 1988

Synonyms
- Genus synonymy: Palhyaena Gervois, 1859; Miohyaena Kretzoi, 1939; Species synonymy: T. robusta: Ictitherium robustum Kretzoi, 1938; T. certa: Prognetta incerta Depéret, 1982; Prognetta certa Major, 1903; Miohyaena certa Kretzoi, 1938; T. sarmatica: Ictitherium sarmaticum Pavlov, 1908; T. proava: Palhyaena proava Pilgrim, 1910; Prognetta proava Pilgrim, 1913; Lycyaena? proava Pilgrim, 1932; Lycyaena? chinjiensis Pilgrim, 1935; Hyaenictitherium proavum Kretzoi, 1938; Miohyaena chinjiensis Kretzoi, 1938; Miohyaena proava De Vos, Leinders & Hussain, 1987; Thalassictis chinjiensis Werdelin, 1988; T. montadai: Ictitherium montadai Villalta & Pairó, 1943; Prognetta aff. montadai Viret, 1951; Prognetta montadai Pairó & Petter, 1969; Miohyaena montadai Schmidt-Kittler, 1976; T. spelaea: Ictitherium spelaeum Semenov, 1988

= Thalassictis =

Thalassictis Temporal range: Middle Miocene–Late Miocene (Astaracian to Vallesian)

Extinct genus of carnivores

Thalassictis is an extinct genus of terrestrial carnivore in the family Hyaenidae that lived in Asia during the Middle to Late Miocene and in Europe and North Africa during the Late Miocene. Thalassictis may be paraphyletic.

== Discovery ==
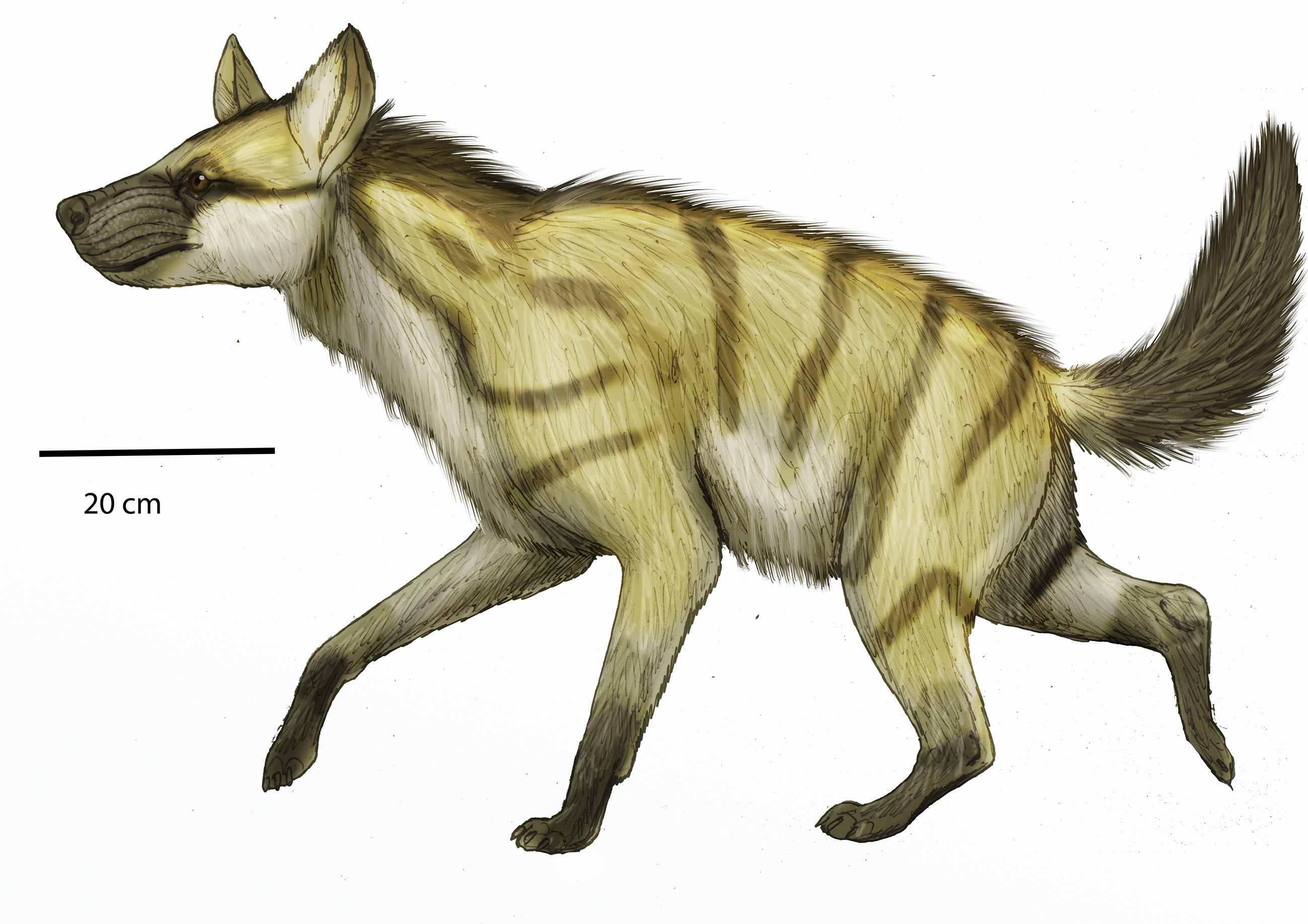
T. hyaenoides life restoration

Thalassictis was named by Nordmann (1850) [in Gervais ]. Its type is Thalassictis robusta. It was assigned to Hyaenidae by Kurtén (1982) and Flynn (1998).
