= Michel Brunet (paleontologist) =

French paleontologist and professor (born 1940)

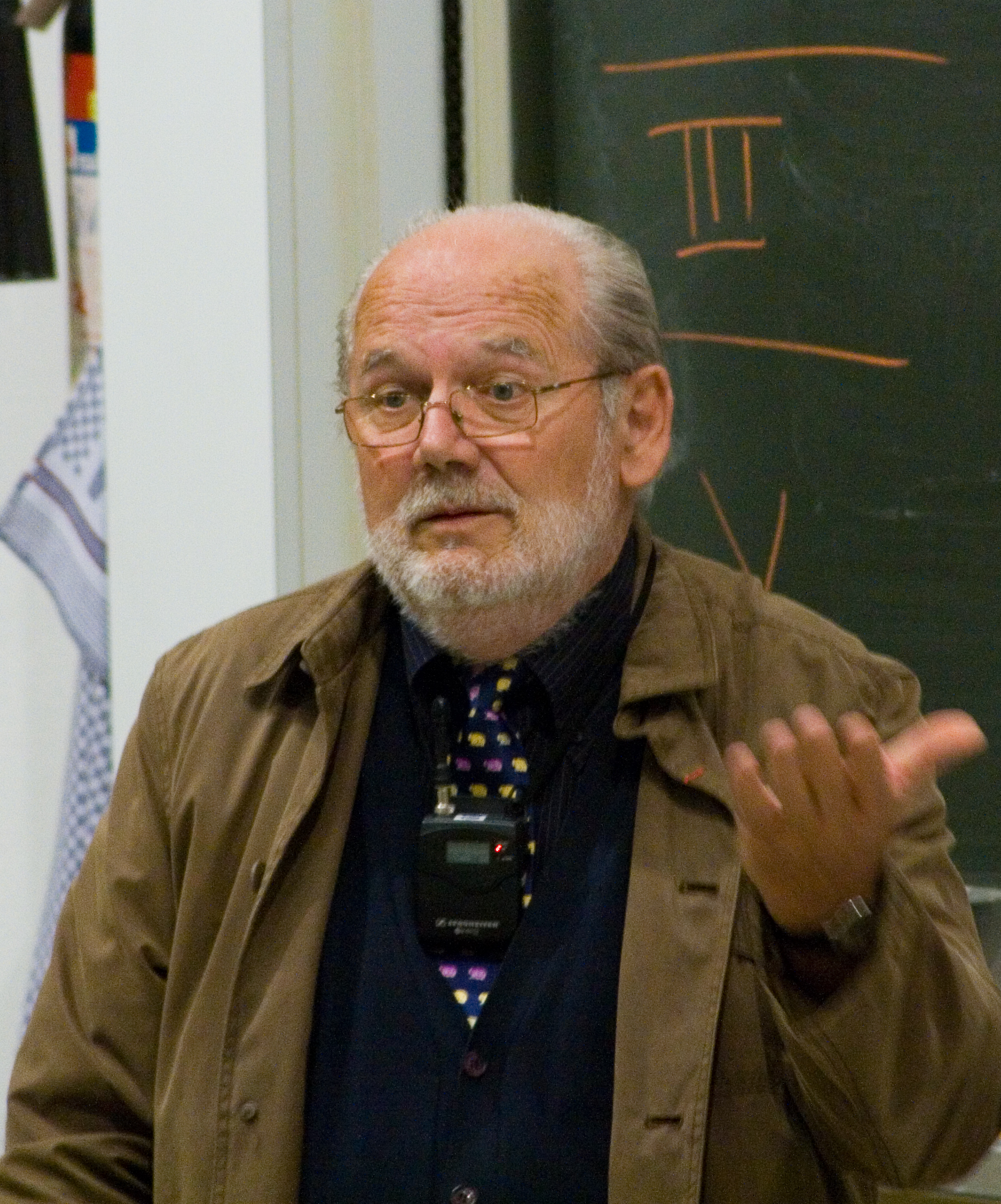
Brunet in 2008

Michel Brunet (born April 6, 1940) is a French paleontologist and a professor at the Collège de France between 2008 and 2011. In 2001 Brunet announced the discovery in Central Africa of the skull and jaw remains of a late Miocene hominid nicknamed Toumaï. These remains may predate the earliest previously known hominid remains, Lucy, by over three million years; however, this conclusion is the subject of a significant controversy.

== Biography ==
Brunet was born in 1940 in Magné, in the historic region of Poitou. After having passed his first years in the countryside, at 8 he moved with his family to Versailles. He took a Ph.D. in paleontology at the Sorbonne and then became Professor of Vertebrate paleontology at the University of Poitiers, specializing in hoofed mammals.

A turning point in Brunet's career was when he heard that paleoanthropologist David Pilbeam was searching for fossil apes in Pakistan and the ancestors of the hominids. This spurred Brunet to form with his colleague Emile Heintz a team with the idea of also searching for extinct apes across the border from Pakistan in Afghanistan. The expedition was unsuccessful, and no fossil apes were found.

In the 1980s Brunet and Pilbeam matched together and moved to Africa. Their idea was to verify the theory of Yves Coppens that hominids had first rose in the savannas of Eastern Africa. The two paleontologists idea was that the shores of Lake Chad were particularly indicated to work as a magnet for mammals, and maybe also hominids. In 1984 searching begun in Cameroon, but the nine field seasons spent there were discouraging, with no hominids found.

A new opportunity presented itself to Brunet when the government of Chad gave him the permission to conduct researches in the Djurab Desert, that due to the Chadian Civil War had long been closed to foreigners. Brunet promptly formed the French-Chadian Paleoanthropological Mission (Mission Paléoanthropologique Franco-Tchadienne or MPFT) a Franco-Chadian scientific alliance that united the University of Poitiers, the University of N'Djamena and the Centre Nationale d'Appui à la Recherche (CNAR).

The area proved itself to be a site rich in fossils, and expeditions headed by Brunet have collected over 8000 of them, including hominid remains. On January 23, 1995 he spotted a jawbone 3.5 million years old, that he classified as a new species of Australopithecine, the Australopithecus bahrelghazali. Informally he called it Abel, as a tribute to his dead friend Abel Brillanceau. Abel was the first fossil hominid found in Western Africa, radically transforming the discussions on early hominid distribution, that until this discovery was thought to center only in Southern and especially Eastern Africa.

While much discussed, a yet more important find was to be made by Brunet's team on July 19, 2001; a Chadian student of the mission, Ahounta Djimdoumalbaye, unearthed a nearly complete cranium, from 6 to 7 million years old, nicknamed Toumaï by the Chadian President Idriss Déby, and classified by Brunet as the first exemplary of the Sahelanthropus tchadensis. Brunet and others, like Tim White, are strongly convinced Toumai to be a hominid, though this is contested by colleagues like Milford Wolpoff, who instead believe it to be an ape. Other experts, like Chris Stringer, argued it was inconclusive where the Sahelanthropus belongs in the human evolutionary line. Brunet has argued that further excavations have uncovered additional remains which further confirm that Sahelanthropus was a hominid, though his conclusions with these newer findings are also debated by some scientists.

A left femur and two forearm bones were also discovered, but for some reason, Brunet never published anything on them and few other researchers had access to the bones. In a recent paper, Roberto Macchiarelli and colleagues showed this partial left femur (TM 266-01-063) that was recovered at the same location of Sahelanthropus tchadensis, is most probably belongs to this hominin. This team maintains this thigh bone, curved like an ape, was intentionally left unexamined because it would have discredited the theory he walked on two feet. Therefore this femur proves that Toumai didn’t stand erect and he was more like a chimpanzee.

The discovery brought Brunet worldwide recognition in the field of paleoanthropology; and in 2003 he was awarded the Dan David Prize, a prize given to those whose achievements help better understand the world, or affect it.

== See also ==
- List of fossil sites (with link directory)
- List of hominina (hominid) fossils (with images)
- Sahelanthropus tchadensis
