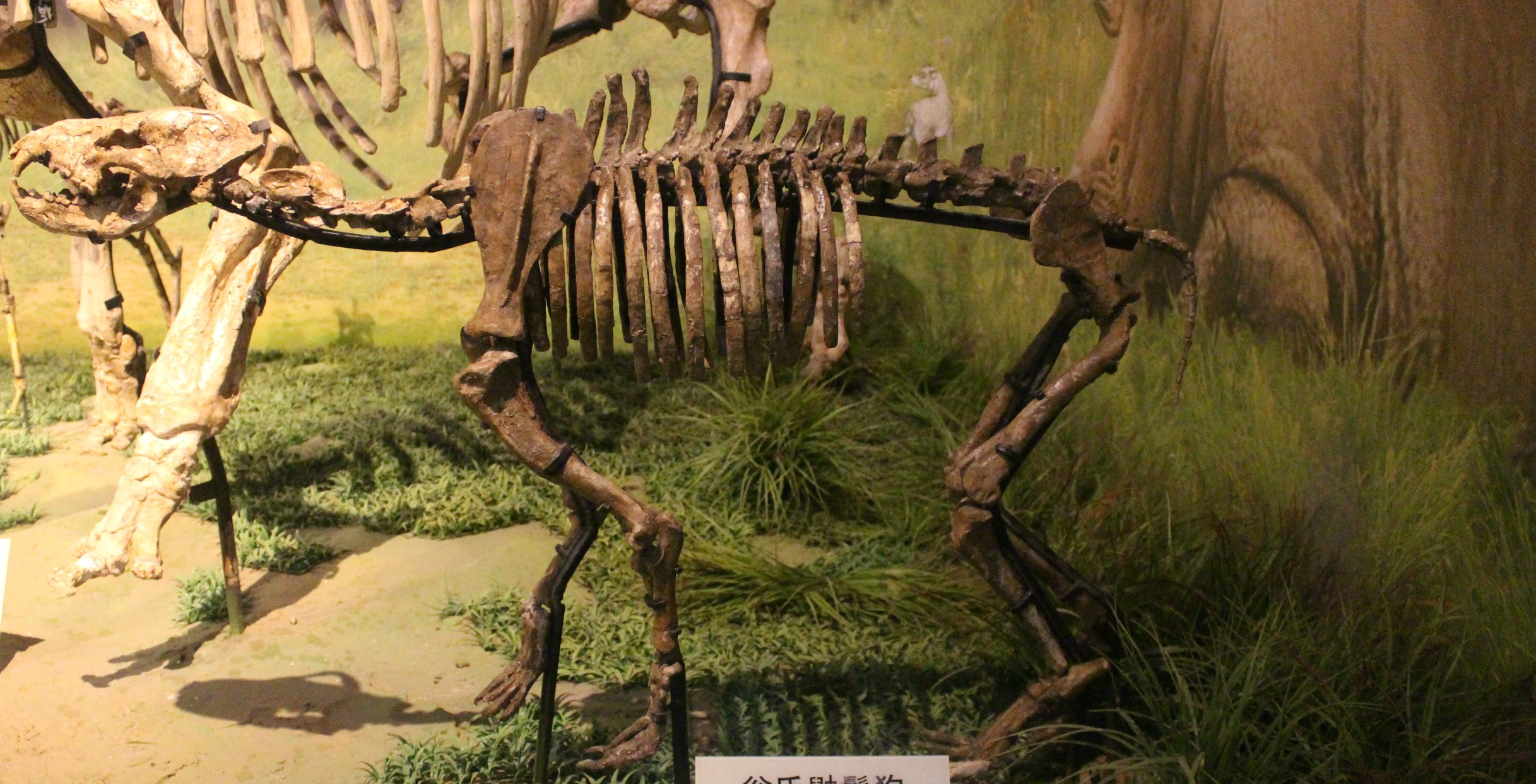
- Skeletal mount, Tianjin Natural History Museum

Scientific classification
- Kingdom: Animalia
- Phylum: Chordata
- Class: Mammalia
- Order: Carnivora
- Family: Hyaenidae
- Subfamily: †Ictitheriinae
- Genus: †Ictitherium; Wagner, 1848

Type species
- †Ictitherium viverrinum Roth & Wagner, 1854

Species
- †I. tauricum Borissiak, 1915; †I. pannonicum Kretzoi, 1952; †I. intuberculatum Ozansoy, 1965; †I. ibericum Meladze, 1967; †I. kurteni Werdelin, 1988

Synonyms
- Genus synonymy: Paraictitherium Ducrotay, 1903; Leptohyaena Depéret, 1914; Sinictitherium Zhongjian, 1937; Galeotherium Wagner, 1840; Species synonymy: I. viverrinum: Galeotherium gen. nov. Wagner, 1840; Ictitherium robustum (Nadmann, 1859) Gaudry, 1862; Thalassictis gracilis Hensel, 1862; Thalassictis viverrina (Roth & Wagner, 1852) Hensel, 1862; Ictitherium gaudryi Zdansky, 1924; Ictitherium sinense Zdansky, 1924; Palhyaena? gaudryi Zdansky, 1938; Sinictitherium sinense Kretzoi, 1938; I. tauricum: Protictitherium? tauricum (Borissiak, 1915) Schmidt-Kittler, 1976; Protictitherium crassum Depéret, 1976; I. pannonicum: Palhyaena hungarica Kretzoi, 1938; Ictitherium cf. robustum Nordmann, 1952; Thalassictis aff. hipparionum (Gervais, 1846) Adrover et al., 1986; I. ibericum: Melinae gen. Meladze, 1967

= Ictitherium =

Ictitherium Temporal range: Late Miocene (Vallesian to Turolian)

Extinct genus of carnivores

Ictitherium (meaning "weasel beast") is an extinct genus belonging to the family Hyaenidae and the subfamily Ictitheriinae erected by Trouessart in 1897. Ictitherium lived throughout Eurasia during the Late Miocene.

== Description ==
Ictitherium were mid-sized gracile hyenas around 1.2 metres (4 ft) long. Their morphology is convergent with that of the maned wolf, with long, stilt-like gracile legs that likely helped it stride through the tall grass of the savannas and grasslands it inhabited.

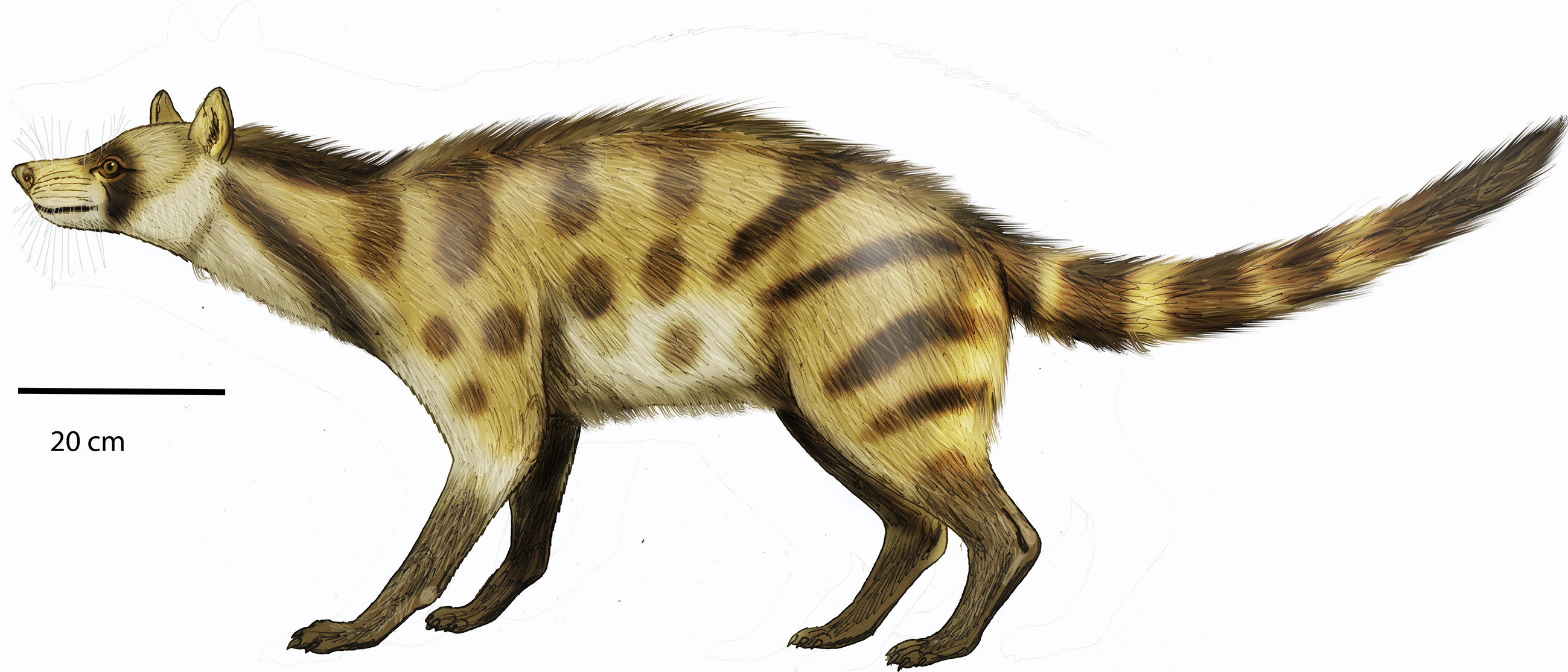
I. viverrinum life restoration

== Palaeoecology ==
It is speculated that I. viverrinum was an opportunistic feeder, and that it ate plants as well as medium-small mammals and birds. It would have consumed bone, as its teeth were much more suited for osteophagy than more basal hyaenids because its Hunter-Schreger bands (HSBs) were zigzag throughout the enamel with the exception of the cervix. I. viverrinum occupied a similar ecological niche as and competed with Hyaenictitherium wongii. Ictitherium was a very successful and abundant genus, with multiple fossils often being found at a single site. Based on studies of its limb morphology, it likely stalked through tall grass on its stilt-like legs, searching for prey before pouncing much like the modern maned wolf.
