= Hyaenictitherium =

Hyaenictitherium Temporal range: Late Miocene to Pliocene (Turolian to Ruscinian) Vallesian if Hyaenotherium is included
- Fossil skeleton of H. hyaenoides at the Shanghai Natural History Museum

Scientific classification
- Kingdom: Animalia
- Phylum: Chordata
- Class: Mammalia
- Order: Carnivora
- Family: Hyaenidae
- Subfamily: †Ictitheriinae
- Genus: †Hyaenictitherium; Kretzoi, 1938

Type species
- †Hyaenictitherium hyaenoides Zdansky, 1924

Other species
- †H. parvum (Khomenko, 1914); †H. namaquensis (Stromer, 1931); †H. venator Semenov, 1989; †H. pilgrimi Werdelin & Solounias, 1991; †H. minimum de Bonis et al., 2005; †H. barbarum? Geraads et al., 2010; †H. wongii? (Zdansky, 1914); †H. ebu? (Werdelin, 2003)

Synonyms
- Genus synonymy: Hyaenotherium?; Species synonymy: H. hyaenoides: Palhyaena hipparionum (Gervais, 1846) Kittl, 1887; Ictitherium hipparionum (Gervais, 1846) Sintsov, 1900; Ictitherium hyaenoides Zdansky, 1924; Lycyaena spathulata Qiu, Huang, & Guo, 1979; Thalassictis (Hyaenictitherium) hyaenoides (Zdansky, 1924) Solounias & De Beaumont, 1981; Thalassictis wongii (Zdansky, 1924) Qiu, 1985; Thalassictis hyaenoides (Zdansky, 1924) Werdelin, 1988b; H. parvum: Lycyaena parva Khomenko, 1914; ?Lycyaena parva (Khomenko, 1914) Alekseev, 1915; Hyaenictitherium venator Semenov, 1989; H. namaquensis: Hyaena namaquensis Stromer, 1931; Hyaena sp. B Hendey, 1974; Ictitherium arkesilai Esu & Kotsakis, 1980; H. pilgrimi: Hyaena sivalensis Lydekker, 1884; Palhyaena indica Pilgrim, 1910; Palhyaena cf. hipparionum (Gervais, 1846) Pilgrim, 1913; Ictitherium indicum (Pilgrim, 1910) Pilgrim, 1932; Hyaenictitherium indicum (Pilgrim, 1910) Kretzoi, 1938; Thalassictis indicum (Pilgrim, 1910) De Vos, Leinders & Hussain, 1987; 'Ictitherium' indicum (Pilgrim, 1910) Werdelin, 1988; H. venator: Ictitherium hipparionum (Gervais, 1846) Macarovici, 1957

Extinct genus of carnivores

Hyaenictitherium is an extinct genus of hyaenids that lived throughout Africa, Asia, and possibly Europe during the Late Miocene and Pliocene. The type species, H. hyaenoides, was similar in size to a striped hyena, whereas the smaller H. minimum was close in size to a jackal. Hyaenictitherium may represent a paraphyletic group.

Some authors argue that Hyaenotherium (Semenov, 1989) is a junior synonym of Hyaenictitherium, and that species belonging to this genus (H. wongii and H. ebu) should be included in Hyaenictitherium.

== Taxonomy ==
Hyaenictitherium was erected by Kretzoi (1938) with H. hyaenoides as the type species. H. venator was later described by Semenov (1989). Werdelin & Solounias (1991) in their review of Hyaenidae included H. parvum, H. namaquensis, and H. pilgrimi in this genus. H. minimum was later described by Bonis et al. (2005). H. barbarum was tentatively assigned to Hyaenictitherium by Geraads et al. (2010). Some authors include species assigned to the genus Hyaenotherium, including H. wongii and H. ebu, under Hyaenictitherium.

== Palaeobiology ==
=== Diet ===
H. wongii was well adapted for durophagy, and it had an ecological niche very similar to Ictitherium viverrinum, with which it competed.

=== Locomotion ===
The limbs of H. wongii were long, indicating that it was a cursorial animal adapted for fast locomotion in open environments.
