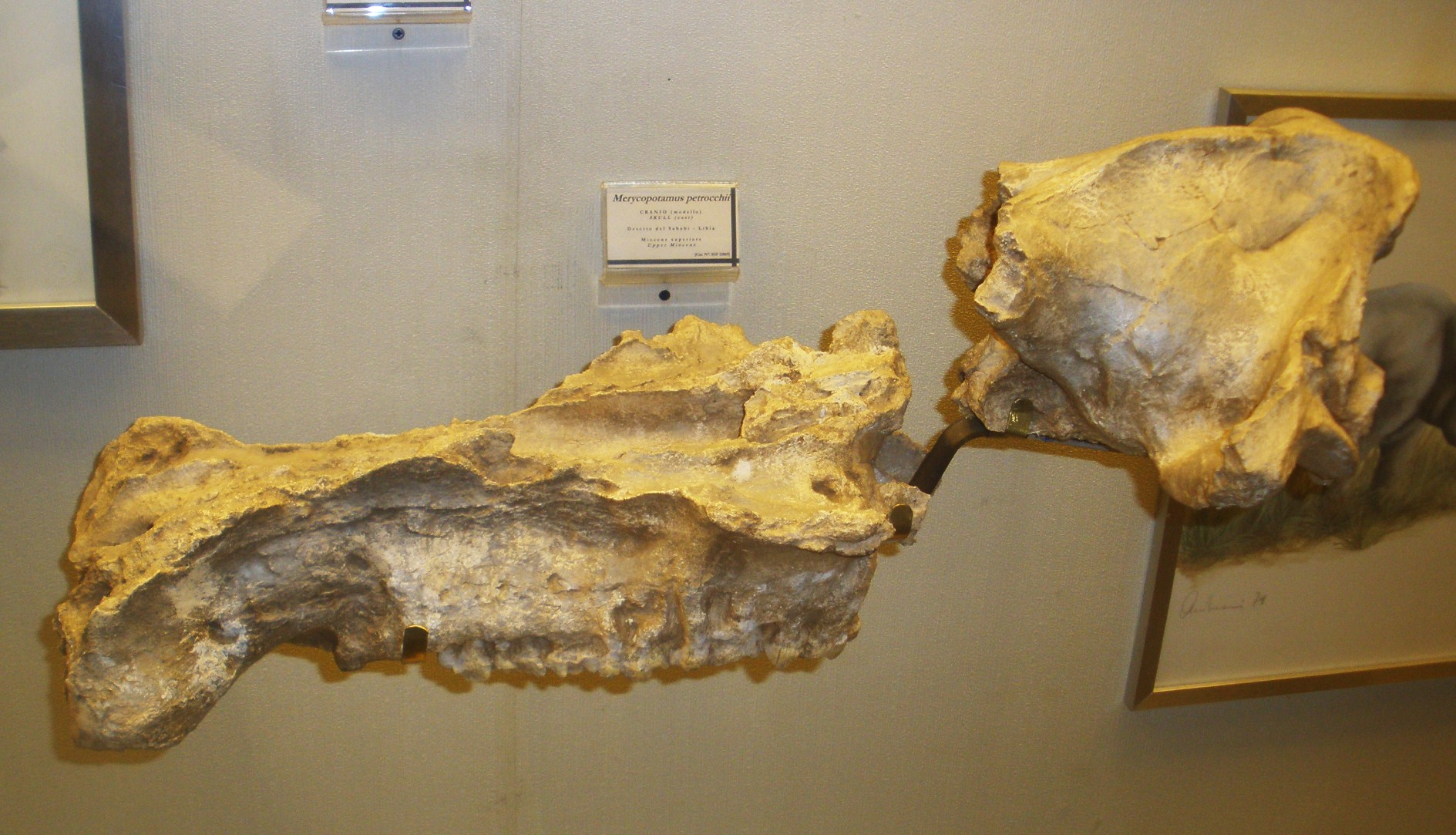
- Fossil of Libycosaurus petrocchii in the Museum of Geology and Paleontology of Florence

Scientific classification
- Kingdom: Animalia
- Phylum: Chordata
- Class: Mammalia
- Order: Artiodactyla
- Family: †Anthracotheriidae
- Subfamily: †Bothriodontinae
- Genus: †Libycosaurus; Bonnarelli, 1947

Species
- †L. algeriensis; †L. anisae; †L. bahri; †L. petrocchii

= Libycosaurus =

Libycosaurus Temporal range: Middle Miocene to Late Miocene

Extinct genus of mammals

Libycosaurus ("Lizard of Libya") was one of the last anthracothere genera. It lived from the Middle to the Late Miocene, and ranged throughout Central and Northern Africa, and in Uganda, in what was then a lush, marshy environment.
