= Sinanthropus =

Obsolete genus, now in Homo erectus

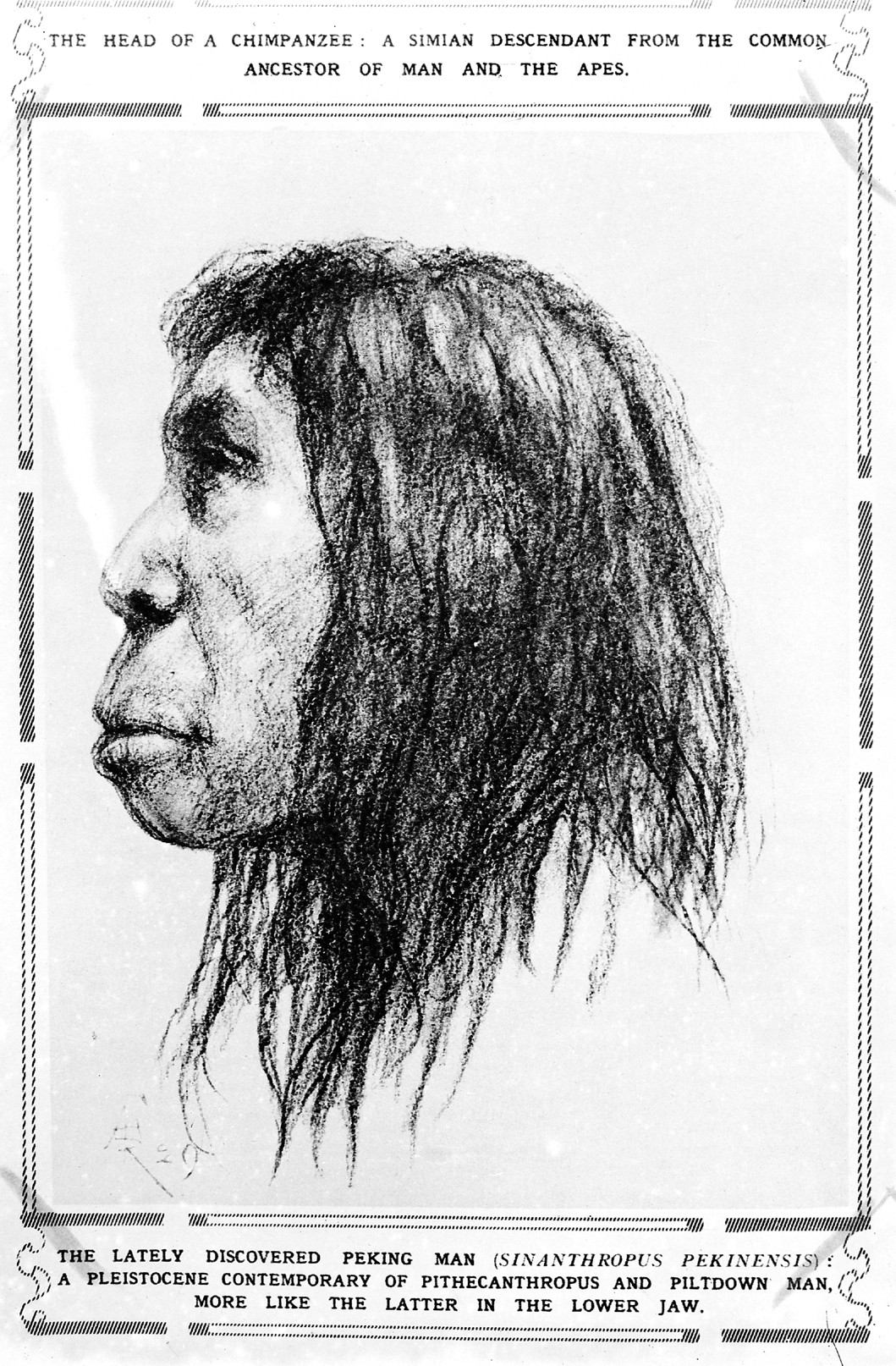
Illustration of Peking Man

Sinanthropus (from Sino-, "China", and anthro-, "man") is an archaic genus in the scientific classification system to which the early hominid fossils of Peking Man, Lantian Man, Nanjing Man, and Yuanmou Man were once assigned. All of them have now been reclassified as Homo erectus, and the genus Sinanthropus is disused. Beginning in the year 1928 to the year 1937, 14 fragmented skulls belonging to the hominids were found in various locations in China. Peking and Chou K’ou-tien are two notable places with fossils found. It has been noted by researchers that it is likely that the found fragmented skulls were brought to the cave after being severed from the bodies they belonged to. This is very likely, because most of the found pieces are teeth and jaws. Some skulls are missing large parts which indicates separation before they were fossilized, not the loss of pieces due to fossilization process.

Sinanthropus contained four species:

- Peking Man — Sinanthropus pekinensis (currently Homo erectus pekinensis)
- Lantian Man — Sinanthropus lantianensis (currently Homo erectus lantianensis)
- Nanjing Man — Sinanthropus nankinensis (currently Homo erectus nankinensis)
- Yuanmou Man — Sinanthropus yuanmouensis (currently Homo erectus yuanmouensis)

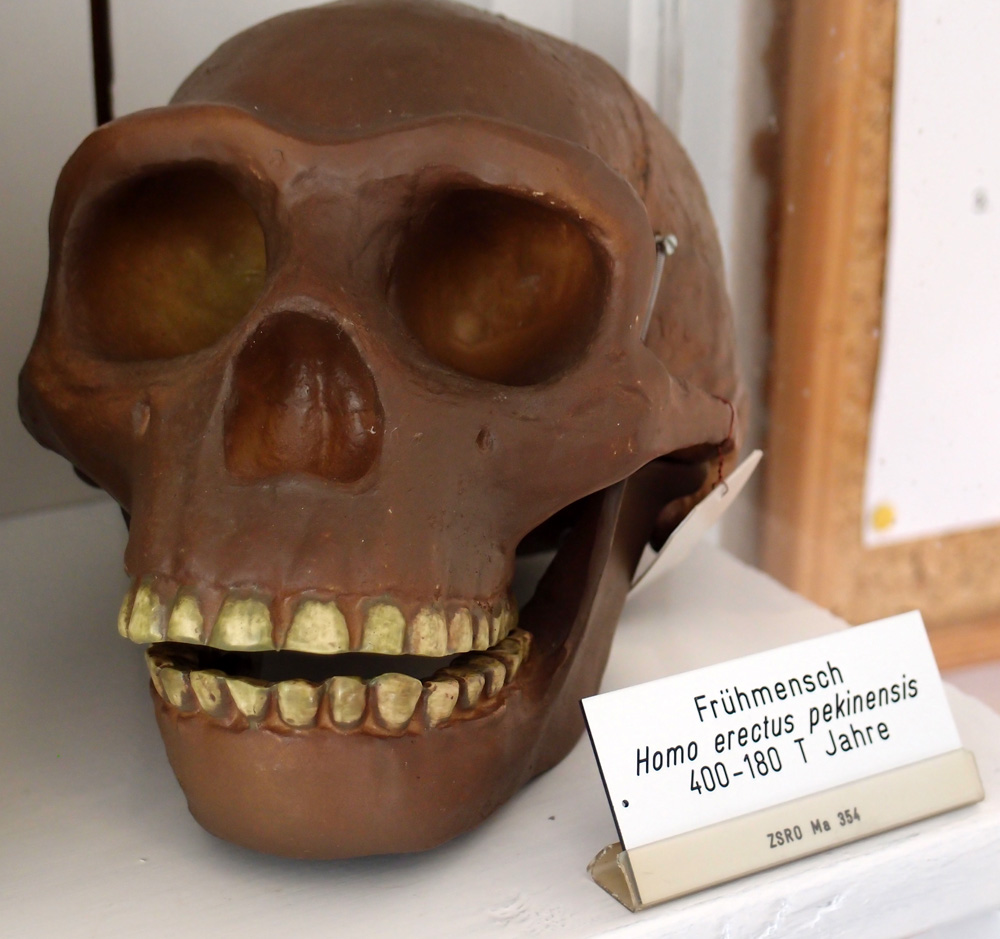
Homo erectus pekinensis

== Discovery ==
Of the four species placed within the genus Sinanthropus, the first to be found were remnants of the Peking man (Sinanthropus pekinensis). The first fossil was retrieved by Otto Zdansky (1894-1988) near the village of Chou K'ou-tien (China) after the Swedish Geologist and Archaeologist Johan Gunnar Andersson (1874-1960) and his colleagues instigated the excavations at the beginning of the 1920's. Many more finds would follow. The Canadian Davidson Black (1884-1934) was the first to identify the fossils as a new hominid genus, Sinanthropus. A substantial part of the originally discovered remains of the Peking man was lost during WWII, when the fossils were transferred to the United States.

After the discovery of the Peking Man remnants, other fossils were found which were classified within the genus Sinanthropus. The discovery of the fossils following up the ones of the Peking man were the remnants of the Lantian man in 1963 and consequently the fossils of the Yuanmou man in 1965 and Nanjing man in 1993. The fossils of the Peking man were the most abundant compared to the other species within Sinanthropus with bones belonging to around 40 individuals. From the Lantian man, a mandible and cranium were found, from the Yuanmou man only two incisors and the fossil record of the Nanjing man consists out of two skulls. Because of the variety in different body parts found at the Chou K'ou-tien excavation site, the traumas which some of the remains suffered, and the incompleteness of some of the skeletons, Henri Breuil (1877-1961) suggested in 1929 that Sinanthropus species were cannibalistic. Opposing the cannibalism theory, the idea was raised that the damage on the remains could be the result of animal scavenging, most probably by the Hyena. A study performed in 2001 showed strong evidence for the animal scavenging theory by linking damage done to the bones to Hyena bite-marks.

=== Missing link ===
After the discovery of Sinanthropus pekinensis, Davidson Black first concluded that the found hominid could be the missing link in the discovery of human evolution. Black stated that Sinanthropus supported the theory that mankind originated in central Asia. However, in 1943 Franz Weidenreich (1873-1948) suggested that Sinanthropus could be the ancestor of the modern Chinese, due to their resemblance in facial characters. Nowadays, both theories are seen as invalid and the “Out of Africa” theory is seen as the most likely, stating that all humans originated from a common African ancestor.

== Features ==
In accordance with the findings of the systematic studies on the fossils, Sinanthropus holds the following phenotypic features. Sinanthropus had an erect posture with similar limbs and trunk to those of modern man but had a different face and head characteristics. The average cranial capacity is assessed to be 1,075cc, which is considerably smaller than the size of the brain of modern humans (1350cc). The facial structure included an extremely broad face, cheekbones which were sharply angled and frontally orientated, a low forehead, enormous eyebrow bones (supraorbital ridges) which protruded forward, broad nasal bones, and big teeth. The stature of Sinanthropus was calculated by Weidenreich to be 156 cm for males and 144 cm for females. This contrasts the claims of Soviet anthropologists, who suggested a higher stature, namely 162 cm for males and 152 cm for females. More specificities described by researchers indicated that Sinanthropus had a different jaw than found in gorillas, similar cranial size to Pithecanthropus, and smaller molars than those found in Pithecanthropus. Researchers were also able to conclude that the teeth found were larger in comparison to Neanderthal men found at the time and the upper canine was long, wide, and similar to that of a tusk. At the time, the genus Sinanthropus was distinguished by the massiveness of the bone fragments that were found. The difference in teeth size created variability among the genus.

== Controversy ==
In the 1930s, papers were published regarding the Sinanthropus and they sought to examine the new hominids and their similar features to other discovered hominids. Dr. Weidenreich was a well-known contributor who was also received blame for a controversy surrounding Sinanthropus. He wrote a research paper about the similarities found in Sinanthropus and Pithecanthropus, where he mentioned the cranial size, jaw proportions and teeth size. Another researcher took an opposing stand and stated that Sinanthropus was “clearly Neanderthaloid”. These two conversations may be responsible for sparking the question revolving if Sinanthropus was even to be considered a genus.
