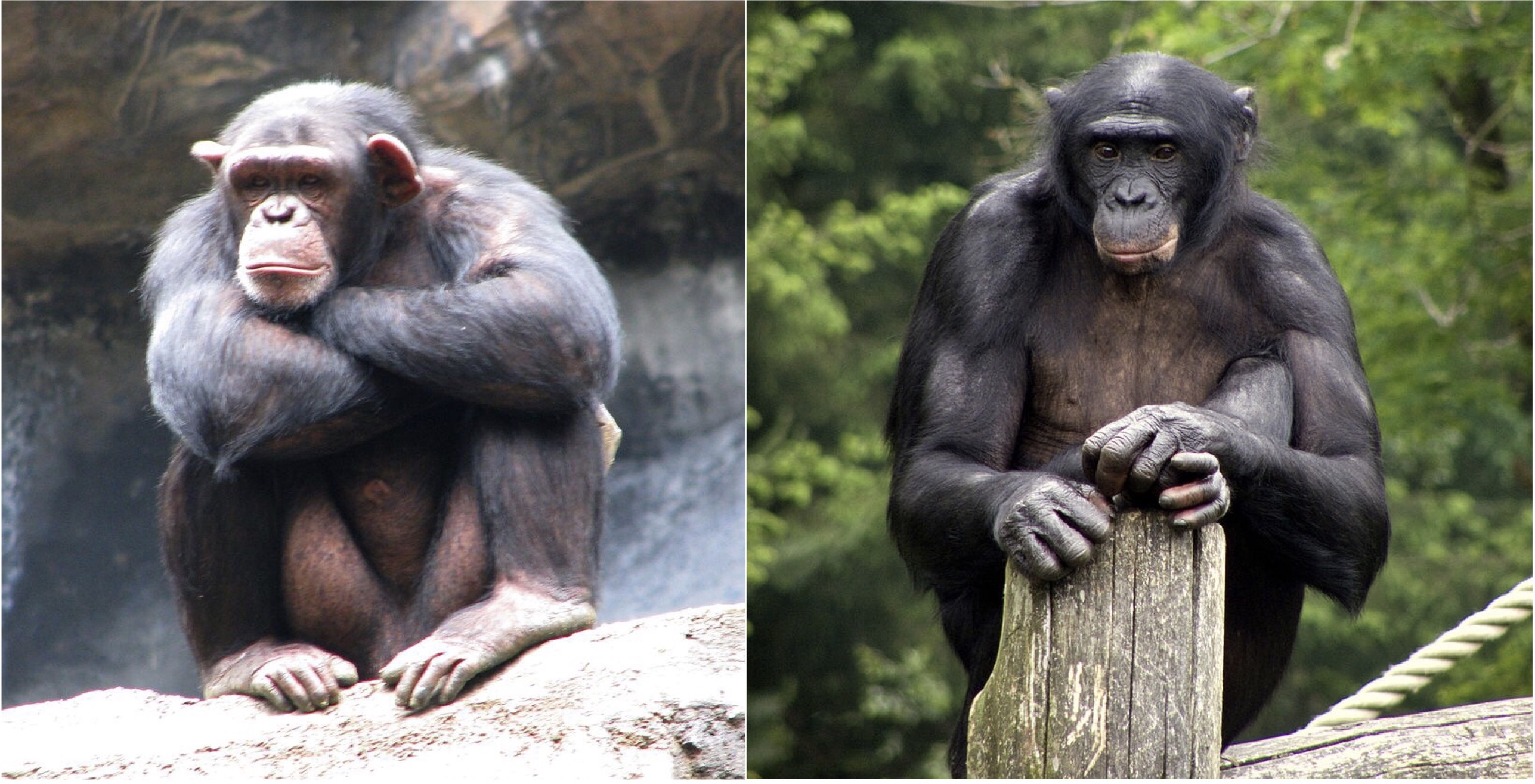
- A male chimpanzee (left) and a male bonobo (right)
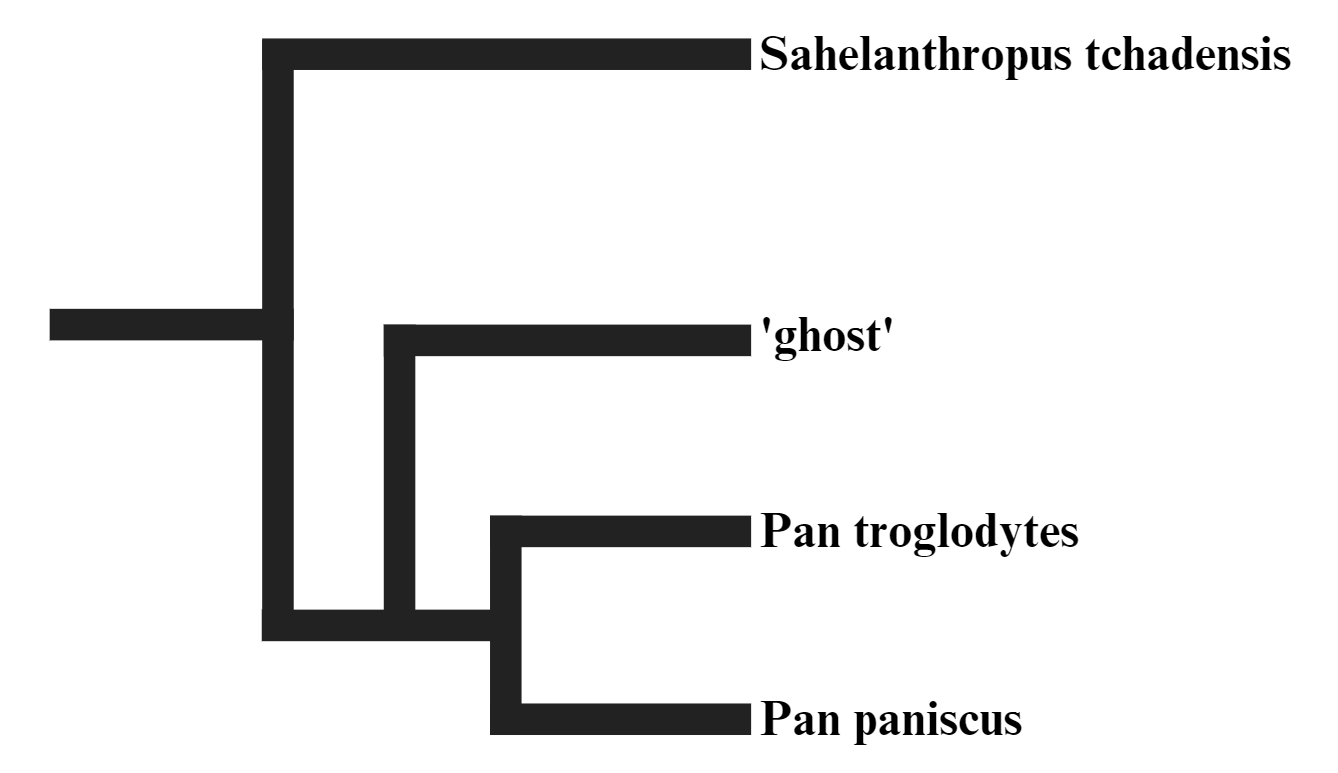
- Phylogeny of Panina including the ghost lineage and Sahelanthropus.

Scientific classification
- Kingdom: Animalia
- Phylum: Chordata
- Class: Mammalia
- Order: Primates
- Suborder: Haplorhini
- Family: Hominidae
- Tribe: Hominini
- Subtribe: Panina; Delson, 1977

Type genus
- Pan Blumenbach, 1775

Genera
- Pan; †Sahelanthropus?

= Panina =

Panina Temporal range: 7–0 Ma

Subtribe of mammals

Panina is a subtribe of tribe Hominini; it comprises all descendants of the human-chimpanzee last common ancestor (LCA) that are not of the branch of human lineage—that is, all those ancestors of the type genus Pan (chimpanzees and bonobos). This split/divergence occurred around 8 to 6 million years ago (mya), which compares with a range of other estimates for this event—likely extended by periods of hybridization—of from 15 to 3 mya. Fossils from this subtribe are typically rare because they tend to live in environments with poor fossilization. Some of the earliest chimpanzee fossils are 500,000 years of age.

== Classification ==
Panina is one of two subtribes of tribe Hominini; the other is Australopithecina (or Hominina). The genus Sahelanthropus lived around the time of the divergence, and may have then been found among one of these groups: a member of either branch of lineage; a precursor to both lineages; or possibly an early member of tribe Gorillini, which previously had split from the human-chimpanzee lineage. Regardless, the morphology of S. tchadensis supports the theory that, at and after the divergence, hominins then are unlikely to resemble in appearance(s) with any number of derived characters of their descendants. A genetic study conducted in 2010 surveyed chimpanzee mitochondrial genomes and discovered the presence of an extinct ghost lineage, (i.e., fossil evidence does not exist yet) of Panina that diverged around 3.3 mya and began interbreeding with bonobos (Pan paniscus), who then interbred with chimpanzees (Pan troglodytes). This signature is carried more heavily in P. troglodytes despite having interbred with bonobos first, seeing as how they occupy a greater range.

== See also ==
- Hominidae
- Homo (sister lineage)
