= Hu Chengzhi =

Chinese paleontologist and paleoanthropologist (1917–2018)

- 胡承志
- Born: 23 August 1917; Shandong, Republic of China
- Died: 12 April 2018 (aged 100); Beijing, China
- Known for: Plaster casts of Peking Man; Identification of Yuanmou Man; Discovery of Keichousaurus

Academic background
- Influences: Davidson Black and Franz Weidenreich

Academic work
- Discipline: Paleontology
- Sub-discipline: Paleoanthropology and palaeoarchaeology
- Institutions: Peking Union Medical College, Ministry of Geology and Geological Museum of China

Hu Chengzhi (Chinese: 胡承志; Wade–Giles: Hu Cheng-chih; 23 August 1917 – 12 April 2018) was a Chinese paleontologist and paleoanthropologist. He made the plaster casts of the Peking Man skull in the 1930s, and identified the Yuanmou Man (Homo erectus yuanmouensis) based on fossils collected by others. He discovered the first fossil of Keichousaurus in 1957, and this species, K. hui, is named after him. A new hadrosaur discovered in Shandong is designated Shantungosaurus giganteus by Hu in 1973.

Hu left school at 13 owing to poverty, and worked at Peking Union Medical College as Davidson Black's assistant. After Black died in 1934, Hu became an apprentice technician for fixing fossils at Franz Weidenreich's laboratory. He made cast copies of Peking Man's skull, and he was the last Chinese eyewitness of the Peking Man fossils, before they were lost during the Second Sino-Japanese War. Hu resigned from the institute in 1947. In the early 1950s, he began to work at the Ministry of Geology.

Hu died in Beijing on 12 April 2018, aged 100.
