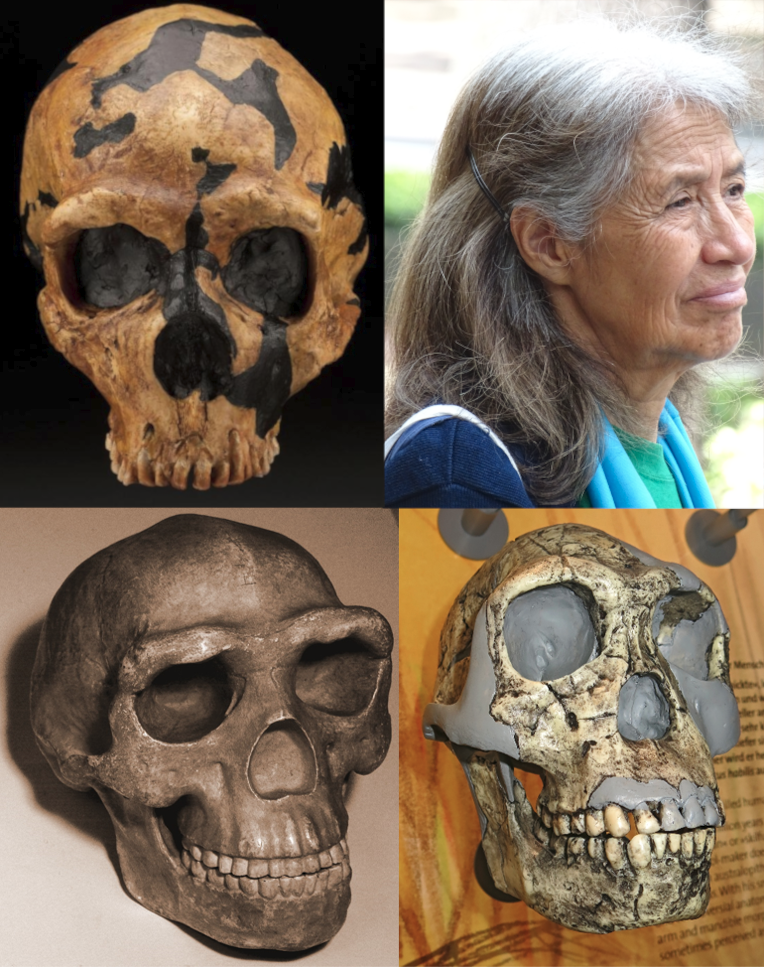
- Notable members of Homo. Clockwise from top left: A Neanderthal (Homo neanderthalensis) skull found in Iraq, a modern human (Homo sapiens) female in Mexico, a reconstructed Homo habilis skull, and a replica skull of Peking Man (subspecies of Homo erectus).

Scientific classification
- Kingdom: Animalia
- Phylum: Chordata
- Class: Mammalia
- Order: Primates
- Superfamily: Hominoidea
- Family: Hominidae
- Subtribe: Hominina
- Genus: Homo; Linnaeus, 1758

Type species
- Homo sapiens Linnaeus, 1758

Species
- Homo sapiens; †Homo antecessor; †Homo erectus; †Homo ergaster; †Homo floresiensis; †Homo georgicus?; †Homo habilis; †Homo heidelbergensis/rhodesiensis; †Denisovan (species name disputed); †Homo luzonensis; †Homo naledi; †Homo neanderthalensis; †Homo rudolfensis; For other species or subspecies suggested, see below.

Synonyms
- Synonyms: Africanthropus Dreyer, 1935; Atlanthropus Arambourg, 1954; Cyphanthropus Pycraft, 1928; Palaeanthropus Bonarelli, 1909; Palaeoanthropus Freudenberg, 1927; Pithecanthropus Dubois, 1894; Protanthropus Haeckel, 1895; Sinanthropus Black, 1927; Tchadanthropus Coppens, 1965; Telanthropus Broom & Anderson 1949

= Homo =

Homo Temporal range: Piacenzian–present, 2.8–0 Ma

Genus of hominins

Homo (from Latin homō 'human') is a genus of great ape (family Hominidae) that emerged from the genus Australopithecus (subtribe Hominina), encompassing a single extant species, Homo sapiens (modern humans), along with a number of extinct species (e.g. Homo erectus and Homo neanderthalensis) classified as either ancestral or closely related to modern humans, collectively called archaic humans. Homo, together with the genus Paranthropus, is probably most closely related to the species Australopithecus africanus within Australopithecus. The closest living relatives of Homo are of the hominin genus Pan (chimpanzees and bonobos), with the ancestors of Pan and Homo estimated to have diverged around 5.7–11 million years ago during the Late Miocene.

The oldest member of the genus is Homo habilis, with fossil records of just over 2 million years ago. (Note: The conventional estimate on the age of H. habilis is at roughly 2.1 to 2.3 million years. Suggestions for pushing back the age to 2.8 Mya were made in 2015 based on the discovery of a jawbone.) H. erectus appeared about 2 million years ago and spread throughout Africa (debatably as another species called Homo ergaster) and Eurasia in several migrations. The species was adaptive and successful, and persisted for more than a million years before gradually diverging into new species around 500,000 years ago. (Note: Homo erectus in the narrow sense (the Asian species) was extinct by 140,000 years ago; H. erectus soloensis, found in Java, is considered the latest known survival of H. erectus. Formerly dated to as late as 50,000 to 40,000 years ago, a 2011 study pushed the H. e. soloensis extinction date back to 143,000 years ago at the latest, more likely before 550,000 years ago.)

Anatomically modern humans (early H. sapiens) emerged close to 300,000 to 200,000 years ago in Africa, and H. neanderthalensis emerged around the same time in Europe and Western Asia. H. sapiens dispersed from Africa in several waves, from possibly as early as 250,000 years ago, and certainly by 130,000 years ago, with the so-called Southern Dispersal, beginning about 70,000–50,000 years ago, leading to the lasting colonisation of Eurasia and Oceania by 50,000 years ago. H. sapiens met and interbred with archaic humans in Africa and in Eurasia. Separate archaic (non-sapiens) human species including Neanderthals are thought to have survived until around 40,000 years ago.

== Names and taxonomy ==
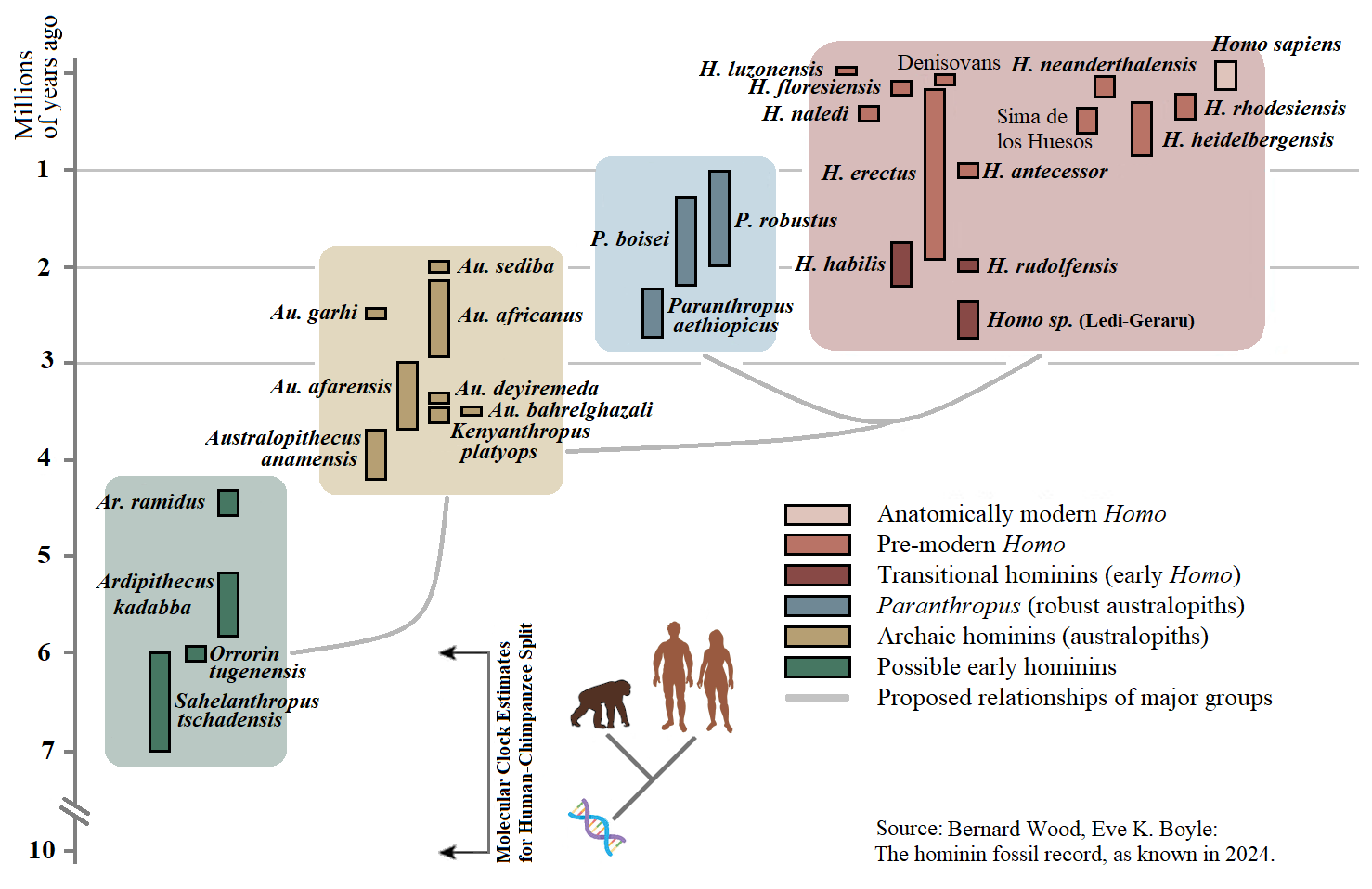
The hominin fossil record as known in 2024

Evolutionary tree chart emphasizing the subfamily Homininae and the tribe Hominini. After diverging from the line to Ponginae, the early Homininae split into the tribes Hominini and Gorillini. The early Hominini split further, separating the line to Homo from the lineage of Pan. Currently, tribe Hominini designates the subtribes Hominina, containing genus Homo; Panina, genus Pan; and Australopithecina, with several extinct genera—the subtribes are not labelled on this chart.

The Latin noun homō (genitive hominis) means "human being" or "man" in the generic sense of "human being, mankind". (Note: The word "human" itself is from Latin humanus, an adjective formed on the root of homo, thought to derive from a Proto-Indo-European word for "earth" reconstructed as *dʰǵʰem-.) The binomial name Homo sapiens was coined by Carl Linnaeus (1758). (Note: In 1959, Carl Linnaeus was designated as the lectotype for Homo sapiens, which means that following the nomenclatural rules, Homo sapiens was validly defined as the animal species to which Linnaeus belonged.) Names for other species of the genus were introduced from the second half of the 19th century (H. neanderthalensis 1864, H. erectus 1892).

The genus Homo has not been strictly defined, even today. Since the early human fossil record began to slowly emerge from the earth, the boundaries and definitions of the genus have been poorly defined and constantly in flux. Because there was no reason to think it would ever have any additional members, Carl Linnaeus did not define Homo when he first created it for humans in the 18th century. The discovery of Neanderthal brought the first addition.

The genus Homo was given its taxonomic name to suggest that its member species can be classified as human. And, over the decades of the 20th century, fossil finds of pre-human and early human species from late Miocene and early Pliocene times produced a rich mix for debating classifications. There is continuing debate on delineating Homo from Australopithecus—or, indeed, delineating Homo from Pan. Even so, classifying the fossils of Homo coincides with evidence of: (1) competent human bipedalism in Homo habilis inherited from the earlier Australopithecus of more than four million years ago, as demonstrated by the Laetoli footprints; and (2) human tool culture having begun by 2.5 million years ago to 3 million years ago.

From the late-19th to mid-20th centuries, a number of new taxonomic names, including new generic names, were proposed for early human fossils; most have since been merged with Homo in recognition that Homo erectus was a single species with a large geographic spread of early migrations. Many such names are now regarded as "synonyms" with Homo, including Pithecanthropus, Protanthropus, Sinanthropus, Cyphanthropus, Africanthropus, Telanthropus, Atlanthropus, and Tchadanthropus.

Classifying the genus Homo into species and subspecies is subject to incomplete information and remains poorly done. This has led to using common names ("Neanderthal" and "Denisovan"), even in scientific papers, to avoid trinomial names or the ambiguity of classifying groups as incertae sedis (uncertain placement)—for example, H. neanderthalensis vs. H. sapiens neanderthalensis, or H. georgicus vs. H. erectus georgicus. Some recently extinct species in the genus have been discovered only lately and do not as yet have consensus binomial names (see Denisova hominin). Since the beginning of the Holocene, it is likely that Homo sapiens (anatomically modern humans) has been the only extant species of Homo.

John Edward Gray (1825) was an early advocate of classifying taxa by designating tribes and families. Wood and Richmond (2000) proposed that Hominini ("hominins") be designated as a tribe that comprised all species of early humans and pre-humans ancestral to humans back to after the chimpanzee–human last common ancestor, and that Hominina be designated a subtribe of Hominini to include only the genus Homo — that is, not including the earlier upright walking hominins of the Pliocene such as Australopithecus, Orrorin tugenensis, Ardipithecus, or Sahelanthropus. Designations alternative to Hominina existed, or were offered: Australopithecinae (Gregory & Hellman 1939) and Preanthropinae (Cela-Conde & Altaba 2002); and later, Cela-Conde and Ayala (2003) proposed that the four genera Australopithecus, Ardipithecus, Praeanthropus, and Sahelanthropus be grouped with Homo within Hominini (sans Pan).

== Evolution ==
=== Australopithecus and the appearance of Homo ===
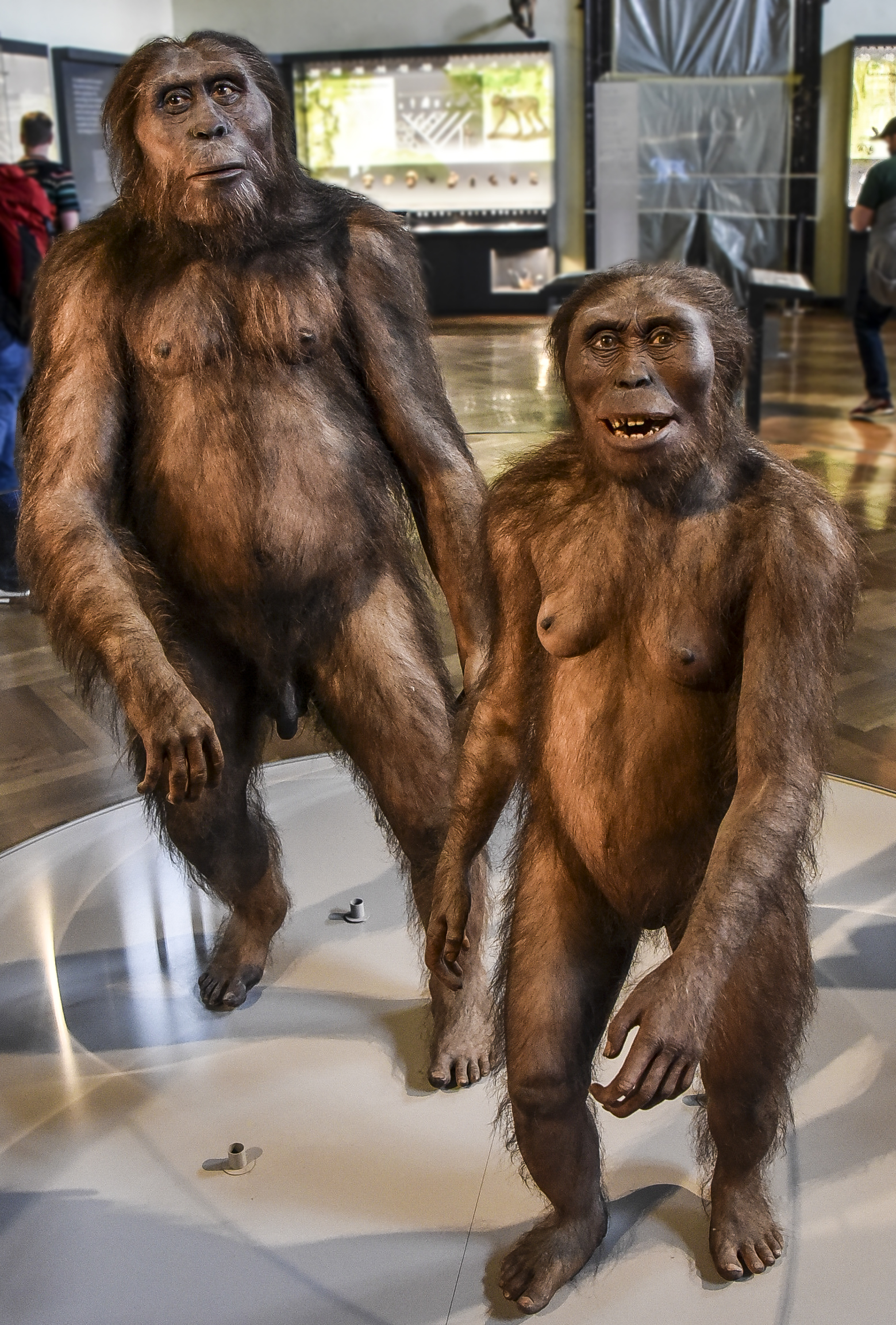
Reconstruction of Australopithecus afarensis, Natural History Museum, Vienna

Several species, including Australopithecus garhi, Australopithecus sediba, Australopithecus africanus, and Australopithecus afarensis, have been proposed as the ancestor or sister of the Homo lineage. These species have morphological features that align them with Homo, but there is no consensus as to which gave rise to Homo.

Especially since the 2010s, the delineation of Homo in Australopithecus has become more contentious. Traditionally, the advent of Homo has been taken to coincide with the first use of stone tools (the Oldowan industry), and thus by definition with the beginning of the Lower Palaeolithic. But in 2010, evidence was presented that seems to attribute the use of stone tools to Australopithecus afarensis around 3.3 million years ago, close to a million years before the first appearance of Homo. LD 350-1, a fossil mandible fragment dated to 2.8 Mya, discovered in 2013 in Afar, Ethiopia, was described as combining "primitive traits seen in early Australopithecus with derived morphology observed in later Homo. Some authors would push the development of Homo close to or even past 3 Mya. (Note: Cela-Conde & Ayala (2003) recognize five genera within Hominina: Ardipithecus, Australopithecus (including Paranthropus), Homo (including Kenyanthropus), Praeanthropus (including Orrorin), and Sahelanthropus.) This finds support in a recent phylogenetic study in hominins that by using morphological, molecular and radiometric information, dates the emergence of Homo at 3.3 Mya (4.30 – 2.56 Mya). Others have voiced doubt as to whether Homo habilis should be included in Homo, proposing an origin of Homo with Homo erectus at roughly 1.9 Mya instead.

The most salient physiological development between the earlier australopithecine species and Homo is the increase in endocranial volume (ECV), from about 460 cm^{3} (28 cu in) in A. garhi to 660 cm^{3} (40 cu in) in H. habilis and further to 760 cm^{3} (46 cu in) in H. erectus, 1,250 cm^{3} (76 cu in) in H. heidelbergensis and up to 1,760 cm^{3} (107 cu in) in H. neanderthalensis. However, a steady rise in cranial capacity is observed already in Australopithecina and does not terminate after the emergence of Homo, so that it does not serve as an objective criterion to define the emergence of the genus.

=== Homo habilis ===
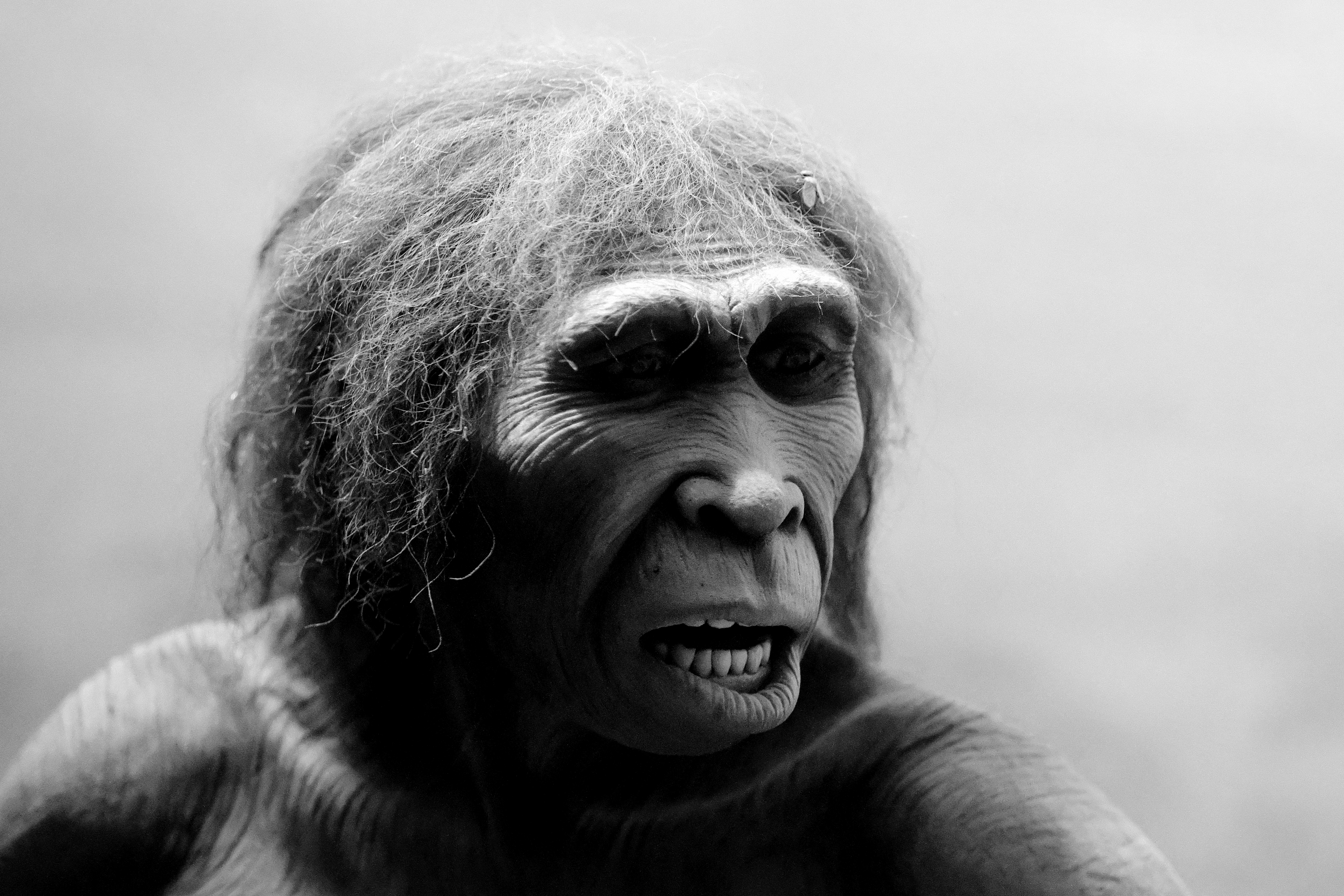
Reconstruction of H. ergaster, American Museum of Natural History

Homo habilis emerged about 2.1 Mya. Already before 2010, there were suggestions that H. habilis should not be placed in the genus Homo but rather in Australopithecus. The main reason to include H. habilis in Homo, its undisputed tool use, has become obsolete with the discovery of Australopithecus tool use at least a million years before H. habilis. Furthermore, H. habilis was long thought to be the ancestor of the more gracile Homo ergaster (Homo erectus). In 2007, it was discovered that H. habilis and H. erectus coexisted for a considerable time, suggesting that H. erectus is not immediately derived from H. habilis but instead from a common ancestor. With the publication of Dmanisi skull 5 in 2013, it has become less certain that Asian H. erectus is a descendant of African H. ergaster which was in turn derived from H. habilis. Instead, H. ergaster and H. erectus appear to be variants of the same species, which may have originated in either Africa or Asia and widely dispersed throughout Eurasia (including Europe, Indonesia, China) by 0.5 Mya.

=== Homo erectus ===
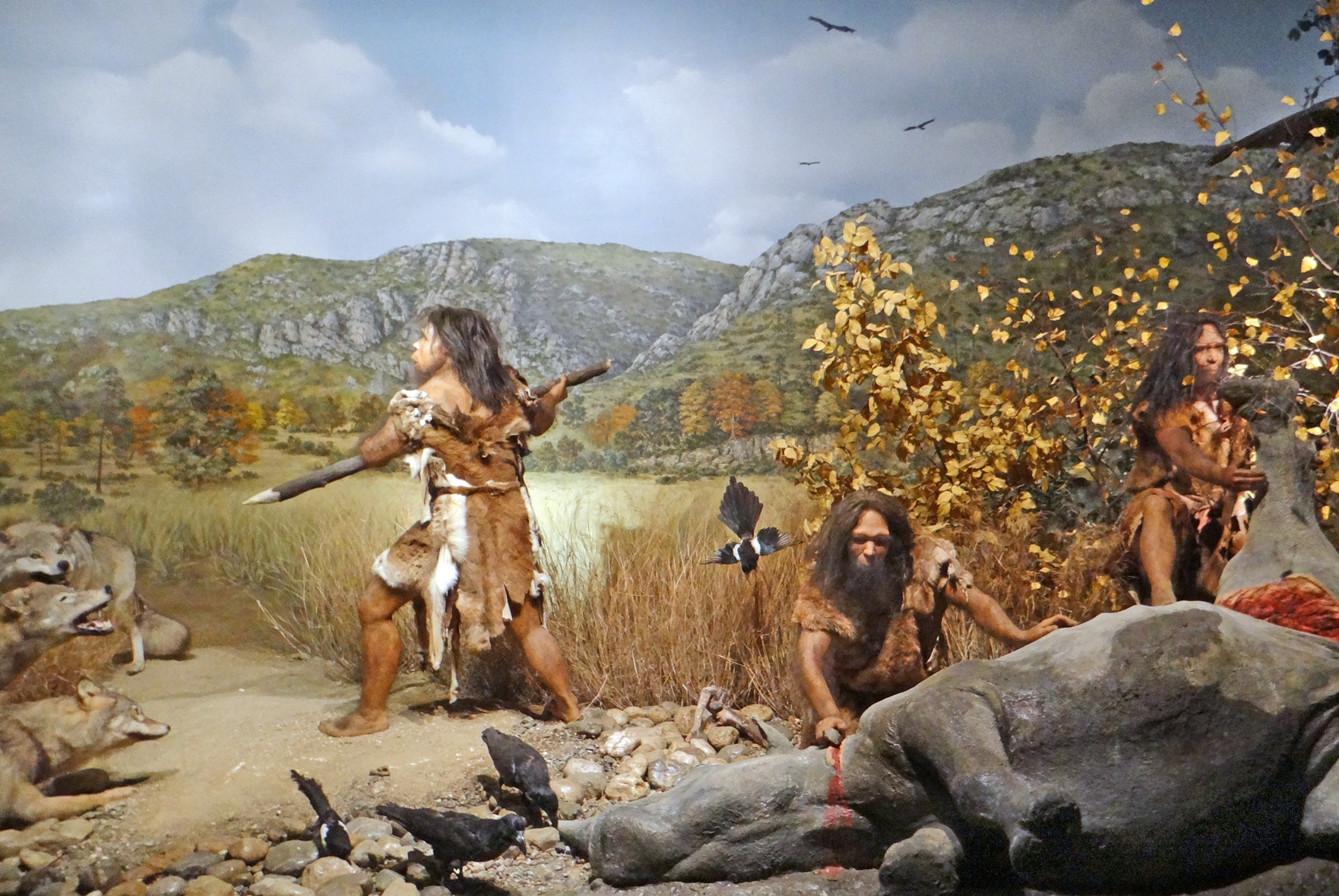
Homo heidelbergensis may have evolved from H. ergaster, possibly following an intense population bottleneck 800,000 to 900,000 years ago.

Homo erectus has often been assumed to have developed anagenetically from H. habilis from about 2 million years ago. This scenario was strengthened with the discovery of Homo erectus georgicus, early specimens of H. erectus found in the Caucasus, which seemed to exhibit transitional traits with H. habilis. For example they showed increased cranial capacity from around 575 cm^{3} in H. habilis to around 850 cm^{3} in H. erectus. As the earliest evidence for H. erectus was found outside of Africa, it was considered plausible that H. erectus developed in Eurasia and then migrated back to Africa. Based on fossils from the Koobi Fora Formation, east of Lake Turkana in Kenya, a 2007 study argued that H. habilis may have survived beyond the emergence of H. erectus, so that the evolution of H. erectus would not have been anagenetical, and H. erectus would have existed alongside H. habilis for about half a million years (1.9 to 1.4 million years ago), during the early Calabrian. On 31 August 2023, researchers reported, based on genetic studies, that a human ancestor population bottleneck (from a possible 100,000 to 1,000 individuals) occurred "around 930,000 and 813,000 years ago ... lasted for about 117,000 years and brought human ancestors close to extinction."

Kenneth M. Weiss estimated that there have been about 44 billion individuals of the genus Homo from its origins to the evolution of H. erectus, about 56 billion individuals from H. erectus to the Neolithic, and another 51 billion individuals since the Neolithic.

A separate South African species Homo gautengensis was postulated as contemporary with H. erectus in 2010.

== Phylogeny ==
Hominin timeline
← / Earlier apes; ← / Gorilla split; ← / Chimpanzee split; ← / Earliest bipedal; ← / Earliest sign of Ardipithecus; ← / Earliest sign of Australopithecus; ← / Earliest stone tools; ← / Earliest sign of Homo; ← / Dispersal beyond Africa; ← / Earliest fire / cooking; ← / Earliest rock art; ← / Earliest clothes; ← / Modern humans
(million years ago)

A taxonomy of Homo within the great apes is assessed as follows, with Paranthropus and Homo emerging within Australopithecus (shown here cladistically granting Paranthropus, Kenyanthropus, and Homo). (Note: The line to the earliest members of Homo were derived from Australopithecus, a genus that had separated from the chimpanzee–human last common ancestor by late Miocene or early Pliocene times.) The exact phylogeny within Australopithecus is still highly controversial. Approximate radiation dates of daughter clades are shown in millions of years ago (Mya). Sahelanthropus and Orrorin, possibly sisters to Australopithecus, are not shown here. The naming of groupings is sometimes muddled as often certain groupings are presumed before any cladistic analysis is performed.

- Hominoidea (20.4 Mya)
  - Hylobatidae (gibbons)
  - Hominidae (15.7)
    - Ponginae (orangutans)
    - Homininae (8.8)
      - Gorillini (gorillas)
      - Hominini (7.5)
        - Panina (chimpanzees)
        - Australopithecines (incl. Australopithecus, Kenyanthropus, Paranthropus, Homo)

Cladogram based on Dembo et al. (2016) with ages of last occurrence based on Wood & Boyle (2016):

- Australopithecines (7.3 Mya)
  - Ardipithecus ramidus (†4.3)
  - Australopithecus s.l. (5.5)
    - Australopithecus anamensis s.s. (†3.9)
    - - - Australopithecus afarensis (†3.0)
        - Australopithecus garhi (†2.4)
      - - Kenyanthropus platyops (†3.3)
        - - - Australopithecus africanus (†2.4)
            - Paranthropus (†1.0)
          - Homo (3.3)
            - Homo floresiensis (†0.01)
            - - - Homo habilis (†1.6)
                - Australopithecus sediba (†2.0)
              - - Homo rudolfensis (†2.0)
                - - Georgian H. erectus (†1.8)
                  - - African Homo erectus (†1.4)
                    - - Asian H. erectus (†0.03)
                      - - Homo naledi (†0.2)
                        - - Homo antecessor (†0.9)
                          - - Homo sapiens
                            - - Homo heidelbergensis (†0.1)
                              - H. neanderthalensis (†0.04)

Cladogram based on Feng et al. (2025): (Note: Ages as listed in the supplementary materials for Feng et al. (2025))

- Homo (2.84)
  - Homo habilis (†1.78 Mya)
  - Homo erectus s.l. (2.6)
    - Stw53 (†1.9)
    - (2.3)
      - - Turkana (†1.53)
        - - Dmanisi (†1.77)
          - Olduvai Hominids (†1.47)
      - (2.0)
        - Homo naledi (†0.33)
        - (1.8)
          - Homo floresiensis (†0.05)
          - - - - Sambungmacan (†0.2)
                - Ngandong (†0.1)
              - - - Peking Man (†0.28)
                  - Nanjing Man (†0.58)
                - - Hexian (†0.39)
                  - Sangiran (†1.3)
            - (1.6)
              - Homo heidelbergensis (†0.15)
              - (1.4)
                - H. neanderthalensis (†0.04)
                - (1.3)
                  - Homo sapiens
                  - (1.3)
                    - H. antecessor (†0.77)
                    - H. longi (†0.05)

Several of the Homo lineages appear to have surviving progeny through introgression into other lines. Genetic evidence indicates an archaic lineage separating from the other human lineages 1.5 million years ago, perhaps H. erectus, may have interbred into the Denisovans about 55,000 years ago. Fossil evidence shows H. erectus s.s. survived at least until 117,000 yrs ago, and the even more basal H. floresiensis survived until 50,000 years ago. A 1.5-million-year H. erectus-like lineage appears to have made its way into modern humans through the Denisovans and specifically into the Papuans and aboriginal Australians. The genomes of non-sub-Saharan African humans show what appear to be numerous independent introgression events involving Neanderthal and in some cases also Denisovans around 45,000 years ago. The genetic structure of some sub-Saharan African groups seems to be indicative of introgression from a west Eurasian population some 3,000 years ago.

Some evidence suggests that Australopithecus sediba could be moved to the genus Homo, or placed in its own genus, due to its position with respect to e.g. H. habilis and H. floresiensis.

=== Dispersal ===
By about 1.8 million years ago, H. erectus is present in both East Africa (H. ergaster) and in Western Asia (H. georgicus). The ancestors of Indonesian H. floresiensis may have left Africa even earlier. (Note: In a 2015 phylogenetic study, H. floresiensis was placed with Australopithecus sediba, H. habilis and Dmanisi Man, raising the possibility that the ancestors of H. floresiensis left Africa before the appearance of H. erectus, possibly even becoming the first hominins to do so and evolved further in Asia.)

Successive dispersals of Homo erectus (yellow), H. neanderthalensis (ochre) and H. sapiens (red)

Homo erectus and related or derived archaic human species over the next 1.5 million years spread throughout Africa and Eurasia (see: Recent African origin of modern humans). Europe is reached by about 0.5 Mya by Homo heidelbergensis.

Homo neanderthalensis and H. sapiens develop after about 300 kya. Homo naledi is present in Southern Africa by 300 kya.

H. sapiens soon after its first emergence spread throughout Africa, and to Western Asia in several waves, possibly as early as 250 kya, and certainly by 130 kya. In July 2019, anthropologists reported the discovery of 210,000 year old remains of a H. sapiens and 170,000 year old remains of a H. neanderthalensis in Apidima Cave, Peloponnese, Greece, more than 150,000 years older than previous H. sapiens finds in Europe.

Most notable is the Southern Dispersal of H. sapiens around 60 kya, which led to the lasting peopling of Oceania and Eurasia by anatomically modern humans. H. sapiens interbred with archaic humans both in Africa and in Eurasia, in Eurasia notably with Neanderthals and Denisovans.

Among extant populations of H. sapiens, the deepest temporal division is found in the San people of Southern Africa, estimated at close to 130,000 years, or possibly more than 300,000 years ago. Temporal division among non-Africans is of the order of 60,000 years in the case of Australo-Melanesians. Division of Europeans and East Asians is of the order of 50,000 years, with repeated and significant admixture events throughout Eurasia during the Holocene.

Archaic human species may have survived until the beginning of the Holocene, although they were mostly extinct or absorbed by the expanding H. sapiens populations by 40 kya (Neanderthal extinction).

== List of lineages ==
The species status of H. rudolfensis, H. ergaster, H. georgicus, H. antecessor, H. cepranensis, H. rhodesiensis, H. neanderthalensis, Denisova hominin, and H. floresiensis remain under debate. H. heidelbergensis and H. neanderthalensis are closely related to each other and have been considered to be subspecies of H. sapiens.

There has historically been a trend to postulate new human species based on as little as an individual fossil. A "minimalist" approach to human taxonomy recognizes at most three species, H. habilis (2.1–1.5 Mya, membership in Homo questionable), H. erectus (1.8–0.1 Mya, including the majority of the age of the genus, and the majority of archaic varieties as subspecies, including H. heidelbergensis as a late or transitional variety) and Homo sapiens (300 kya to present, including H. neanderthalensis and other varieties as subspecies). Consistent definitions and methodology of species delineation are not generally agreed upon in anthropology or paleontology. Indeed, speciating populations of mammals can typically interbreed for several million years after they begin to genetically diverge, so all contemporary "species" in the genus Homo would potentially have been able to interbreed at the time, and introgression from beyond the genus Homo can not a priori be ruled out. It has been suggested that H. naledi may have been a hybrid with a late surviving Australipith (taken to mean beyond Homo, ed.), despite the fact that these lineages generally are regarded as long extinct. As discussed above, many introgressions have occurred between lineages, with evidence of introgression after separation of 1.5 million years.

Comparative table of Homo lineages
Lineages	Temporal range (kya)	Habitat	Adult height	Adult mass	Cranial capacity (cm^{3})	Fossil record	Discovery/ publication of name
H. habilis membership in Homo uncertain	2,100–1,500 (Note: Confirmed H. habilis fossils are dated to between 2.1 and 1.5 million years ago. This date range overlaps with the emergence of Homo erectus.) (Note: Hominins with "proto-Homo" traits may have lived as early as 2.8 million years ago, as suggested by a fossil jawbone classified as transitional between Australopithecus and Homo discovered in 2015.)	Tanzania	110–140 cm (3 ft 7 in – 4 ft 7 in)	33–55 kg (73–121 lb)	510–660	Many	1960; 1964
H. rudolfensis membership in Homo uncertain	1,900	Kenya			700	2 sites	1972; 1986
H. gautengensis also classified as H. habilis	1,900–600	South Africa	100 cm (3 ft 3 in)			3 individuals (Note: A species proposed in 2010 based on the fossil remains of three individuals dated between 1.9 and 0.6 million years ago. The same fossils were also classified as H. habilis, H. ergaster or Australopithecus by other anthropologists.)	2010; 2010
H. erectus	2,000–140 (Note: H. erectus may have appeared some 2 million years ago. Fossils dated to as much as 1.8 million years ago have been found both in Africa and in Southeast Asia, and some of the oldest fossils (1.85 to 1.77 million years ago) were found in the Caucasus. The oldest identified H. erectus specimen is a 2.04 million year old skull, DNH 134, from Drimolen, South Africa.) (Note: Homo erectus soloensis, found in Java, is considered the latest known survival of H. erectus. Formerly dated to as late as 50,000 to 40,000 years ago, a 2011 study pushed back the date of its extinction of H. e. soloensis to 143,000 years ago at the latest, more likely before 550,000 years ago.)	Africa, Eurasia	180 cm (5 ft 11 in)	60 kg (130 lb)	850 (early) – 1,100 (late)	Many (Note: Now also included in H. erectus are Peking Man (formerly Sinanthropus pekinensis) and Java Man (formerly Pithecanthropus erectus).) (Note: H. erectus is now grouped into various subspecies, including Homo erectus erectus, Homo erectus yuanmouensis, Homo erectus lantianensis, Homo erectus nankinensis, Homo erectus pekinensis, Homo erectus palaeojavanicus, Homo erectus soloensis, Homo erectus tautavelensis, Homo erectus georgicus. The distinction from descendant species such as Homo ergaster, Homo floresiensis, Homo antecessor, Homo heidelbergensis and indeed Homo sapiens is not entirely clear.)	1891; 1892
H. ergaster African H. erectus	1,800–1,300	East and Southern Africa			700–850	Many	1949; 1975
H. antecessor	1,200–800	Western Europe	175 cm (5 ft 9 in)	90 kg (200 lb)	1,000	2 sites	1994; 1997
H. floresiensis classification uncertain	1,000–50	Indonesia	100 cm (3 ft 3 in)	25 kg (55 lb)	400	7 individuals	2003; 2004
H. heidelbergensis early H. neanderthalensis?	600–300 (Note: The type fossil is Mauer 1, dated to ca. 0.6 million years ago. The transition from H. heidelbergensis to H. neanderthalensis between 300 and 243 thousand years ago is conventional, and makes use of the fact that there is no known fossil in this period. Examples of H. heidelbergensis are fossils found at Bilzingsleben (also classified as Homo erectus bilzingslebensis).)	Europe, Africa	180 cm (5 ft 11 in)	90 kg (200 lb)	1,100–1,400	Many	1907; 1908
H. cepranensis a single fossil, possibly H. heidelbergensis	c. 450	Italy			1,000	1 skull cap	1994; 2003
H. naledi	335—236	South Africa	150 cm (4 ft 11 in)	45 kg (99 lb)	450	15 individuals	2013; 2015
H. rhodesiensis possibly H. heidelbergensis	c. 300	Zambia			1,300	Single or very few	1921; 1921
H. sapiens (anatomically modern humans)	c. 300–present (Note: The age of H. sapiens has long been assumed to be close to 200,000 years, but since 2017 there have been a number of suggestions extending this time to as high as 300,000 years. In 2017, fossils found in Jebel Irhoud (Morocco) suggest that Homo sapiens may have speciated by as early as 315,000 years ago. Genetic evidence has been adduced for an age of roughly 270,000 years.)	Worldwide	150–190 cm (4 ft 11 in – 6 ft 3 in)	50–100 kg (110–220 lb)	950–1,800	(extant)	—— 1758
H. longi	c. 1,000–c. 51	Siberia			1,420	Many	2000; 2021
H. neanderthalensis	240–40 (Note: The first humans with "proto-Neanderthal traits" lived in Eurasia as early as 0.6 to 0.35 million years ago (classified as H. heidelbergensis, also called a chronospecies because it represents a chronological grouping rather than being based on clear morphological distinctions from either H. erectus or H. neanderthalensis). There is a fossil gap in Europe between 300 and 243 kya, and by convention, fossils younger than 243 kya are called "Neanderthal".)	Europe, Western Asia	170 cm (5 ft 7 in)	55–70 kg (121–154 lb) (heavily built)	1,200–1,900	Many	1829; 1864
Nesher Ramla Homo classification uncertain	140–120	Israel				several individuals	2021
Penghu 1 possibly H. erectus or Denisova	c. 100 (Note: younger than 450 kya, either between 190–130 or between 70–10 kya)	Taiwan				1 individual	2008(?); 2015
H. luzonensis	134–49	Philippines				3 individuals	2007; 2019

== See also ==
- List of human evolution fossils (with images)
- Multiregional origin of modern humans

== Bibliography ==
- Wood, Bernard; Richmond, Brian G. (July 2000). "Human evolution: taxonomy and paleobiology". Journal of Anatomy. 197 (1): 19–60. doi:10.1046/j.1469-7580.2000.19710019.x. PMC 1468107. PMID 10999270.
