= Nanjing Man =

Hominin fossil from China

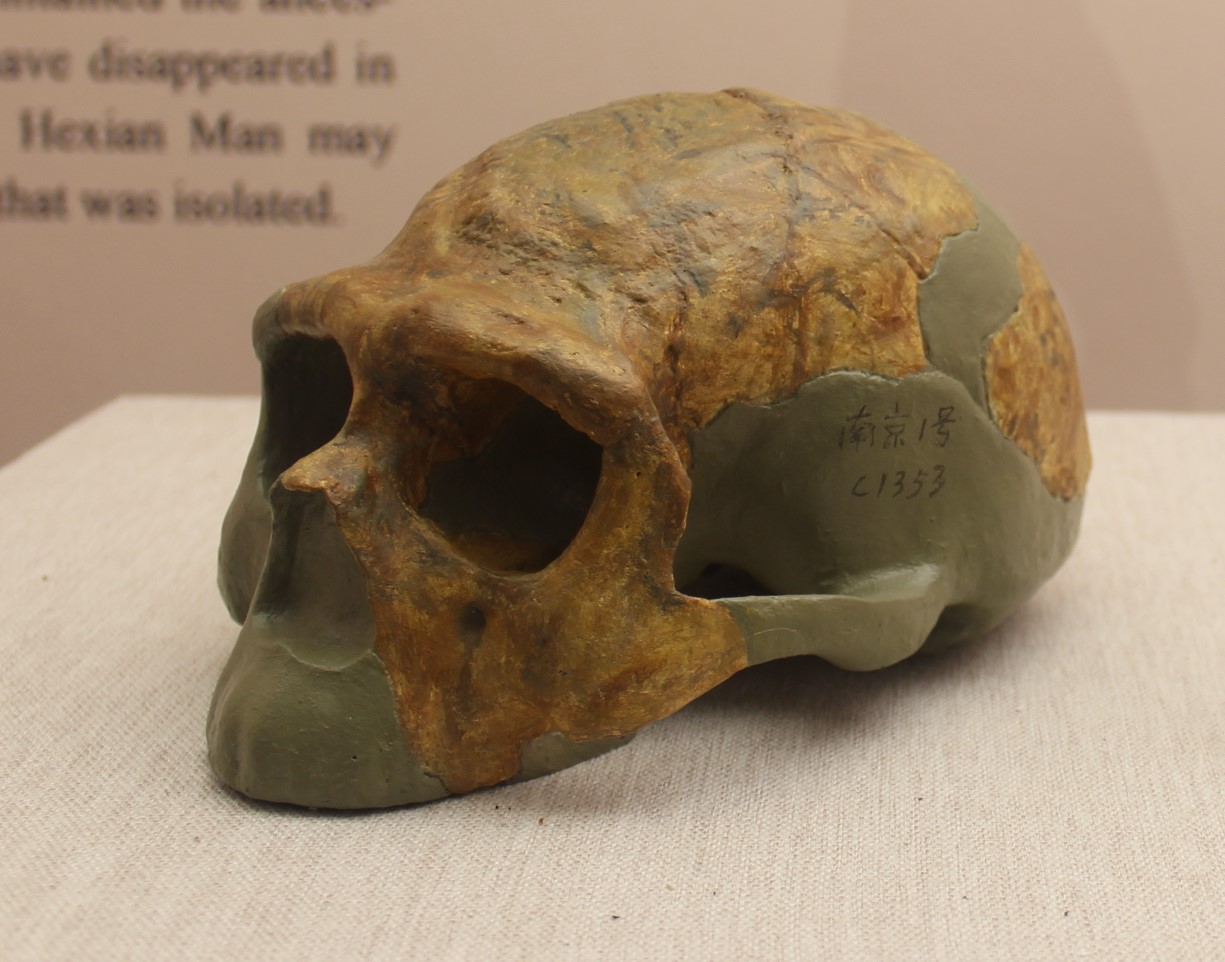
- Skull cast, Paleozoological Museum of China
- Catalog no.: Nanjing 1-3
- Common name: Nanjing Man
- Species: Homo erectus Homo pekinensis?
- Age: 580-620 ka
- Place discovered: Jiangning District
- Date discovered: March 1993
- Discovered by: Liu Luhong

Nanjing Man is a specimen of Homo erectus (possibly Homo pekinensis) found in China. Large fragments of one male and one female skull and a molar tooth were discovered in 1993 in Hulu Cave (Chinese: 葫芦洞; pinyin: Húlu dòng; lit. 'Calabash cave') on the Tangshan (汤山) hills in Jiangning District, Nanjing. The specimens were found in the Hulu limestone cave at a depth of 60–97 cm by Liu Luhong, a local worker. Dating the fossils yielded an estimated age of 580,000 to 620,000 years old.

== Discovery ==
Hominin timeline
← / Earlier apes; ← / Gorilla split; ← / Chimpanzee split; ← / Earliest bipedal; ← / Earliest sign of Ardipithecus; ← / Earliest sign of Australopithecus; ← / Earliest stone tools; ← / Earliest sign of Homo; ← / Dispersal beyond Africa; ← / Earliest fire / cooking; ← / Earliest rock art; ← / Earliest clothes; ← / Modern humans
(million years ago)

In 1992, Mu Xi-nan (穆西南), Xu Hankui (许汉奎), Mu Daocheng (穆道成), and Zhong Shilan (钟石兰) with the Nanjing Institute of Geology and Paleontology (NIGP) identified Hulu Cave near the Tangshan Subdistrict in Jiangning District, Nanjing (roughly 26 km (16 mi) east of the city center of Nanjing) as a mammalian fossil bearing site, and organised further excavations with the Institute of Vertebrate Paleontology and Paleoanthropology (IVPP) headquartered in Beijing. In March 1993, local labourer Liu Luhong discovered two partial skull fragments (Nanjing 1 and 2), the first retaining most of the face, and an upper molar (Nanjing 3).

The mammal assemblage indicated Huludong was roughly contemporaneous with the Zhoukoudian cave site near Beijing, home of the Peking Man (the reason why the IVPP had joined the excavations).

== Age determination ==
Researchers used mass spectrometric U-series dating to identify the age of the skulls. Best estimates date the skull to be at least 580,000 years old. This research, done in 2001 estimates the age of the skulls to be 270,000 years older than previous estimates, executed with the use of different dating methods like electron spin resonance dating and alpha-counting U-series. However, by using mass spectrometric U-series dating, the age for the tooth found on the Nanjing site was estimated to be only 400,000 years old. Researchers proposed that the enamel used to date the tooth may not have the same uranium uptake as the skulls, leading to the discrepancy in estimated age. Another study from 1999 estimated one skull to be at least 500,000 years old, while they date the other skull being between 250,000 and 500,000 years old using TIMS dating. The most recent analysis using U-series and coupled ESR/U-series dating methods finds the age of Nanjing Craniums I and II to be 639 ± 27 ka and 652 ± 26 ka, respectively.

== Impact of the Nanjing fossils ==
Homo erectus occupation of Eastern Asia was an established idea well before the discovery of Homo erectus from Nanjing. Nanjing Man is one of several middle Pleistocene dated Homo erectus fossil finds in eastern China, the most well-known of which is Peking Man. However dating the Nanjing Man fossils between 580,000 YA and 620,000 YA pushed the estimate for Homo erectus colonisation of eastern Asia almost 270,000 years earlier.

The Nanjing Man fossil discovery coincided with the paleoanthropological debate on the population dynamics of modern humans and their relation to other species of the genus Homo. The extended occupation of East Asia by Homo erectus suggested by the dating of the Nanjing fossils supports the hypothesis that Homo erectus lived in Asia before pre-modern Homo sapiens existed. A scientific consensus on the dispersal of Homo sapiens throughout the globe was reached in the early 21st century. However, the influence of East Asian Homo erectus on modern human ancestry remains unclear.

Morphological features of the Nanjing Man fossils such as cranial capacity and the size of various cranial metrics differ significantly from other Chinese hominins. Despite this, morphometric and morphological features fall well within the range expected for Homo erectus. A high diversity in cranial morphological features in Chinese Homo erectus has been identified in a number of studies

== Present location ==
The skull fragments collected at Hulu Cave are currently displayed the Nanjing Homo erectus fossil museum, along with other educational information about Nanjing man and the colonisation of China by Homo erectus.
