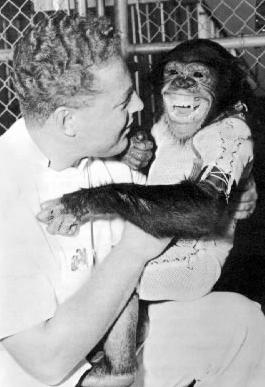
- Two hominins: A human holding a chimpanzee (Joseph V. Brady and Ham the chimp)

Scientific classification
- Kingdom: Animalia
- Phylum: Chordata
- Class: Mammalia
- Order: Primates
- Superfamily: Hominoidea
- Family: Hominidae
- Subfamily: Homininae
- Tribe: Hominini; Arambourg, 1948

Type genus
- Homo Linnaeus, 1758

Genera
- Panina; Pan; Australopithecina/Hominina; †Australopithecus (paraphyletic); †Kenyanthropus (cladistically included); †Paranthropus (cladistically included); Homo (cladistically included); †Ardipithecus; †Orrorin; †Sahelanthropus?

= Hominini =

Hominini Temporal range: 7–0 Ma

Tribe of mammals

The Hominini (hominins) form a taxonomic tribe of the subfamily Homininae (hominines). They comprise two extant genera: Homo (humans) and Pan (chimpanzees and bonobos), and in standard usage exclude the genus Gorilla (gorillas), which is grouped separately within the subfamily Homininae.

The term Hominini was originally introduced by Camille Arambourg (1948), who combined the categories of Hominina and Simiina pursuant to Gray's classifications (1825).

Taxonomic classification of the superfamily Hominoidea (hominoids), emphasizing the tribe Hominini. This tribe (lower left in graphic) comprises two genera, Homo and Pan; while gorillas are classified as separate from these—as the single genus Gorilla of tribe Gorillini; all of subfamily Homininae.

Traditionally, chimpanzees, gorillas and orangutans were grouped together, excluding humans, as pongids. Since Gray's classifications, evidence accumulating from genetic phylogeny confirmed that humans, chimpanzees, and gorillas are more closely related to each other than to the orangutan. The orangutans were reassigned to the family Hominidae (great apes), which already included humans; and the gorillas were grouped as a separate tribe (Gorillini) of the subfamily Homininae. Still, details of this reassignment remain contested, and of publishing since (on tribe Hominini), not every source excludes gorillas and not every source includes chimpanzees.

Humans are the only extant species in the Australopithecine branch (subtribe), which also contains many extinct close relatives of humans.

== Terminology and definition ==
Concerning membership, when Hominini is taken to exclude Pan, Panini ("panins") may refer to the tribe containing Pan as its only genus. Or perhaps place Pan with other dryopithecine genera, making the whole tribe or subtribe of Panini or Panina together. Minority dissenting nomenclatures include Gorilla in Hominini and Pan in Homo (Goodman et al. 1998), or both Pan and Gorilla in Homo (Watson et al. 2001).

By convention, the adjectival term "hominin" (or nominalized "hominins") refers to the tribe Hominini, whereas the members of the subtribe Hominina (and thus all archaic human species) are referred to as "homininan" ("homininans"). This follows the proposal by Mann and Weiss (1996), which presents tribe Hominini as including both Pan and Homo, placed in separate subtribes. The genus Pan is referred to subtribe Panina, and genus Homo is included in the subtribe Hominina (see below).

The alternative convention uses "hominin" to exclude members of Panina: for Homo; or for human and australopithecine species. This alternative convention is referenced in e.g. Coyne (2009) and in Dunbar (2014). Potts (2010) in addition uses the name Hominini in a different sense, as excluding Pan, and uses "hominins" for this, while a separate tribe (rather than subtribe) for chimpanzees is introduced, under the name Panini. In this recent convention, contra Arambourg, the term "hominin" is applied to Homo, Australopithecus, Ardipithecus, and others that arose after the split from the line that led to chimpanzees (see cladogram below); that is, they distinguish fossil members on the human side of the split, as "hominins", from those on the chimpanzee side, as "not hominins" (or "non-hominin hominids").

== Cladogram ==
This cladogram shows the clade of superfamily Hominoidea and its descendant clades, focused on the division of Hominini (omitting detail on clades not ancestral to Hominini). The family Hominidae ("hominids") comprises the subfamily Ponginae (which includes orangutans) and the tribes Gorillini (including gorillas) and Hominini, the latter two forming the subfamily of Homininae. Hominini is divided into Panina (chimpanzees) and Australopithecina (australopithecines). The Hominina (humans) are usually held to have emerged within the Australopithecina (which would roughly correspond to the alternative definition of Hominini according to the alternative definition that excludes Pan).

Genetic analysis combined with fossil evidence indicates that hominoids diverged from the Old World monkeys about 25 million years ago (Mya), near the Oligocene-Miocene boundary. The most recent common ancestors (MRCA) of the subfamilies Homininae and Ponginae lived about 15 million years ago. The best-known fossil genus of Ponginae is Sivapithecus, consisting of several species from 12.5 million to 8.5 million years ago. It differs from orangutans in dentition and postcranial morphology. In the following cladogram, the approximate time the clades radiated newer clades is indicated in millions of years ago (Mya).

- Hominoidea (20.4 Mya)
  - Hylobatidae (gibbons)
  - Hominidae (15.7)
    - Ponginae (orangutans)
    - Homininae (8.8)
      - Gorillini (gorillas)
      - Hominini (6.3)
        - Panina (chimpanzees)
        - Hominina (4) Australopithecina
          - Ardipithecus (†)
          - Australopithecus
            - Praeanthropus (†)
            - - Australopithecus/Paranthropus robustus (†2)
              - - Australopithecus garhi (†2.5)
                - Homo (humans)

== Evolutionary history ==
Hominin timeline
← / Earlier apes; ← / Gorilla split; ← / Chimpanzee split; ← / Earliest bipedal; ← / Earliest sign of Ardipithecus; ← / Earliest sign of Australopithecus; ← / Earliest stone tools; ← / Earliest sign of Homo; ← / Dispersal beyond Africa; ← / Earliest fire / cooking; ← / Earliest rock art; ← / Earliest clothes; ← / Modern humans
(million years ago)

Both Sahelanthropus and Orrorin existed during the estimated duration of the ancestral chimpanzee–human speciation events, within the range of eight to four million years ago (Mya). Very few fossil specimens have been found that can be considered directly ancestral to genus Pan. News of the first fossil chimpanzee, found in Kenya, was published in 2005. However, it is dated to very recent times—between 545 and 284 thousand years ago. The divergence of a "proto-human" or "pre-human" lineage separate from Pan appears to have been a process of complex speciation-hybridization rather than a clean split, taking place over the period of anywhere between 13 Mya (close to the age of the tribe Hominini itself) and some 4 Mya. Different chromosomes appear to have split at different times, with broad-scale hybridization activity occurring between the two emerging lineages as late as the period 6.3 to 5.4 Mya, according to Patterson et al. (2006), This research group noted that one hypothetical late hybridization period was based in particular on the similarity of X chromosomes in the proto-humans and stem chimpanzees, suggesting that the final divergence was even as recent as 4 Mya. Wakeley (2008) rejected these hypotheses; he suggested alternative explanations, including selection pressure on the X chromosome in the ancestral populations prior to the chimpanzee–human last common ancestor (CHLCA).

Most DNA studies find that humans and Pan are 99% identical, but one study found only 94% commonality, with some of the difference occurring in non-coding DNA. It is most likely that the australopithecines, dating from 4.4 to 3 Mya, evolved into the earliest members of genus Homo. In the year 2000, the discovery of Orrorin tugenensis, dated as early as 6.2 Mya, briefly challenged critical elements of that hypothesis, as it suggested that Homo did not in fact derive from australopithecine ancestors.

All the listed fossil genera are evaluated for two traits that could identify them as hominins:

1. probability of being ancestral to Homo, and
2. whether they are more closely related to Homo than to any other living primate.

Some, including Paranthropus, Ardipithecus, and Australopithecus, are broadly thought to be ancestral and closely related to Homo; others, especially earlier genera, including Sahelanthropus (and perhaps Orrorin), are supported by one community of scientists but doubted by another.

== List of known hominin species ==
- Sahelanthropus tchadensis
- Orrorin tugenensis
- Ardipithecus kadabba
- Ardipithecus ramidus
- Australopithecus anamensis
- Australopithecus afarensis
- Australopithecus deyiremeda
- Australopithecus garhi
- Kenyanthropus platyops
- Australopithecus africanus
- Australopithecus sediba
- Paranthropus aethiopicus
- Paranthropus boisei
- Paranthropus robustus
- Pan troglodytes (extant)
- Pan paniscus (extant)
- Homo habilis
- Homo rudolfensis
- Homo ergaster
- Homo erectus
- Homo antecessor
- Homo heidelbergensis
- Homo naledi
- Homo neanderthalensis
- Homo denisova
- Homo sapiens (extant)
- Homo floresiensis
- Homo luzonensis

== Gallery ==
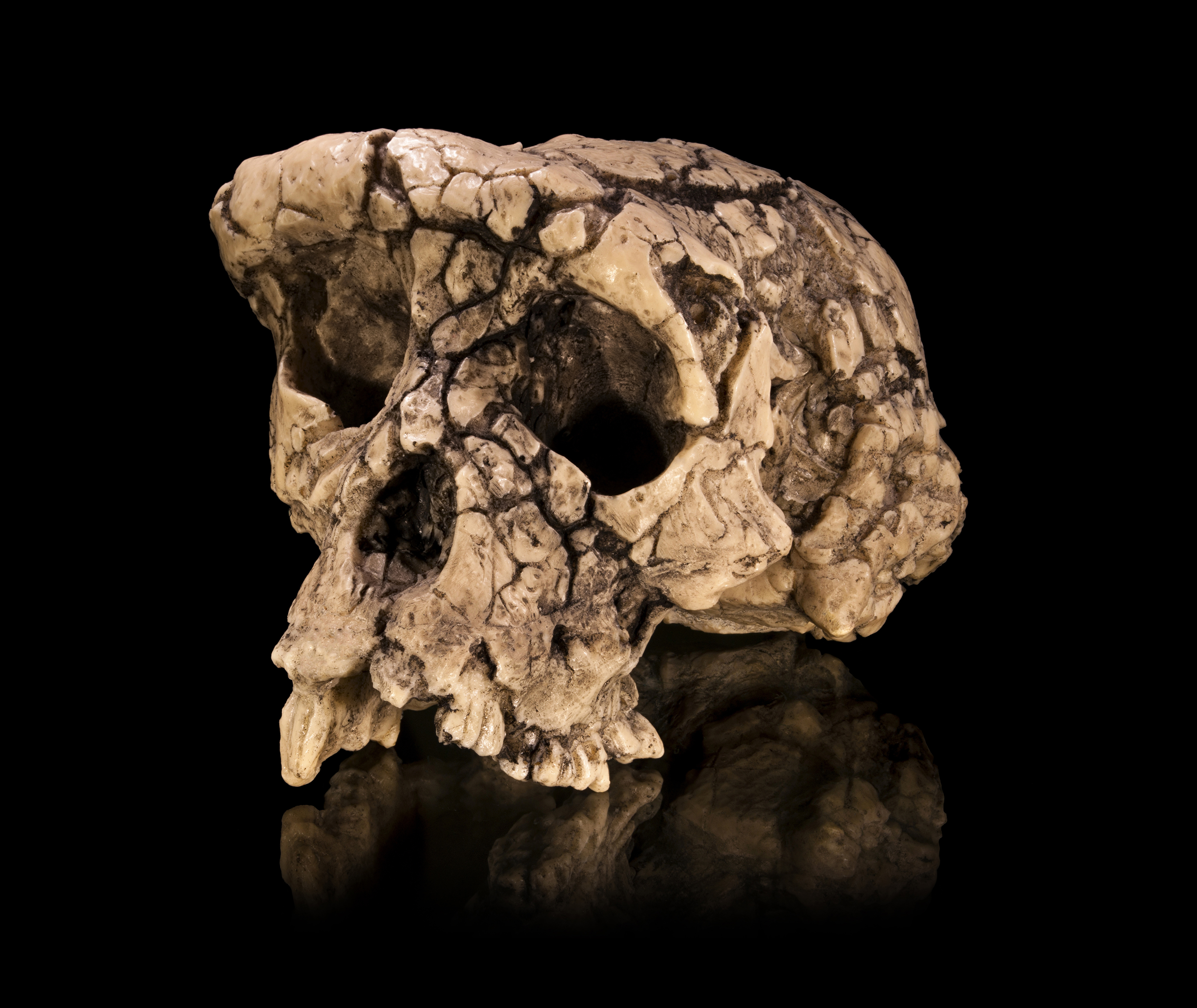
Cast of a skull of Sahelanthropus tchadensis, nick-named ″Toumaï″

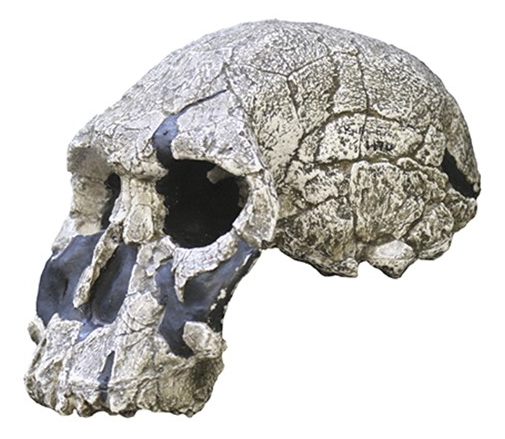
Skull of Homo rudolfensis

== See also ==
- History of hominoid taxonomy
- Human evolution
- Human taxonomy
- Human timeline
- List of human evolution fossils
