= Chimpanzee–human last common ancestor =

The chimpanzee–human last common ancestor (CHLCA) is the last common ancestor shared by the extant Homo (human) and Pan (chimpanzee and bonobo) genera of Hominini. Estimates of the divergence date vary widely from thirteen to five million years ago.

In human genetic studies, the CHLCA is useful as an anchor point for calculating single-nucleotide polymorphism (SNP) rates in human populations where chimpanzees are used as an outgroup, that is, as the extant species most genetically similar to Homo sapiens.

Despite extensive research, no direct fossil evidence of the CHLCA has been discovered. Fossil candidates like Sahelanthropus tchadensis, Orrorin tugenensis, and Ardipithecus ramidus have been debated as being either early hominins or close to the CHLCA. However, their classification remains uncertain because of incomplete evidence.

== Taxonomy ==
- Hominoidea (hominoids, apes)
  - Hylobatidae (gibbons)
  - Hominidae (hominids, great apes)
    - Ponginae
      - (orangutans)
    - Homininae
      - Gorillini
        - (gorillas)
      - Hominini
        - Panina
          - (chimpanzees/bonobos)
        - - Hominina (humans)

The taxon tribe Hominini was proposed to separate humans (genus Homo) from chimpanzees (Pan) and gorillas (genus Gorilla) on the notion that the least similar species should be separated from the other two. However, later evidence revealed that Pan and Homo are closer genetically than are Pan and Gorilla; thus, Pan was referred to the tribe Hominini with Homo. Gorilla now became the separated genus and was referred to the new taxon tribe Gorillini.

Mann and Weiss (1996), proposed that the tribe Hominini should encompass Pan and Homo, grouped in separate subtribes. They classified Homo and all bipedal apes in the subtribe Hominina and Pan in the subtribe Panina. (Wood (2010) discussed the different views of this taxonomy.) A "chimpanzee clade" was posited by Wood and Richmond, who referred it to a tribe Panini, which was envisioned from the family Hominidae being composed of a trifurcation of subfamilies.

Richard Wrangham (2001) argued that the CHLCA species was very similar to the common chimpanzee (Pan troglodytes) – so much so that it should be classified as a member of the genus Pan and be given the taxonomic name Pan prior.

All the human-related genera of tribe Hominini that arose after divergence from Pan are members of the subtribe Hominina, including the genera Homo and Australopithecus. This group represents "the human clade" and its members are called "hominins".

== Fossil evidence ==
No fossil has yet conclusively been identified as the CHLCA.

Sahelanthropus tchadensis is an extinct hominine with some morphology proposed (and disputed) to be as expected of the CHLCA, and it lived some 7 million years ago — close to the time of the chimpanzee–human divergence. But it is unclear whether it should be classified as a member of the tribe Hominini, that is, a hominin, as an ancestor of Homo and Pan and a potential candidate for the CHLCA species itself, or simply a Miocene ape with some convergent anatomical similarity to many later hominins.

Ardipithecus most likely appeared after the human-chimpanzee split, some 5.5 million years ago, at a time when gene flow may still have been ongoing. It has several shared characteristics with chimpanzees, but due to its fossil incompleteness and the proximity to the human-chimpanzee split, the exact position of Ardipithecus in the fossil record is unclear. However, Sarmiento (2010), noting that Ardipithecus does not share any characteristics exclusive to humans and some of its characteristics (those in the wrist and basicranium), suggested that it may have diverged from the common human/African ape stock prior to the human, chimpanzee and gorilla divergence.

Orrorin, which lived roughly 6 million years ago, seems, based on the fossils that were recovered, to share no derived features of hominoid great-ape relatives. In contrast, "Orrorin seems to share several apomorphic features with modern humans, as well as some with australopithecines, including the presence of an obturator externus groove, elongated femoral neck, anteriorly twisted head (posterior twist in Australopithecus), anteroposteriorly compressed femoral neck, asymmetric distribution of cortex in the femoral neck, shallow superior notch, and a well developed gluteal tuberosity which coalesces vertically with the crest that descends the femoral shaft posteriorly." It does, however, also share many of such properties with several Miocene ape species, even showing some transitional elements between basal apes like the Aegyptopithecus and Australopithecus.

Another candidate that has been suggested is Graecopithecus, though this claim is largely disputed as there is insufficient evidence to support the determination of Graecopithecus as hominin or hominin-related.

Few fossil specimens on the "chimpanzee-side" of the split have been found; the first fossil chimpanzee, dating between 545 and 284 kyr (thousand years, radiometric), was discovered in Kenya's East African Rift Valley (McBrearty, 2005). Both Orrorin and Sahelanthropus existed around the time of the divergence, and so either one or both may be ancestral to both genera Homo and Pan.

Due to the scarcity of fossil evidence for CHLCA candidates, Mounier (2016) presented a project to create a "virtual fossil" by applying digital "morphometrics" and statistical algorithms to fossils from across the evolutionary history of both Homo and Pan, having previously used this technique to visualize a skull of the last common ancestor of Neanderthal and Homo sapiens.

== Age estimates ==
An estimate of 10 to 13 million years for the CHLCA was proposed in 1998, and a range of 7 to 10 million years ago is assumed by White and colleagues in 2009. A 2016 study analyzed transitions at CpG sites in genome sequences, which exhibit a more clocklike behavior than other substitutions, arriving at an estimate for human and chimpanzee divergence time of between 9.3 and 6.5 million years ago.

Studies in the 2020s suggest a more recent divergence time, such as between 6.6 and 4.7 million years ago in a 2022 article. In a 2025 paper in comparative genomics, the complete telomere-to-telomere sequences of six hominoid genomes were used to estimate the CHLCA split as between 6.3 and 5.5 million years ago. By contrast, a 2026 meta-analysis of molecular estimates published from 1967 to 2023 found that they have drifted older over the decades, with genome-based estimates old enough to fit the accepted hominin fossil record putting the split at about 8 million years ago, with a 99.5% probability that it happened more than 7 million years ago.

== Gene flow ==
Determining the precise timing of the Pan–Homo split is complicated by evidence suggesting a more complex speciation process than a simple, clean divergence between the two lineages. Different chromosomes appear to have separated at different times, possibly over a period of up to 4 million years, indicating a prolonged and gradual speciation process with ongoing interactions between the lineages. This extended divergence included significant gene flow between the two emerging lineages as recently as 6.3 to 5.4 million years ago, according to Patterson et al. (2006).

Speciation between Pan and Homo occurred over the last 9 million years. Ardipithecus probably branched off of the Pan lineage in the middle Miocene Messinian. After the original divergences, there were, according to Patterson (2006), periods of gene flow between population groups and a process of alternating divergence and gene flow that lasted several million years. Some time during the late Miocene or early Pliocene, the earliest members of the human clade completed a final separation from the lineage of Pan – with date estimates ranging from 13 million to as recent as 4 million years ago. The latter date was in particular based on the similarity of the X chromosome in humans and chimpanzees, a conclusion rejected as unwarranted by Wakeley (2008), who suggested alternative explanations, including selection pressure on the X chromosome in the populations ancestral to the CHLCA. (Note: "Patterson et al. suggest that the apparently short divergence time between humans and chimpanzees on the X chromosome is explained by a massive interspecific gene flow event in the ancestry of these two species. However, Patterson et al. do not statistically test their own null model of simple speciation before concluding that speciation was complex, and—even if the null model could be rejected—they do not consider other explanations of a short divergence time on the X chromosome. These include natural selection on the X chromosome in the common ancestor of humans and chimpanzees, changes in the ratio of male-to-female mutation rates over time, and less extreme divergence versions with gene flow. I, therefore, believe that their claim of gene flow is unwarranted.")

Complex speciation and incomplete lineage sorting of genetic sequences seem to also have happened in the split between the human lineage and that of the gorilla, indicating "messy" speciation is the rule rather than the exception in large primates. Such a scenario would explain why the divergence age between the Homo and Pan has varied with the chosen method and why a single point has so far been hard to track down.

== See also ==
- History of hominoid taxonomy
- List of human evolution fossils (with images)
- Gorilla–human last common ancestor
