= Yuanmou Man =

Yuanmou Man Temporal range: Early Pleistocene, 1.7 Ma
- Upper incisors, Geological Museum of China

Scientific classification
- Kingdom: Animalia
- Phylum: Chordata
- Class: Mammalia
- Order: Primates
- Superfamily: Hominoidea
- Family: Hominidae
- Genus: Homo
- Species: †H. erectus
- Subspecies: †H. e. yuanmouensis

Trinomial name
- †Homo erectus yuanmouensis Hu et al., 1973

Subspecies of Homo erectus

Yuanmou Man (simplified Chinese: 元谋人; traditional Chinese: 元謀人; pinyin: Yuánmóu Rén, Homo erectus yuanmouensis) is a subspecies of H. erectus which inhabited the Yuanmou Basin in Yunnan Province, southwestern China, roughly 1.7 million years ago. It is one of the earliest human specimens of China. Yuanmou Man is known only from two upper first incisors presumed to have belonged to a male, and a partial tibia presumed to have belonged to a female. The female may have stood about 123.6–130.4 cm (4 ft 1 in – 4 ft 3 in) in life. These remains are anatomically quite similar to those contemporary early Homo in Africa, namely H. habilis and H. (e?) ergaster.

Yuanmou Man inhabited a mixed environment featuring grassland, bushland, marshland, and forest dominated by pine and alder. They lived alongside chalicotheres, deer, the elephant Stegodon, rhinoceros, cattle, pigs, and the giant short-faced hyaena. The site currently sits at an elevation of 1,050–1,150 m (3,440–3,770 ft). They manufactured simple cores, flakes, choppers, pointed tools, and scrapers which paralleled the technology of their African contemporaries.

== Taxonomy ==
=== Discovery ===
On May 1, 1965, geologist Qian Fang recovered two archaic human upper first incisors (catalogue number V1519) from fossiliferous deposits of the Yuanmou Basin near Shangnabang village, Yuanmou County, Yunnan Province, China. When they were formally described in 1973, they were determined to have belonged to a young male. Qian's field team was funded by the Chinese Academy of Geosciences. The Institute of Vertebrate Paleontology and Paleoanthropology funded further excavation of the site, and reported 16 stone tools, of which six were found in situ and 10 nearby.

The Yuanmou Basin sits just to the southeast of the Tibetan Plateau, and is the lowest basin on the central Yunnan–Guizhou Plateau at an elevation of 1,050–1,150 m (3,440–3,770 ft). The Yuanmou Formation is divided into four members and 28 layers. The human teeth were discovered in the silty clay and sandy conglomerates of Member 4 (the uppermost member) near the bottom of layer 25.

In December 1984, a field team dispatched by the Beijing Natural History Museum to survey the Guojiabao site, just 250 m (820 ft) away from the original Yuanmou Man teeth, unearthed a left human tibial shaft in a layer just overlying layer 25 in Member 4. The tibia was described in 1991, and was determined to belong to a young female H. e. yuanmouensis.

=== Age ===
Location of Yuanmou County

The Yuanmou Formation has been identified as a fossil-bearing site since the 1920s, and palaeontological work on the area suggest a Lower Pleistocene age. Because the formation is faulted (several rock masses have been displaced), biostratigraphy (dating an area based on animal remains) of the human-bearing layer is impossible.

In 1976, Li Pu and colleagues palaeomagnetically dated the incisors to the Gilsa geomagnetic polarity event (when the Earth's magnetic polarity reversed for a short interval) roughly 1.7 million years ago. In 1977, with a much larger sample size, Cheng Guoliang and colleagues instead placed the area during the Olduvai subchron, and dated it to 1.64–1.63 million years ago. In 1979, Li Renwei and Lin Daxing measured the alloisoleucine/isoleucine protein ratio in animal bones and produced a date of 0.8 million years ago for the Yuanmou Man. In 1983, Liu Dongsheng and Ding Menglin—using palaeomagnetism, biostratigraphy, and lithostratigraphy—reported a date of 0.6–0.5 million years ago during the Middle Pleistocene, despite the animal remains pointing to an older date. In 1988, Q. Z. Liang agreed with Cheng on dating it to the Olduvai subchron. In 1991, Qian and Guo Xing Zhou came to the same conclusion as Liang. In 1998, R. Grün and colleagues, using electron spin resonance dating on 14 horse and rhino teeth, calculated an interval of 1.6–1.1 million years ago. In 2002, Masayuki Hyodo and colleagues, using palaeomagnetism, reported a date of 0.7 million years ago near the Matuyama–Brunhes geomagnetic boundary during the Middle Pleistocene. Later that year, the boundary was re-dated to 0.79–0.78 million years ago by geophysicist Brad Singer and colleagues. In 2003, Ri Xiang Zhu and colleagues made note of the inconsistency among previous palaeomagnetic studies, and in 2008 palaeomagnetically dated it to roughly 1.7 million years ago. They believed Middle Pleistocene dates were probably caused by too small a sample size. The tibia was probably found somewhere in layers 25–28, and by Zhu's calculations would date to 1.7–1.4 million years ago.

The date of 1.7 million years ago is widely cited. This makes the Yuanmou Man one of the earliest fossil human specimens in China, and roughly contemporaneous with the oldest humans in Southeast Asia. It was part of a major expansion of H. erectus across Asia, the species extending from 40°N in Xiaochangliang to 7°S in Java, and inhabiting temperate grassland to tropical woodland. The Yuanmou Man is only slightly younger than the Yunxian Man, the earliest identified Chinese human specimen at 1.77 million years old. Yuanmou Man could also indicate humans dispersed from south to north across China, but there are too few other well-constrained early Chinese sites to test this hypothesis. Humans likely already settled in China at earliest 2.12 million years ago evidenced by stone tools recovered from the Loess Plateau in northwestern China.

=== Classification ===
The teeth were formally described in 1973 by Chinese palaeoanthropologist Hu Chengzhi, who identified it as a new subspecies of Homo erectus, distinct from and much more archaic than the Middle Pleistocene Peking Man, H. ("Sinanthropus") e. pekinensis, from Beijing. He named it H. ("S.") e. yuanmouensis, and believed it represents an early stage in the evolution of Chinese H. erectus. In 1985, Chinese palaeoanthropologist Wu Rukang said that few authors in the field recognise H. e. yuanmouensis as valid, with most favouring there having been only one subspecies of H. erectus which inhabited China. However, in 2011, Indonesian palaeoanthropologist Yahdi Zaim and colleagues, based on dental comparisons, concluded that the Sangiran H. erectus—which had colonised Java by 1.6 million years ago—had descended from a different dispersal event than the Peking Man who had colonised China by 780,000 years ago. The Sangiran teeth were notably more reminiscent of the early H. habilis from Africa than those of the Peking Man. This would mean that H. erectus dispersed across East Asia multiple times.

== Anatomy ==
For the teeth, only the left and right first incisors are preserved for the Yuanmou Man. The left incisor measures 11.4 mm (0.45 in) in breadth and 8.1 mm (0.32 in) in width, and the right incisor 11.5 mm (0.45 in) and 8.6 mm (0.34 in). The incisors are overall robust. They notably flare out in breadth from bottom to top. The labial (lip) side is mostly flat with the exception of some grooves and depressions, and the base is somewhat convex like that of the Peking Man. The lingual (tongue) side caves in like that of the Peking Man, but has a defined ridge running down the middle like H. (e?) ergaster and H. habilis. The cross section at the neck of the tooth (at the gum line) is nearly elliptical. Similar anatomy is also exhibited in Late Pleistocene archaic human specimens from Xujiayao, China; and Neanderthals from Krapina, Croatia.

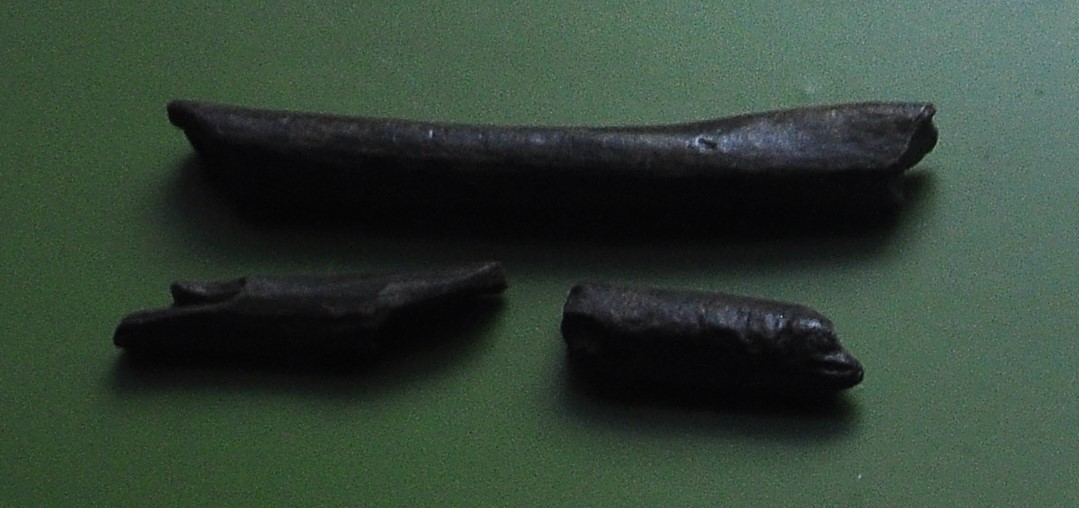
The Yuanmou tibia

The tibia is a 227-millimetre-long (8.9 in) mid-shaft fragment. It is gracile and laterally (on the sides) flattened. The anterior (front) aspect is round and obtuse, and has a weak S-curve. The interosseous crest (which separates the muscles on the back of the leg from those of the front of the leg) is shallow. On the posterior (back) aspect, there is a ridge running down the middle, developed attachment (where the muscle used to attach to the bone) for the flexor digitorum longus muscle (which flexes the toes), and a defined soleal line. It is somewhat similar to tibiae assigned to H. habilis. Like other H. erectus, the tibia is quite thick, constricting the medullary cavity where the bone marrow is stored. At the probable midpoint of the shaft, the circumference is 78 mm (3.1 in), the breadth from left to right is 17 mm (0.67 in), and from front to back is 29 mm (1.1 in). The individual may have stood roughly 123.6–130.4 cm (4 ft 1 in – 4 ft 3 in).

== Culture ==
=== Palaeohabitat ===
A total of 35 other animals have been reported from layer 25. The mammals are: the chalicothere Nestoritherium; the deer Cervocerus ultimus, Procapreolus stenosis, Paracervulus attenuatus, Rusa yunnanensis, Cervus stehlini, Muntiacus lacustris, M. nanus, gazelle, and chital; cattle; pigs; the elephant Stegodon; rhino; the giant short-faced hyaena Pachycrocuta brevirostris licenti; pika; and small rodents. Various mollusks, turtles, crustaceans, and plants were also found. Fossil pollen deposits on the Yuanmou teeth and artefacts can largely be assigned to herbaceous plants, pine, and alder. Altogether, they suggest Yuanmou Man inhabited a mixed environment featuring open grassland, bushland, forest, marshland, and freshwater, not unlike what is suggested for the Dmanisi hominins.

=== Technology ===
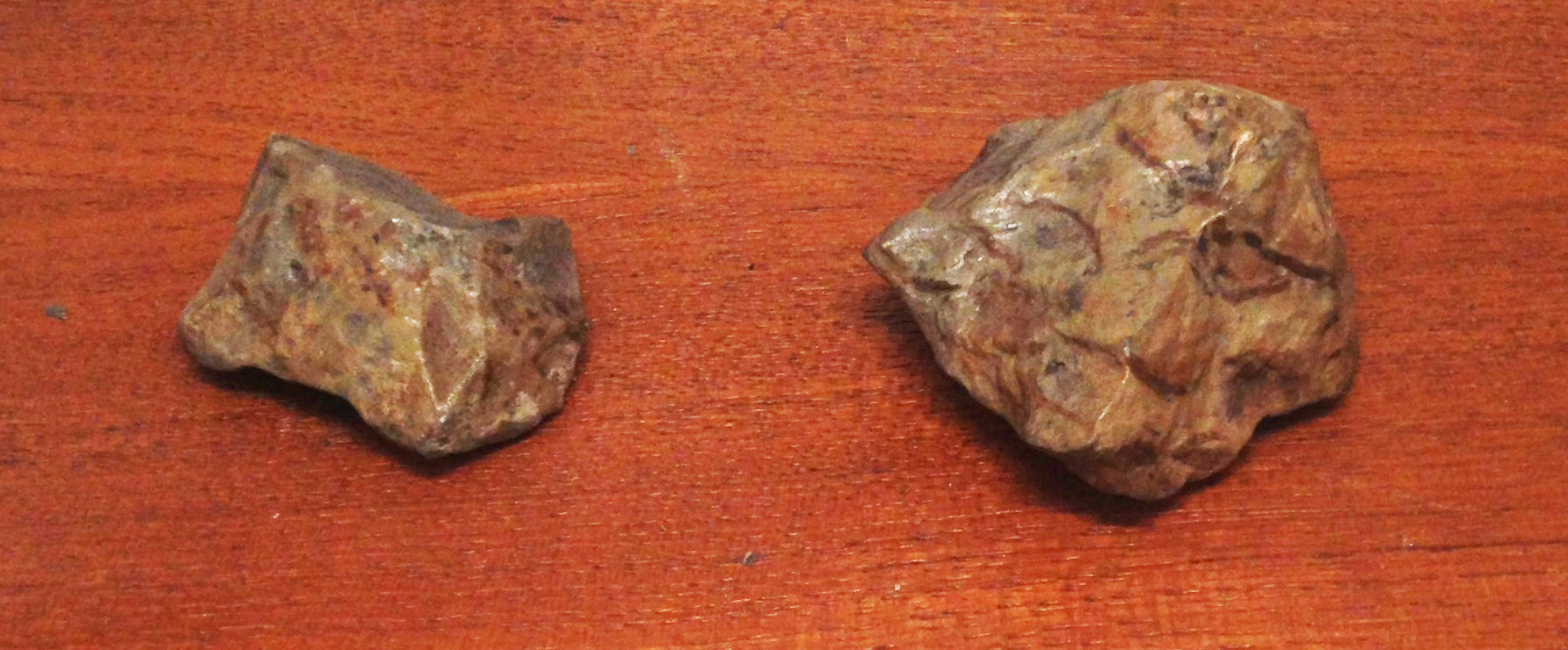
Stone tools from Yuanmou

In 1973, three retouched tools were found within 20 m (66 ft) of the incisors, two of them in a layer 50 cm (20 in) in elevation below the incisors, and an additional one about 1 m (3 ft 3 in) above the incisors. Three similar tools were recovered at the surface of the Shangnabang site. Within 15 km (9.3 mi), cores, flakes, choppers, pointed tools, and scrapers were found, totaling 16 tools. They were made of quartz and quartzite probably gathered from the nearby river. Most were modified with direct hammering (using a hammerstone to flake off pieces), but a few were modified with the bipolar technique (smashing the core with the hammerstone, creating several flakes). The tools feature simple conchoidal fracture, not unlike contemporary Oldowan tools from Africa.

In 1985, Chinese palaeoanthropologist Jia Lanpo described two probably burnt mammal bones as well as considerable charcoal remnants from Yuanmou. He suggested this could represent extremely early fire usage by humans. These bones and similarly aged burnt remnants from various parts of the world are now considered to be the products of natural wildfires, making it unlikely that the Peking Man was using fire.
