= Paleolithic =

Prehistoric period, first part of the Stone Age

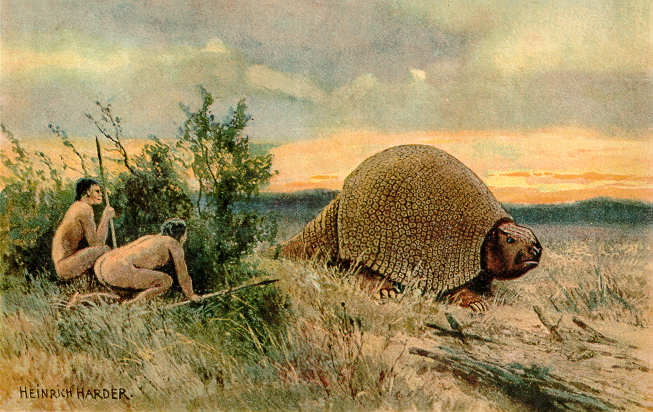
Hunting a Glyptodon. Painting by Heinrich Harder c. 1920.

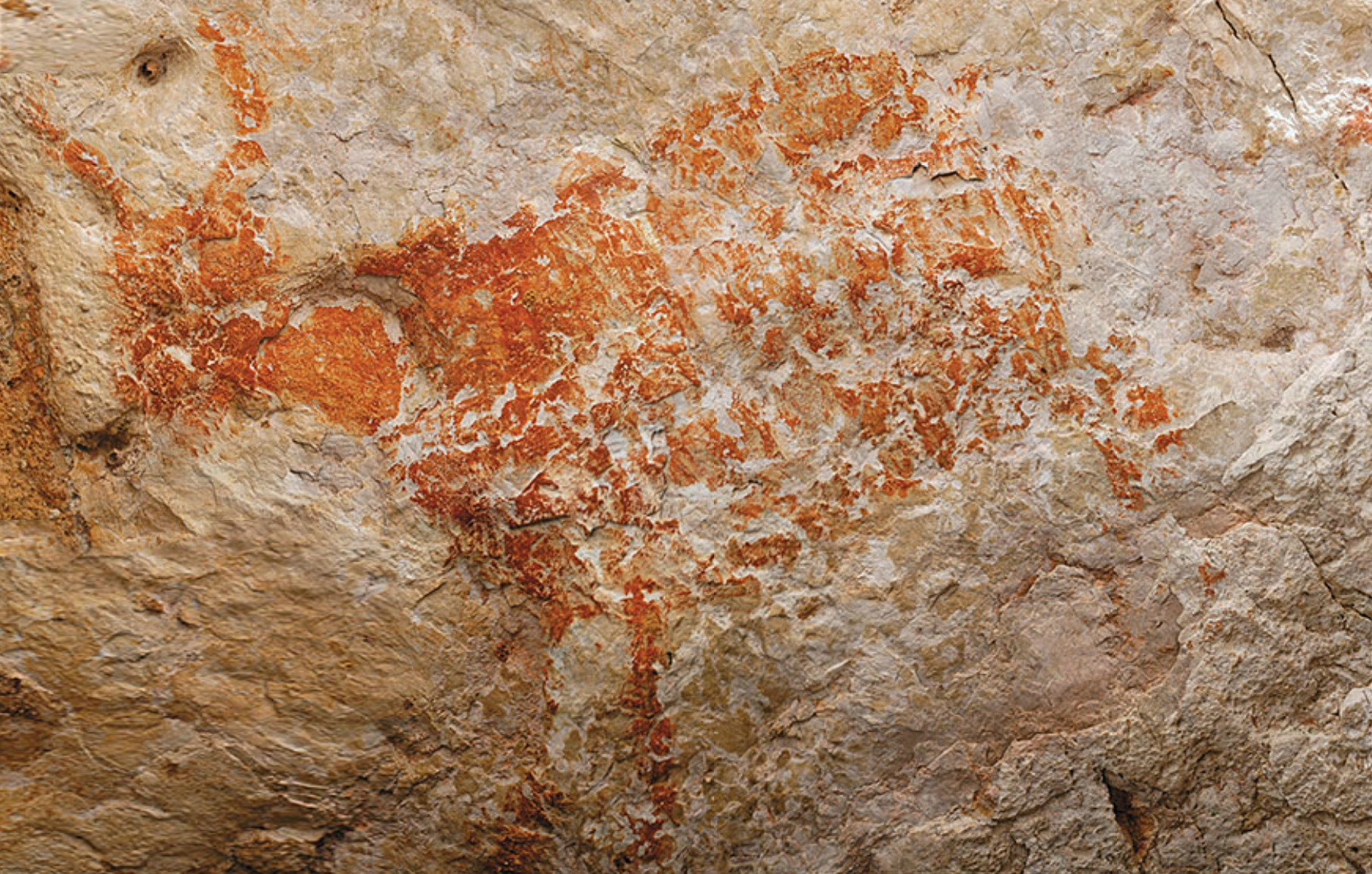
The oldest known figurative painting is a depiction of a bull that was discovered in the Lubang Jeriji Saléh cave in Indonesia. It was painted 40,000–52,000 years ago or earlier.

The Paleolithic (/ˌpeɪlioʊˈlɪθɪk, ˌpæli-/ PAY-lee-oh-LITH-ik, PAL-ee-), or Old Stone Age, is a period in human prehistory distinguished by the original development of stone tools. It represents almost the entire period of human prehistoric technology, extending from the earliest known use of stone tools by hominins, c. 3.3 million years ago, to the end of the Pleistocene, c. 11,650 cal BP.

The Paleolithic Age in Europe preceded the Mesolithic Age, although the date of the transition varies geographically by several thousand years. During the Paleolithic Age, hominins grouped together in small societies such as bands and subsisted by gathering plants, fishing, and hunting or scavenging wild animals. The Paleolithic Age is characterized by the use of knapped stone tools, although at the time humans also used wood and bone tools. Other organic commodities were adapted for use as tools, including leather and vegetable fibers; however, due to rapid decomposition, these have not survived to any great degree.

About 50,000 years ago, a marked increase in the diversity of artifacts occurred. In Africa, bone artifacts and the first art appear in the archaeological record. The first evidence of human fishing is also noted, from artifacts in places such as Blombos Cave in South Africa. Archaeologists classify artifacts of the last 50,000 years into many different categories, such as projectile points, engraving tools, sharp knife blades, and drilling and piercing tools.

Humankind gradually evolved from early members of the genus Homo—such as Homo habilis, who used simple stone tools—into anatomically modern humans as well as behaviourally modern humans by the Upper Paleolithic. During the end of the Paleolithic Age, specifically the Middle or Upper Paleolithic Age, humans began to produce the earliest works of art and to engage in religious or spiritual behavior such as burial and ritual. Conditions during the Paleolithic Age went through a set of glacial and interglacial periods in which the climate periodically fluctuated between warm and cool temperatures.

By c. 50,000 – c. 40,000 BP, the first humans set foot in Australia. By c. 45,000 BP, humans lived at 61°N latitude in Europe. By c. 30,000 BP, Japan was reached, and by c. 27,000 BP humans were present in Siberia, above the Arctic Circle. By the end of the Upper Paleolithic Age humans had crossed Beringia and expanded throughout the Americas continents.

== Etymology ==
The term "Palaeolithic" was coined by archaeologist John Lubbock in 1865. It derives from Greek: παλαιός, palaios, "old"; and λίθος, lithos, "stone", meaning "old age of the stone" or "Old Stone Age".

== Paleogeography and climate ==
Hominin timeline
← / Earlier apes; ← / Gorilla split; ← / Chimpanzee split; ← / Earliest bipedal; ← / Earliest sign of Ardipithecus; ← / Earliest sign of Australopithecus; ← / Earliest stone tools; ← / Earliest sign of Homo; ← / Dispersal beyond Africa; ← / Earliest fire / cooking; ← / Earliest rock art; ← / Earliest clothes; ← / Modern humans
(million years ago)

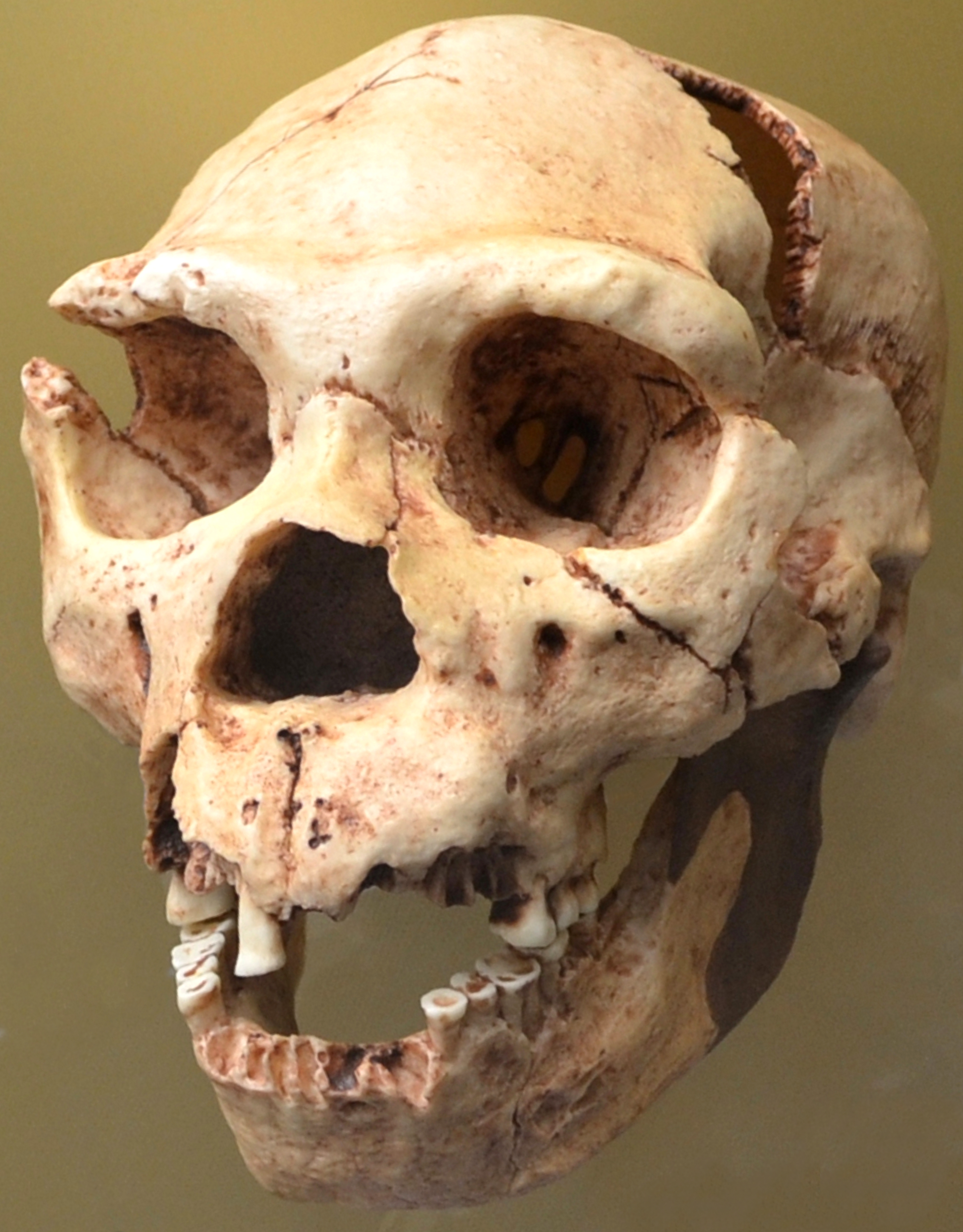
A skull of early Homo neanderthalensis, Miguelón from the Lower Paleolithic dated to 430,000 BP.

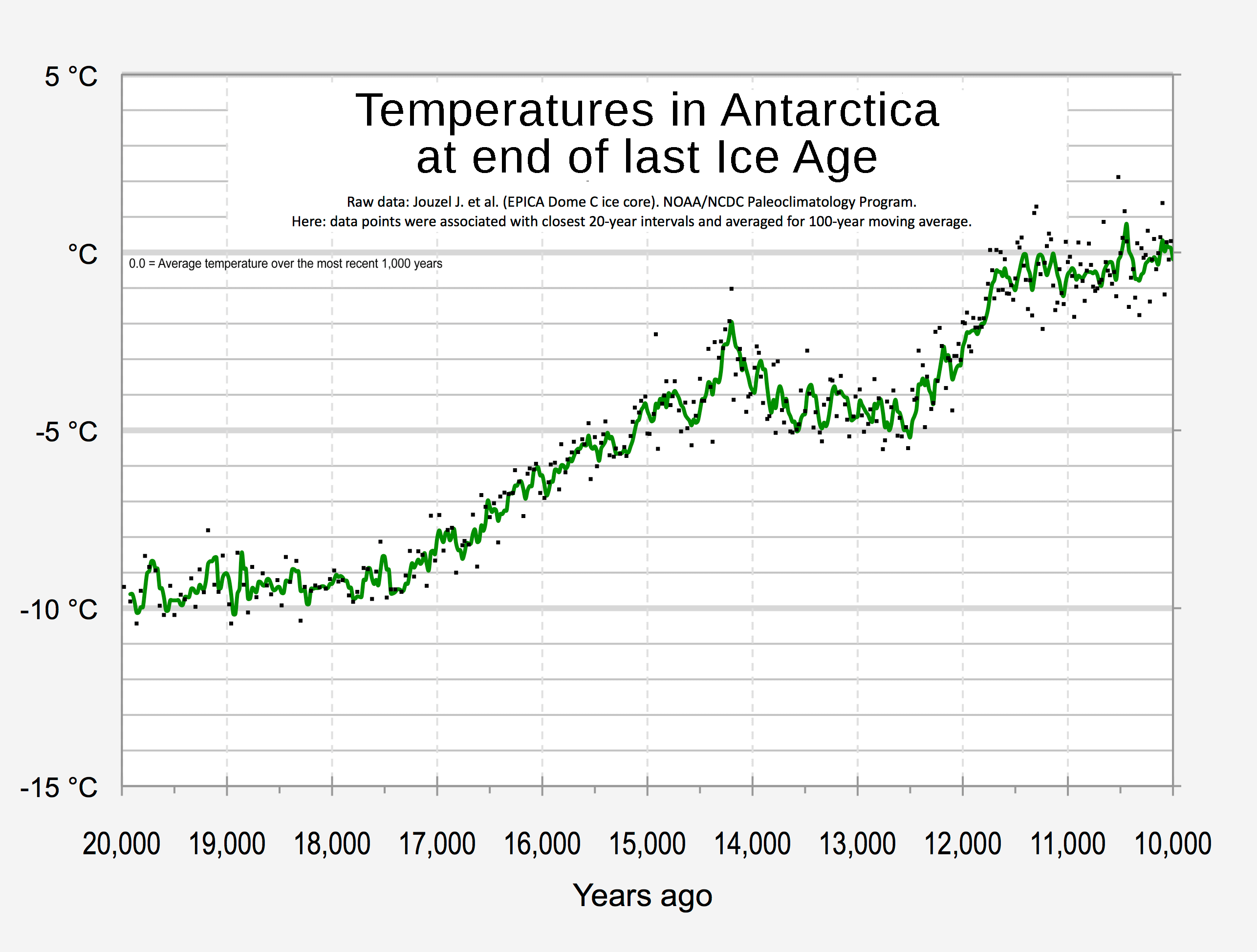
Temperature rise in Antarctica marking the end of the Paleolithic, as derived from ice core data.

The Paleolithic overlaps with the Pleistocene epoch of geologic time. Both ended 12,000 years ago although the Pleistocene started 2.6 million years ago, 700,000 years after the Paleolithic's start. This epoch experienced important geographic and climatic changes that affected human societies.

During the preceding Pliocene, continents had continued to drift from possibly as far as 250 km (160 mi) from their present locations to positions only 70 km (43 mi) from their current location. South America became linked to North America through the Isthmus of Panama, bringing a nearly complete end to South America's distinctive marsupial fauna. The formation of the isthmus had major consequences on global temperatures, because warm equatorial ocean currents were cut off, and the cold Arctic and Antarctic waters lowered temperatures in the now-isolated Atlantic Ocean.

Most of Central America formed during the Pliocene to connect the continents of North and South America, allowing fauna from these continents to leave their native habitats and colonize new areas. Africa's collision with Asia created the Mediterranean, cutting off the remnants of the Tethys Ocean. During the Pleistocene, the continents were essentially at their modern positions; the tectonic plates on which they sit have probably moved at most 100 km (62 mi) from each other since the beginning of the period.

Climates during the Pliocene became cooler and drier, and seasonal, similar to modern climates. Ice sheets grew on Antarctica. The formation of an Arctic ice cap around 3 million years ago is signaled by an abrupt shift in oxygen isotope ratios and ice-rafted cobbles in the North Atlantic and North Pacific Ocean beds. Mid-latitude glaciation probably began before the end of the epoch. The global cooling that occurred during the Pliocene may have spurred on the disappearance of forests and the spread of grasslands and savannas.

The Pleistocene climate was characterized by repeated glacial cycles during which continental glaciers pushed to the 40th parallel in some places. Four major glacial events have been identified, as well as many minor intervening events. A major event is a general glacial excursion, termed a "glacial". Glacials are separated by "interglacials". During a glacial, the glacier experiences minor advances and retreats. The minor excursion is a "stadial"; times between stadials are "interstadials". Each glacial advance tied up huge volumes of water in continental ice sheets 1,500–3,000 m (4,900–9,800 ft) deep, resulting in temporary sea level drops of 100 m (330 ft) or more over the entire surface of the Earth. During interglacial times, drowned coastlines were common, mitigated by isostatic or other emergent motion of some regions.

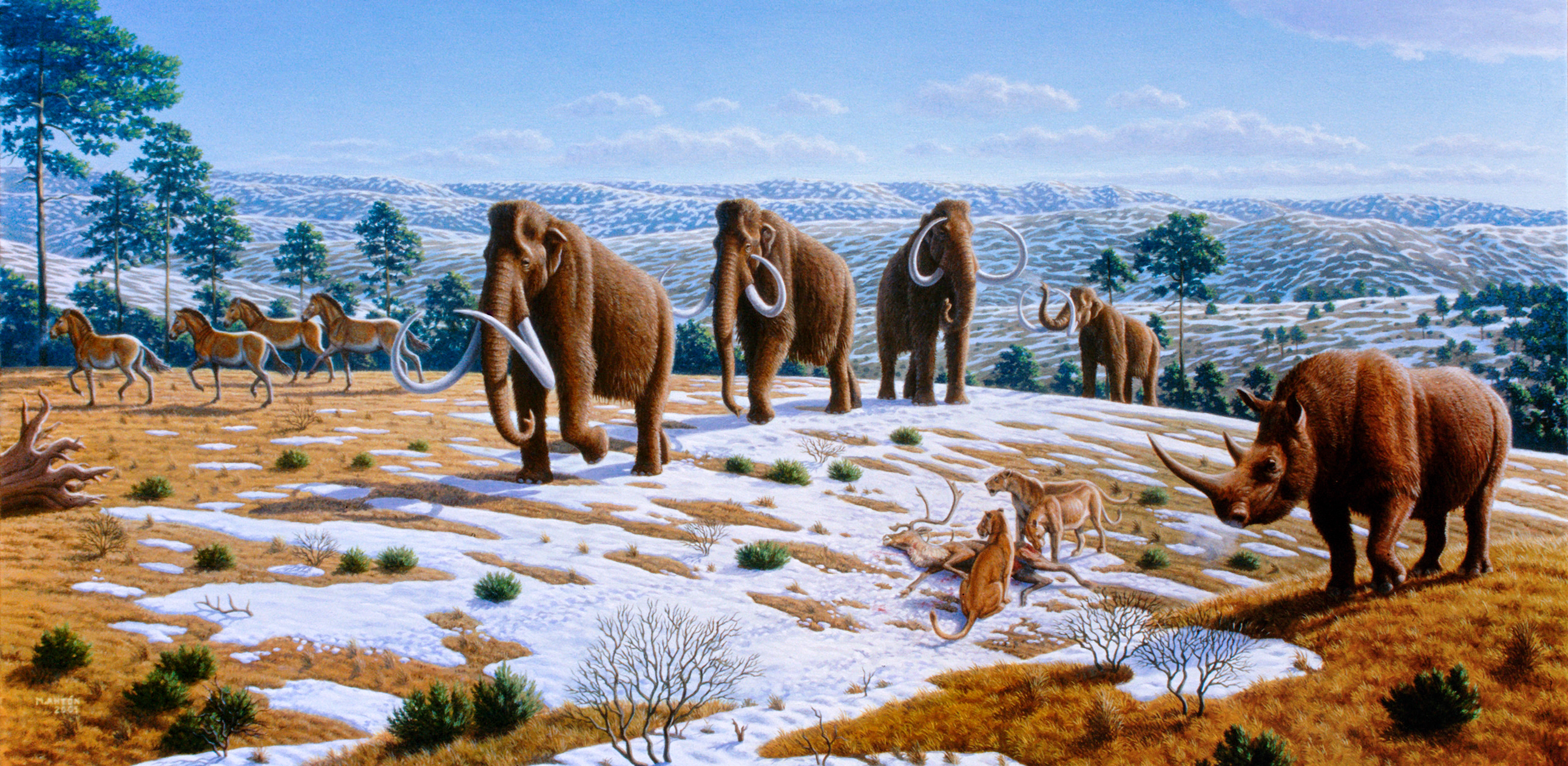
Many giant mammals such as woolly mammoths, woolly rhinoceroses, and cave lions inhabited the mammoth steppe during the Pleistocene.

The effects of glaciation were global. Antarctica was ice-bound throughout the Pleistocene and the preceding Pliocene. The Andes were covered in the south by the Patagonian ice cap. There were glaciers in New Zealand and Tasmania. The decaying glaciers of Mount Kenya, Mount Kilimanjaro, and the Ruwenzori Range in east and central Africa were larger. Glaciers existed in the mountains of Ethiopia and to the west in the Atlas Mountains. In the northern hemisphere, many glaciers fused into one. The Cordilleran Ice Sheet covered the North American northwest; the Laurentide covered the east. The Fenno-Scandian ice sheet covered northern Europe, including Great Britain; the Alpine ice sheet covered the Alps. Scattered domes stretched across Siberia and the Arctic shelf. The northern seas were frozen. During the late Upper Paleolithic (Latest Pleistocene) c. 18,000 BP, the Beringia land bridge between Asia and North America was blocked by ice, which may have prevented early Paleo-Indians such as the Clovis culture from directly crossing Beringia to reach the Americas.

According to Mark Lynas (through collected data), the Pleistocene's overall climate could be characterized as a continuous El Niño with trade winds in the south Pacific weakening or heading east, warm air rising near Peru, warm water spreading from the west Pacific and the Indian Ocean to the east Pacific, and other El Niño markers.

The Paleolithic is often held to finish at the end of the ice age (the end of the Pleistocene epoch), and Earth's climate became warmer. This may have caused or contributed to the extinction of the Pleistocene megafauna, although it is also possible that the late Pleistocene extinctions were (at least in part) caused by other factors such as disease and overhunting by humans. New research suggests that the extinction of the woolly mammoth may have been caused by the combined effect of climatic change and human hunting.

Scientists suggest that climate change during the end of the Pleistocene caused the mammoths' habitat to shrink, resulting in a drop in population. The small populations were then hunted out by Paleolithic humans. The global warming that occurred during the end of the Pleistocene and the beginning of the Holocene may have made it easier for humans to reach mammoth habitats that were previously frozen and inaccessible. Small populations of woolly mammoths survived on isolated Arctic islands, Saint Paul Island and Wrangel Island, until c. 3700 BP and c. 1700 BP respectively. The Wrangel Island population became extinct around the same time the island was settled by prehistoric humans. There is no evidence of prehistoric human presence on Saint Paul island (though early human settlements dating as far back as 6500 BP were found on the nearby Aleutian Islands).

Classifications of Paleolithic geoclimatic episodes
Age (before)	America	Atlantic Europe	Maghreb	Mediterranean Europe	Central Europe
10,000 years	Flandrian interglacial	Flandriense	Mellahiense	Versiliense	Flandrian interglacial
80,000 years	Wisconsin	Devensiense	Regresión	Regresión	Wisconsin Stage
140,000 years	Sangamoniense	Ipswichiense	Ouljiense	Tirreniense II y III	Eemian Stage
200,000 years	Illinois	Wolstoniense	Regresión	Regresión	Wolstonian Stage
450,000 years	Yarmouthiense	Hoxniense	Anfatiense	Tirreniense I	Hoxnian Stage
580,000 years	Kansas	Angliense	Regresión	Regresión	Kansan Stage
750,000 years	Aftoniense	Cromeriense	Maarifiense	Siciliense	Cromerian Complex
1,100,000 years	Nebraska	Beestoniense	Regresión	Regresión	Beestonian stage
1,400,000 years	interglacial	Ludhamiense	Messaudiense	Calabriense	Donau-Günz

== Paleolithic people ==
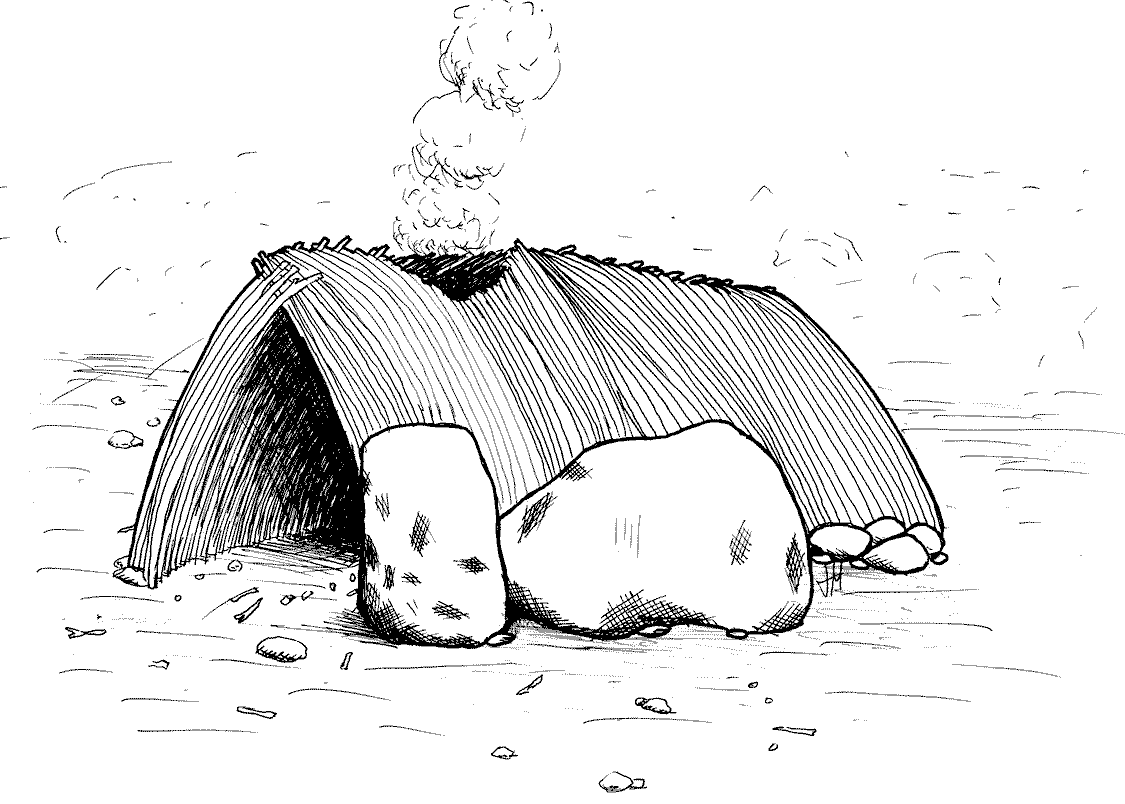
An artist's rendering of a temporary wood house, based on evidence found at Terra Amata (in Nice, France) and dated to the Lower Paleolithic (c. 400,000 BP)

Nearly all of our knowledge of Paleolithic people and way of life comes from archaeology and ethnographic comparisons to modern hunter-gatherer cultures such as the !Kung San who live similarly to their Paleolithic predecessors. The economy of a typical Paleolithic society was a hunter-gatherer economy. Humans hunted wild animals for meat and gathered food, firewood, and materials for their tools, clothes, or shelters.

The population density was very low, around only 0.4 inhabitants per square kilometre (1/sq mi). This was most likely due to low body fat, infanticide, high levels of physical activity among women, late weaning of infants, and a nomadic lifestyle. In addition, even a large area of land could not support many people without being actively farmed – food was difficult to come by and so groups were prevented from growing too large by the amount of food they could gather. Like contemporary hunter-gatherers, Paleolithic humans enjoyed an abundance of leisure time unparalleled in both Neolithic farming societies and modern industrial societies. At the end of the Paleolithic, specifically the Middle or Upper Paleolithic, people began to produce works of art such as cave paintings, rock art and jewellery and began to engage in religious behavior such as burials and rituals.

Evidence of mourning rituals has revealed Palaeolithic communities grieved like modern day humans. This includes accompanying those who were dying, attending their wounds until death, burial and decoration of the body and rituals to remember loved ones.

=== Homo erectus ===
At the beginning of the Paleolithic, hominins were found primarily in eastern Africa, east of the Great Rift Valley. Most known hominin fossils dating earlier than one million years before present are found in this area, particularly in Kenya, Tanzania, and Ethiopia.

By c. 2,000,000 – c. 1,500,000 BP, groups of hominins began leaving Africa, settling southern Europe and Asia. The South Caucasus was occupied by c. 1,700,000 BP, and northern China was reached by c. 1,660,000 BP. By the end of the Lower Paleolithic, members of the hominin family were living in what is now China, western Indonesia, and, in Europe, around the Mediterranean and as far north as England, France, southern Germany, and Bulgaria. Their further northward expansion may have been limited by the lack of control of fire: studies of cave settlements in Europe indicate no regular use of fire prior to c. 400,000 – c. 300,000 BP.

East Asian fossils from this period are typically placed in the genus Homo erectus. Very little fossil evidence is available at known Lower Paleolithic sites in Europe, but it is believed that hominins who inhabited these sites were likewise Homo erectus. There is no evidence of hominins in America, Australia, or almost anywhere in Oceania during this time period.

Fates of these early colonists, and their relationships to modern humans, are still subject to debate. According to current archaeological and genetic models, there were at least two notable expansion events subsequent to peopling of Eurasia c. 2,000,000 – c. 1,500,000 BP. Around 500,000 BP a group of early humans, frequently called Homo heidelbergensis, came to Europe from Africa and eventually evolved into Homo neanderthalensis (Neanderthals). In the Middle Paleolithic, Neanderthals were present in the region now occupied by Poland.

Both Homo erectus and Homo neanderthalensis became extinct by the start of the Upper Paleolithic. Descended from Homo sapiens, the anatomically modern Homo sapiens sapiens emerged in eastern Africa c. 300,000 BP, left Africa around 50,000 BP, and expanded throughout the planet. Multiple hominid groups coexisted for some time in certain locations. Homo neanderthalensis were still found in parts of Eurasia c. 40,000 BP years, and engaged in an unknown degree of interbreeding with Homo sapiens sapiens. DNA studies also suggest an unknown degree of interbreeding between Homo sapiens sapiens and Homo sapiens denisova.

Hominin fossils not belonging either to Homo neanderthalensis or to Homo sapiens species, found in the Altai Mountains and Indonesia, were radiocarbon dated to c. 30,000 – c. 40,000 BP and c. 17,000 BP respectively.

For the duration of the Paleolithic, human populations remained low, especially outside the equatorial region. The entire population of Europe between 16,000 and 11,000 BP likely averaged some 30,000 individuals, and between 40,000 and 16,000 BP, it was even lower at 4,000–6,000 individuals. However, remains of thousands of butchered animals and tools made by Palaeolithic humans were found in Lapa do Picareiro, a cave in Portugal, dating back between 41,000 and 38,000 years ago.

== Technology and crafts ==
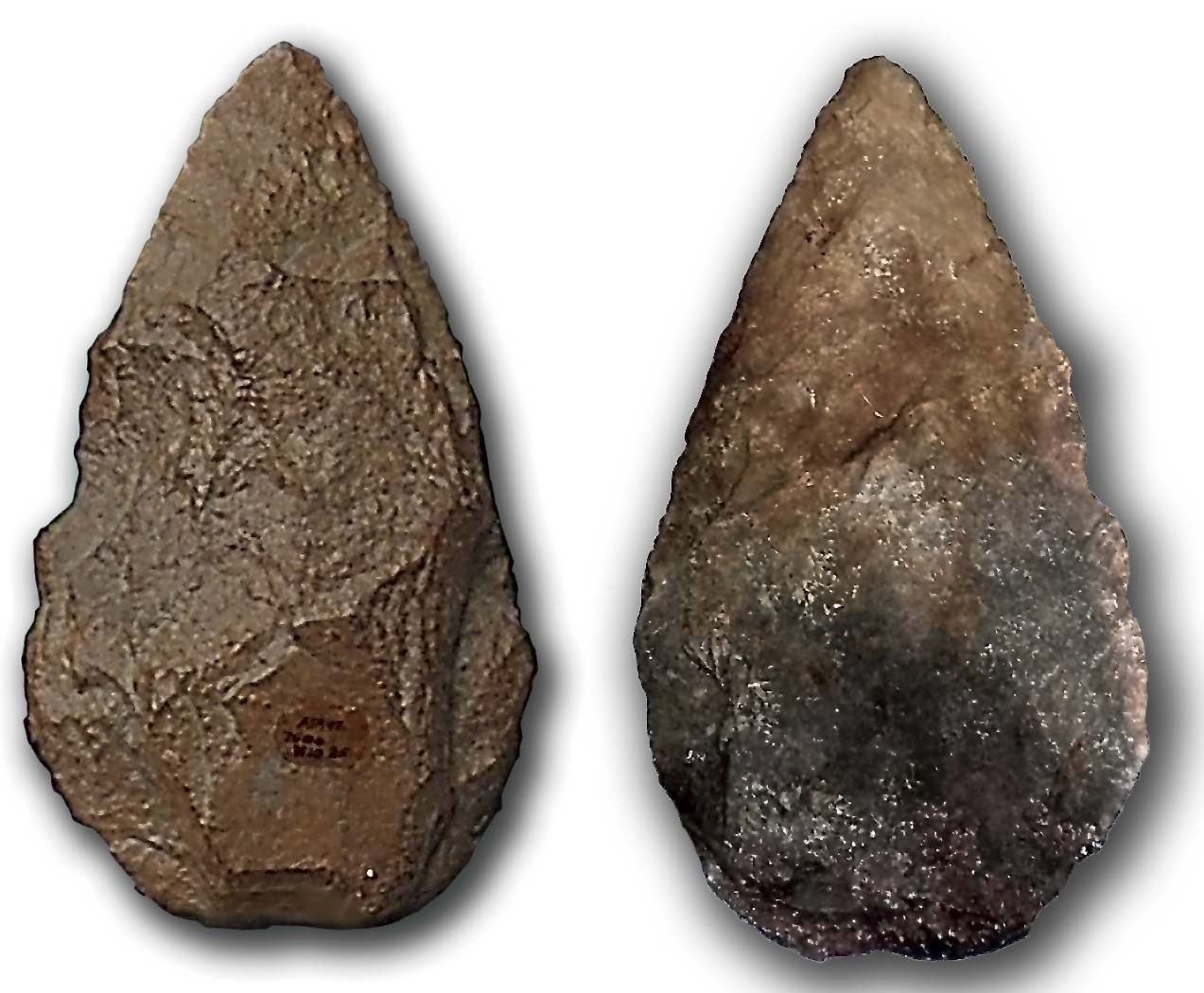
Lower Paleolithic biface viewed from both its superior and inferior surface

Making fire was widespread knowledge, and it was possible without an understanding of chemical processes. These types of practical skills are sometimes called crafts. Religion, superstitution or appeals to the supernatural may have played a part in the cultural explanations of phenomena like combustion.

=== Tools ===
Paleolithic humans made tools of stone, bone (primarily of deer), and wood. The early Paleolithic hominins, Australopithecus, were the first users of stone tools. Excavations in Gona, Ethiopia, have produced thousands of artifacts, and through radioisotopic dating and magnetostratigraphy the sites can be firmly dated to 2.6 million years ago. Evidence shows these early hominins intentionally selected raw stone with good flaking qualities and chose appropriately sized stones for their needs to produce sharp-edged tools for cutting.

The earliest Paleolithic stone tool industry, the Oldowan, began around 2.6 million years ago. It produced tools such as choppers, burins, and stitching awls. It was completely replaced around 250,000 years ago by the more complex Acheulean industry, which was first conceived by Homo ergaster around 1.8–1.65 million years ago. The Acheulean implements completely vanish from the archaeological record around 100,000 years ago and were replaced by more complex Middle Paleolithic tool kits such as the Mousterian and the Aterian industries.

Lower Paleolithic humans used a variety of stone tools, including hand axes and choppers. Although they appear to have used hand axes often, there is disagreement about their use. Interpretations range from cutting and chopping tools, to digging implements, to flaking cores, to the use in traps, and as a purely ritual significance, perhaps in courting behavior. William H. Calvin has suggested that some hand axes could have served as "killer frisbees" meant to be thrown at a herd of animals at a waterhole so as to stun one of them. There are no indications of hafting, and some artifacts are far too large for that. Thus, a thrown hand axe would not usually have penetrated deeply enough to cause very serious injuries. Nevertheless, it could have been an effective weapon for defense against predators. Choppers and scrapers were likely used for skinning and butchering scavenged animals and sharp-ended sticks were often obtained for digging up edible roots. Presumably, early humans used wooden spears as early as 5 million years ago to hunt small animals, much as their relatives, chimpanzees, have been observed to do in Senegal, Africa. Lower Paleolithic humans constructed shelters, such as the possible wood hut at Terra Amata.

=== Fire use ===
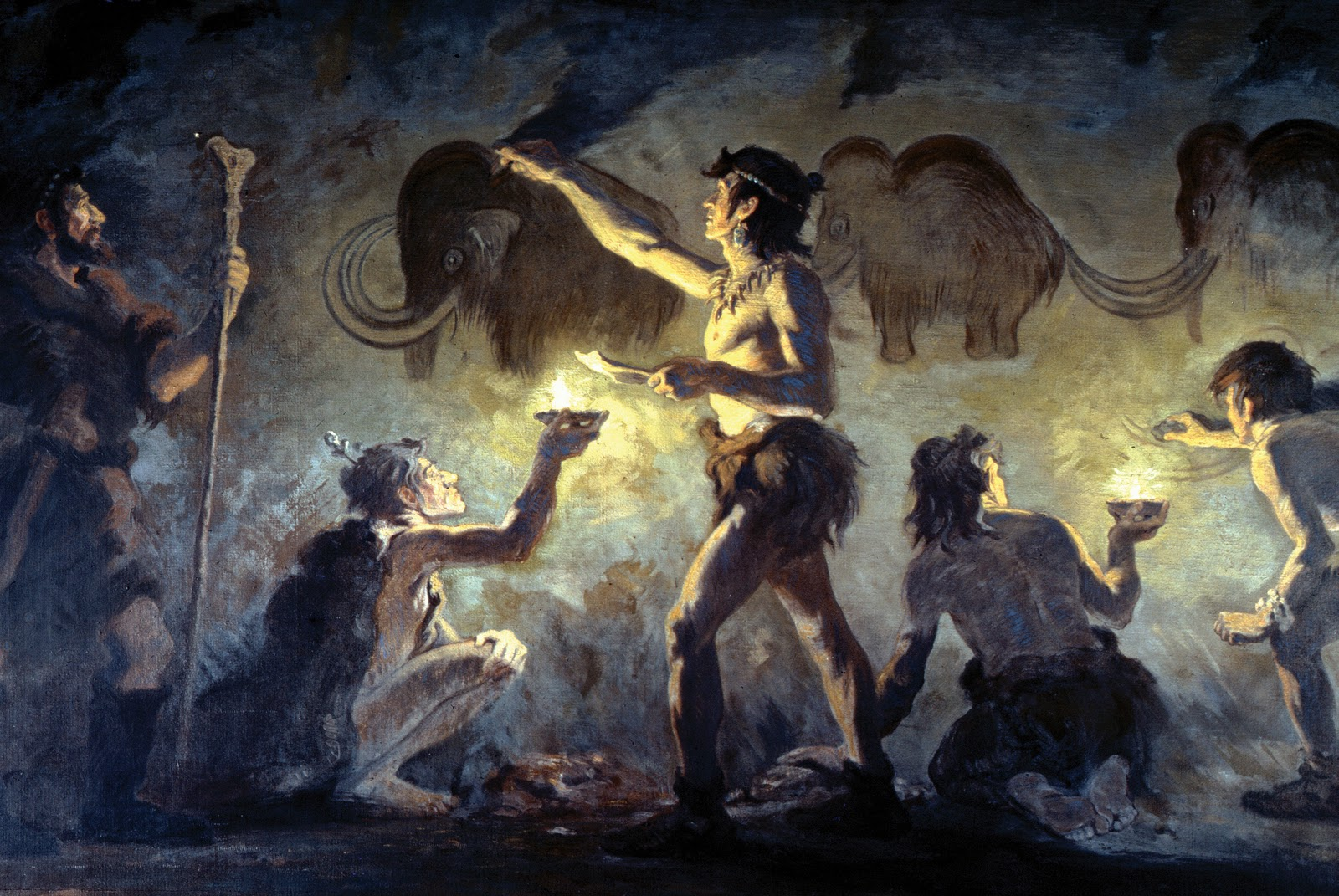
Charles R. Knight's 1920 reconstruction of Magdalenian painters at Font-de-Gaume, France

Fire was used by the Lower Paleolithic hominins Homo erectus and Homo ergaster as early as 300,000 to 1.5 million years ago and possibly even earlier by the early Lower Paleolithic (Oldowan) hominin Homo habilis or by robust Australopithecines such as Paranthropus. However, the use of fire only became common in the societies of the following Middle Stone Age and Middle Paleolithic. Use of fire reduced mortality rates and provided protection against predators. Early hominins may have begun to cook their food as early as the Lower Paleolithic (c. 1.9 million years ago) or at the latest in the early Middle Paleolithic (c. 250,000 years ago). Some scientists have hypothesized that hominins began cooking food to defrost frozen meat, which would help ensure their survival in cold regions.

Archaeologists cite morphological shifts in cranial anatomy as evidence for emergence of cooking and food processing technologies. These morphological changes include decreases in molar and jaw size, thinner tooth enamel, and decrease in gut volume. During much of the Pleistocene epoch, our ancestors relied on simple food processing techniques such as roasting. The Upper Palaeolithic saw the emergence of boiling, an advance in food processing technology which rendered plant foods more digestible, decreased their toxicity, and maximised their nutritional value.

Thermally altered rock (heated stones) are easily identifiable in the archaeological record. Stone-boiling and pit-baking were common techniques which involved heating large pebbles then transferring the hot stones into a perishable container to heat the water. This technology is typified in the Middle Palaeolithic example of the Abri Pataud hearths.

=== Rafts ===
The Lower Paleolithic Homo erectus possibly invented rafts (c. 840,000 – c. 800,000 BP) to travel over large bodies of water, which may have allowed a group of Homo erectus to reach the island of Flores and evolve into the small hominin Homo floresiensis. However, this hypothesis is disputed within the anthropological community. The possible use of rafts during the Lower Paleolithic may indicate that Lower Paleolithic hominins such as Homo erectus were more advanced than previously believed, and may have even spoken an early form of modern language. Supplementary evidence from Neanderthal and modern human sites located around the Mediterranean Sea, such as Coa de sa Multa (c. 300,000 BP), has also indicated that both Middle and Upper Paleolithic humans used rafts to travel over large bodies of water (i.e. the Mediterranean Sea) for the purpose of colonizing other bodies of land.

=== Advanced tools ===
By around 200,000 BP, Middle Paleolithic stone tool manufacturing spawned a tool-making technique known as the prepared-core technique, which was more elaborate than previous Acheulean techniques. This technique increased efficiency by allowing the creation of more controlled and consistent flakes. It allowed Middle Paleolithic humans to create stone-tipped spears, which were the earliest composite tools, by hafting sharp pointy stone flakes onto wooden shafts. In addition to improving tool-making methods, the Middle Paleolithic also saw an improvement of the tools themselves that allowed access to a wider variety and amount of food sources. For example, microliths or small stone tools or points were invented around 70,000–65,000 BP and were essential to the invention of bows and atlatls (spear throwers) in the following Upper Paleolithic.

Harpoons were invented and used for the first time during the late Middle Paleolithic (c. 90,000 BP); the invention of these devices brought fish into the human diets, which provided a hedge against starvation and a more abundant food supply. Thanks to their technology and their advanced social structures, Paleolithic groups such as the Neanderthals—who had a Middle Paleolithic level of technology—appear to have hunted large game just as well as Upper Paleolithic modern humans, and the Neanderthals in particular may have likewise hunted with projectile weapons. Nonetheless, Neanderthal use of projectile weapons in hunting occurred very rarely (or perhaps never) and the Neanderthals hunted large game animals mostly by ambushing them and attacking them with handheld weapons such as thrusting spears rather than attacking them from a distance with projectiles.

=== Other inventions ===
During the Upper Paleolithic, further inventions were made, such as the net (c. 22,000 or c. 29,000 BP) bolas, the spear thrower (c. 30,000 BP), the bow and arrow (c. 25,000 or c. 30,000 BP) and the oldest example of ceramic art, the Venus of Dolní Věstonice (c. 29,000 – c. 25,000 BP). Kilu Cave at Buku island, Solomon Islands, demonstrates navigation of some 60 km of open ocean at 30,000 BCcal.

Early dogs were domesticated sometime between 30,000 and 14,000 BP, presumably to aid in hunting. However, the earliest instances of successful domestication of dogs may be much more ancient than this. Evidence from canine DNA collected by Robert K. Wayne suggests that dogs may have been first domesticated in the late Middle Paleolithic around 100,000 BP or perhaps even earlier.

Archaeological evidence from the Dordogne region of France demonstrates that members of the European early Upper Paleolithic culture known as the Aurignacian used calendars (c. 30,000 BP). This was a lunar calendar that was used to document the phases of the moon. Genuine solar calendars did not appear until the Neolithic. Upper Paleolithic cultures were probably able to time the migration of game animals such as wild horses and deer. This ability allowed humans to become efficient hunters and to exploit a wide variety of game animals. Recent research indicates that the Neanderthals timed their hunts and the migrations of game animals long before the beginning of the Upper Paleolithic.

== Diet and nutrition ==
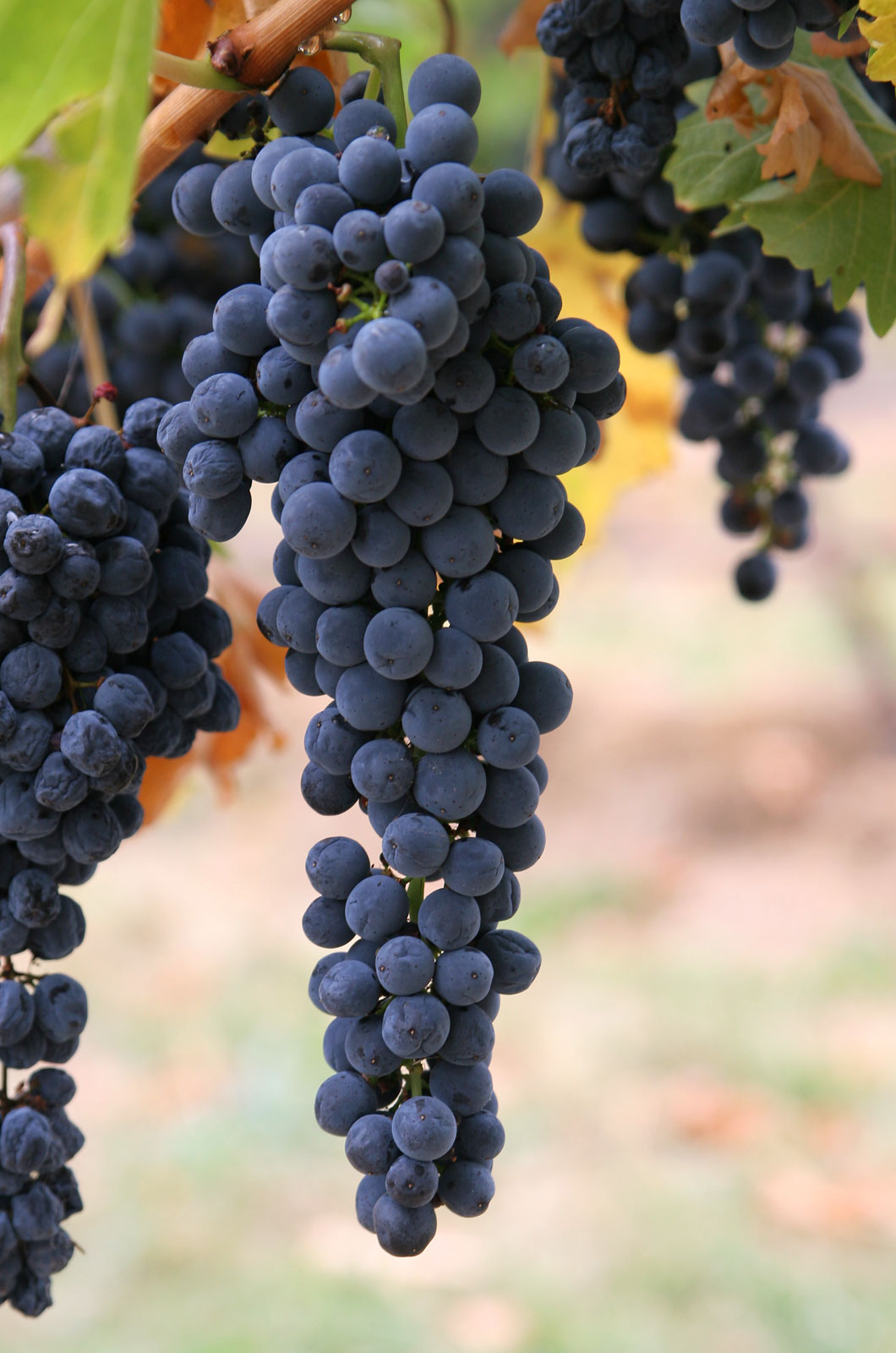
People may have first fermented grapes in animal skin pouches to create wine during the Paleolithic age.

Paleolithic hunting and gathering people ate varying proportions of vegetables (including tubers and roots), fruit, seeds (including nuts and wild grass seeds) and insects, meat, fish, and shellfish. However, there is little direct evidence of the relative proportions of plant and animal foods. Although the term "paleolithic diet", without references to a specific timeframe or locale, is sometimes used with an implication that most humans shared a certain diet during the entire era, that is not entirely accurate. The Paleolithic was an extended period of time, during which multiple technological advances were made, many of which had impact on human dietary structure. For example, humans probably did not possess the control of fire until the Middle Paleolithic, or tools necessary to engage in extensive fishing. On the other hand, both these technologies are generally agreed to have been widely available to humans by the end of the Paleolithic (consequently, allowing humans in some regions of the planet to rely heavily on fishing and hunting). In addition, the Paleolithic involved a substantial geographical expansion of human populations. During the Lower Paleolithic, ancestors of modern humans are thought to have been constrained to Africa east of the Great Rift Valley. During the Middle and Upper Paleolithic, humans greatly expanded their area of settlement, reaching ecosystems as diverse as New Guinea and Alaska, and adapting their diets to whatever local resources were available.

Another view is that until the Upper Paleolithic, humans were frugivores (fruit eaters) who supplemented their meals with carrion, eggs, and small prey such as baby birds and mussels, and only on rare occasions managed to kill and consume big game such as antelopes. This view is supported by studies of higher apes, particularly chimpanzees. Chimpanzees are the closest to humans genetically, sharing more than 96% of their DNA code with humans, and their digestive tract is functionally very similar to that of humans. Chimpanzees are primarily frugivores, but they could and would consume and digest animal flesh, given the opportunity. In general, their actual diet in the wild is about 95% plant-based, with the remaining 5% filled with insects, eggs, and baby animals. In some ecosystems, however, chimpanzees are predatory, forming parties to hunt monkeys. Some comparative studies of human and higher primate digestive tracts do suggest that humans have evolved to obtain greater amounts of calories from sources such as animal foods, allowing them to shrink the size of the gastrointestinal tract relative to body mass and to increase the brain mass instead.

Anthropologists have diverse opinions about the proportions of plant and animal foods consumed. Just as with still existing hunters and gatherers, there were many varied "diets" in different groups, and also varying through this vast amount of time. Some paleolithic hunter-gatherers consumed a significant amount of meat and possibly obtained most of their food from hunting, while others were believed to have a primarily plant-based diet. Most, if not all, are believed to have been opportunistic omnivores. One hypothesis is that carbohydrate tubers (plant underground storage organs) may have been eaten in high amounts by pre-agricultural humans. It is thought that the Paleolithic diet included as much as 1.65–1.9 kg (3.6–4.2 lb) per day of fruit and vegetables. The relative proportions of plant and animal foods in the diets of Paleolithic people often varied between regions, with more meat being necessary in colder regions (which were not populated by anatomically modern humans until c. 30,000 – c. 50,000 BP). It is generally agreed that many modern hunting and fishing tools, such as fish hooks, nets, bows, and poisons, were not introduced until the Upper Paleolithic and possibly even Neolithic. The only hunting tools widely available to humans during any significant part of the Paleolithic were hand-held spears and harpoons. There is evidence of Paleolithic people killing and eating seals and elands as far as c. 100,000 BP. On the other hand, buffalo bones found in African caves from the same period are typically of very young or very old individuals, and there is no evidence that pigs, elephants, or rhinos were hunted by humans at the time.

Paleolithic peoples suffered less famine and malnutrition than the Neolithic farming tribes that followed them. This was partly because Paleolithic hunter-gatherers accessed a wider variety of natural foods, which allowed them a more nutritious diet and a decreased risk of famine. Many of the famines experienced by Neolithic (and some modern) farmers were caused or amplified by their dependence on a small number of crops. It is thought that wild foods can have a significantly different nutritional profile than cultivated foods. The greater amount of meat obtained by hunting big game animals in Paleolithic diets than Neolithic diets may have also allowed Paleolithic hunter-gatherers to enjoy a more nutritious diet than Neolithic agriculturalists. It has been argued that the shift from hunting and gathering to agriculture resulted in an increasing focus on a limited variety of foods, with meat likely taking a back seat to plants. It is also unlikely that Paleolithic hunter-gatherers were affected by modern diseases of affluence such as type 2 diabetes, coronary heart disease, and cerebrovascular disease, because they ate mostly lean meats and plants and frequently engaged in intense physical activity, and because the average lifespan was shorter than the age of common onset of these conditions.

Large-seeded legumes were part of the human diet long before the Neolithic Revolution, as evident from archaeobotanical finds from the Mousterian layers of Kebara Cave, in Israel. There is evidence suggesting that Paleolithic societies were gathering wild cereals for food use at least as early as 30,000 years ago. However, seeds—such as grains and beans—were rarely eaten and never in large quantities on a daily basis. Recent archaeological evidence also indicates that winemaking may have originated in the Paleolithic, when early humans drank the juice of naturally fermented wild grapes from animal-skin pouches. Paleolithic humans consumed animal organ meats, including the livers, kidneys, and brains. Upper Paleolithic cultures appear to have had significant knowledge about plants and herbs and may have sometimes practiced rudimentary forms of horticulture. In particular, bananas and tubers may have been cultivated as early as 25,000 BP in southeast Asia. In the Paleolithic Levant, 23,000 years ago, cereals cultivation of emmer, barley, and oats has been observed near the Sea of Galilee.

Late Upper Paleolithic societies also appear to have occasionally practiced pastoralism and animal husbandry, presumably for dietary reasons. For instance, some European late Upper Paleolithic cultures domesticated and raised reindeer, presumably for their meat or milk, as early as 14,000 BP. Humans also probably consumed hallucinogenic plants during the Paleolithic. The Aboriginal Australians have been consuming a variety of native animal and plant foods, called bushfood, for an estimated 60,000 years, since the Middle Paleolithic.

In February 2019, scientists reported evidence, based on isotope studies, that at least some Neanderthals may have eaten meat. People during the Middle Paleolithic, such as the Neanderthals and Middle Paleolithic Homo sapiens in Africa, began to catch shellfish for food as revealed by shellfish cooking in Neanderthal sites in Italy about 110,000 years ago and in Middle Paleolithic Homo sapiens sites at Pinnacle Point, South Africa around 164,000 BP. Although fishing only became common during the Upper Paleolithic, fish have been part of human diets long before the dawn of the Upper Paleolithic and have certainly been consumed by humans since at least the Middle Paleolithic. For example, the Middle Paleolithic Homo sapiens in the region now occupied by the Democratic Republic of the Congo hunted large 6 ft (1.8 m)-long catfish with specialized barbed fishing points as early as 90,000 years ago. The invention of fishing allowed some Upper Paleolithic and later hunter-gatherer societies to become sedentary or semi-nomadic, which altered their social structures. Example societies are the Lepenski Vir as well as some contemporary hunter-gatherers, such as the Tlingit. In some instances (at least the Tlingit), they developed social stratification, slavery, and complex social structures such as chiefdoms.

Anthropologists such as Tim White suggest that cannibalism was common in human societies prior to the beginning of the Upper Paleolithic, based on the large amount of "butchered human" bones found in Neanderthal and other Lower/Middle Paleolithic sites. Cannibalism in the Lower and Middle Paleolithic may have occurred because of food shortages. However, it may have been for religious reasons, and would coincide with the development of religious practices thought to have occurred during the Upper Paleolithic. Nonetheless, it remains possible that Paleolithic societies never practiced cannibalism, and that the damage to recovered human bones was either the result of excarnation or predation by carnivores such as saber-toothed cats, lions, and hyenas.

A modern-day diet known as the Paleolithic diet exists, based on restricting consumption only to those foods presumed to be available to anatomically modern humans prior to the advent of settled agriculture.

== Social organization ==
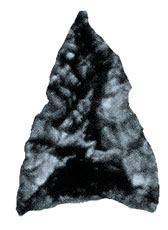
Humans may have taken part in long-distance trade between bands for rare commodities and raw materials (such as stone needed for making tools) as early as 120,000 years ago in Middle Paleolithic.

The social organization of the earliest Paleolithic (Lower Paleolithic) societies remains largely unknown to scientists, though Lower Paleolithic hominins such as Homo habilis and Homo erectus are likely to have had more complex social structures than chimpanzee societies. Late Oldowan/Early Acheulean humans such as Homo ergaster/Homo erectus may have been the first people to invent central campsites or home bases and incorporate them into their foraging and hunting strategies like contemporary hunter-gatherers, possibly as early as 1.7 million years ago; however, the earliest solid evidence for the existence of home bases or central campsites (hearths and shelters) among humans only dates back to 500,000 years ago.

Similarly, scientists disagree whether Lower Paleolithic humans were largely monogamous or polygynous. In particular, the Provisional model suggests that bipedalism arose in pre-Paleolithic australopithecine societies as an adaptation to monogamous lifestyles; however, other researchers note that sexual dimorphism is more pronounced in Lower Paleolithic humans such as Homo erectus than in modern humans, who are less polygynous than other primates, which suggests that Lower Paleolithic humans had a largely polygynous lifestyle, because species that have the most pronounced sexual dimorphism tend more likely to be polygynous.

Human societies from the Paleolithic to the early Neolithic farming tribes lived without states and organized governments. For most of the Lower Paleolithic, human societies were possibly more hierarchical than their Middle and Upper Paleolithic descendants, and probably were not grouped into bands, though during the end of the Lower Paleolithic, the latest populations of the hominin Homo erectus may have begun living in small-scale (possibly egalitarian) bands similar to both Middle and Upper Paleolithic societies and modern hunter-gatherers.

Middle Paleolithic societies, unlike Lower Paleolithic and early Neolithic ones, consisted of bands that ranged from 20 to 30 or 25–100 members and were usually nomadic. These bands were formed by several families. Bands sometimes joined into larger "macrobands" for activities such as acquiring mates and celebrations or where resources were abundant. By the end of the Paleolithic era (c. 10,000 BP), people began to settle down into permanent locations, and began to rely on agriculture for sustenance in many locations. Much evidence exists that humans took part in long-distance trade between bands for rare commodities (such as ochre, which was often used for religious purposes such as ritual) and raw materials, as early as 120,000 years ago in Middle Paleolithic. Inter-band trade may have appeared during the Middle Paleolithic because trade between bands would have helped ensure their survival by allowing them to exchange resources and commodities such as raw materials during times of relative scarcity (i.e. famine, drought). Like in modern hunter-gatherer societies, individuals in Paleolithic societies may have been subordinate to the band as a whole. Both Neanderthals and modern humans took care of the elderly members of their societies during the Middle and Upper Paleolithic.

Some sources claim that most Middle and Upper Paleolithic societies were possibly fundamentally egalitarian and may have rarely or never engaged in organized violence between groups (i.e. war).

Some Upper Paleolithic societies in resource-rich environments (such as societies in Sungir, in what is now Russia) may have had more complex and hierarchical organization (such as tribes with a pronounced hierarchy and a somewhat formal division of labor) and may have engaged in endemic warfare. Some argue that there was no formal leadership during the Middle and Upper Paleolithic. Like contemporary egalitarian hunter-gatherers such as the Mbuti pygmies, societies may have made decisions by communal consensus decision making rather than by appointing permanent rulers such as chiefs and monarchs. Nor was there a formal division of labor during the Paleolithic. Each member of the group was skilled at all tasks essential to survival, regardless of individual abilities. Theories to explain the apparent egalitarianism have arisen, notably the Marxist concept of primitive communism. Christopher Boehm (1999) has hypothesized that egalitarianism may have evolved in Paleolithic societies because of a need to distribute resources such as food and meat equally to avoid famine and ensure a stable food supply. Raymond C. Kelly speculates that the relative peacefulness of Middle and Upper Paleolithic societies resulted from a low population density, cooperative relationships between groups such as reciprocal exchange of commodities and collaboration on hunting expeditions, and because the invention of projectile weapons such as throwing spears provided less incentive for war, because they increased the damage done to the attacker and decreased the relative amount of territory attackers could gain. However, other sources claim that most Paleolithic groups may have been larger, more complex, sedentary and warlike than most contemporary hunter-gatherer societies, due to occupying more resource-abundant areas than most modern hunter-gatherers who have been pushed into more marginal habitats by agricultural societies.

Anthropologists have typically assumed that in Paleolithic societies, women were responsible for gathering wild plants and firewood, and men were responsible for hunting and scavenging dead animals. However, analogies to existent hunter-gatherer societies such as the Hadza people and the Aboriginal Australians suggest that the sexual division of labor in the Paleolithic was relatively flexible. Men may have participated in gathering plants, firewood and insects, and women may have procured small game animals for consumption and assisted men in driving herds of large game animals (such as woolly mammoths and deer) off cliffs. Additionally, recent research by anthropologist and archaeologist Steven Kuhn from the University of Arizona is argued to support that this division of labor did not exist prior to the Upper Paleolithic and was invented relatively recently in human pre-history. Sexual division of labor may have been developed to allow humans to acquire food and other resources more efficiently. Possibly there was approximate parity between men and women during the Middle and Upper Paleolithic, and that period may have been the most gender-equal time in human history. Archaeological evidence from art and funerary rituals indicates that a number of individual women enjoyed seemingly high status in their communities, and it is likely that both sexes participated in decision making. The earliest known Paleolithic shaman (c. 30,000 BP) was female. Jared Diamond suggests that the status of women declined with the adoption of agriculture because women in farming societies typically have more pregnancies and are expected to do more demanding work than women in hunter-gatherer societies. Like most modern hunter-gatherer societies, Paleolithic and Mesolithic groups probably followed a largely ambilineal approach. At the same time, depending on the society, the residence could be virilocal, uxorilocal, and sometimes the spouses could live with neither the husband's relatives nor the wife's relatives at all. Taken together, most likely, the lifestyle of hunter-gatherers can be characterized as multilocal.

== Sculpture and painting ==
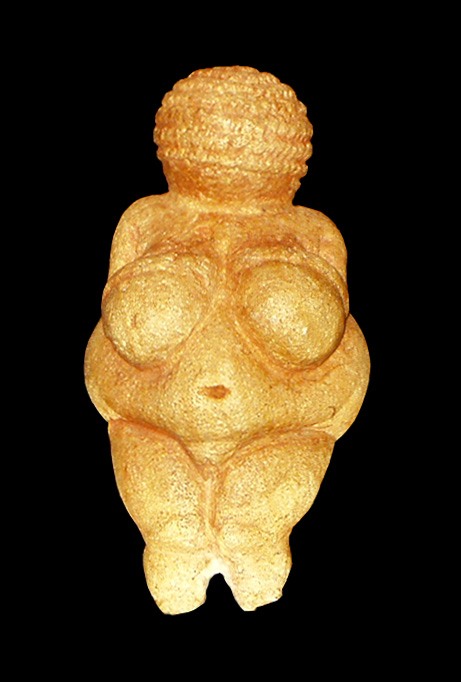
The Venus of Willendorf is one of the most famous Venus figurines.

Early examples of artistic expression, such as the Venus of Tan-Tan and the patterns found on elephant bones from Bilzingsleben in Thuringia, may have been produced by Acheulean tool users such as Homo erectus prior to the start of the Middle Paleolithic period. However, the earliest undisputed evidence of art during the Paleolithic comes from Middle Paleolithic/Middle Stone Age sites such as Blombos Cave–South Africa–in the form of bracelets, beads, rock art, and ochre used as body paint and perhaps in ritual. Undisputed evidence of art only becomes common in the Upper Paleolithic.

Lower Paleolithic Acheulean tool users, according to Robert G. Bednarik, began to engage in symbolic behavior such as art around 850,000 BP. They decorated themselves with beads and collected exotic stones for aesthetic, rather than utilitarian qualities. According to him, traces of the pigment ochre from late Lower Paleolithic Acheulean archaeological sites suggests that Acheulean societies, like later Upper Paleolithic societies, collected and used ochre to create rock art. Nevertheless, it is also possible that the ochre traces found at Lower Paleolithic sites is naturally occurring.

Upper Paleolithic humans produced works of art such as cave paintings, Venus figurines, animal carvings, and rock paintings. Upper Paleolithic art can be divided into two broad categories: figurative art such as cave paintings that clearly depicts animals (or more rarely humans); and nonfigurative, which consists of shapes and symbols. Cave paintings have been interpreted in a number of ways by modern archaeologists. The earliest explanation, by the prehistorian Abbe Breuil, interpreted the paintings as a form of magic designed to ensure a successful hunt. However, this hypothesis fails to explain the existence of animals such as saber-toothed cats and lions, which were not hunted for food, and the existence of half-human, half-animal beings in cave paintings. The anthropologist David Lewis-Williams has suggested that Paleolithic cave paintings were indications of shamanistic practices, because the paintings of half-human, half-animal figures and the remoteness of the caves are reminiscent of modern hunter-gatherer shamanistic practices. Symbol-like images are more common in Paleolithic cave paintings than are depictions of animals or humans, and unique symbolic patterns might have been trademarks that represent different Upper Paleolithic ethnic groups. Venus figurines have evoked similar controversy. Archaeologists and anthropologists have described the figurines as representations of goddesses, pornographic imagery, apotropaic amulets used for sympathetic magic, and even as self-portraits of women themselves.

R. Dale Guthrie has studied not only the most artistic and publicized paintings, but also a variety of lower-quality art and figurines, and he identifies a wide range of skill and ages among the artists. He also points out that the main themes in the paintings and other artifacts (powerful beasts, risky hunting scenes and the over-sexual representation of women) are to be expected in the fantasies of adolescent males during the Upper Paleolithic.

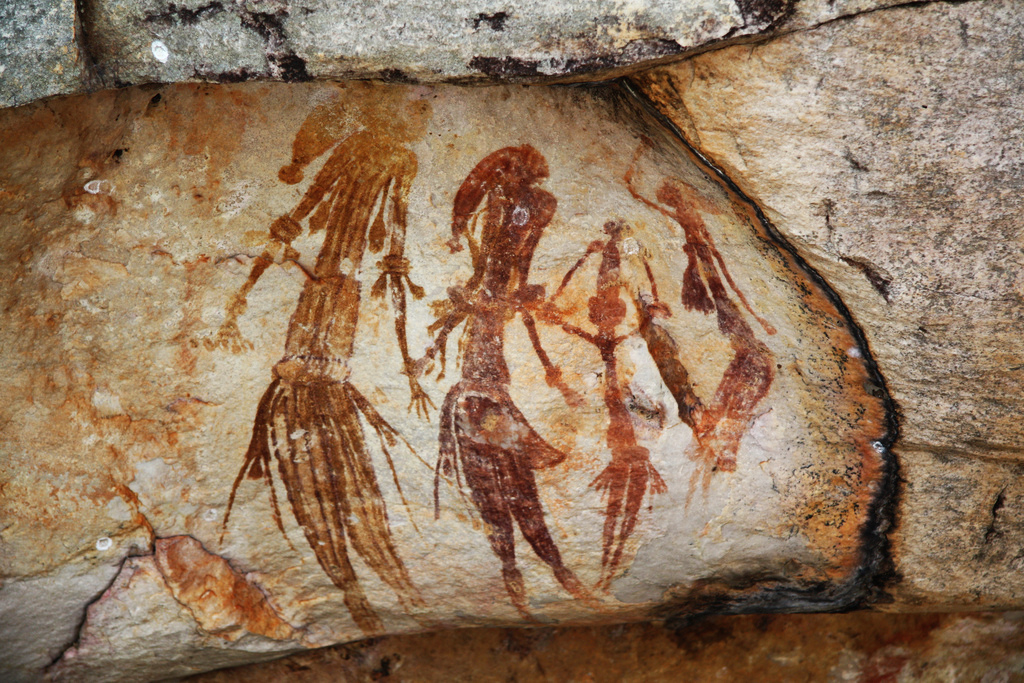
Gwion Gwion rock paintings found in the north-west Kimberley region of Western Australia.

The "Venus" figurines have been theorized, not universally, as representing a mother goddess; the abundance of such female imagery has inspired the theory that religion and society in Paleolithic (and later Neolithic) cultures were primarily interested in, and may have been directed by, women. Adherents of the theory include archaeologist Marija Gimbutas and feminist scholar Merlin Stone, the author of the 1976 book When God Was a Woman. Other explanations for the purpose of the figurines have been proposed, such as Catherine McCoid and LeRoy McDermott's hypothesis that they were self-portraits of woman artists and R.Dale Gutrie's hypothesis that served as "Stone Age pornography".

== Music ==
The origins of music during the Paleolithic are unknown. The earliest forms of music probably did not use musical instruments other than the human voice or natural objects such as rocks. This early music would not have left an archaeological footprint. Music may have developed from rhythmic sounds produced by daily chores, for example, cracking open nuts with stones. Maintaining a rhythm while working may have helped people to become more efficient at daily activities. An alternative theory originally proposed by Charles Darwin explains that music may have begun as a hominin mating strategy. Bird and other animal species produce music such as calls to attract mates. This hypothesis is generally less accepted than the previous hypothesis, but nonetheless provides a possible alternative.

Upper Paleolithic (and possibly Middle Paleolithic) humans used flute-like bone pipes as musical instruments, and music may have played a large role in the religious lives of Upper Paleolithic hunter-gatherers. As with modern hunter-gatherer societies, music may have been used in ritual or to help induce trances. In particular, it appears that animal skin drums may have been used in religious events by Upper Paleolithic shamans, as shown by the remains of drum-like instruments from some Upper Paleolithic graves of shamans and the ethnographic record of contemporary hunter-gatherer shamanic and ritual practices.

== Religion and beliefs ==
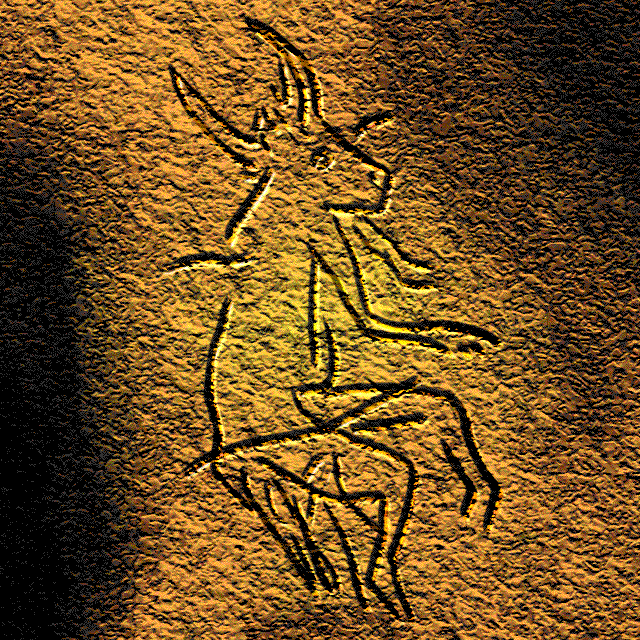
Picture of a half-human, half-animal being in a Paleolithic cave painting in Dordogne. France. Some archaeologists believe that cave paintings of half-human, half-animal beings may be evidence for early shamanic practices during the Paleolithic.

According to James B. Harrod mankind first developed religious and spiritual beliefs during the Middle Paleolithic or Upper Paleolithic. Controversial scholars of prehistoric religion and anthropology, James Harrod and Vincent W. Fallio, have recently proposed that religion and spirituality (and art) may have first arisen in Pre-Paleolithic chimpanzees or Early Lower Paleolithic (Oldowan) societies. According to Fallio, the common ancestor of chimpanzees and humans experienced altered states of consciousness and partook in ritual, and ritual was used in their societies to strengthen social bonding and group cohesion.

Middle Paleolithic humans' use of burials at sites such as Krapina, Croatia (c. 130,000 BP) and Qafzeh, Israel (c. 100,000 BP) have led some anthropologists and archaeologists, such as Philip Lieberman, to believe that Middle Paleolithic humans may have possessed a belief in an afterlife and a "concern for the dead that transcends daily life". Cut marks on Neanderthal bones from various sites, such as Combe-Grenal and Abri Moula in France, suggest that the Neanderthals—like some contemporary human cultures—may have practiced ritual defleshing for (presumably) religious reasons. According to recent archaeological findings from Homo heidelbergensis sites in Atapuerca, humans may have begun burying their dead much earlier, during the late Lower Paleolithic; but this theory is widely questioned in the scientific community.

Likewise, some scientists have proposed that Middle Paleolithic societies such as Neanderthal societies may also have practiced the earliest form of totemism or animal worship, in addition to their (presumably religious) burial of the dead. In particular, Emil Bächler suggested (based on archaeological evidence from Middle Paleolithic caves) that a bear cult was widespread among Middle Paleolithic Neanderthals. A claim that evidence was found for Middle Paleolithic animal worship c. 70,000 BCE originates from the Tsodilo Hills in the African Kalahari desert has been denied by the original investigators of the site. Animal cults in the Upper Paleolithic, such as the bear cult, may have had their origins in these hypothetical Middle Paleolithic animal cults. Animal worship during the Upper Paleolithic was intertwined with hunting rites. For instance, archaeological evidence from art and bear remains reveals that the bear cult apparently involved a type of sacrificial bear ceremonialism, in which a bear was shot with arrows, finished off by a shot or thrust in the lungs, and ritually worshipped near a clay bear statue covered by a bear fur with the skull and the body of the bear buried separately. Barbara Ehrenreich controversially theorizes that the sacrificial hunting rites of the Upper Paleolithic (and by extension Paleolithic cooperative big-game hunting) gave rise to war or warlike raiding during the following Epipaleolithic and Mesolithic or late Upper Paleolithic.

The existence of anthropomorphic images and half-human, half-animal images in the Upper Paleolithic may further indicate that Upper Paleolithic humans were the first people to believe in a pantheon of gods or supernatural beings, though such images may instead indicate shamanistic practices similar to those of contemporary tribal societies. The earliest known undisputed burial of a shaman (and by extension the earliest undisputed evidence of shamans and shamanic practices) dates back to the early Upper Paleolithic era (c. 30,000 BP) in what is now the Czech Republic. However, during the early Upper Paleolithic it was probably more common for all members of the band to participate equally and fully in religious ceremonies, in contrast to the religious traditions of later periods when religious authorities and part-time ritual specialists such as shamans, priests and medicine men were relatively common and integral to religious life.

Religion was possibly apotropaic; specifically, it may have involved sympathetic magic. The Venus figurines, which are abundant in the Upper Paleolithic archaeological record, provide an example of possible Paleolithic sympathetic magic, as they may have been used for ensuring success in hunting and to bring about fertility of the land and women. The Upper Paleolithic Venus figurines have sometimes been explained as depictions of an earth goddess similar to Gaia, or as representations of a goddess who is the ruler or mother of the animals. James Harrod has described them as representative of female (and male) shamanistic spiritual transformation processes.

== See also ==
- Abbassia Pluvial
- Bontnewydd Palaeolithic site
- Caveman
- Japanese Paleolithic
- Lascaux
- Last Glacial Maximum
- Luzia Woman
- Mousterian Pluvial
- Origins of society
- Palaeoarchaeology
- Peopling of the Americas
- Turkana Boy
