= Lapa do Picareiro =

Archaeological site in Portugal

Coordinates: 39.5317°N 8.6542°W

- Type: Natural cave
- Location: Alcanena, Portugal

The Lapa do Picareiro is a natural cave and prehistoric archaeological site located on the northern slopes of the Serra de Aire mountains in the Ribatejo region of Portugal. It contains the oldest human artifacts ever recovered in the western Iberian peninsula, which provide evidence of human occupation of the area dating back at least 38,000 years BP.

== Description ==
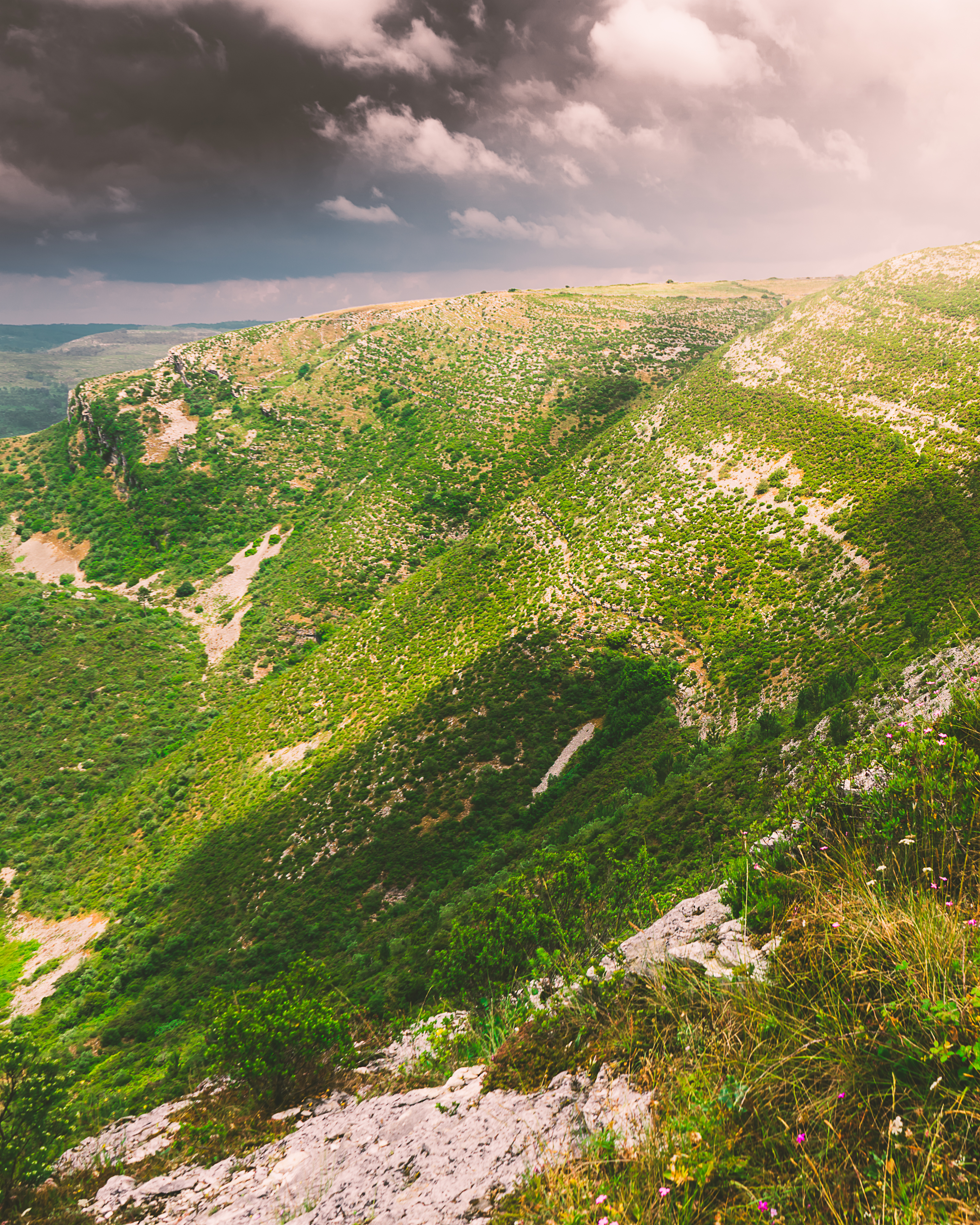
The mountain chain Serra de Aire, where the Lapa do Picareiro cave is situated.

The depth of the archeological, geological, and paleoecological deposits in Lapa do Picareiro exceeds 10 meters. Artifacts include pieces made from ceramic and stone (mainly flint, quartzite, and quartz), as well as various ornaments and remains of fauna like rabbit, red deer, ibex, chamois, aurochs, rodents, birds, and marine mollusks.

The earliest evidence human occupation of the Lapa do Picareiro dates back to the early Aurignacian period between 38,000 and 41,000 years BP—some 5,000 years earlier than humans were previously believed to have inhabited the western Iberian peninsula. Although it is not known whether anatomically modern humans and Neanderthals interacted in Iberia, evidence from Lapa do Picareiro suggests that their presence there may have overlapped for around 1,000 years.

Artifacts found within the Lapa do Picareiro also indicate human occupation during the Upper Paleolithic, Mesolithic, and Iron Age, including materials from the proto-Solutrean and Magdalenian cultures.
