= Sally McBrearty =

American paleoanthropologist

- Born: 1949
- Died: July, 2023
- Education: University of California, Berkeley; University of Illinois Urbana-Champaign
- Known for: Gradualist model of human behavioral modernity; Discovery of the first known chimpanzee fossil
- Spouse: Andrew Hill
- Scientific career
- Fields: Paleoanthropology; Paleolithic archaeology
- Institutions: Brandeis University; Yale University; College of William & Mary; University of Connecticut (1994–)
- Website: web.archive.org/web/20020415143341/http://www.anth.uconn.edu/faculty/mcbrearty/

Sally McBrearty (1949 – July 2023) was an American paleoanthropologist and Paleolithic archaeologist. She was a professor and head of the anthropology department at the University of Connecticut.

== Education and career ==
McBrearty studied at the University of California, Berkeley and the University of Illinois Urbana-Champaign, completing her PhD at Illinois in 1986. She joined the University of Connecticut in 1994, was appointed a professor in 2002, and head of the department of anthropology in 2008. Previously, she held positions at Brandeis University, Yale University, and the College of William & Mary.

She was elected a fellow of the American Association for the Advancement of Science in 2007.

== Research ==
=== Middle Stone Age in Africa ===
McBrearty's work on the Middle Stone Age (MSA) in Africa helped kickstart a paradigm shift in the understanding of modern human behavior. With colleague Alison S. Brooks, McBrearty published "The revolution that wasn't: a new interpretation of the origin of modern human behavior," one of the most-cited papers in the history of Paleolithic archaeology. This paper argued that behavioral modernity arose in Africa over a long period of time, and that it is visible very early in the MSA archaeological record. This view challenged European-centric models for human evolution that argued for a sudden appearance of behavioral modernity in Europe during the Upper Paleolithic.

=== Chimpanzee evolution ===
McBrearty and her colleague Nina Jablonski are credited with the discovery of the first known chimpanzee fossils. McBrearty collected the first fossil, a molar tooth, during her surveys at Kapthurin in the East African Rift Valley in 2004, and immediately suspected that it belonged to an ape. Joblonski, a specialist in monkey fossils, then examined the tooth and positively identified it as chimpanzee. She also found a second example, an incisor, in the same collection. The following year McBrearty's team returned to Kapthurin and discovered a further two fossil chimpanzee teeth. They believe that all four teeth belonged to the same individual.

McBrearty and Jablonski announced the discovery in a paper in Nature in 2005. As well as being the first known chimpanzee fossils, the teeth were the first fossils of modern, non-human apes found in Africa. Dating to around 500,000 years ago, they were also discovered outside the range of modern chimpanzees, overturning a previous idea that the Rift Valley was a barrier to the species. McBrearty has proposed that fossils of chimpanzees are scarce because their preferred habitat—the wet jungles of Central and West Africa—experience poor conditions for preservation. Researchers did not expect to find the ancestors of chimpanzees in the drier savannahs of the Rift Valley, typically seen as the ecological niche of archaic humans, but McBrearty believes that there are more examples there because of the better preservation.

== Personal life ==
McBrearty lived in Glastonbury, Connecticut. She was married to Andrew Hill, also a paleoanthropologist, until his death in 2015.
