= Huthwaite =

Village in Nottinghamshire, England

Coordinates: 53.125°N 1.301°W

- Village
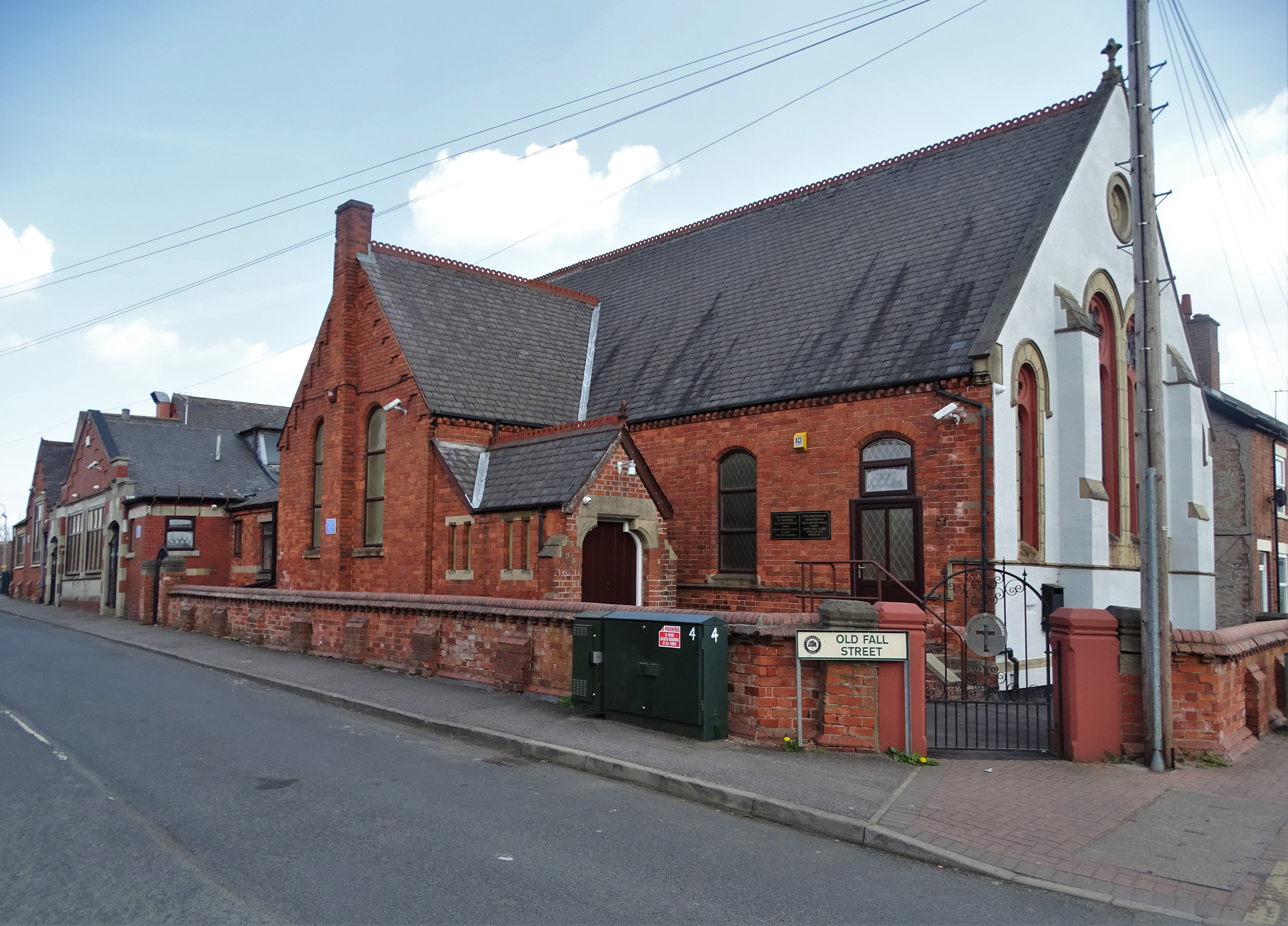
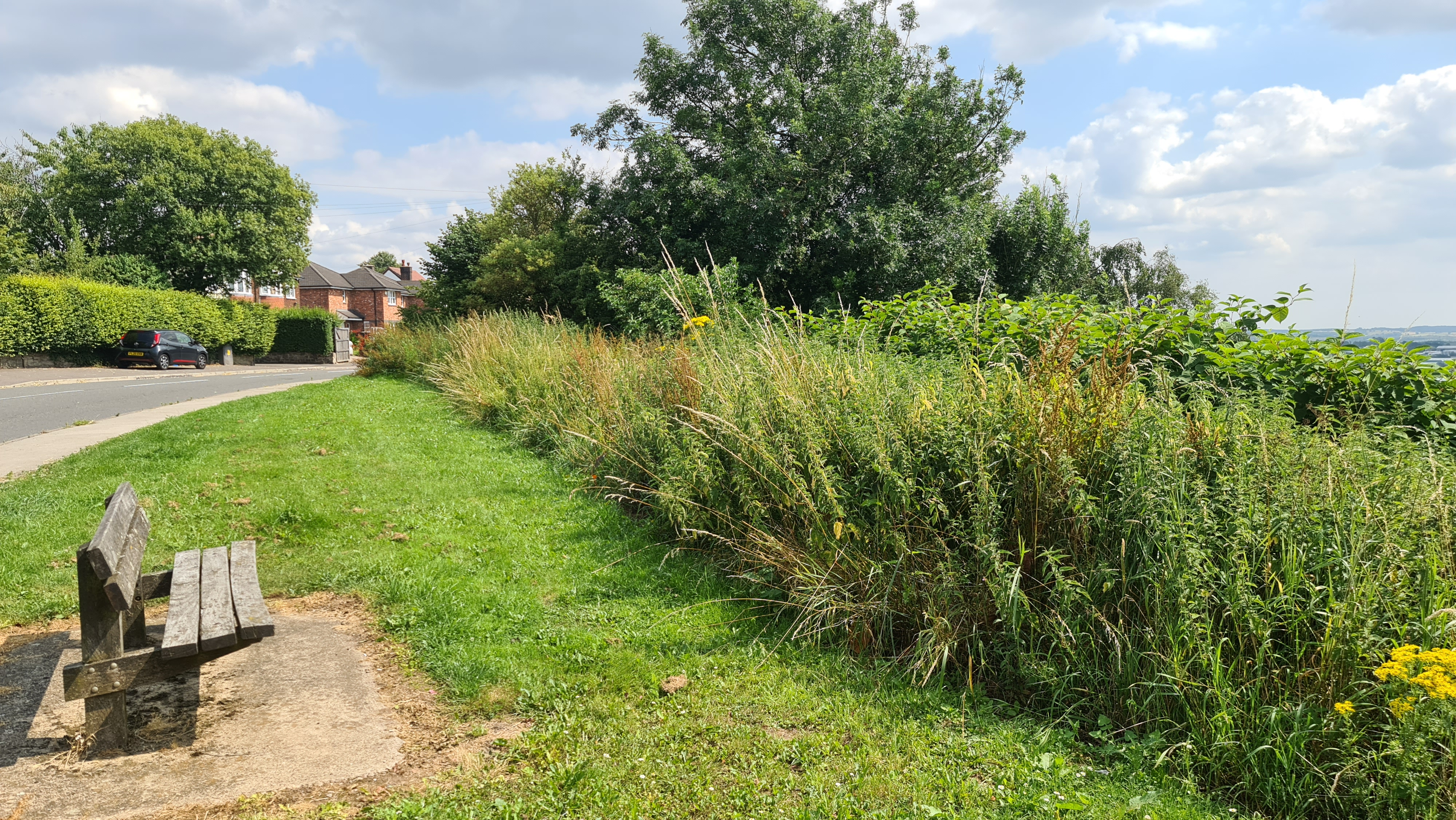
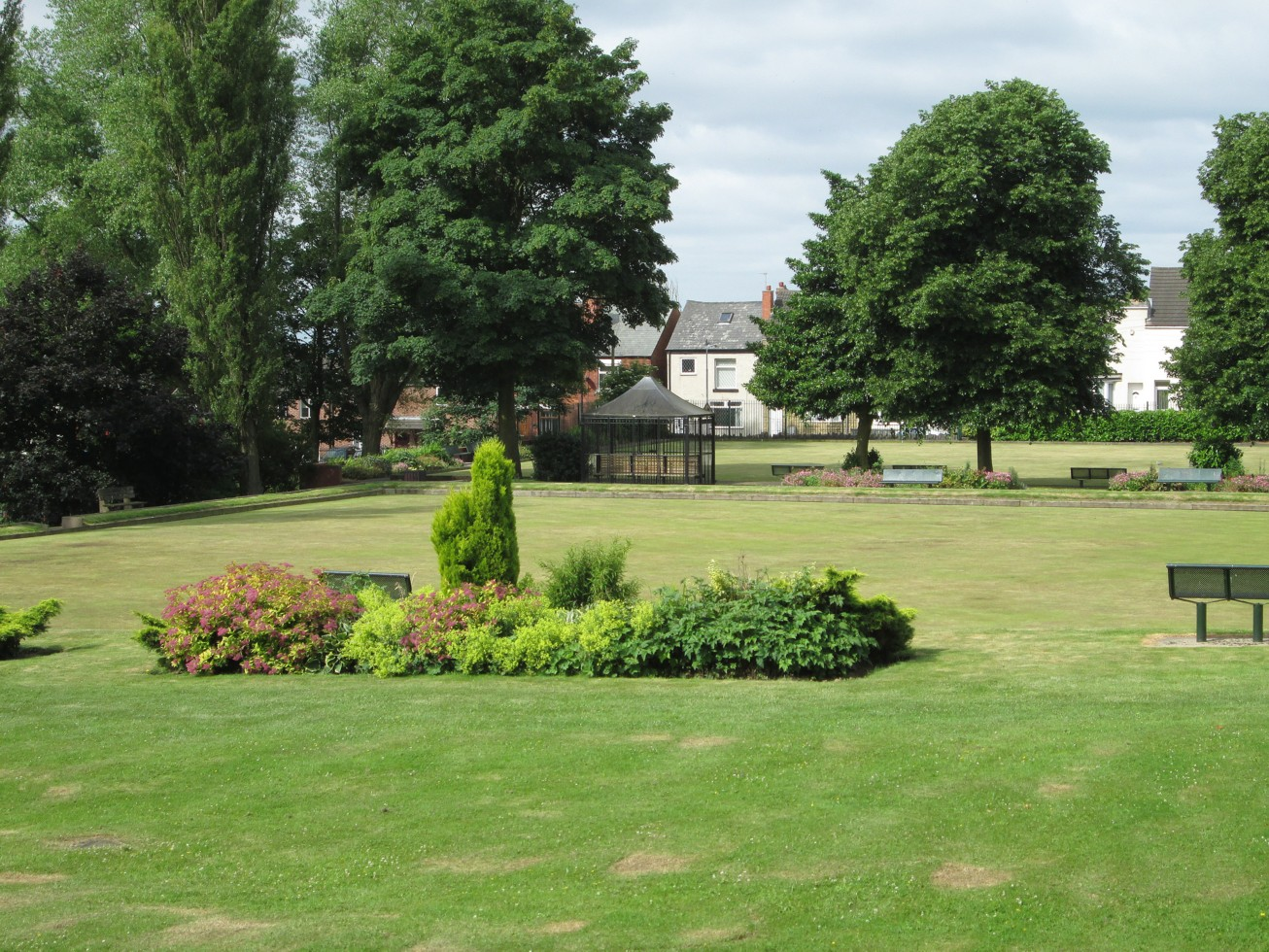
- St Cyril and St Methodius Church Strawberry Bank Welfare Park

- Location within Nottinghamshire
- Population: 7,500
- OS grid reference: SK468588
- District: Ashfield
- Shire county: Nottinghamshire
- Region: East Midlands
- Country: England
- Sovereign state: United Kingdom
- Post town: SUTTON-IN-ASHFIELD
- Postcode district: NG17
- Dialling code: 01623
- Police: Nottinghamshire
- Fire: Nottinghamshire
- Ambulance: East Midlands
- UK Parliament: Ashfield

Huthwaite is a village in the Ashfield district, in Nottinghamshire, England, located to the west of Mansfield, close to the Derbyshire boundary. It is in the Huthwaite and Brierley ward of Ashfield District Council. Before 1907 the village was known as Hucknall-under-Huthwaite and also Dirty Hucknall.

== Toponymy ==
The name Huthwaite is derived from Old English plus Norse elements—hoh is from haugr an Old Norse word for a hill and thwaite means a clearing—so, literally, a clearing on a hill spur. The former Hucknall element refers to Hucca's heath or angle of land and is shared with the present day Hucknall near Nottingham and Ault Hucknall in Derbyshire.

== History ==
=== Railways ===
The village was served by Whiteborough railway station on the former Teversal Branch Line. The nearest railway stations now are; Alfreton, Sutton Parkway, Mansfield, and Kirkby-in-Ashfield.

=== Former Industry and employment ===
The population in 1800 was about 500 but soon started to grow with the opening of Hucknall Colliery, a drift mine at the bottom of Blackwell Road. The "Miners Arms" public house is believed to have been the manager's cottage. This mine was worked for around 50 years. It closed due to flooding. In 1877 a new mine called New Hucknall Colliery was opened which employed 500 people. By 1881 the population of the village had grown to over 2000. By 1912 the workforce had increased to over 1,300 but the main industry in the village had become the manufacture of hosiery products.

The closure of the majority of mines in the area, which included New Hucknall Colliery in the early 1980s, and the off shoring of hosiery jobs led to large amounts of unemployment. However today this has been largely rectified.

=== Former CWS Hosiery factory ===
North Street shop Factory entrance

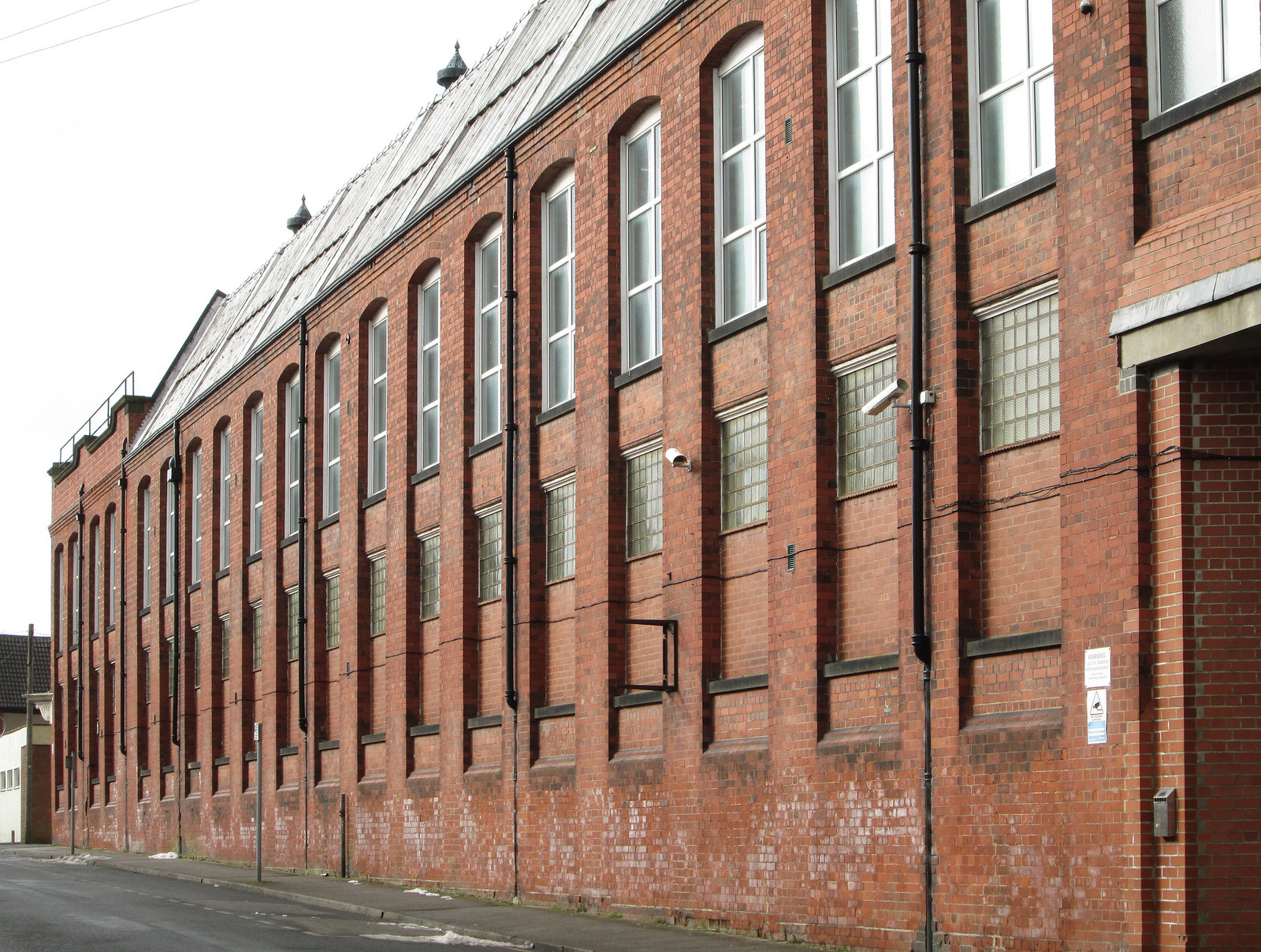
CWS Hosiery Factory

This large factory occupied most of a rectangular site extending along North Street and High Street in Huthwaite. It was demolished with an outline planning consent for housing.

When first built in 1907, it only extended along North Street, but was expanded in 1919 further down North Street. Various buildings had been added later, the most recent being the block along the north side of the site. In 1940, the British Royal Navy took over this 4-storey block to be the headquarters of their medical supply department for most of World War II. The architect of the 1907 building was Mr. F.E. Harris of Manchester and the contractor Mr. J. Dickinson of Derby.

The factory was built by the Cooperative Wholesale Society (CWS) for the manufacture of hosiery. It was sometimes referred to as the Belmont Clothing Factory, but "Belmont" may have been a clothing brand name, rather than the name of the building.

When first opened, it was expected to employ 400 people, but probably employed even more in its heyday. It was certainly the major employer of female labour in Huthwaite (New Hucknall Colliery being the major employee of males).

At some point, the hosiery factory became part of the Coats Viyella company. Coats Viyella was once one of the UK's leading textile businesses with retail (Jaeger), thread (Coats) and manufacturing (CV Clothing) businesses. Quantum Clothing Group was created as a management buy-out from Coats Viyella in December 2000. All the business's UK operations including warehousing, design, development, commercial and finance operated from this site in Huthwaite, together with a small office in Ireland. In July 2012, the Quantum Clothing Group was acquired by Japanese conglomerate Itochu Corp.

In April 2015, Ashfield District Council granted planning permission for the "demolition of the existing warehousing and factory complex".

=== Governance ===
Hucknall-under-Huthwaite was formerly a township in the parish of Sutton-in-Ashfield, in 1866 Huthwaite became a separate civil parish, from 1894 to 1907 Huthwaite was an urban district under the name "Hucknall under Huthwaite", in 1907 Huthwaite became an urban district under the name "Huthwaite", on 1 April 1935 the district and parish were abolished and merged with Sutton in Ashfield, In 1931 the parish had a population of 5092.

== Highest point ==
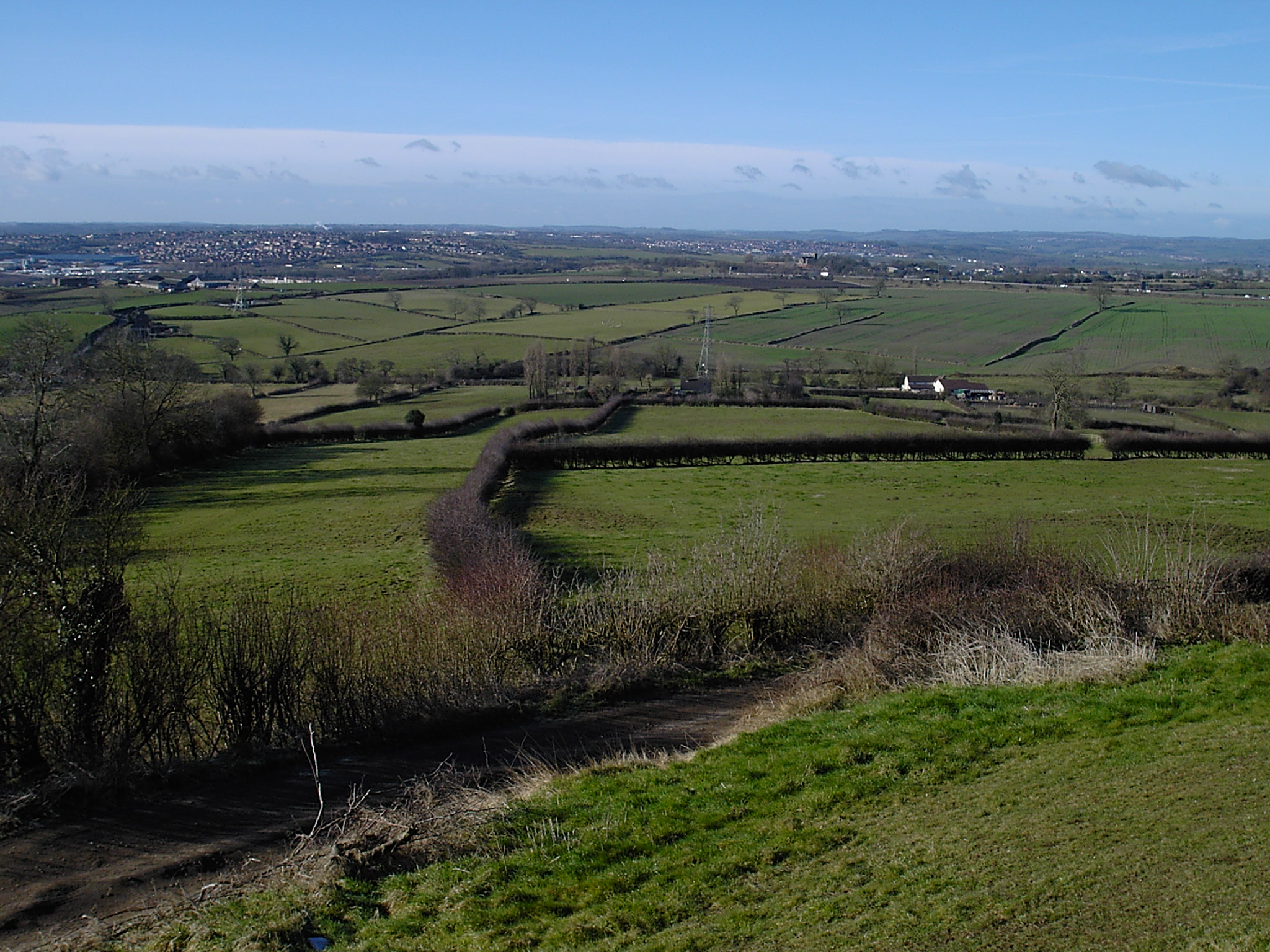
View south-west from Strawberry Bank

Strawberry Bank (OS grid ref SK4659) is the disputed highest point in Nottinghamshire. It is believed to be the highest natural point at 203m. However, Silverhill (SK4762) a mine spoil-heap on the site of the former Silverhill colliery is higher at 205m. Herrod's Hill in Huthwaite (SK4660), Newtonwood Lane in Whiteborough (SK4560) and Derby Road in Annesley (SK5054) are also contenders for the "highest point in Nottinghamshire" record.

== Notable people ==
- Chris Gascoyne, Coronation Street actor
- Star Slinger, DJ and music producer
- Andrew Hill (1946–2015), palaeoanthropologist and the J. Clayton Stephenson Professor of Anthropology at Yale University
- Yvette Tinsley LLB(Hons) PhD FRSNZ, Professor of Law at Te Herenga Waka Victoria University of Wellington
- Lee Anderson, current MP for Ashfield
- Elsie Allcock, centenarian, resident of Huthwaite since 1918
