= Yvette Tinsley =

New Zealand legal academic

Yvette Tinsley FRSNZ
- Awards: Fellow of the Royal Society Te Apārangi

Academic background
- Education: University of Birmingham
- Thesis: Identification parades: upholding the integrity of the criminal justice process? (1999)

Yvette Tinsley FRSNZ is a New Zealand law academic, and is a full professor at Victoria University of Wellington, specialising in the impacts of the justice system on its participants. In 2025 Tinsley was elected as a Fellow of the Royal Society Te Apārangi.

== Academic career ==
Tinsley completed a Bachelor of Laws and a PhD titled Identification parades: upholding the integrity of the criminal justice process? at the University of Birmingham. Tinsley then joined the Faculty of Law at Te Herenga Waka Victoria University of Wellington, rising to full professor. She is co-director of the Te Herenga Waka Centre for Justice Innovation New Zealand, and researches issues such as the experience of justice processes on participants, and their impact.

Tinsley is a member of the Principal Committee of the International Penal and Penitentiary Foundation, representing New Zealand.

In March 2025 Tinsley was elected as a Fellow of the Royal Society Te Apārangi for "her leading contribution to socio-legal research on jury decision-making, sexual offences, and lawyers’ well-being".

== Selected works ==
- Tinsley, Yvette; Claire Baylis; Warren Young (2021). ""I Think She's Learnt Her Lesson": Juror Use of Cultural Misconceptions in Sexual Violence Trials". Victoria University of Wellington Law Review. 52 (2): 463–486. doi:10.26686/vuwlr.v52i2.7128. Wikidata Q133556674.
- Yvette Tinsley (2021). Pale Shelter, Cold Hands: Making Criminal Justice Better. Victoria University of Wellington Law Review, 52(3), 623–642. https://doi.org/10.26686/vuwlr.v52i3.7335 https://ojs.victoria.ac.nz/vuwlr/article/view/7335
- Anna Carline; Clare Gunby; Vanessa Munro; Tinsley, Yvette; Kirsty Duncanson; Heather Flowe (2024). "From Emotional Labour to Affectual Bodies: Moving Towards an 'Affective Ethnography' of the Criminal Court Space". Emotion review : journal of the International Society for Research on Emotion. doi:10.1177/17540739241278244. Wikidata Q133556630.
- Elisabeth McDonald and Yvette Tinsley (eds) From Real Rape to Real Justice: Prosecuting Rape in New Zealand (2011 Victoria University Press, Wellington). ISBN 9780864736963 https://teherengawakapress.co.nz/from-real-rape-to-real-justice-prosecuting-rape-in-new-zealand/
- Benjamin Spivak; James Ogloff; Jonathan Clough; Tinsley, Yvette; Warren Young (2019). "The Impact of Fact‐Based Instructions on Juror Application of the Law: Results from a Trans‐Tasman Field Study". Social Science Quarterly. 101 (1): 346–361. doi:10.1111/ssqu.12722. Wikidata Q127219432.
- Yvette Tinsley, Science in the Criminal Courts: Tool in Service, Challenge to Legal Authority or Indispensable Ally? Oct 2013 New Zealand Universities Law Review 25(4):844-865 https://www.nzulr.com/archives/vol25no4.htm
- Kim R, Tyler N, Tinsley Y. "Wading through the worst that humanity does to each other": New Zealand Crown prosecutors' experiences of working with potentially traumatic material in the criminal justice system. Front Psychol. 2023 Jun 22;14:1164696. doi: 10.3389/fpsyg.2023.1164696. https://pubmed.ncbi.nlm.nih.gov/37425163/
- N. A. Moreham; Tinsley, Yvette (2018). "The impact of grief journalism on its subjects: lessons from the Pike River mining disaster". The Journal of Media Law. 10 (2): 189–218. doi:10.1080/17577632.2019.1592337. Wikidata Q128093943.
- Tinsley, Yvette; McDonald, Elisabeth (2011). "Use of Alternative Ways of Giving Evidence by Vulnerable Witnesses: Current Proposals, Issues and Challenges". Victoria University of Wellington Law Review. 42 (4): 705–742. doi:10.26686/vuwlr.v42i4.5112. Wikidata Q133556672.
- Tinsley, Yvette (17 December 2023). "'A diet of the most awful things humans can do' – a criminal lawyer's life". Newsroom.
