= John Shea (archaeologist) =

American archaeologist and paleoanthropologist

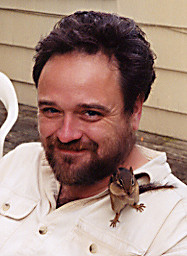
- Born: 1960 (age 65–66); Hamilton, Massachusetts

Academic background
- Education: Boston University (BA, 1982); Harvard University (PhD, 1991)
- Thesis: The Behavioral Significance of Levantine Mousterian Industrial Variability (1991)
- Doctoral advisor: Glynn Isaac; Ofer Bar-Yosef; David Pilbeam; Kwang-chih Chang

Academic work
- Discipline: Anthropology
- Sub-discipline: Paleolithic archaeology; Paleoanthropology
- Institutions: Stony Brook University

John Joseph Shea (born 9 May 1960 in Hamilton, Massachusetts) is an American archaeologist and paleoanthropologist. He has been a professor of anthropology at Stony Brook University in New York since 1992.

== Background ==
Shea was born in 1960 to Joseph P. and Gloria C. (Cyr) Shea.

In 1982 he earned a BA in Archaeology and Anthropology from Boston University and a PhD from Harvard in Anthropology in 1991. His first doctoral advisor was Glynn Isaac, after whose death, Ofer Bar-Yosef, David Pilbeam, and K.C. Chang oversaw his training.

Shea has conducted archaeological fieldwork in Israel, Jordan, Eritrea, Ethiopia, Kenya, Tanzania, Belize, New Mexico, and Massachusetts. He is married to Patricia L. Crawford and resides in Stony Brook, New York and Santa Fe, New Mexico.

== Work ==
Shea's research focuses on stone tools and how they relate to major issues in human evolution. He has experience in flintknapping and other ancient technologies. He is specialized in Paleoanthropology, the evolution of hominin behavior, pleistocene archaeology of the Near East and of Eastern Africa, lithic analysis, as well as experimental archaeology

Highlights of Shea's research include the following, in rough chronological order.

- Identification of stone-tipped spears used by Neanderthals and early Homo sapiens in the East Mediterranean Levant.
- Excavations at 'Ubeidiya, a 1.4 Million year-old site in the Jordan Valley, Israel. This research was conducted jointly with Ofer Bar-Yosef, Eitan Tchernov, Gerhard Bosinski, Sabine Gaudzinski, and Miriam Belmaker.
- Excavations at Ar Rasfa, a Middle Paleolithic site in Jordan. This research was conducted jointly with Patricia Crawford and Ghufran Sabri Ahmad (Univ. Mosul).
- Experimental and morphometric identifications of early complex projectile technology in Africa, the Near East and Europe. This work was done jointly with Zach Davis, Kyle Brown, and Mat Sisk. This project's core finding was that complex projectile technology (bow and arrow, spear thrower, and dart) were major factors in how humans dispersing from Africa displaced Neanderthals and other extinct hominins in temperate Eurasia.
- Paleoanthropology of the Lower Omo Valley Kibish Formation. This project recovered 200,000 year-old archaeological remains and fossils of the oldest-known Homo sapiens. This research was carried out with John Fleagle, Frank Brown, Solomon Yerga, Zelalem Assefa, Ian Wallace, and others.
- Proposed replacing Paleolithic archaeological research on "behavioral modernity" with a new focus on "behavioral variability."
- Stone Tools in the Paleolithic and Neolithic of the Near East: A Guide. This is a reference work for the stone tool evidence from the East Mediterranean Levant. Published in 2013, it has recently been issued in paperback.
- Stone Tools in Human Evolution. This most recent book project uses comparisons of human and non-human primate tool use to predictively model how the stone tool evidence should change as distinctive patterns of hominin behavior evolved. It tests those predictions using evidence from more than 200 archaeological sites dating from >3 million to 6000 years ago. This work was published with Cambridge University Press in 2016 (Stone Tools in Human Evolution: Behavioral Differences among Technological Primates).

In 2014 he earned the State University of New York Chancellor's Award for Excellence in Scholarship and Creative Activities.

== Publications ==
- Justin H. Pargeter, John J. Shea (2019) Going big vs. going small: Lithic miniaturization in hominin lithic technology. Evolutionary Anthropology 28 (2): 72–85.
- Hildebrand, E. A., K. M. Grillo, E. A. Sawchuk, S. K. Pfeiffer, L. B. Conyers, S. T. Goldstein, A. C. Hill, A. Janzen, C. E. Klehm, M. Helper, P. Kiura, E. Ndiema, C. Ngugi, J. J. Shea, and H. Wang. 2018. A monumental cemetery built by eastern Africa's first herders near Lake Turkana, Kenya. Proceedings of the National Academy of Sciences 115 (36): 8942.
- John J. Shea (2018) Why Teach Primitive Skills at a Research University? The Stony Brook Experience, 1992–2016. In Iron Magnolia: Essays in Honor of Shirley Strum Kenny, President of Stony Brook University, 1994 -2009. Edited by William Arens, Mario Mignone, and Margaret Gwynne, pp. 59–73. New York: Forum Italicum Publishing.
- John J. Shea (2017) Occasional, Obligatory, and Habitual Stone Tool Use in Hominin Lithic Technology. Evolutionary Anthropology 26: 200–217.* John J. Shea (2015) Making and Using Stone Tools: Advice for Learners and Teachers and Insights for Archaeologists. Lithic Technology 40 (3): 231–248.
- Stutz, A. J., J. J. Shea, J. A. Rech, J. S. Pigati, J. Wilson, M. Belmaker, R. M. Albert, T. Arpin, D. Cabanes, J. L. Clark, G. Hartman, F. Hourani, C. E. White, and L. Nilsson Stutz. 2015. Early Upper Paleolithic chronology in the Levant: new ABOx-SC accelerator mass spectrometry results from the Mughr el-Hamamah Site, Jordan. Journal of Human Evolution 85 (8): 153–173,
- John J. Shea (2015) Timescales and Variability in Hominin Technological Strategies in the Jordan Rift Valley: What Difference Does 1.3 Million Years Make? In Michael Shott (ed.) Works in Stone: Contemporary Perspectives on Lithic Analysis. Salt Lake City: University of Utah Press, pp. 33–45.
- John J. Shea (2014) Sink the Mousterian: Named stone tool industries (NASTIES) as obstacles to investigating hominin evolutionary relationships in the Later Middle Paleolithic Levant. In Huw Groucutt and Eleanor Scerri (Eds.) Lithics of the Late Middle Palaeolithic: post MIS-5 technological variability and its implications. Special Issue of Quaternary International 350: 169–179.
- John J. Shea (2013) Lithic Modes A-I: A New Framework for Describing Global-Scale Variation in Stone Tool Technology Illustrated with Evidence from the East Mediterranean Levant. Journal of Archaeological Method and Theory 20 (1): 151–186.
- Shea, J. J. 2011. Homo sapiens is as Homo sapiens was: Behavioral Variability vs. "Behavioral Modernity" in Paleolithic Archaeology. Current Anthropology 52:1-35.
- Shea, J. J. 2011. Refuting a Myth of Human Origins. American Scientist 99:128-135.

Books

- Stone Tools in Human Evolution: Behavioral Differences among Technological Primates, Cambridge University Press, 2017.
- Stone Tools in the Paleolithic and Neolithic of the Near East: A Guide. Cambridge University Press, New York 2013, ISBN 978-1-107-00698-0
- with John G. Fleagle et al. (ed.): Out of Africa I: The First Hominin Colonization of Eurasia. Springer, 2010, ISBN 978-90-481-9035-5
- with Ghufran Sabri Ahmad: Reconstructing Late Pleistocene Human Behavior in the Jordan Valley: The Middle Paleolithic Stone Tool Assemblage from Ar Rasfa. Archaeopress, Oxford (UK) 2009, ISBN 978-1-4073-0618-6
