= Alison S. Brooks =

American paleoanthropologist

Dr. Alison S. Brooks
- Awards: Médaille d'Honneur of the City of Toulouse, Doctor of Letters honoris causae, and Oscar and Shoshana Trachtenberg Prize for Faculty Scholarship, National Academy of Sciences (2020)

Academic background
- Education: Radcliffe College (B.A); Harvard University (M.A, Ph.D)
- Thesis: (1979)

Academic work
- Discipline: Anthropologist
- Sub-discipline: Paleoanthropologist and Paleolithic archaeologist
- Institutions: George Washington University, Smithsonian Institution
- Website: anthropology.columbian.gwu.edu/alison-s-brooks

Alison Spence Brooks is an American paleoanthropologist and archaeologist whose work focuses on the Paleolithic, particularly the Middle Stone Age of Africa. She is one of the most prominent figures in the debate over where Homo sapiens evolved and when. She is also known for her significant role in recording the currently earliest known documentation of projectile weaponry and fishing tools.

== Biography ==
Brooks received her BA in 1965 from Radcliffe College and a Ph.D. in Anthropology from Harvard University in 1979. She has joined George Washington University since 1972 and has been Professor of Anthropology since 1988 and is also a Research Associate in Anthropology at the Smithsonian Institution. Brooks also co-edited The Encyclopedia of Human Evolution and Prehistory. In addition to her professor role, Brooks is Director of University and External Relations for the GWU Center for the Advanced Study of Hominid Paleobiology, and she edits the bulletin AnthroNotes, distributed three times a year to individuals and institutions concerned with anthropology and public issues. She was elected a Fellow of the American Academy of Arts and Sciences in 1996, and in 2016 she was awarded the Medal of Honor (Médaille d'Honneur) of the City of Toulouse for contributions to African archaeology. In 2020 she was elected to the National Academy of Sciences.

Brooks has conducted extensive field research in the Middle Awash Valley, Ethiopia, and in the Olorgesailie Basin, Southern Kenya Rift. Her work has also included projects in Syria, Lebanon, Jordan, Sweden, France, China, Botswana, South Africa, Zimbabwe, Tanzania, and the Democratic Republic of the Congo. Brooks is also involved in the development and implication of new heritage policies in Africa.

== Research ==
Brooks's research centers around human evolution and modern human behavior. Modern human behavior was once generally thought of as beginning in Europe with the end of the Last Glacial Maximum, but Brooks and Sally McBrearty have challenged this idea. They argue that thinking that modern human behavior evolved anywhere other than in Africa erases a fundamental part of African history from the archaeological record and also from the history of every human alive today. Brooks and McBrearty explain what it means to have modern human behavior, and they review the evidence found in Africa dating back to the Middle Stone Age. They argue that the evolution of humans was not a European revolution that suddenly overtook the world and replaced everything else, but rather a gradual shift from Africa and out. Their article in the Journal of Human Evolution (2000), "The Revolution That Wasn't: A New Interpretation of the Origin of Modern Human Behavior," has been cited nearly 2000 times (as of December 2016), making it the most frequently cited article in that journal's history.

Anatomically modern Homo sapiens were widespread by 50,000 years ago, though Neanderthals were still dominant in the colder climates of Europe, Asia, and Siberia until 35,000 years ago. This period from the Middle to Upper Paleolithic is a time marked with the emergence of new technologies such as specialized bone tools and blade cores, more prominent art, larger social networks, and more advanced economic strategies. Brooks has recently found evidence of tools being used in Africa long before they were being made in Europe, which lends support to the argument that modern human behavior arose in Africa. At the Upper Semliki Valley of the eastern Democratic Republic of the Congo, she and her team have found evidence of complex technologies that date to the Middle Stone Age. They found barbed and un-barbed bone tools demonstrating that complex bone technology was in use by about 90,000 years ago in Africa, much earlier than in Europe.

Another key point in the modern human behavior debate is the early fishing evidence that Brooks and colleagues found on the lakeshore of Ishango in the Democratic Republic of the Congo. Ishango has bone harpoon technology and evidence of fishing that dates back to 90,000 years ago. Fishing is considered to be part of the Upper Paleolithic/Later Stone Age and part of modern human behavior. The fishing industry in central, northern, and eastern Africa are all based on bone harpoons found at sites. Fishing rapidly spread throughout the continent as a result of the wetter conditions that developed in Africa at this time. Fishing technologies spread as far north as Naqada, Egypt, and as far west as Aouker massif, Mauritania. Brooks's work in the DRC shows that the people of Ishango and eastern Africa were able to develop fishing technologies before the end of the Pleistocene, long before they did in Europe.

Additional research that added to the modern human behavior debate is evidence found by Brooks and colleagues of early Homo sapiens transporting resources around Olorgesailie Basin in Kenya. They found traces they found of obsidian and pigment from distances of ~20 to ~50 kilometers, from about ~320,000 years ago, during the Middle Stone Age. The use of pigments and transport of raw materials is considered part of complex symbolic behavior and technological planning associated with modern humans.
