= Andrew Hill (anthropologist) =

British palaeoanthropologist and palaeontologist

- Born: 6 June 1946; Huthwaite, Nottinghamshire, England
- Died: 12 September 2015 (aged 69)
- Education: University of Reading (BSc, 1967); Bedford College (PhD, 1975)
- Spouse: Sally McBrearty
- Scientific career
- Fields: Palaeoanthropology
- Institutions: Harvard University; Yale University
- Doctoral advisor: Walter William Bishop

Andrew Hill (1946–2015) was a British palaeoanthropologist and palaeontologist. He was the J. Clayton Stephenson Professor of Anthropology at Yale University.

== Education and career ==
Hill was born on 6 June 1946, in Huthwaite in Nottinghamshire. He studied geology and palaeontology at the University of Reading, graduating in 1967, and published his first scientific paper, on fossil chordates, the following year. He then completed a PhD under William Bishop at Bedford College.

Hill began conducting research in East Africa in 1968. After finishing his PhD in 1975, he obtained a research position with the National Museums of Kenya (NMK) and later became the director of the International Louis Leakey Memorial Institute for African Prehistory in Nairobi. Whilst based in Kenya, he conducted fieldwork at Lake Baringo and also the Sivalik Hills in Pakistan. One of his discoveries was the Laetoli Tuffs, where Mary Leakey later found the famous "Laetoli footprints".

In 1981, Hill moved to the United States for a postdoctoral fellowship at Harvard University, and in 1985 obtained a faculty position at Yale University. He remained at Yale for the rest of his career, serving as a full professor from 1992, the J. Clayton Stephenson Professor of Anthropology from 2006, the chair of the department of anthropology from 2000 to 2006, and a curator and head of division at the Peabody Museum of Natural History.

Hill was elected a fellow of the American Association for the Advancement of Science in 2009.

== Personal life ==
Hill was married to Sally McBrearty, an American palaeoanthropologist and archaeologist.
