= Elisabeth McDonald =

New Zealand feminist law academic

Elisabeth McDonald MNZM
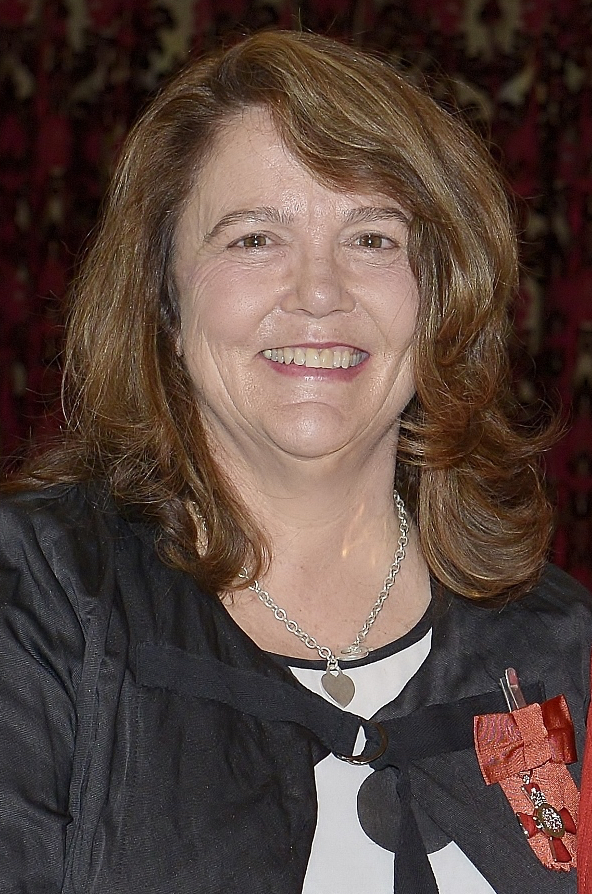
- McDonald in 2018
- Scientific career
- Fields: Feminist legal theory
- Institutions: Victoria University of Wellington; University of Canterbury

Elisabeth McDonald MNZM is a New Zealand feminist law academic. She is currently full professor at the University of Canterbury.

== Academic career ==
McDonald began a Bachelor of Laws degree at Victoria University of Wellington in 1985, followed by a Master of Laws degree at the University of Michigan. Returning to Victoria, she was appointed to staff, rising to senior lecturer in 1995 and associate professor in 2005. After 27 years at Victoria she moved to the University of Canterbury as full professor in 2017.

McDonald's research interests include the law of evidence, law and sexuality and feminist legal theory.

In the 2018 Queen's Birthday Honours, McDonald was appointed a Member of the New Zealand Order of Merit, for services to the law and education.

== Personal life ==
McDonald had a son in 1990, a daughter in 1991 and is married to Wayne Johnson, who owns a construction business.

== Selected works ==
- McDonald, Elisabeth, and Yvette Tinsley, eds. From "Real Rape" to Real Justice: Prosecuting Rape in New Zealand. Victoria University Press, 2011.
- McDonald, Elisabeth. "Gender bias and the law of evidence: The link between sexuality and credibility." Victoria U. Wellington L. Rev. 24 (1994): 175.
- Mahoney, Richard, Elisabeth McDonald, Scott Optican, and Yvette Tinsley. The Evidence Act 2006: Act & Analysis. Thomson Reuters, 2010.
- McDonald, Elisabeth. "'Real Rape'in New Zealand: Women Complainants' Experience of the Court Process." (1997).
- McDonald, Elisabeth. "Provocation, sexuality and the actions of 'thoroughly decent men'." Women's Studies Journal 9, no. 2 (1993): 126.
- McDonald, Elisabeth. "No straight answer: Homophobia as both an aggravating and mitigating factor in New Zealand homicide cases." Victoria U. Wellington L. Rev. 37 (2006): 223.
