= The Journal of Media Law =

The Journal of Media Law is a biannual peer-reviewed academic journal published by Hart Publishing. It was established in 2009 and is indexed by EBSCOhost, Academic Search Complete, and Applied Science & Technology Abstracts. The editors-in-chief are Jacob Rowbottom (University College, Oxford), Nicole Moreham (Victoria University of Wellington), and Andrew Kenyon (Melbourne Law School).
