= Palaeoarchaeology =

Study of human activity in the distant past

Palaeoarchaeology (or paleoarcheology) is the archaeology of deep time. Paleoarchaeologists' studies focus on hominin fossils ranging from around 7,000,000 to 10,000 years ago, and human evolution and the ways in which humans have adapted to the environment in the past few million years.

Interest in the field of study began in the late 1850s and early 1860s, with a shift in interest caused by the discoveries made by Boucher de Perthes, after Joseph Prestwich, Hugh Falconer, and John Evans had visited Boucher de Perthes's site in the Somme valley themselves. Two such archaeologists who had been attracted to join archaeological societies by palaeoarchaeology were Augustus Pitt Rivers and Edward Burnett Tylor. Evans, Pitt Rivers, and John Lubbock all promoted interest in the field. In 1868, for example, they together organised, in conjunction with the annual general meeting in Norwich of the British Association for the Advancement of Science, the Third International Congress of Prehistoric Archaeology.

The majority of paleoarchaeology sites are found in Southern and Eastern Africa. Some of the most productive sites have been those of Hadar, Sterkfontein, Kanapoi, and Olduvai Gorge.

Paleoarchaeology deals with ancient human remains which presents difficulties in the field. Remains are often found incomplete. In addition, paleoarchaeologists often deal with remains that lie somewhere between their primate ancestors and modern humans. Similar finds can be rare so paleoarchaeologists must rely on the reanalysis of existing fossils.

In addition to the traditional methods of archaeology and physical anthropology, linguistics, paleogenomics, geography and various fields of environmental studies are used to explore the questions in the field.
