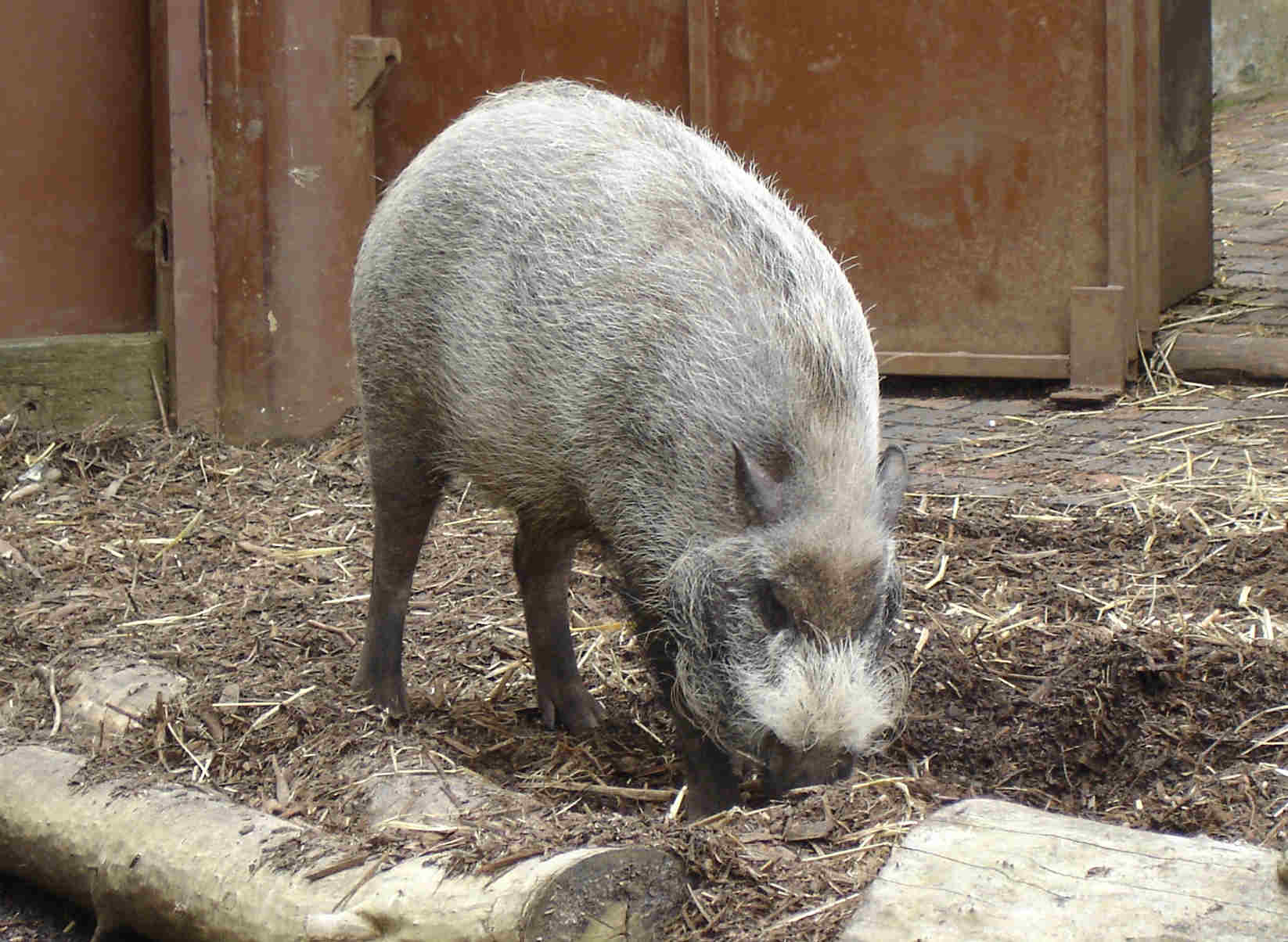
- Bearded pig (Sus barbatus) at the San Diego Zoo

Scientific classification
- Domain: Eukaryota
- Kingdom: Animalia
- Phylum: Chordata
- Class: Mammalia
- Order: Artiodactyla
- Family: Suidae
- Subfamily: Suinae; Gray, 1821

Genera
- Babyrousa; Hylochoerus; Potamochoerus; Phacochoerus; Porcula; Sus

= Suinae =

Suinae Temporal range: Miocene to recent

Subfamily of mammals

Suinae is a subfamily of artiodactyl mammals that includes several of the extant members of Suidae and their closest relatives – the domestic pig and related species, such as babirusas. Several extinct species within the Suidae are classified in subfamilies other than Suinae. However, the classification of the extinct members of the Suoidea – the larger group that includes the Suidae, the peccary family (Tayassuidae), and related extinct species – is controversial, and different classifications vary in the number of subfamilies within Suidae and their contents. Some classifications, such as the one proposed by paleontologist Jan van der Made in 2010, even exclude from Suinae some extant taxa of Suidae, placing these excluded taxa in other subfamilies.

== Classification ==
In their 1997 Classification of Mammals, Malcolm C. McKenna and Susan K. Bell classify the Suinae as:

- Tribe Suini
  - Genus †Eumaiochoerus (Miocene)
  - Genus †Hippopotamodon (Miocene to Pleistocene)
  - Genus †Korynochoerus (Miocene to Pliocene)
  - Genus †Microstonyx (Miocene)
  - Genus Porcula
  - Genus Sus (Miocene to Recent)
- Tribe Potamochoerini
  - Genus †Celebochoerus (Pliocene to Pleistocene)
  - Genus †Kolpochoerus (Pliocene to Pleistocene)
  - Genus Potamochoerus (Miocene to recent)
  - Genus †Propotamochoerus (Miocene to Pliocene)
- Tribe †Hippohyini
  - Genus †Hippohyus (Pliocene)
  - Genus †Sinohyus (Pliocene)
  - Genus †Sivahyus (Pliocene)
- Tribe Phacochoerini
  - Genus †Metridiochoerus (Pliocene to Pleistocene)
  - Genus Phacochoerus (Pliocene to recent)
  - Genus Hylochoerus (Pleistocene to recent)
  - Genus †Potamochoeroides (Pliocene, possibly Pleistocene)
  - Genus †Stylochoerus (Pleistocene)
- Tribe Babyrousini
  - Genus Babyrousa (Pleistocene to recent)

In the 2005 third edition of Mammal Species of the World, which treats only recent forms, Peter Grubb followed this classification. The recent forms are wild boars, domestic pigs, and pygmy hogs together in one tribe, with warthogs, a genus of African pigs, and a genus of pigs from the islands of Wallacea each representing a separate clade.

== Literature cited ==
- Grubb, P. 2005. Order Artiodactyla. Pp. 637–722 in Wilson, D.E. and Reeder, D.M. (eds.). Mammal Species of the World: a taxonomic and geographic reference. 3rd ed. Baltimore: The Johns Hopkins University Press, 2 vols., 2142 pp. ISBN 978-0-8018-8221-0
- McKenna, M.C. and Bell, S.K. 1997. Classification of Mammals: Above the species level. New York: Columbia University Press, 631 pp. ISBN 978-0-231-11013-6
- Orliac, M.J., Antoine, P.-O. and Ducrocq, S. 2010. Phylogenetic relationships of the Suidae (Mammalia, Cetartiodactyla): new insights on the relationships within Suoidea (subscription required). Zoologica Scripta 39:315–330.
- Van der Made, J. 2010. The pigs and "Old World peccaries" (Suidae and Palaeochoeridae, Suoidea, Artiodactyla) from the Miocene of Sandelzhausen (southern Germany): phylogeny and an updated classification of the Hyotheriinae and Palaeochoeridae (subscription required). Paläontologische Zeitschrift 84:43–121.
