= Babyrousa bolabatuensis =

Conservation status
- CITES Appendix I (CITES)

Scientific classification
- Kingdom: Animalia
- Phylum: Chordata
- Class: Mammalia
- Order: Artiodactyla
- Family: Suidae
- Genus: Babyrousa
- Species: B. bolabatuensis

Binomial name
- Babyrousa bolabatuensis Hooijer, 1950

Species of mammal

Babyrousa bolabatuensis, the Bola Batu babirusa, is a species of babirusa from the Indonesian island of Sulawesi. It was first described in 1950 as a subspecies of Babyrousa babyrussa, then the only recognized species of babirusa, and raised to species rank by Colin Groves and Erik Meijaard in 2002. At present the Bola Batu babirusa is only known for certain from subfossil remains from the southern arm of Sulawesi. Based on a single skull from central Sulawesi it has been suggested that babirusas from this part of Sulawesi represent an extant population of the Bola Batu babirusa, and this was followed in the third edition of Mammal Species of the World. However, the most recent major review also found similarities between the central Sulawesi specimen and the Togian babirusa, leading them to conclude that it represents an undescribed taxon and that the taxonomic position of central Sulawesi babirusas only can be determined through additional specimens. Subfossil remains from the south-western arm of Sulawesi, where now likely extinct, have been classified as Bola Batu babirusas, but these were considered unclassifiable in 2002, as were extant populations from the eastern arm of Sulawesi and Buton due to the lack of specimens. Due to these uncertainties, the IUCN Red List provisionally synonymized B. bolabatuensis under the northern Sulawesi species, B. celebensis, pending clarification of the taxonomy of Sulawesi babirusas.

== Literature cited ==
- Groves, Colin (1980). "Notes on the systematics of Babyrousa (Artiodactyla, Suidae)" (PDF). Zoologische Mededelingen. 55: 29–46.
- Grubb, Peter (2005). "Order Artiodactyla". In Wilson, D. E.; Reeder, D. M. (eds.). Mammal Species of the World: a taxonomic and geographic reference (3 ed.). Baltimore: The Johns Hopkins University Press. pp. 637–722. ISBN 0-8018-8221-4.
- Leus, K.; Macdonald, A.; Burton, J; Rejeki, I. (2016). "Babyrousa celebensis (Sulawesi Babirusa)". IUCN Red List of Threatened Species. 2016 e.T136446A44142964. doi:10.2305/IUCN.UK.2016-1.RLTS.T136446A44142964.en.
- Meijaard, Eric; Groves, Colin (2002). "Upgrading three subspecies of babirusa (Babyrousa sp.) to full species level". Asian Wild Pig News. 2 (2): 33–39.
