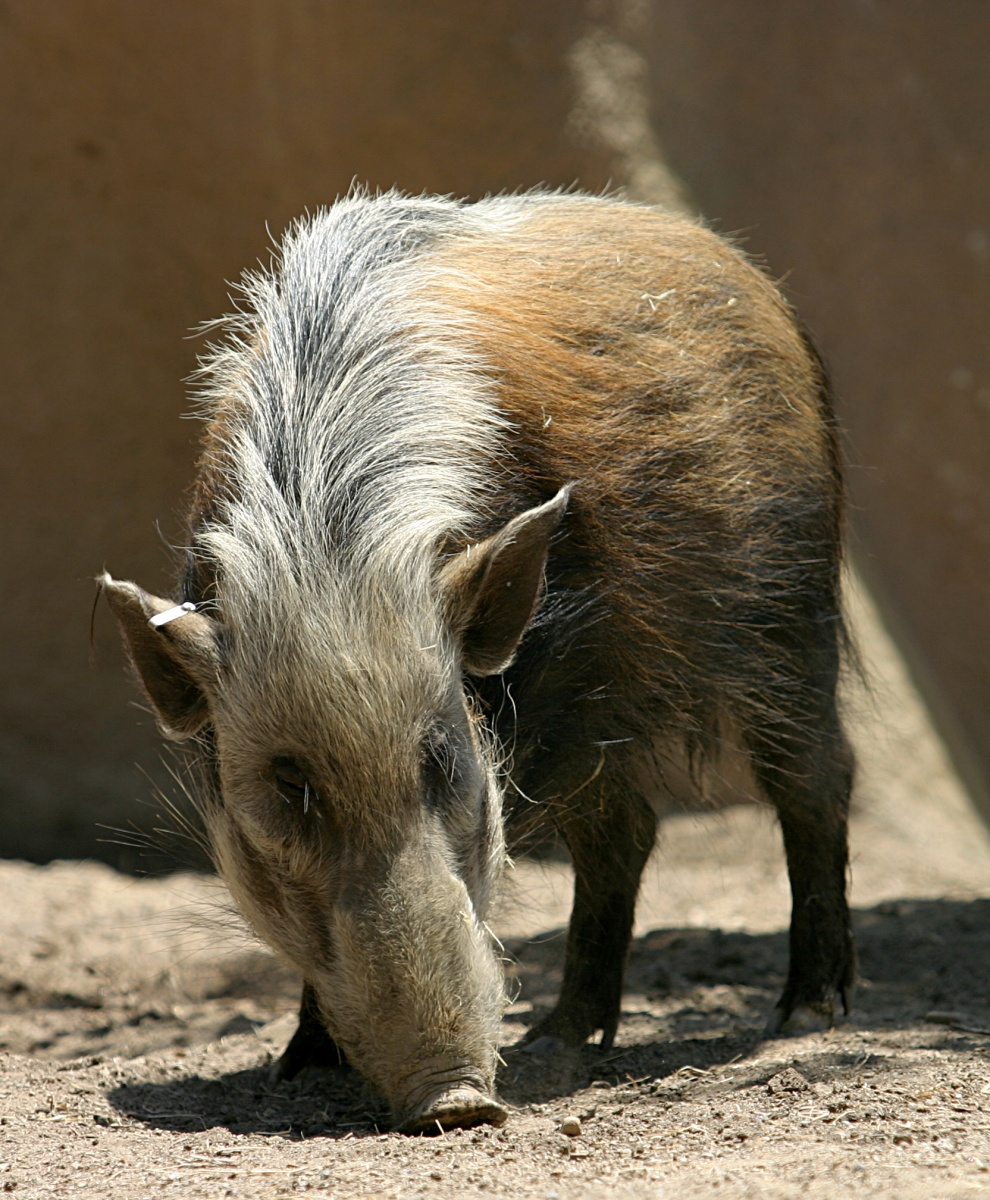
- A bushpig

Scientific classification
- Domain: Eukaryota
- Kingdom: Animalia
- Phylum: Chordata
- Class: Mammalia
- Order: Artiodactyla
- Family: Suidae
- Subfamily: Suinae
- Tribe: Potamochoerini

Genera
- †Celebochoerus; Hylochoerus; †Kolpochoerus; Potamochoerus; †Propotamochoerus

= Potamochoerini =

Potamochoerini Temporal range: 11.608–0 Ma

Tribe of mammals

Potamochoerini is a tribe of even-toed ungulates which encompasses the giant forest hogs and the river pigs.
