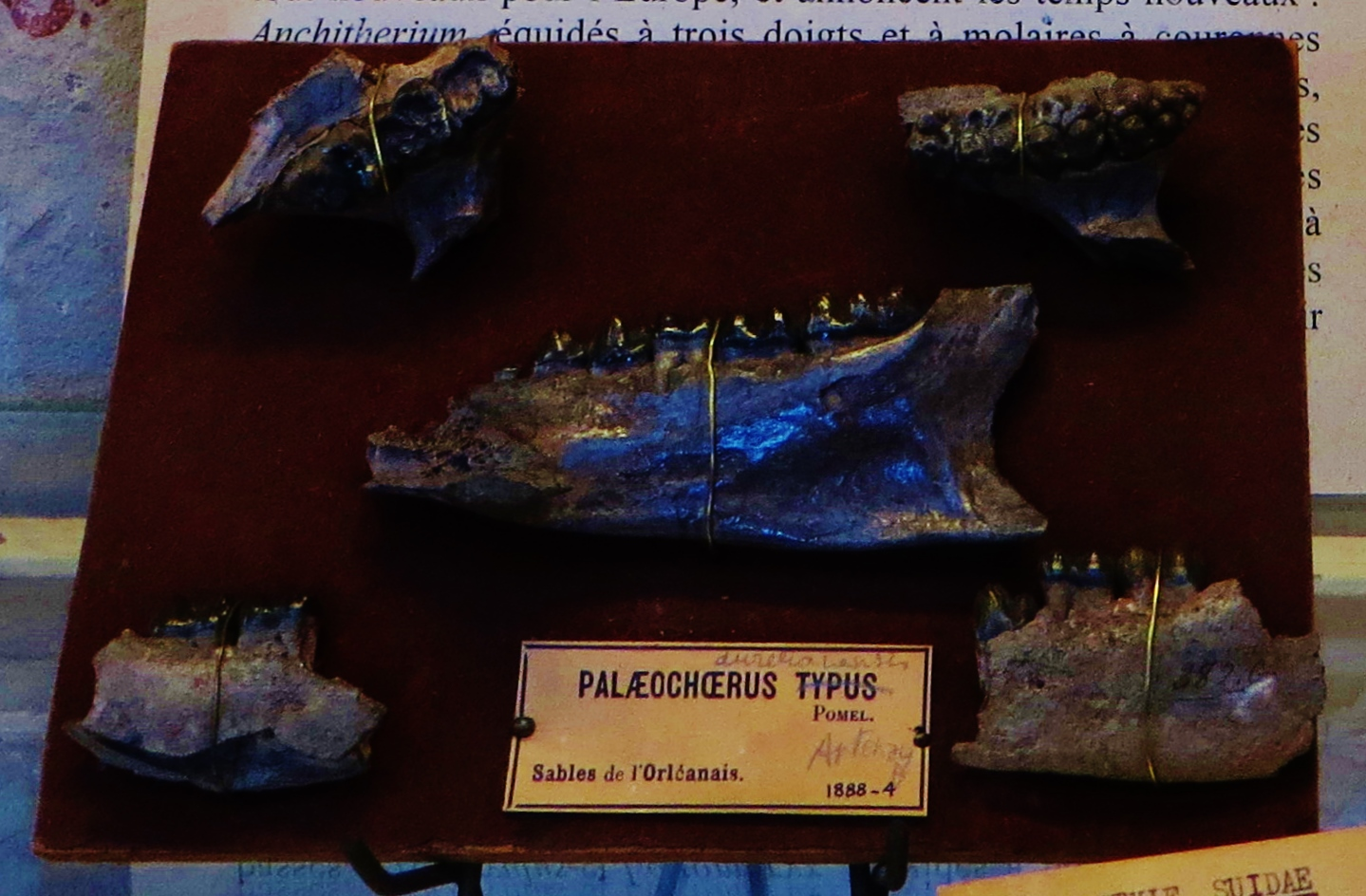
- Fossil of Aureliachoerus aurelianensis (labeled as Palaeochoerus) at the Gallery of Paleontology and Comparative Anatomy, Paris.

Scientific classification
- Kingdom: Animalia
- Phylum: Chordata
- Class: Mammalia
- Order: Artiodactyla
- Family: Suidae
- Subfamily: †Hyotheriinae
- Genus: †Aureliachoerus; Ginsburg, 1974

Type species
- †Aureliachoerus aurelianensis Stehlin, 1899

Species
- A. aurelianensis; A. minus

= Aureliachoerus =

Aureliachoerus Temporal range: 16.9–12.75 Ma

Extinct genus of mammals

Aureliachoerus was an extinct genus of suids that existed during the Miocene in Europe.

The species Aureliachoerus aurelianensis was originally considered a species of Palaeochoerus. The second species, A. minus was smaller than A. aurelianensis and had less complex molars.
