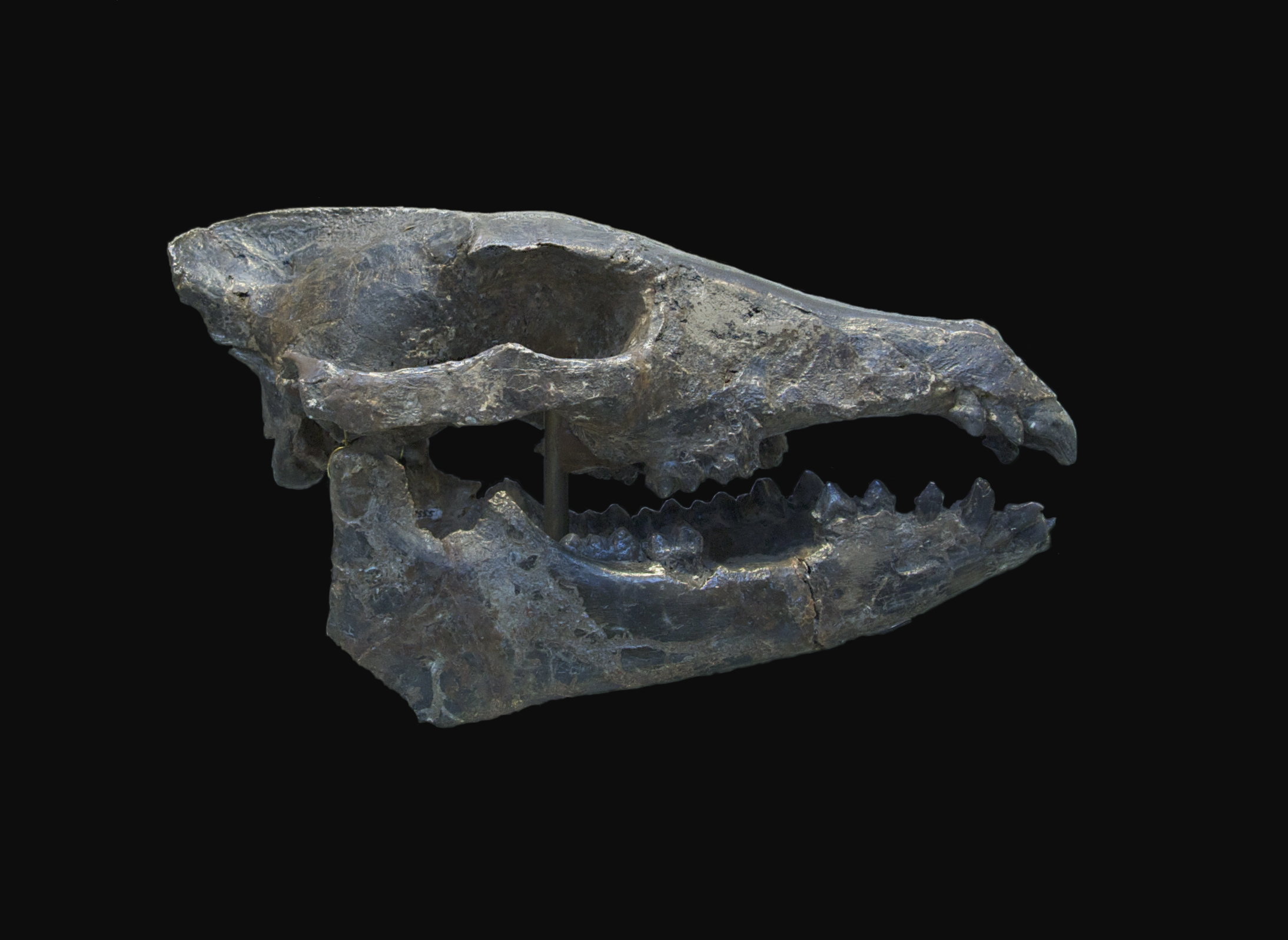
- Hyotherium major skull, MNHN

Scientific classification
- Kingdom: Animalia
- Phylum: Chordata
- Class: Mammalia
- Order: Artiodactyla
- Family: Suidae
- Subfamily: †Hyotheriinae
- Genus: †Hyotherium von Meyer, 1834

Type species
- †Hyotherium soemmeringi von Meyer, 1834

Species
- H. meissneri; H. major; H. shanwangense; H. soemmeringi

= Hyotherium =

Hyotherium Temporal range: Oligocene–Miocene

Extinct genus of mammals

Hyotherium (meaning "pig beast", due to its resemblance to modern day pigs.) was an extinct genus of even-toed ungulates under the Hyotheriinae group (a group that also consists of Chicochoerus, Xenohyus and more) of the Suidae family. It existed during the Miocene in Europe and Perim Island, India. It was named by Von Mayer in 1834.

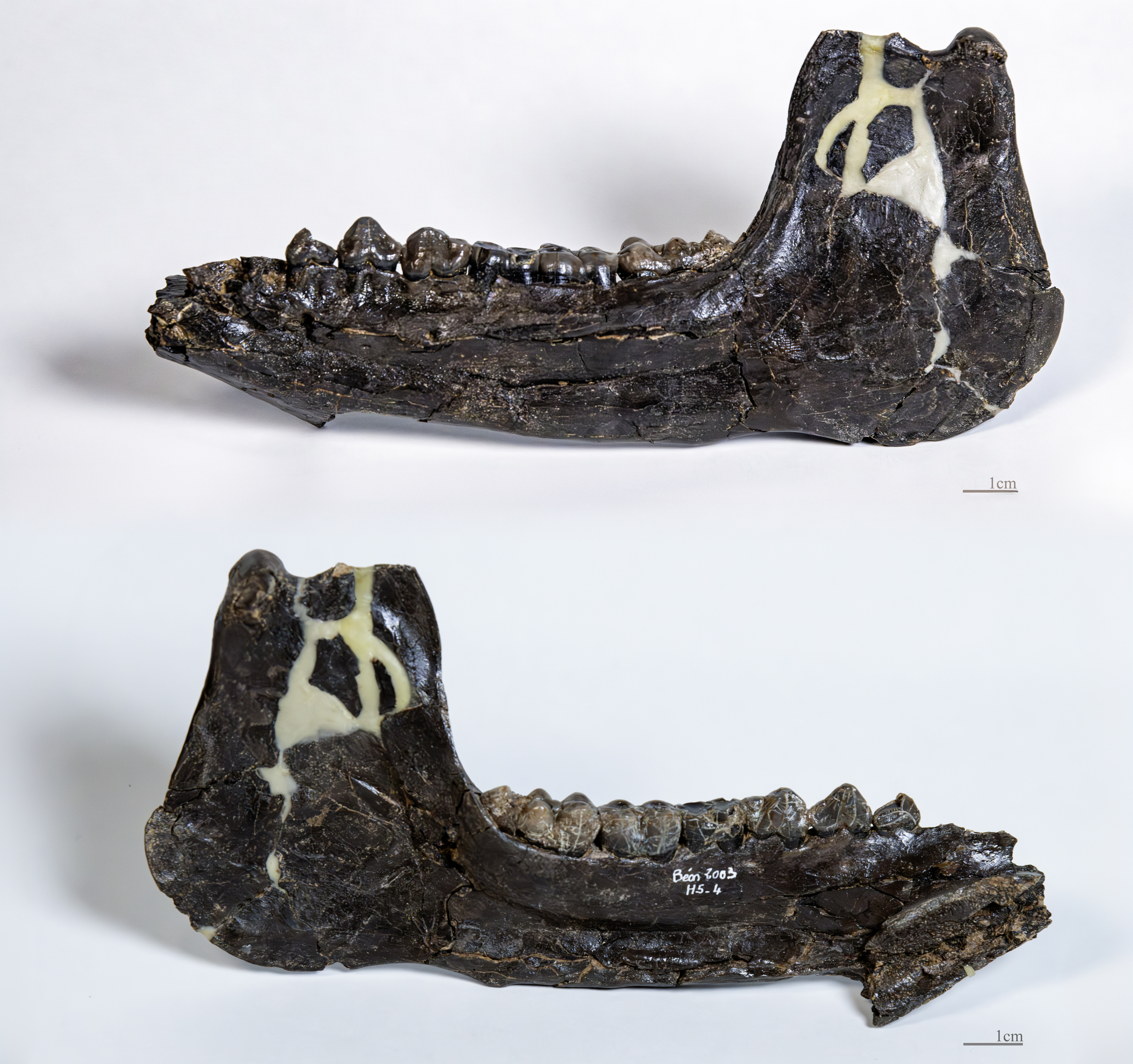
Hyotherium lacaillei Left Mandible - Holotype MHNT

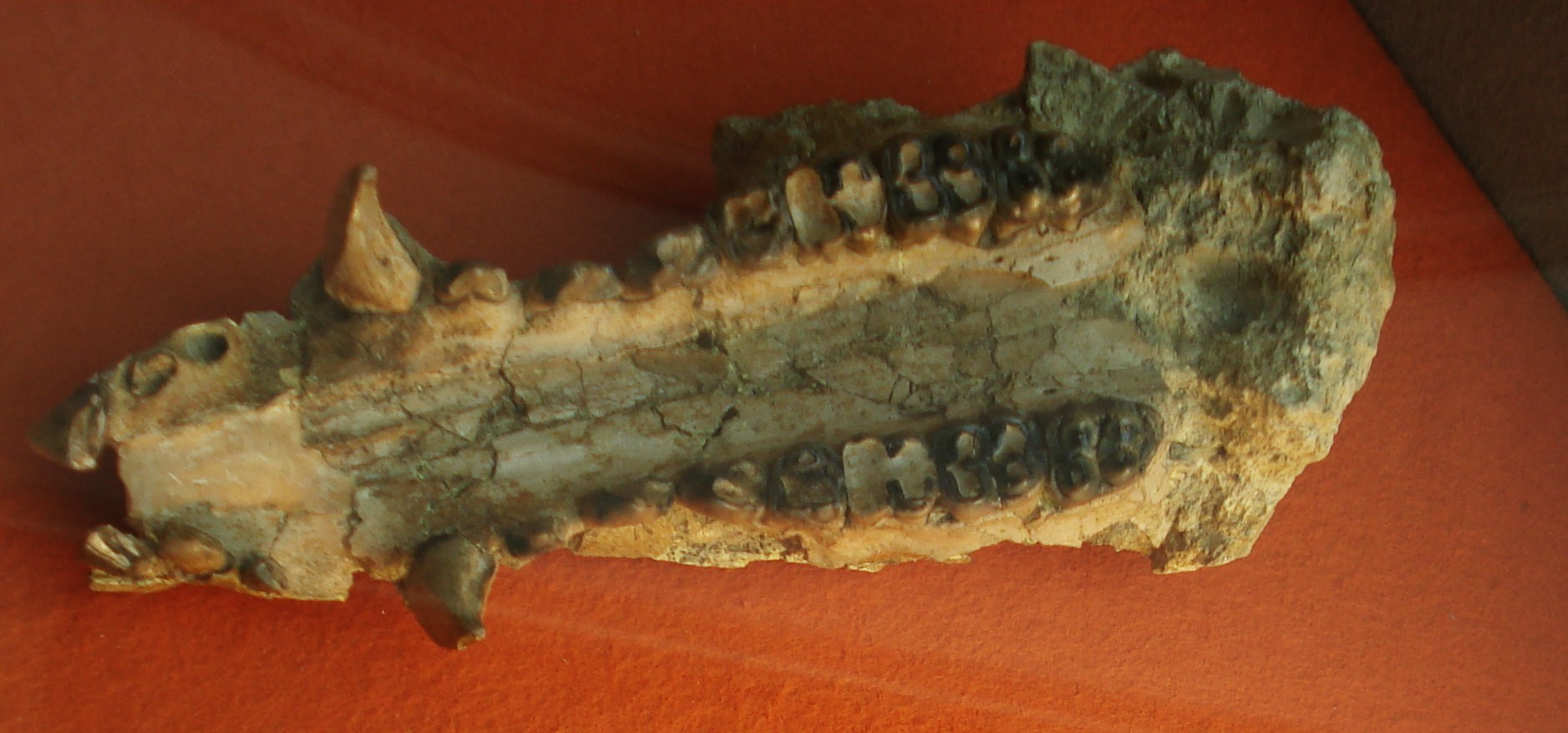
Hyotherium soemmeringi jaw
