= Celebochoerus cagayanensis =

Celebochoerus cagayanensis Temporal range: Middle Pleistocene

Scientific classification
- Kingdom: Animalia
- Phylum: Chordata
- Class: Mammalia
- Order: Artiodactyla
- Family: Suidae
- Genus: †Celebochoerus
- Species: †C. cagayanensis

Binomial name
- †Celebochoerus cagayanensis Ingicco et al 2016

Extinct species of pig from the Philippines

Celebochoerus cagayanensis is an extinct species of suid in the genus Celebochoerus. The first fossil specimen was discovered in 2016 in the Philippines. It differs from the Sulawesi species Celebochoerus heekereni in that it has mesial and distal enamel bands on its upper canines. It also has huge upper tusks. The animal's features are symplesiomorphic in suids, indicating a Philippines to Sulawesi migration route. They can be viewed at the National Museum of the Philippines.
