= Dirk Albert Hooijer =

Dutch paleontologist (1919–1993)

- Born: 30 May 1919; Medan, Dutch East Indies
- Died: 26 November 1993 (aged 74); Leiden, Netherlands
- Occupation: Paleontologist

Dirk Albert Hooijer (30 May 1919 – 26 November 1993) was a Dutch paleontologist.

Hooijer was born in Medan on Sumatra, but spent his youth in Bogor on Java. In 1932, his family moved to The Hague where he finished his high school education at Dalton Den Haag school in 1937. Subsequently, he studied geology on the University of Leiden. In 1941 he joined the staff of the Rijksmuseum van Natuurlijke Historie in Leiden, where he was especially interested in fossil rhinoceroses and hippopotami. In 1946, he became curator of the Dubois collection. In the same year he promoted under Professor Hilbrand Boschma (1893–1976) with his dissertation Prehistoric and fossil Rhinoceroses from the Malay Archipelago and India. From 1950 to 1951 he got a Rockefeller fellowship and worked at the American Museum of Natural History in New York City. From 1970 until his retirement in 1979 he was professor at the University of California, Irvine.

Hooijer published 267 scientific articles about vertebrate fossils from Indonesia, Africa, the Near East (especially Israel), the Netherlands, the Antilles, and South America. Many of these works were devoted to fossil rhinoceroses, cats, hogs, rodents, primates, and probiscoidae. He described six new genera, including Celebochoerus, Chilotheridium, Epileptobos, Paradiceros, Paulocnus, and Spelaeomys and 47 new species and subspecies, including Babyrousa bolabatuensis, Elephas celebensis and the Flores Cave Rat.

Hooijer was married and had two daughters and one son. He died in Leiden, Netherlands.
