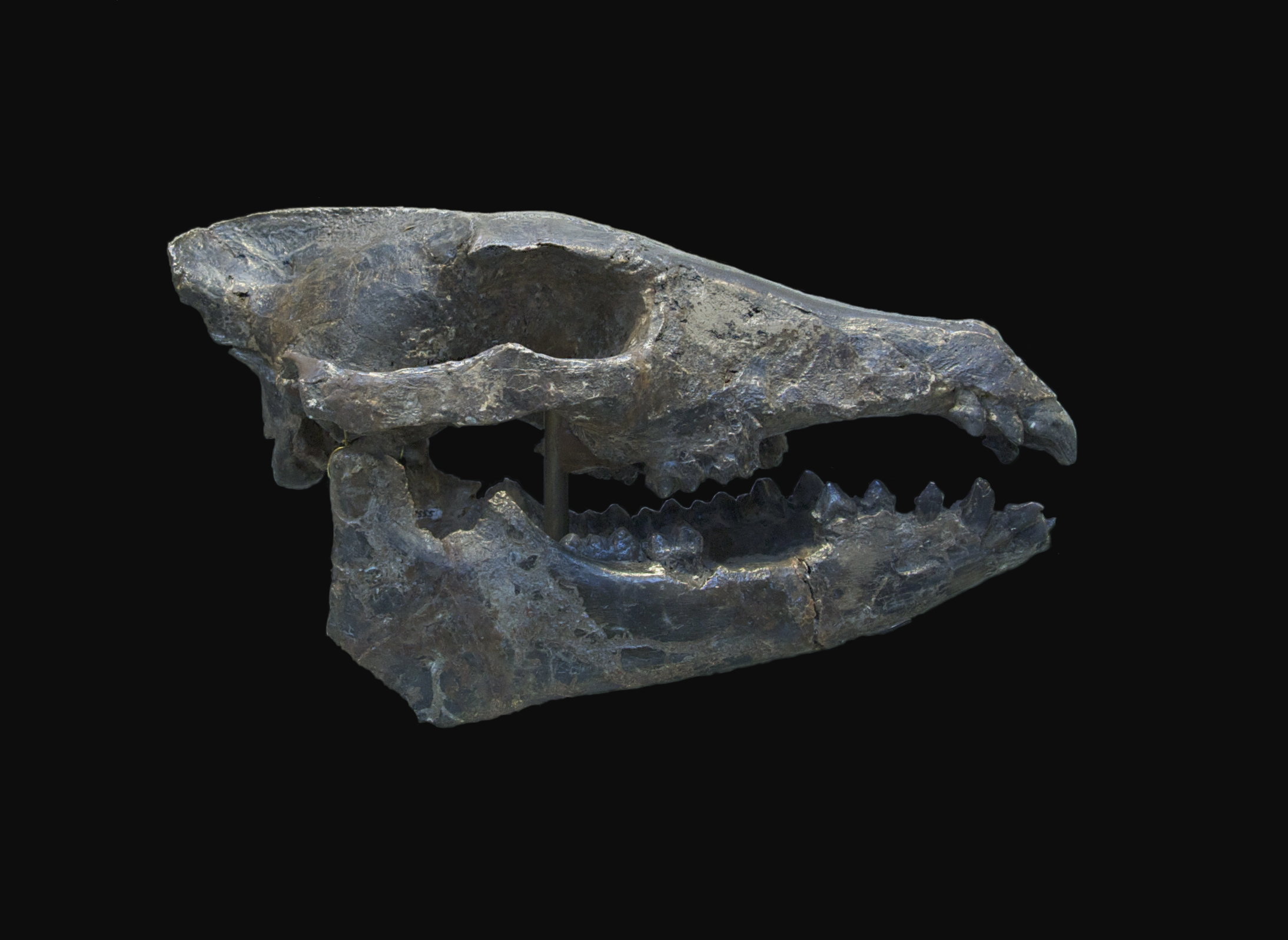
- A Hyotherium major skull, MNHN

Scientific classification
- Kingdom: Animalia
- Phylum: Chordata
- Class: Mammalia
- Order: Artiodactyla
- Family: Suidae
- Subfamily: †Hyotheriinae; Cope, 1888

= Hyotheriinae =

Hyotheriinae Temporal range: 20.43–4.9 Ma

Extinct subfamily of mammals

Hyotheriinae was a subfamily of even-toed ungulates that existed during the Miocene and Pliocene in Europe, Asia, and Africa.

== Genera ==
- †Aureliachoerus Ginsburg, 1974 - Miocene, Europe
- †Chicochoerus Orliac et al., 2006 - Miocene, Europe
- †Chleuastochoerus Pearson, 1928 - Miocene and Pliocene, Asia
- †Hyotherium von Meyer, 1834 - Miocene, Europe and Asia
- †Nguruwe Pickford, 1986 - (previously located in the subfamily of Kubanochoerinae) Miocene, Africa
- †Xenohyus Ginsburg, 1980 - Miocene, Europe
