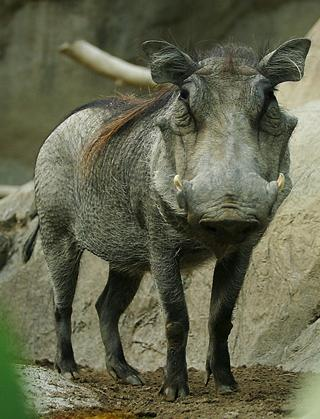
- A common warthog (Phacochoerus africanus)

Scientific classification
- Domain: Eukaryota
- Kingdom: Animalia
- Phylum: Chordata
- Class: Mammalia
- Order: Artiodactyla
- Family: Suidae
- Subfamily: Suinae
- Tribe: Phacochoerini

Genera
- †Metridiochoerus; Phacochoerus; †Potamochoeroides; †Stylochoerus

= Phacochoerini =

Phacochoerini Temporal range: 2.588–0 Ma

Extinct tribe of mammals

Phacochoerini is a tribe of even-toed ungulates which encompasses the warthogs.
