= Chicochoerus =

Scientific classification
- Domain: Eukaryota
- Kingdom: Animalia
- Phylum: Chordata
- Class: Mammalia
- Order: Artiodactyla
- Family: Suidae
- Subfamily: †Hyotheriinae
- Genus: †Chicochoerus; Orliac et al., 2006

Extinct genus of even-toed ungulates

Chicochoerus is an extinct member of the Hyotheriinae subfamily within the family Suidae that existed during the Miocene in Gers, France. It was named by Orliac et al. in 2006.
