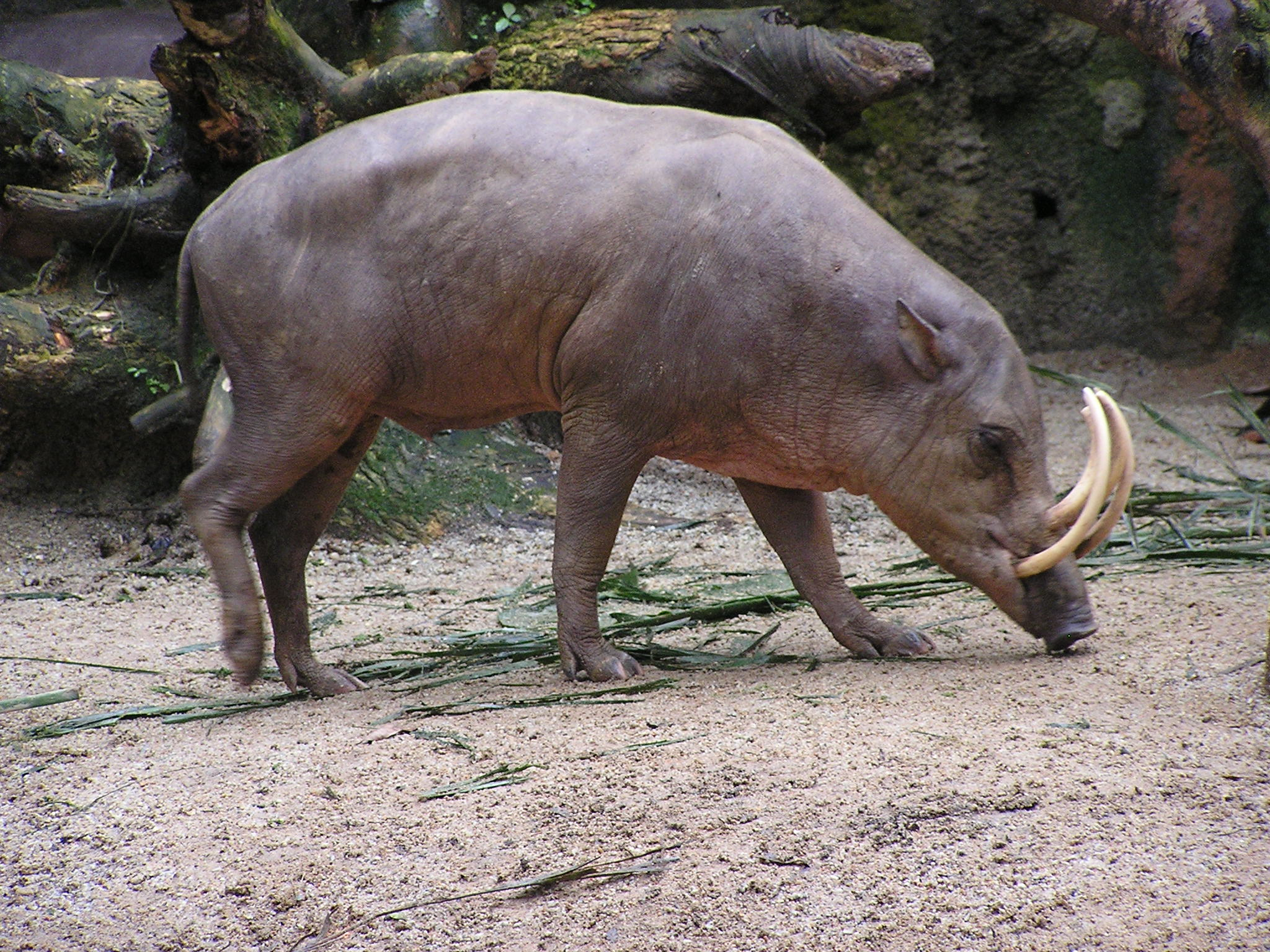
- Adult male
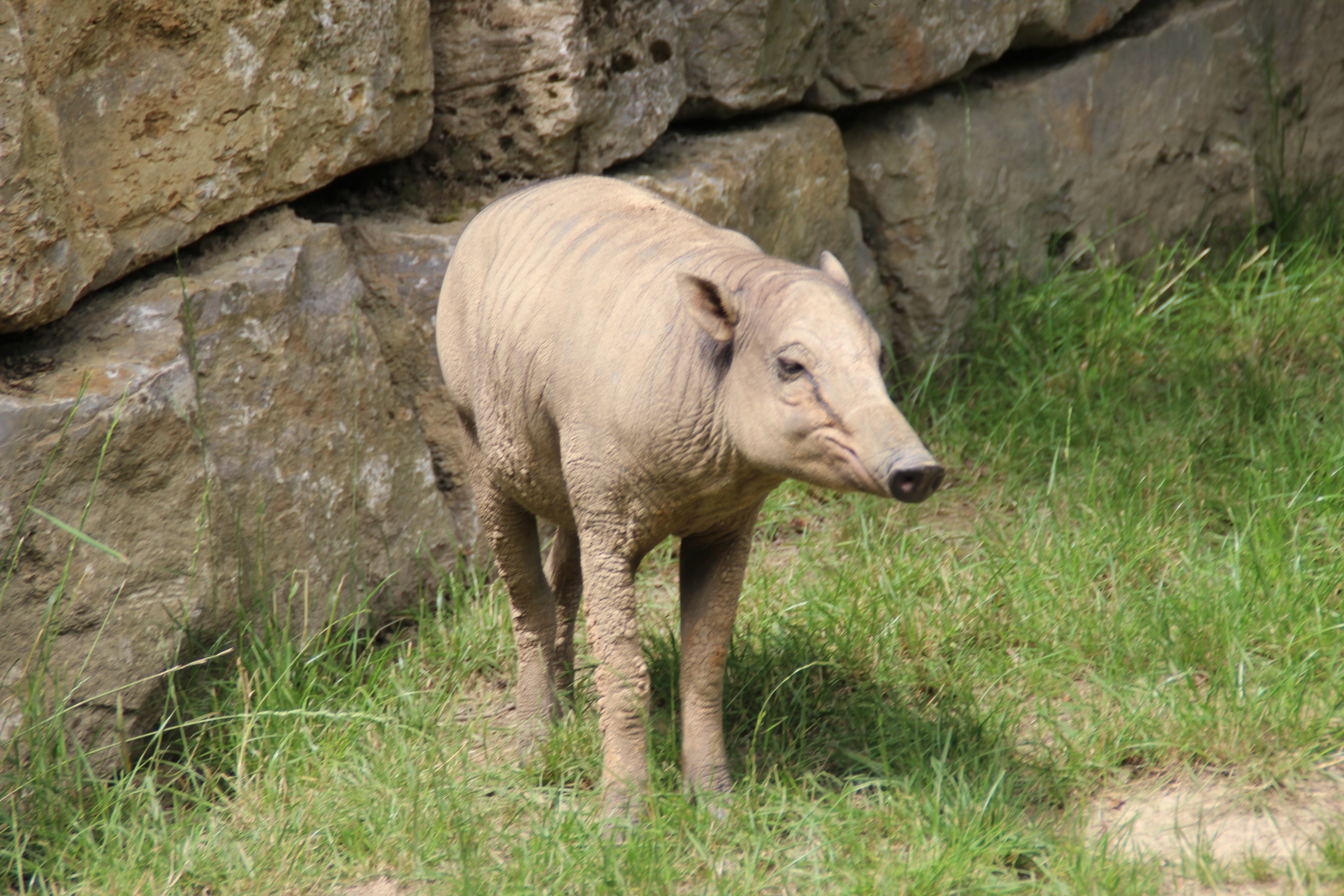
- Female at Opel Zoo

Conservation status
- Vulnerable (IUCN 3.1)
- CITES Appendix I

Scientific classification
- Kingdom: Animalia
- Phylum: Chordata
- Class: Mammalia
- Order: Artiodactyla
- Family: Suidae
- Genus: Babyrousa
- Species: B. celebensis

Binomial name
- Babyrousa celebensis Deninger, 1909

= North Sulawesi babirusa =

Species of mammal

The North Sulawesi babirusa (Babyrousa celebensis) is a species of suid native to Sulawesi and some nearby islands (Lembeh, Buton and Muna) in Indonesia. It has two pairs of large tusks composed of enlarged canine teeth. The upper canines penetrate the top of the snout, curving back toward the forehead. The North Sulawesi babirusa is threatened from hunting and deforestation.

The common and scientific names are various transcriptions of its local name, which literally translated means "pig-deer" (from Indonesian babi, "pig" + rusa, "deer" – see also Javan rusa) in reference to the huge tusks of the male suggestive of a deer's antlers.

== Classification ==
Together with the other members of the genus Babyrousa, the North Sulawesi babirusa has usually been considered a subspecies of a widespread Babyrousa babyrussa, but recent work suggests that there may be several species, differentiable on the basis of geography, body size, amount of body hair, and the shape of the upper canine tooth of the male. Following the split, the "true" Babyrousa babyrussa is restricted to Buru and the Sula Islands.

Most experts agree that babirusas are part of the pig family, and are one of the oldest living members of the family, representing a subfamily, Babyrousinae, that branched off from the warthog branch of the pig family (Subfamily Phacochoerini) during the Oligocene or early Miocene.

== Appearance ==
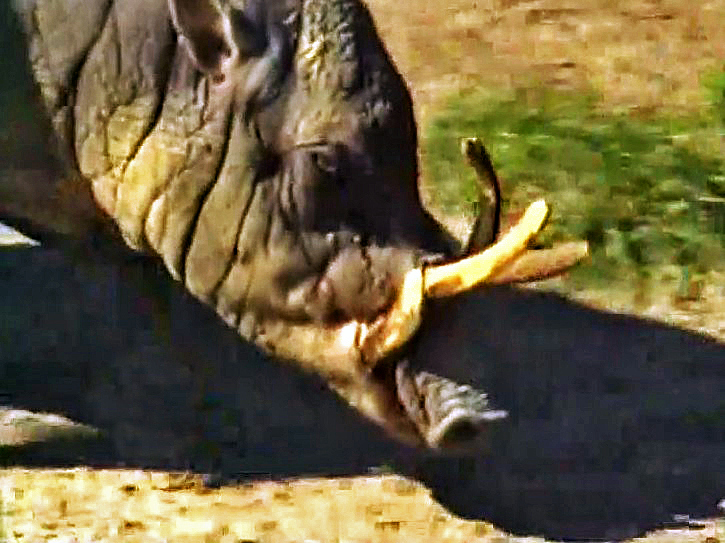
Head of B. celebensis in Berlin zoo

The North Sulawesi babirusa has a head-and-body length of 85–110 cm (33–43 in) and weighs up to 100 kg (220 lb). It is virtually hairless (easily revealing its greyish skin), and the tail-tuft is also nearly hairless. In males, the relatively long and thick upper canines are strongly curved. They emerge through the roof of the snout, while the long lower canines emerge through the side of the mouth. The upper canines can grow backwards in a curve until they penetrate the skull of the male babirusa.

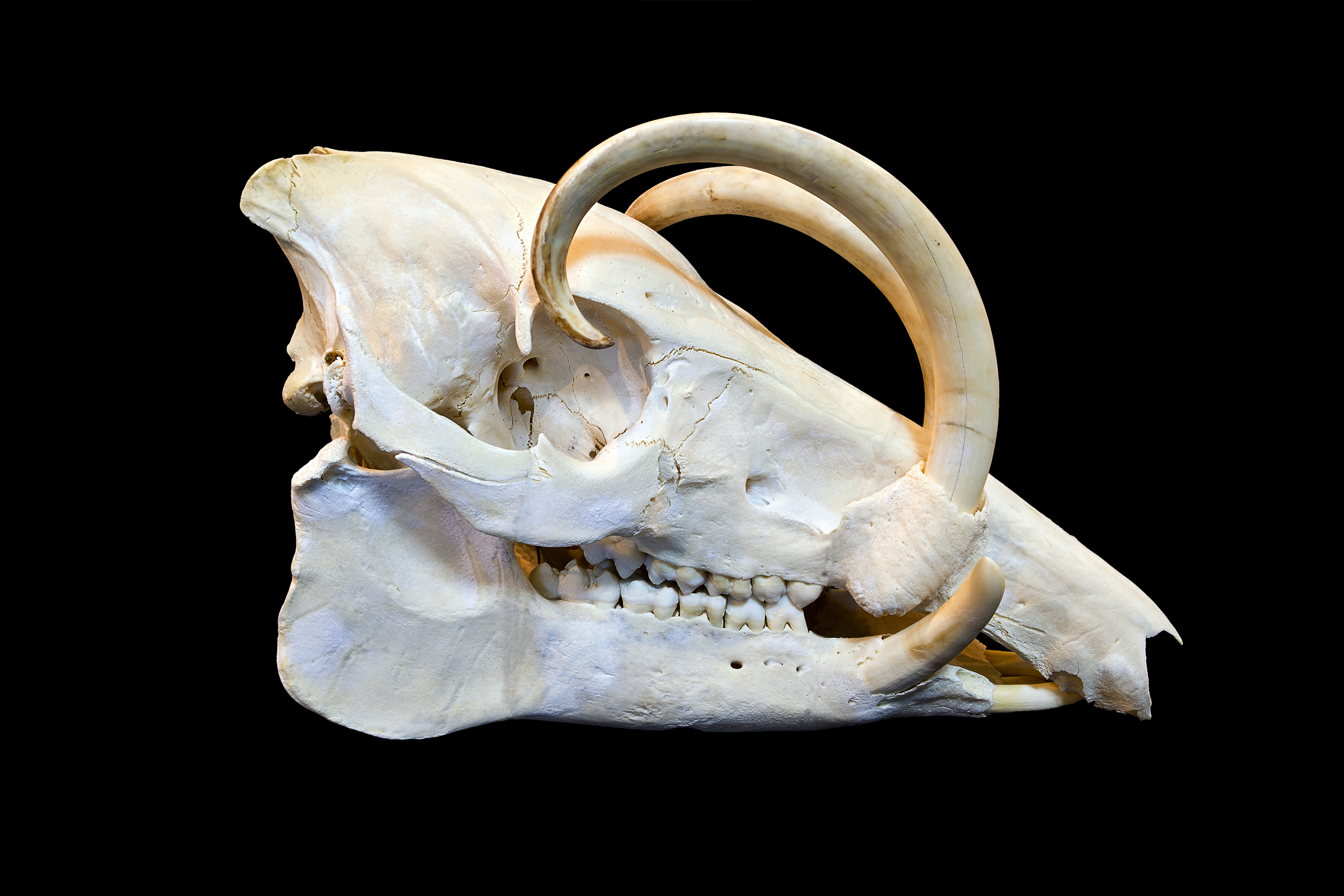
Skull of adult male

In females, the canines are far shorter and typically do not protrude. In comparison, the Buru babirusa has relatively long, thick body hair, a well-developed tail-tuft, and relatively short and slender upper canines in males, while the Togian babirusa is larger, has a relatively well-developed tail-tuft, and the upper canines of the male are "short, slender, rotated forwards, and always converge".

== Habitat ==
Its habitat is the underbrush of tropical forests and canebrakes, and the shores of rivers and lakes. Its mostly-hairless, mottled-grey-and-brown hide provide it with a degree of camouflage. The North Sulawesi Babirusa is known for its two pairs of tusks; both its upper and its lower pairs of canine teeth are greatly enlarged, and curve up and back towards the head. The upper canines of the male are so curved and enlarged that they emerge through the flesh, by way of holes, to pass through the top of the snout.

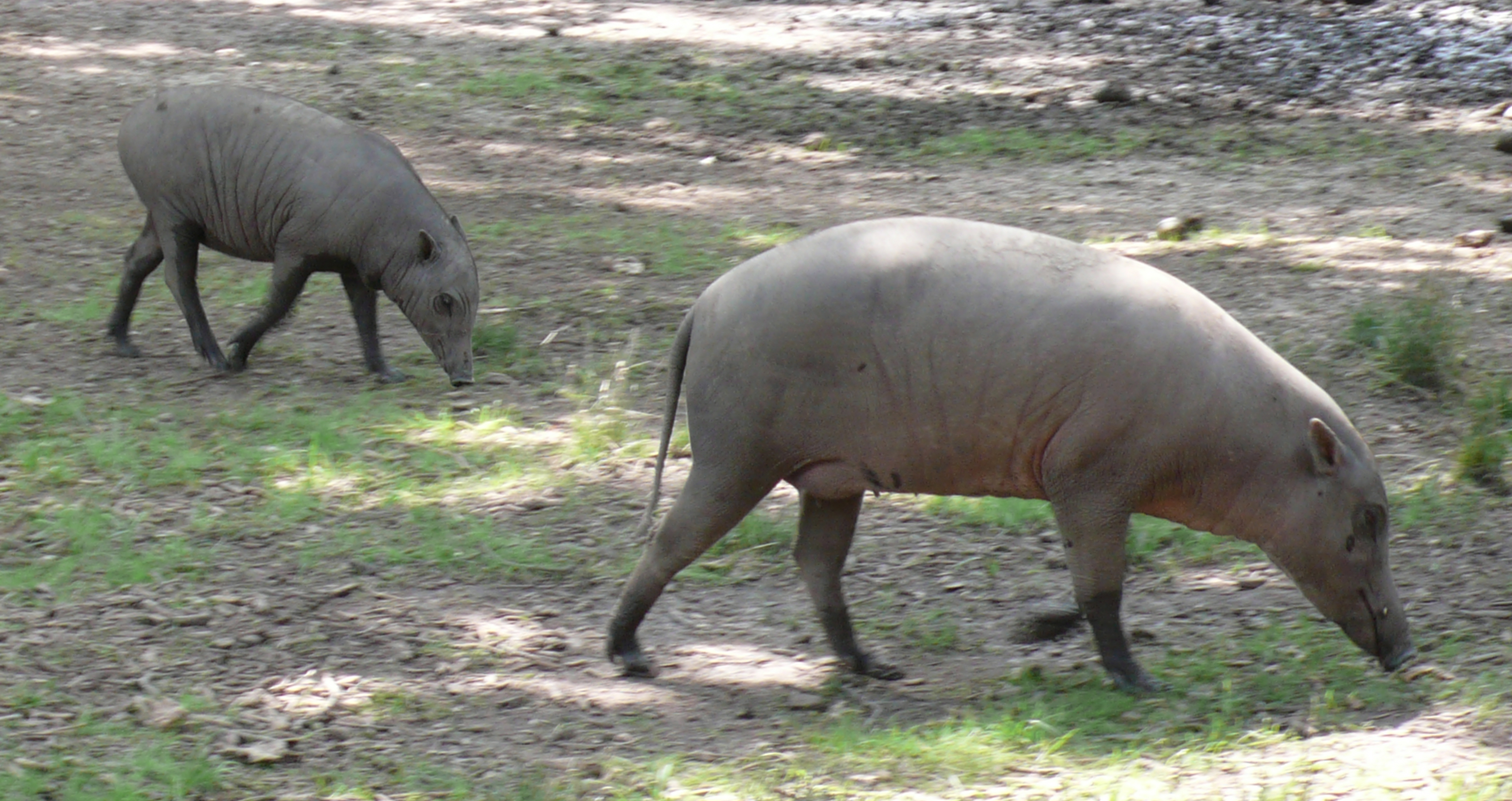
Females and young both lack obvious "tusks".

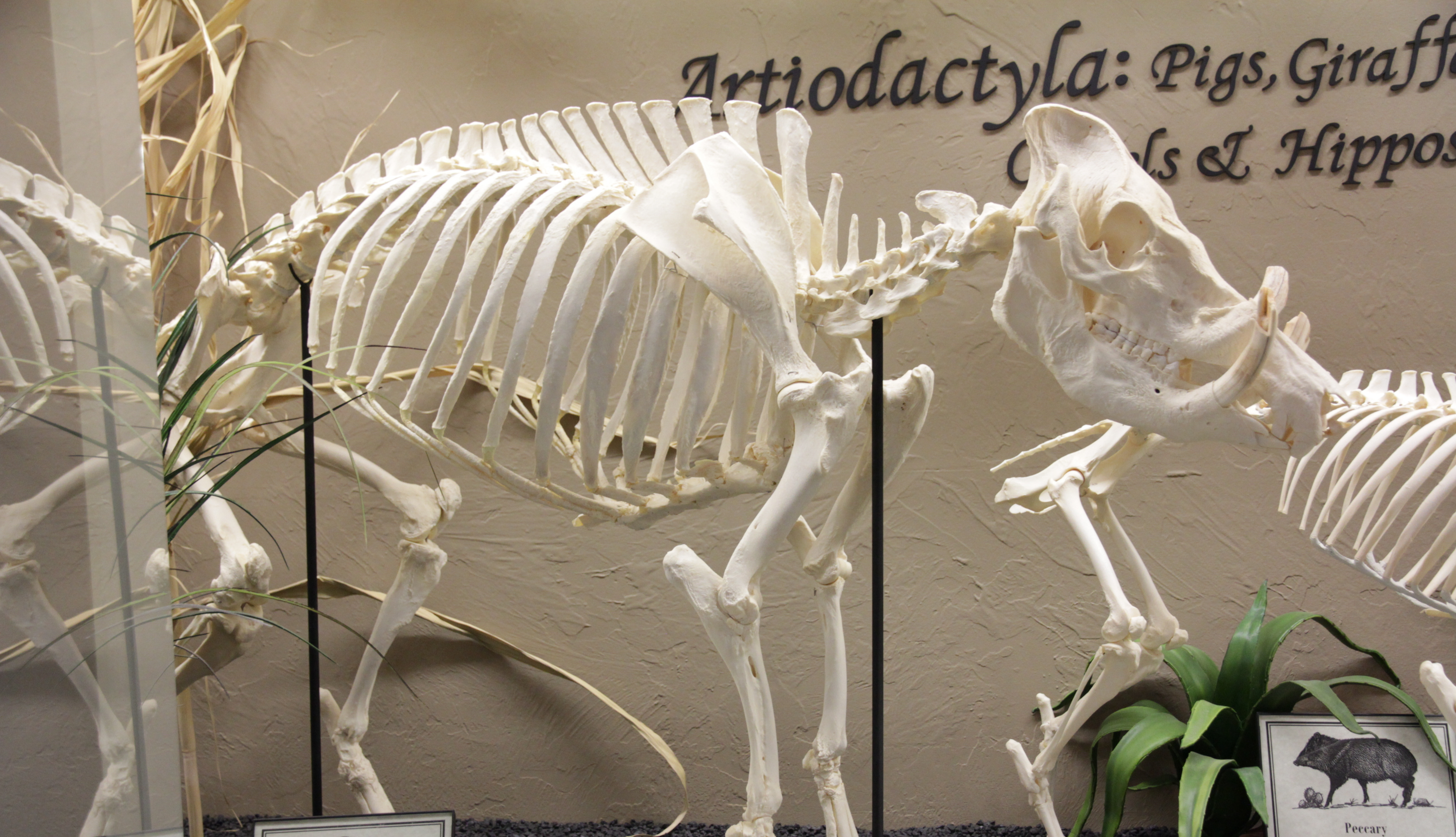
Skeleton of a North Sulawesi babirusa (Museum of Osteology)

This species is protected by Indonesian law but is threatened by illegal hunting.

== Captivity ==
A feeding male at Disney's Animal Kingdom, Florida

In captivity, the species is very inbred. The Bronx Zoo has an excellent breeding record for this animal, but it has also been bred at several other zoos such as St. Louis Zoo, Los Angeles Zoo, South Lakes Safari Zoo, Marwell Wildlife, Audubon Zoo and Chester Zoo.

In 2006, a male North Sulawesi Babirusa and a female domestic pig were accidentally allowed to interbreed in the Copenhagen Zoo. The offspring were five hybrid piglets, two of whom died from injuries received from their mother; the remaining three (two males and one female) were found to be infertile.
