= Hemichoerus =

Scientific classification
- Domain: Eukaryota
- Kingdom: Animalia
- Phylum: Chordata
- Class: Mammalia
- Order: Artiodactyla
- Family: Suidae
- Genus: †Hemichoerus; Filhol, 1882

Extinct genus of even-toed ungulates

Hemichoerus was an extinct genus of even-toed ungulates that existed during the Miocene in Europe.
