= Sinohyus =

Sinohyus Temporal range: 5.332–3.200 Ma

Scientific classification
- Domain: Eukaryota
- Kingdom: Animalia
- Phylum: Chordata
- Class: Mammalia
- Order: Artiodactyla
- Family: Suidae
- Subfamily: Suinae
- Tribe: †Hippohyini
- Genus: †Sinohyus; Koenigswald, 1963
- Species: †S. minimus

Binomial name
- †Sinohyus minimus Koenigswald, 1963

Extinct genus of mammal

Sinohyus was a genus of ground dwelling omnivorous even toed ungulates that existed in Asia during the Pliocene.

Originally classified in the genus Sus, its teeth were considered distinct enough for it to be placed in its own genus.
