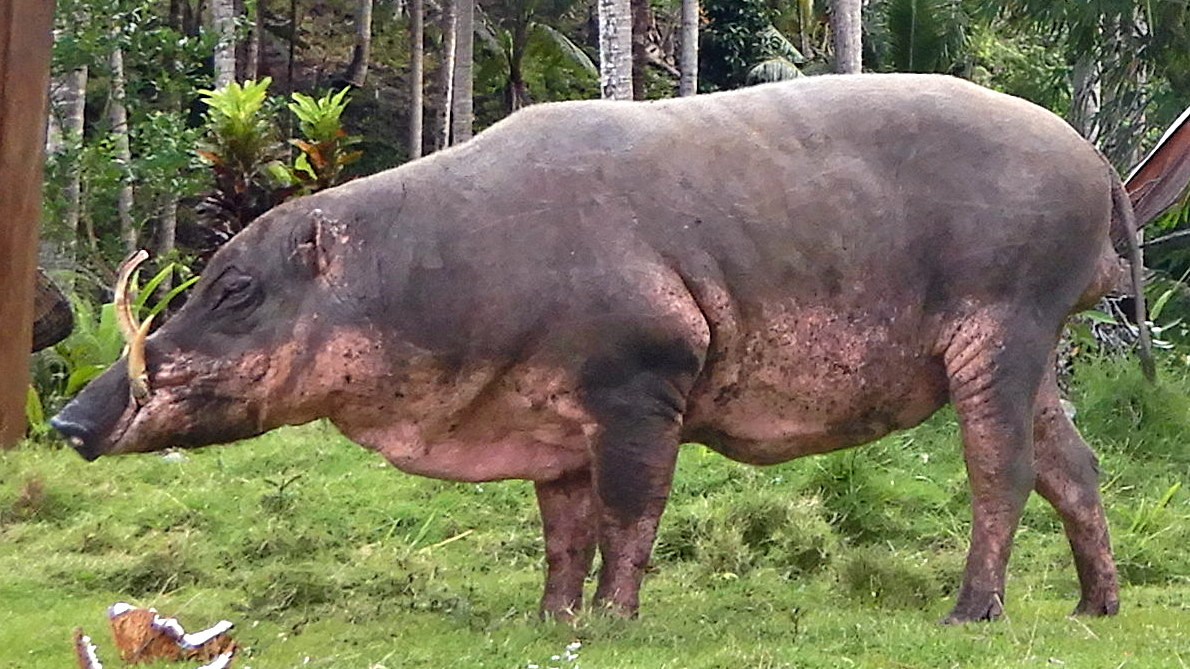

Conservation status
- Endangered (IUCN 3.1)
- CITES Appendix I

Scientific classification
- Kingdom: Animalia
- Phylum: Chordata
- Class: Mammalia
- Order: Artiodactyla
- Family: Suidae
- Genus: Babyrousa
- Species: B. togeanensis

Binomial name
- Babyrousa togeanensis (Sody, 1949)
- Range (in brown)

= Togian babirusa =

Togian Babirusa

Species of mammal

The Togian babirusa (Babyrousa togeanensis), also known as the Malenge babirusa, is the largest species of babirusa. It is endemic to the Togian Islands of Indonesia, but was considered a subspecies of Babyrousa babyrussa until 2002. Compared to the better-known north Sulawesi babirusa, the Togian babirusa is larger, has a well-developed tail-tuft, and the upper canines of the male are relatively "short, slender, rotated forwards, and always converge". The Togian babirusa is omnivorous, feeding mainly on roots and fallen fruit but also on worms and invertebrates. Unlike other pig species, the Togian babirusa does not root at the ground with its snout when foraging, but instead can be seen pawing at the ground to uproot plants.
