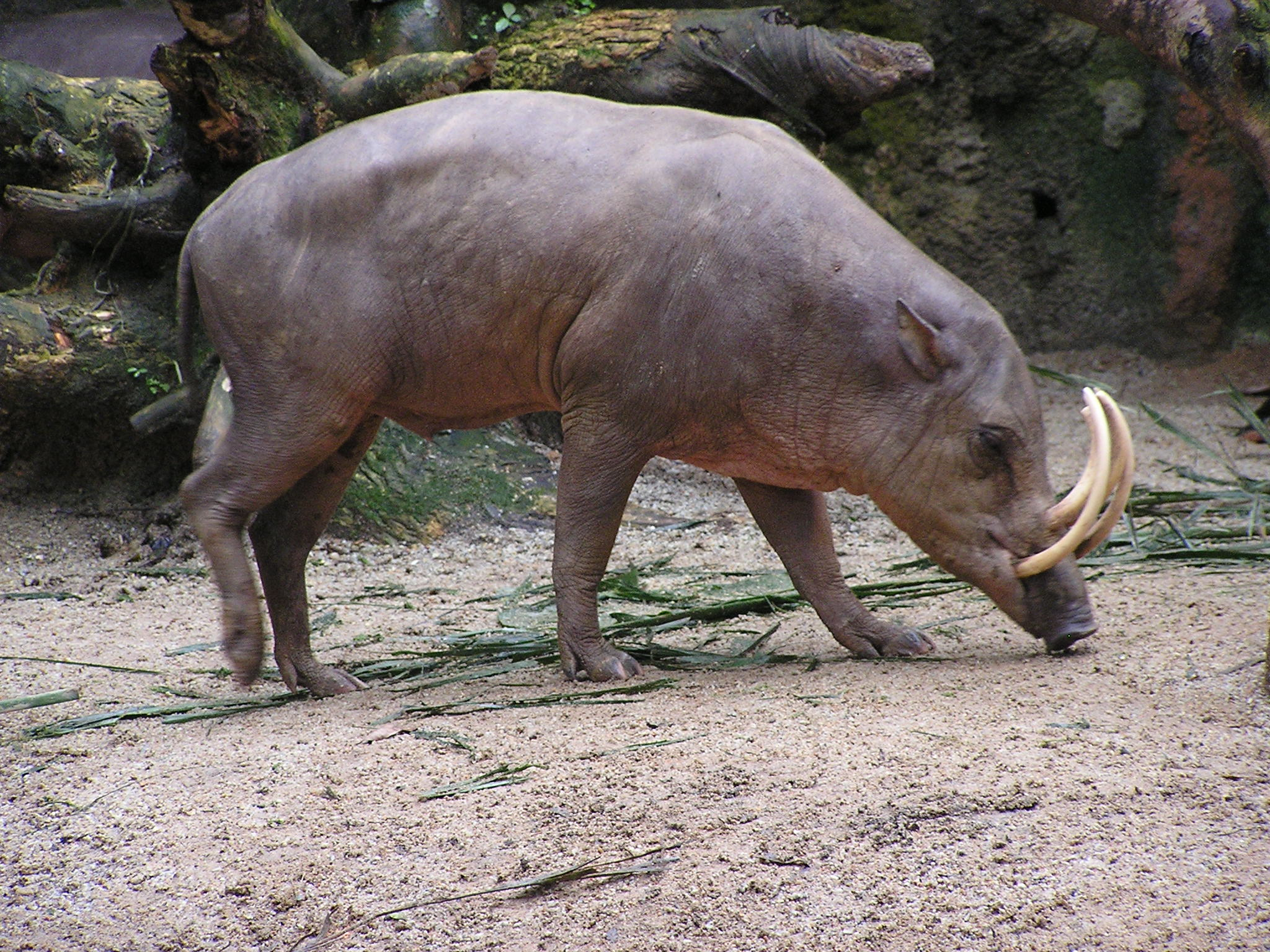
- A male North Sulawesi babirusa; only the adult males possess the distinctive tusks.

Scientific classification
- Kingdom: Animalia
- Phylum: Chordata
- Class: Mammalia
- Order: Artiodactyla
- Family: Suidae
- Subfamily: Babyrousinae; Thenius, 1970
- Genus: Babyrousa; Perry, 1811

Type species
- Babyrousa quadricornua Perry, 1811

Species
- 3–4, See text.

= Babirusa =

Genus of mammals in the swine family

Babirusas, also called deer-pigs (Malay: babi rusa), are a genus, Babyrousa, in the swine family found in the Indonesian islands of Sulawesi, Togian, Sula and Buru. Previously all members of this genus were considered part of a single species, B. babyrussa, but in 2002 they were split into several species. The Buru babirusa is now restricted to animals from Buru and Sula, whereas the best-known species, the North Sulawesi babirusa, is named B. celebensis. The males have prominent upwards incurving canine tusks, which pierce the flesh in the snout.

All species of babirusa are listed as threatened by the International Union for Conservation of Nature (IUCN).

== Description ==
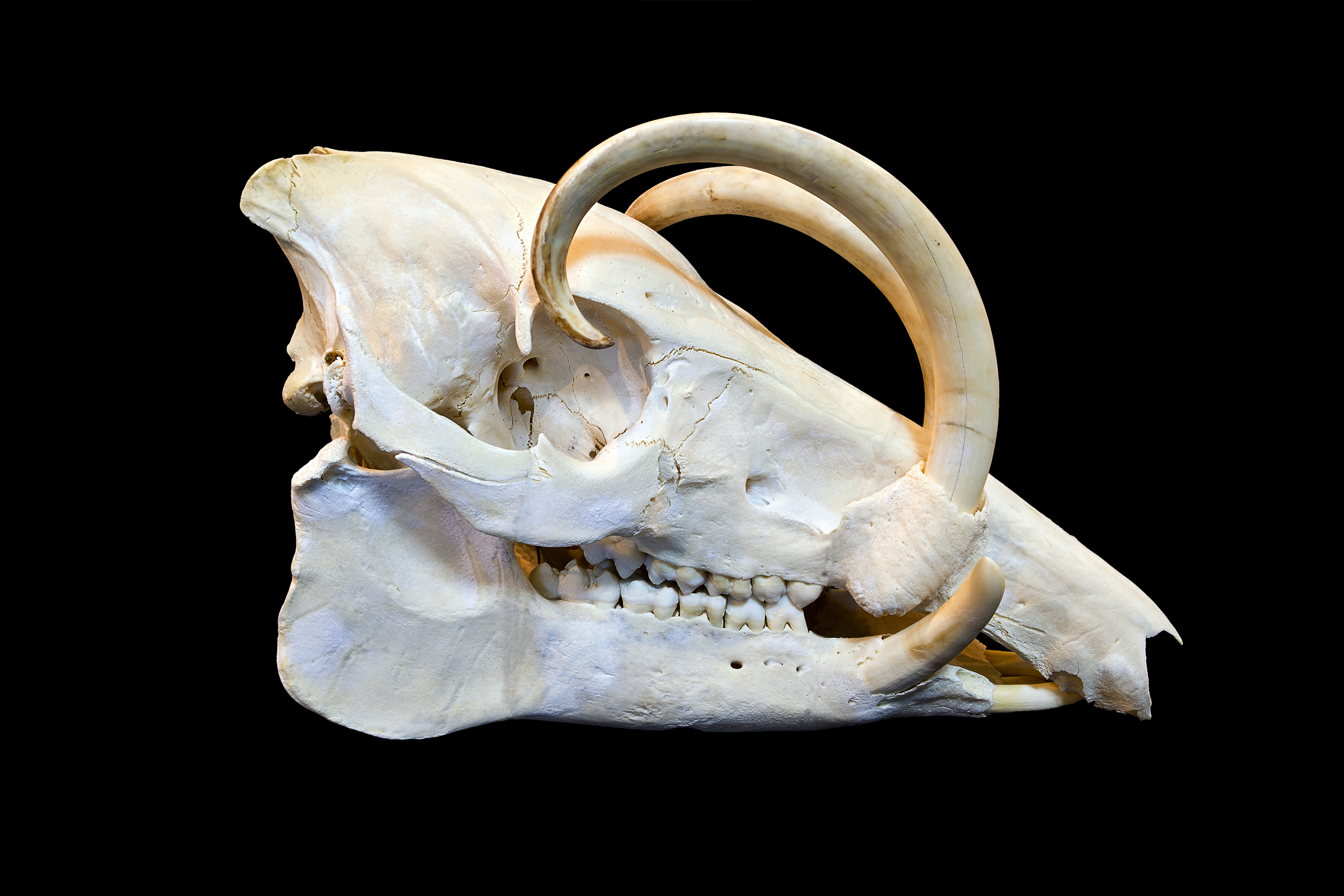
Skull of a male North Sulawesi babirusa (37 cm or 15 inches long)

Babirusas are notable for the long upper canines in the males. The upper canines of males emerge vertically from the alveolar process, penetrating through the skin and curving backward over the front of the face and towards the forehead. The lower canines also grow upwards. The canines of females are either reduced or absent. The structure of the male's canines varies by species: in the golden babirusa, the upper canines are short and slender with the alveolar rotated forward to allow the lower canines to cross the lateral view. The Togian babirusa also has the same characteristics and the upper canines always converge. The North Sulawesi babirusa has long and thick upper canines with a vertically implanted alveolar. This causes the upper canines to emerge vertically and not cross with the lower canines.

Babirusas also vary by species in other characteristics. The golden babirusa has a long, thick pelage that is white, creamy gold, black or gold overall, and black at the rump. The pelage of the Togian babirusa is also long but not as that of the golden babirusa. The Togian babirusa has a tawny, brown, or black pelage that is darker on the upper parts than in the lower parts. The North Sulawesi babirusa has very short hair and appears bald. The female babirusa has only one pair of teats.

== Classification ==
The genus is monotypic within the subfamily Babyrousinae, or alternatively considered to form a tribe, Babyrousini of the subfamily Suinae. To date, only one fossil skull has been found to suggest a larger ancestor.

All members of the genus were historically considered part of a single species, B. babyrussa. After they were split into several species, this scientific name is restricted to the Buru babirusa from Buru and the Sula Islands, whereas the best-known species, the north Sulawesi babirusa, is named B. celebensis. The split, which uses the phylogenetic species concept, is also based on morphological characters, such as differences in size, amount of hair on the body and tail-tuft, and measurements of the skull and teeth.

=== Species ===
Image	Name	Distribution
	Buru babirusa (B. babyrussa), also known as the hairy or golden babirusa	Buru, Sula Islands of Mangole and Taliabu
	Bola Batu babirusa (B. bolabatuensis)	Sulawesi
	North Sulawesi babirusa (B. celebensis), also known as the Sulawesi babirusa	Sulawesi
	Togian babirusa (B. togeanensis)	Togian Islands

B. babyrussa beruensis was described as an extinct, Pleistocene subspecies from southwestern Sulawesi before babirusas were split into multiple species.

== Biology and ecology ==
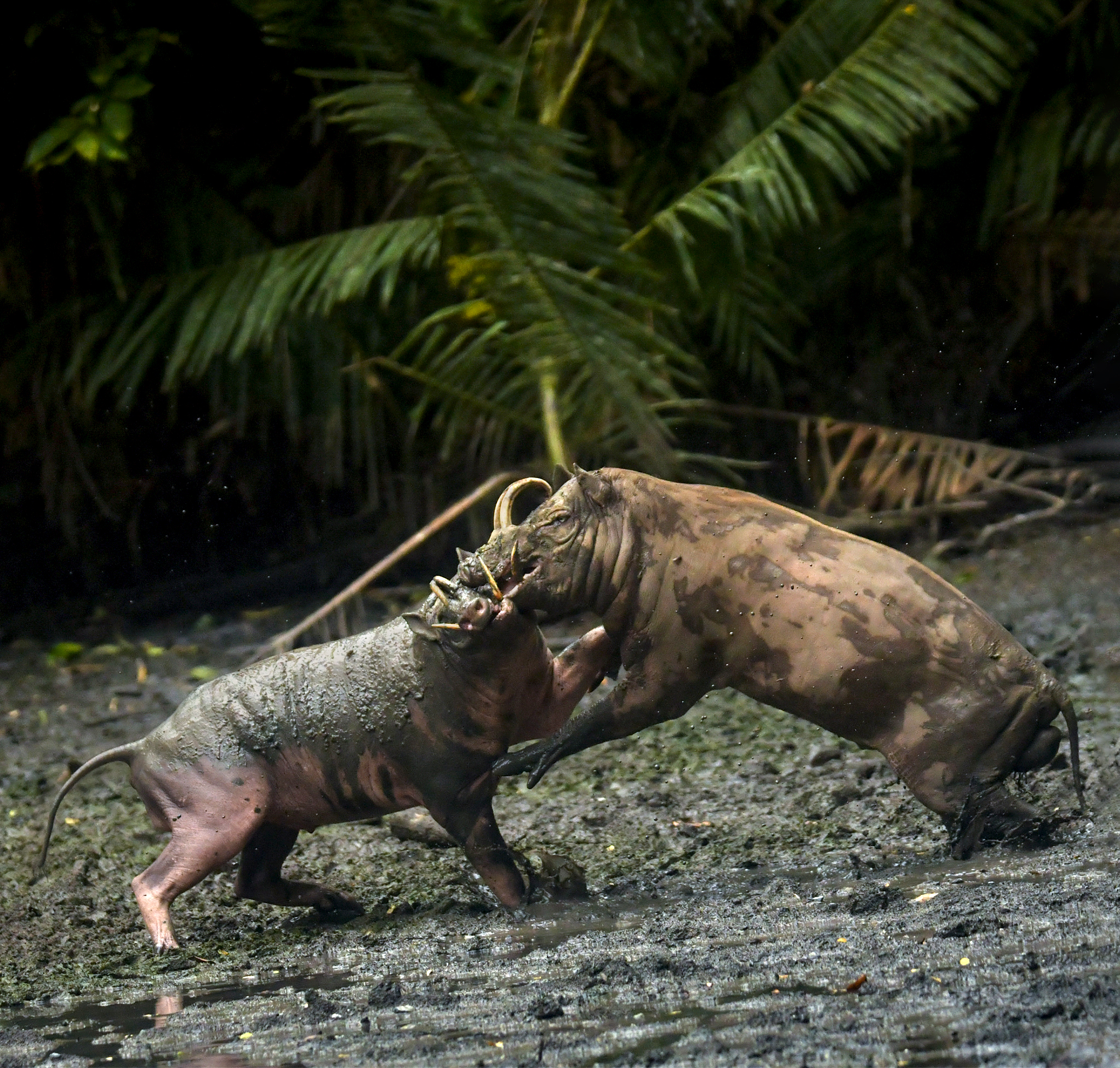
Two wild babirusas fighting

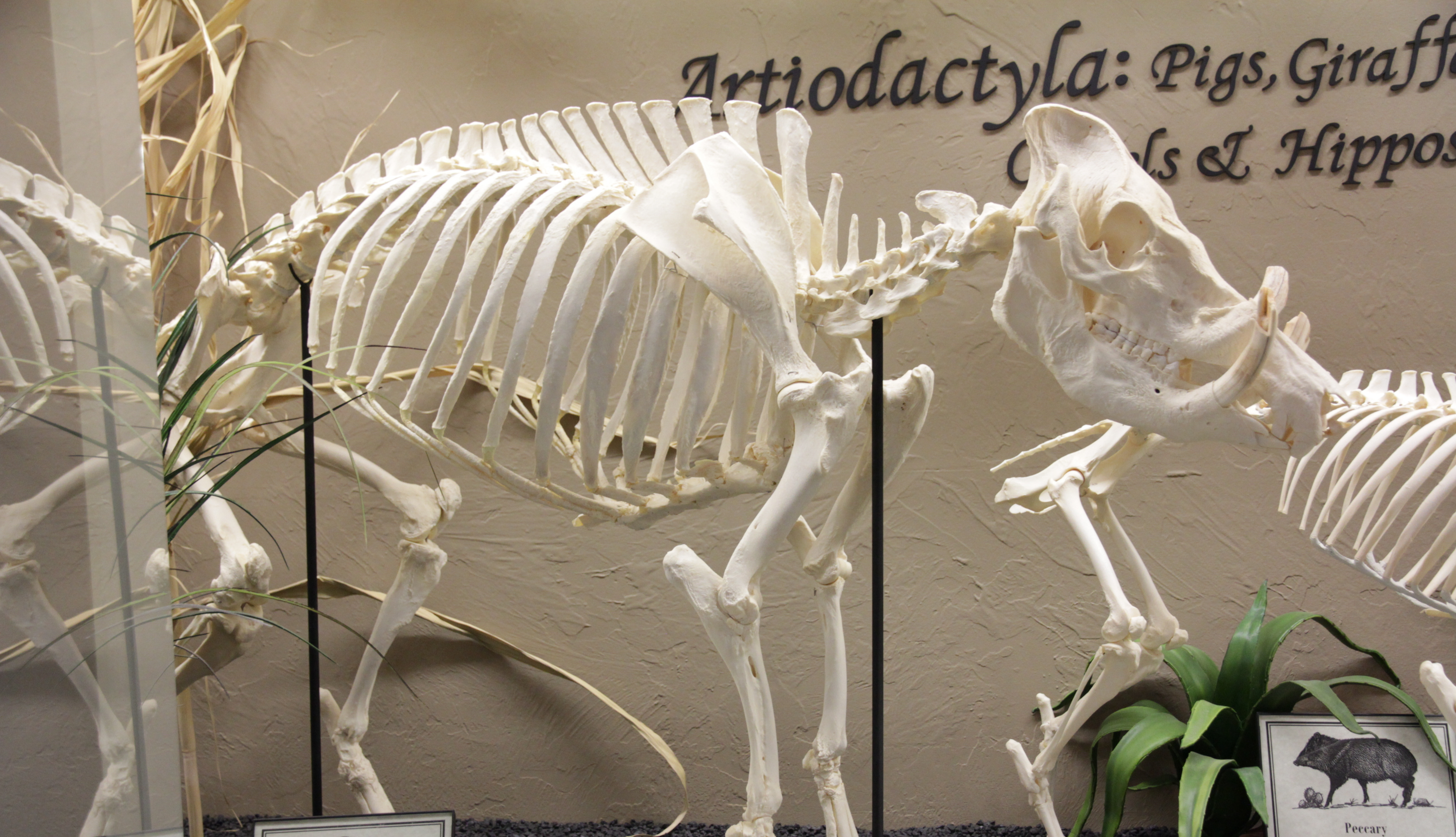
North Sulawesi babirusa skeleton (Museum of Osteology)

Babirusas are native to Sulawesi, some of the Togian Islands, the Sula Islands, and Buru. In Sulawesi, they range from the Minahasa Peninsula to the provinces of South Sulawesi and Southeast Sulawesi. Although they are present on both Sulawesi and Sula, they are not found on the large islands between the two, the Banggai Archipelago. It has been hypothesized that the unusual distribution may be due to their being transported by humans as gifts bestowed by native royalty. The preferred habitat of babirusa is tropical rainforest along river banks. It appears that they have been confined to the higher grounds in the interior despite occurring in lowland areas near coasts in the past. They are active during the daytime. Like all pig species, babirusa has an omnivorous diet with an intestinal tract similar to that of the domestic pig. The stomach diverticulum of a babirusa is enlarged which may indicate that it is a ruminant but evidence shows otherwise. Because it does not have a rostral bone in the nose, a babirusa does not dig with its snout like other pigs do except in mud and swampy grounds. The diet of the babirusa includes leaves, roots, fruits and animal material. The strong jaws of a babirusa are capable of easily cracking hard nuts.

Males tend to live solitarily while adult females can be found in groups with young. Groups of females and young may number up to 84 individuals, most of which contain no adult males. Males rarely travel in pairs or trios. There are almost never more than three adult females in a group. The tusks of the adult males are used in intraspecific fighting. The upper tusks are for defense while the lower tusks are offensive weapons. If a male babirusa does not grind his tusks (achievable through regular activity), they can eventually keep growing and, rarely, penetrate the individual's skull.

Female babirusa cycle lengths are between 28 and 42 days and estrus last 2–3 days. The litter size for a babirusa is usually one or two piglets.

== Relationship with humans ==
In Indonesia, the striking appearance of the babirusa has inspired demonic masks.

The Balinese Hindu-era Court of Justice pavilion and the "floating pavilion" of Klungkung palace ruins are notable for painted babirusa raksasa (grotesques) on the ceilings.

Prehistoric paintings of babirusa found in caves on the island of Sulawesi in Indonesia have been dated back at least 35,400 years (to the ice age Pleistocene epoch). Adam Brumm, who co-authored the 2014 study dating the paintings, said "The paintings of the wild animals are most fascinating because it is clear they were of particular interest to the artists themselves."

The babirusa has sparked debate among Jewish scholars and animal researchers about whether it is considered kosher, or permissible to be consumed by Jews, according to Jewish dietary laws. The debate centers around whether the animal chews its cud, which is a requirement according to the Old Testament for an animal to be considered kosher. Some experts, like J. David Bleich, a professor of Jewish law and ethics at Yeshiva University, believe that the babirusa does not meet the physical criteria to be considered kosher, challenging the assertion that the babirusa chews its cud by citing a report from 1940 that found that true rumination could not take place in the animal's stomach. However, he also notes that Jews can eat any food that is not expressly forbidden and that "the babirusa's resemblance to a pig in appearance and taste is not sufficient grounds for banning its consumption as kosher meat." Others, such as Fuller Bazer, an animal science professor at the University of Florida, believe that the animal is kosher due to its cloven hoof and cud chewing. Additionally, it has been noted that the babirusa is an endangered species and that most Muslims, who face similar dietary restrictions, would avoid eating the meat of any animal whose status in religious law is uncertain (shubhah).

== Conservation status ==
Babirusas are protected in Indonesia and killing them is illegal in most cases. However, poaching remains a significant threat to the babirusa. Additionally, commercial logging operations threaten the babirusa by habitat loss, and also reduce cover, making the babirusa more exposed to poachers. All extant species of babirusa are listed as vulnerable or endangered by the IUCN.
