= Spelaeomys =

Spelaeomys Temporal range: Late Pleistocene–Holocene

Conservation status
- Extinct (IUCN 2.3)

Scientific classification
- Kingdom: Animalia
- Phylum: Chordata
- Class: Mammalia
- Order: Rodentia
- Family: Muridae
- Subfamily: Murinae
- Genus: †Spelaeomys; Hooijer, 1957
- Species: †S. florensis

Binomial name
- †Spelaeomys florensis Hooijer, 1957

Extinct species of rodent

Spelaeomys florensis, also known as the Flores cave rat, is an extinct species of rat that was formerly endemic to the island of Flores, Indonesia. MacPhee and Flemming assessed this species to be extinct in 1996, but believed it probably died out before 1500. This specimen is only known from subfossil remains, including at Liang Bua cave. It is the only member of the genus Spelaeomys. It was large sized species with a body mass of around 0.6–1.6 kilograms (1.3–3.5 lb). It is suggested to have been arboreal animal that lived in closed forests, and to have been herbivorous, consuming leaves and flowers.
