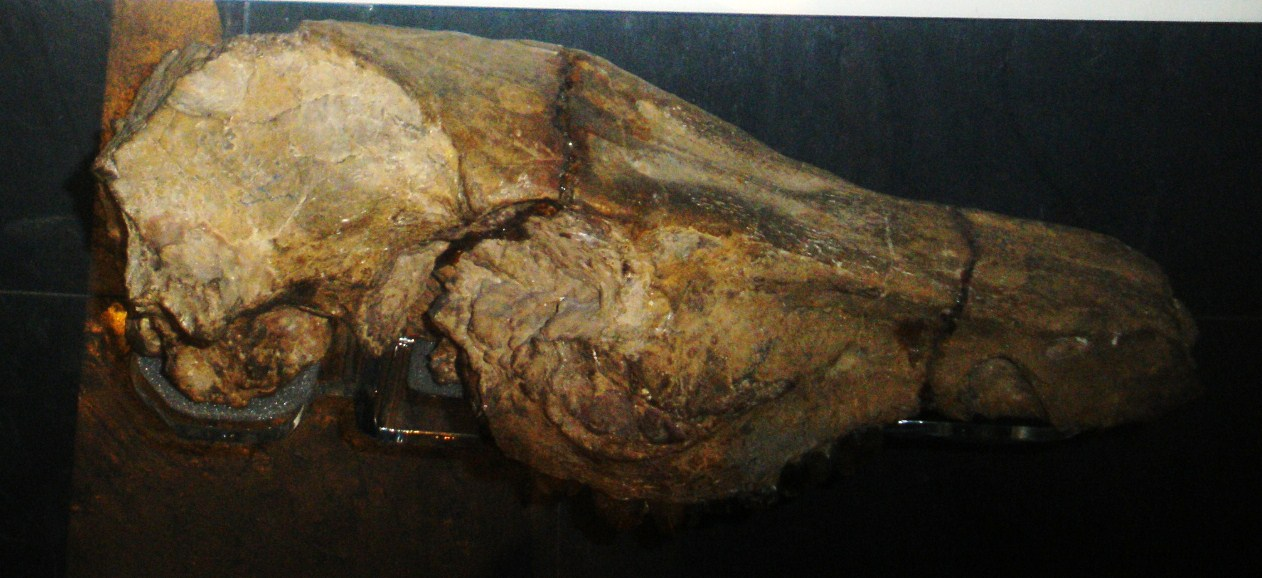
- A Hippohyus sivalensis skull

Scientific classification
- Kingdom: Animalia
- Phylum: Chordata
- Class: Mammalia
- Order: Artiodactyla
- Family: Suidae
- Subfamily: Suinae
- Tribe: †Hippohyini
- Genus: †Hippohyus; Falconer & Cautley, 1847

Type species
- †Hippohyus sivalensis

Species
- H. detterai; H. sivalensis

= Hippohyus =

Hippohyus Temporal range: 5.332–2.588 Ma

Extinct genus of mammal

Hippohyus is an extinct genus of pig-like animals that lived during the Pliocene in India.

== Description ==
Hippohyus had high-crowned molars with wrinkled enamel. The posterior premolars were enlarged and short. The skull was primitive, with a flat forehead, enlarged nasal bones, a relatively central orbital cavity and a rather robust zygomatic arch, with the jugal root originating at the height of the fourth premolar.

The most unusual dental characteristic of Hippohyus was the extraordinary folding of the cones and conules in its teeth. Its dental wear was more similar a horse than a typical pig.
