= Sinapriculus =

Scientific classification
- Kingdom: Animalia
- Phylum: Chordata
- Class: Mammalia
- Order: Artiodactyla
- Family: Suidae
- Genus: †Sinapriculus; Liu, Fortelius & Pickford, 2002

Extinct genus of mammals

Sinapriculus was an extinct genus of even-toed ungulates that existed in China during the Miocene.
