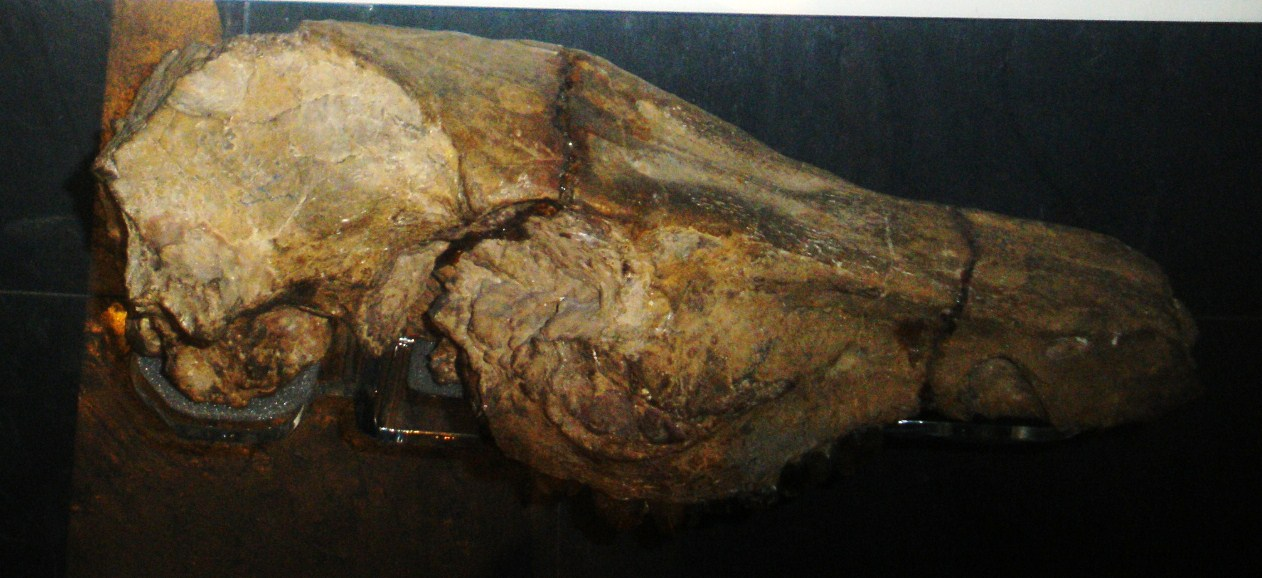
- A Hippohyus sivalensis skull

Scientific classification
- Domain: Eukaryota
- Kingdom: Animalia
- Phylum: Chordata
- Class: Mammalia
- Order: Artiodactyla
- Family: Suidae
- Subfamily: Suinae
- Tribe: †Hippohyini; Thenius, 1970

= Hippohyini =

Hippohyini Temporal range: 5.332–2.588 Ma

Extinct tribe of mammals

Hippohyini was an extinct tribe of Suinae which existed in Asia during the Pliocene.

== Genera ==
Hippohyini has three genera;

- †Hippohyus Falconer & Cautley, 1847 - Pliocene
- †Sinohyus von Koenigswald, 1963 - Pliocene
- †Sivahyus Pilgrim, 1926 - Pliocene
