= Palaeochoerus =

Palaeochoerus Temporal range: 28.4–7.246 Ma

Scientific classification
- Kingdom: Animalia
- Phylum: Chordata
- Class: Mammalia
- Order: Artiodactyla
- Family: Suidae
- Genus: †Palaeochoerus; Leidy, 1856

Extinct genus of mammals

Palaeochoerus was an extinct genus of even-toed ungulates that existed throughout Africa during the Oligocene, and throughout Eurasia during the Miocene.
