= Sivahyus =

Sivahyus Temporal range: 5.332–2.588 Ma

Scientific classification
- Kingdom: Animalia
- Phylum: Chordata
- Class: Mammalia
- Order: Artiodactyla
- Family: Suidae
- Subfamily: Suinae
- Tribe: †Hippohyini
- Genus: †Sivahyus; Pilgrim, 1926

Extinct genus of mammals

Sivahyus was a genus of ground dwelling omnivorous even toed ungulates that existed in Asia during the Pliocene.

== Species ==
- Sivahyus punjabiensis
