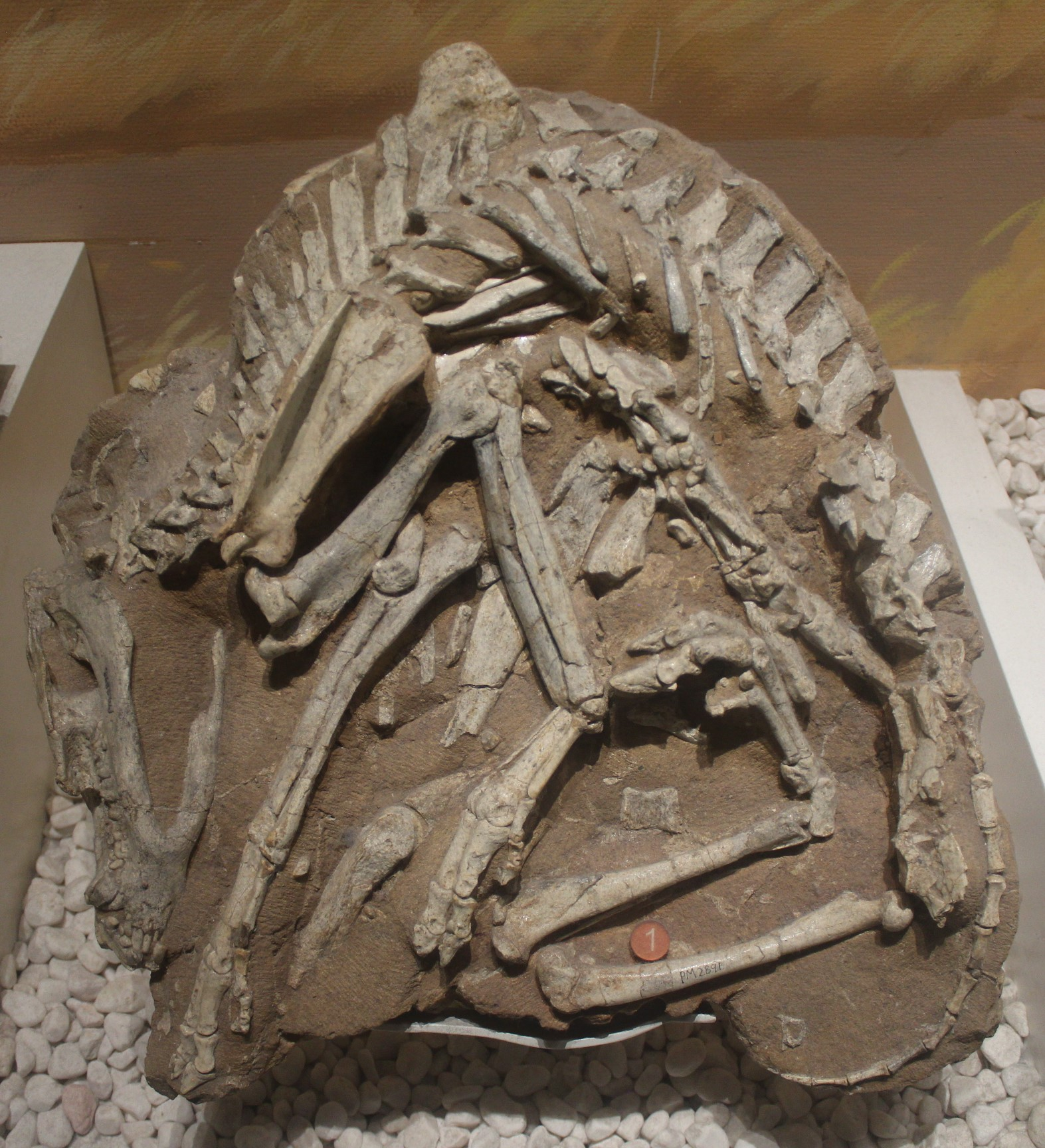
- Skeleton on display at the National Natural History Museum of China

Scientific classification
- Domain: Eukaryota
- Kingdom: Animalia
- Phylum: Chordata
- Class: Mammalia
- Order: Artiodactyla
- Family: Suidae
- Subfamily: †Hyotheriinae
- Genus: †Chleuastochoerus; Pearson, 1928

Species
- C. stehlini Schlosser, 1903; C. tuvensis Vislobokova, 2009

= Chleuastochoerus =

Extinct genus of mammals

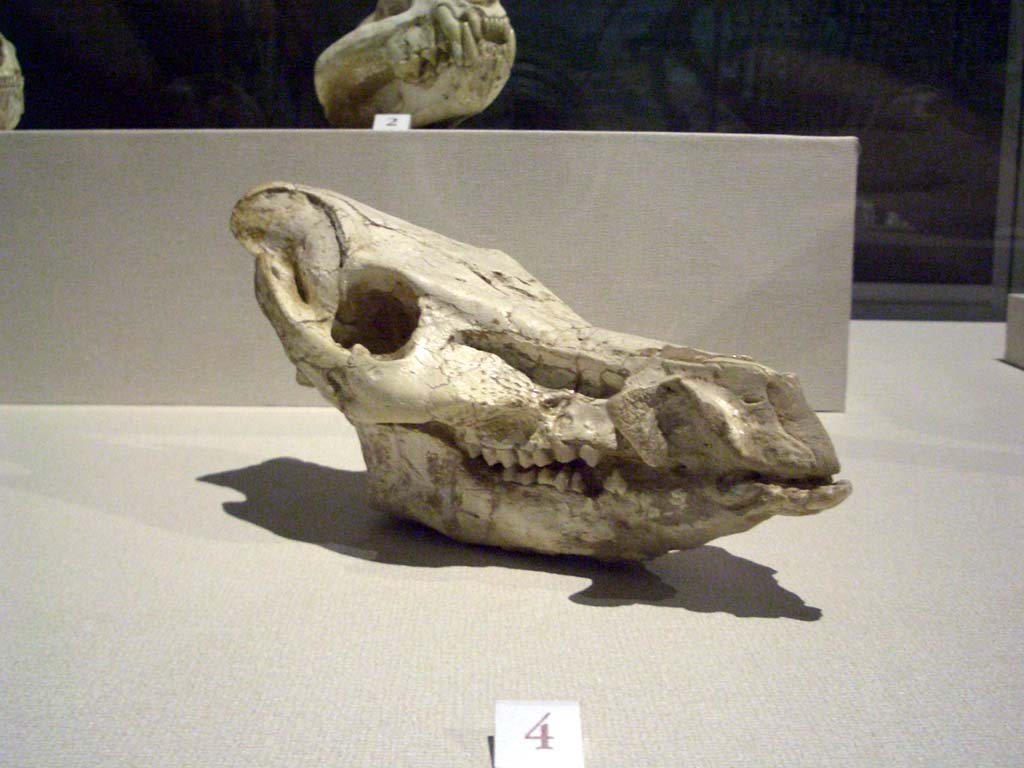
Skull, Hong Kong Science Museum

Chleuastochoerus is an extinct genus in the pig family that lived in the Miocene and Pliocene in Russia and Eastern Asia.
