= Shubha (Arabic) =

Shubha (Arabic: شبهة doubt, obscurity, or mis-grounded conceit) is an Islamic term referring to the duty of leaders/judges to consider any doubt (shubha) before implementing a verdict in a criminal case of any degree. Muhammad said not to implement serious punishment in cases of uncertainty, with the phrase: "ادرؤوا الحدود بالشبهات" ("seek doubts to avoid punishment").

== In Qur'an ==
A derived term with similar meaning is mentioned in the Qur'an at 3:7.

It is He Who has sent down to you the Book. In it are Verses that are entirely clear, they are the foundations of the Book; and others not entirely clear. So as for those in whose hearts there is a deviation (from the truth) they follow that which is not entirely clear thereof, seeking Al-Fitnah (polytheism and trials, etc.), and seeking for its hidden meanings, but none knows its hidden meanings save Allâh. And those who are firmly grounded in knowledge say: "We believe in it; the whole of it (clear and unclear Verses) are from our Lord." And none receive admonition except men of understanding.

== In Hadith ==
Muhammad is reported to have commented on the above verse:

«فَإِذَا رَأَيْتِ الَّذِينَ يَتَّبِعُونَ مَا تَشَابَهَ مِنْهُ؛ فَأُولئِكَ الَّذِينَ سَمَّى اللهُ، فَاحْذَرُوهُم»

(When you see those who follow what is not so clear of the Qur'an, then they are those whom God described, so beware of them.)
