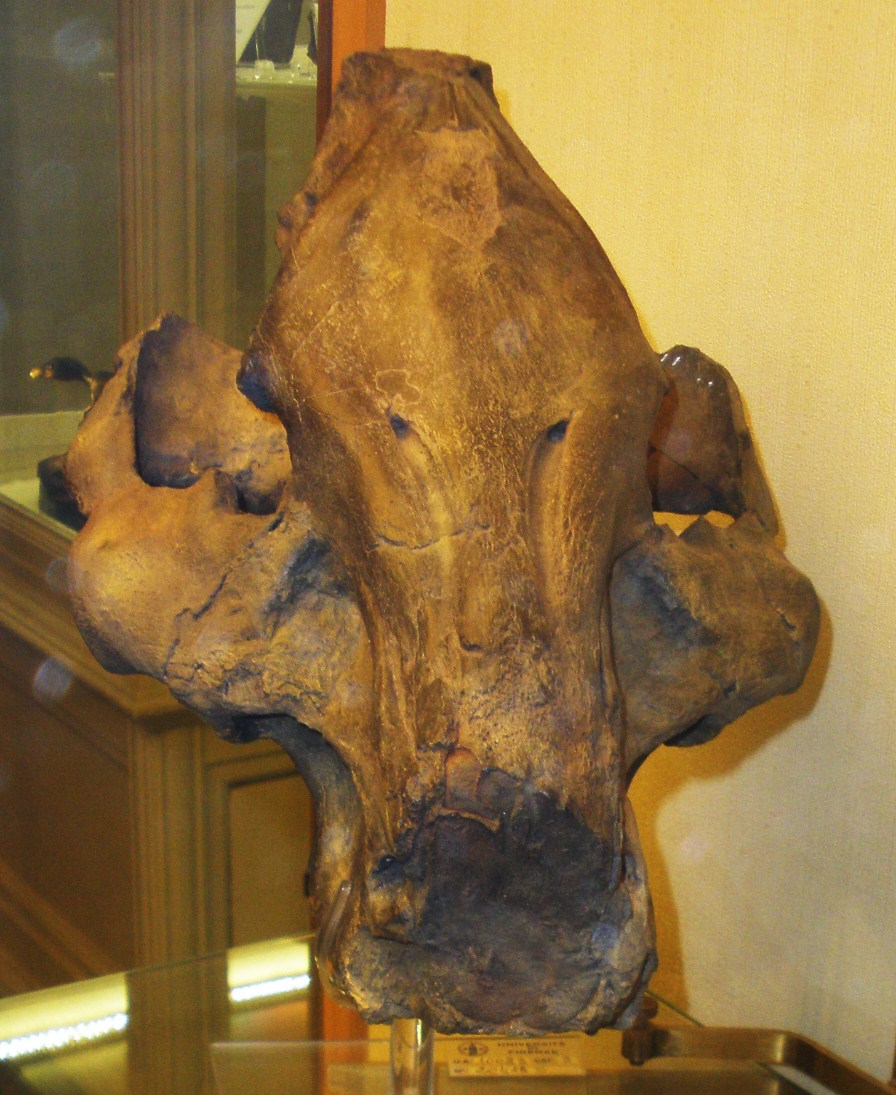
- Propotamochoerus giganteus skull

Scientific classification
- Kingdom: Animalia
- Phylum: Chordata
- Class: Mammalia
- Order: Artiodactyla
- Family: Suidae
- Subfamily: Suinae
- Genus: †Propotamochoerus; Pilgrim 1925

Species
- P. aegaeus Lazaridis, Tsoukala & Kostopoulos, 2022; P. devauxi; P. hysudricus

= Propotamochoerus =

Propotamochoerus Temporal range: Miocene to Pliocene 11.608-3.6 mya

Extinct genus of mammals

Propotamochoerus is an extinct genus of pig-like animals that lived from the Miocene to the Pliocene of Algeria, India, Moldova, China, Russia, Ukraine, Georgia, Greece, Hungary, Myanmar, Thailand, Tunisia and Pakistan.

== Description ==
In P. hysudricus, the second incisor was smaller than the first incisor. The premolars and molars are moderately elongated with modestly thick enamel. Both the talon and talonid of the maxillary and mandibular third molars respectively are relatively undifferentiated and basal.

== Palaeobiology ==
=== Palaeoecology ===
P. palaeochoerus most likely preferred to inhabit woodland environments. Also, P. palaeochoerus is known to have fed preferentially on underground roots rich in strontium according to Sr/Ca analysis.
