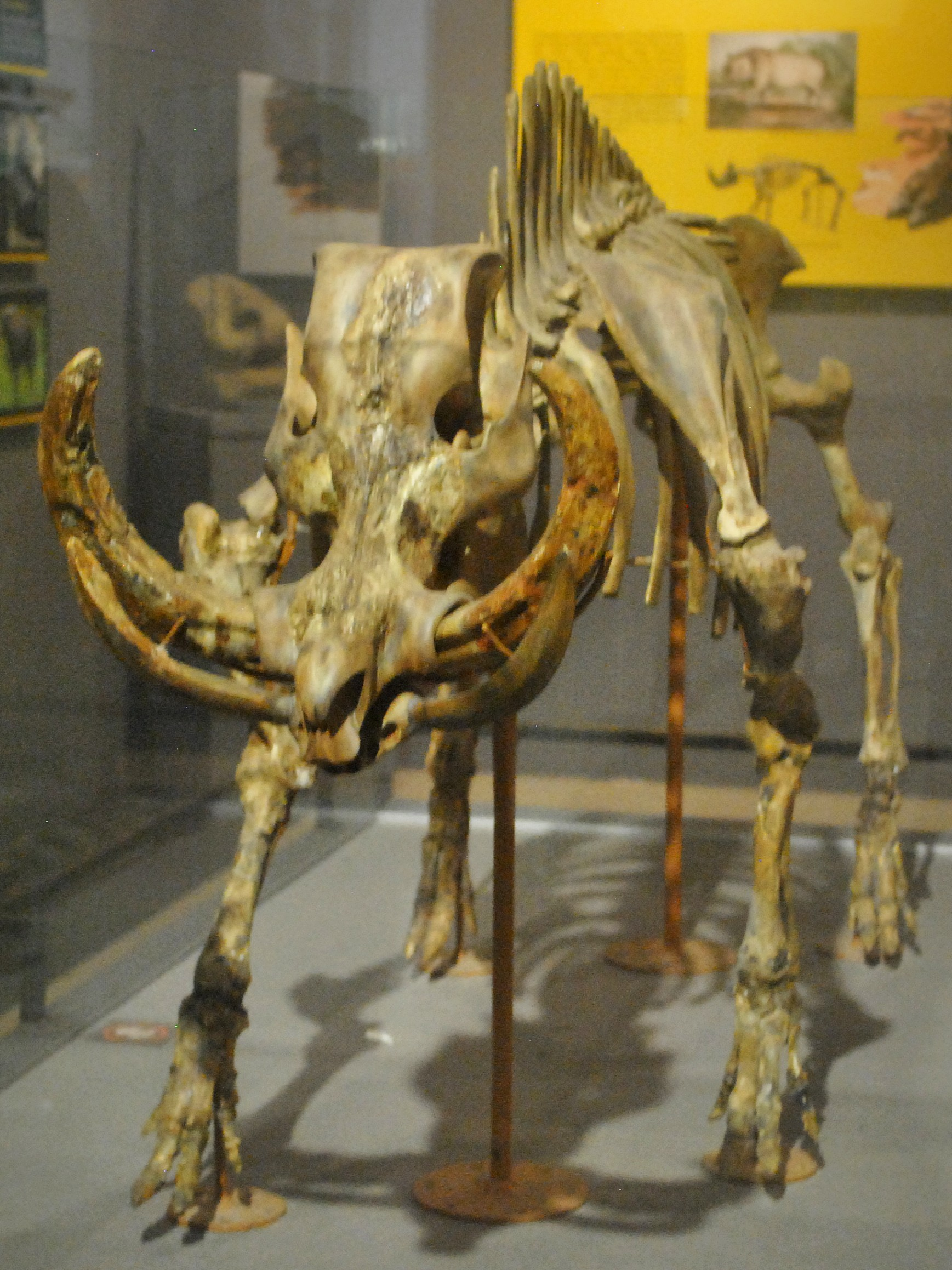
- C. heekereni at the Bandung Geological Museum

Scientific classification
- Kingdom: Animalia
- Phylum: Chordata
- Class: Mammalia
- Order: Artiodactyla
- Family: Suidae
- Genus: †Celebochoerus; Hooijer, 1948

Type species
- †Celebochoerus heekereni

Species
- C. cagayanensis; C. heekereni

= Celebochoerus =

Celebochoerus Temporal range: 2.588–0.781 Ma

Genus of giant pig

Celebochoerus is an extinct genus of giant suid that existed during the Pliocene and Pleistocene in Sulawesi, Indonesia (Celebochoerus heekereni), and the middle Pleistocene of Luzon, in the Philippines (Celebochoerus cagayanensis).

It is not thought to be closely related to Babyrousa, and seems to be quite distinct from any other known suid.

It has been suggested that its extinction is correlated with the geographical expansion of anoa, babirusa and Celebes warty pig ranges.
