= Stylochoerus =

Stylochoerus Temporal range: 2.588–1.806 Ma

Scientific classification
- Domain: Eukaryota
- Kingdom: Animalia
- Phylum: Chordata
- Class: Mammalia
- Order: Artiodactyla
- Family: Suidae
- Genus: †Stylochoerus; Carroll, 1988

Extinct genus of even-toed ungulates

Stylochoerus is an extinct genus of suid that existed during the Pleistocene in Ethiopia.
