= Xenohyus =

Xenohyus Temporal range: 20.43–15.97 Ma

Scientific classification
- Kingdom: Animalia
- Phylum: Chordata
- Class: Mammalia
- Order: Artiodactyla
- Family: Suidae
- Genus: †Xenohyus; Ginsburg, 1980
- Species: †X. venitor

Binomial name
- †Xenohyus venitor Ginsburg, 1980

Extinct genus of mammals

Xenohyus was an extinct genus of suids that existed during the Miocene in Europe.

It showed many similarities to peccaries rather than modern pigs.
