= Korynochoerus =

Korynochoerus Temporal range: 8.7–7.246 Ma

Scientific classification
- Domain: Eukaryota
- Kingdom: Animalia
- Phylum: Chordata
- Class: Mammalia
- Order: Artiodactyla
- Family: Suidae
- Genus: †Korynochoerus; Schmidt-Kittler 1971

Extinct genus of even-toed ungulates

Korynochoerus is an extinct genus of even-toed ungulates that existed during the Miocene in Europe and Asia Minor.
