= Paradiceros =

Paradiceros Temporal range: Middle to Late Miocene 13.7–9 Ma

Scientific classification
- Kingdom: Animalia
- Phylum: Chordata
- Class: Mammalia
- Order: Perissodactyla
- Family: Rhinocerotidae
- Genus: †Paradiceros; Hooijer, 1968
- Species: †P. mukirii

Binomial name
- †Paradiceros mukirii Hooijer, 1968

Extinct genus of rhinoceros

Paradiceros is an extinct genus of rhinocerotid that lived in east Africa during the Late Miocene, between 13.7 and 9 million years ago.

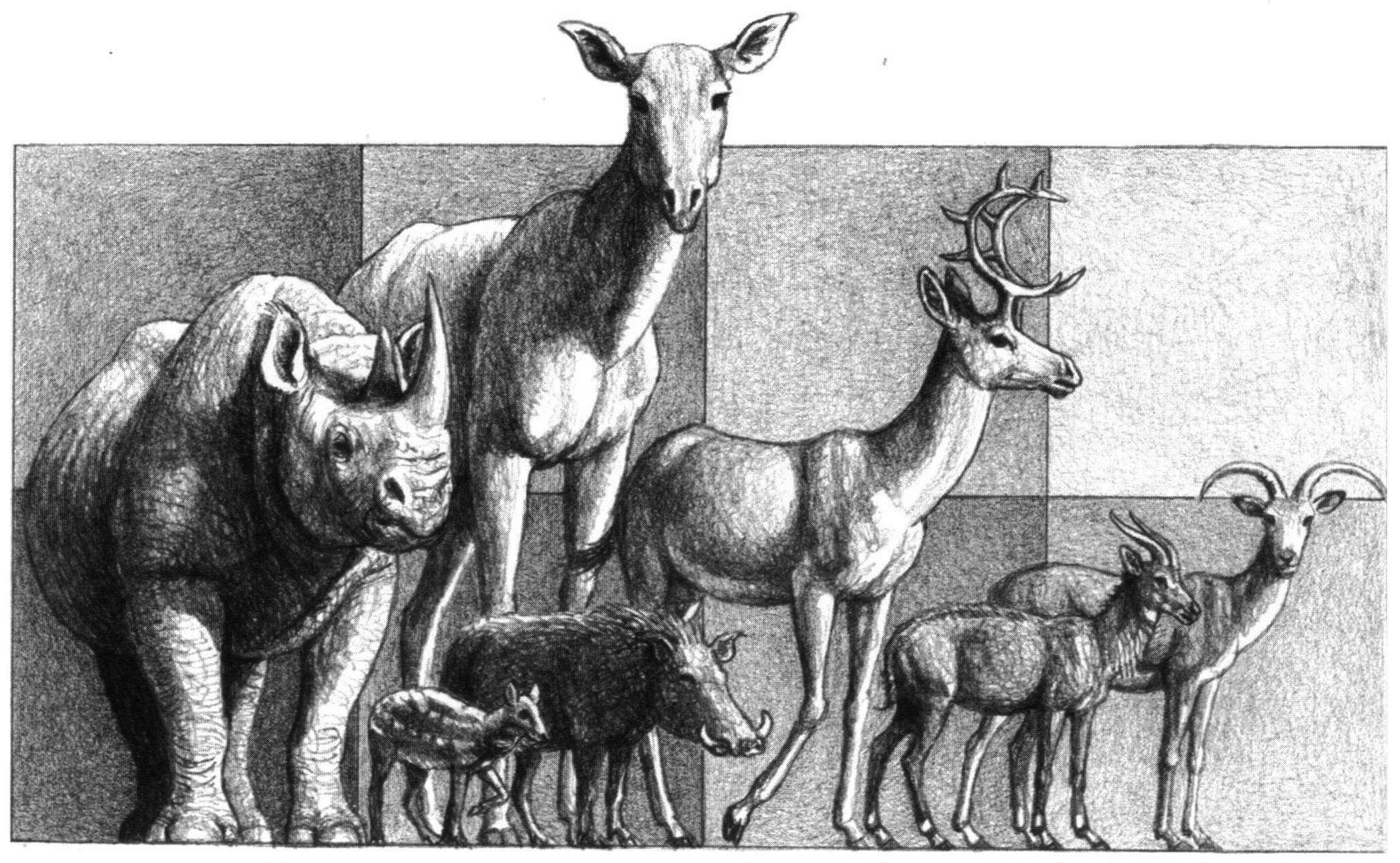
Eastern African mid-Miocene ungulates, including Paradiceros (left)

Paradiceros was a relatively small species once believed to be closely allied to Diceros. It was a browser and had very short legs, though not as short as some of the more primitive species like Chilotherium.
