= Potamochoeroides =

Potamochoeroides Temporal range: 3.6–2.588 Ma

Scientific classification
- Domain: Eukaryota
- Kingdom: Animalia
- Phylum: Chordata
- Class: Mammalia
- Order: Artiodactyla
- Family: Suidae
- Genus: †Potamochoeroides; Dale 1948

Extinct genus of even-toed ungulates

Potamochoeroides was an extinct genus of even-toed ungulates that existed during the Pliocene in South Africa.
