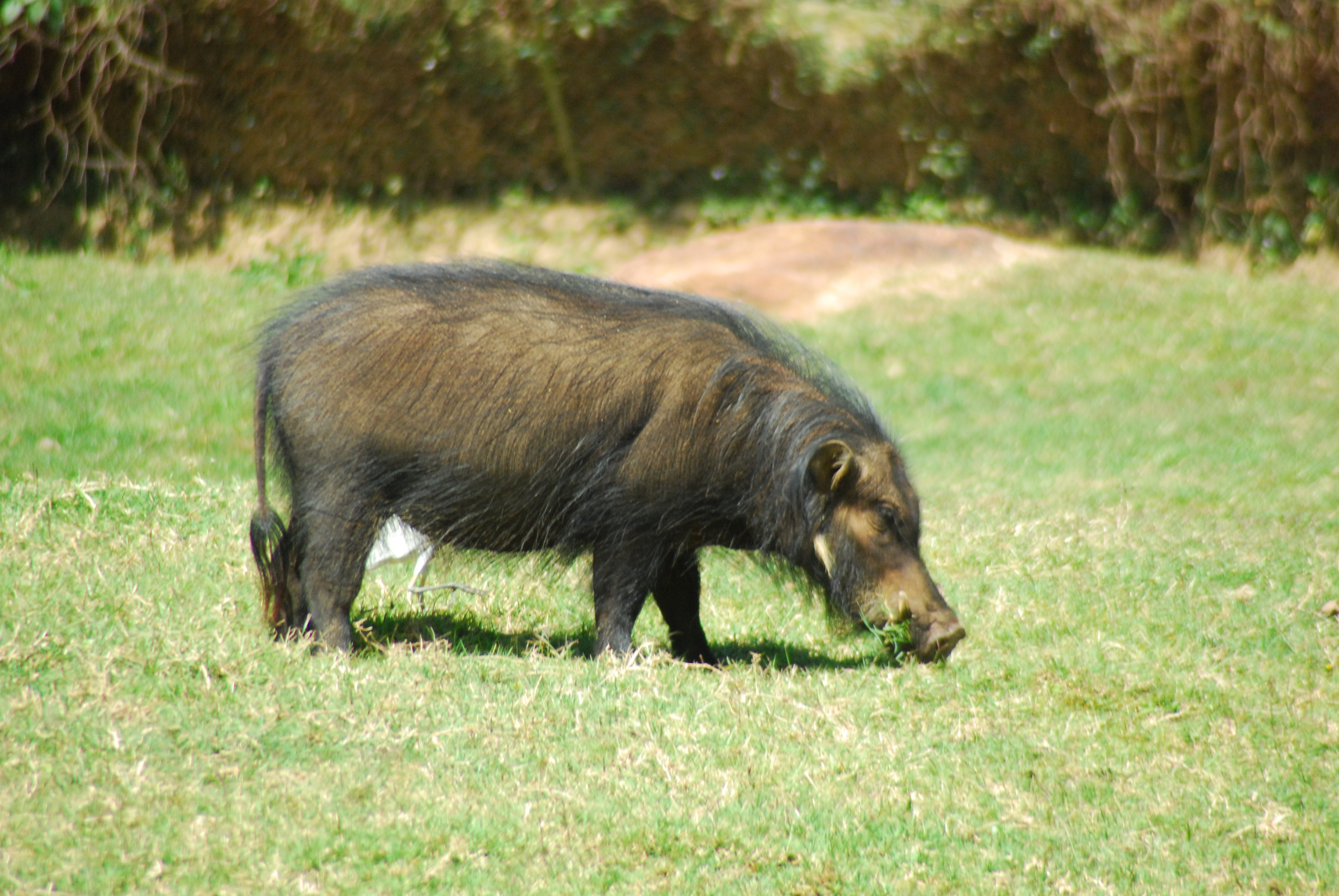

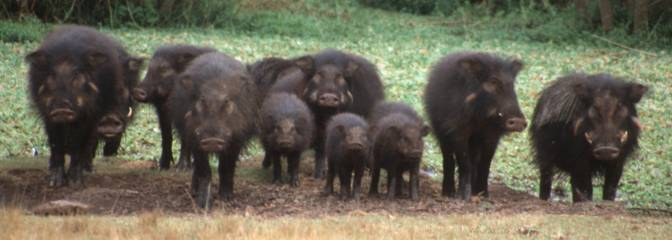

Conservation status
- Least Concern (IUCN 3.1)

Scientific classification
- Kingdom: Animalia
- Phylum: Chordata
- Class: Mammalia
- Order: Artiodactyla
- Family: Suidae
- Genus: Hylochoerus; Thomas, 1904
- Species: H. meinertzhageni

Binomial name
- Hylochoerus meinertzhageni Thomas, 1904
- H. m. ivoriensis H. m. rimator H. m. meinertzhageni

= Giant forest hog =

Species of mammal

The giant forest hog (Hylochoerus meinertzhageni), the only member of its genus (Hylochoerus), is native to wooded habitats in Africa and is one of the largest wild members of the pig family, Suidae, along with a few subspecies of the wild boar. It was first described in 1904. The specific name honours Richard Meinertzhagen, who shot the type specimen in Kenya and had it shipped to the Natural History Museum in England.

== Description ==
The giant forest hog is, on average, the largest living species of suid. Adults can measure from 1.3 to 2.1 m (4 ft 3 in to 6 ft 11 in) in head-and-body length, with an additional tail length of 25 to 45 cm (9.8 to 17.7 in). Adults stand 0.75 to 1.1 m (2 ft 6 in to 3 ft 7 in) in height at the shoulder, and can weigh from 100 to 275 kg (220 to 606 lb). Females are smaller than males. Females weigh a median of approximately 167 kg (368 lb), as opposed to males, which weigh a median of 210 kg (460 lb). The eastern nominate subspecies is slightly larger than H. m. rimator of Central Africa and noticeably larger than H. m. ivoriensis of West Africa, with the latter sometimes being scarcely larger than related species such as the bushpig with a top recorded weight of around 150 kg (330 lb). The giant forest hog has extensive hairs on its body, though these tend to become less pronounced as the animal ages. It is mostly black in colour on the surface, though hairs nearest the skin of the animal are a deep orange colour. Its ears are large and pointy, and the tusks are proportionally smaller than those of the warthogs, but bigger than those of the bushpig. Nevertheless, the tusks of a male may reach a length of 35.9 centimetres (14.1 in).

== Distribution ==
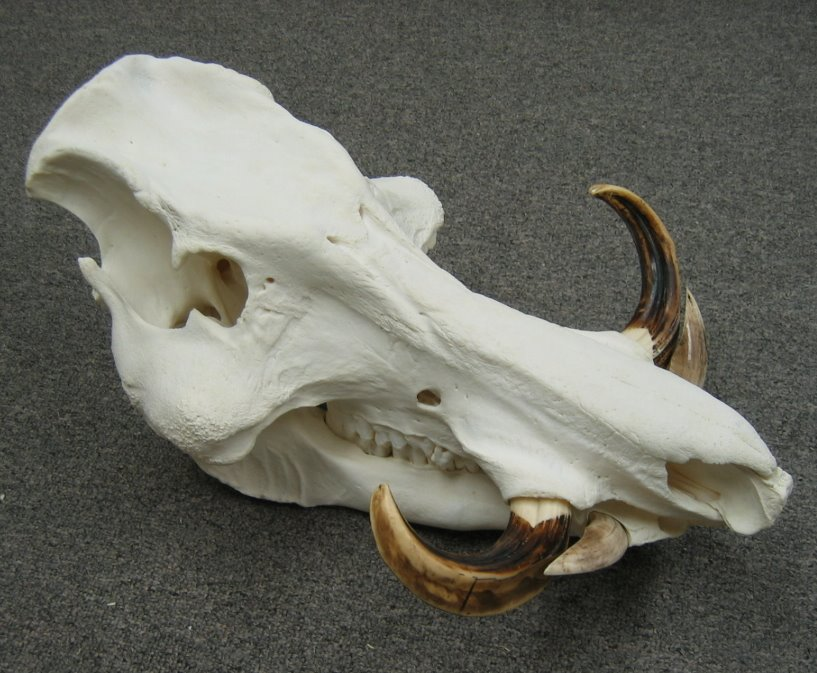
The skull of a male giant forest hog

Giant forest hogs occur in west and central Africa, where they are largely restricted to the Guinean and Congolese forests. They also occur more locally in humid highlands of the Rwenzori Mountains, on the border between Uganda and the Democratic Republic of the Congo, and as far east as Mount Kenya and the Ethiopian Highlands. They are mainly found in forest-grassland mosaics, but can also be seen in wooded savanna and subalpine habitats at altitudes up to 3,800 m (12,500 ft). They are unable to cope with low humidity or prolonged exposure to the sun, resulting in their being absent from arid regions and habitats devoid of dense cover.

== Habits ==
The giant forest hog is mainly a herbivore, but also scavenges. It is usually considered nocturnal, but in cold periods, it is more commonly seen during daylight hours, and it may be diurnal in regions where protected from humans. They live in herds (sounders) of up to 20 animals consisting of females and their offspring, but usually also including a single old male. Females leave the sounder before giving birth and return with the piglets about a week after parturition. All members of the sounder protect the piglets, and a piglet can nurse from all females. Boars fight by running head on into each other, followed by head pushing and attempts to slash the opponent with their lower tusks.

As with all suids of Sub-Saharan Africa, the giant forest hog has not been domesticated, but it is easily tamed and has been considered to have potential for domestication. In the wild, though, the giant forest hog is more feared than the red river hog and the bushpig (the two members of the genus Potamochoerus), as males sometimes attack without warning, possibly to protect their group. It has also been known to drive spotted hyenas away from carcasses, and fights among males resulting in the death of one of the participants are not uncommon. Despite its size and potential for aggressive behaviour, they have been known to fall prey to leopards (probably almost exclusively large male forest leopards which are often larger than their savannah-dwelling equivalents) and clans of spotted hyenas. Although in some localities the lion may also be a predator of giant forest hogs, the species are usually segregated by habitat, as African lions do not generally occur in the densely forested habitats inhabited by this suid.
