= Buru babirusa =

Conservation status
- Vulnerable (IUCN 3.1)
- CITES Appendix I

Scientific classification
- Kingdom: Animalia
- Phylum: Chordata
- Class: Mammalia
- Order: Artiodactyla
- Family: Suidae
- Genus: Babyrousa
- Species: B. babyrussa

Binomial name
- Babyrousa babyrussa (Linnaeus, 1758)
- Range (in brown)

Synonyms
- Sus babyrussa Linnaeus, 1758

Species of mammal

The Buru babirusa (Babyrousa babyrussa) is a wild pig-like animal native to the Indonesian islands of Buru, the two Sula Islands of Mangole and Taliabu. It is also known as the Moluccan babirusa, golden babirusa, and hairy babirusa. Traditionally, this relatively small species included the other babirusas as subspecies, but it has been recommended treating them as separate species based on differences in their morphology. As also suggested by its alternative common names, the Buru babirusa has relatively long thick, gold-brown body-hair – a feature not shared by the other extant babirusas.

In absence of detailed data on the Buru babirusa, it is generally assumed that its habitat and ecology are similar to that of North Sulawesi babirusa (B. celebensis). Furthermore, as all babirusas were considered conspecific under the scientific name B. babyrussa until 2001, data collected before that is consistently listed under the name B. babyrussa, though the vast majority actually refers to B. celebensis (by far the best known species of babirusa). Babirusas tend to occupy tropical rainforests, river banks and various natural ponds rich in water plants. They are omnivorous and feed on various leaves, roots, fruits, invertebrates and small vertebrates. Their jaws and teeth are strong enough to crack any kind of nuts. Babirusas lack the rostral bone in their nose, which is a tool used by other wild pigs for digging. Therefore, they prefer feeding on roots in soft muddy or sandy soils. Cannibalism was reported among babirusas, feeding on the young of their own species or other mammals. North Sulawesi babirusas form groups with up to a dozen of individuals, especially when raising their young. Older males might live individually.

The north Sulawesi babirusa reach sexual maturity when they are 5–10 months old. Their estrous cycle is 28–42 days, and the gestation period lasts 150–157 days. The females have two rows of teats and will give birth to 1–2 piglets weighing 380–1,050 grams (15–35 oz) and measuring 15–20 cm (6–8 inches), which they will nurse until the age of 6–8 months. The lifespan is about 24 years.

The Buru babirusa has been assessed as vulnerable on the IUCN Red List, as its habitat is restricted a total area of 20,000 km^{2} (7,700 sq mi), and its gradual loss due to logging. Hunting by the local population is another cause of concern. Whereas it is unpopular among Muslim communities for religious reasons, it is widely hunted by the indigenous people of Buru, which are predominantly Christian. The meat of the Buru babirusa has low fat (only 1.27% compared to 5–15% for domestic pigs) and is regarded as a delicacy. It is also preferred by the locals to the meat of other wild pigs or deer in terms of texture and flavor. The establishment of two protected areas on Buru, Gunung Kapalat Mada (1,380 km^{2} or 530 sq mi) and Waeapo (50 km^{2} or 20 sq mi), partly aim at preserving the habitat of the Buru babirusa. This species also enjoys full protection under Indonesian law since 1931.

3D scans of the skull and mandible (lower jaw) of a babirusa
