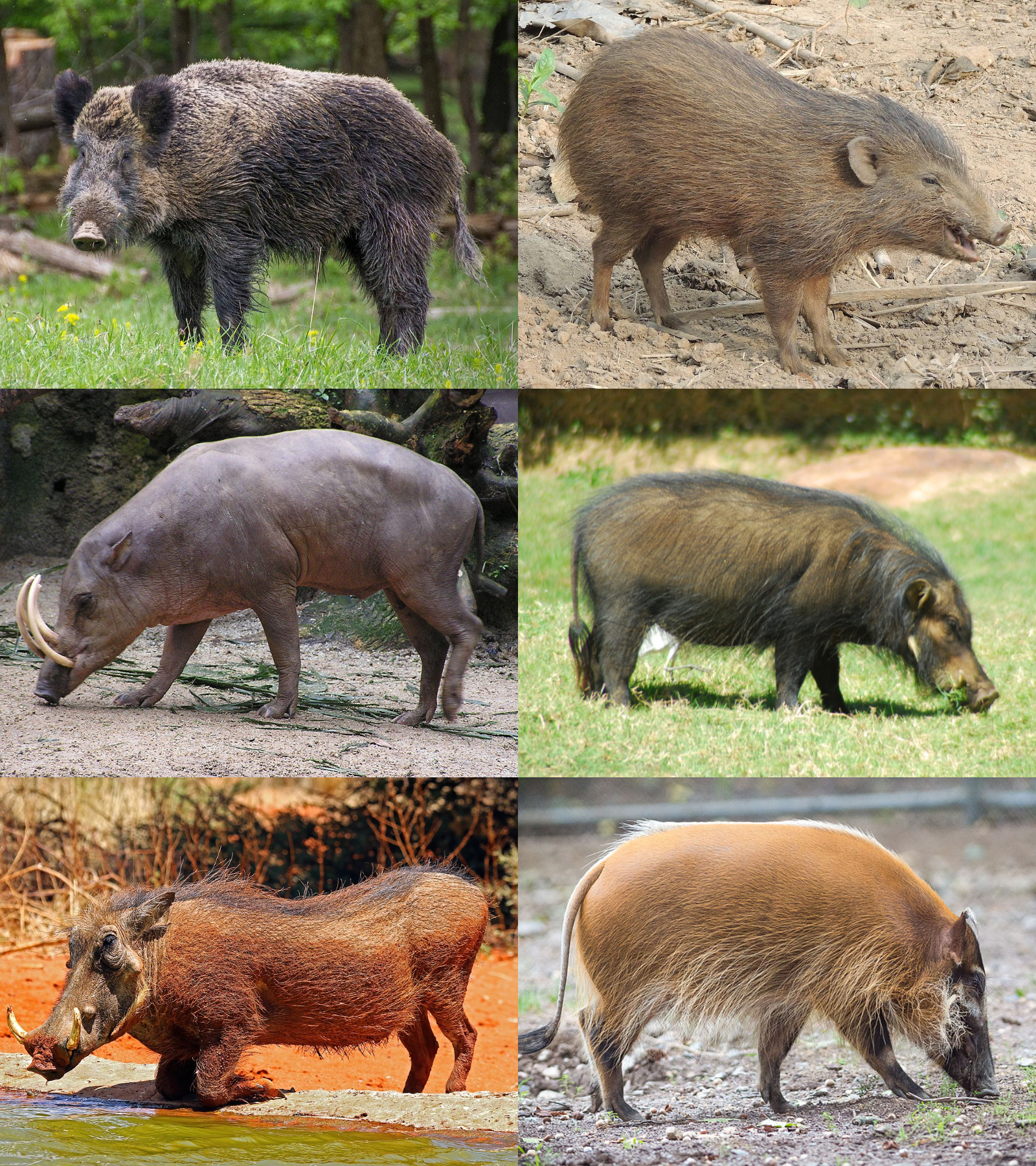
- Suid species of different genera; from top-left, clockwise: Wild boar (Sus scrofa), pygmy hog (Porcula salvania), giant forest hog (Hylochoerus meinertzhageni), red river hog (Potamochoerus porcus), common warthog (Phacochoerus africanus), North Sulawesi babirusa (Babyrousa celebensis)

Scientific classification
- Kingdom: Animalia
- Phylum: Chordata
- Class: Mammalia
- Order: Artiodactyla
- Suborder: Suina
- Family: Suidae; Gray, 1821

Type genus
- Sus Linnaeus, 1758

Genera
- Over 30 extinct genera, 6 extant, see text.
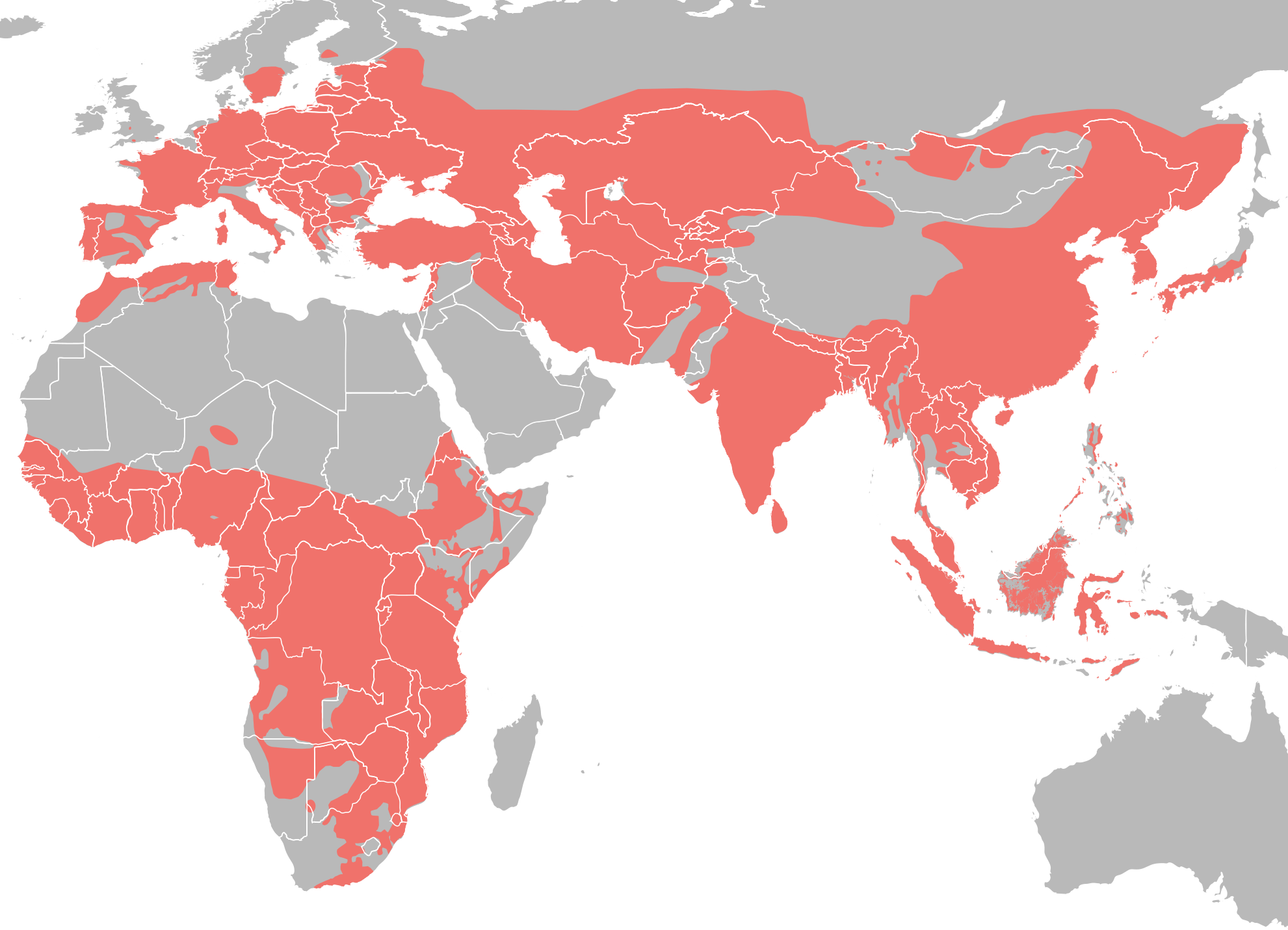
- Native Suidae distribution

= Suidae =

Suidae Temporal range: Oligocene–Holocene

Family of mammals belonging to even-toed ungulates

Suidae is a family of artiodactyl mammals which are commonly called pigs, hogs, or swine. In addition to numerous fossil species, 18 extant species are currently recognized (or 19 counting domestic pigs and wild boars separately), classified into between four and eight genera. Within this family, the genus Sus includes the domestic pig, Sus scrofa domesticus or Sus domesticus, and many species of wild pig from Europe to the Pacific. Other genera include babirusas and warthogs. All suids, or swine, are native to the Old World, ranging across Afro-Eurasia.

The earliest fossil suids date from the Oligocene epoch in Asia, and their descendants reached Europe during the Miocene. Several fossil species are known and show adaptations to a wide range of different diets, from strict herbivory to possible carrion-eating (in Tetraconodontinae).

== Taxonomy ==
=== Species ===
The following 18 extant species of suid are currently recognised:

| Image | Genus | Living species |
|---|---|---|
| | Sus | S. ahoenobarbus – Palawan bearded pig; S. barbatus – Bornean bearded pig; S. cebifrons – Visayan warty pig; S. celebensis – Sulawesi warty pig; S. oliveri – Mindoro warty pig; S. philippensis – Philippine warty pig; S. scrofa – wild boar; S. s. domesticus – domestic pig (sometimes treated as a full species, S. domestica); S. verrucosus – Javan warty pig |
| | Porcula | P. salvania – pygmy hog |
| | Hylochoerus | H. meinertzhageni – giant forest hog |
| | Potamochoerus | P. larvatus – bushpig; P. porcus – red river hog |
| | Phacochoerus | P. africanus – common warthog; P. aethiopicus – desert warthog |
| | Babyrousa | B. babyrussa – Moluccan babirusa; B. bolabatuensis – Bola Batu babirusa; B. celebensis – North Sulawesi babirusa; B. togeanensis – Togian babirusa |

=== Phylogeny ===
Cladogram of Suidae. Mikko's Phylogeny Archive (Based is McKenna & Bell, 1997, Liu, 2003 и Harris & Liu, 2007):

- - ? † Mabokopithecus
  - † Hemichoerus
  - † Paradoxodonides
  - † Cainochoerus
  - - † Hyotheriinae
      - † Chleuastochoerus
      - † Dubiotherium
      - † Sinapriculus
      - † Hyotherium
    - - - † Listriodontinae
          - † Listriodon
          - † Lopholistriodon
          - † Eurolistriodon
          - † Bunolistriodon
        - † Kubanochoerinae
          - † Nguruwe
          - ? † Kenyasus
          - † Libycochoerus
          - † Megalochoerus
          - † Kubanochoerus
      - - † Miochoerus
        - - † Tetraconodontinae
            - † Conohyus
            - † Tetraconodon
            - † Parachleuastochoerus
            - † Lophochoerus
            - - † Sivachoerus
              - - † Nyanzachoerus
                - † Notochoerus
          - - † Namachoerinae
              † Namachoerus
            - Suinae
              - Suini
                - † Korynochoerus
                - † Hippopotamodon
                - † Eumaiochoerus
                - † Microstonyx
                - Sus sensu lato
                  - Sus sensu stricto
                  - Porcula
                  - ? Dasychoerus
                  - ? Euhys
              - - Potamochoerini
                  - ? † Celebochoerus
                  - ? † Propotamochoerus
                  - † "Kolpochoerus" afarensis
                  - - Potamochoerus
                    - - † Kolpochoerus
                      - Hylochoerus
                - - † Hippohyini
                    - † Sivahyus
                    - † Hippohyus
                    - ? † Sinohyus
                  - - Babyrousini
                      Babyrousa
                    - Phacochoerini
                      - † Potamochoeroides
                      - † Metridiochoerus
                      - Phacochoerus

== Physical characteristics ==
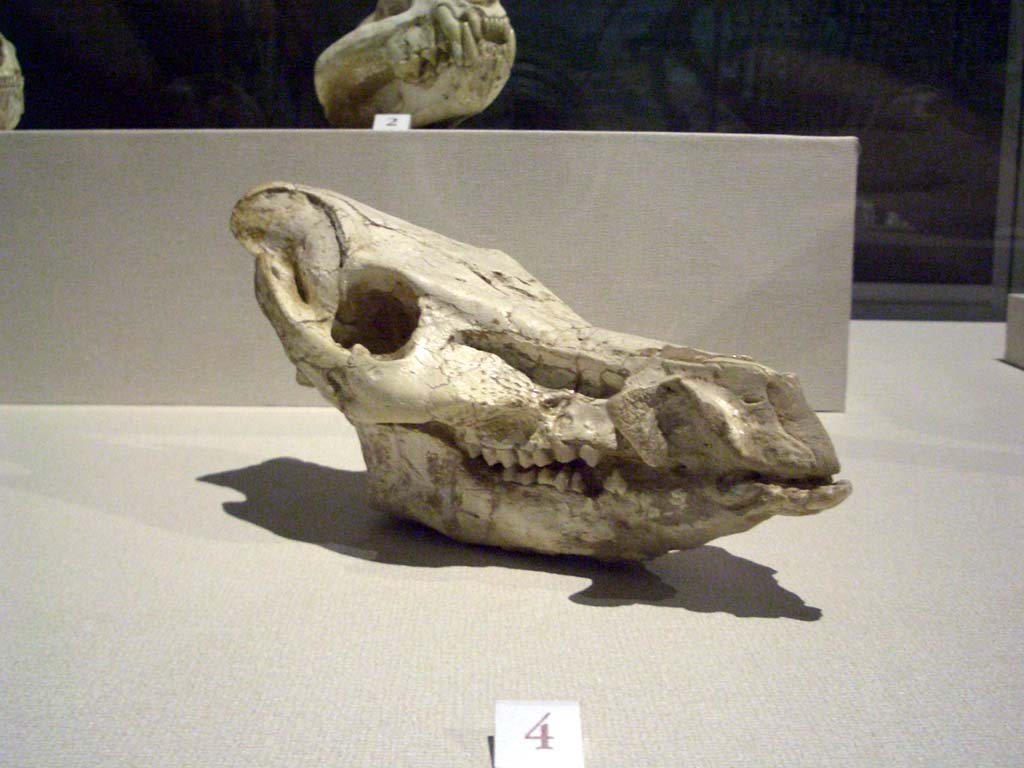
†Chleuastochoerus fossil skull

Suids belong to the order Artiodactyla, and are generally regarded as the living members of that order most similar to the ancestral form. Unlike most other members of the order, they have four hooves on each foot, although they walk only on the middle two digits, with the others staying clear of the ground. They also have a simple stomach, rather than the more complex ruminant stomach found in most other artiodactyl families.

They are small to medium animals, varying in size from 58 to 66 cm (23 to 26 in) in length, and 6 to 9 kg (13 to 20 lb) in weight in the case of the pygmy hog, to 130–210 cm (4.3–6.9 ft) and 100–275 kg (220–606 lb) in the giant forest hog. They have large heads and short necks, with relatively small eyes and prominent ears. Their heads have a distinctive snout, ending in a disc-shaped nose with a neomorphic bone called the rostral that aids in foraging. Suids typically have a bristly coat, and a short tail ending in a tassel. The males possess a corkscrew-shaped penis, which fits into a similarly shaped groove in the female's cervix.

Suids have a well-developed sense of hearing, and are vocal animals, communicating with a series of grunts, squeals, and similar sounds. They also have an acute sense of smell. Many species are omnivorous, eating grass, leaves, roots, insects, worms, and even frogs or mice. Other species are more selective and purely herbivorous.

Their teeth reflect their diet, and suids retain the upper incisors, which are lost in most other artiodactyls. The canine teeth are enlarged to form prominent tusks, used for rooting in moist earth or undergrowth, and in fighting. They have only a short diastema. The number of teeth varies between species, but the general dental formula is: 1–3.1.2–4.33.1.2.3.

== Behavior and reproduction ==
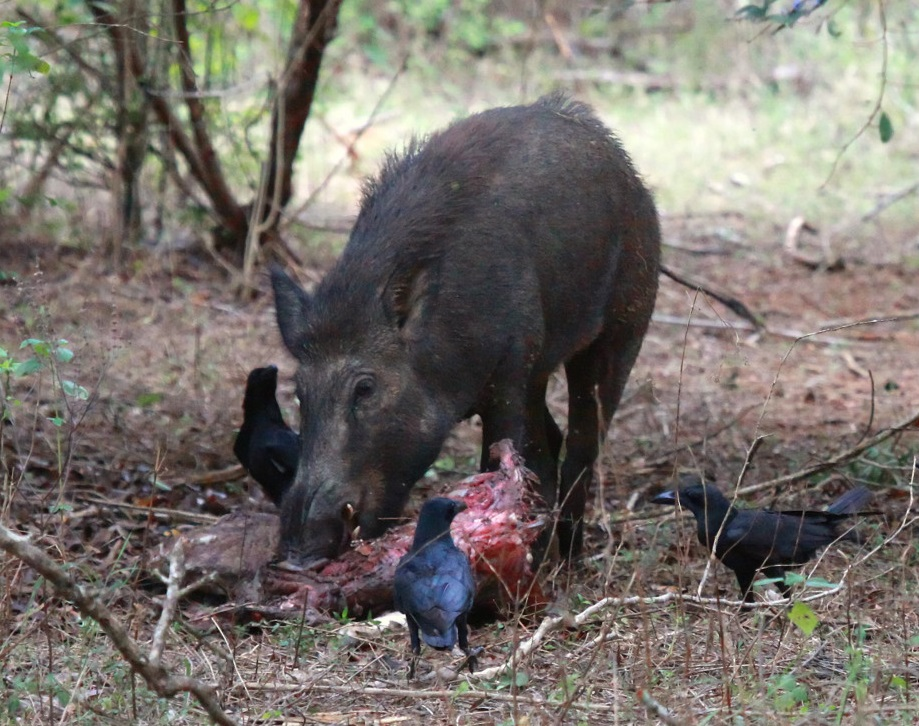
Wild boar feeding on carcass in Yala National Park, Sri Lanka

Suids are intelligent and adaptable animals. Adult females (sows) and their young travel in a group (sounder; see List of animal names), while adult males (boars) are either solitary, or travel in small bachelor groups. Males generally are not territorial, and come into conflict only during the mating season.

Litter size varies between one and twelve, depending on the species. The mother prepares a grass nest or similar den, which the young leave after about ten days. Suids are weaned at around three months, and become sexually mature at 18 months. In practice, however, male suids are unlikely to gain access to sows in the wild until they have reached their full physical size, at around four years of age. In all species, the male is significantly larger than the female, and possesses more prominent tusks.
