= List of suines =

Species in mammal suborder Suina

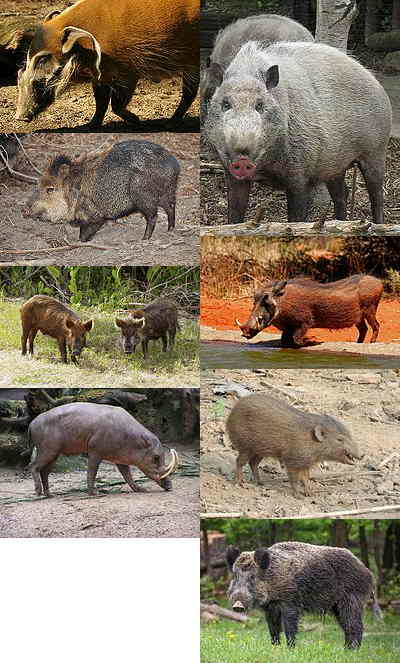
Eight suine species (counter-clockwise from top left): red river hog (Potamochoerus porcus), collared peccary (Dicotyles tajacu), feral pigs (Sus scrofa domesticus), north Sulawesi babirusa (Babyrousa celebensis), wild boar (Sus scrofa), pygmy hog (Porcula salvanius), common warthog (Phacochoerus africanus), and Bornean bearded pig (Sus barbatus)

Suina, also known as Suiformes, is a suborder of omnivorous, non-ruminant hoofed mammals in the order Artiodactyla. A member of this clade is called a suine. It includes the family Suidae, termed suids or colloquially pigs or swine, as well as the family Tayassuidae, termed tayassuids or peccaries. Suines are largely native to Africa, South America, and Southeast Asia, with the exception of the wild boar, which is additionally native to Europe and Asia and introduced to North America and Australasia, including widespread use in farming of the domestic pig subspecies. Suines range in size from the 55 cm (22 in) long pygmy hog to the 210 cm (83 in) long giant forest hog, and are primarily found in forest, shrubland, and grassland biomes, though some can be found in deserts, wetlands, or coastal regions. Most species do not have population estimates, though approximately two billion domestic pigs are used in farming, while several species are considered endangered or critically endangered with populations as low as 100.

The 20 extant species of Suina are split between the Suidae family, containing 17 species belonging to six genera, and the Tayassuidae family, containing three species in three genera. All extant suids are members of the Suinae subfamily; extinct species have also been placed into Suinae as well as other subfamilies. Dozens of extinct Suina species have been discovered, though due to ongoing research and discoveries the exact number and categorization is not fixed.

== Conventions ==
IUCN Red List categories
Conservation status
- EX: Extinct (0 species)
- EW: Extinct in the wild (0 species)
- CR: Critically endangered (1 species)
- EN: Endangered (4 species)
- VU: Vulnerable (6 species)
- NT: Near threatened (2 species)
- LC: Least concern (7 species)

Other categories
- DD: Data deficient (0 species)
- NE: Not evaluated (0 species)

The author citation for the species or genus is given after the scientific name; parentheses around the author citation indicate that this was not the original taxonomic placement. Conservation status codes listed follow the International Union for Conservation of Nature (IUCN) Red List of Threatened Species. Range maps are provided wherever possible; if a range map is not available, a description of the species's range is provided. Ranges are based on the IUCN Red List for that species unless otherwise noted. All extinct species or subspecies listed alongside extant species went extinct after 1500 CE, and are indicated by a dagger symbol "†".

== Classification ==
The suborder Suina consists of 20 extant species in nine genera, divided into dozens of subspecies. These are split between the Suidae family, containing 17 species belonging to 6 genera, and the Tayassuidae family, containing 3 species in 3 genera. This does not include hybrid species such as boar–pig hybrids or extinct prehistoric species.

- Family Suidae (Pigs)
  - Genus Babyrousa: three species
  - Genus Hylochoerus: one species
  - Genus Phacochoerus: two species
  - Genus Porcula: one species
  - Genus Potamochoerus: two species
  - Genus Sus: eight species
- Family Tayassuidae (Peccaries)
  - Genus Catagonus: one species
  - Genus Dicotyles: one species
  - Genus Tayassu: one species

- Suina
  - Suidae
    - - - Sus
        - Porcula
      - - Potamochoerus
        - - Hylochoerus
          - Phacochoerus
    - Babyrousa
  - Tayassuidae
    - Dicotyles
    - - Tayassu
      - Catagonus

== Suines ==
The following classification is based on the taxonomy described by Mammal Species of the World (2005), with augmentation by generally accepted proposals made since using molecular phylogenetic analysis. There are several additional proposals which are disputed, such as the creation of a fourth species of peccary, the giant peccary (Pecari maximus), which are not included here.

=== Suidae ===
Genus Babyrousa – Perry, 1811 – three species
Common name	Scientific name and subspecies	Range	Size and ecology	IUCN status and estimated population
Buru babirusa	B. babyrussa (Linnaeus, 1758)	Buru, Mangole, and Taliabu islands in Indonesia	Size: 85–110 cm (33–43 in) long, plus 20–32 cm (8–13 in) tail Habitat: Forest and inland wetlands Diet: Fruit and browse	VU Unknown
North Sulawesi babirusa	B. celebensis (Deninger, 1909)	Sulawesi and nearby Indonesian islands	Size: 85–110 cm (33–43 in) long, plus 20–32 cm (8–13 in) tail Habitat: Forest and inland wetlands Diet: Fruit and browse	VU 10,000
Togian babirusa	B. togeanensis (Sody, 1949)	Togian Islands of Indonesia	Size: Unknown, but likely the largest babirusa species Habitat: Forest, inland wetlands, and intertidal marine Diet: Fruit, rhizomes, tamarinds, cacao, herbs, and vegetables	EN 1,000

Genus Hylochoerus – Thomas, 1904 – one species
Common name	Scientific name and subspecies	Range	Size and ecology	IUCN status and estimated population
Giant forest hog	H. meinertzhageni Thomas, 1904 Three subspecies: H. m. ivoriensis; H. m. meinertzhageni; H. m. rimator	Scattered central Africa	Size: 130–210 cm (51–83 in) long, plus 25–45 cm (10–18 in) tail Habitat: Forest Diet: Large variety of plants, particularly herbaceous plants	LC Unknown

Genus Phacochoerus – F. Cuvier, 1826 – two species
Common name	Scientific name and subspecies	Range	Size and ecology	IUCN status and estimated population
Common warthog	P. africanus (Gmelin, 1788) Four subspecies: P. a. aeliani (Eritrean warthog); P. a. africanus (Nolan warthog); P. a. massaicus (Central African warthog); P. a. sundevallii (Southern warthog)	Sub-saharan Africa	Size: 90–150 cm (35–59 in) long Habitat: Forest, savanna, shrubland, and grassland Diet: Grass, as well as roots, berries, bark, and carrion	LC 250,000
Desert warthog	P. aethiopicus (Pallas, 1766) Two subspecies: P. a. aethiopicus (Cape warthog)†; P. a. delamerei	Eastern Africa	Size: 100–145 cm (39–57 in) long Habitat: Savanna and shrubland Diet: A variety of grass, shrubs, and tubers, as well as fruit and insects	LC Unknown

Genus Porcula – Hodgson, 1847 – one species
Common name	Scientific name and subspecies	Range	Size and ecology	IUCN status and estimated population
Pygmy hog	P. salvania (Hodgson, 1847)	Southern Bhutan and northwest India	Size: 55–71 cm (22–28 in) long, plus tail Habitat: Grassland Diet: Roots, grass, tubers, and invertebrates	EN 100–250

Genus Potamochoerus – Gray, 1854 – two species
Common name	Scientific name and subspecies	Range	Size and ecology	IUCN status and estimated population
Bushpig	P. larvatus (F. Cuvier, 1822) Six subspecies: P. l. edwardsi (Edwards' bushpig); P. l. hassama (White-faced bushpig); P. l. koiropotamus (Southern bushpig); P. l. larvatus (Madagascar bushpig); P. l. nyasae (Nyasan bushpig); P. l. somaliensis (Somalian bushpig)	Southeastern Africa	Size: 100–150 cm (39–59 in) long Habitat: Forest and shrubland Diet: Roots, tubers, fruit, invertebrates, small vertebrates, and carrion	LC Unknown
Red river hog	P. porcus (Linnaeus, 1758)	Western Africa	Size: 100–150 cm (39–59 in) long, plus 30–40 cm (12–16 in) tail Habitat: Forest Diet: Fruit and seeds, as well as carrion	LC Unknown

Genus Sus – Linnaeus, 1758 – eight species
Common name	Scientific name and subspecies	Range	Size and ecology	IUCN status and estimated population
Bornean bearded pig	S. barbatus Müller, 1838 Two subspecies: S. b. barbatus; S. b. oi (Western bearded pig)	Southeast Asia	Size: 100–170 cm (39–67 in) long, plus 20–50 cm (8–20 in) tail Habitat: Forest, inland wetlands, neritic marine, and intertidal marine Diet: Roots, fungi, invertebrates, small vertebrates, turtle eggs, carrion, and a variety of plants	VU Unknown
Celebes warty pig	S. celebensis Müller, Schlegel, 1843 Three subspecies: S. c. celebensis; S. c. floresianus; S. c. timoriensis	Indonesian island of Sulawesi	Size: 80–130 cm (31–51 in) long Habitat: Forest, grassland, and inland wetlands Diet: Roots, fallen fruit, leaves, and young shoots, as well as invertebrates, small vertebrates, and carrion	NT Unknown
Javan warty pig	S. verrucosus F. Boie, 1832 Two subspecies: S. v. blouchi; S. v. verrucosus	Indonesian islands of Java and Bawean	Size: 90–190 cm (35–75 in) long Habitat: Forest and grassland Diet: Omnivorous; wide variety of plants and small vertebrates	EN Unknown
Oliver's warty pig	S. oliveri Groves, 1997	Philippines island of Mindoro	Size: Specific measurements not available, but likely similar to the Philippine warty pig Habitat: Forest, savanna, shrubland, and grassland Diet: Believed to eat a wide variety of plant and animal matter	VU Unknown
Palawan bearded pig	S. ahoenobarbus Huet, 1888	Philippines	Size: 100–160 cm (39–63 in) long Habitat: Forest Diet: Omnivorous; wide variety of plants, invertebrates, small vertebrates, and carrion	NT Unknown
Philippine warty pig	S. philippensis Nehring, 1886 Two subspecies: S. p. mindanensis; S. p. philippensis	Western Philippines	Size: Specific measurements not available Habitat: Forest, shrubland, and grassland Diet: Tubers, fruit, and invertebrates	VU Unknown
Visayan warty pig	S. cebifrons Heude, 1888 Two subspecies: S. c. cebifrons (Cebu warty pig)†; S. c. negrinus (Negros warty pig)	Visayan Islands in the Philippines	Size: 90–125 cm (35–49 in) long, plus 23 cm (9 in) tail Habitat: Forest and grassland Diet: Omnivorous; wide variety of plants and small vertebrates	CR Unknown
Wild boar	S. scrofa Linnaeus, 1758 Seventeen subspecies: S. s. algira (North African boar); S. s. attila (Carpathian boar); S. s. cristatus (Indian boar); S. s. davidi (Central Asian boar); S. s. domesticus (Domestic pig); S. s. leucomystax (Japanese boar); S. s. libycus (Anatolian boar); S. s. majori (Maremman boar); S. s. meridionalis (Mediterranean boar); S. s. moupinensis (Northern Chinese boar); S. s. nigripes (Middle Asian boar); S. s. riukiuanus (Ryukyu boar); S. s. scrofa (Central European boar); S. s. sibiricus (Trans-Baikal boar); S. s. taivanus (Formosan boar); S. s. ussuricus (Ussuri boar); S. s. vittatus (Banded pig)	Eurasia and North Africa; introduced to parts of United States, South America, and Oceania	Size: 90–200 cm (35–79 in) long, plus 15–40 cm (6–16 in) tail Habitat: Forest, savanna, shrubland, grassland, inland wetlands, and desert Diet: Omnivorous; variety of plants, small vertebrates, invertebrates, and carrion	LC Unknown (about 2 billion S. s. domesticus used in farming)

=== Tayassuidae ===
Genus Catagonus – Ameghino, 1904 – one species
Common name	Scientific name and subspecies	Range	Size and ecology	IUCN status and estimated population
Chacoan peccary	C. wagneri Rusconi, 1930	Gran Chaco region of central South America	Size: 96–118 cm (38–46 in) long Habitat: Savanna and shrubland Diet: Cacti, as well as roots, fruit, and forbs	EN Unknown

Genus Dicotyles – Cuvier, 1816 – one species
Common name	Scientific name and subspecies	Range	Size and ecology	IUCN status and estimated population
Collared peccary	D. tajacu (Linnaeus, 1758) Fourteen subspecies: D. t. angulatus; D. t. bangsi; D. t. crassus; D. t. crusnigrum; D. t. humeralis; D. t. nanus; D. t. nelsoni; D. t. niger; D. t. nigrescens; D. t. patira; D. t. sonoriensis; D. t. tajacu; D. t. torvus; D. t. yucatanensis	South America, Central America, and southern North America	Size: 80–100 cm (31–39 in) long Habitat: Forest, savanna, shrubland, grassland, and desert Diet: Roots, tubers, fruits, seeds, as well as green plants, insects, and small animals	LC Unknown

Genus Tayassu – Fischer von Waldheim, 1814 – one species
Common name	Scientific name and subspecies	Range	Size and ecology	IUCN status and estimated population
White-lipped peccary	T. pecari (Link, 1795) Five subspecies: T. p. aequatoris; T. p. albirostris; T. p. pecari; T. p. ringens; T. p. spiradens	South America and Central America	Size: 75–100 cm (30–39 in) long, plus 1–6 cm (0–2 in) tail Habitat: Forest, savanna, shrubland, and grassland Diet: Fruit, as well as a variety of plants, invertebrates, fungi and fish	VU Unknown

== Sources ==
- Burnie, David (2017). Animal: The Definitive Visual Guide. DK. ISBN 978-1-4654-7086-7.
- Melletti, Mario; Meijaard, Erik, eds. (2017). Ecology, Conservation and Management of Wild Pigs and Peccaries. Cambridge University Press. ISBN 978-1-316-95340-2.
- Wilson, Don E.; Mittermeier, Russell A., eds. (2011). Handbook of the Mammals of the World. Vol. 2 (Hoofed Mammals). Lynx Edicions. ISBN 978-84-96553-77-4.
- IUCN/SSC Hippo Specialist Group; IUCN/SSC Pigs and Peccaries Specialist Group (1993). Oliver, William L. R. (ed.). Pigs, Peccaries, and Hippos: Status Survey and Conservation Action Plan. International Union for Conservation of Nature. ISBN 978-2-8317-0141-7.
- Saha, Goutam Kumar; Mazumdar, Subhendu (2008). Threatened Mammals of India: Ecology and Management. Daya Publishing House. ISBN 978-81-7035-546-5.
