= Warty pig =

Warty pig may refer to:

- Sus bucculentus or Heude's pig, native to Laos and Vietnam
- Sus cebifrons cebifrons, native to Cebu, Philippines, now extinct
- Sus cebifrons, native to the Visayan Islands, Philippines
- Sus celebensis, native to Sulawesi, Indonesia
- Sus celebensis timoriensis, found in the Lesser Sunda Islands
- Sus heureni or Flores warty pig, native to southern Asia
- Sus oliveri, native to Mindoro, Philippines
- Sus philippensis, native to the Philippines
- Sus verrucosus, native to Indonesia

== See also ==
- Warthog (disambiguation)
