= Wild pigs of the Philippines =

Four endemic species

The Philippines has four endemic types of species of wild pigs (Filipino: baboy ramo). This makes the Philippines unique in having arguably the largest number of endemic wild pigs (Genus Sus). Two separate populations of unstudied wild pig species have been reported on the islands of Tawi-Tawi (near Sabah, Malaysia), and Tablas (in the central Philippines).

Hybridization with domestic pigs is becoming very common.

== Philippine wild pig species ==
- Visayan warty pig (Sus cebifrons)
- Philippine warty pig (Sus philippensis)
- Oliver's warty pig (Sus oliveri)
- Palawan bearded pig (Sus ahoenobarbus)
- Bearded pig (Sus barbatus)
