= Bearded pig =

Bearded pig may refer to:

- Bornean bearded pig, Sus barbatus, native to Sumatra, Borneo, and the Malay Peninsula
- Palawan bearded pig, Sus ahoenobarbus, native to the Philippines
