= Lists of pigs =

Pigs may refer to members of the domestic pig species Sus domesticus; the Sus genus that includes wild and domestic pigs; or the family Suidae that contains Sus.

Lists of pigs include:

- List of pig breeds
- List of suines, species in the suborder Suina, which includes Suidae and Tayassuidae
- List of individual pigs
- List of fictional pigs
