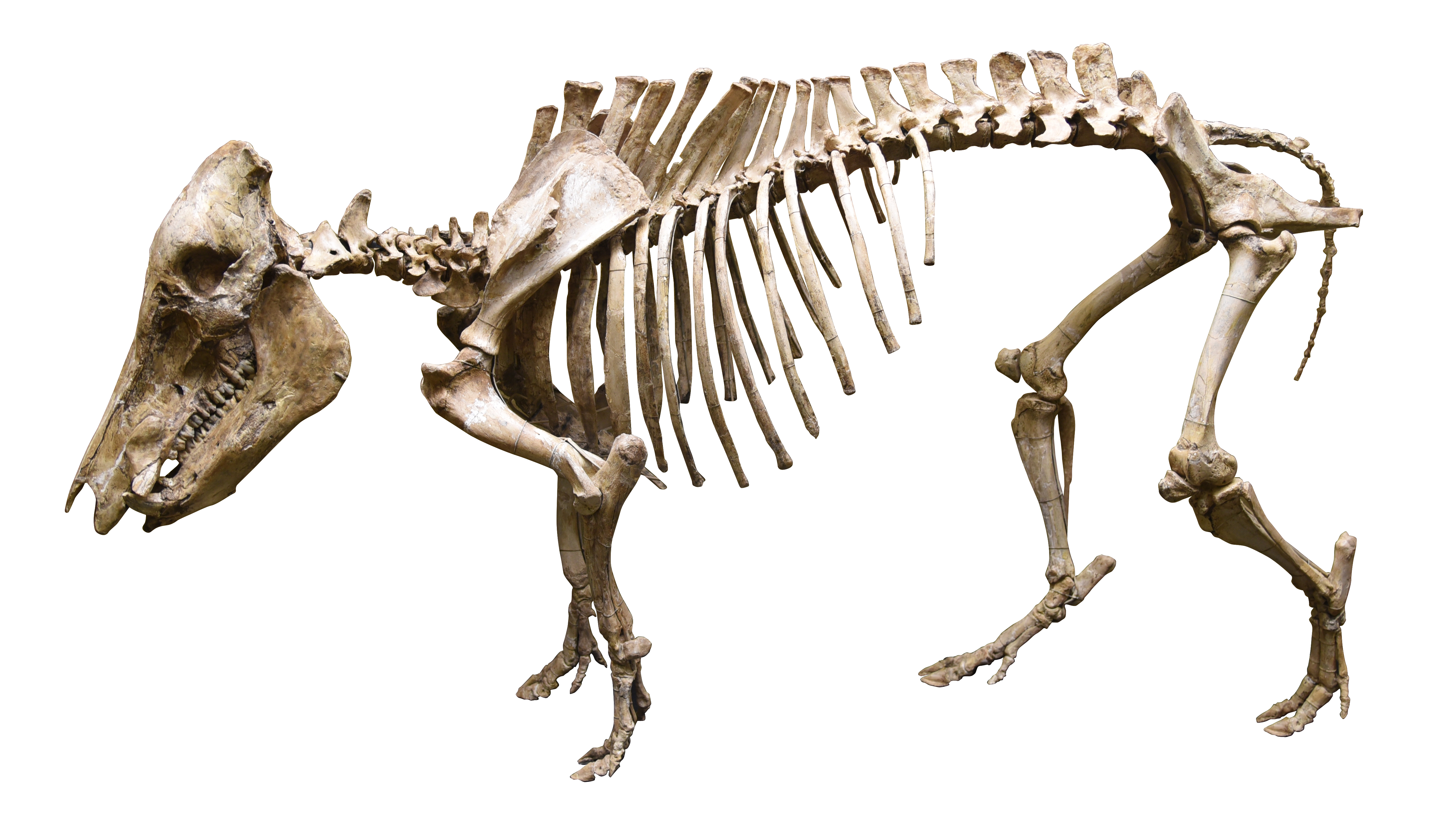
- Skeleton at the Naturhistorisches Museum, Basel
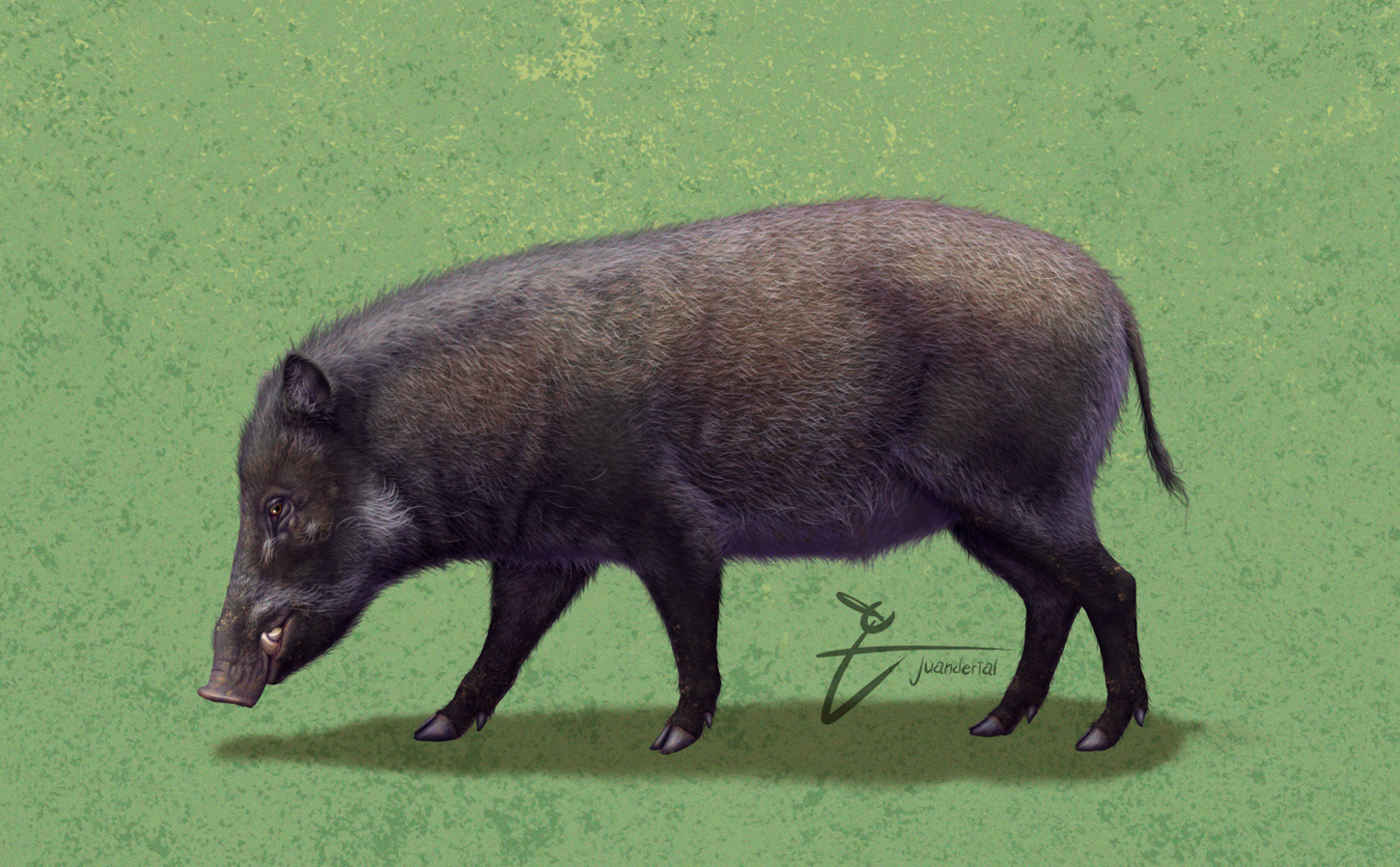
- Life reconstruction

Scientific classification
- Kingdom: Animalia
- Phylum: Chordata
- Class: Mammalia
- Order: Artiodactyla
- Family: Suidae
- Genus: Sus
- Species: †S. strozzi

Binomial name
- †Sus strozzi Forsyth Major, 1881

= Sus strozzi =

Sus strozzi Temporal range: Pliocene–Early Pleistocene

Extinct species of mammal

Sus strozzi is an extinct species of suid native to the Mediterranean region of Europe. It was more ancient than the boar and was eventually displaced by the latter when it entered Europe during the start of the Pleistocene.

== Description ==
Sus strozzi was larger than the modern-day wild boar. A skeleton from a young specimen indicates an animal of 150 cm (4.9 ft), while incomplete remains from an adult indicate an animal with a head-and-body length of 183 cm (6.00 ft). One recently found fossil was a 35 cm (14 in) jawbone from a male, much larger than the jawbone of any modern day species of Sus. It was possibly adapted to a swamp environment, and may have been ancestral to the modern Javan warty pig.
