= Crocolandia Foundation =

Crocolandia Foundation Inc.
- Interactive map of Crocolandia Foundation Inc.
- Date opened: 2001
- Location: Talisay City, Cebu, Philippines

The Crocolandia Foundation Inc., founded in 2001, is a nature conservation center located in Talisay City, Cebu, Philippines. The park houses birds, lizards, snakes, and crococodiles. The park also breeds endangered animals such as the Philippine crocodile and the sailfin lizard. The park's most famous resident is Lapu-Lapu, an estuarine crocodile. Other animals include civets, rufous hornbill, water buffalo, monitor lizards, myna, iguana, squirrel, turtles, peacock, deer and a Visayan warty pig. The park also has a museum, a library, gardens, and fishponds. The park is the first of its kind in Central Visayas.
