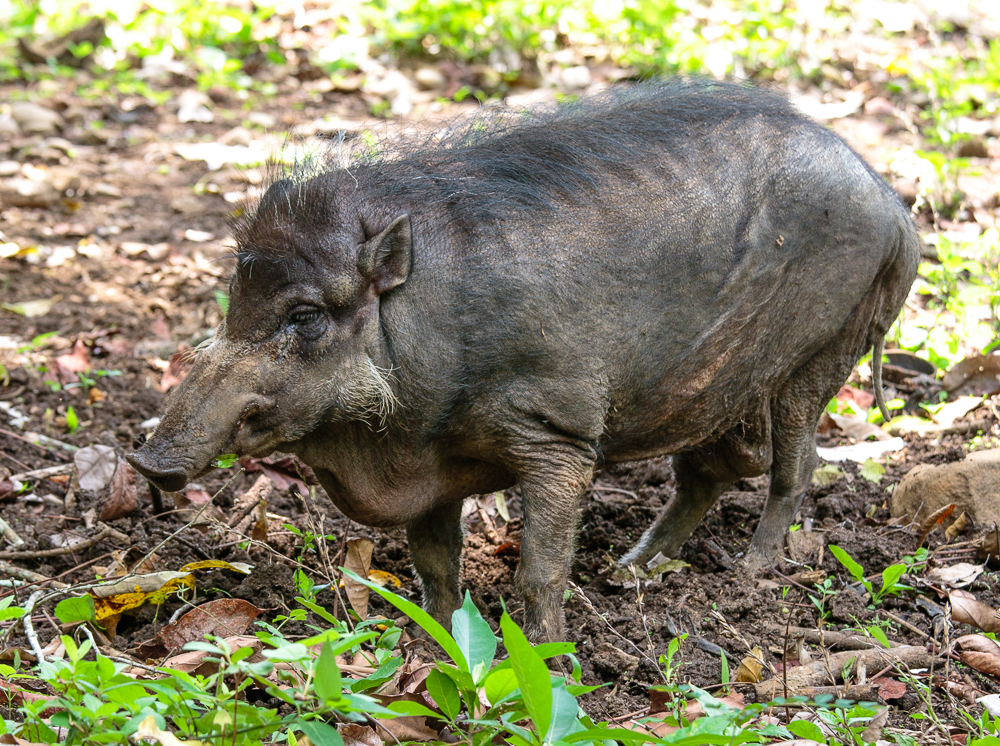

Conservation status
- Vulnerable (IUCN 3.1)

Scientific classification
- Kingdom: Animalia
- Phylum: Chordata
- Class: Mammalia
- Infraclass: Placentalia
- Order: Artiodactyla
- Family: Suidae
- Genus: Sus
- Species: S. philippensis

Binomial name
- Sus philippensis Nehring, 1886
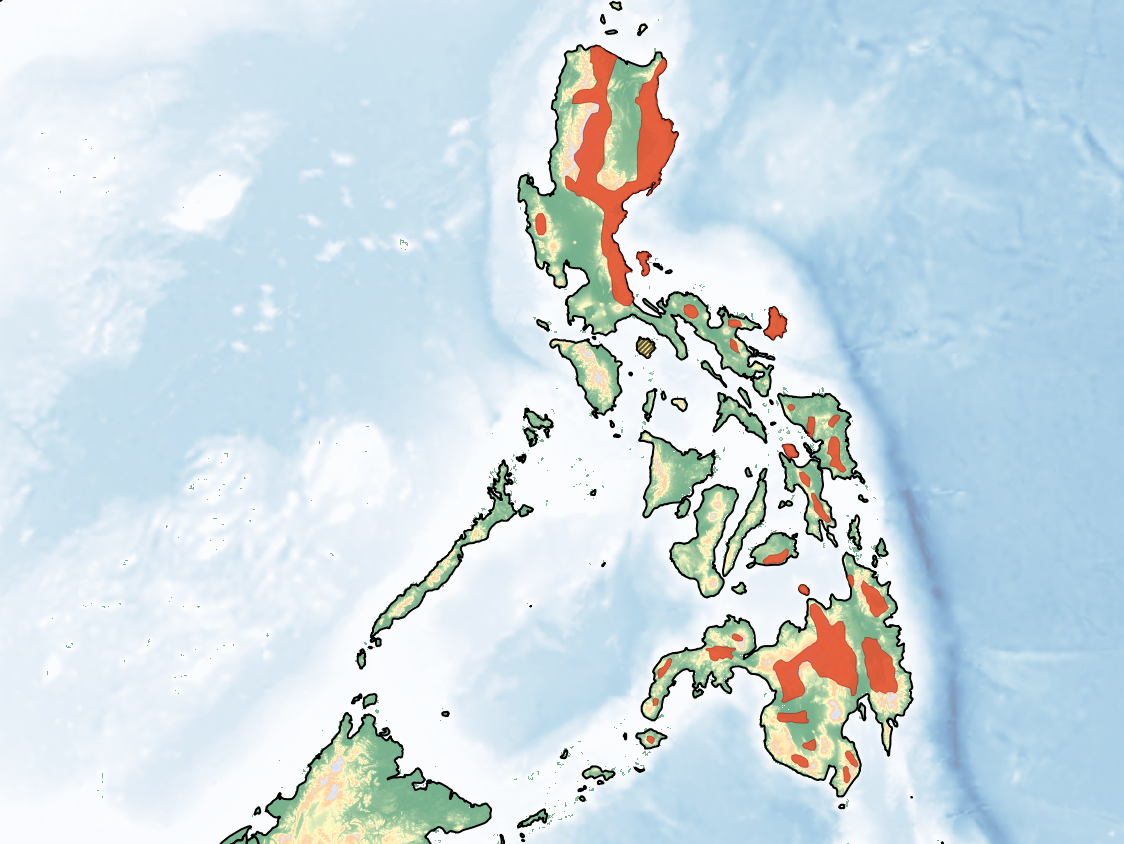

= Philippine warty pig =

Species of mammal

The Philippine warty pig (Sus philippensis) is one of four known species in the pig genus (Sus) endemic to the Philippines. They have tufts of hair on the top of their head and on the lower sides of their jaws, as well as four warts on their faces. Their skulls are elongated; males have tusks and bigger skulls than females, an example of sexual dimorphism. They are considered Vulnerable by the IUCN, and their population is currently declining due to multiple threats. The pigs are probably nocturnal.

The species was scientifically described in 1886 by Alfred Nehring. There are three recognized subspecies; two of which were described in the nineteenth century, and the third in 2008 based on skeletal remains.

== Description ==
Philippine warty pigs usually have black or dark brown fur, as well as recognizable white tufts on the side of their lower jaw (the gonion). Male pigs have four facial "warts", tusks, and gonial tufts which are larger and yellower than those of the females. In general, Suid pig males are substantially larger and tuskier than females. They also have tufts of hair on the tops of their heads, called crown tufts, and small "manes" on the back of their necks (but not further down their backs). Their heads are elongated and downward-sloping.

As with many members of the genus Sus, the pigs' straight lower canines are triangular in cross-section. The canines curve upwards and compromise the male pigs' tusks. In fact, the lower surface of Philippine warty pigs' canines is typically 150% greater in diameter than the posterior surface.

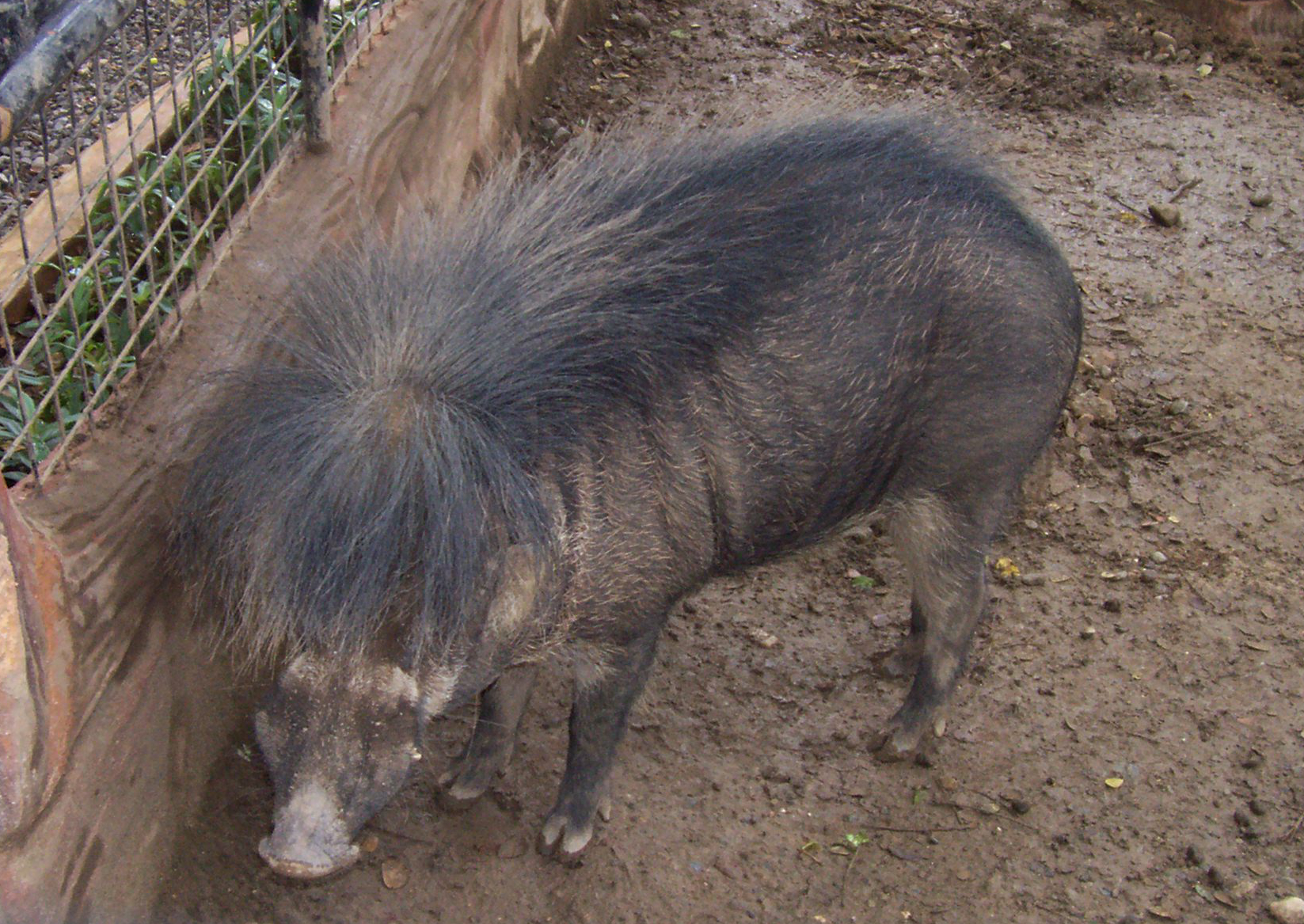
An individual in a zoo in Cebu. Note the crown tuft.

== Taxonomy ==
Sus philippensis was first scientifically described in 1886 by the German zoologist Alfred Nehring.

=== Subspecies ===
There are three recognized subspecies of the Philippine warty pig:

- S. p. philippensis, from Luzon and nearby islands. This subspecies has a grey forward-pointing crown tuft and large warts. It was described in 1886 by Nehring.
- S. p. mindanensis, from Samar, Leyte, and other islands near Mindanao. It has small warts, and black and red-brown crown tufts. Male's skulls are usually larger than females. It was described in 1897 by Charles Immanuel Forsyth Major, a Swiss zoologist-physician.
- S. p. oliveri, from Mindoro, was described more recently in 2008 by Colin Groves, a biologist-anthropologist. The description was done based on a collection of three skulls and part of a skin. They have "straw-coloured" gonial tufts, and their black crown tufts are equally mixed with straw-coloured hairs.

== Distribution and habitat ==
The Philippine warty pig is one of four species of pigs endemic to the Philippines. The other three endemic species are the Visayan warty pig (S. cebifrons), Mindoro warty pig (S. oliveri) and the Palawan bearded pig (S. ahoenobarbus), also being rare members of the family Suidae.

In general, the original distribution of S. philippensis covered the western islands of the Philippines, while the original distribution of S. cebifrons covered the central and eastern islands. Specifically, the range of Philippine warty pigs included Luzon, Biliran, Samar, Leyte, Mindoro, Mindanao, Jolo, Polillo, Catanduanes, and possibly other islands. They are known to be locally extinct from Marinduque.

Wild pigs have been reported in Bohol and Sibuyan, although it is unclear whether these populations are S. cebifrons or S. philippensis. In April 2022, a Philippine warty pig was documented by a Department of Environment and Natural Resources (DENR) team while climbing Mount Apo.

== Ecology and behaviour ==
However, its present distribution is declining and subject to severe fragmentation. Moreover, it was formerly found in most habitats (from sea level to up to 2800 m) but is now confined to remote forests due to habitat disruption and fragmentation, heavy hunting, and attacks of African swine fever, a potentially fatal viral fever. Wild pig meat in the Philippines can fetch more than twice the price of domestic pig meat.

Usage of camera traps has suggested that the pigs prefer open, as opposed to canopied, habitat areas. Further evidence also suggested they do well in more open areas, near clearings or farms, and even inhabit banana plantations.

A 2022 paper noted that the pigs act as "ecosystem engineers" in that they reshape and influence their ecosystems. The pigs are known to help disperse seeds and influence plant growth and soil erosion. They are mostly nocturnal animals in areas where humans have disrupted the land.

Little is known about the pigs' reproduction; however, in general, Suidae have between one and twelve babies in a den, which the piglets leave after about ten days. They reach sexual maturity after around 18 months. One generation of pigs generally spans seven years.

== Hybridization ==
Due to loss of its natural habitat from human disruption, the Philippine warty pigs come into close contact with domestic pigs – the domesticated variety of the foreign Eurasian wild boar. Genetic pollution of the Philippine warty pig populations is a major problem, as is hybridization between the two species.

== See also ==
- Wild pigs of the Philippines
