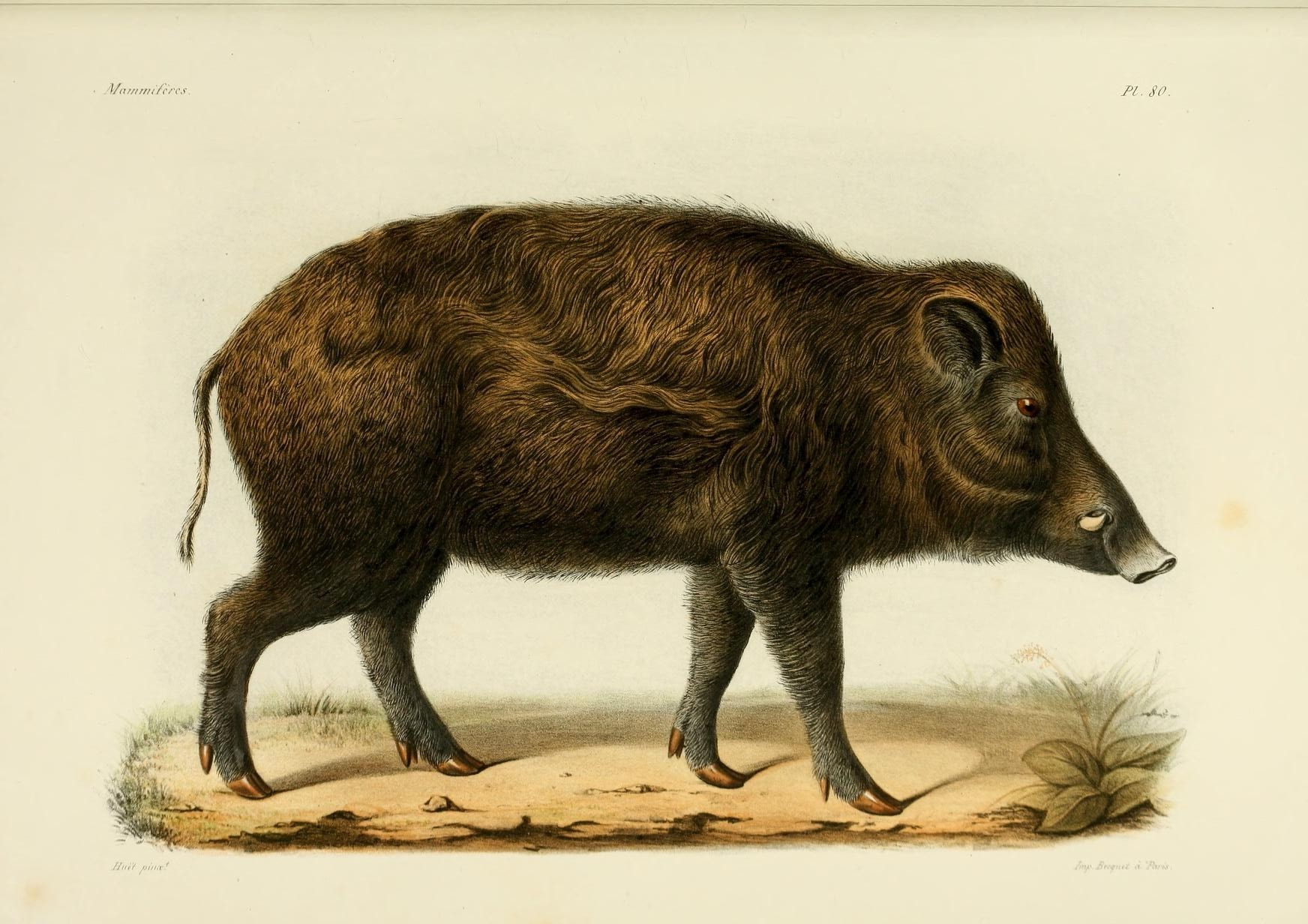

Scientific classification
- Kingdom: Animalia
- Phylum: Chordata
- Class: Mammalia
- Order: Artiodactyla
- Family: Suidae
- Genus: Sus
- Species: S. scrofa
- Subspecies: S. s. moupinensis

Trinomial name
- Sus scrofa moupinensis Milne-Edwards, 1871

Synonyms
- Species synonymy: acrocranius (Heude, 1892); chirodontus (Heude, 1888); chirodonticus (Heude, 1899); collinus (Heude, 1892); curtidens (Heude, 1892); dicrurus (Heude, 1888); flavescens (Heude, 1899); frontosus (Heude, 1892); laticeps (Heude, 1892); leucorhinus (Heude, 1888); melas (Heude, 1892); microdontus (Heude, 1892); oxyodontus (Heude, 1888); paludosus (Heude, 1892); palustris (Heude, 1888); planiceps (Heude, 1892); scrofoides (Heude, 1892); spatharius (Heude, 1892); taininensis (Heude,1888)

= Northern Chinese boar =

Subspecies of mammal

The northern Chinese boar (Sus scrofa moupinensis) is a subspecies of wild boar native to China and Vietnam. The subspecies was described by Alphonse Milne-Edwards in 1871. It also occurs in Sichuan. It is likely to be the ancestor of domestic pigs in China.
