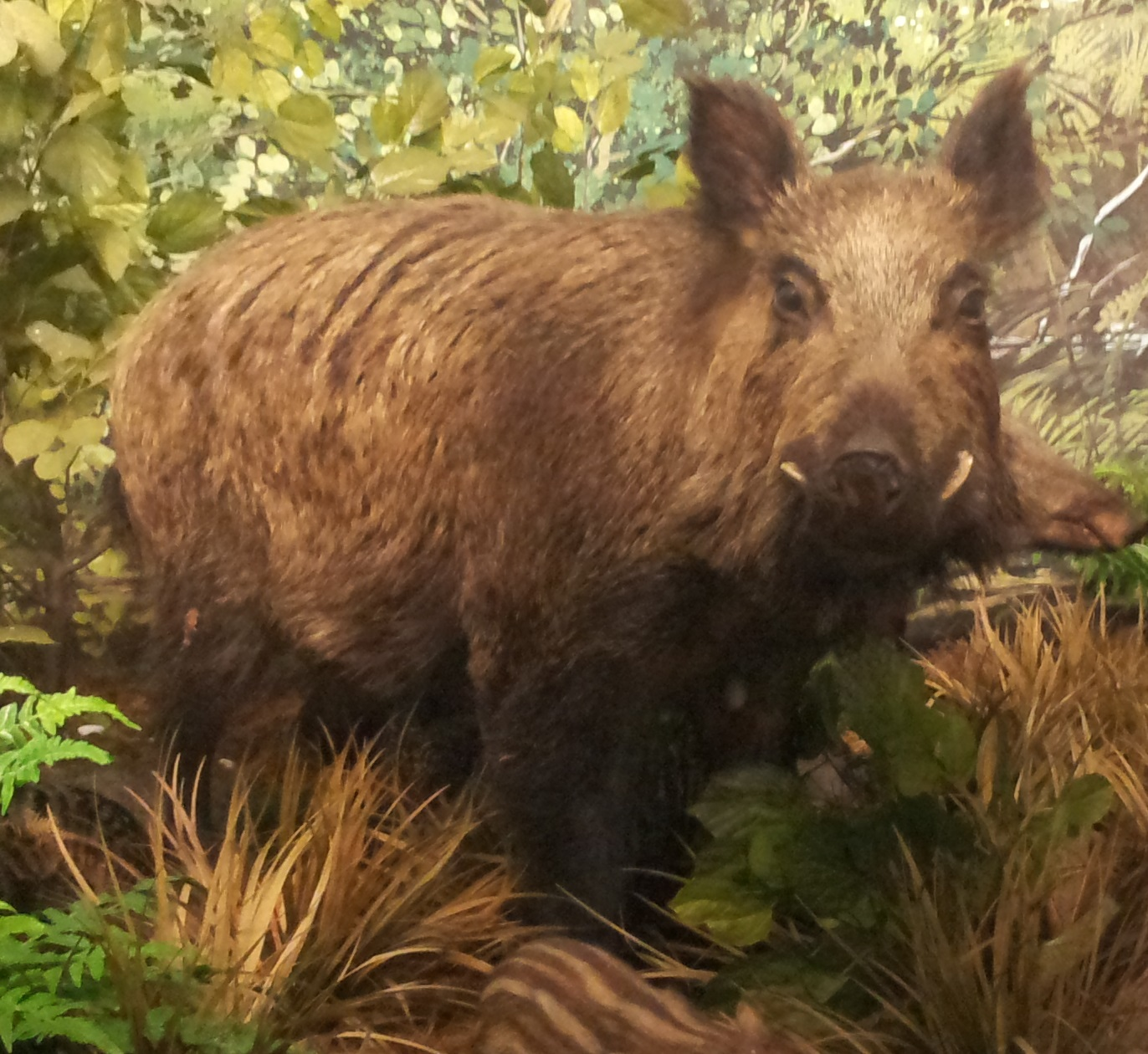

Scientific classification
- Kingdom: Animalia
- Phylum: Chordata
- Class: Mammalia
- Order: Artiodactyla
- Family: Suidae
- Genus: Sus
- Species: S. scrofa
- Subspecies: S. s. majori

Trinomial name
- Sus scrofa majori de Beaux and Festa, 1927

= Maremman boar =

Subspecies of mammal

The Maremman boar (Sus scrofa majori) is a subspecies of wild boar native to Maremma in Central Italy. It is much smaller than the Central European boar and the two subspecies have been interbred on farms.

Genetic studies (Larson et al. 2005) have confirmed that this taxon is a separate lineage from all other European wild boars.
