= Warthog (disambiguation) =

A warthog is a wild member in the genus Phacochoerus that lives in Africa. It consists of 2 species:

- Common warthog Phacochoerus africanus
- Desert warthog Phacochoerus aethiopicus

It may also refer to:

- A-10 Warthog, or Fairchild Republic A-10 Thunderbolt II, a United States Air Force aircraft
- Warthog (Halo), a vehicle in the fictional Halo universe
- Warthog Games, an English video game studio
- Winston-Salem Warthogs, the name from 1995 to 2008 of the Winston-Salem Dash
- "Warthog", service name used by British military for the UK version of Bronco All Terrain Tracked Carrier
- "Wart Hog", a song by punk rock group The Ramones, on their album Too Tough to Die
- Warthogs, nickname of the Harare International School teams

== See also ==
- "Warty Warthog", the code name for the first release (version 4.10) of Ubuntu Linux
- Warty pig (disambiguation)
- Wonder Wart-Hog
- Hogwarts
