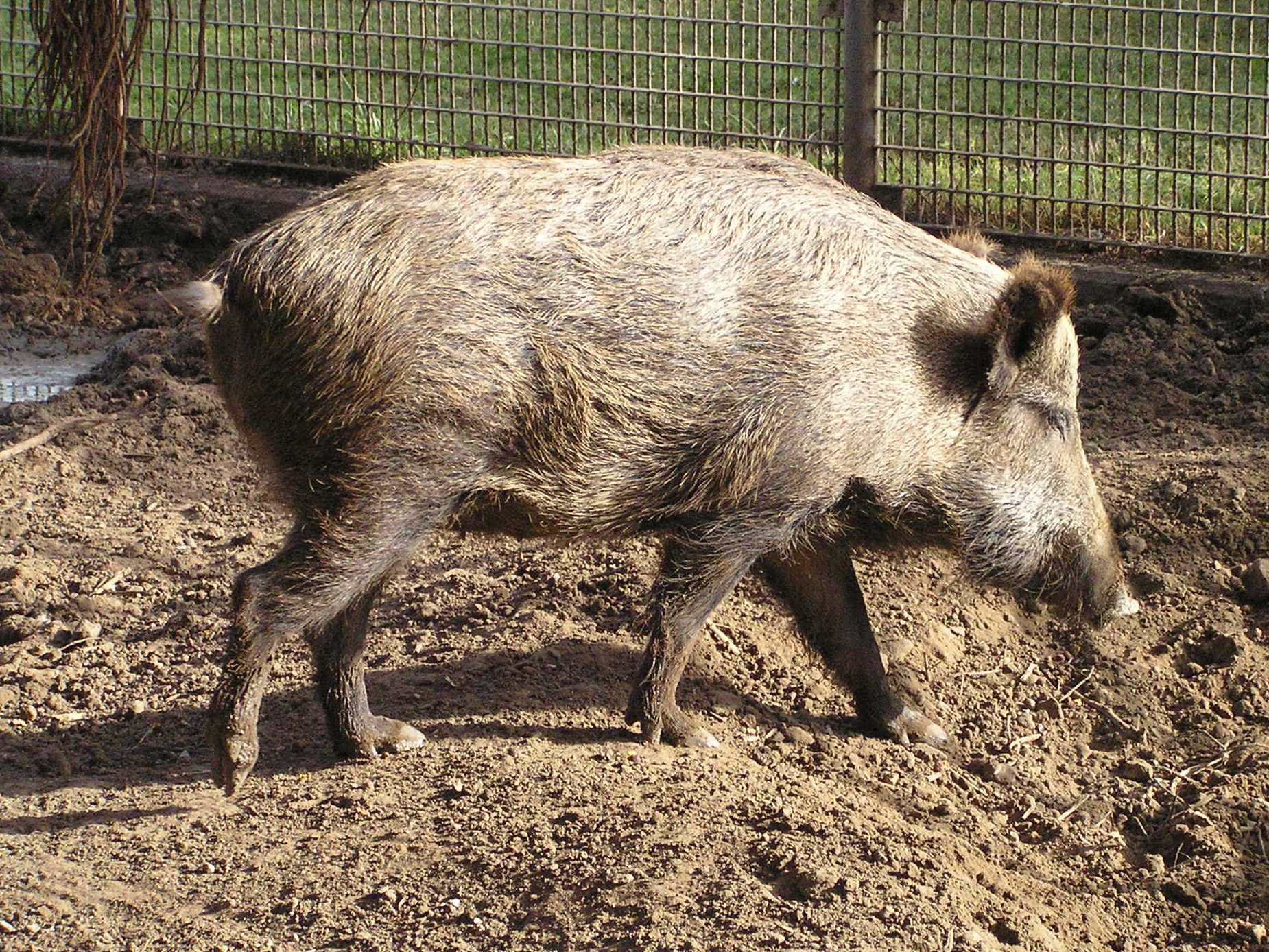

Scientific classification
- Kingdom: Animalia
- Phylum: Chordata
- Class: Mammalia
- Order: Artiodactyla
- Family: Suidae
- Genus: Sus
- Species: S. scrofa
- Subspecies: S. s. libycus

Trinomial name
- Sus scrofa libycus Gray, 1868

Synonyms
- Species synonymy: lybicus (Groves, 1981); mediterraneus (Ulmansky, 1911); reiseri (Bolkay, 1925)

= Anatolian boar =

Subspecies of wild boar

The Anatolian boar (Sus scrofa libycus) is a subspecies of wild boar endemic to Turkey, Levant, and Transcaucasia. It is likely to be one of the ancestors of today's domestic pigs.
