= Timor warty pig =

Scientific classification
- Kingdom: Animalia
- Phylum: Chordata
- Class: Mammalia
- Order: Artiodactyla
- Family: Suidae
- Genus: Sus
- Species: S. celebensis
- Subspecies: S. c. timoriensis

Trinomial name
- Sus celebensis timoriensis Müller and Schlegel, 1845

Subspecies of mammal

The Timor warty pig (Sus celebensis timoriensis) is a subspecies of Sus celebensis, or Celebes warty pig. Though described as a separate species, it is a feral form of the Celebes warty pig found in the Lesser Sunda Islands.

== Sources ==
- Ultimate Ungulate
