= Flores warty pig =

Scientific classification
- Kingdom: Animalia
- Phylum: Chordata
- Class: Mammalia
- Order: Artiodactyla
- Family: Suidae
- Genus: Sus
- Species: S. celebensis
- Subspecies: S. c. floresianus

Trinomial name
- Sus celebensis floresianus (Heude, 1899)

Synonyms
- Sus heureni Hardjasasmita, 1987

Species of mammal

The Flores warty pig (Sus celebensis floresianus), is a subspecies in the pig genus (Sus) found in southern Asia.
