= Pig Olympics =

Sport event for pigs

The Pig Olympics is a sports contest for specially bred and trained piglets. The competition is organized by the Sport-Pig Federation, which boasts of over 100 members.

Events within the competition include pig-racing (over an obstacle course), pig swimming (introduced at the 2006 Pig Olympics), and 'pigball' or 'swineball' which is much like football or soccer.

The "pig-letes" in the games are not eaten, instead, they are bred for the next generation of piglet athletes.

The 2005 Pig Olympics were held in China and the 2006 games were held in Moscow, Russia. The last Pig Olympics were in 2009 in St. Louis.
