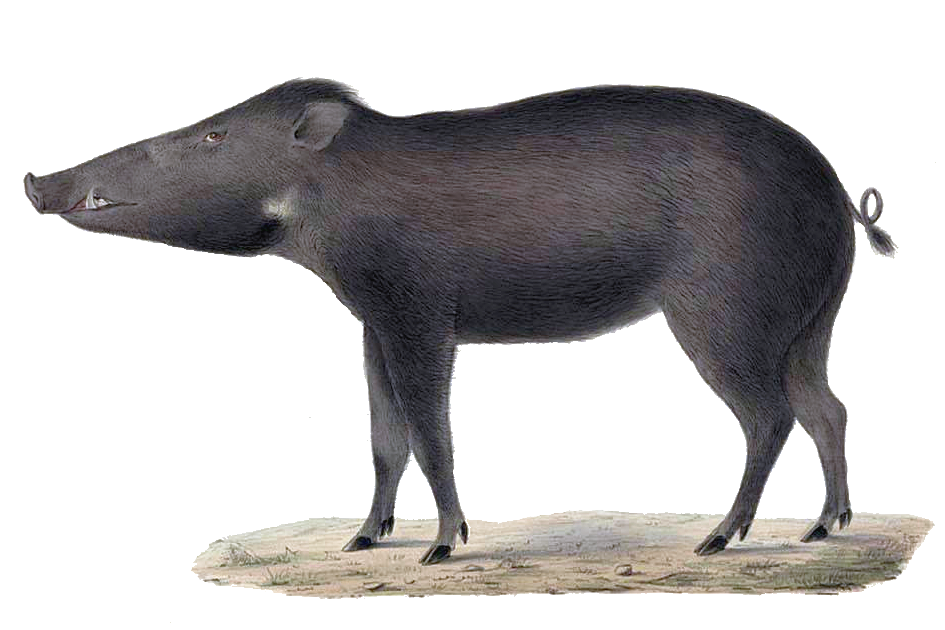
- Illustration

Conservation status
- Near Threatened (IUCN 3.1)

Scientific classification
- Kingdom: Animalia
- Phylum: Chordata
- Class: Mammalia
- Order: Artiodactyla
- Family: Suidae
- Genus: Sus
- Species: S. celebensis

Binomial name
- Sus celebensis S. Müller & Schlegel, 1843

Subspecies
- Sus celebensis celebensis; Sus celebensis floresianus; Sus celebensis timoriensis

Synonyms
- Verrucophorus celebensis

= Celebes warty pig =

Sulawesi warty pig

Species of pig

The Celebes warty pig (Sus celebensis), also called Sulawesi warty pig or Sulawesi pig, is a species in the pig genus (Sus) that lives on Sulawesi in Indonesia. It survives in most habitats and can live in altitudes of up to 2,500 m (8,000 ft). It has been domesticated and introduced to a number of other islands in Indonesia.

== Description ==
The Celebes warty pig is a medium-sized pig, and quite variable in size and appearance. Although a number of subspecies have been recognised, it is now regarded as a monotypic taxon. It is the only pig species that has been domesticated apart from the wild boar; being semi-domesticated may have had an influence on the variability of its appearance. This pig has a head-and-body length of between 80 and 130 cm (30 and 50 in) and a long tail, with males generally being larger than females. The back is rounded and the legs short. The colour is greyish-black, sometimes tinged with red or yellow on the flanks. There are three pairs of facial warts and a fringe of pale bristles on the snout and more bristles on the cheeks. The crown and nape are topped by a short crest of dark bristles, while a dark mid-dorsal stripe extends from the crest towards the tufted tail. Young pigs have longitudinal stripes, but these fade as the piglets grow.

== Distribution and habitat ==
The Celebes warty pig occurs in Sulawesi, being plentiful in central, eastern and south-eastern parts of the island but uncommon in the northeastern and southern parts. It also occurs naturally on the nearby smaller islands of Buton, Muna, Kabeana, Peleng, Lembeh and the Togian Islands. Besides this, it has been domesticated and introduced to various other islands, has hybridised with Sus scrofa, and has become feral in some places, giving rise to a number of different pig populations. It inhabits various habitat types including rainforest, swamp, cultivated land and grassland, at altitudes up to 2,500 m (8,000 ft).

== Ecology ==
This pig tends to move around in small groups of up to nine individuals, led by a dominant male and including several females and their offspring. Foraging takes place mainly in the early morning and the evening; the diet consists mainly of roots, shoots, leaves and fallen fruit, but also includes carrion, invertebrates and small vertebrates. Breeding takes place throughout the year. Gestation periods are probably between four and five months, and litter sizes can be up to eight, but in one study, averaged about two. Young may be eaten by reticulated pythons or saltwater crocodiles.

== Conservation status ==
The chief threats faced by this pig are an expanding human population, deforestation, with conversion of the land to agricultural use, and hunting for human consumption. Even in areas such as national parks, where the species is protected, hunting still occurs and the meat is traded in local markets. This over-hunting and loss of habitat has led the International Union for Conservation of Nature to assess the pig's conservation status as being "near threatened".

== Cave art ==
A cave painting of a Celebes warty pig in the Leang Tedongnge cave on Sulawesi has been dated to an age of at least 45,500 years ago, making it the oldest known representational cave painting. A layer of calcite over the painting was dated using uranium-series isotope dating to give a minimum age for the painting. The image was made using red ochre, and is accompanied by images of human hands made by blowing ochre on to the cave wall around the hands. The painting depicts a male pig, including the male's pair of facial warts. It was first seen by Westerners in 2017.

== Geology ==
At one point in time there may have been a portion of the land which shifted upward resulted in increased diversification. The researchers found out that the Sulawesi who roam the island today were preceded by other ancestors who once expanded from the innermost area of the island to the outermost part of it.
