= Cebu warty pig =

Sus cebifrons cebifrons

Conservation status
- Extinct (2000) (IUCN 3.1)

Scientific classification
- Kingdom: Animalia
- Phylum: Chordata
- Class: Mammalia
- Order: Artiodactyla
- Family: Suidae
- Genus: Sus
- Species: S. cebifrons
- Subspecies: †S. c. cebifrons

Trinomial name
- †Sus cebifrons cebifrons Heude, 1888

Extinct subspecies of mammal

The Cebu warty pig (Sus cebifrons cebifrons) is an extinct subspecies of Visayan warty pig that previously lived in Cebu, Philippines, before becoming extinct in modern times, primarily due to habitat destruction. This pig was assessed to be extinct in 2000.

The main species, Sus cebifrons, the Visayan warty pig, still found in the Philippines, is itself facing extinction.
