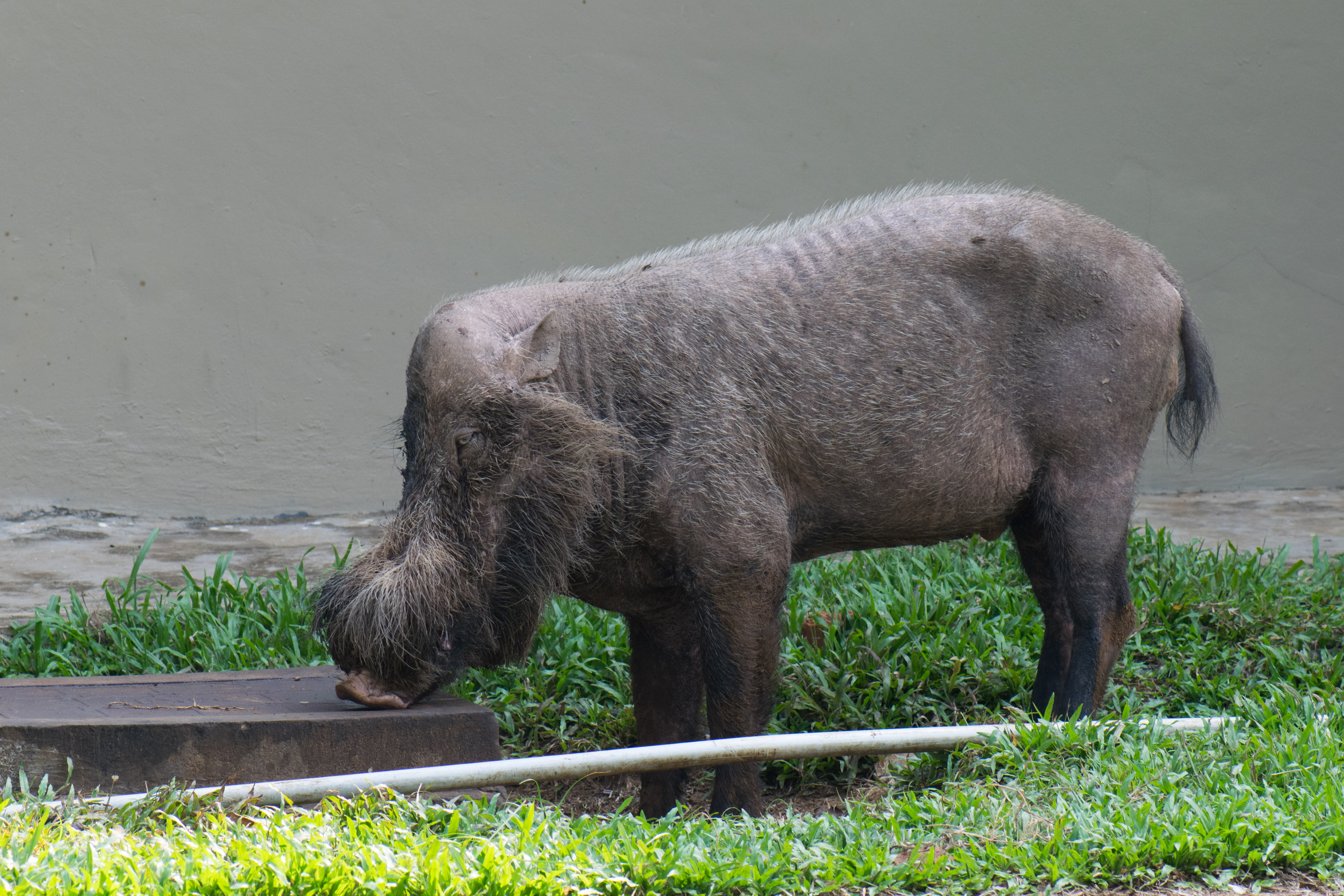
- Male
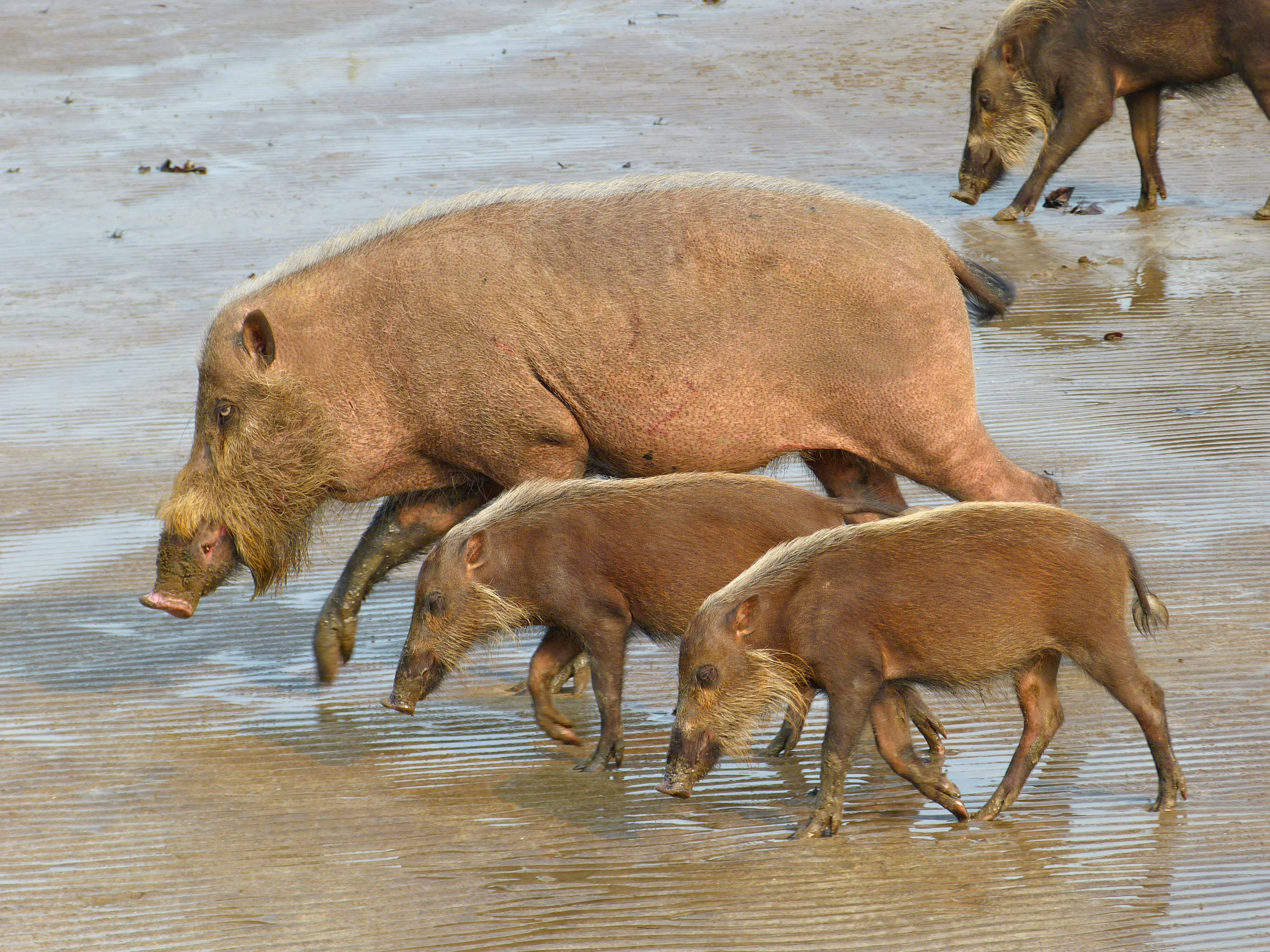
- Female and juveniles Both photographed at Bako National Park, Sarawak

Conservation status
- Vulnerable (IUCN 3.1)

Scientific classification
- Kingdom: Animalia
- Phylum: Chordata
- Class: Mammalia
- Infraclass: Placentalia
- Order: Artiodactyla
- Family: Suidae
- Genus: Sus
- Species: S. barbatus

Binomial name
- Sus barbatus S. Müller, 1838

Subspecies
- S. b. barbatus S. b. oi
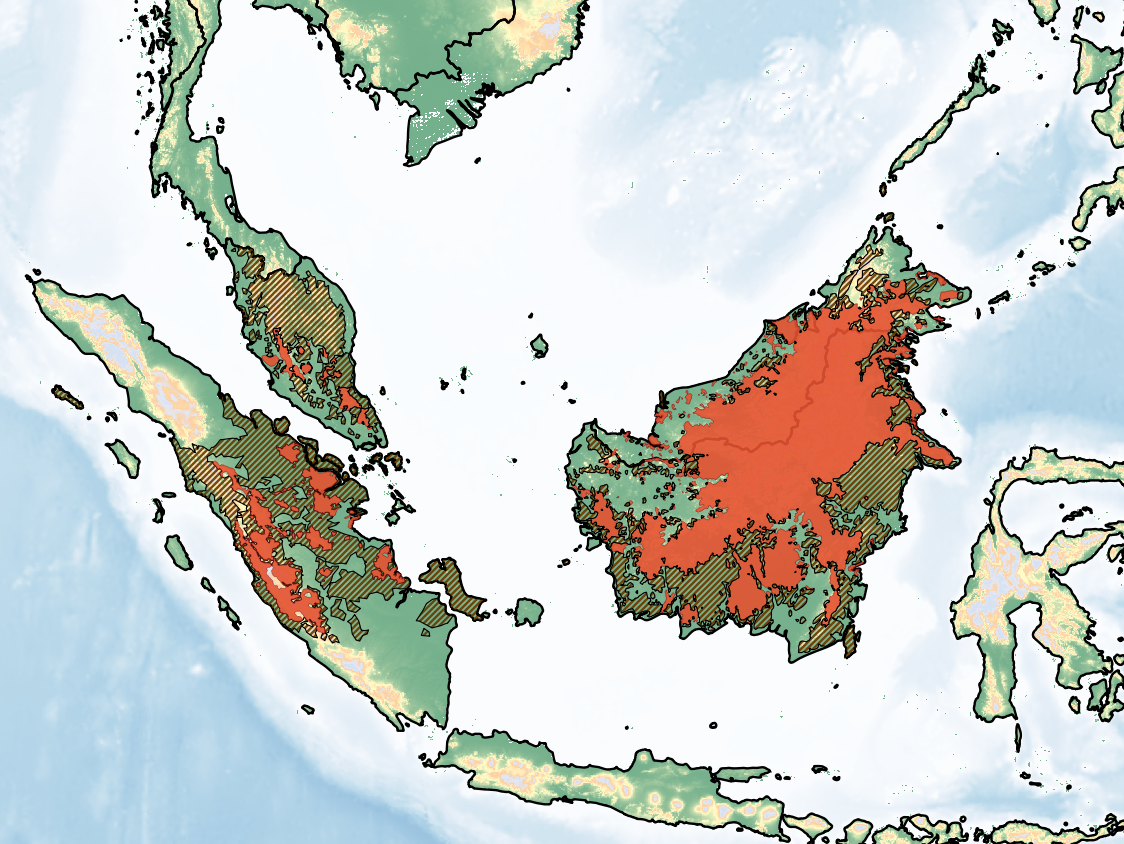

Synonyms
- Chaetorhinus barbatus

= Bornean bearded pig =

Bornean bearded pig Temporal range: Middle Pleistocene-Present

Species of mammal

The Bornean bearded pig (Sus barbatus), also known as the Sunda bearded pig or simply bearded pig, is a species in the pig genus, Sus.

It can be recognized by its prominent beard. It also sometimes has tassels on its tail. It is found in Southeast Asia—Sumatra, Borneo, the Malay Peninsula, and various smaller islands like in Sulu archipelago such as Tawi-Tawi, where it inhabits rainforests and mangrove forests. The bearded pig lives in a family. It can reproduce from the age of 18 months, and can be cross-bred with other species in the family Suidae.

Potential predators of Bornean bearded pigs in East Kalimantan include reticulated pythons. The species is also frequently hunted by the indigenous Kadazan-Dusun, Murut, and Rungus people of northern Borneo as a traditional delicacy known as the sinalau bakas (smoked wild boar meat) which is part of the pusas (snack food), sold along the main Pan Borneo Highway roads in some parts of Sabah.

== Subspecies ==
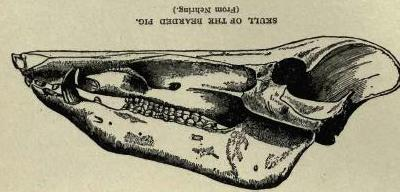
Skull

The two subspecies of this pig are:

- S. b. barbatus (the nominate subspecies)
- S. b. oi (western bearded pig)

As traditionally defined, the nominate is from Borneo. The species is widely ranging in Borneo. It is also found in Tawi-Tawi province at the tip of the Sulu Archipelago in the Philippines, although this population possibly has been extirpated, and S. b. oi is from the Malay Peninsula and Sumatra. Genetic evidence suggests this is incorrect, and S. b. oi is better limited to Sumatra, leaving bearded pigs from both Borneo and the Malay Peninsula in the nominate subspecies. Those from Bangka Island appear somewhat intermediate between the two subspecies.

The Palawan bearded pig (Sus ahoenobarbus) has formerly been considered a subspecies of the bearded pig. However, as indicated by its genetic and morphological distinctness, under the phylogenetic species concept (which does not use subspecies) it needs to be elevated to full species status; while the situation is less clear under other species concepts (as not all S. barbatus populations have been restudied in modern times), the presently available information seems to favor full species status for S. ahoenobarbus in any case.

== In captivity ==
The San Diego Zoo was the first zoo in the Western Hemisphere to breed them.

As of January 2016, it was held in the London Zoo, Berlin Zoo, Gladys Porter Zoo, National Zoo of Malaysia (Zoo Negara), Zoo Taiping, and Southwick's Zoo. The animals at Hellabrunn Zoo were euthanized in 2017 because of old age, and there is only one male left at the Berlin Zoo. Three individuals (one castrated male and two females) left at London Zoo and one individual left at Gladys Porter Zoo and the individuals were replaced by red river hogs in Southwick's Zoo as of 2017, which means that the species will likely disappear soon from European and American zoos.

The death of Neo, the last Bornean bearded pig held in Europe, was announced by Berlin zoo via Facebook on 28 February 2024.

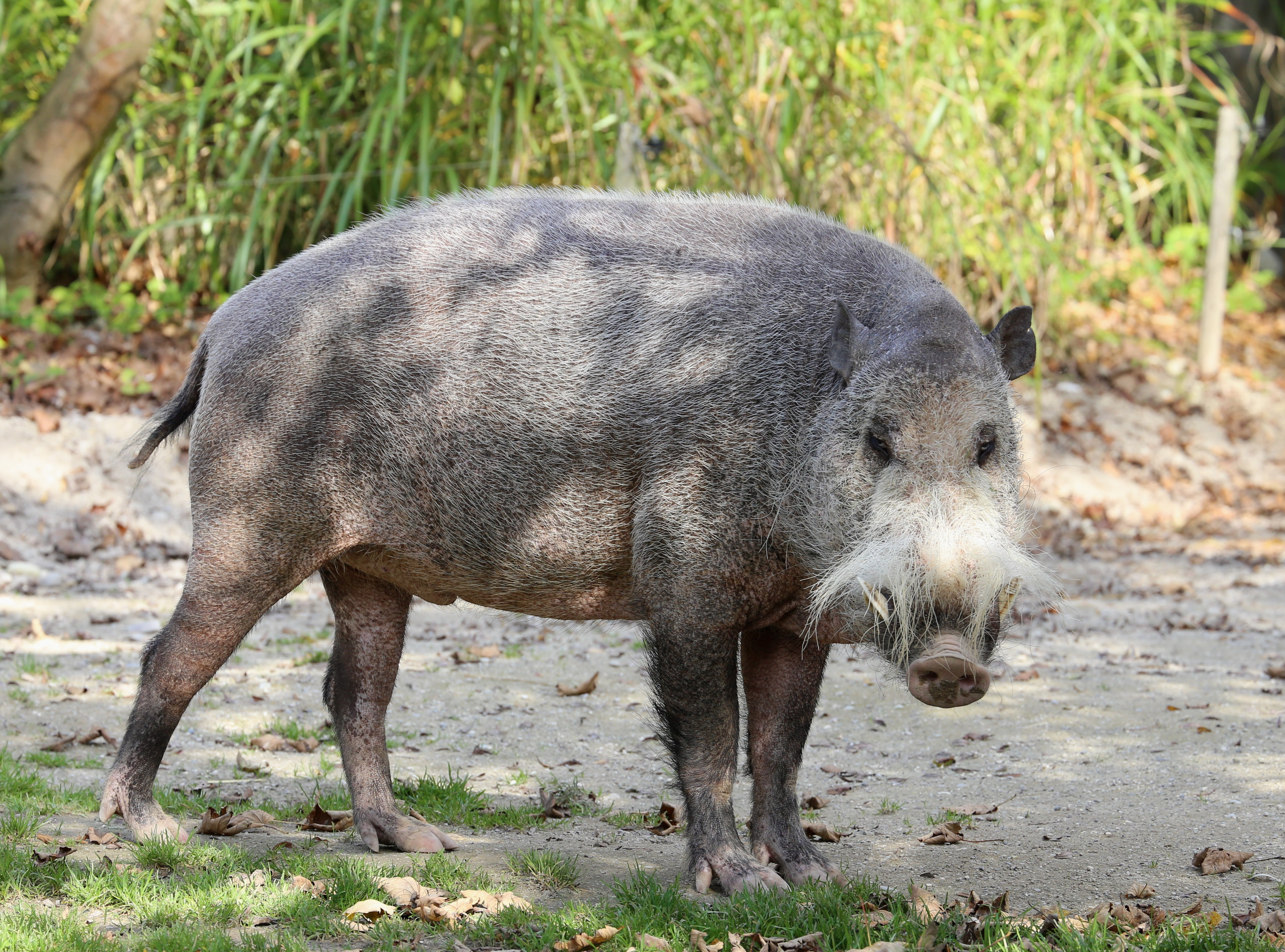
At the Hellabrunn Zoo in Munich, Germany

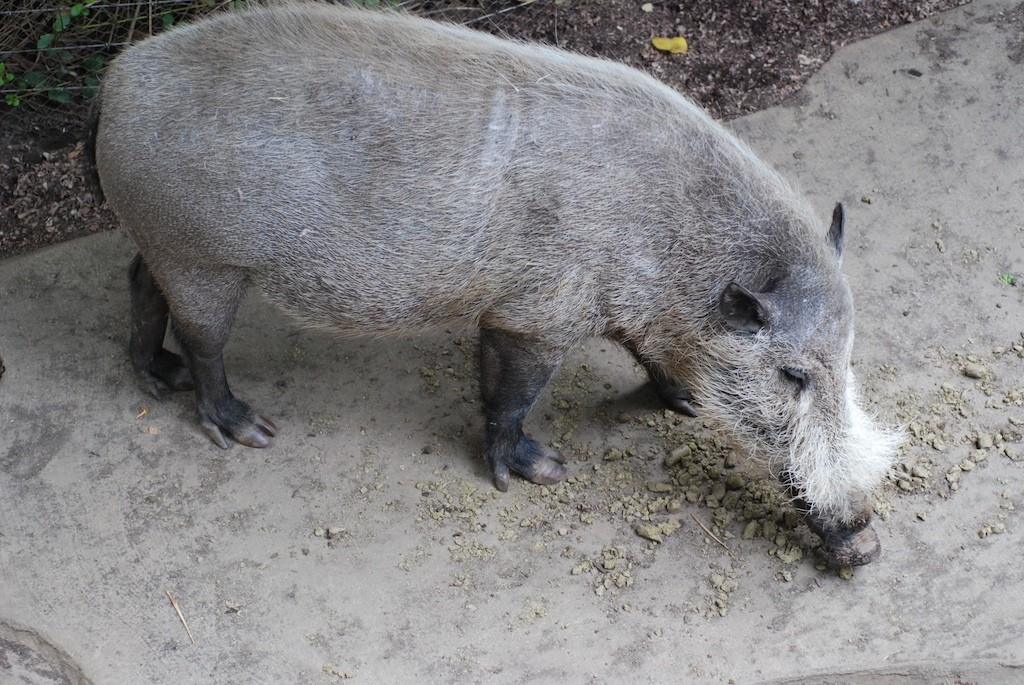
At the San Diego Zoo, the United States of America

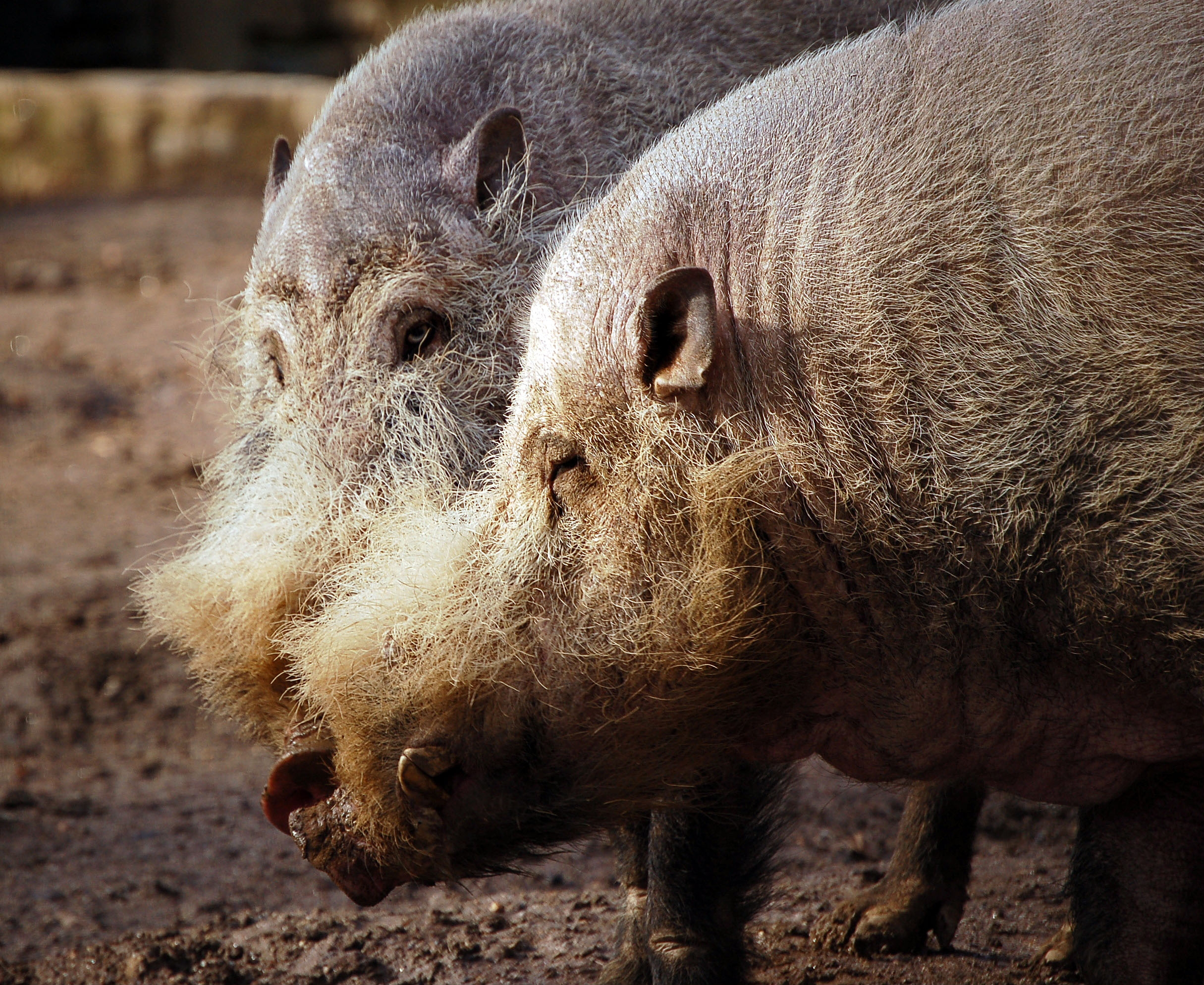
Bearded pigs at Philadelphia zoo
