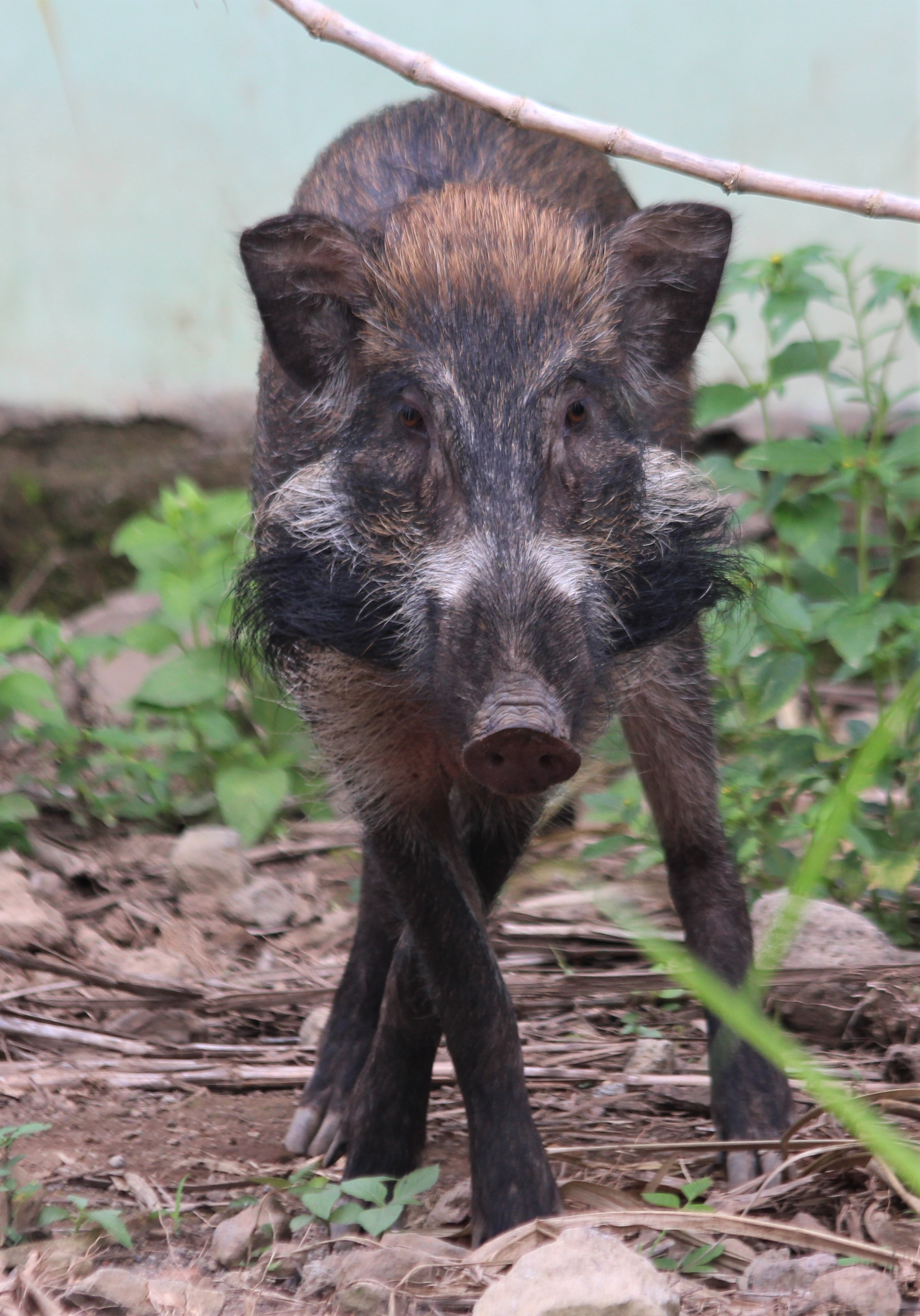

Conservation status
- Endangered (IUCN 3.1)

Scientific classification
- Kingdom: Animalia
- Phylum: Chordata
- Class: Mammalia
- Order: Artiodactyla
- Family: Suidae
- Genus: Sus
- Species: S. verrucosus

Binomial name
- Sus verrucosus Boie, 1832
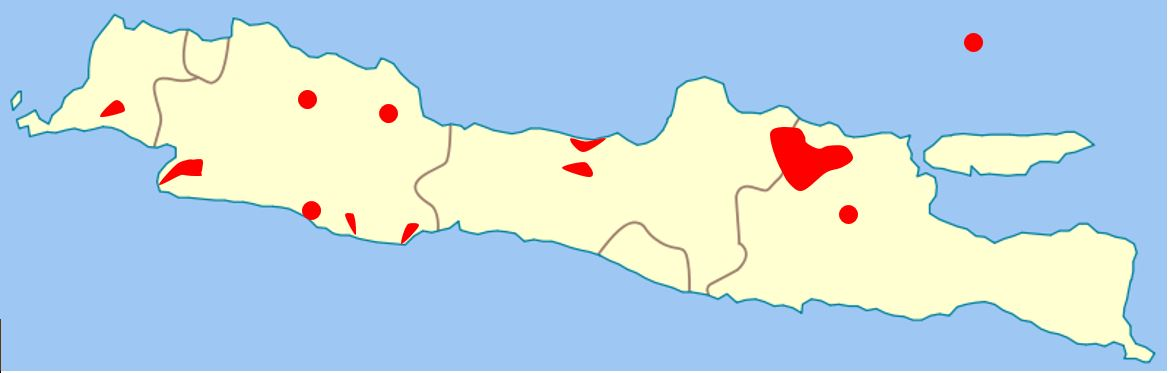
- Range map of Javan warty pig

= Javan warty pig =

Species of mammal

The Javan warty pig (Sus verrucosus), also called Javan wild pig, is an even-toed ungulate in the family Suidae. It is endemic to the Indonesian islands Java and Bawean, and is considered extinct on Madura. It is listed as Endangered on the IUCN Red List since 1996.

== Characteristics ==
The Javan warty pig is black, with some rufous parts on the head and the belly. It has three pairs of facial warts; the largest pair is below the ears, the second under each eye, and the smallest pair above the upper canines. It has a nuchal and dorsal crest that gradually becomes shorter towards the tail. Its tail does not have a terminal tuft. Young are uniformly coloured. Facial warts vary in size and grow with age. Males reach a weight of about 108.2 kg (239 lb), whereas females weigh only about 44 kg (97 lb). It is therefore the biggest suine on the island.

== Distribution and habitat ==
The Javan warty pig occurs in Leuweung Sancang Nature Reserve and Meru Betiri National Park in southern Java, Nusakambangan Nature Reserve on the Nusa Kambangan island and in a protected area on the Bawean island. It lives at elevations below 800 m (2,600 ft) in grassland and secondary forest.

== Ecology and behaviour ==
The Javan warty pig is mainly a solitary creature, but groups of three or four individuals have been sighted. It is nocturnal and crepuscular. When the warty pig is startled, its mane stands erect. If the animal is fleeing from a predator, its tail is erect and curved towards its body. When a group of individuals is frightened, the recorded alarm call sounds like a shrill whistle.

=== Reproduction ===
September to December is thought to be the mating season of the Javan warty pig. Gestation lasts four months. The piglets are born in a nest and nursed for the following three to four months. On average, the species lives to be eight years of age, with a few captive individuals living to 14 years of age.

The specific mating structure of the Javan warty pig has not been observed in the wild. A historic source from the 1940s indicated a litter size of three to nine piglets born between January and March. Between 2003 and 2005, captive Javan warty pig in Surabaya Zoo had litters of two to four piglets, born between March and August.

== Conservation ==
According to the IUCN Red List, S. verrucosus was first declared vulnerable in 1988 and listed as endangered in 1996. A drastic 53% drop in the population occurred from 1982 through 2006. The species is believed to be still declining. A recent study estimated a population of 172–377 individuals, making the Javan warty pig one of the rarest pig species. The main threat to this species is habitat encroachment by humans. Agriculture is a large influence in the decline of the Javan warty pig. These pigs are also killed by farmers who spot the pigs raiding their crops at night. Since this is a large animal, sports hunters also consider killing the animal a challenge and see it as a trophy. An interesting threat to this species is actually occurring naturally. The closest relative to Sus verrucosus is the banded pig (Sus scrofa vittatus). This species shares similar habitat ranges as the Javan pig. This species threatens the Javan pig not only through resource competition, but also by cross-mating and creating hybrids of S. verrucosus and S. scrofa.

The most recent conservation project, through the World Association of Zoos and Aquariums, aims to capture healthy Javan warty pigs and breed them in captivity. The offspring of this program are then supposed to be released into protected habitats. This method of reintroduction of the offspring will ensure the long-term survival of the species. One of the problems with this project is finding true S. verrucosus, not hybrids, which brings up another goal of the program, molecular mapping. Scientists will extract DNA from the wild pigs and record their genetic code to separate hybrids from true S. verrucosus. Along with this project are plans to educate the locals about the importance and endangerment of this species. The locals sometimes comment that they cannot distinguish the banded pig from the Javan pig, and with education, this confusion can be reduced.
