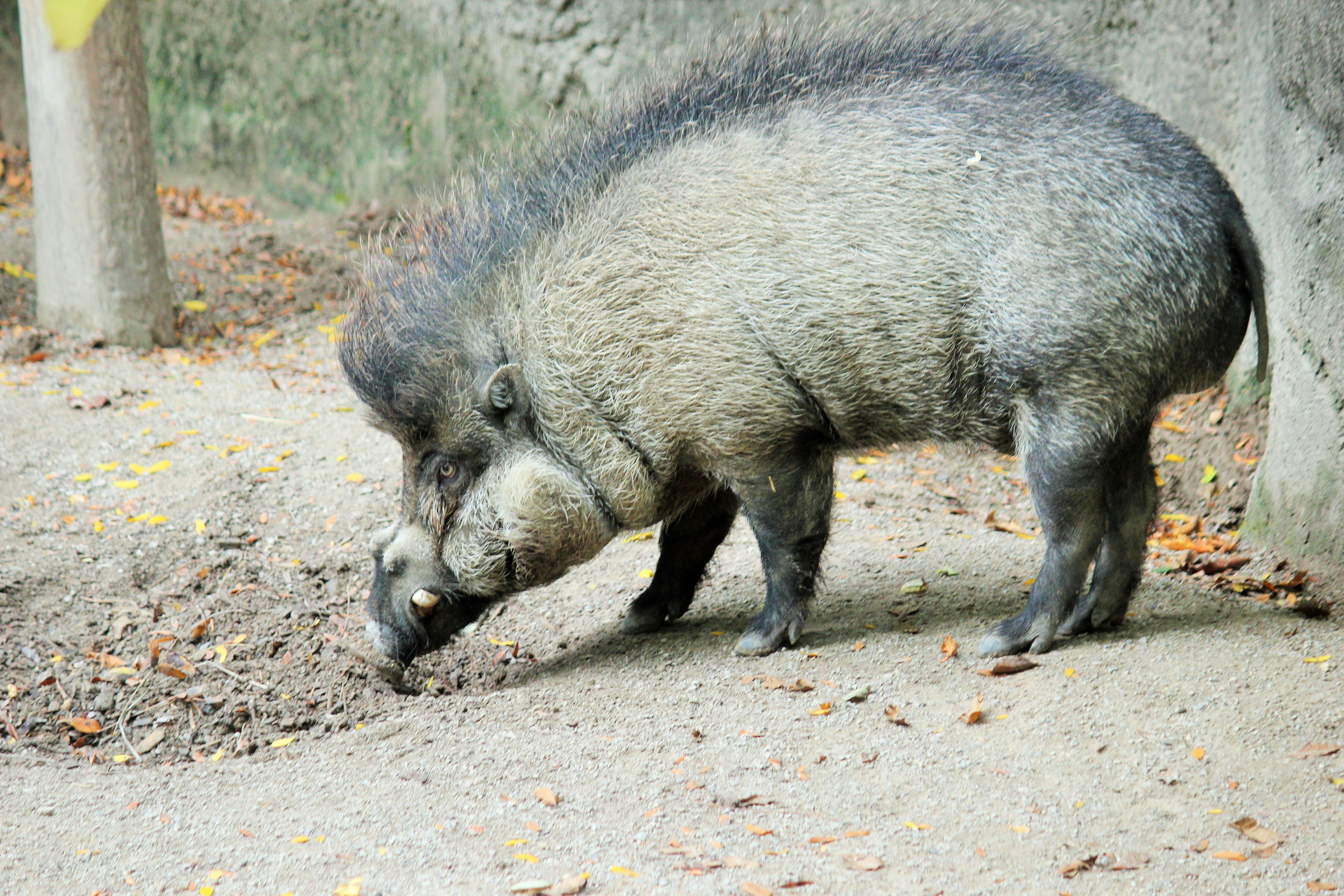
- A Visayan warty pig at Cincinnati Zoo, Ohio

Conservation status
- Critically Endangered (IUCN 3.1)

Scientific classification
- Kingdom: Animalia
- Phylum: Chordata
- Class: Mammalia
- Order: Artiodactyla
- Family: Suidae
- Genus: Sus
- Species: S. cebifrons

Binomial name
- Sus cebifrons Heude, 1888
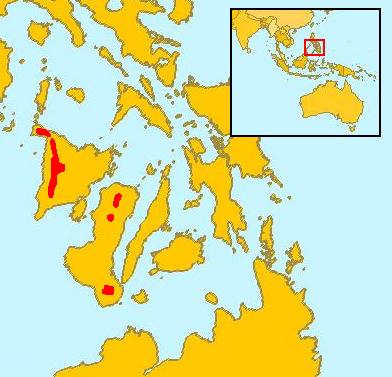
- Geographic range of Sus cebifrons

Synonyms
- Verrucophorus cebifrons

= Visayan warty pig =

Species of mammal

The Visayan warty pig (Sus cebifrons) is a critically endangered species in the pig genus (Sus). It is endemic to six of the Visayan Islands (Cebu, Negros, Panay, Masbate, Guimaras, and Siquijor) in the central Philippines. It is known by many names in the region (depending on the island and linguistic group) with most translating into 'wild pig': baboy ilahas ('wild pig' in Hiligaynon, Cebuano and Waray), baboy talonon ('forest pig' in Hiligaynon), baboy sulop ('dark pig' in Cebuano), and baboy ramo ('wild boar' in Waray).

The Visayan warty pig is critically endangered due to habitat loss and hunting. It is believed to be extinct in four of the islands in its original native range, with only small surviving populations in Negros and Panay. Due to the small numbers of remaining Visayan warty pigs in the wild, little is known of their behaviors or characteristics outside of captivity. In 2012, the Negros Interior Biodiversity Expedition undertook camera trapping in the Northern Negros Natural Park and gained the first photos taken in the wild of the Visayan warty pig.

== Distribution ==
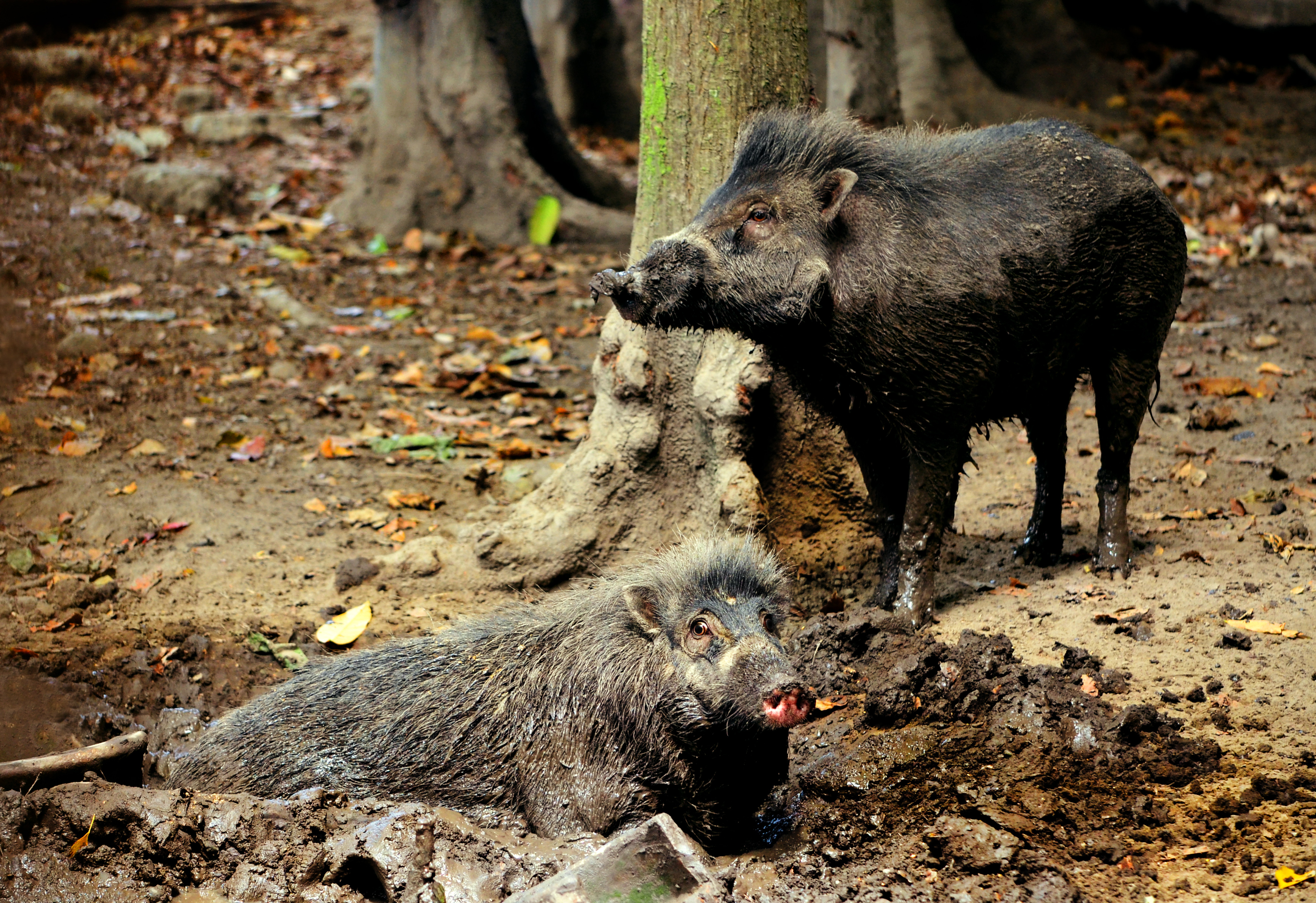
A pair of Visayan Warty Pigs photographed at a wallow on the island of Negros in the Philippines.

The Visayan warty pig is endemic to six islands in the Philippines: Cebu, Negros, Panay, Masbate, Guimaras, and Siquijor. However, only Negros and Panay have documented remaining populations of Visayan warty pigs. It is believed to be extinct in all the other islands, although there is a possibility of some surviving populations in Masbate.

== Subspecies ==
The species includes the following subspecies:

- Cebu warty pig (Sus cebifrons cebifrons) (believed to be extinct);
- Negros warty pig (Sus cebifrons negrinus). There are two separate remaining populations and died of S. c. negrinus – on the islands of Negros and Panay, respectively. Both populations have been physically and genetically isolated since the last ice age (c. 12,000 yrs).

== Physical characteristics ==
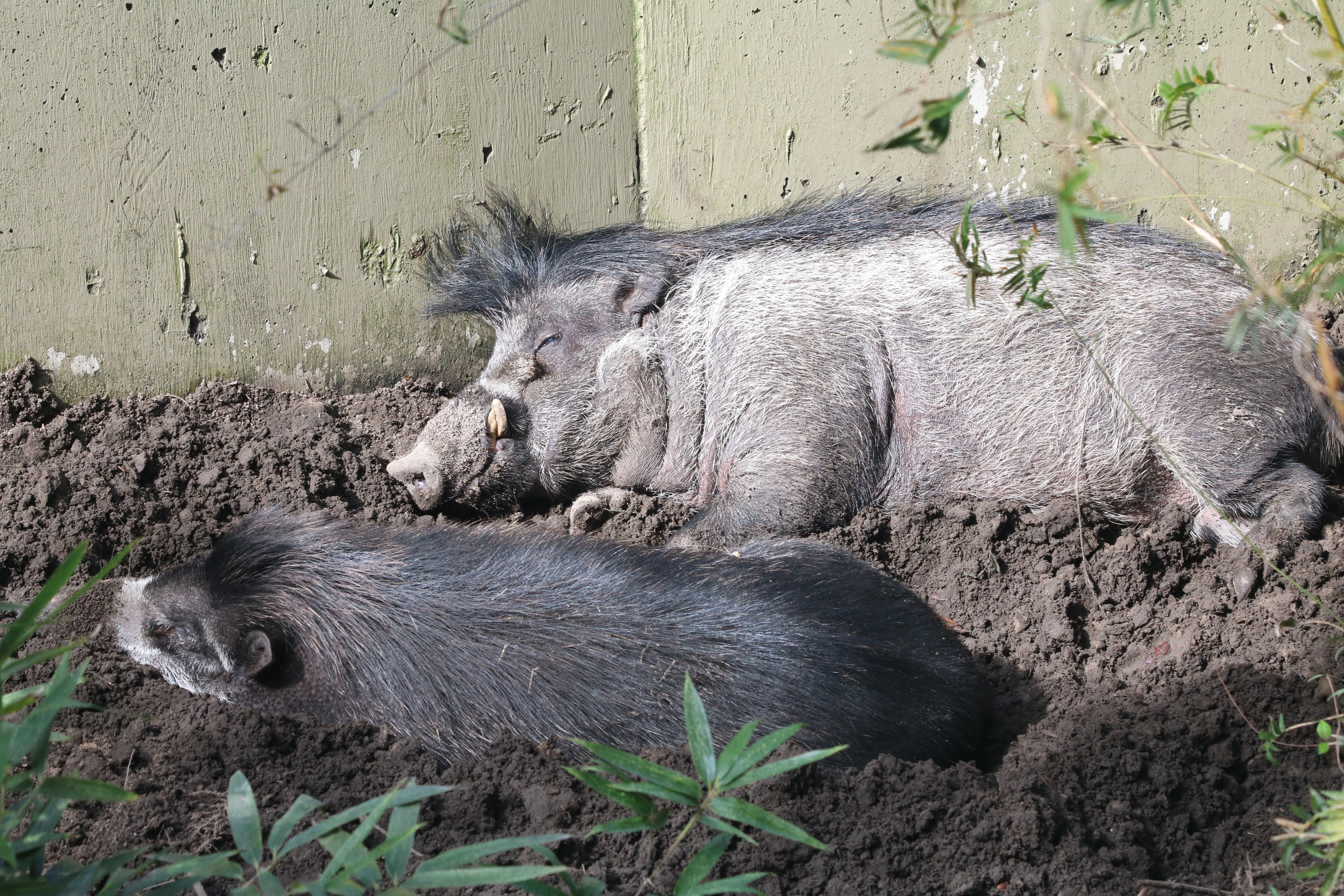
A pair of Visayan warty pigs resting at Lowry Park Zoo in Tampa, Florida.

The Visayan warty pig receives its name from the three pairs of fleshy "warts" present on the visage of the boar. Biologists speculate that the reason for the warts is to assist as a natural defense against the tusks of rival pigs during a fight. The boars also grow stiff spiky hair.

== Behavior and diet ==
Visayan warty pigs tend to live in groups of four to six. The diet of the pig mainly consists of roots, tubers, and fruits that can be found in the forest. They may also eat cultivated crops. Since approximately 95% of their natural habitat has been cleared by local farmers who cut down the forest to plant crops, the propensity of the pigs to eat cultivated crops has risen dramatically. Because the land that is cleared for farming is often unproductive after a few years, the food sources of the Visayan warty pig are extremely limited, a factor that has contributed significantly to the pig's dwindling numbers.

Visayan warty pigs were the first pig species ever to be recorded using tools for digging at a French zoo.

== Reproduction ==
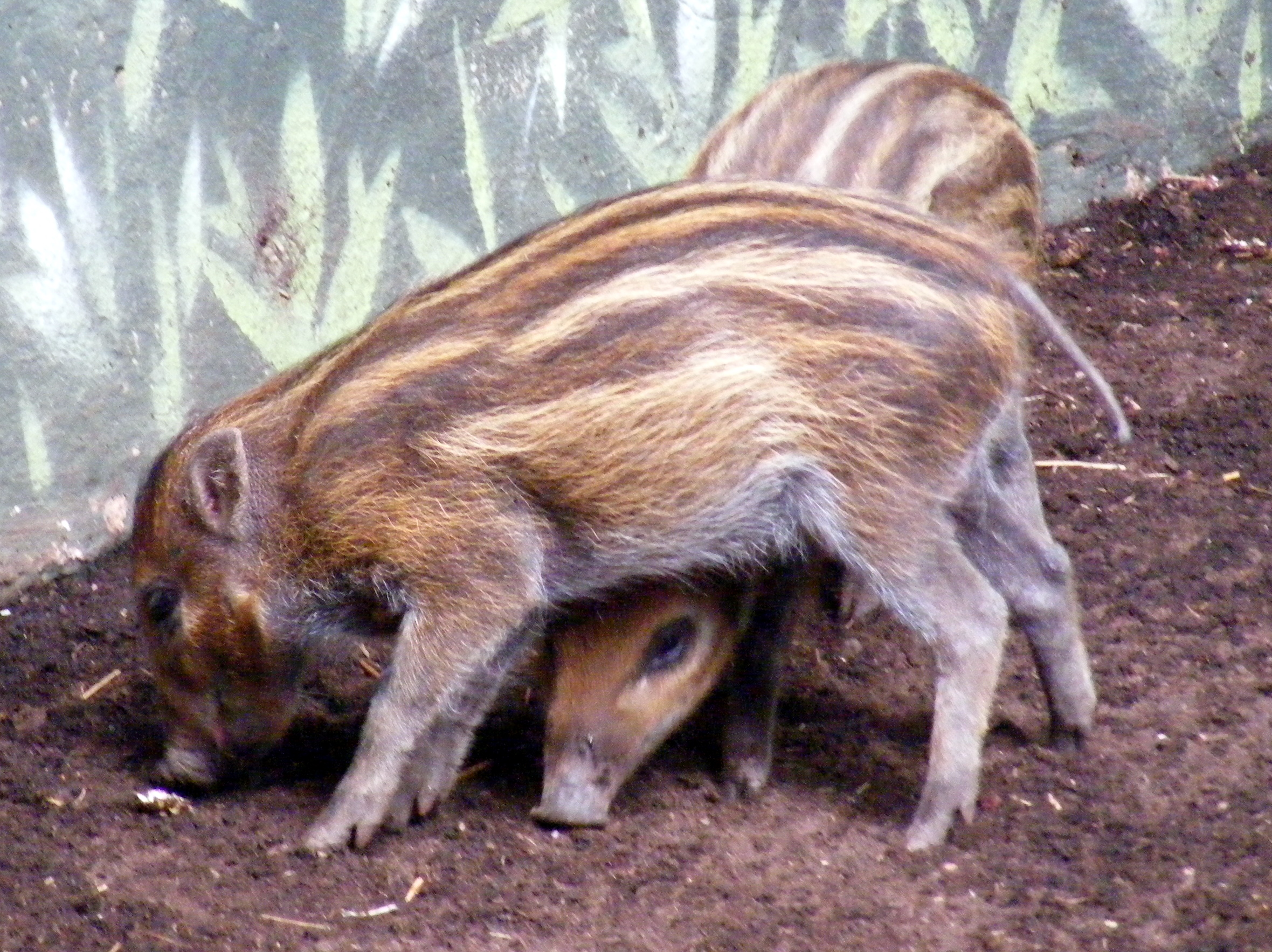
Visayan warty pig piglets, Sus cebifrons.

Visayan warty pig piglets are often seen during the dry season between the months of January and March in their native habitat of the western Visayan Islands. The mean number of piglets is three to four per litter. There is at least one case of male-led infanticide documented in captivity.

== Conservation ==
The biggest threat to the Visayan warty pig is habitat loss caused by commercial logging and slash-and-burn farming. In total, it is extinct in 98% of its original native range due to loss of forest cover. They are also hunted for food; and by farmers who see them as pests since they can damage crops when foraging.

Visayan warty pigs are also vulnerable to genetic contamination, as they readily hybridize with feral domestic pigs.

=== Breeding programs ===
The current conservation program for S. c. negrinus includes successful breeding programs at the Rotterdam Zoo for pigs of Negros origin, and at the San Diego Zoo for pigs of Panay origin.

=== Captive populations ===
In addition to a few other conservation programs in the Philippines, the Crocolandia Foundation and the Negros Forests and Ecological Foundation both have this species in captivity. In Europe, 32 zoos – Jersey Zoo, Rotterdam Zoo, Planckendael Zoo, Poznan Zoo, Colchester Zoo, Chester Zoo, Belfast Zoo, Edinburgh Zoo, Yorkshire Wildlife Park, Blackbrook Zoological Park, Děčín Zoo, Ostrava Zoo, Newquay Zoo, and Parken Zoo in Eskilstuna, among others – maintain the Negros Island variety of this species. Moreover, several zoos in the United States also maintain the species. The San Diego Zoo was the first zoo outside the Philippines to keep and breed Visayan warty pigs. Elsewhere in North America, zoos in Seattle, Los Angeles, Portland, Phoenix, Tucson, Miami, Tampa, Saint Louis, Attleboro, Melbourne, Gainesville, Jacksonville, Boise, Cincinnati, and Apple Valley have also kept the species. The Pittsburgh Zoo & PPG Aquarium have acquired the species and they went on-show to the public in June 2015. The Austin Zoo also exhibits this species.

== See also ==
- Wild pigs of the Philippines
