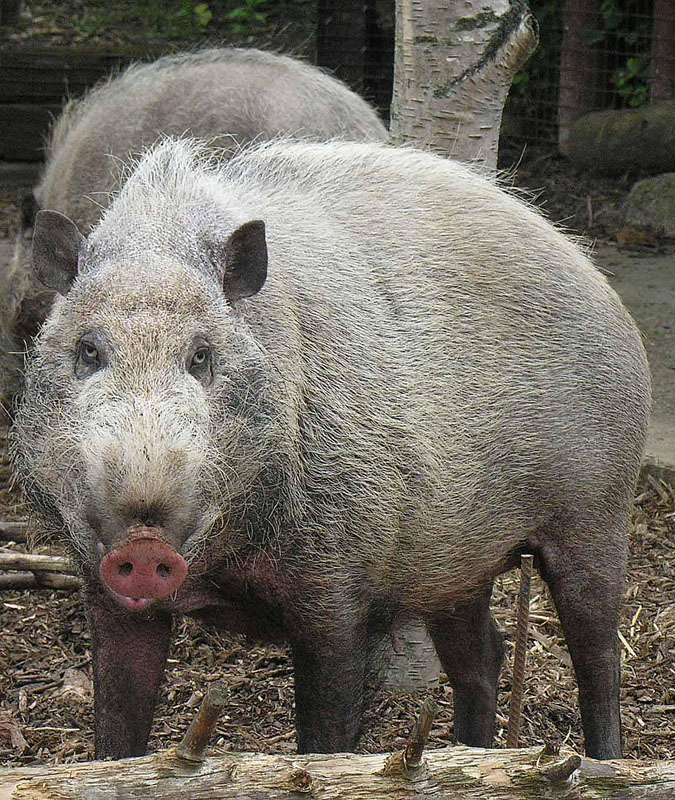
- Bornean bearded pig (Sus barbatus)

Scientific classification
- Kingdom: Animalia
- Phylum: Chordata
- Class: Mammalia
- Order: Artiodactyla
- Family: Suidae
- Subfamily: Suinae
- Genus: Sus; Linnaeus, 1758

Type species
- Sus scrofa Linnaeus, 1758

Species
- Sus ahoenobarbus Sus barbatus Sus bucculentus Sus cebifrons Sus celebensis Sus domesticus Sus heureni Sus oliveri Sus philippensis Sus scrofa Sus verrucosus

Audio
- Call of a domestic pig

= Sus (genus) =

Sus Temporal range: Early Pleistocene to recent

Genus of even-toed ungulates

Sus (/ˈsuːs/) is the genus of domestic and wild pigs, within the even-toed ungulate family Suidae. Sus includes domestic pigs (Sus domesticus) and their ancestor, the common Eurasian wild boar (Sus scrofa), along with various other species. Sus species, like all suids, are native to the Eurasian and African continents, ranging from Europe to the Pacific islands.

Juvenile pigs are known as piglets. Pigs live in complex social groups and are considered one of the more intelligent mammals, as reflected in their ability to learn.

With around 1 billion of this species alive at any time, the domestic pig is among the most populous large mammals in the world. Pigs are omnivores and can consume a wide range of food. Pigs have biological similarities to humans and are therefore frequently used for human medical research.

== Etymology ==
The Online Etymology Dictionary provides anecdotal evidence as well as linguistic, saying that the term derives

probably from Old English *picg, found in compounds, ultimate origin unknown. Originally "young pig" (the word for adults was swine). Apparently related to Low German bigge, Dutch big ("but the phonology is difficult" -- OED). ... Another Old English word for "pig" was fearh, related to furh "furrow," from PIE *perk- "dig, furrow" (source also of Latin porc-us "pig," see pork). "This reflects a widespread IE tendency to name animals from typical attributes or activities" [Roger Lass]. Synonyms grunter, oinker are from sailors' and fishermen's euphemistic avoidance of uttering the word pig at sea, a superstition perhaps based on the fate of the Gadarene swine, who drowned.

The Online Etymology Dictionary also traces the evolution of sow, the term for a female pig, through various historical languages:

Old English sugu, su "female of the swine," from Proto-Germanic *su- (cognates: Old Saxon, Old High German su, German Sau, Dutch zeug, Old Norse syr), from PIE root *su- (cognates: Sanskrit sukarah "wild boar, swine;" Avestan hu "wild boar;" Greek hys "swine;" Latin sus "swine", suinus "pertaining to swine"; Old Church Slavonic svinija "swine;" Lettish sivens "young pig;" Welsh hucc, Irish suig "swine; Old Irish socc "snout, plowshare"), possibly imitative of pig noise; note that Sanskrit sukharah means "maker of (the sound) su".

An adjectival form is porcine. Another adjectival form (technically for the subfamily rather than genus name) is suine (comparable to bovine, canine, etc.); for the family, it is suid (as with bovid, canid).

== Description and behaviour ==
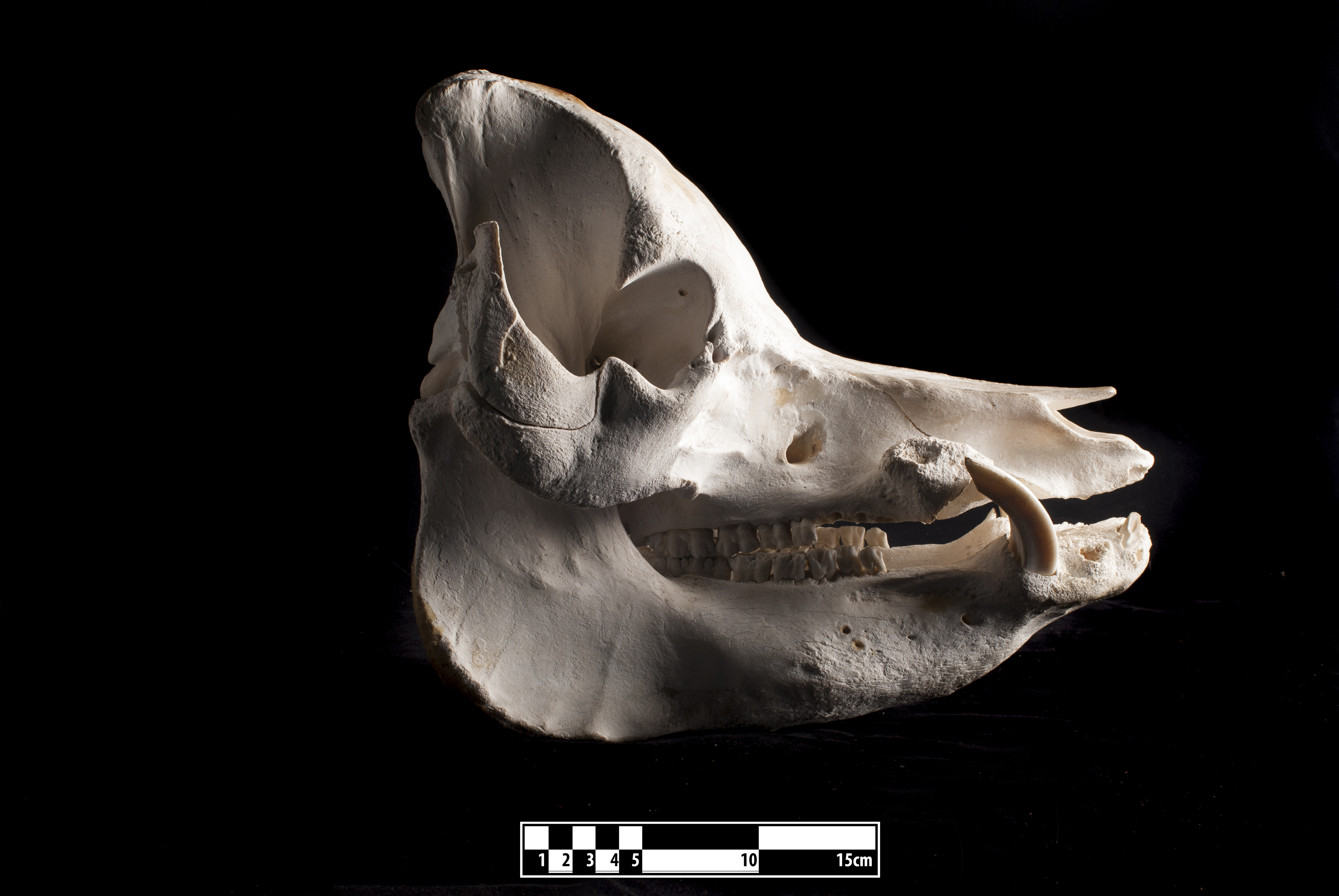
Skull of a domestic pig (Sus domesticus)

A typical pig has a large head with a long snout that is strengthened by a special prenasal bone and by a disk of cartilage at the tip. The snout is used to dig into the soil to find food and is a very acute sense organ. Each foot has four hooves with the two larger central toes bearing most of the weight, and the outer two also being used in soft ground.

The dental formula of adult pigs is 3.1.4.33.1.4.3, giving a total of 44 teeth. The rear teeth are adapted for crushing. In the male, the canine teeth form tusks, which grow continuously and are sharpened by constantly being ground against each other.

Occasionally, captive mother pigs may savage their own piglets, often if they become severely stressed. Some attacks on newborn piglets are non-fatal. Others may kill the piglets and sometimes, the mother may eat them. An estimated 50% of piglet fatalities are due to the mother attacking, or unintentionally crushing, the newborn pre-weaned animals.

== Distribution and evolution ==
With around 1 billion individuals alive at any time, the domestic pig is one of the most numerous large mammals on the planet.

The ancestor of the domestic pig is the wild boar, which is one of the most numerous and widespread large mammals. Its many subspecies are native to all but the harshest climates of continental Eurasia and its islands and Africa as well, from Ireland and India to Japan and north to Siberia.

Long isolated from other pigs on the many islands of Indonesia, Malaysia, and the Philippines, pigs have evolved into many different species, including wild boar, bearded pigs, and warty pigs. Humans have introduced pigs into Australia, North and South America, and numerous islands, either as wild boar or accidentally as escaped domestic pigs which have gone feral.

== Habitat and reproduction ==
The wild boar (Sus scrofa) can take advantage of any forage resources. Therefore, they can live in virtually any productive habitat that can provide enough water to sustain large mammals such as pigs. Pigs are famously fecund; when well-fed, a sow can birth twelve or more piglets in her annual litter. If there is increased foraging by wild boars in certain areas, they can cause a nutritional shortage which can cause the pig population to decrease. If the nutritional state returns to normal, the pig population will most likely rise due to the pigs' naturally increased reproduction rate.

== Diet and foraging ==
Pigs are omnivores, which means that they consume both plants and animals. In the wild, they are foragers, searching through their habitat for food (which, for pigs, often includes digging with their snouts). Wild pigs eat roots, tubers, leaves, fruits, mushrooms, and flowers, in addition to some insects (especially insect grubs) and fish. Pigs are famously fond of truffle mushrooms, which grow underground; pigs find them by scent and unearth them with their snouts. In Europe, trained "truffle pigs" find these valuable fungi for humans. Pigs do not hunt but will readily eat carrion, eggs, and other animal foods that they can find. As livestock, pigs were once fed all manner of mixed household food scraps (called "slops"), but on large modern farms are now fed mostly corn and soybean meal with a mixture of vitamins and minerals added. Traditionally, pigs were raised on dairy farms and fed any excess milk and the whey left over from cheese and butter making. Pigs brought so much extra income to these farms that they earned the nickname "mortgage lifters". Older pigs will consume three to five gallons of water per day. When kept as pets, the optimal healthy diet consists mainly of a balanced diet of raw vegetables, although some may give their pigs commercial mini pig pellet feed.

== Relationship with humans ==
Most pigs today are domesticated pigs raised for meat (known as pork). Miniature breeds are commonly kept as pets. Because of their foraging abilities and excellent sense of smell, people in many European countries use them to find truffles. Both wild and feral pigs are commonly hunted.

Apart from meat, pig skin is turned into leather, and their hairs are used to make brushes. The relatively short, stiff, coarse pig hairs are called bristles, and were once so commonly used in paintbrushes that in 1946 the Australian Government launched Operation Pig Bristle. In May 1946, in response to a shortage of pig bristles for paintbrushes to paint houses in the post-World War II construction boom, the Royal Australian Air Force (RAAF) flew in 28 short tons of pig bristles from China, their only commercially available source at the time.

=== Use in human healthcare ===
Human skin is very similar to pig skin, therefore many preclinical studies employ pig skin. In addition to providing use in biomedical research and for drug testing, genetic advances in human healthcare have provided a pathway for domestic pigs to become xenotransplantation candidates for humans.

== Species ==
Pig 'oink'
Oink!

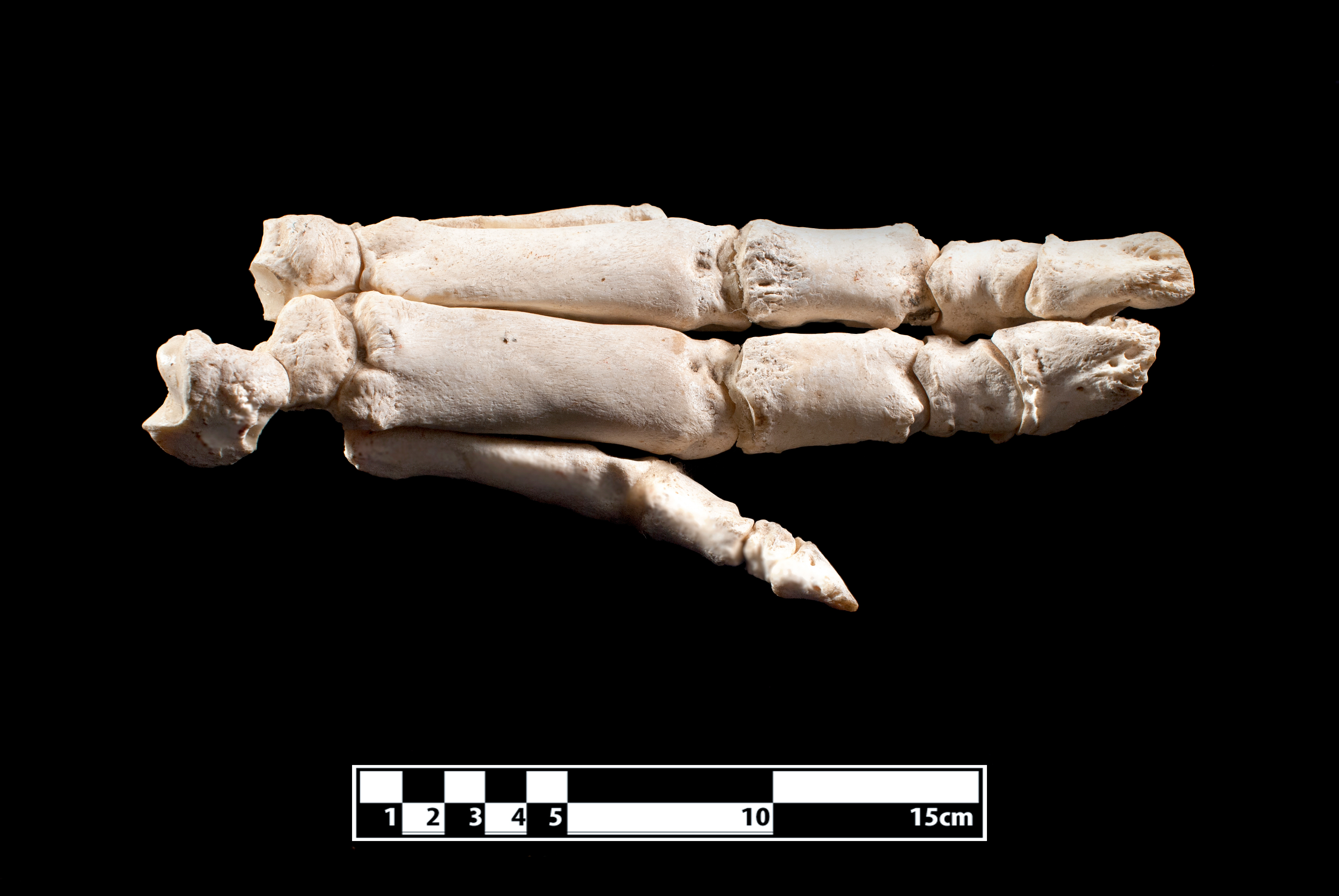
Skeleton of foot

The genus Sus is currently thought to contain nine living species. Several extinct species (†) are known from fossils.

=== Extant species ===
Genus Sus – Linnaeus, 1758 – nine species
Common name	Scientific name and subspecies	Range	Size and ecology	IUCN status and estimated population
Palawan bearded pig	Sus ahoenobarbus Huet, 1888	Philippines	Size: Habitat: Diet:	NT
Bornean bearded pig	Sus barbatus Müller, 1838 Two subspecies: S. b. barbatus (the nominate subspecies); S. b. oi (western bearded pig)	Sumatra, Borneo, the Malay Peninsula	Size: Habitat: Diet:	VU
Visayan warty pig	Sus cebifrons Heude, 1888 Two subspecies: Cebu warty pig (Sus cebifrons cebifrons) (believed to be extinct); Negros warty pig (Sus cebifrons negrinus).	Philippines (Cebu, Negros, Panay, Masbate, Guimaras, and Siquijor)	Size: Habitat: Diet:	CR
Celebes warty pig or Sulawesi warty pig	Sus celebensis Müller & Schlegel, 1843 Three subspecies: Sus celebensis celebensis; Sus celebensis floresianus; Sus celebensis timoriensis	Sulawesi in Indonesia	Size: Habitat: Diet:	NT
Domestic pig	Sus domesticus (sometimes considered subspecies of S. scrofa); Erxleben, 1777	Domesticated	Size: Habitat: Diet:	LC
Oliver's warty pig or Mindoro warty pig	Sus oliveri Groves, 1997	Philippines	Size: Habitat: Diet:	VU
Philippine warty pig	Sus philippensis Nehring, 1886 Three subspecies: S. p. philippensis (from Luzon and nearby islands); S. p. mindanensis (from Samar, Leyte, and other islands near Mindanao); S. p. oliveri (from Mindoro)	Philippines	Size: Habitat: Diet:	VU
Wild boar	Sus scrofa Linnaeus, 1758 Fifteen subspecies: S. s. scrofa; S. s. algira; S. s. attila; S. s. cristatus; S. s. davidi; S. s. leucomystax; S. s. libycus; S. s. majori; S. s. meridionalis; S. s. moupinensis; S. s. nigripes; S. s. riukiuanus; S. s. sibiricus; S. s. taivanus; S. s. ussuricus; S. s. vittatus	North Africa and much of Eurasia; from the British Isles to Korea and the Sunda Islands.	Size: Habitat: Diet:	LC
Javan warty pig	Sus verrucosus Boie, 1832	Indonesia	Size: Habitat: Diet:	EN

- The pygmy hog, formerly Sus salvanius, is now placed in the monotypic genus Porcula.
- The Red river hog, formerly Sus porcus, is now placed in the genus Potamochoerus.

=== Fossil species ===
- †Sus australis Han, 1987 – Early Pleistocene of China
- †Sus bijiashanensis Han et al., 1975 – Early Pleistocene of China
- †Sus falconeri – Pleistocene of the Siwalik region, India
- †Sus houi Qi et al., 1999 – Pleistocene of China
- †Sus hysudricus Falconer and Cautley 1847 – Pliocene of India
- †Sus jiaoshanensis Zhao, 1980 – Early Pleistocene of China
- †Sus liuchengensis Han, 1987 – Early Pleistocene of China
- †Sus lydekkeri Zdansky, 1928 – Pleistocene of China
- †Sus officinalis Koenigswald, 1933 – Middle Pleistocene of China
- †Sus peii Han, 1987 – Early Pleistocene of China
- †Sus subtriquetra Xue, 1981
- †Sus strozzi Forsyth Major, 1881 – Pliocene and Early Pleistocene of Europe
- †Sus xiaozhu Han et al., 1975 – Early Pleistocene of China

== Domestication ==
Pigs have been domesticated since ancient times in the Old World. Pigs were domesticated on each end of Eurasia, and possibly several times. It is now thought that pigs were attracted to human settlements for the food scraps, and that the process of domestication began as a commensal relationship. Archaeological evidence suggests that pigs were being managed in the wild in a way similar to the way they are managed by some modern New Guineans from wild boar as early as 13,000–12,700 BP in the Near East in the Tigris Basin, Çayönü, Cafer Höyük, Nevalı Çori. Remains of pigs have been dated to earlier than 11,400 BP in Cyprus that must have been introduced from the mainland which suggests domestication in the adjacent mainland by then.

Pigs were also domesticated in China, potentially more than once. In some parts of China pigs were kept in pens from early times, separating them from wild populations and allowing farmers to create breeds that were fatter and bred more quickly. Early Modern Europeans brought these breeds back home and crossed them with their own pigs, which was the origins of most modern pig breeds.

In India, pigs have been domesticated for a long time mostly in Goa and some rural areas for pig toilets. This practice also occurred in China. Though ecologically logical as well as economical, pig toilets are waning in popularity as use of septic tanks and/or sewerage systems is increasing in rural areas.

Hernando de Soto and other early Spanish explorers brought pigs to southeastern North America from Europe. As in medieval Europe, pigs are valued on certain oceanic islands for their self-sufficiency, which allows them to be turned loose, although the practice does have drawbacks (see environmental impact).

The domestic pig (Sus domesticus) is usually given the scientific name Sus scrofa domesticus, although some taxonomists, including the American Society of Mammalogists, call it S. domesticus, reserving S. scrofa for the wild boar. It was domesticated approximately 5,000 to 7,000 years ago. The upper canines form sharp distinctive tusks that curve outward and upward. Compared to other artiodactyles, their head is relatively long, pointed, and free of warts. Their head and body length ranges from 0.9 to 1.8 m (35 to 71 in) and they can weigh between 50 and 350 kg (110 and 770 lb).

In November 2012, scientists sequenced the genome of the domestic pig. The similarities between the pig and human genomes mean that the new data may have wide applications in the study and treatment of human genetic diseases.

In August 2015, a study looked at over 100 pig genome sequences to ascertain their process of domestication. The study indicated that pigs were domesticated separately in Western Asia and China, with Western Asian pigs introduced into Europe where they crossed with wild boar. A model that fitted the data included admixture with a now extinct ghost population of wild pigs during the Pleistocene. The study also found that despite back-crossing with wild pigs, the genomes of domestic pigs have strong signatures of selection at DNA loci that affect behavior and morphology. The study concluded that human selection for domestic traits likely counteracted the homogenizing effect of gene flow from wild boars and created domestication islands in the genome.

== In culture ==
Pigs have been important in culture across the world since Neolithic times. They appear in art, literature, and religion. In Asia the wild boar is one of 12 animal images comprising the Chinese zodiac, while in Europe the boar represents a standard charge in heraldry. In Islam and Judaism pigs and those who handle them are viewed negatively, and the consumption of pork is forbidden.

Pigs are alluded to in animal epithets and proverbs.

The pig has been celebrated throughout Europe since ancient times in its carnivals, the name coming from the Italian carne levare, the lifting of meat.

Pigs have been brought into literature for varying reasons, ranging from the pleasures of eating, as in Charles Lamb's A Dissertation upon Roast Pig, to William Golding's Lord of the Flies (with the fat character "Piggy"), where the rotting boar's head on a stick represents Beelzebub, "lord of the flies", and George Orwell's allegorical novel Animal Farm, where the central characters, representing Soviet leaders, are all pigs.

== Environmental damage ==
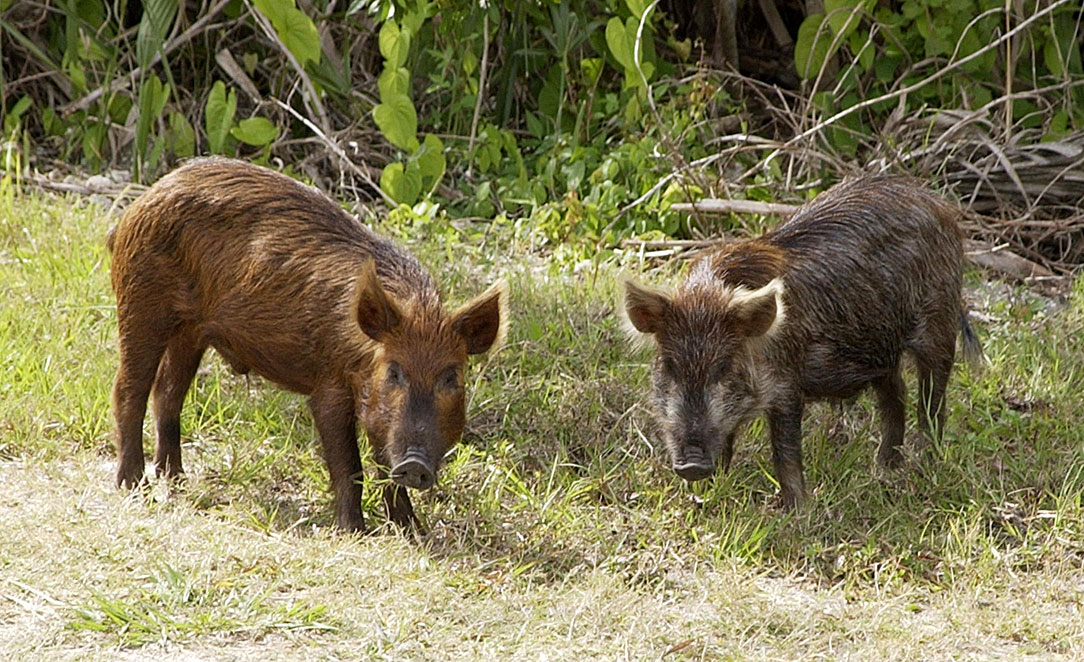
Feral pigs (razorbacks) in Florida

Domestic pigs that have escaped from urban areas or were allowed to forage in the wild, and in some cases wild boars which were introduced as prey for hunting, have given rise to large populations of feral pigs in North and South America, Australia, New Zealand, Hawaii, and other areas where pigs are not native. Accidental or deliberate releases of pigs into countries or environments where they are an alien species have caused extensive environmental change. Their omnivorous diet, aggressive behaviour, and their feeding method of rooting in the ground all combine to severely alter ecosystems unused to pigs. Pigs will even eat small animals and destroy nests of ground nesting birds. The Invasive Species Specialist Group lists feral pigs on the list of the world's 100 worst invasive species and says:

Feral pigs like other introduced mammals are major drivers of extinction and ecosystem change. They have been introduced into many parts of the world, and will damage crops and home gardens as well as potentially spreading disease. They uproot large areas of land, eliminating native vegetation and spreading weeds. This results in habitat alteration, a change in plant succession and composition and a decrease in native fauna dependent on the original habitat.

== Health problems ==
Because of their biological similarities, pigs can harbour a range of parasites and diseases that can be transmitted to humans. Examples of such zoonoses include trichinosis, Taenia solium, cysticercosis, and brucellosis. Pigs also host large concentrations of parasitic ascarid worms in their digestive tracts.

Some strains of influenza are endemic in pigs, the most significant of which are H1N1, H1N2, and H3N2, the first of which has caused several outbreaks among humans, including the Spanish flu, 1977 Russian flu pandemic, and the 2009 swine flu pandemic.

== See also ==
- Babirusa
- Bushpig
- Domestic pig
- Entelodont
- Feral pig
- Fetal pig
- Hog-baiting
- List of fictional pigs
- List of pigs
- Miniature pig
- Peccary
- Pig Beach
- Pig Olympics
- Red river hog
- Truffle hog
- Vietnamese Pot-bellied
- Wild boar
