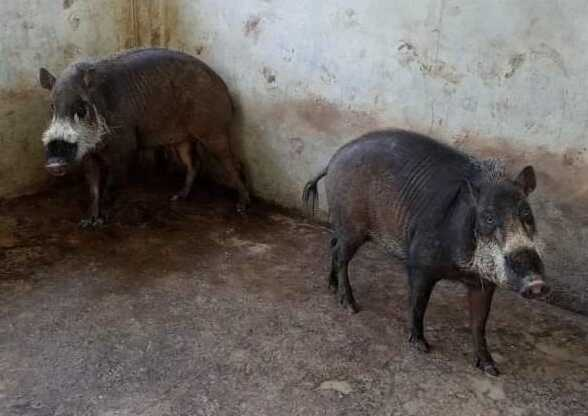

Conservation status
- Near Threatened (IUCN 3.1)

Scientific classification
- Kingdom: Animalia
- Phylum: Chordata
- Class: Mammalia
- Order: Artiodactyla
- Family: Suidae
- Genus: Sus
- Species: S. ahoenobarbus

Binomial name
- Sus ahoenobarbus Huet, 1888
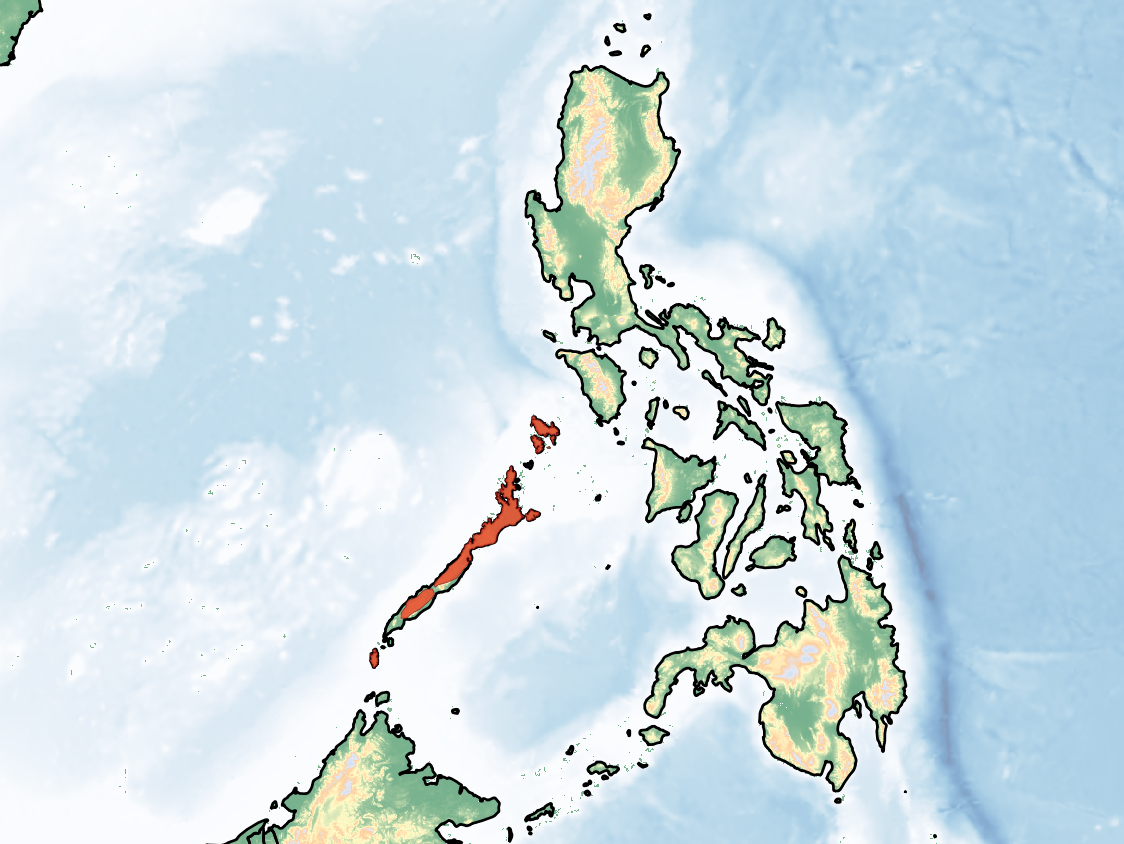

Synonyms
- Species Level: Chaetorhinus ahoenobarbus; Subspecies Level: Sus barbatus ahoenobarbus; Chaetorhinus barbatus ahoenobarbus

= Palawan bearded pig =

Species of mammal

The Palawan bearded pig (Sus ahoenobarbus) is a pig species in the genus Sus endemic to the Philippines, where it occurs on the archipelago of islands formed by Balabac, Palawan, and the Calamian Islands. It is 1 to 1.6 m (3.3 to 5.2 ft) in length, about 1 m (3.3 ft) tall and weigh up to 150 kg (330 lb).

== Taxonomy ==
Until recently, it was considered a subspecies of the Bornean bearded pig (Sus barbatus), but at least under the phylogenetic species concept, it must be classified as a separate species. For its treatment under other (and more widely used) species concepts, more study is required, but the presently available information seems to argue for full species status in any case.

== Fossils ==
Fossils excavated in Palawan were identified as being of the Palawan bearded pig, deer, Philippine long-tailed macaques, tiger, small mammals, lizards, snakes and turtles. From the stone tools, besides the evidence for cuts on the bones, and the use of fire, it would appear that early humans had accumulated the bones.

Borneo might have been connected to Palawan during the penultimate and previous glacial periods, judging from the molecular phylogeny of murids. Remains of pigs were compared with the wild boar (Sus scrofa)and Palawanese wild boar (Sus ahoenobarbus). It is known that the wild boar was imported as a domesticate to the islands from mainland Southeast Asia during the late Holocene.

== See also ==
- Puerto Princesa Subterranean River National Park, Palawan
