= Gomphotherium land bridge =

Prehistoric biogeographic connection

The Gomphotherium land bridge was a land bridge that connected Eurasia to Afro-Arabia between approximately 19 and 15 million years ago (Ma) during the Burdigalian stage of the Early Miocene. More recent analysis found that the Gomphotherium land bridge may have formed slightly earlier, around 20 Ma, which resulted in the Great Old World Biotic Interchange. It is believed that the connection between the Mediterranean and Indian oceans was temporarily re-established during the Langhian stage of the Middle Miocene, before reclosing, and has remained closed to present day. The formation of the land bridge led to an important biotic interchange event known as the Great Old World Biotic Interchange (GOWBI) or the Proboscidean Datum Event, which saw fauna from Eurasia migrating into Afro-Arabia and vice versa.

Similar interchanges of have happened occurred throughout the Cenozoic, such and the collision between insular India and Asia. As well as the collision of the Americas, which resulted in the Great American Interchange.

== Before the interchange ==
=== Isolation of Afro-Arabia ===
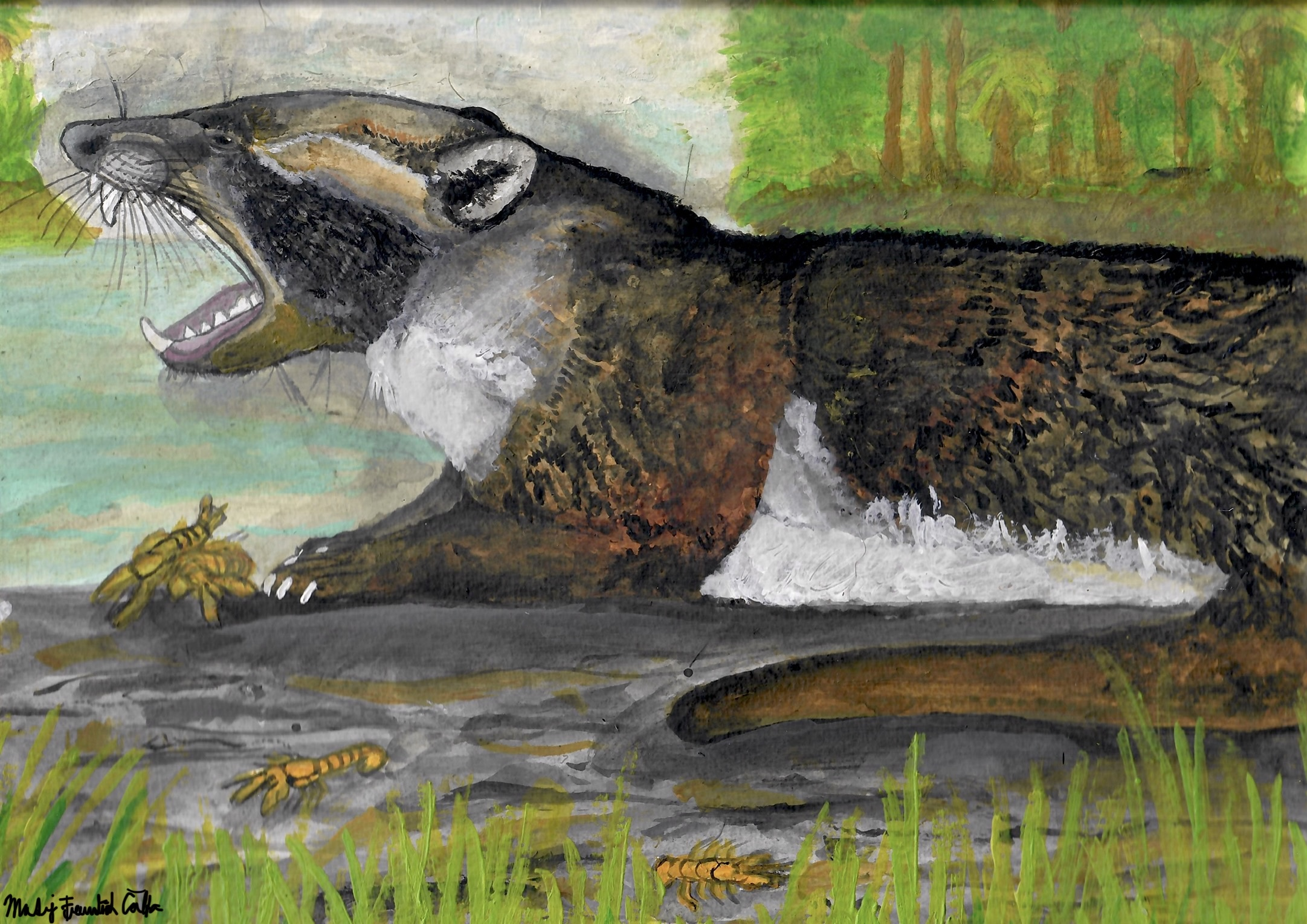
Apterodon langebadreae, an apterodontine hyaenodont

During the Early Cretaceous (Aptian-Albian), Africa became isolated from the rest of Gondwana and Laurasia, spending the rest of the Cretaceous and most of the Cenozoic as an island continent. Mammalian fauna endemic to the continent primarily consisted of Afrotheria (proboscideans, sirenians, embrithopods, hyracoids, and several other groups), metatherians (herpetotheriids), and hyaenodonts (hyainailouroids and several unranked clades).

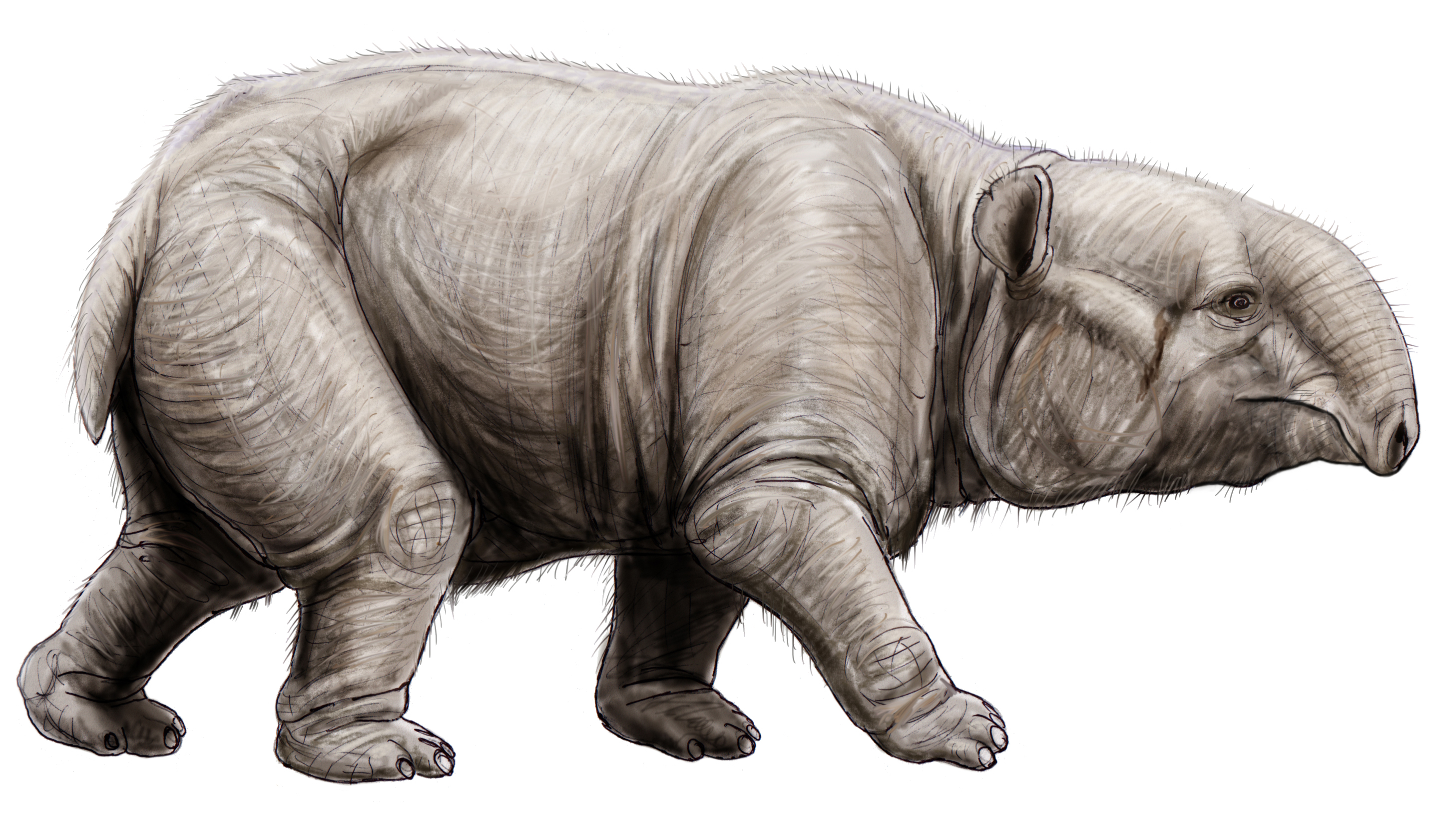
Barytherium, a basal proboscidean

Proboscideans, the order that contains modern elephants, first evolved in Africa around 60 Ma, during the Selandian stage of the Paleocene; with Eritherium being the earliest known proboscidean, which weighed 3–8 kilograms (6.6–17.6 lb). By the Early Eocene, proboscideans began growing in size. Daouitherium, the earliest known elephantiform, may have weighed 200 kg (440 lb). This would make it the earliest known large mammal within Africa. By the Late Eocene, some taxa began to reach notable sizes such as Barytherium, which could have weighed 2 tonnes (2.0 long tons; 2.2 short tons). Some proboscideans during this time, such as Barytherium and Moeritherium, were semi-aquatic. Elephantimorphs, a clade of proboscideans that includes mastodons and modern elephants, first appeared in the Late Oligocene.

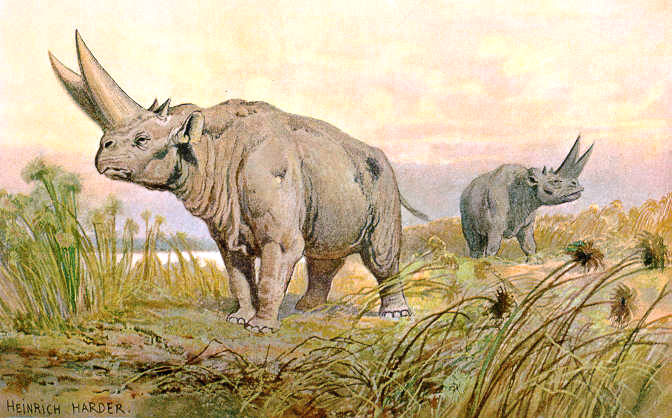
Arsinoitherium, a derived embrithopod

Embrithopods are a enigmatic order of afrotherian mammals that arose in the Early Eocene. The earliest known embrithopod was Stylolophus. Arsinoitheriids were a highly successful group of large herbivores that were widespread in Africa. Arsinoitherium, the most well known taxon, was rhino-like in appearance. The largest species could have stood 1.75 m (5.7 ft) at the shoulders and measured 3 m (9.8 ft) in length. One of its defining features was a pair of enormous horns on its head, which was structured similarly to the horns of modern bovids. Embrithopods were last recorded in latest Oligocene.

Within the carnivore guild, hyaenodonts were the dominant carnivores of Africa. Hyaenodonts were consisted of groups such as hyainailouroids, boualitomines, and the Lahimia clade. Hyainailouroids, the most notable group, were one of the three superfamilies of Hyaenodonta, an extinct order of carnivorous mammals, and were thought to have originated from Afro-Arabia, evolving during the Late Paleocene, despite the oldest fossils of hyainailourids being found in Asia. The hyainailourids were ecologically diverse, while hyainailourines were terrestrial predators, apterodontines had otter-like adaptations suggesting they were semi-aquatic predators.

Non-mammalian predators included reptiles such as the large madtsoiid Gigantophis and the sebecosuchian Eremosuchus.

=== Early dispersals ===
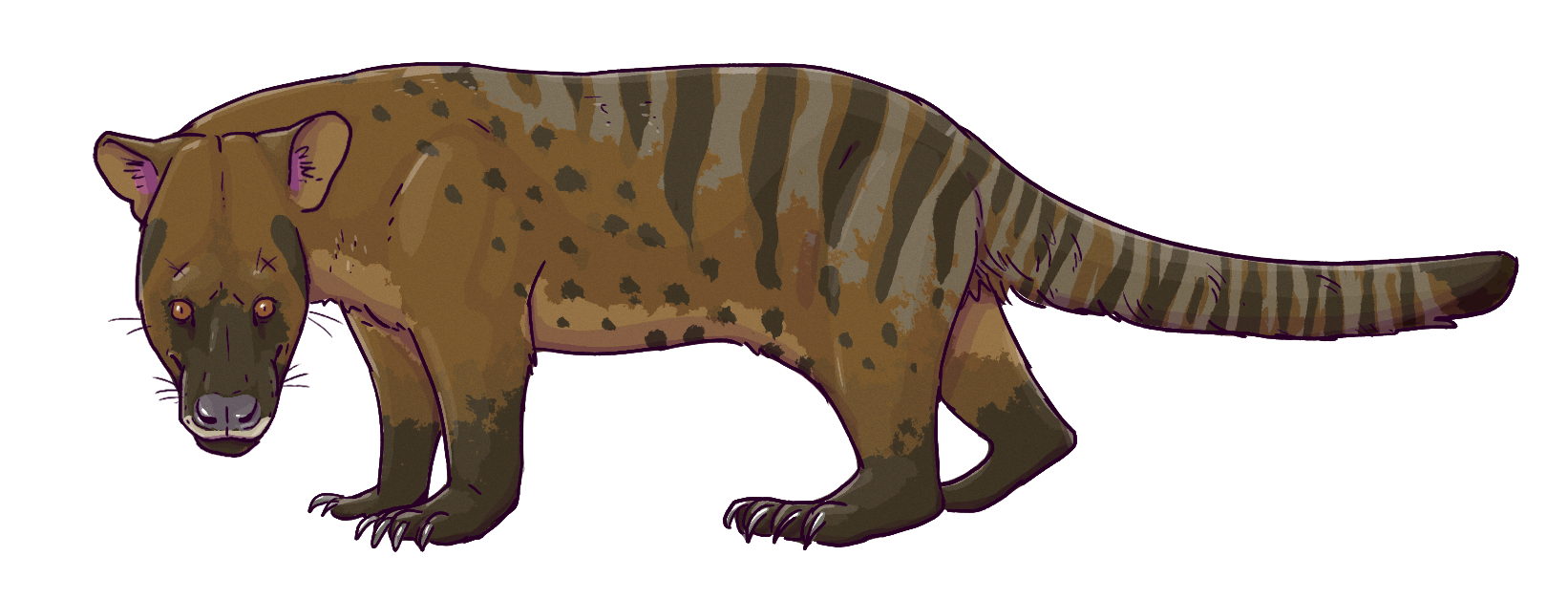
Pterodon dasyuroides, a hyainailourine

==== Afro-Arabian origin ====
Hyainailourids had dispersed into Europe at least three times during the Paleogene via the Iberian Peninsula. Hyainailourines made their first appearance in at MP16, with the appearance of Paroxyaena galliae and Kerberos. The second dispersal was during the Late Eocene, being represented by Pterodon and Parapterodon. The second dispersal also led to hyainailourines appearing in North America during the late Duchesnean. Hyainailourines would later go extinct in Europe during the Grande Coupure, a faunal turnover event that was contemporary with the global Eocene-Oligocene extinction event Eocene-Oligocene extinction event. The extinction event correlates with abrupt shift towards a icehouse world, which stems from the expansion of the Antarctic ice sheets and saw sea level decline by 70 m (230 ft).

Grande Coupure saw a 60% extinction rate for West European mammalian lineages, which were replaced by Asian faunal immigrants. This included the arrival of carnivorans from Asia such as later amphicyonids, amphicynodontids, nimravids, and ursids which deprised into Western Europe via new land connection with Asia following the receding of the Turgai Strait. Originally it was thought that the cooling climate, as well as competition with carnivorans, played a role in the extinction of Pterodon. However, more recent analysis found no evidence of competitive displacement between carnivorans and hyaenodonts as the latter was significantly more diverse until the Grande Coupure. It has also been noted that the transition within the carnivorous fauna was gradual with immigrant carnivorans dispersed into Western Europe after the extinction of the hyainailourines.

The third dispersal was during the Oligocene, represented by Apterodon gaudryi. MP23 marked the last occurrence of European Apterodon, with their extinction likely being the result of global cooling. Hyainailourines also dispersed into Asia at least once during the Paleogene, which led to the evolution of Maocyon and Orienspterodon.

Embrithopods dispersed into Eurasia during the Late Paleocene, represented by Palaeoamasia, Crivadiatherium, and Hypsamasia. Both Hypsamasia and Palaeoamasia were present on Balkanatolia, an island continent that was separated from the rest of Eurasia. Their dispersal to Eurasia was thought to have been possible via rafting or island hopping. Compared to arsinoitheriids, palaeoamasiids had more conservative dentitions. However, with the exception of Palaeoamasia, the Balkanatolia fauna was rapidly replaced by Asian immigrants. Prior to the arrival of Asian mammals, the island saw a trend towards increasingly arid and seasonal floral assemblages which increased stress for the endemic fauna. Biotic interactions with endemic Balkanatolia fauna and invasive Asian mammals may have been the most probable cause of the extinction of Balkanatolian endemics as insular ecosystems tend to be more vulnerable to invasive taxa.

=== Eurasian origins ===
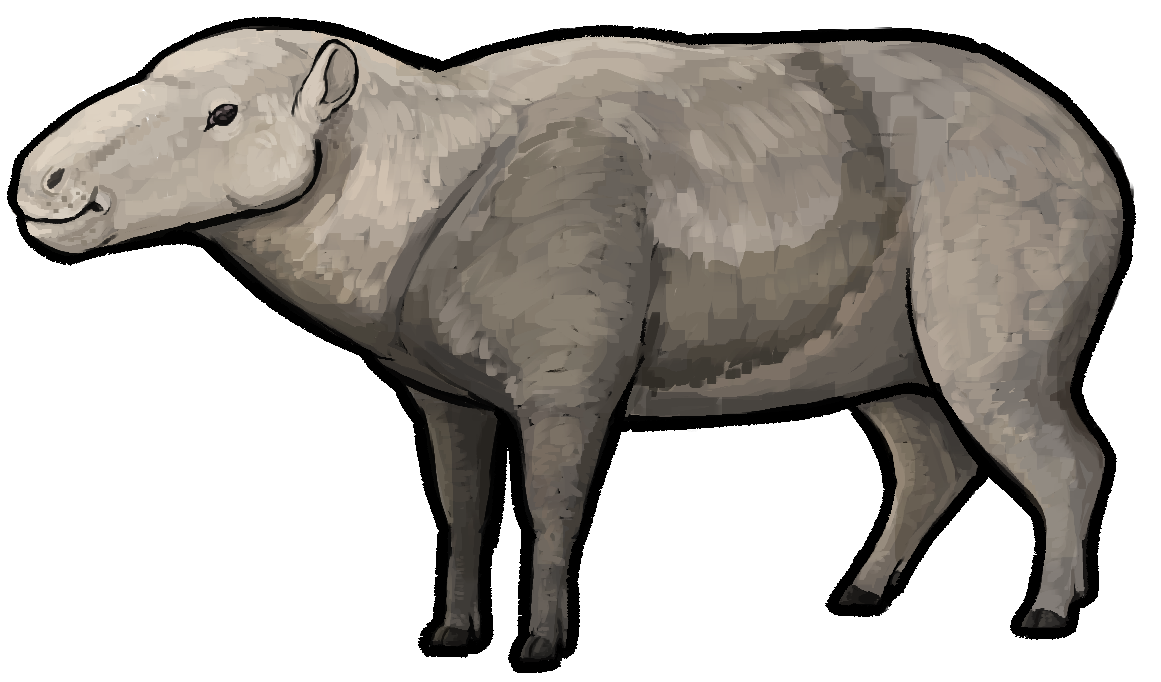
Bothriogenys, an anthracothere

The order Hyaenodonta were believed to have originated from Europe sometime during the Late Cretaceous or the Early Paleocene. From Europe, they would've dispersed into Afro-Arabia which gave rise to the Afro-Arabian clade of hyaenodonts.

Anthropoid primates were originally thought to have evolved in Africa, but more recent evidence now suggests they evolved in Asia. Fossil evidence suggests at least two Asian anthropoids colonized Africa. Because of the similarity between Afrasia and Afrotarsius, the colonization of eosimiiforms anthropoids must have occurred shortly before 38 Ma. On the other hand, most of the early African anthropoids belonged to the simiiform clade. Anthracotheres were thought to have evolved in Asia before dispersing into Africa during the Late Eocene, with Bothriogenys representing the earliest African anthracothere. North Africa was the primary area of their evolution. By the Early Oligocene, anthracotheres diversified into two genera: Bothriogenys and Qatraniodon. However, the former would still be more abundant and would later give rise to Brachyodus.

== Effects and aftermath ==
The formation of the Gomphotherium land bridge marked the end of Africa's biogeographic isolation, which lasted for 75 million years. Passage of fauna between Eurasia and the Arabian Plate and thus Africa was largely hindered before the Early Miocene, as many animals could not cross the open Tethyan seaway, with a few exceptions. However, during the mid-Burdigalian, the tectonic plates of Afro-Arabia and Eurasia collided, creating a terrestrial isthmus connecting the two landmasses. This faunal exchange that resulted is known as the Proboscidean Datum Event or the Great Old World Biotic Interchange (GOWBI).

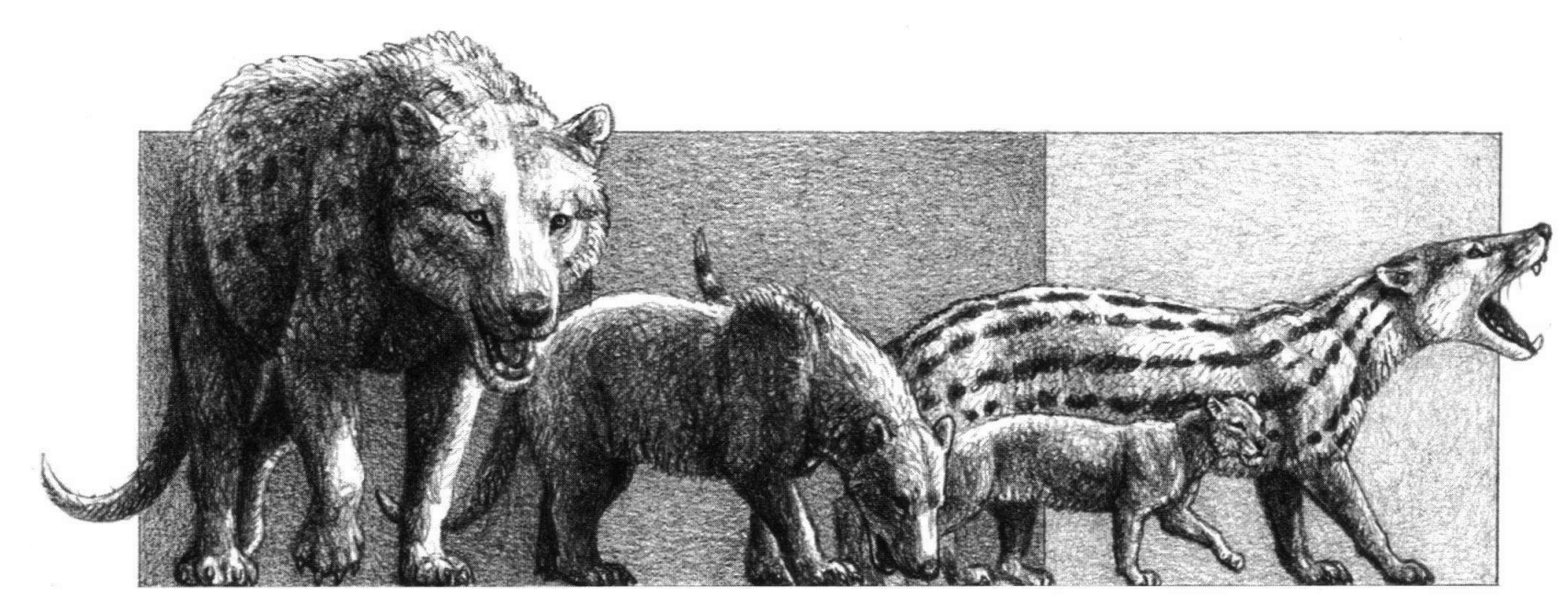
Restoration of Hyainailouros sulzeri (far left), Cynelos eurydon, Afrosmilus africanus and Hyainailouros napakensis (far right)

The land bridge allowed the elephantine gomphotheres and other proboscideans to migrate out of Africa and into Eurasia. Ungulates, which dominated the large herbivore fauna in Eurasia since the start of the Cenozoic, were also able to disperse into Africa due to the formation of the land bridge. This marked the second wave of anthracotheres dispersing into Africa, which included genera such as Afromeryx and Sivameryx. On the other hand, Brachyodus was able to disperse into Europe around 20 Ma. Fossil evidence also showed dispersal events with mammalian predators. Hyainailouroids such as Hyainailouros, Dissopsalis, Metapterodon, and possibly Megistotherium, were able to disperse from Afro-Arabia into Eurasia, while carnivorans (amphicyonids, felids, mustelids, and viverrids) were able to dispersed from Eurasia into Afro-Arabia.

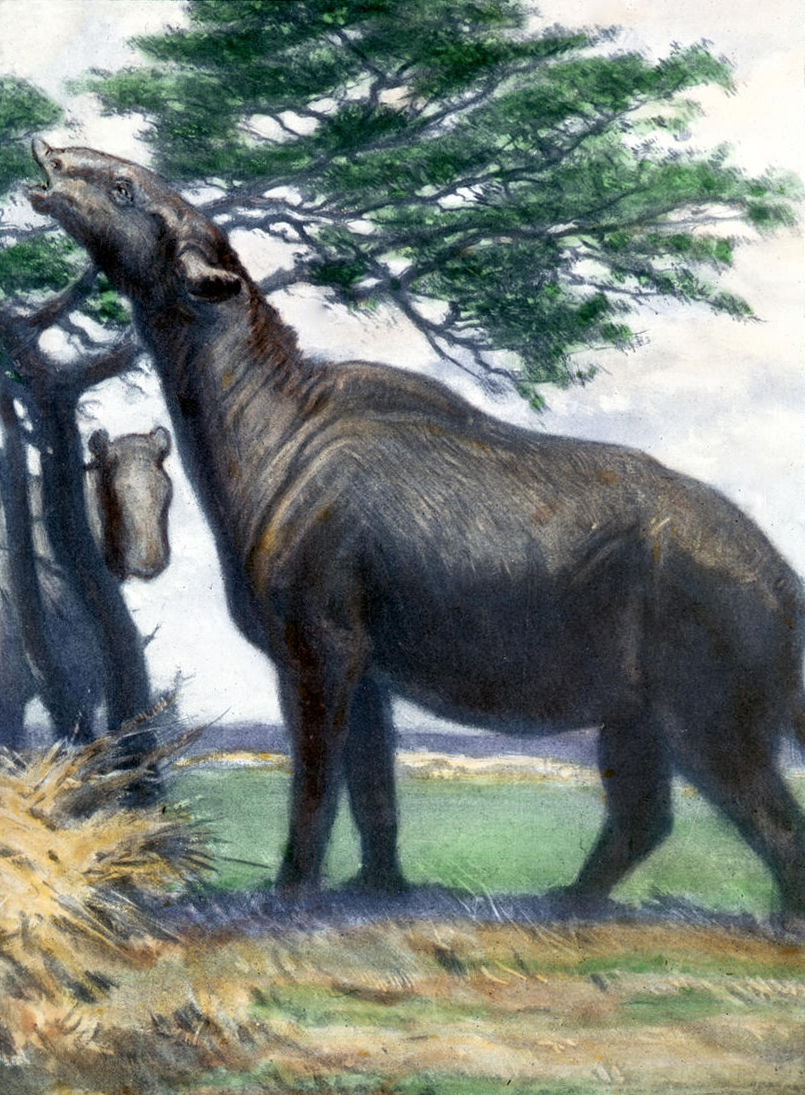
Restoration of a feeding Paraceratherium transouralicum. Some experts hypothesize that the arrival of hyainailourines and gomphotheres may have led to their extinction.

The first occurrences in Afro-Arabia saw a dramatic spike with at least 37 Eurasian lineages dispersing into Afro-Arabia during the Burdigalian stage of the Miocene. The mammalian exchange between the two continents was asymmetrical with most mammals originating from Eurasia. Ungulates saw an increase in diversification and explored new functional spaces. However, some animals found in Afro-Arabia have been proven to be successful in Eurasia such as hyaenodonts and proboscideans. Proboscideans also showed an increase in diversity and would were able to disperse into North America via the Bering land bridge. Some experts hypothesized that the arrival of gomphotheres may have resulted in the extinction of the paraceratheres. Much like modern elephants, gomphotheres may have knocked down trees which in turn created open landscapes. Due to being specialized for high browsing, paraceratheres could not cover their energy loss while browsing lower than 2 m (6 ft 7 in). It was also thought that the inability to defend their calves from large hyainailourines such as Hyainailouros may have also resulted in their extinction. However, the validity of this hypothesis remains unclear.

The arrival of mammals from Eurasia coincided with the extinction of many hyracoids, and other afrotherian mammals, as well as several endemic lineages of rodents. Hyracoids probably could not compete with the diversifying ungulates due to their inefficiency in feeding, low metabolic rate, and short plantigrade feet made them less effective competitors against ungulates in open environments.

Some experts have hypothesized that the embrithopods could not compete with the invaders due to their generalized habits and phyletic conservatism. However, this is questionable as embrithopods were last recorded in the latest Oligocene, suggesting they went extinct prior to the formation of the land bridge.

=== Disappearance of native Afro-Arabian predators ===
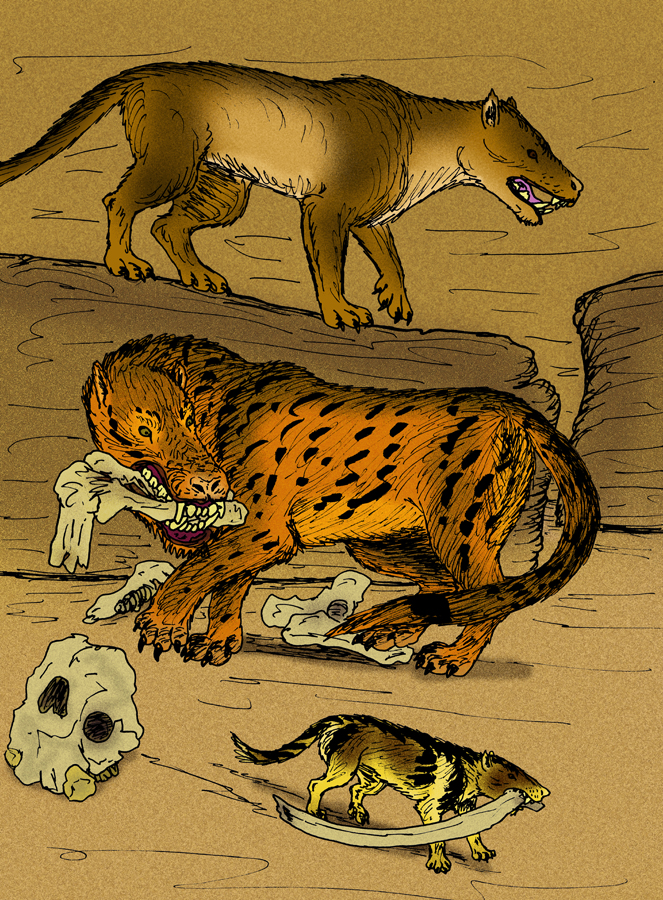
Comparison of various Early to Middle Miocene hyaenodonts that were present during and after the GOWBI, including the hyainailourids Hyainailouros sulzeri (top) and Megistotherium osteothlastes (center), and teratodontid Dissopsalis pyroclasticus

Prior to the arrival of carnivorans, hyaenodonts were the dominant predators of Afro-Arabia. Despite hyaenodonts continuing to be successful in both Africa and Eurasia, it has been suggested that competition with carnivorans resulted in the decline and eventual extinction of the hyainailouroids. The discovery of Pakakali implies small hyainailourines, during the Paleogene, had a diverse diet being similar to that of mesocarnivores such as gray foxes and ringtail. This contrasts small hyaenodonts in the Neogene, such as Miocene hyainailourines similar in size or smaller than Pakakli, such as Isohyaenodon pilgrimi, Mlanyama, and Metapterodon kaiseri, showed high levels of specialization towards hypercarnivory. On the other hand, the abundance of small mesocarnivorous carnivorans present in Afro-Arabia, such as Kichechia zamanae and Leptoplesictis namibiensis, suggests carnivorans quickly dominated this niche after dispersing into the continent. This suggests small hyainailourines may have become hypercarnivorous due to the arrival of small carnivorans.

Several experts have suggested that large hyainailourines, such as Hyainailouros and Megistotherium, may have found themselves being outcompeted by pack hunting carnivorans, arguing that the larger, more complex brains of the cooperative carnivorans would have prevented the large hyainailourines from effectively defending their kills. However, studies have found that brain size has no correlation with sociality in carnivorans, with the relative size of the anterior brain within carnivoran families playing a larger role in sociality. Due to the absence of canids (who dispersed into Africa by the latest Miocene), it is difficult to assess pack hunting among carnivorans in Early Miocene Africa, as dog-like carnivorans, such as Lycyaena, only appeared during the Late Miocene. It is also unknown if larger amphicyonids practiced any cooperative hunting. Furthermore, vegetation in the Early Miocene was generally more closed, preventing pack hunting or high speed chases from being effective.

== Reason for asymmetry ==
The asymmetry between the Eurasian and Afro-Arabian fauna was due to the rapid diversification and dispersal of the Eurasian fauna. Additionally, the diversity of Afro-Arabian fauna was vastly lower compared to the Eurasian fauna. Despite the lower diversity of the Afro-Arabian fauna, the fauna did not decline immediately following the interchange. Another reason for the asymmetry was abiotic factors as environmental changes. During the Late Eocene to Early Oligocene, open, arid habitats became more common replacing the once predominant densely forested localities. Forested conditions during the Early Miocene gave way to mixed forest-grassland conditions in the Middle Miocene. Isotope studies found wet rainforests in many areas, suggesting a mixed of savannas and forests across East Africa. Open habitats created a strong barrier towards Afro-Arabian fauna from dispersing into Eurasia, which likely limited their dispersals into Eurasia. Additionally, the appearance of open environments say the decline of hyainailouroids in Namibia during the Early Miocene due to their inability to adapt to savannas, steppes, and deserts. The asymmetry among carnivorans and hyaenodonts was probably due to the differences in their locomotor abilities as hyaenodonts such as Hyainailouros still had the archaic locomotion which was more similar to ungulates than to carnivorans.
