= Namatherium =

Namatherium Temporal range: Middle Eocene–Late Eocene

Scientific classification
- Kingdom: Animalia
- Phylum: Chordata
- Class: Mammalia
- Order: †Embrithopoda
- Family: †Arsinoitheriidae
- Genus: †Namatherium; Pickford Senut Morales Mein & Sanchez, 2008

Species
- N blackcrowense (Pickford Senut Morales Mein & Sanchez, 2008)

Extinct genus of arsinotheriid mammal

Namatherium is a genus of basal arsinoitheriid embrithopod from Eocene Namibia.

== Description ==
Namatherium is only known from cranial remains, but the genus was likely similar to Arsinoitherium in general appearance. The shape of Namatherium's skull is unknown, as the horns are not preserved in the fossil, though it is speculated that they possessed them due to the nasal butresses that the skull has.

=== Skull ===
While being similar to Arsinoitherium in some aspects, the skull of Namatherium is drastically different in some aspects. The zygomatic arches of Namatherium flare outwards laterally. There is an infraorbital foramen above the fourth premolar, as well as a palatine foramen behind the third molar. The maxilla makes up the anterior border of the orbit. The shape and position of the foramen magnum is like that in Arsinoitherium, while the anatomy of the exoccipital differs wildly from the genus, with the bony ridge of the exoccipital of Namatherium being significantly smaller than that of Arsinoitherium. The infraorbital canal is shortened, similar to the condition present in Stylolophus. The maxillo-jugal suture of Namatherium is complex and not straight, as is the intermaxillary suture.

=== Dentition ===
Namatherium has monolophodont upper premolars and bilophodont molars. The lower molars exhibit hyper-dilambdodonty.

== Taxonomy ==
Namatherium is currently grouped closest to Arsinoitherium within the Embrithopoda, rather than the Eurasian embrithopods. The name of the genus is derived from the Nama region of Namibia, where the fossils were discovered.
