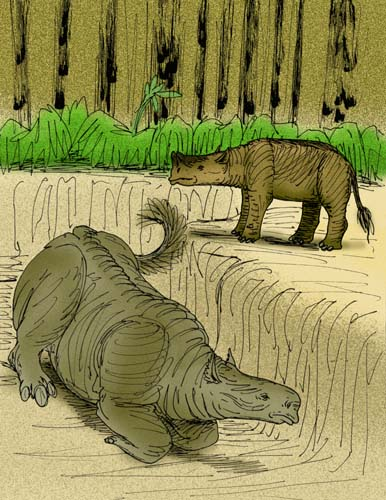
- Brachydiastematherium transylvanicum and Crivadiatherium mackennai

Scientific classification
- Kingdom: Animalia
- Phylum: Chordata
- Class: Mammalia
- Order: †Embrithopoda
- Family: †Palaeoamasiidae
- Genus: †Crivadiatherium; Radulesco, Iliesco & Iliesco 1976

Species
- C. iliescui Radulesco & Sudre, 1985; C. mackennai Radulesco, Iliesco & Iliesco, 1976; C. sahini Métais, 2024; C. sevketseni Métais, 2024

= Crivadiatherium =

Crivadiatherium Temporal range: Middle Eocene–Early Oligocene

Extinct genus of mammals

Crivadiatherium is an extinct genus of palaeoamasiid mammal from the middle Eocene to early Oligocene of Eurasia. Fossil remains—teeth and mandible fragments—are known from the Crivadia site in the Hațeg depression, Romania.

== Description ==
The teeth of Crivadiatherium, compared with those of its relatives as Palaeoamasia from Turkey and Arsinoitherium from Egypt, shows features more primitive, with lower molars without lobes and less bilophodont. The molars of Eurasian embrithopods are smaller than those of later derived African arsinoitheres. It is probable that Crivadiatherium lived in lacustrine environments, maybe eating abrasive plants.
