= List of animals with horns or tusks =

This is a list of animals that have hard permanent pointed projections on their head.

== Horns ==
Horns are keratinous projections that grow out from the top of the head. Mammals with horns include:

- Ruminant artiodactyls
  - Antilocapridae (pronghorns)
  - Bovidae (cattle, goats, antelopes etc.). Bovid horns are often called "true horns," characterized by a bony core surrounded by a keratin sheath.
- Giraffidae: Giraffids have a pair of skin-covered bony protrusions on their heads called ossicones.
- Cervidae: Most deer have antlers, which are not true horns due to their lack of a keratin sheath.
- Rhinocerotidae: The "horns" of rhinos are made of keratin and lack a bone core.
- Arsinoitheriidae (extinct)

Some other animals have features that resemble horns but differ structurally from mammalian horns. These including some chameleons, vipers, owls, frogs, boxfishes, and rhinoceros beetles.

== Tusks ==
Tusks are pointed elongated teeth that protrude from the mouth and sometimes resemble horns. They continuously grow throughout the animal's life. Examples include:

- Proboscidea (elephants)
- Walruses
- Warthogs
- Narwhals
- Water deer
