= Palaeoamasiidae =

Palaeoamasiidae Temporal range: Middle Eocene

Scientific classification
- Kingdom: Animalia
- Phylum: Chordata
- Class: Mammalia
- Order: †Embrithopoda
- Family: †Palaeoamasiidae; Şen & Heintz 1979

Genera
- See text

Extinct family of mammals

Palaeoamasiidae or Palaeoamasinae is an extinct taxon of embrithopod mammals that have been found in Romania and Anatolia where they lived on the shores of the Tethys Ocean.

== Classification ==
- †Palaeoamasiidae Şen & Heintz 1979
  - †Crivadiatherium Radulesco, Iliesco &Iliesco 1976
  - †Hypsamasia Maas, Thewissen & Kappelman 1998
  - †Palaeoamasia Ozansoy 1966
  - †Axainamasia
