= Tusk =

Elongated continuously growing front teeth

Tusks are elongated, continuously growing front teeth that protrude well beyond the mouth of certain mammal species. Most commonly known as canine teeth, as with narwhals, chevrotains, musk deer, water deer, muntjac, pigs, peccaries, hippopotamuses and walruses, or, in the case of elephants and hyrax, elongated incisors. Tusks share common features such as extra-oral position, growth pattern, composition and structure, and lack of contribution to ingestion. In most tusked species, both the males and the females have tusks, although males' are usually larger.

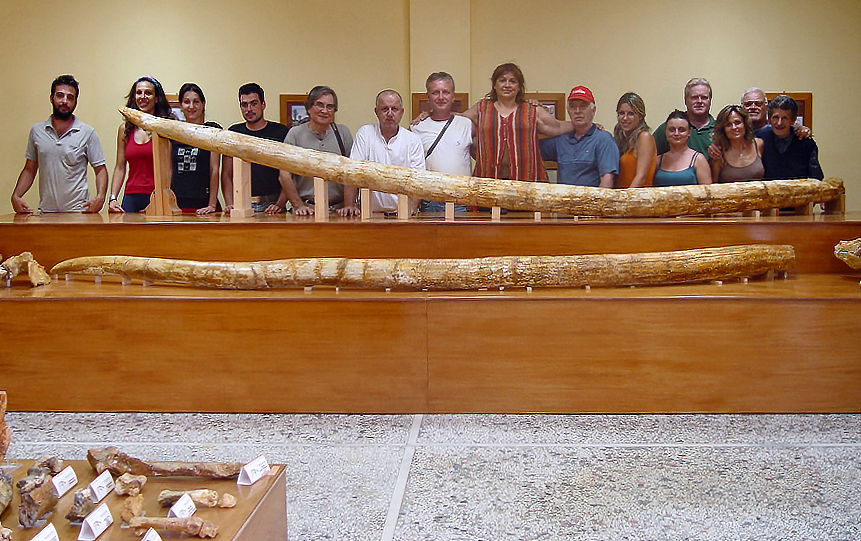
Tusks of the mastodon "Mammut" borsoni from Greece, which, reaching over 5 metres (16 ft) in length, are the longest tusks ever recorded.

Most mammals with tusks have a pair of them growing out from either side of the mouth. Tusks are generally curved and have a smooth, continuous surface. The male narwhal's straight single helical tusk, which usually grows out from the left of the mouth, is an exception to the typical features of tusks described above. Continuous growth of tusks is enabled by formative tissues in the apical openings of the roots of the teeth. Tusks vary in size: walrus tusks can reach over 95 centimetres (3.12 ft), narwhal tusks can reach 3 metres (9.8 ft), and the upward curving maxillary tusks of babirusa can reach lengths of over 20 centimetres (7.9 in).

Extinct mammals such as mammoths and mastodons exhibited a pair of large long upper tusks, both distant cousins of today's modern elephants. In contrast to mammals, dicynodonts are the only known vertebrates to have true tusks, tusks that grow continuously to perform species-specific functions as opposed to an enlarged tooth that resembles a traditional tusk and could be mistaken for one.

== Function ==
Tusks have a variety of uses depending on the animal. Social displays of dominance, particularly among males, are common, as is their use in defense against attackers. Elephants use their tusks as digging and boring tools. Walruses use their tusks to grip and haul themselves onto ice. It has been suggested that tusks' structure has evolved to be compatible with extra-oral environments.

== Species Diversity ==
=== Afro-tropical ===
==== Elephant ====
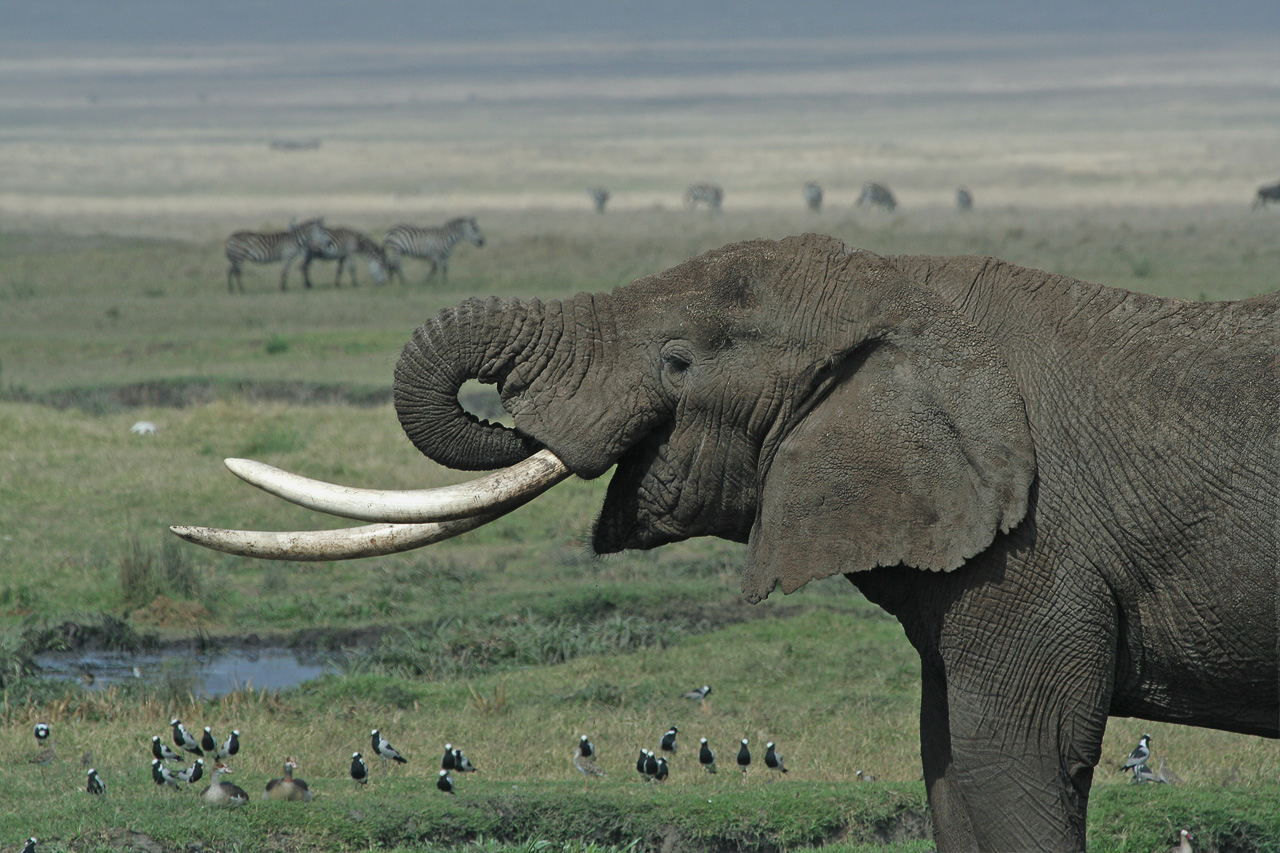
An African elephant in Tanzania, with visible tusks

Elephant tusks are sexually dimorphic, being on average larger in males than in females, and entirely absent in female Asian elephants. Elephants with large tusks each at least 45 kilograms (99 lb) in weight are known as "tuskers", sometimes also called "big tuskers" or "great tuskers". While tuskers are rare today, it is thought that they were more common in the past, prior to human impact on elephant populations. The two record holders for longest and heaviest recorded African bush elephant tusks are around 3.49 metres (11.5 ft) long measured along the outside curve, and 107 kilograms (236 lb) in weight respectively, while the longest and heaviest Asian elephant tusks are 3.26 metres (10.7 ft) long and 73 kilograms (161 lb) respectively. Even larger tusks are known from some extinct proboscideans (the broader group to which elephants belong), such as species of Stegodon, Palaeoloxodon, and mammoths, with the longest tusk ever recorded being that of a specimen of the gigantic mastodon "Mammut" borsoni from Greece, which measures 5.02 metres (16.5 ft) in length, with an estimated weight of 137 kilograms (302 lb) with some mammoth tusks exceeding 4 metres (13 ft) in length and probably 200 kilograms (440 lb) in weight. The largest walrus tusks can reach lengths of over 95 centimetres (3.12 ft). The longest narwhal tusks reach 3 metres (9.8 ft). The upward curving maxillary tusks of babirusa can reach lengths of over 20 centimetres (7.9 in).

==== Hyrax ====
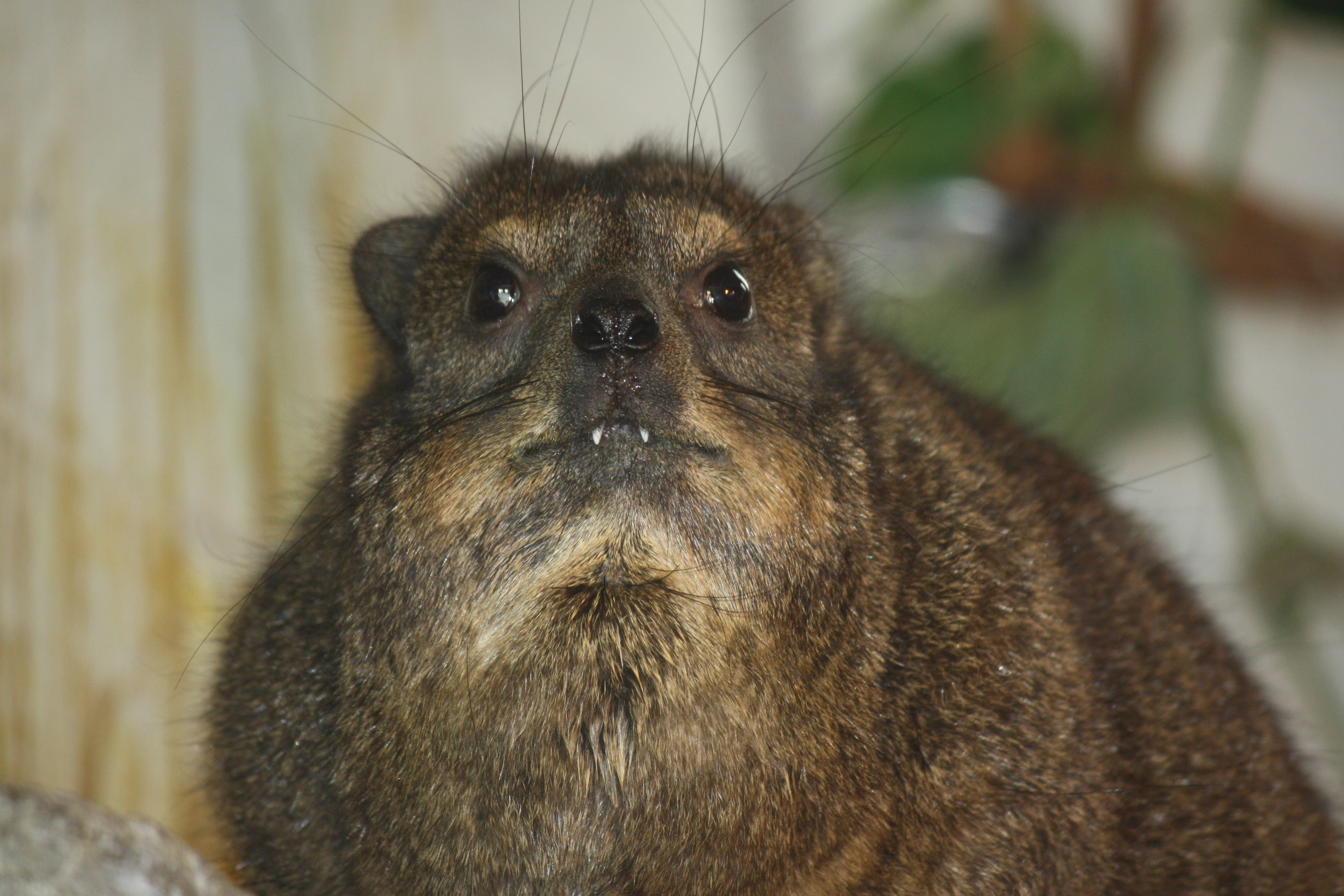
Hyrax tusks

In contrast to the variety of large sized tusks, there are tusks that are small and unassuming within the Paenungulata (elephants, sirenians, and hyraxes) clade. The Hyrax, a herbivorous mammal commonly found in Ethiopia and southern Africa, exhibit ever-growing tusk-like incisors. Hyrax tusks are hypertrophied. They have grown to be enlarged far beyond what is considered typical for the average tooth. While they are not considered true tusks like in elephants, the hyrax tusk-like incisors have overgrown to the point of the traditional tusk-like appearance. Composed of only dentin and a thin layer of enamel, the hyrax tusks are triangular in shape and serve no observed function for feeding. Instead, the hyrax tusk is used for defending against predators, as well as social displays between sexes.

==== Hippo ====
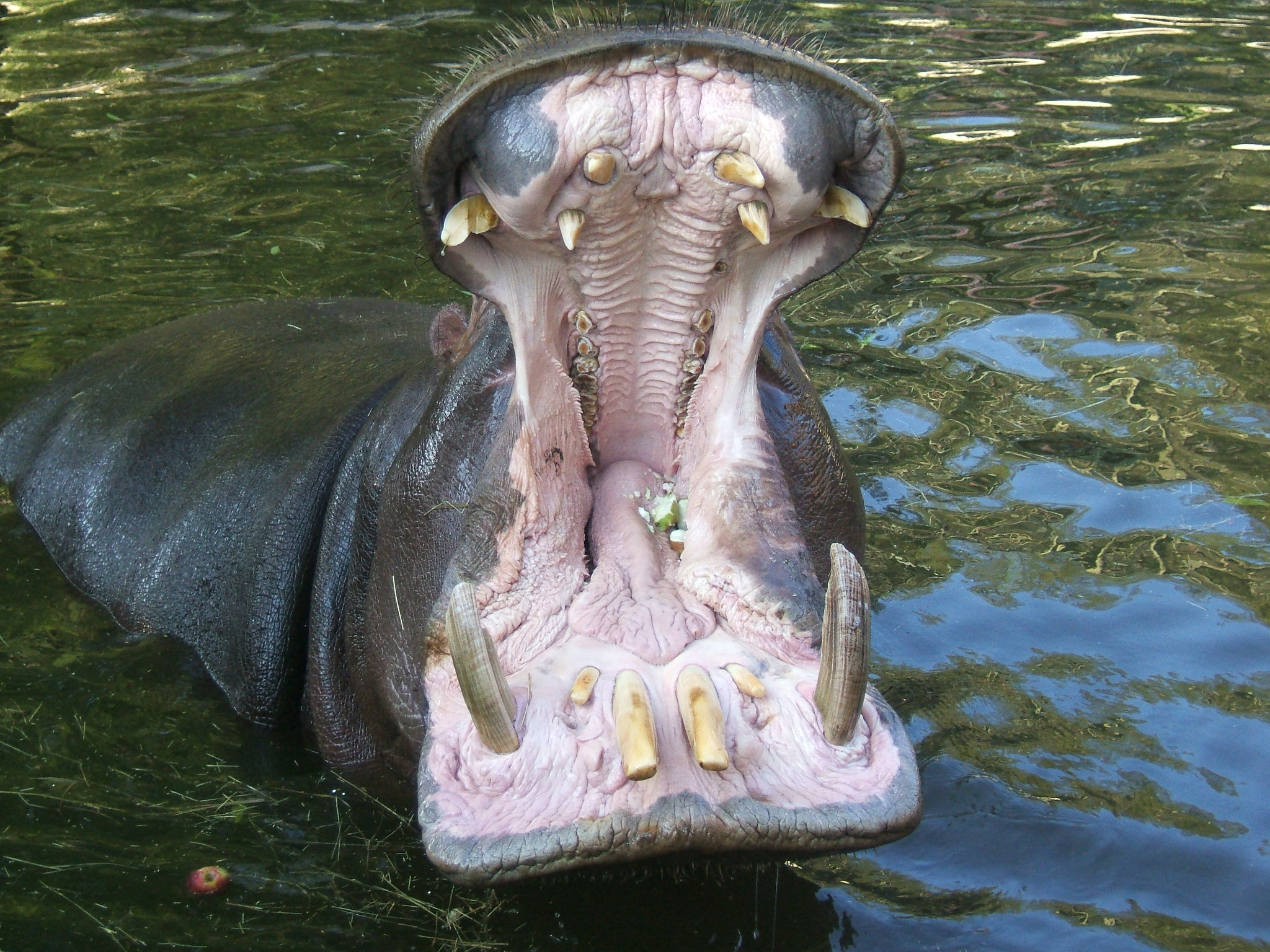
Hippo Tusks

Hippopotamus tusks are derived from lower canine teeth, composed of an outer layer, cementum, and an interior of dentine, or ivory. Being hypselodont, the tusks and incisors of the Hippopotamus are ever growing and rootless, allowing for continual rejuvenation through everyday wear and tear through diet and defensive mechanisms like fighting, and sharpening from the vertical motion against the shorter upper canines. The size of the tusk is a sexual-dimorphic trait, with the tusk of males growing up to 50 cm (1.5 ft), double the size of female tusks. Despite the link between sexual dimorphism and the length of the tusk, both males and females may use tusks in aggressive or defensive interactions, including in infraspecific conflicts and calf defence. Such attacking mechanisms include tusk clashes, slashes, bites, and jutting out the lower jaws, however, due to the stocky stature of the Hippopotamus, head-to-head clashes tend to involve locking teeth and wrestling.

=== Eurasian ===
==== Wild Boars ====
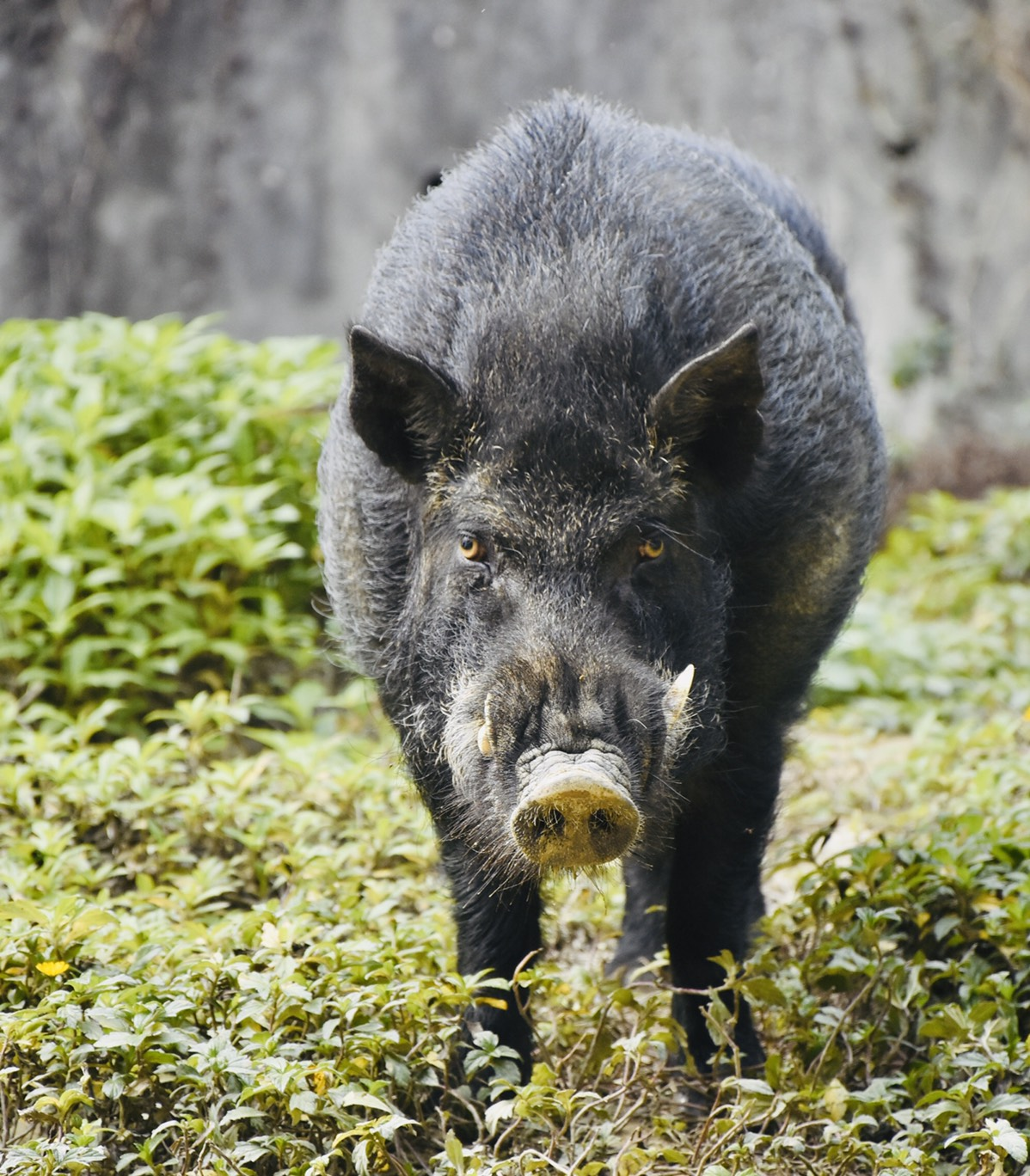
Formosan wild boar showing upper canine tusks curving upwards.

Wild boars are one of the most widespread groups of species in the world as they are found natively to Eurasia, and have been introduced to every other continent besides Antarctica. There are many different species of wild boars that take up different ecological niches in the world including deserts, grasslands, forested regions, and more. Wild boars are typically omnivorous and have a range of different diets depending on season and habitat. In wild boar species the upper and lower canines are ever-growing tusks made of 80% dentin covered in enamel, and a large centre pulp cavity. The lower canine tusk is often longer than the upper canine tusk, but is kept short due to the upper canine wearing down the bottom, preventing overgrowth into the mouth cavity. There is often sexual dimorphism present in wild boar species, with differences in overall body size (smaller females), and smaller canine tusks in females. The upper canines in males will often curve upwards and dorsally, which differs from female upper canines that extend laterally. The presence of canine tusks have a number of uses such as defence, dominance displays for mating, and to root and forage for food.

==== Ruminants ====
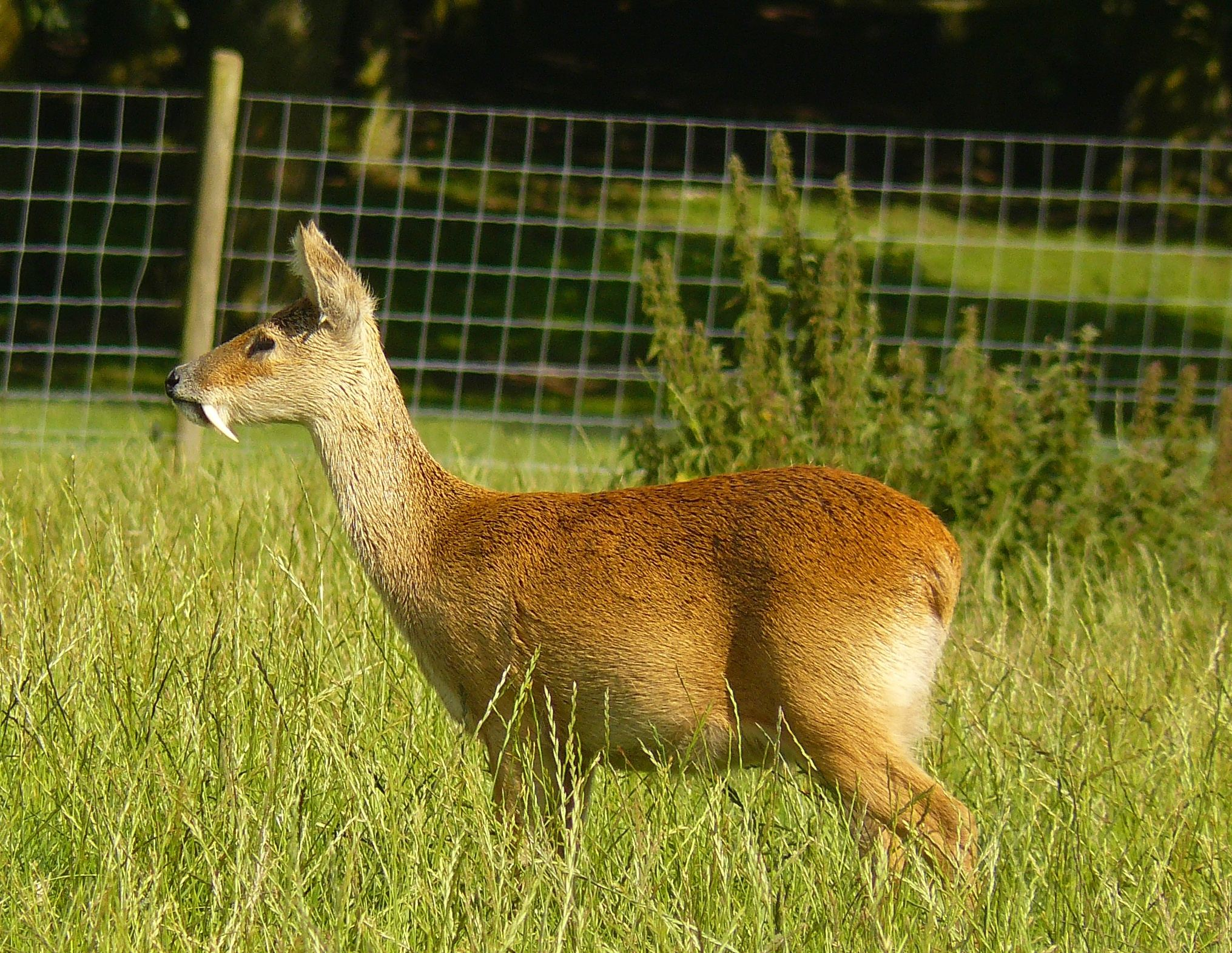
Chinese Water deer

Ruminantia are often remembered for their horns, but there are also a few unique species with prominent upper canine tusks. Species such as the musk deer, tufted deer, Chinese water deer, and reeves muntjac all have upper canine tusks. In these species there is a clear sexual dimorphism with the female canine tusks being significantly reduced compared to the male tusks. The pronounced upper canines in males are typically used in aggressive encounters with other males. A hypothesized reason for having enlarged canine tusks for intra-specific competition, instead of horns normally associated with ruminants, is due to the size of animal and their type of habitat. Larger ruminants with more elaborate horns or head ornaments often live in open environments, and ruminants with tusks are often smaller and live in denser habitats where head ornaments may not be beneficial.

=== Arctic Marine ===
==== Walrus ====
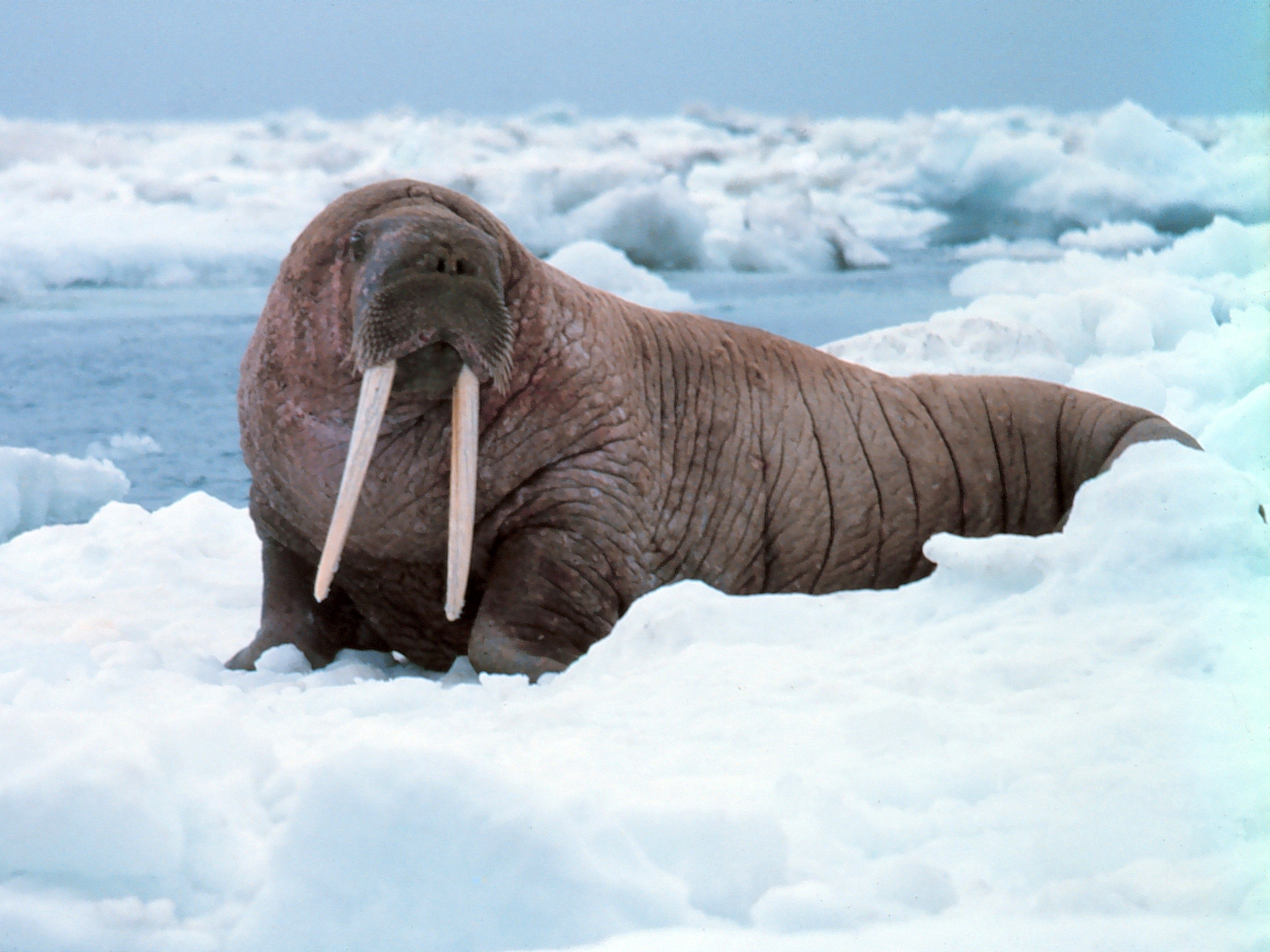

Walruses also known as Odobenus rosmarus meaning "tooth walker", refers to a behaviour of using tusks to pull themselves up onto ice. There are three known subspecies of walruses relating to their geographic ranges within the Arctic: the pacific walrus (Odobenus rosmarus divergens), the atlantic walrus (Odobenus rosmarus rosmarus), and the laptev walrus being the smallest subspecies found in the Laptev sea (Odobarus rosmarus laptevi).

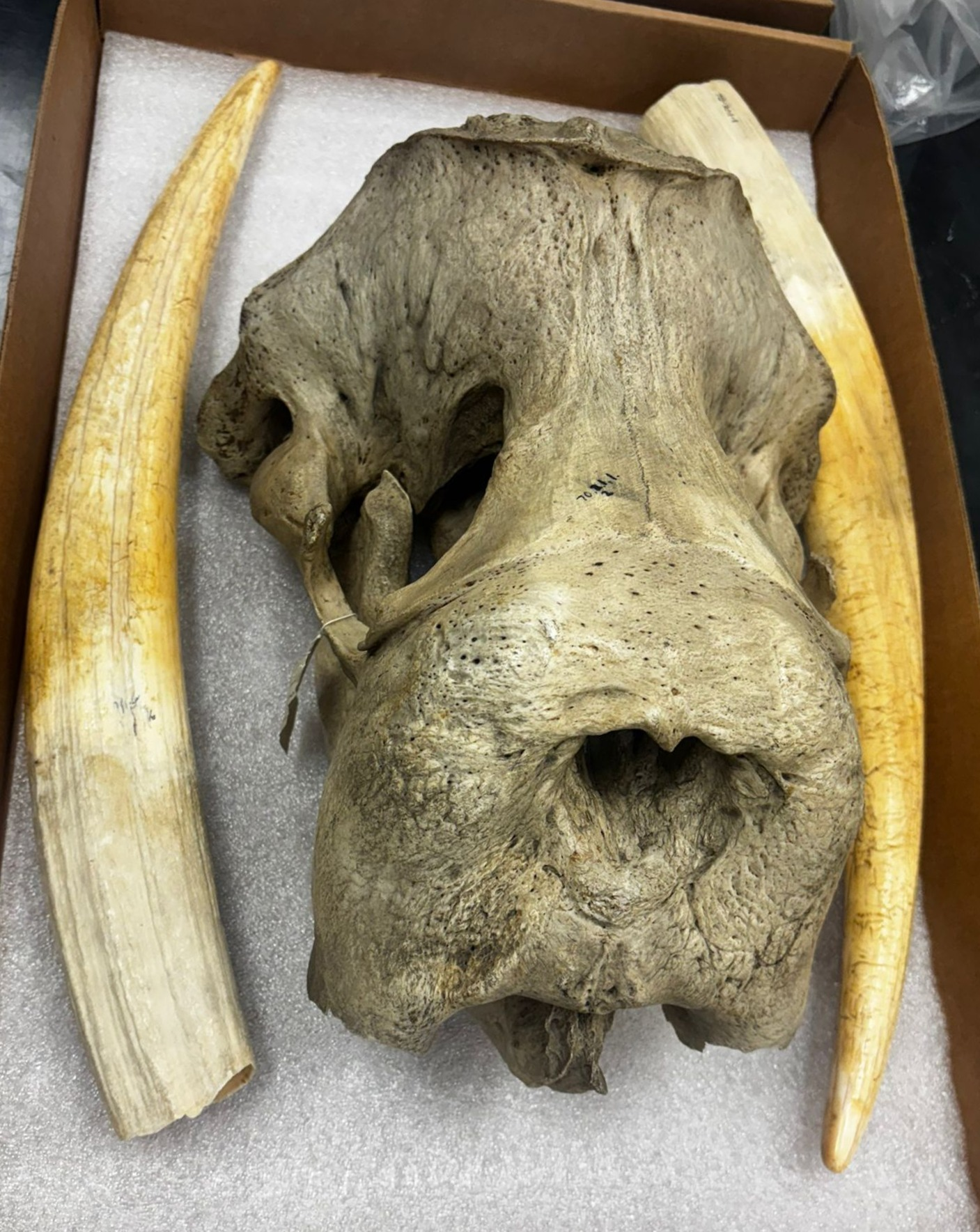
Walrus skull and tusks

Walruses are pinnipeds a clade within the order Carnivora, characterizing these enlarged maxillary tusks as canines. Walrus tusks are described as aradicular hypsodont (elodont) teeth, meaning they develop and erupt continuously while having no true roots. Tusks are embedded within the jaw by the periodontium, composed of different layers as seen in elephants and hippos, with a cementum outer layer and a dentin (ivory) inner layer. Tusks are conical in shape with a flat palatal aspect, aiding in resistance to luxation. Commonly these tusks are used to aid in movement like hauling themselves out of water onto ice or breaking through thick ice, rarely using them to hunt as they feed on small invertebrates like molluscs.

Walrus tusks can be characterized as sexually dimorphic, males exhibit large canine tusks that can grow up to 100cm, while female have smaller tusks growing up to 80cm. Differences associated with mating behaviours and competition between other males. Walruses exhibit polygynous mating systems, where one male mates with multiple females. To defend these territories of females, males will use tusks to establish dominance and fight if needed. Thus tusks play an important role in social interactions and reproductive success.

== Human use and ivory trade ==
Tusks are used by humans to produce ivory, which is used in artifacts and jewellery, and formerly in other items such as piano keys. Consequently, many tusk-bearing species have been hunted commercially and several are endangered. The ivory trade has been severely restricted by the United Nations Convention on International Trade in Endangered Species of Wild Fauna and Flora (CITES). While commercial trade of elephant ivory is banned in countries like the United States, many species such as walruses, hippopotamuses, and narwhals can be regulated under domestic restrictions and may still be legal under certain international laws like CITES.

A common practice seen by Alaska Native peoples' in the United States is harvesting marine mammals such as Pacific walruses. A common misconception is that walruses are poached for their ivory like elephants. However, Native communities use the whole animal for food, clothing, and materials for everyday life. Walrus ivory tusks are an additional way to use the every part of the animal, harvesting the tusks to create Native handicrafts, accounting for half the annual income of 42% of artisans. The Marine Mammal Protection Act in the US, permits communities to sell or trade authentic handicrafts. Organizations such as WWF support legislations ARTIST Act and Archie Cavanaugh Migratory Bird Treaty Amendment Act, addressing any legal or economic challenges Indigenous communities may face while creating handicrafts. Providing Indigenous cultural practices autonomy and legal protection, maintaining artistic traditions that use legally obtained walrus ivory.

Fossil ivory such as mammoth tusks came into high demand following international restrictions on the elephant ivory trade. In the Russian Arctic region of northeastern Siberia (Yakutia) live the Indigenous people of the Republic of Sakha, where mammoth tusk collection provides income to these local communities. However, environmental concerns relating to extraction methods may cause damage to tundra landscapes and permafrost.

Tusked animals in human care may undergo tusk trimming or removal for health and safety concerns. Furthermore, surgical veterinary procedures to remove tusks have been explored to mitigate human-wildlife conflicts.

== Gallery ==
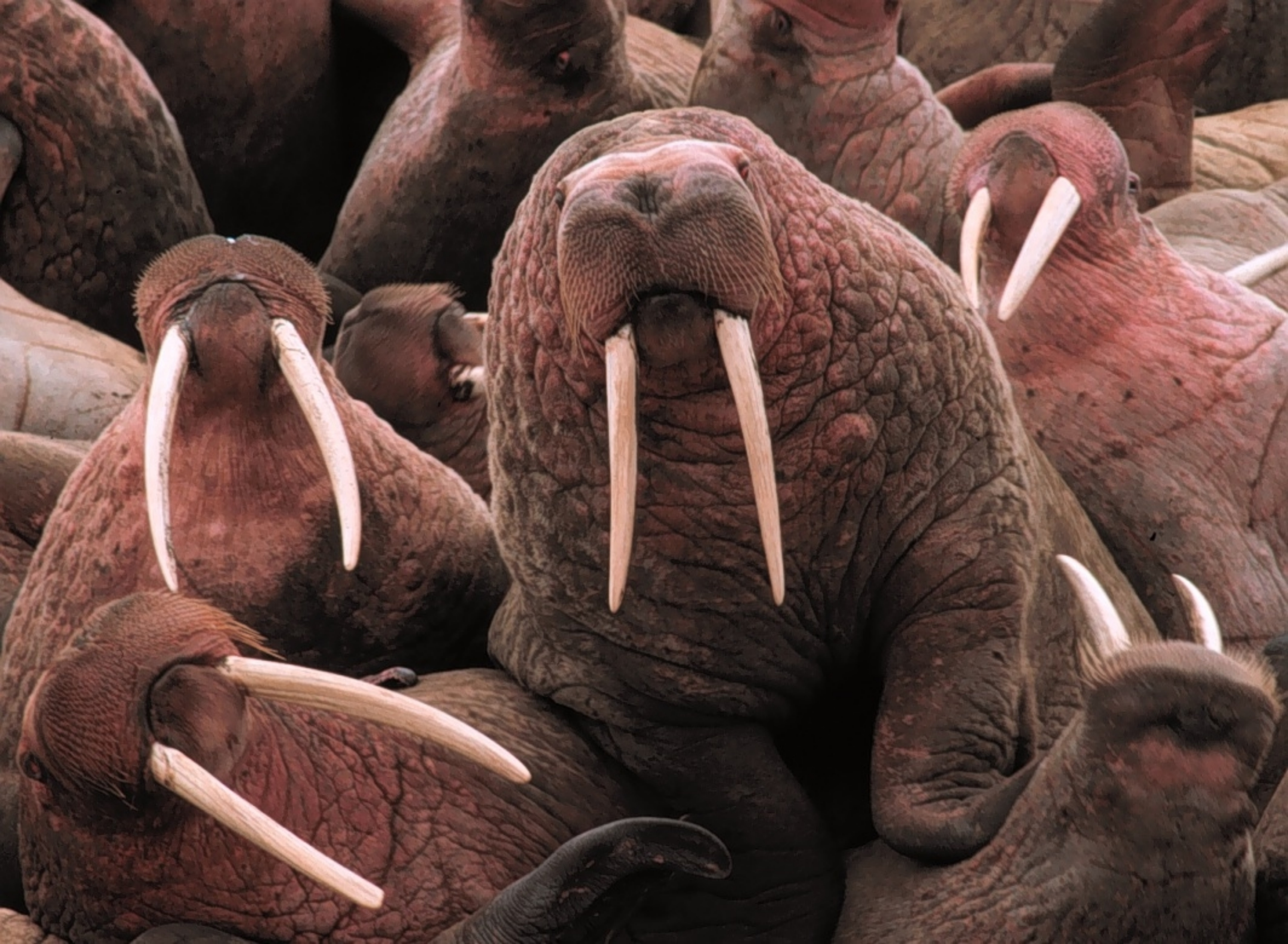
Walruses

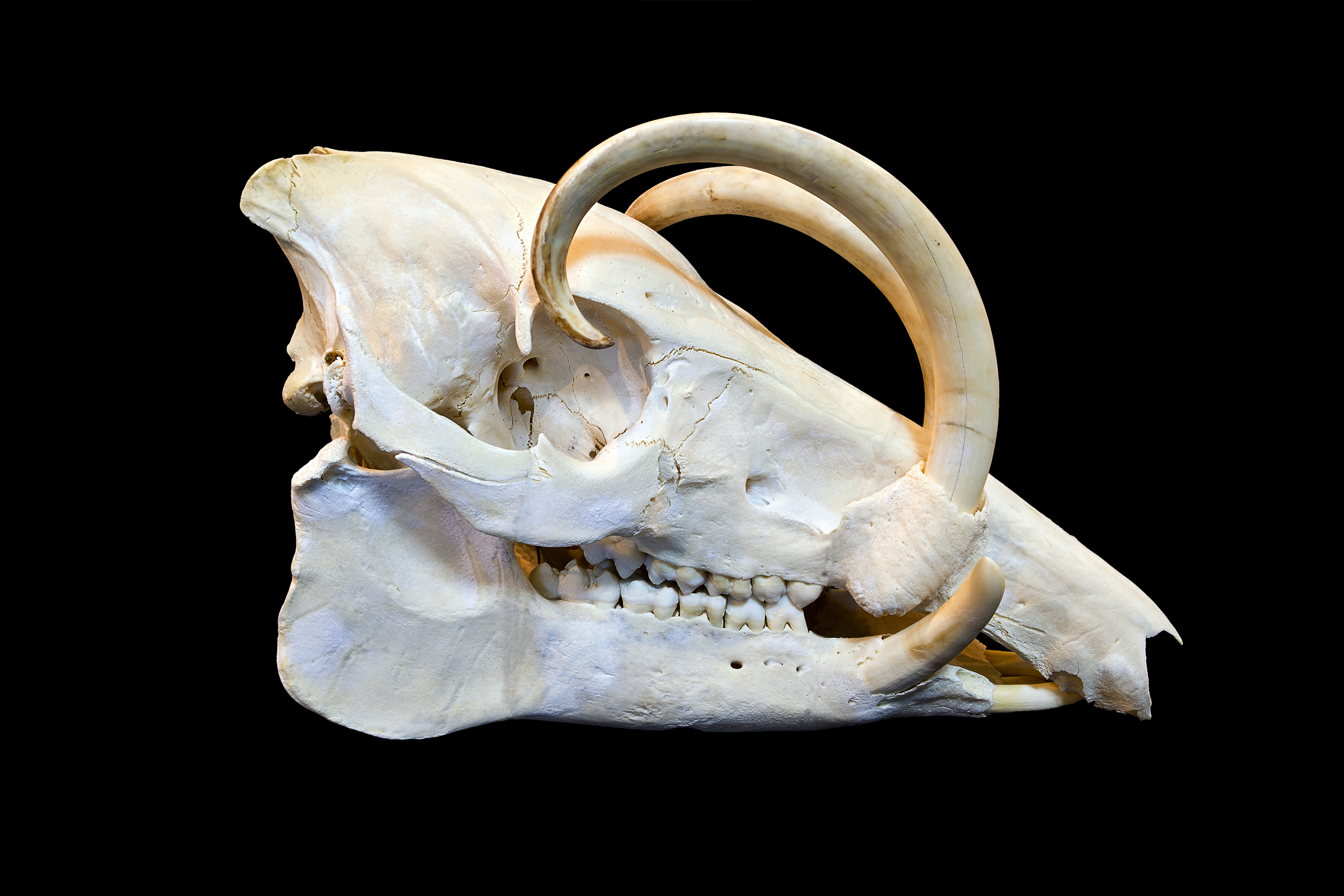
Skull of Babyrousa celebensis, showing long upward curving canine tusks

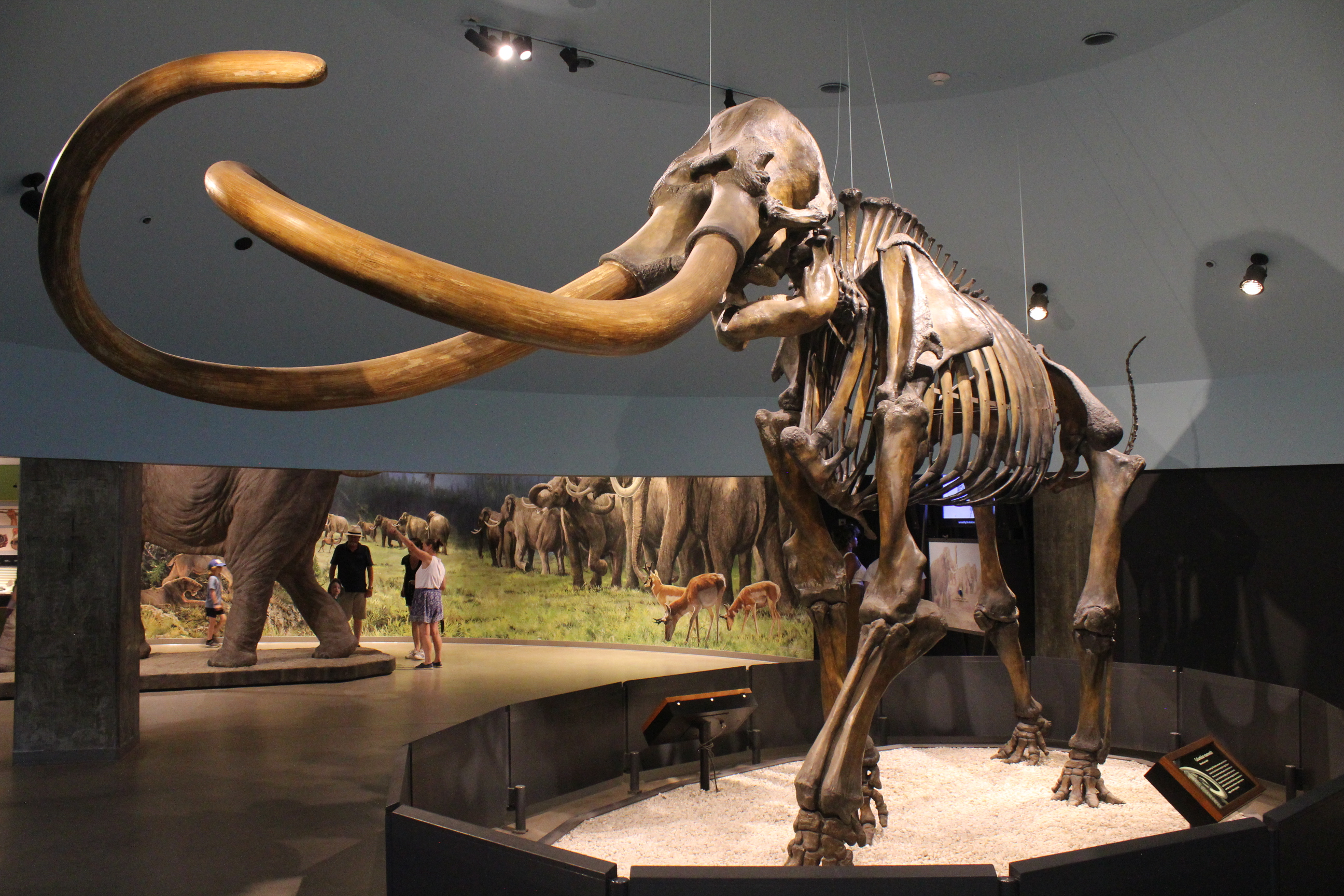
Columbian mammoth

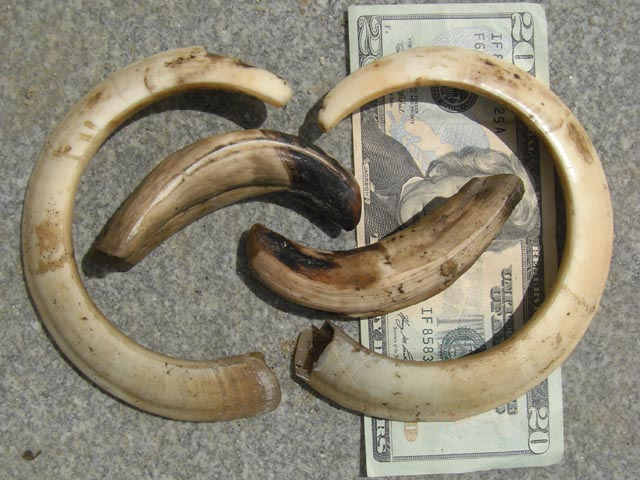
Tusks of a wild boar

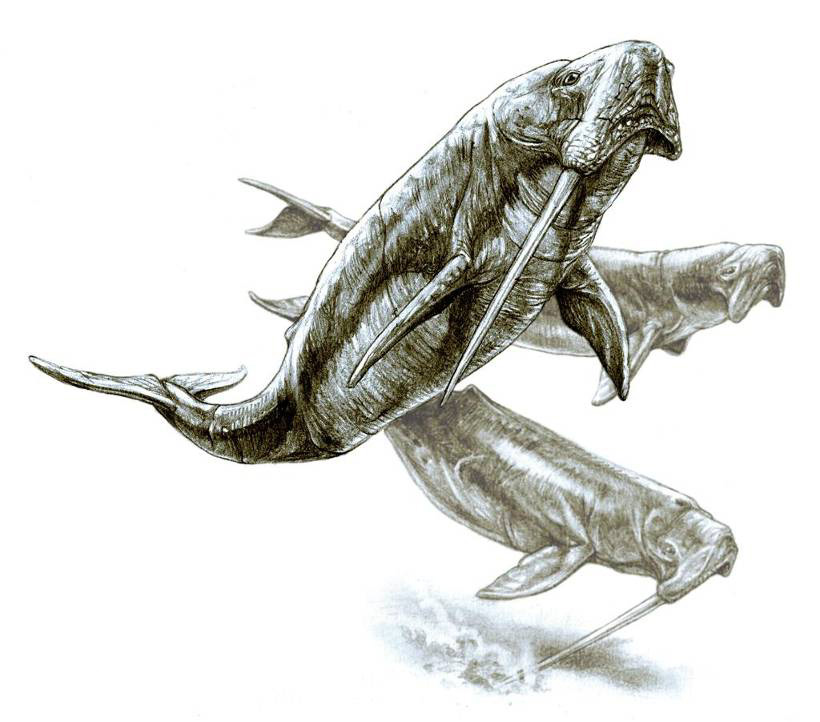
Odobenocetops, an extinct whale with a long single tusk

== See also ==
- List of animals with horns or tusks
- Fang, a long canine tooth (in mammals)
- Ivory trade
- Eco-economic decoupling
- Elephant vs. Walrus Ivory conservation and use
