= Axainamasia =

Axainamasia Temporal range: Eocene-Oligocene

Scientific classification
- Kingdom: Animalia
- Phylum: Chordata
- Class: Mammalia
- Infraclass: Placentalia
- Order: †Embrithopoda
- Genus: †Axainamasia
- Species: †A. sandersi

Binomial name
- †Axainamasia sandersi Métais et al., 2024

Extinct genus of embrithopod

Axainamasia is an extinct genus of embrithopod that lived in Balkanatolia during the Palaeogene period. It contains the species A. sandersi.
