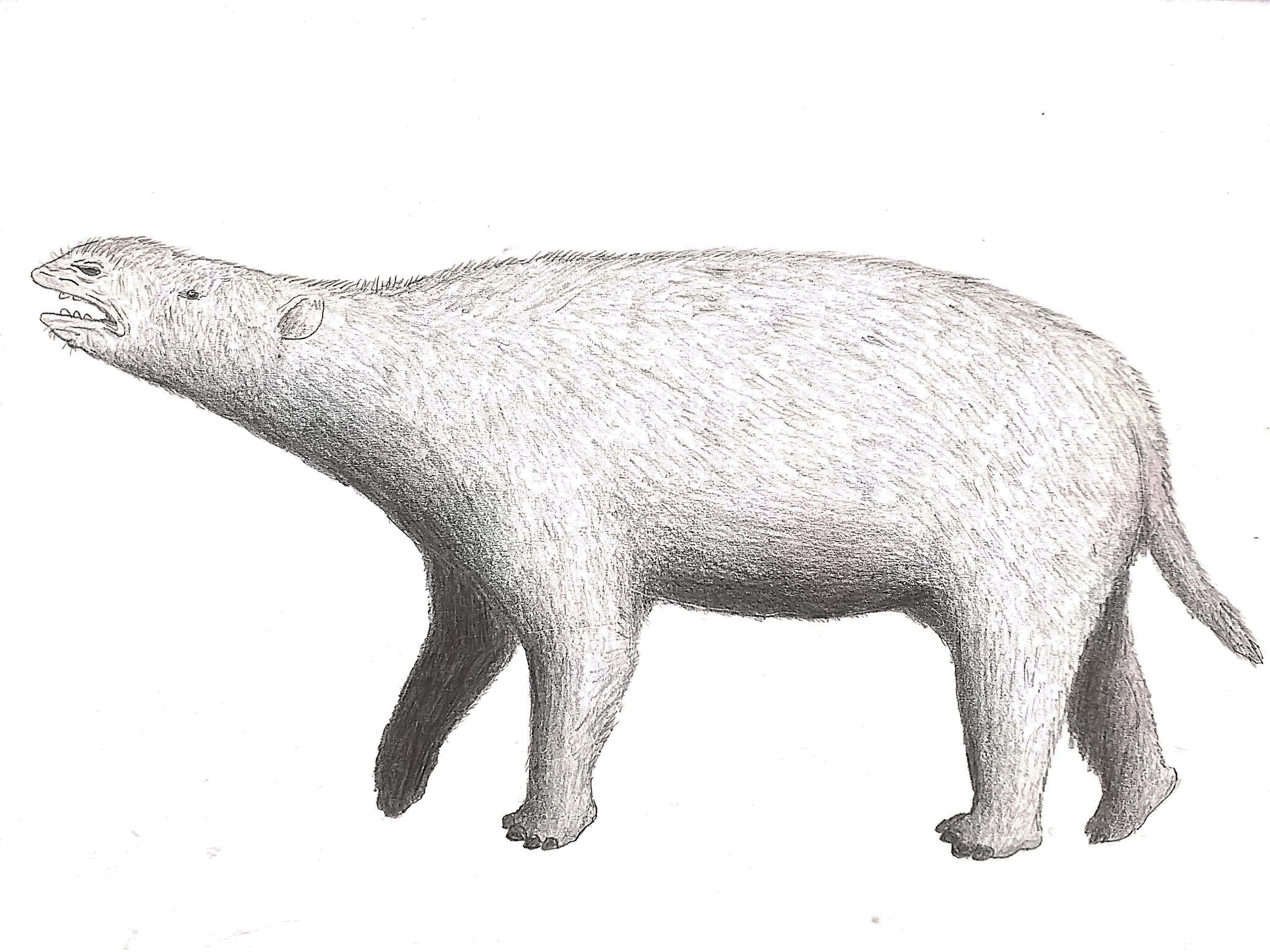
- Life reconstruction of S. minor

Scientific classification
- Kingdom: Animalia
- Phylum: Chordata
- Class: Mammalia
- Infraclass: Placentalia
- Order: †Embrithopoda
- Genus: †Stylolophus; Gheerbrant et al., 2018

Species
- S. minor (Gheerbrant et al., 2018)

= Stylolophus =

Stylolophus Temporal range: Ypresian–Ypresian

Extinct genus of mammals

Stylolophus is a genus of basal embrithopod from Eocene Africa. There is one described species, S. minor, and one indeterminate specimen.

== Description ==
Stylolophus is considerably less derived than its more famous relative, Arsinoitherium. Stylolophus lacked any prominent nasal horn. The anterior lower incisors were enlarged and pointed outwards from the jaw. Like all other embrithopods, the molars of Stylolophus are hyperdilambdodont. The body mass of S.minor is estimated to be 31 kg, whilst the indeterminate specimen is thought to weigh around 60–88 kg.
