= Hypsamasia =

Hypsamasia Temporal range: Middle Eocene

Scientific classification
- Domain: Eukaryota
- Kingdom: Animalia
- Phylum: Chordata
- Class: Mammalia
- Order: †Embrithopoda
- Family: †Palaeoamasiidae
- Genus: †Hypsamasia; Maas, Thewissen & Kappelman 1998
- Species: †H. seni

Binomial name
- †Hypsamasia seni Maas, Thewissen & Kappelman 1998

Species of mammal (fossil)

Hypsamasia is an extinct embrithopod mammal that lived during the middle Eocene. Dental remains of this herbivore have been found in the Kartal Formation near the village Saribeylar (40.1°N 32.7°E, paleocoordinates 38.2°N 28.2°E) north of Ankara in what is today Anatolia.

Hypsamasia seni was named in reference to its high crowned cheek teeth (Greek: hypsos, "height"), the type locality (the Roman town and province Amasya), and after Dr Sevket Sen for his important contribution to the paleontology and geology of western Asia.

Hypsamasia differs from Palaeoamasia in its larger size and the highly crowned teeth. Other, unnamed embrithopods have been found in the Kartal Formation. Embrithopods are best known from northern Africa, but their range encompassed Central Africa, the Arabian Peninsula, and Romania. The Turkish paleoamasiids are older and are therefore assumed to be more primitive.
