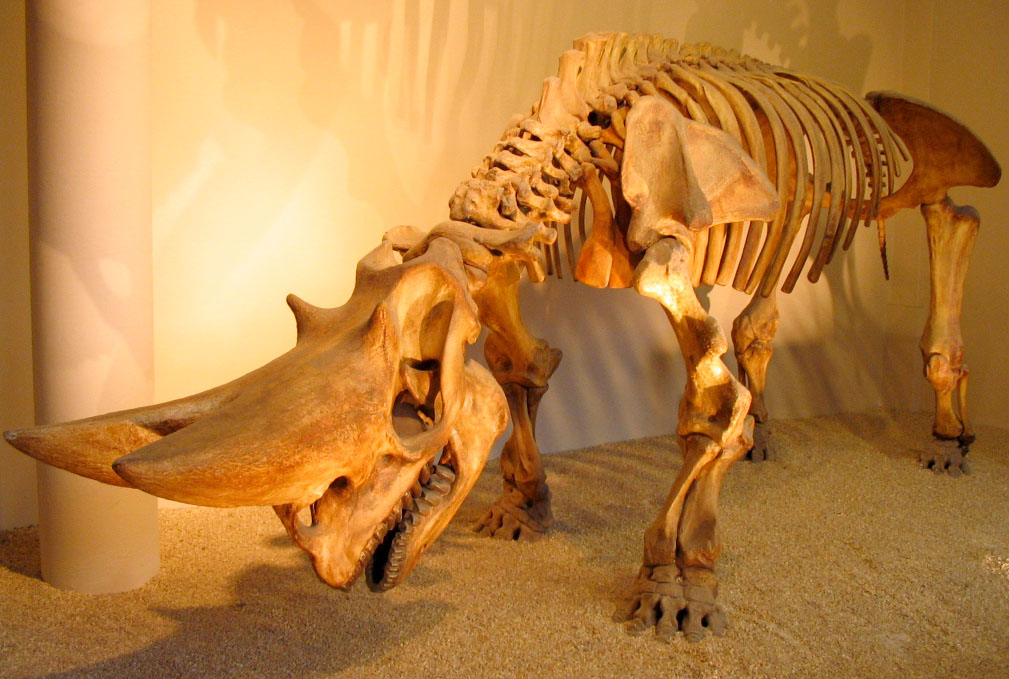
- Arsinoitherium zitteli

Scientific classification
- Kingdom: Animalia
- Phylum: Chordata
- Class: Mammalia
- Clade: Paenungulatomorpha
- Grandorder: Paenungulata
- Mirorder: Tethytheria
- Order: †Embrithopoda; Andrews 1906

Families
- †Stylolophus; †Arsinoitheriidae; †Palaeoamasiidae

= Embrithopoda =

Embrithopoda Temporal range: Paleocene - Oligocene, 56–28 Ma

Order of extinct placental mammals

Embrithopoda ("heavy-footed" in Ancient Greek) is an order of extinct paenungulate mammals known from Asia, Africa and Eastern Europe. Most of the embrithopod genera are known exclusively from jaws and teeth dated from the late Paleocene to the late Eocene; however, the order is best known from its terminal member, the large Arsinoitherium.

== Description ==
While embrithopods bore a superficial resemblance to rhinoceroses, their horns had bony cores covered in keratinized skin. Not all embrithopods possessed horns, either. Despite their appearance, they have been regarded as related to elephants or sirenians, not perissodactyls.

== Origins and distribution ==
As tethytheres, the Embrithopoda have been believed to be part of the clade Afrotheria. However, a study of the basal arsinoitheriid, Palaeoamasia, suggests that embrithopods are not tethytheres or even paenungulates, and that they need to be better sampled in an analysis of eutherian relationships to clarify if they are afrotherians. It is also not clear if embrithopods originated in Africa or Eurasia. However, recent findings demonstrate an African origin for embrithopods and furthermore a relationship with other paenungulates, albeit having diverged earlier than previously thought.

Fossils of embrithopods, such as Arsinoitherium, have been found in Egypt, Ethiopia, Kenya, Morocco, Mongolia, Turkey, Romania, Namibia, Tunisia and Croatia. Until the 1970s, only Arsinoitherium itself was known, appearing isolated in the fossil record.

== Classification ==
McKenna & Manning 1977 and McKenna & Bell 1997 considered Phenacolophus from Mongolia a primitive embrithopod, although this attribution was challenged by several other authors. A 2016 cladistic study found Phenacolophus as a stem-perissodactyl and the embrithopods at the base of Altungulata. More recently, an afrothere identity has been vindicated, albeit more basal than previously assumed.

Order Embrithopoda Andrews 1906 sensu Prothero & Schoch 1989 (=Barypoda Andrews 1904)

- Genus †Stylolophus Gheerbrant et al, 2018
- Family †Arsinoitheriidae Andrews 1904
  - Genus †Namatherium Pickford et al., 2008
  - Genus †Arsinoitherium Beadnell 1902
- Family †Palaeoamasiidae Şen & Heintz 1979
  - Genus †Hypsamasia Maas, Thewissen & Kappelman 1998
  - Genus †Palaeoamasia Ozansoy 1966
  - Genus †Crivadiatherium Radulesco, Iliesco & Iliesco 1976
