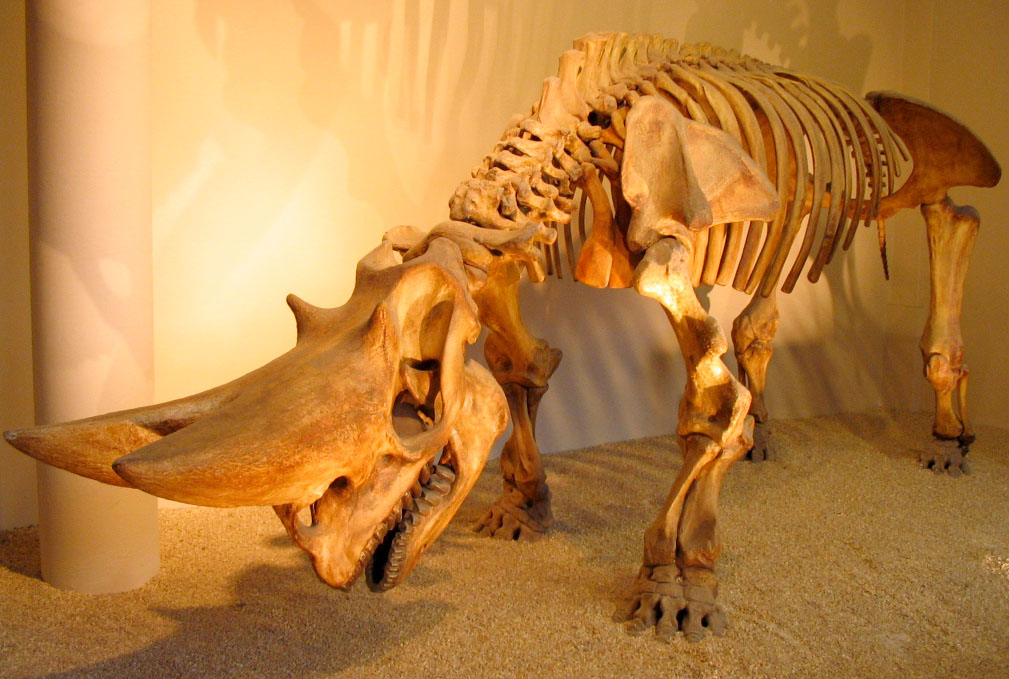
- A. zitteli cast, Natural History Museum, London

Scientific classification
- Kingdom: Animalia
- Phylum: Chordata
- Class: Mammalia
- Order: †Embrithopoda
- Family: †Arsinoitheriidae
- Genus: †Arsinoitherium; Beadnell 1902

Type species
- Arsinoitherium zitteli (Beadnell, 1902)

Species
- A. zitteli Beadnell, 1902; A. giganteum Sanders et al., 2004

Synonyms
- A. andrewsi Lankester, 1903

= Arsinoitherium =

Arsinoitherium Temporal range: Late Eocene – Early Oligocene ~36–27 Ma

Extinct genus of mammals

Arsinoitherium (Arsinoe II's beast) is an extinct genus of paenungulate mammals belonging to the extinct order Embrithopoda. It is related to elephants, sirenians, and hyraxes. Arsinoitheres were superficially rhinoceros-like herbivores that lived during the Late Eocene and the Early Oligocene of North Africa from 36 to 30 million years ago, in areas of tropical rainforest and at the margin of mangrove swamps. A species described in 2004, A. giganteum, lived in Ethiopia about 27 million years ago.

Adults of the species A. zitteli stood around 1.75 m (5.7 ft) tall at the shoulders and 3 m (9.8 ft) in length. A. zitelli has been estimated to have weighed anywhere from 510–1,500 kg (1,120–3,310 lb), whereas A. giganteum estimates range from 1,760–1,960 kg (3,880–4,320 lb). The most noticeable features of Arsinoitherium were a pair of enormous horns above the nose and a second pair of tiny knob-like horns over the eyes. These were structurally similar to the horns of modern bovids. While reconstructions usually show them as similar to the ossicones of giraffes, in life each bony core may have been covered, like the horn cores of bovids, with a large horn of keratin. Both males and females had horns. While some investigators have described a larger and a smaller species from the same site, others have identified the difference in body and tooth size as sexual dimorphism.

Arsinoitherium superficially resembles a species of rhinoceros, but it is not closely related as it is not a perissodactyl; instead, their closest extant relatives are elephants and manatees. Fossils have been found in sediments deposited in coastal swamps and warm, humid, heavily vegetated lowland forests across what is now Africa and Arabia.

== Taxonomy ==
=== Early history ===
Arsinoitherium was named in 1902 by Hugh John Llewellyn Beadnell. The genus name Arsinoitherium comes from Pharaoh Arsinoe II (after whom the Faiyum Oasis, the region in which the first fossils were found, was called during the Ptolemaic Kingdom), and the Ancient Greek word θηρίον (thēríon), meaning "beast". The species epithet of the type species, A. zitteli, was given to it in honor of the eminent German paleontologist Karl Alfred Ritter von Zittel, regarded by some as the pioneer of paleontology in Egypt.

=== Classification ===
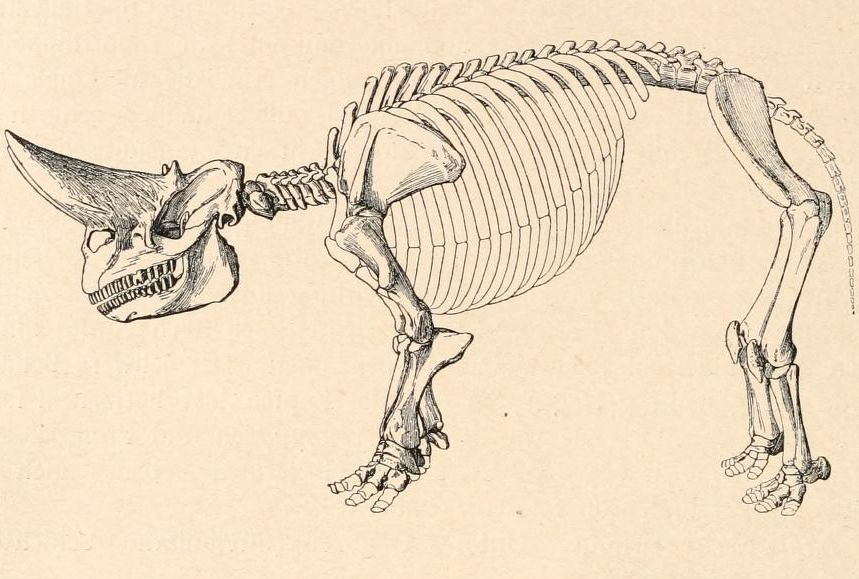
Skeletal reconstruction of Arsinoitherium

Originally considered an amblypod (an obsolete paraphyletic grouping), Arsinoitherium has been considered an aberrant proboscidean historically, and a member of an obsolete group named the Barypoda, composed of the genus and its relatives. Currently the genus is placed within the Embrithopoda, within the family Arsinoitheriidae. The best-known (and first-described) species is A. zitteli. Another species, A. giganteum, was discovered in the Ethiopian highlands of Chilga in 2003. The fossil teeth, far larger than those of A. zitteli, date to around 28–27 million years ago. While the Faiyum Oasis is the only site where complete skeletons of Arsinoitherium fossils were recovered, arsinoitheriids have been found in southeastern Europe, including Crivadiatherium from Romania, and Hypsamasia and Palaeoamasia from Turkey.

== Description ==
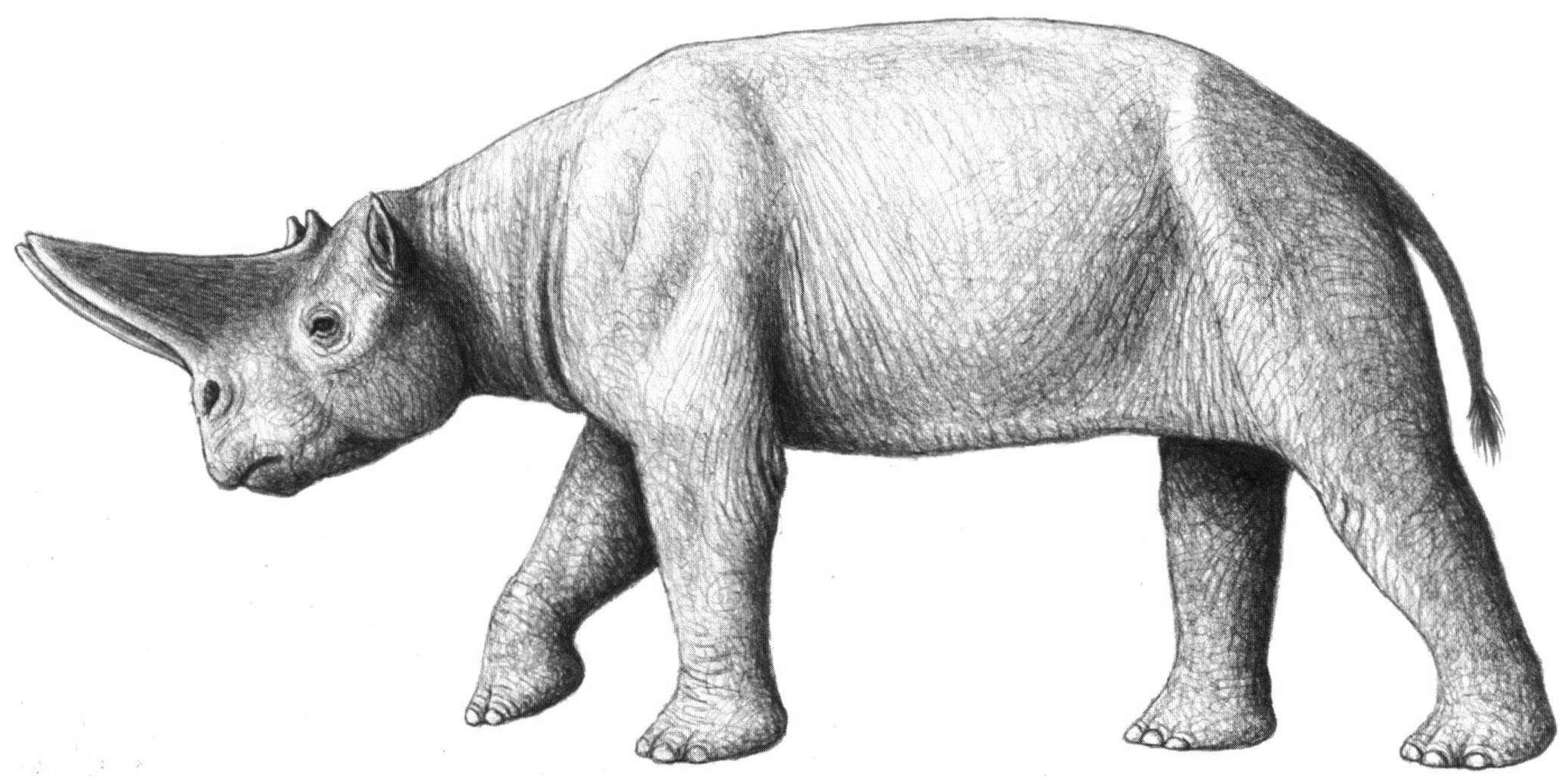
Reconstruction of Arsinoitherium by Mauricio Antón

Arsinoitherium was a heavily built animal, with robust limbs and anatomical adaptations similar to elephants to support their body weight, a condition known as graviportality. The most noticeable feature of the skull of Arsinoitherium are two large horns atop its skull, structurally similar to those of bovids (cattle, goats, and their relatives). A second pair of smaller knob-like protuberances sat behind these horns.

=== Skull ===
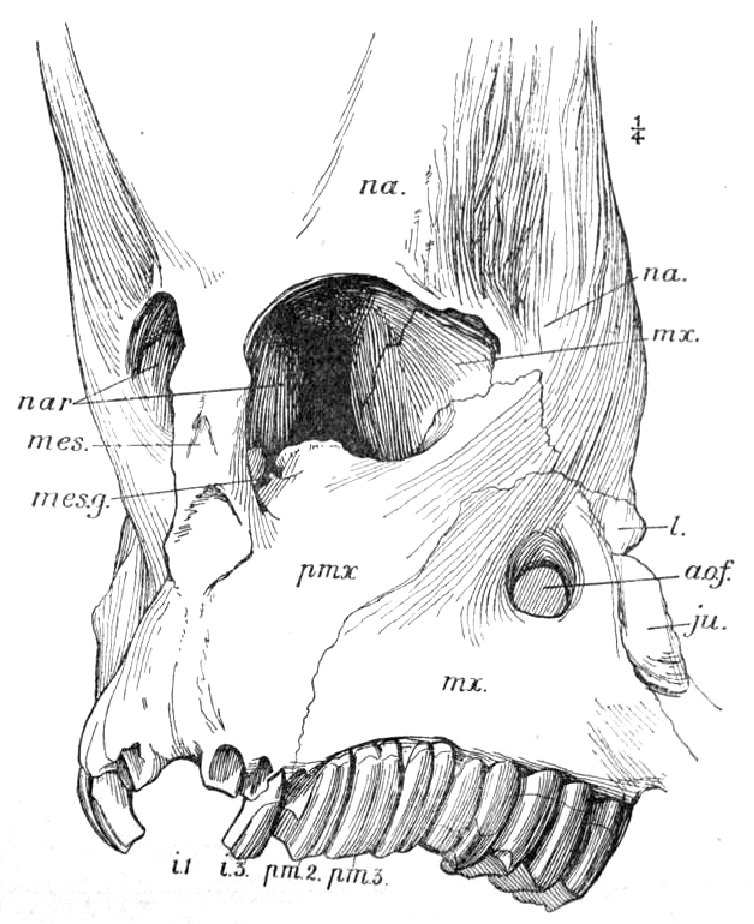
View of the skull from the front, showing the narial openings and prenasal bar

A proboscis or tapir-like lip has been suggested for Arsinoitherium due to the more posterior (rearward) position (retraction) of the narial openings and the morphology of the incisive foramen. The lambdoidal crest is prominent, and the basiocciput forms a straight ventral border against the foramen magnum. The parietal bone is fused to the supraoccipital and is bounded by the lambdoidal crest. The squamosal bone is enlarged and forms most of the lateral wall of the cranium. In the orbit, on the lacrimal bone, there is a small protuberance which connects with the maxilla. The premaxilla of Arsinoitherium is comparatively small, while the maxilla is enlarged and possesses a large jugal process which links to the lacrimal.

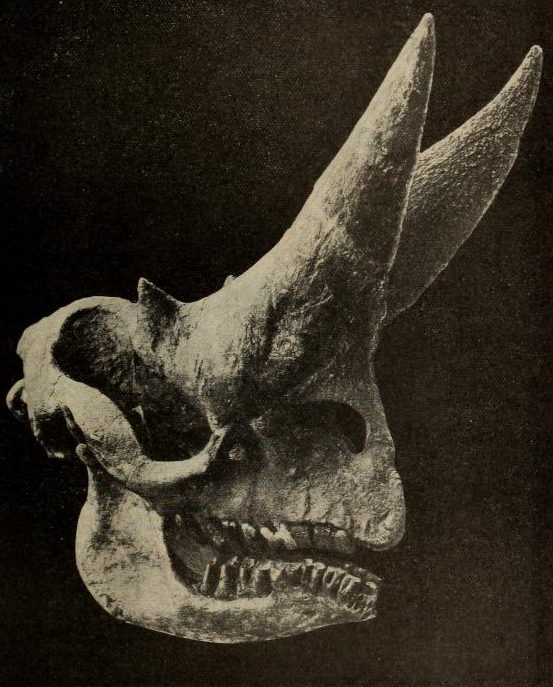
The horns of Arsinoitherium were likely extended in life by keratin.

The characteristic horns of Arsinoitherium are derived from the fronto-nasal region of the skull, the frontal bone bearing the entirety of the small horns and a portion of the base of the larger horns, while the nasal possesses the majority of the larger horn's base. A form of sexual dimorphism has been suggested, with some specimens having smaller, more erect horns and other having larger, nearly triangular shaped horns. The narial aperture is bifurcated by a prominent vertical prenasal bar. The bar is not present in subadults and is thought to be developed at a later point in life, and is speculated to be an ossification of a cartilaginous nasal septum. The skull is generally narrow and elongated, and the occipital plane is anteriorly slanted. The occipital condyle projects posteriorly and the zygomatic arches are steeply angled on the posterior dorsal side. On the inside, the horns of Arsinoitherium are hollowed out and connect to the frontal sinus system, while on the outside they are covered in vascular striations, which suggest a keratinous growth sheathed the horns in life.

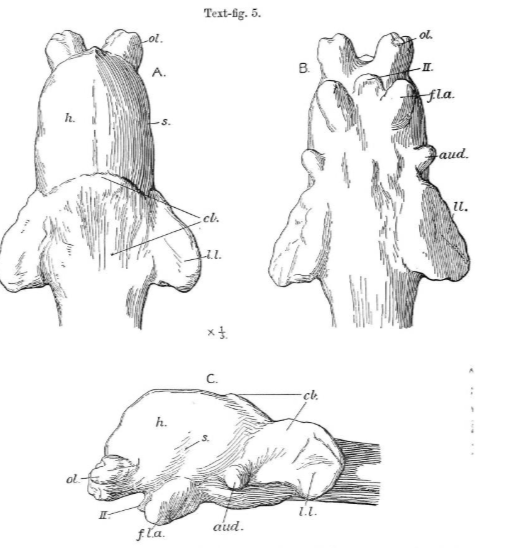
Endocast of A. zitteli

The dentary is elongated and shallow, yet still massively built, with the ramus and coronoid process being elevated. The masseteric fossae are expansive. Below the third premolar, there is a single mandibular foramen.

==== Endocast ====
Endocasts of Arsinoitherium's brain have been made. In most regards it is similar to that of other large mammals. The olfactory bulbs are smaller than those of the Dinocerata and Pantodonta, though the cerebra are larger comparatively.

==== Dentition ====
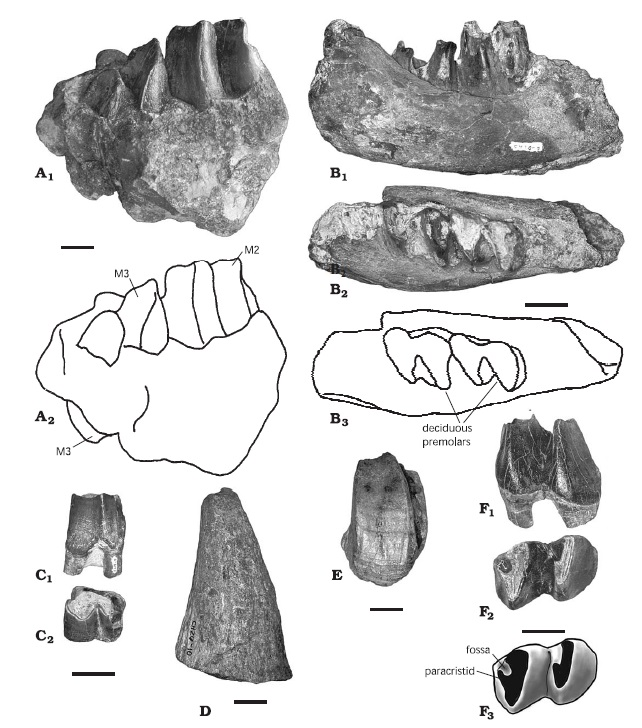
Teeth of A. giganteum

The teeth of Arsinoitherium are unique in morphology. The teeth are incredibly high crowned or hypsodont, with the molars composed of 2 high transverse columns, and said molars are repeatedly folded, being bilophodont, similar to the teeth of tapirs and elephants. The canines and incisors are similar in shape and most likely not used for any combat purposes. The crowns of both are also high, and the outer face of the crown is highly convex. The premolars are strikingly different from the molars, as they exhibit little to no folding. The dental formula of Arsinoitherium is 3.1.4.33.1.4.3, though some older sources claim 1.0.4.31.0.4.3. The teeth of A. giganteum are larger than those of A. zitteli, but are morphologically similar.

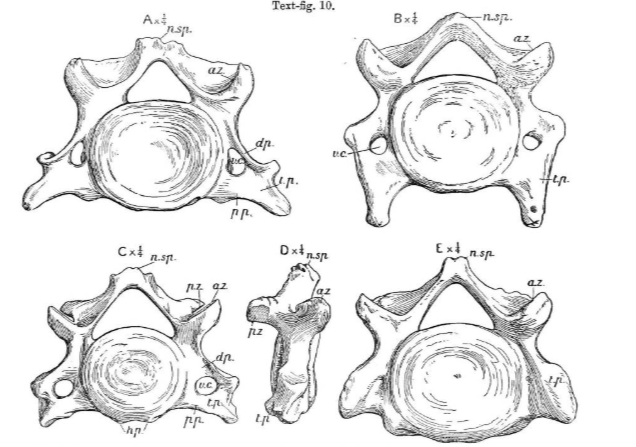
Cervical vertebrae of A.zitteli

=== Vertebral column ===
The vertebrae of Arsinoitherium are incredibly robustly built, with a wide neural arch. The atlas of Arsinoitherium is wider than those found in the Dinocerata, bearing a longer transverse process and a less convex neural arch. The axis has a rounded odontoid process, and the odontoid has deep grooves on each side which separate it from the main articulation points of the axis. The cervical vertebrae have a shortened centrum in relation to the height and width, with the morphology compared to those of elephants. Because of this, the width of movement of the neck has been assumed to be restricted to lateral movements. The neural spines of the thoracic vertebrae are angled backwards.

=== Appendicular skeleton ===
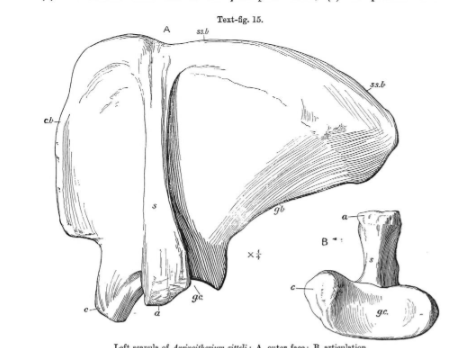
Scapula of A. zitteli

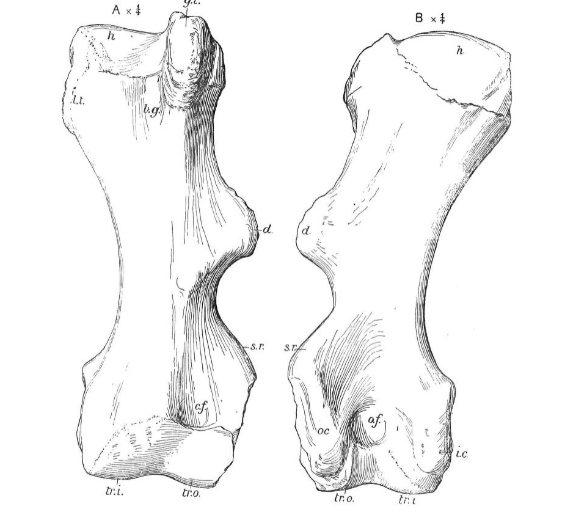
Humerus of A. zitteli

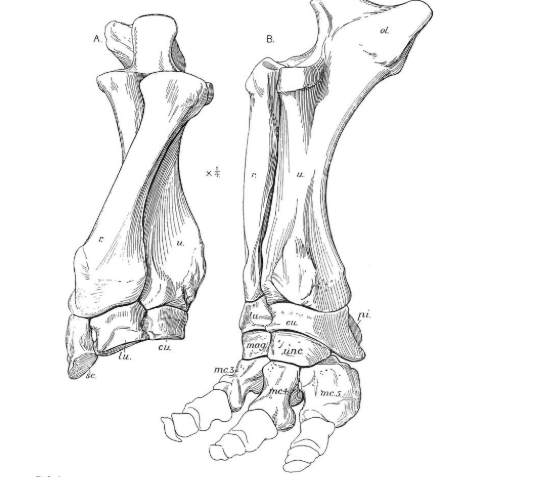
Forelimb bones of A. zitteli

==== Pectoral girdle and forelimbs ====
The upper portion of the border between the scapula and the coracoid is slightly convex, and likewise the suprascapular border is separated by a shallow concavity originating from the scapular spine. The spine itself, which is thick and rugose, rises gradually in height from the superior border, ending 3 cm (1.2 in) above the glenoid cavity. The inner face of the scapula is concave, and the scapula generally differs from those of other large bodied mammals in terms of structure.

Similarly to other megafaunal mammals, Arsinoitherium has a graviportal limb structure. The limbs are pillar-like, with the humerus, the radius and the ulna all being robust. The shaft and distal end of the humerus is compressed, and the head is enlarged. There is a large ridge formed from the greater tuberosity, but it is not as developed as in Uintatherium or Elephas. The bones of the forelimb are not coossified, and the ulna is far more robust than the radius. They are morphologically similar to those of Elephas. The radius is short, with the outside of the posterior face possessing an elongated facet which articulates with the ulna, with the texture indicating the two bones were tightly linked. The olecranon process of the ulna is incredibly large, and the bone is generally much thicker than the radius. The shaft of the bone is triangular in shape when viewed in section. The feet are pentadactyl and plantigrade, with the astragalar morphology of Arsinoitherium resembling that of elephants. There are differences, however, and a reconstruction of the forefeet suggests that Arsinoitherium held its forefeet in a more laterally oriented and plantigrade position than extant elephants.

==== Pelvic girdle and hindlimbs ====
The ilia of the pelvis are flared, with the inner surface being slightly concave. The shape of the acetabulum is oval, and the pit for the round ligament is remarkably deep. On the pubis, the anterior border is also concave. The hindlimbs are similar to the forelimbs. The femur is compressed much like the humerus, as is the tibia. The fibula is elongated and slender, with flared articular ends.

=== Size ===
Adult Arsinoitherium zitteli stood around 1.75 m (5.7 ft) tall at the shoulders and 3 m (9.8 ft) in length. A. giganteum was larger than A. zitteli, with proportionally longer limbs. Mass estimates for A. zitteli range from 510–1,500 kg (1,120–3,310 lb) while A. giganteum is estimated have been be around 1,760–1,960 kg (3,880–4,320 lb).

== Palaeobiology ==
=== Diet ===
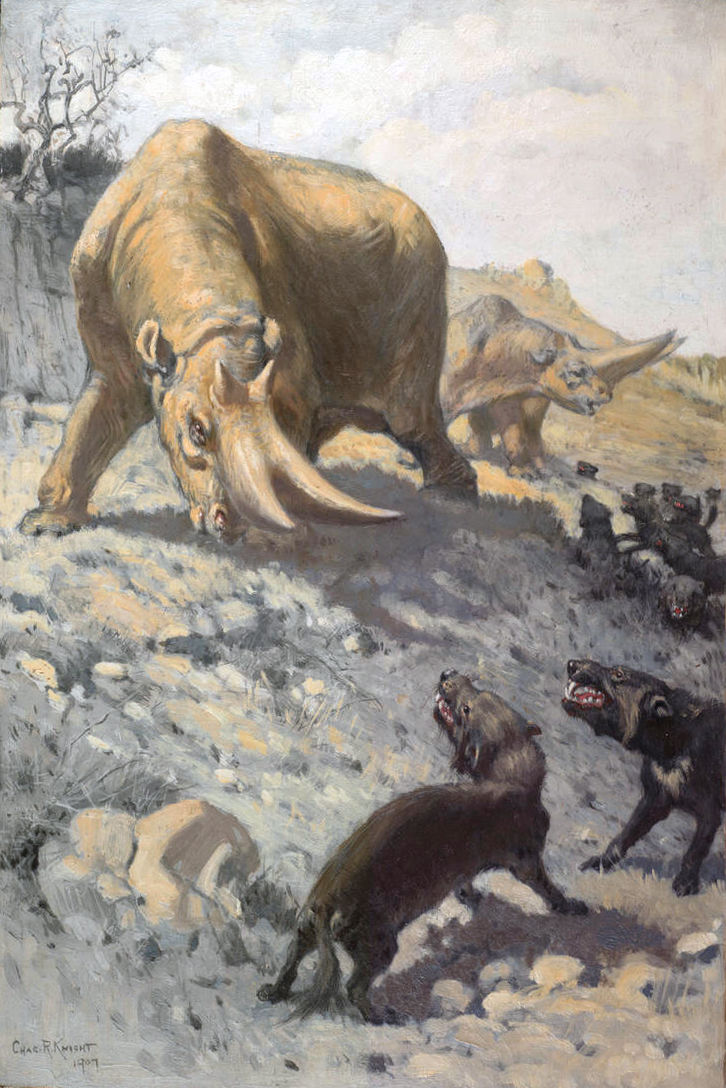
Arsinoitherium and apterodontine hyaenodonts are known to have coexisted (art by Charles R. Knight, note that the hyaenodont depicted is Pterodon, which did not coexist with Arsinoitherium)

Arsinoitherium was likely a browser, indicated by the morphology of the incisor teeth. The environments Arsinoitherium inhabited were wet, humid forests, being fluvial and shallow marine deposits. These localities have an array of both terrestrial as well as aquatic and even marine fauna, and some authors have posited that Arsinoitherium may have had semi-aquatic habits due to the morphology of the forelimbs. This has been disputed, however, as analysis of stable isotopes reveals the genus was most likely primarily terrestrial.

=== Communication ===
Arsinoitherium, like modern elephants, had the ability to communicate via foot drumming and loud, low frequency vocalisations. Its cochlear canal lacked a secondary bony lamina, an indicator of an adaptation for hearing low frequency sounds.

== Palaeoenvironment ==
In Dor-El-Talha, a fossil locality in Libya, the genus is known to have lived alongside many species, including members of the suborder Hyracoidea, apterodontine hyaenodonts, the proboscideans Palaeomastodon, Barytherium and Moeritherium as well as the giant snake Gigantophis. Fish are also known, with silurid catfish, gar, sawfish and lungfish being common. Crocodilians are also known from the locality.

Fossils of Arsinoitherium have been found in:

Eocene

- Aydim Formation, Oman
- Idam Unit Formation, Libya
- Djebel Chambi, Tunisia

Oligocene

- Malembe, Angola
- Jebel Qatrani Formation, Egypt
- Chilga Formation, Ethiopia
- Erageleit Formation, Kenya
- Ashawq Formation, Oman
- Shumaysi Formation, Saudi Arabia
