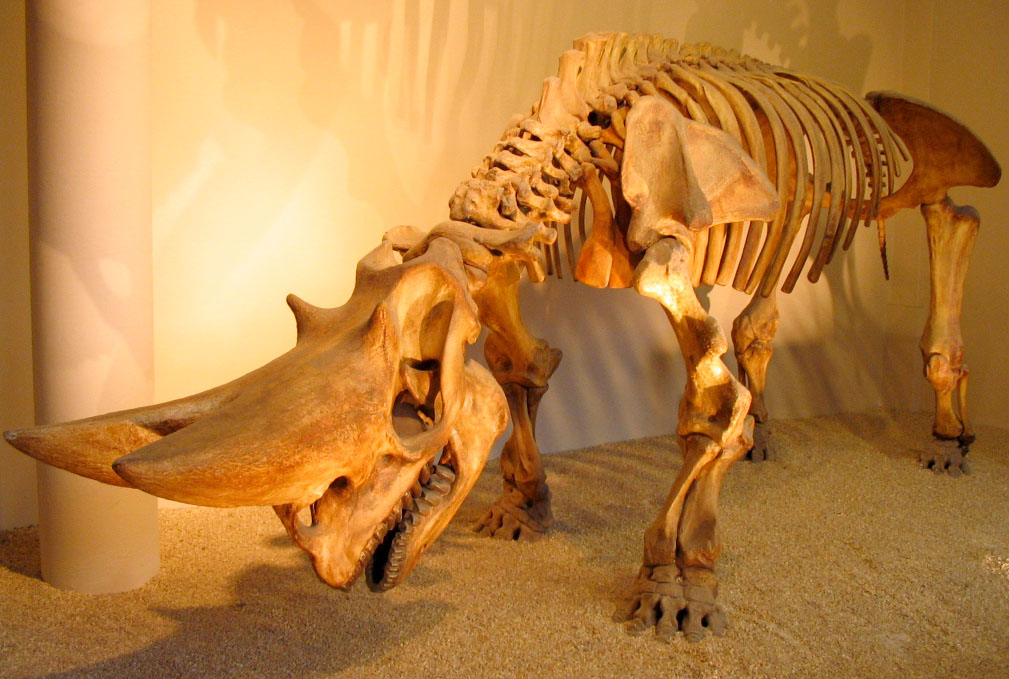
- Skeleton of Arsinoitherium zitteli

Scientific classification
- Kingdom: Animalia
- Phylum: Chordata
- Class: Mammalia
- Infraclass: Placentalia
- Order: †Embrithopoda
- Family: †Arsinoitheriidae; Andrews, 1904

Genera
- †Arsinoitherium; †Namatherium

= Arsinoitheriidae =

Arsinoitheriidae Temporal range: Late Eocene–Early Oligocene

Extinct family of mammals

Arsinoitheriidae is a family of mammals belonging to the extinct order Embrithopoda. Remains have been found in the Middle East, Africa, Asia and Romania. Arsinotheriids were closely related to hyraxes, elephants, sirenians, and possibly desmostylians (as part of the superorder Afrotheria). The name of the clade honors Queen Arsinoe II of Egypt, as the first fossils of Arsinoitherium were found near the ruins of her palace.

== Description ==
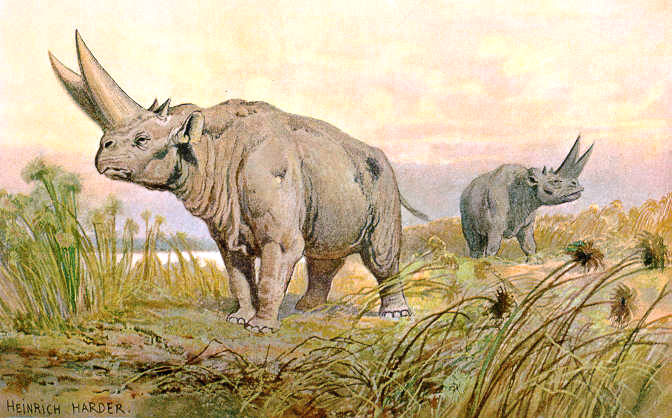
Reconstruction of an undetermined Arsinoitherium species

Arsinoitheriids are easily recognized by their prominent nose horns, which, in life, were likely covered in keratin. The horns are derived from the nasal bones. They are also characterized by pseudolophodont molars. They also had small incisors, which may have asked as some form of tusk.

== Fossil record ==
Based on the less derived traits of Namatherium, it is assumed that Arsinoitheriidae underwent a divergent evolution sometime during the Lutetian. The latest living genus, Arsinoitherium, was first recovered from the Latest Eocene of the Fayum; it disappears from the fossil record altogether before the end of the Early Oligocene.
