= Palaeoamasia =

Palaeoamasia Temporal range: Ypresian 55–48 Ma (possible Paleocene record)

Scientific classification
- Domain: Eukaryota
- Kingdom: Animalia
- Phylum: Chordata
- Class: Mammalia
- Order: †Embrithopoda
- Family: †Palaeoamasiidae
- Genus: †Palaeoamasia; Ozansoy, 1966
- Species: †P. kansui

Binomial name
- †Palaeoamasia kansui Ozansoy, 1966

Extinct family of mammals

Palaeoamasia is an extinct herbivorous paenungulate mammal of the embrithopod order, making it distantly related to elephants, sirenians, and hyraxes. Palaeoamasia fossils have been found in Turkish deposits of the Çeltek Formation, dating to the Ypresian. It has unique bilophodont upper molars, an embrithopod synapomorphy.

== Discovery ==
Palaeoamasia kansui (Ozansoy, 1966), the type species, was first discovered in Anatolia, Turkey in 1966. Since then, Palaeoamasia fossils have only been found In Anatolia. The fossil record of Palaeoamasia is scarce, although a new species of Palaeoamasia was discovered in 2014. The Palaeoamasia sp. nov. fossil is the youngest found to date, extending the period of survival of the genus to the early Oligocene. The fossils recorded consist mostly of tooth and jaw fragments. The tooth fossils show that Palaeoamasia has two prominent transverse crests on upper molars, signifying the embrithopod synapomorphy of bilophodont upper molars.

== Distribution ==
Embrithopods are a group of early Cenozoic mammals with evolutionary roots in Northern Africa, eventually traveling over the Neotethys Sea to the Eurasian Eocene island of Pontides. The method in which embrithopods reached the Orhaniye Basin is unclear. One thing is certain, in that vicariance is out of the question. The Orhaniye Basin is located on what was an Eocene island called Pontides. Pontides was located just north of the Neotethys sea and south of the Paratethys Sea. Pontides, which is part of Eurasia, separated into its own land mass before the Paleocene-Eocene boundary. Embrithopods did not appear on Pontides until 43 Ma, which is after the breakup of the island. Part of the reason the embrithopods living in the Orhaniye Basin are thought to have been living on an island is the odd nature of the associated mammalian fauna, which includes anachronistic taxa such as pleuraspidotheriid condylarths, but lacks the (otherwise ubiquitous) rodents, perissodactyls, and artiodactyls. If vicariance did take place, all fossils would be found in both locations. This leaves only two other methods of dispersal. Embrithopods could have “island hopped” from Africa to Pontides. Another theory is that embrithopods rode a land raft that happened upon Pontides. Currently, only Palaeoamasia and Hypsamasia, both Palaeoamasiidae, have been found in Turkey.

A recent stable isotope study concluded that Arsinoitherium, an African embrithopod, was terrestrial, not semi-aquatic as originally believed. Radiating from the same ancestral node, it is likely that Palaeoamasia was also terrestrial. Thus, it is likely that embrithopods did not swim across the Neotethys sea.

== Description ==
Little information is available on the physiology of Palaeoamasia. Sister taxa Arsinoitherium, on the other hand, is very well documented. The build of Arsinoitherium is consistent with aquatic mammals, even though it is a terrestrial mammal. The vertebrate of Arsinoitherium suggest that the head was raised above the shoulders, allowing the mammal to hold its head above water while swimming. However, the sacral vertebrae were no fused, making it harder to hold up its large body. Additionally, Arsinoitherium has short legs with a low knee joint, reducing the mammal to a short stride, which tends to make it more difficult to walk. Finally, Arsinoitherium is recorded to be plantigrade.

Palaeoamasia has highly unique hyperdilambdodont molars, indicative of a plant-only diet. This derived feature of having two prominent transverse crests on upper molars is only found in embrithopods.
