= Shungura Formation =

Stratigraphic formation in the Omo River basin in Ethiopia

- Stratigraphic range: Piacenzian-Gelasian; ~3.6–1.0 Ma
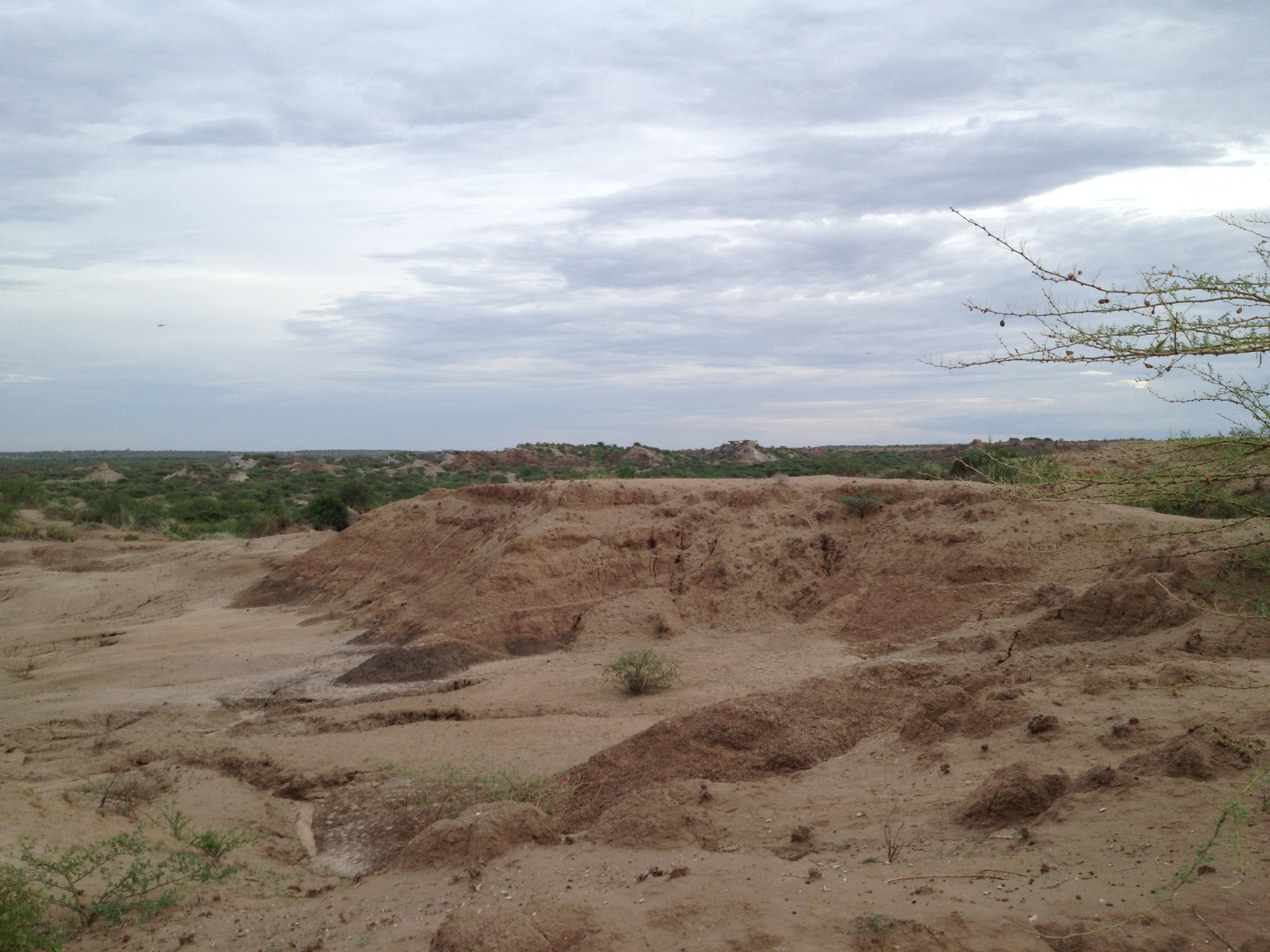
- Lower Omo Valley
- Type: Geological formation
- Unit of: Omo Group
- Underlies: Kalam Formation
- Overlies: Mursi Formation

Lithology
- Primary: Sandstone, siltstone
- Other: Claystone, tuff

Location
- Coordinates: 5.1°N 36.0°E
- Approximate paleocoordinates: 5.8°N 36.1°E
- Region: South Ethiopia Regional State
- Country: Ethiopia
- Extent: Omo Subbasin; Turkana Basin
- Shungura Formation (Ethiopia)

The Shungura Formation is a stratigraphic formation located in the Omo river basin in Ethiopia. It dates to the Late Pliocene to Early Pleistocene. Oldowan tools have been found in the formation, suggesting early use of stone tools by hominins. Among many others fossil contain mammals, birds and reptiles are found in this formation.

== Geology ==
The formation comprises sandstones, siltstones, claystones and tuff, deposited in a fluvial to deltaic lacustrine environment.

== Paleobiota ==
=== Fossil content ===
Color key: Taxon / Reclassified taxon / Taxon falsely reported as present / Dubious taxon or junior synonym / Ichnotaxon / Ootaxon / Morphotaxon

Notes
Uncertain or tentative taxa are in small text
~~crossed out~~ taxa are discredited. Among many others, the following fossils have been reported from the formation:

=== Birds ===
Birds of the Shungura Formation
Taxa	Species	Locality	Material	Notes	Images
Ardea	A. howardae	Member G	The upper half of a left coracoid (F504-27).	A heron	
Leptoptilos	L. falconeri	Member C8 and G	A distal tibiotarsus, OMO−122−76−367, and pedal phalanx, F−516−23	A giant marabou stork	

=== Mammals ===
==== Afrotheres ====
===== Hyracoidea =====
Hyraxes of the Shungura Formation
Taxa	Species	Locality	Material	Notes	Images
Gigantohyrax	G. maguirei	Member B.		A giant hyrax.	

===== Proboscideans =====
Proboscideans of the Shungura Formation
Taxa	Species	Locality	Material	Notes	Images
Loxodonta	L. adaurora	Member O		Extinct species of African elephants.	
Loxodonta	L. exoptata	Member O		Extinct species of African elephants.	
Palaeoloxodon	P. recki shungurensis	Member A, B, C, D, and E.		An extinct elephant species native to Africa.	Life restoration of Palaeoloxodon recki

==== Artiodactyls ====
===== Bovids =====
Bovids of the Shungura Formation
Taxa	Species	Locality	Material	Notes	Images
Aepyceros	A. shungurae	Members B, C, D, E, F, and G		Extinct relative of modern impala.	
Antidorcas	A. recki	Members B, C, D, E, F, G, and H.		Extinct relative of modern springbok	
Beatragus	B. antiquus	Member G.		Extinct relative of modern Hirola.	
Gazella	G. praethomsoni	Members F, G, and H.		An early relative of gazelle.	
Kobus	K. ancystrocera	Members B, C, E, G, and J.		Relatives of Reduncini	
Kobus	K. ellipsiprymnus	Members G, J, and K.		Relatives of Reduncini	
Kobus	K. oricornis			Relatives of Reduncini	
Kobus	K. sigmoidalis	Members D, E, F, and G.		Relatives of Reduncini	
Megalotragus	M. sp.			An alcelaphine.	
Menelikia	M. lyrocera	Members C, E, F, G, H, I, and J.		An extinct reduncinae artiodactyl.	
Pelorovis	P. sp.				
Parmularius	P. altidens	Members G and H.		An extinct relative of alcelaphine.	
Redunca	R. sp.			A reedbuck.	
Syncerus	S. cf. acoelotus	Members B, C, D, E, F, and G.		A cape buffalo.	
Syncerus	S. ekosowan	Members B (B-9 or B-10) and G (G-5)	Complete cranium (OMO 50-10001) with both horn cores and dentition.	A cape buffalo.	
Tragelaphus	T. gaudryi	Member F.		Relative of spiral horned anterlope.	
Tragelaphus	T. nakuae	Member F.		Relative of spiral horned anterlope.	

===== Camelids =====
Camels of the Shungura Formation
Taxa	Species	Locality	Material	Notes	Images
Camelus	C. grattardi	Lower member G (G4-G13).	Distal humerus L1–68–76, maxilla fragment with heavily worn P4–M2 (Omo 75S-70–956); same individual as Omo 75–69–2222, M3.	Extinct relative of Camels.	
Camelus	C. sp.				

===== Giraffidae =====
Giraffids of the Shungura Formation
Taxa	Species	Locality	Material	Notes	Images
Giraffa	G. gracilis	Members D, E, F, and G.		Extinct relative of modern giraffe.	
Giraffa	G. pygmaea	Members G.		Extinct relative of modern giraffe.	
Giraffa	G. jumae			Extinct relative of modern giraffe.	
Sivatherium	S. maurusium	Member F.		An extinct giraffid.	

===== Hippopotamidae =====
Hippopotamids of the Shungura Formation
Taxa	Species	Locality	Material	Notes	Images
Hexaprotodon	H. protoamphibius			An extinct hippopotamid relative.	
Hexaprotodon	H. shungurensis	Member C	A partial skull (calvarium and mandible)	An extinct hippopotamid relative.	

===== Suidae =====
Suidae of the Shungura Formation
Taxa	Species	Locality	Material	Notes	Images
Kolpochoerus	K. limnetes	Members E, D, G, F, and H.		An omnivorous pig.	
Metridiochoerus	M. jacksoni	Members E, F, and G.		A giant warthog.	
Metridiochoerus	M. modestus	Members G		A giant warthog.	
Notochoerus	N. euilus	Members A, C.		A tetraconodontinae suid.	
Notochoerus	N. scotti	Members B, C, and H		A tetraconodontinae suid.	
Nyanzachoerus	N. kanamensis	Members A, B		A tetraconodontinae suid.	
Nyanzachoerus	N. jaegeri	Member A		A tetraconodontinae suid.	

==== Carnivora ====
Carnivorans of the Shungura Formation
Taxa	Species	Locality	Material	Notes	Images
Enhydriodon	E. omoensis	Member C.	Right femur (L 183–14), fragmented mandible, and lower dentition.	A giant otter about the size of a lion, the largest relative discovered in 2022.	Enhydriodon omoensis right femur faced at different sides.
Dinofelis	D. petteri	Member A, B, C, D, E, F, and G.	Damaged cranium and dentition fragments, OMO 1–768–3.	A sabertooth cat.	
Dinofelis	D. sp.	Member A, B, C, D, E, F, and G.	Postcranial skulls (OMO 28-67-1075 from Member B), craniodental, and dentition fragments.	A sabertooth cat.	
Helogale	H. hirtula			Extinct species of Mongoose family.	
Helogale	H. kitafe			Extinct species of Mongoose family.	
Homotherium	H. aethiopicum	Members C and G.			

==== Chiroptera ====
Bats of the Shungura Formation
Taxa	Species	Locality	Material	Notes	Images
Hipposideros	H. kaumbului	Member F.		A Roundleaf bat.	
Taphozous	T. abitus	Member F.		Extinct relative of tomb bats and sheath-tailed bats.	

==== Eulipotyphla ====
Eulipotyphlas of the Shungura Formation
Taxa	Species	Locality	Material	Notes	Images
Crocidura	C. aithiops				
Suncus	S. haesaertsi			Relatives of Shrews	
Suncus	S. cf. lixus			Relatives of Shrews	
Suncus	S. shungurensis			Relatives of Shrews	

==== Lagomorphs ====
Lagomorphs of the Shungura Formation
Taxa	Species	Locality	Material	Notes	Images
Lepus	L. capensis	Member E, and lower Members F and G.			

==== Perissodactyls ====
Chalicotheres

Chalicotheres of the Shungura Formation
Taxa	Species	Locality	Material	Notes	Images
Ancylotherium	A. hennigi	Members D and G.	Several tooth fragments and postcranial skeleton	A chalicothere.	

Rhinocerotidae

Rhinocerotidaes of the Shungura Formation
Taxa	Species	Locality	Material	Notes	Images
Ceratotherium	C. simum	Member A, B, C, D, E, J, K, L, and O.	Multiple dentition, cranium, and postcranial skeletion.	A white rhinoceros.	
Diceros	D. bicornis	Member A, B, D, L, K, and O.	Complete Skull and Molars.	A black rhinoceros.	

Equidae

Equids of the Shungura Formation
Taxa	Species	Locality	Material	Notes	Images
Equus	E. oldowayensis	Members F, G, H, I, and J.	Jawbone mandible with complete dentition.	An Olduvai zebra.	
Eurygnathohippus	E. libycum	Members C, E, F, G, and L.		A Hipparionine horse.	
Hipparion	H. sitifense	Members A, B, C, D, E, F, and G	Multiple cheek teeth and fragmented dentition.	Relatives of early horses.	

==== Primates ====
===== Cercopithecidae =====
Cercopithecids of the Shungura Formation
Taxa	Species	Locality	Material	Notes	Images
Dinopithecus	D. sp.				
Paracolobus	P. mutiwa	Member C, E, and G.	A skull, humerus and femur bone.	An early Colobinae monkey.	
Rhinocolobus	R. turkanaensis	Member C, E, and G.	A skull humerus and femur bone.	An early Colobinae monkey.	
Theropithecus	T. brumpti	Members B, C, D, E, F, and G.	A skull	Extinct relative of Gelada Baboons.	
Theropithecus	T. oswaldi	Members D, E, F, G, H, I, J, K, and L.	A skull	Extinct relative of Gelada Baboons.	

===== Galagidae =====
Galagids of the Shungura Formation
Taxa	Species	Locality	Material	Notes	Images
Otolemur	O. howelli	Member B.	L. 1-378 (right m2), L. 1-377 (holotype, left maxillary fragment) with P4-M1, and Omo 229-73-4018 (right mandibular fragment).	Extinct relative of greater galago.	

===== Hominins =====
Homonids of the Shungura Formation
Taxa	Species	Locality	Material	Notes	Images
Australopithecus	A. sp.				
Paranthropus	P. aethiopicus	Members C, D, E, and F.			
Paranthropus	P. boisei	Members G and K.			

==== Rodents ====
Rodents of the Shungura Formation
Taxa	Species	Locality	Material	Notes	Images
Aethomys	A. deheinzelini			a rock mouse.	
Arvicanthis	A. sp.				
Acomys	A. sp.				
Gerbillus	G. sp.				
Heterocephalus	H. atikoi				
Jaculus	J. orientalis				
Mastomys	M. minor				
Paraxerus	P. ochraceus				
Pelomys	P. sp.				
Saidomys	S. sp.				
Tatera	T. sp.				
Xerus	X. sp.				

=== Reptiles ===
Reptiles of the Shungura Formation
Taxa	Species	Locality	Material	Notes	Images
Euthecodon	E. brumpti	Member H.	Complete partial skull.	A giant African long-snouted crocodile, formally named Tomistoma brumpti.	
Pelusios	P. rudolphi		A partial plastron and carapace of Pelusios rudolphi	An African mud turtle	

=== Fish ===
Fish of the Shungura Formation
Taxa	Species	Locality	Material	Notes	Images
Auchenoglanis	A. sp.	Members F3 and G24.	Omo 199 1973-1278 and Omo 215 1973–2556, two pectoral spines, the former lacking the distalmost tip.		
Clarias	C. sp.				
Gymnarchus	G. sp.				
Polypterus	P. bichir	Upper Member A.	An association of several rows of rhombic ganoid scales, Omo 40–4343.	A Nile Bichir.	
Sindacharax	S. greenwoodi			Relatives of African tetras.	
Sindacharax	S. omoensis	Upper Member A.	Omo 128–72–22, Partial premaxilla (right) broken off lateral to the third outer tooth and second inner tooth, with first and second inner teeth in situ, and tooth bases visible of the first, second, and third outer teeth.	Relatives of African tetras.	
Synodontis	S. frontosus			relatives of Mochokid catfishes	
Synodontis	S. schall			relatives of Mochokid catfishes	

== See also ==
- List of fossil sites
- List of fossiliferous stratigraphic units in Ethiopia
- Geology of Ethiopia
