= Abdullahi H. Ali =

Kenyan conservation biologist

- Born: Abdullahi Hussein Ali; Garissa, Kenya
- Education: University of Nairobi (BSc 2005, MSc 2010); University of Wyoming (PhD 2016)
- Known for: Community-based conservation focused on the recovery of the critically endangered hirola and the reticulated giraffe in eastern Kenya; founding the Hirola Conservation Program, the Somali Giraffe Project and the Horn of Africa Wildlife Program
- Awards: Hornaday Award (2013); Disney Conservation Hero (2014); Whitley Award (2020); National Geographic/Buffett Award for Leadership in Conservation (2021); IFAW Animal Action Lifetime Achievement Award (2025); Whitley Award continuation funding (2025)
- Scientific career
- Fields: Wildlife ecology, Conservation biology
- Workplaces: Hirola Conservation Program; Somali Giraffe Project; Kenya Wildlife Service (honorary warden)

Abdullahi Hussein Ali is a Kenyan conservation biologist known for his work on the conservation of the hirola, the world's most endangered antelope, and for community-based conservation among Somali pastoralists in northeastern Kenya. He founded the Hirola Conservation Program in 2014 and the Somali Giraffe Project in 2017. His work focuses on the hirola, a critically endangered antelope found along the border between Kenya and Somalia whose wild population numbered about 500 in 2022, and on reticulated giraffes in northeastern Kenya and neighbouring Somalia, and extends to other threatened wildlife of the Horn of Africa, including cheetahs, African wild dogs and Grévy's zebras. National Geographic has described him as "the world's foremost expert on the hirola".

His research identified the spread of trees into former grasslands, rather than predation, as the main barrier to the hirola's recovery, and the Hirola Conservation Program has since placed more than 10,000 acres (4,000 ha) of land under restoration and employs more than 40 community rangers. He has also led the organisation's wildlife-focused response to climate extremes in the region, such as emergency water, feed and veterinary programmes during the 2020–2023 drought. His awards include a Whitley Award in 2020, a National Geographic/Buffett Award for Leadership in Conservation in 2021, and a Lifetime Achievement Award at the International Fund for Animal Welfare's Animal Action Awards in 2025.

== Early life and education ==
Ali was born in northeastern Kenya to nomadic parents and grew up in Garissa, a town on the eastern bank of the Tana River that lies north of the historical range of the hirola. He has said that sharing the landscape with the hirola inspired his career in conservation. He was among the first pupils at Sankuri Primary School, about 20 kilometres (12 mi) northwest of Garissa, which was established by the former army general Mahamoud Mohamed, and later attended Thika High School. His schooling marked his move from a pastoralist upbringing towards a career in conservation.

He earned a bachelor's degree in wildlife biology in 2005 and a master's degree in conservation biology in 2010, both from the University of Nairobi. He completed a PhD in ecology at the University of Wyoming in 2016, where his dissertation examined the relative roles of habitat degradation and predation in driving hirola declines, and was later named the university's Outstanding Dissertation of the Year.

== Career ==
In 2005, after completing his undergraduate degree, Ali was invited by the late Samuel Andanje of the Kenya Wildlife Service to join Kenya's Hirola Management Committee as a member; the committee leads national efforts to save the hirola. As a local scientist, he has helped communities set up conservancies in the Ijara and Fafi sub-counties, where local rangers track radio-collared hirola, and campaigned to re-establish the defunct 500 square kilometres (190 sq mi) Arawale National Reserve. He went on to found the Hirola Conservation Program in 2014 and the Somali Giraffe Project in 2017.

The Kenya Wildlife Service has appointed Ali an honorary warden for its Eastern Conservation Area, where he also leads wildlife rescue and rehabilitation work. He is president of the Kenya chapter of the Society for Conservation Biology, a member of the IUCN SSC Antelope Specialist Group and of the IUCN SSC Giraffe and Okapi Specialist Group. He also sits on Kenya's National Giraffe Conservation Task Force and is a National Geographic Explorer and a fellow of the Zoological Society of London's EDGE of Existence programme. He has worked with the UK-based People's Trust for Endangered Species on hirola conservation since at least 2015.

== Hirola Conservation Program ==
Ali founded the Hirola Conservation Program (HCP) in 2014. The organisation is led by local, largely Somali staff and works on community land in Garissa County, where most of the remaining hirola live, with an emphasis on education and on involving Somali herders in conservation. Its programmes include habitat restoration, community monitoring, anti-poaching, wildlife rescue and rehabilitation, disease surveillance under a One Health approach, and emergency response to drought and floods.

=== Landscape-level habitat restoration ===
Because Ali's research identified the spread of trees into former grasslands as a major cause of the hirola's decline, much of HCP's work focuses on habitat restoration. In 2015 the programme began testing restoration methods on experimental plots, removing trees and planting native grass seed. It hires local people to thin trees and plant grasses, and buys back grass seed that community members harvest. By 2025 HCP employed more than 40 community rangers and had placed more than 10,000 acres (4,000 ha) of land under restoration; according to the Wildlife Conservation Network and HCP, it had reseeded more than 1,000 hectares with native grasses, manually cleared 2,000 hectares of invasive trees, including Prosopis juliflora and Acacia reficiens, and established 30 native "grass islands" across Fafi and Ijara. It is also carrying out a ten-year grassland restoration project in the Arawale National Reserve with the Garissa County Government. In February 2021 the Society for Ecological Restoration featured HCP's hirola rangeland-restoration work as the featured project of its Restoration Resource Center, with an account written by Ali. Wood from cleared invasive trees is turned into charcoal and briquettes, giving local people an income from restoration.

=== Hirola breeding and reintroduction ===
In 2012 the Ishaqbini Community Conservancy, the Northern Rangelands Trust and the Kenya Wildlife Service established a predator-proof, livestock-free sanctuary of about 27 square kilometres (10 sq mi) within the conservancy, into which 48 wild hirola were translocated to breed a source population for future reintroductions. Ali, then a doctoral student, monitored the translocated herds and worked with local communities on the capture and release. The sanctuary population had grown to about 120 animals by 2025. HCP runs a Hirola Breeding and Re-wilding Program there with the Kenya Wildlife Service, monitoring births, survival and health, and plans the gradual release of selected animals into the wider Ishaqbini conservancy, with founders chosen to maintain genetic diversity and release sites assessed for forage and low competition with livestock.

Ali's research has informed these plans. A 2018 study he led used large-scale experiments inside and outside the sanctuary to guide strategies for reintroducing hirola. A 2026 study comparing sanctuary-bred and wild hirola found that, although sanctuary animals stayed as vigilant as wild ones, they fled simulated lion roars about five times more slowly; the authors recommended releasing animals into areas with few predators and monitoring their survival after release.

=== Community-based conservation and coexistence ===
The hirola shares its range with the livestock of Somali pastoralists, and competition for grass and water, and the risk of livestock diseases spreading to wildlife, are central to the species' conservation. HCP's approach treats herders as partners rather than as a threat. Ali founded "Herders for Hirola", a network of Somali pastoralists trained in wildlife ecology who report hirola sightings outside formal protected areas and raise awareness among their neighbours. The programme co-develops rotational grazing plans with pastoralists, so that grazing and hirola conservation can coexist on the same land, and more than 250 community members, including women and young people, have taken part in reseeding and clearing invasive trees. It also promotes alternative livelihoods such as tour-guide training and nature-based enterprises, and plans to work with the private sector to develop ecotourism in the region.

HCP runs anti-poaching patrols, including protection for elephants that returned to the area in 2011, and trains local scouts and community members to monitor hirola, including in the Ishaqbini Hirola Conservancy. Its Hirola Wildlife Education Centre, near Garissa, runs school visits, guided nature walks and lessons on the hirola, the Somali giraffe and local ecosystems; it had reached more than 1,500 students by 2024 and hosted about 2,000 schoolchildren in 2025.

=== Ranger-led response to climate extremes ===
The Horn of Africa has experienced more frequent and severe droughts over the past two decades, and Ali has argued that wildlife needs to be part of the response to them. For example, the severe drought that affected the region from 2020 to 2023 killed about 30 hirola, roughly six percent of the remaining population. After the Kenyan government declared the drought a national disaster in September 2021, HCP warned that most water pans in Garissa County had dried up and that pastoralists moving herds into core wildlife areas increased the risks of poaching and of diseases such as trypanosomiasis spreading from livestock to hirola.

Through its "Water for Wildlife" programme, HCP has trucked water to villages, ranger camps and conservancies since 2021, reaching more than 5,000 households and five conservancies, and has built and refilled water pans and troughs in wildlife areas to keep animals away from settlements. In 2022 alone it delivered more than five million litres of water, rehabilitated 16 water troughs and built 11 new ones. It set up feeding points for hirola, Somali giraffes, beisa oryx and Grévy's zebras with hay, pellets and acacia pods. With funding from the People's Trust for Endangered Species, it had also built or repaired 27 water pans and opened 58 wildlife corridors to water along the Tana River by early 2023. These corridors, known locally as malkas, had been blocked by invasive Prosopis juliflora, farms and settlements, forcing giraffes and other animals across farmland.

Because livestock diseases can also affect hirola, HCP vaccinates livestock in partnership with the Garissa County veterinary department; by early 2023 it had vaccinated more than 61,000 camels, cattle, sheep and goats to reduce the risk of disease spreading to wildlife, and took part in a joint anti-poaching operation with police that led to nine arrests. Its rescue programme took in animals displaced by the drought, including six cheetah cubs and three gerenuk calves. From 2021 it partnered with Humane Society International on drought response and disaster preparedness for animals in the county. In 2021 Ali established the Hirola Wildlife Crisis Fund to provide emergency support along the Kenya–Somalia border during droughts, floods, disease outbreaks, surges in the cross-border bushmeat trade and poaching. HCP continued emergency water deliveries, livestock vaccination and supplementary feeding during dry spells in 2024 and 2025.

=== Other Horn of Africa wildlife ===
Although the hirola is its focus, HCP's work also covers other threatened species of the Kenya–Somalia borderlands. It surveys communities on cheetah presence, conflict with livestock and wildlife trafficking, and monitors African wild dogs. Ali co-authored a 2025 study of pastoralists' attitudes towards cheetahs across the Horn of Africa, which found that most respondents accepted the killing of cheetahs that attack livestock. HCP's conservancies also protect Grévy's zebras, and Ali has reported a new population of the species along the Kenya–Somalia border, beyond its previously known range.

== Somali Giraffe Project ==
Ali founded the Somali Giraffe Project (SGP) in 2017. It is a cross-border, community-based programme run under HCP that works with Indigenous communities in Garissa and Wajir counties in Kenya and across the border in Somalia. Aerial surveys of these frontier counties and neighbouring Mandera during Kenya's first national wildlife census in 2021 counted about 6,000 reticulated giraffes, more than a third of the species' remaining population, but drought, poaching and habitat loss have pushed giraffes into towns and farms. Ali has described the species' decline as a "silent extinction".

In June 2017 a herder working with HCP reported a rare leucistic "white" giraffe and her calf near the Ishaqbini Hirola Conservancy. HCP staff filmed the pair in what Ali described as the first known video footage of white giraffes, and the sighting received international media coverage and drew attention to the region's giraffes. In March 2020 a white female and her calf were killed by poachers, which Ali described as "devastating news".

The project trains local rangers, runs anti-poaching patrols and removes wire snares, and provides veterinary treatment for sick giraffes in partnership with the Kenya Wildlife Service's veterinary unit. It studies giraffe movements, feeding, water use and the overlap between giraffe range and grazing land, and through its "Geri Tracker" initiative had fitted 29 reticulated giraffes with satellite tracking tags by 2025, with a further 20 collared in 2025–2026.

=== Lime farming and coexistence with farmers ===
Along the Tana River, drought drives giraffes onto irrigated farms, where they eat and damage mango trees, a conflict that research he co-authored has linked to the blocking of traditional water corridors. As a solution, the project encourages farmers to grow limes, which giraffes find unpalatable, instead of mangoes. It has distributed 2,000 free lime seedlings to farmers and connected them with buyers in Nairobi, securing a market for 12 tonnes of limes. A 2025 study by Somali Giraffe Project researchers of 101 farms in Garissa County between 2022 and 2024 found that mango farms suffered up to 20 giraffe raids, compared with typically none to three on lime farms, and that conflict fell as the area planted with limes increased. Lime farms also earned higher median monthly incomes than mango farms, particularly when farmers sold to companies rather than through middlemen. It also provides farmers with deterrents such as motion-activated solar lights and beehives (more than 200 farms had received them), promotes the planting of acacia trees and works with schools. In 2023 the project received a grant from the Mohamed bin Zayed Species Conservation Fund.

== Research ==
Ali's ecological research examines the causes of the hirola's decline. In early 2013, working with the Zoological Society of London, his team fitted GPS collars to nine hirola from seven herds in northeastern Kenya to track their movements. A 2017 study he led, published in the Journal of Applied Ecology, found that tree cover in the hirola's range had increased by 251% between 1985 and 2012, and that hirola tracked with GPS collars between 2012 and 2015 avoided wooded areas throughout the year. The authors linked the spread of trees to the loss of elephants to poaching, changes in livestock grazing, and drier conditions, and concluded that habitat loss, rather than predation, was the main reason the species had failed to recover. Ali has argued that restoring grasslands is a more practical way to recover the species than controlling predators.

His more recent research has focused on the hirola's reintroduction, diet and anti-predator behaviour, on choosing native grass species for restoration, and on conflict between people and giraffes in Garissa County. A 2026 study he led in the Journal of Mammalogy compared the anti-predator behaviour of sanctuary-bred and wild hirola to inform reintroductions, and another examined local attitudes, perceived risks and pathways to coexistence with giraffes. Studies he co-authored the same year found that the blocking of water corridors along the Tana River by farms and invasive plants drives conflict between farmers and giraffes, and identified the socio-economic factors that shape local support for giraffe conservation. He has also contributed data to continental and global studies, including a 2018 study in Science on reduced movement of mammals in human-modified landscapes and the 2024 bii4africa dataset of biodiversity intactness across Africa's major land uses.

=== Selected publications ===
As lead author

- Ali, Abdullahi H.; Helman, Annabella R.; Goheen, Jacob R. (2026). "Proactive and reactive anti-predator responses of exclosure-bred versus wild hirola (Beatragus hunteri): implications for reintroductions and population recovery". Journal of Mammalogy gyag071. doi:10.1093/jmammal/gyag071.
- Ali, Abdullahi H.; Sangale, Edwin L.; Ali, Mohamed H.; Ford, Adam T.; Sponarski, Carly C. (2026). "Human–giraffe conflict in eastern Kenya: local interactions, attitudes, perceived risks, and pathways to coexistence". Frontiers in Conservation Science. 7 1699294. Bibcode:2026FrCS....799294A. doi:10.3389/fcosc.2026.1699294.
- Ali, Abdullahi H.; Muriuki, George M. (2026). "Restoring the last grasslands: rangeland recovery as the lifeline for hirola conservation". Gnusletter. 43: 15–19.
- Ali, Abdullahi H.; Kivai, Stanislaus (2026). "Drivers of hirola antelope diet selection in natural and managed habitat in eastern Kenya". Ecology and Evolution. 16 (1) e72980. Bibcode:2026EcoEv..1672980A. doi:10.1002/ece3.72980. PMC 12828064. PMID 41583879.
- Ali, Abdullahi H.; Muriuki, George M. (2025). "Ecological niche modeling for determining grass species suitable for hirola range-wide restoration and reintroduction in eastern Kenya". Restoration Ecology. 34 (2) e70284. doi:10.1111/rec.70284.
- Ali, Abdullahi H.; Amin, Rajan; Evans, Jeffrey S.; Fischer, M.; Ford, Adam T.; Kibara, Amos; Goheen, Jacob R. (2018). "Evaluating support for rangeland-restoration practices by rural Somalis: an unlikely win-win for local livelihoods and hirola antelope?". Animal Conservation.
- Ali, Abdullahi H.; Kauffman, Matthew J.; Amin, Rajan; Kibara, Amos; King, Juliet; Mallon, David; Musyoki, Charles; Goheen, Jacob R. (2018). "Demographic drivers of a refugee species: large-scale experiments guide strategies for reintroductions of hirola". Ecological Applications. 28 (2): 275–283. Bibcode:2018EcoAp..28..275A. doi:10.1002/eap.1664. PMID 29222956.
- Ali, Abdullahi H.; Ford, Adam T.; Evans, Jeffrey S.; Mallon, David P.; Hayes, Matthew M.; King, Juliet; Amin, Rajan; Goheen, Jacob R. (2017). "Resource selection and landscape change reveal mechanisms suppressing population recovery for the world's most endangered antelope". Journal of Applied Ecology. 54 (6): 1720–1729. Bibcode:2017JApEc..54.1720A. doi:10.1111/1365-2664.12856.
- Ali, Abdullahi H. (2016). Range collapse, demography and conservation of the critically endangered hirola antelope in Kenya (PhD thesis). University of Wyoming.
- Ali, Abdullahi H.; Goheen, Jacob R.; Amin, Rajan; Lekolol, I. (2014). "Lessons from the capture and collaring of the critically endangered hirola antelope (Beatragus hunteri), Ijara, Kenya". Gnusletter. 31: 8–13.

As co-author
Garissa County, hirola, giraffe and Horn of Africa research

- Ali, Mohamed H.; Muriuki, George; Ali, Abdullahi H.; Gitari, Harun (2026). "Encroachment on water corridors drives farmers–giraffe conflicts along River Tana ecosystem in eastern Kenya". Ecology and Evolution. 16 (8) e74067. Bibcode:2026EcoEv..1674067A. doi:10.1002/ece3.74067. PMC 13433143. PMID 42553114.
- Ali, Mohamed H.; Ali, Abdullahi H.; Gitari, Harun (2026). "Human–giraffe coexistence: socio-economic factors influencing giraffe conservation in eastern Kenya". Human Dimensions of Wildlife. 31 (6): 734–749. doi:10.1080/10871209.2026.2659102.
- Jones, K. W.; Evangelista, P. H.; Durant, S. M.; et al. (2025). "Attitudes, norms, and beliefs of pastoralists toward cheetahs in the Horn of Africa". Frontiers in Conservation Science. 6 1630140. Bibcode:2025FrCS....630140J. doi:10.3389/fcosc.2025.1630140.
- Ali, M. H.; Ali, Abdullahi H.; Nungula, E. Z.; Gitari, H. (2023). "Effect of extreme drought on reticulated giraffe population in northeastern Kenya". International Journal of Bioresource Science. 10 (2): 173–183. doi:10.30954/2347-9655.02.2023.4.
- Jowers, Michael J.; Queirós, João; Resende Pinto, Rui; Ali, Abdullahi H.; et al. (2020). "Genetic diversity in natural range remnants of the critically endangered hirola antelope". Zoological Journal of the Linnean Society. 190: 384–395. doi:10.1093/zoolinnean/zlz174.
- Ng'weno, Caroline C.; Maiyo, Nelly J.; Ali, Abdullahi H.; Kibungei, Alfred K.; Goheen, Jacob R. (2017). "Lions influence the decline and habitat shift of hartebeest in a semiarid savanna". Journal of Mammalogy. 98 (4): 1078–1087. doi:10.1093/jmammal/gyx040.
- Amin, Rajan; Andanje, S. A.; Ogwonka, B.; Ali, Abdullahi H.; et al. (2015). "The northern coastal forests of Kenya are nationally and globally important for the conservation of Aders' duiker Cephalophus adersi and other antelope species". Biodiversity and Conservation. 24 (3): 641–658. Bibcode:2015BiCon..24..641A. doi:10.1007/s10531-014-0842-z.

As co-author
continental and global studies

- Clements, Hayley S.; et al. (2024). "The bii4africa dataset of faunal and floral population intactness estimates across Africa's major land uses". Scientific Data. 11 (1) 191. Bibcode:2024NatSD..11..191C. doi:10.1038/s41597-023-02832-6. PMC 10861571. PMID 38346970.
- Broekman, Maarten J. E.; et al. (2022). "Evaluating expert-based habitat suitability information of terrestrial mammals with GPS-tracking data". Global Ecology and Biogeography. 31 (8): 1526–1541. Bibcode:2022GloEB..31.1526B. doi:10.1111/geb.13523. PMC 9544534. PMID 36247232.
- Ford, Adam T.; Ali, Abdullahi H.; Colla, Sheila R.; Cooke, Steven J.; Lamb, Clayton T.; Pittman, Jeremy; Shiffman, David S.; Singh, Navinder J. (2021). "Understanding and avoiding misplaced efforts in conservation". FACETS. 6 (1): 252–271. Bibcode:2021Facet...6..252F. doi:10.1139/facets-2020-0058.
- Noonan, Michael J.; et al. (2019). "A comprehensive analysis of autocorrelation and bias in home range estimation". Ecological Monographs. 89 (2) e01344. Bibcode:2019EcoM...89E1344N. doi:10.1002/ecm.1344.
- Tucker, Marlee A.; et al. (2018). "Moving in the Anthropocene: Global reductions in terrestrial mammalian movements" (PDF). Science. 359 (6374): 466–469. Bibcode:2018Sci...359..466T. doi:10.1126/science.aam9712. PMID 29371471.

== Awards and honours ==
- 2013 – William T. Hornaday Award, American Society of Mammalogists, for a student's contribution to mammal conservation
- 2014 – Conservation Hero, Disney Worldwide Conservation Fund
- 2016 – Outstanding Dissertation of the Year, University of Wyoming
- 2020 – Whitley Award from the Whitley Fund for Nature, with £40,000 in project funding, for a landscape-level approach to conserving the hirola
- 2021 – National Geographic/Buffett Award for Leadership in Conservation
- 2025 – Lifetime Achievement Award, Animal Action Awards, International Fund for Animal Welfare, presented at BAFTA in London
- 2025 – Whitley Award continuation funding, Whitley Fund for Nature
