= Fafsula =

- Location within Kenya
- Coordinates: 1.15°S 40.02°E
- Country: Kenya
- County: Garissa County
- Time zone: UTC+3 (EAT)

Fafsula is a settlement in Garissa County, Kenya, just north of Arawale National Reserve.
