= Dueadera =

- Location within Kenya
- Coordinates: 1.12°S 40.1°E
- Country: Kenya
- County: Garissa County
- Time zone: UTC+3 (EAT)

Dueadera is a settlement in Garissa County, Kenya, just north of Arawale National Reserve.
