= Ishaqbini Hirola Conservancy =

Kenyan community-based conservation area

The Ishaqbini Hirola Conservancy is a community-based conservation area located in Garissa County, Kenya. The conservancy covers approximately 72 km^{2} (28 sq mi). It is located along the eastern bank of the Tana River, and borders the former Tana River Primate Reserve (1976−2007).

Despite its small size, the conservancy is a core refuge and breeding ground for the endemic and critically endangered Hirola antelope. Together with the Arawale National Reserve, the conservancy forms a key part of the Hirola's habitat.

== History ==
The Hirola population, endemic to north-eastern Kenya, has been at the centre of the formation of the conservancy. In 1963, fears for the species’ survival prompted the defunct National Park Organization and the Game Department to attempt a precautionary translocation of about 50 Hirola to the Tsavo East National Park. Although well-intentioned, the translocation was strongly opposed by local communities.

The escalating conflict in Somalia in the 1990s and continuous decrease in population numbers of the Hirola, led to a second translocation by the Kenyan Wildlife Service in 1996. A fresh opposition to the plan resulted in the formation of a number of community-based conservation groups, one of them successfully filing a case in the Kenyan High Court against any future translocation. Nevertheless, the translocations had resulted in an isolated and viable ex situ population of perhaps 120 Hirola antelopes in Tsavo East National Park.

In 2005, with the aim to conserve the Hirola as part of their natural and cultural heritage, four local communities (Kotile, Korisa, Hara and Abaratilo), supported by the Northern Rangelands Trust, developed and put forward a proposal to the government of Kenya to establish the Ishaqbini Hirola Conservancy.

== Birds ==
The number of bird species in the conservancy is estimated at 350. 60% of the total number of bird families recorded in Kenya are present in the conservancy. 13 species are listed on East Africa's regional Red Data List, including the hooded vulture and Clarke's weaver. Other, more common species inhabiting the conservancy are the saddle-billed stork, eastern violet-backed sunbird, the white-throated bee-eater and the crested francolin.

The conservancy is unique in that it has significant numbers of species of the East Africa Coast and the Somali-Masai biomes, species that qualify an area as an important bird area.

== Resources ==
- Andaje, S. A. (2002) Factors limiting the Abundance and Distribution of Hirola in Tsavo and Tana River Districts. Kenyan Wildlife Service: Biodiversity Conservation Unit.
- Antipa, R. S, Ali, M. H. and Hussein, A. A. (2007) Assessment of the Potential of Eco/Cultural Tourism as Viable Enterprises in Southern Garissa, Ijara and Lamu Districts: A Community Conservation and Enterprise Support Initiative. National Environmental Management Authority of Kenya.
- Muchai. M. et al. (2007) Birds of Ishaqbini Community Conservancy in Ijara District. National Museums of Kenya.
- Muchai, M. et al. (2007) The Distribution, Abundance and Habitat Use of large and medium sized mammals in Ishaqbini Community Wildlife Conservancy, Kenya. National Museums of Kenya.
- Muchai, M. et al. (2007) The Distribution, Abundance and Habitat Use of the Hunter's Hartebeest (Hirola); Beatragus hunteri; Sclater, 1889 in Ishaqibini Community Wildlife Conservancy and Arawale National Reserve, Kenya. National Museums of Kenya.

Specific
