= Tetraconodon =

Tetraconodon Temporal range: 15.97–5.332 Ma

Scientific classification
- Kingdom: Animalia
- Phylum: Chordata
- Class: Mammalia
- Order: Artiodactyla
- Family: Suidae
- Subfamily: †Tetraconodontinae
- Genus: †Tetraconodon; Falconer, 1868

Type species
- †Tetraconodon magnum Falconer, 1868

Species
- T. intermedius (van der Made, 1999); T. magnum; T. malensis (Htike et al., 2005); T. minor (Pilgrim, 1926)

Extinct genus of mammals

Tetraconodon was an extinct genus of even-toed ungulates that existed during the middle and late Miocene in Asia (India, Pakistan, Thailand, Myanmar).

== Description ==
The last two pairs of premolars of Tetraconodon were extremely large, while the first two premolars were small, a unique characteristic of tetraconodontinae not found in other suids.

Tetraconodon magnum was largest species, while T. malensis is the smallest. Originally known from only the oversized premolars, T. magnum was once believed to have reached sizes comparable to that of a hippopotamus or rhinoceros. Once more material was recovered, such size estimates were invalidated, but it was nonetheless a large suid.
