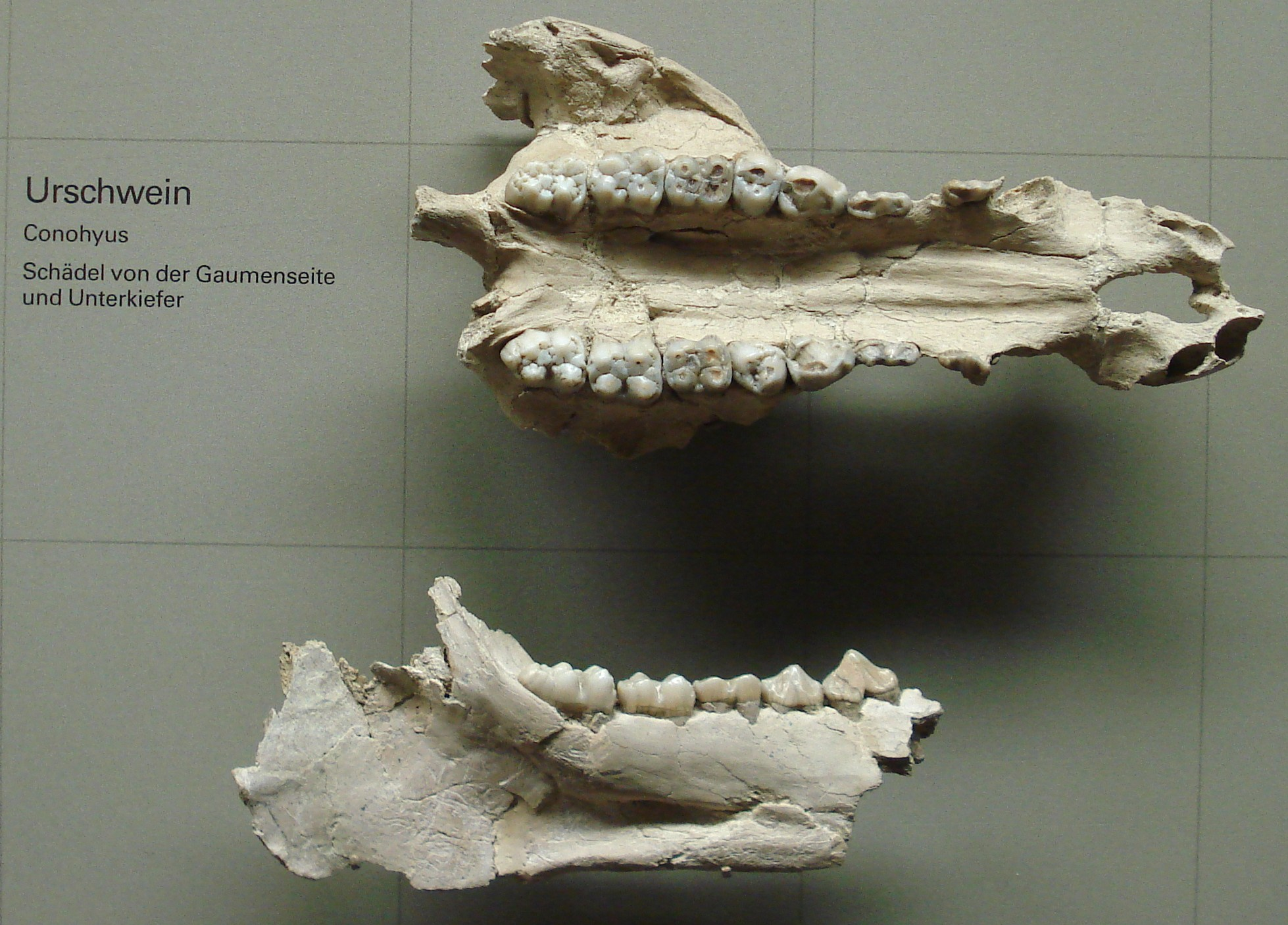
- A Conohyus mandible

Scientific classification
- Kingdom: Animalia
- Phylum: Chordata
- Class: Mammalia
- Order: Artiodactyla
- Family: Suidae
- Subfamily: †Tetraconodontinae
- Genus: †Conohyus; Pilgrim, 1926

Species
- C. doati (Lartet, 1851); C. simorrensis (Lartet, 1851) (type)

= Conohyus =

Conohyus Temporal range: 13.65–9.7 Ma

Extinct genus of mammals

Conohyus was an extinct genus of suid that existed during the Miocene in Europe and in Asia.

== Taxonomy ==
Conohyus sindiensis was reassigned to the genus Retroporcus by Pickford and Laurent (2014).
