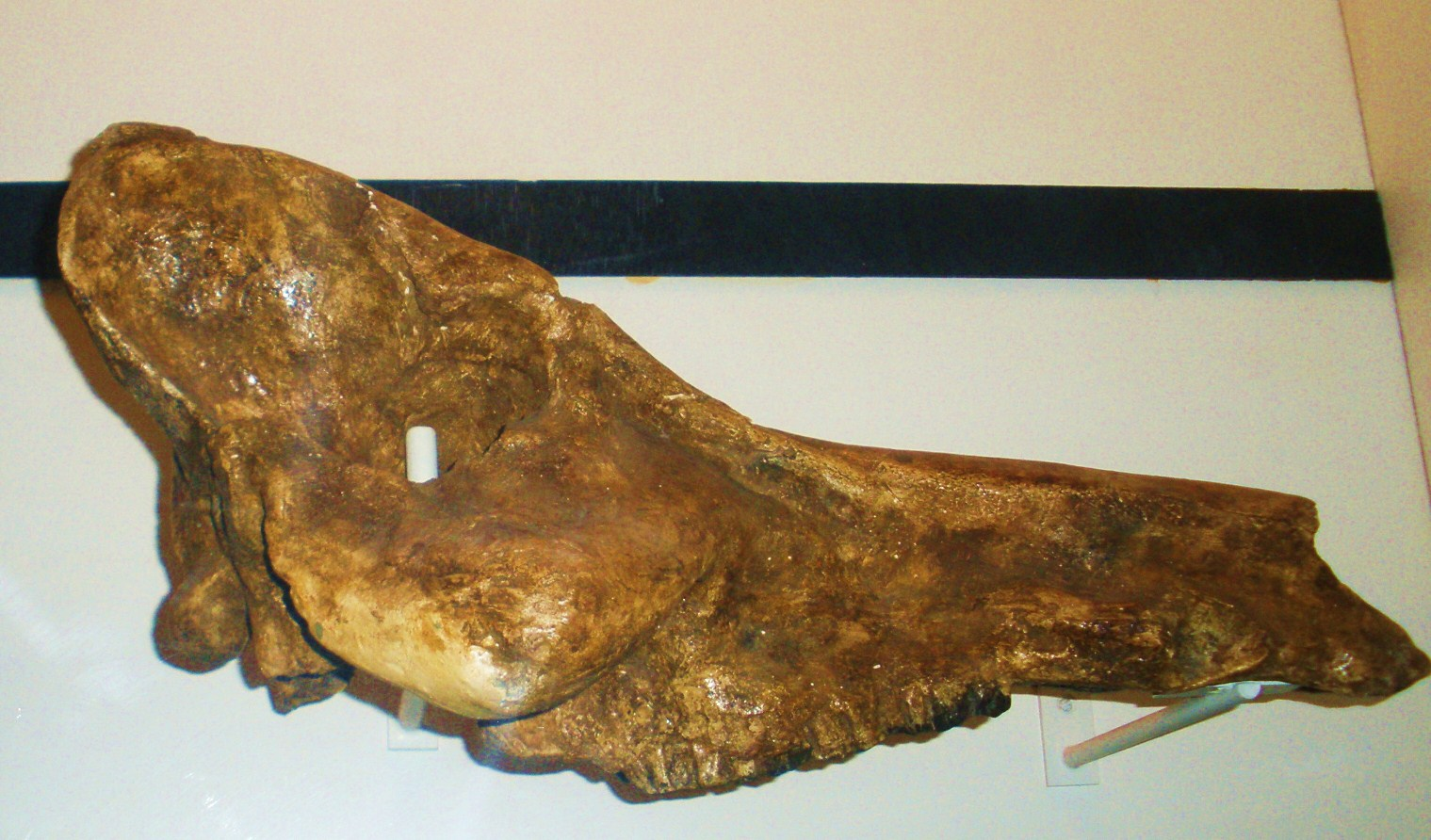
- Kolpochoerus limnetes skull

Scientific classification
- Kingdom: Animalia
- Phylum: Chordata
- Class: Mammalia
- Order: Artiodactyla
- Family: Suidae
- Genus: †Kolpochoerus van Hoepen and van Hoepen, 1932

Type species
- †Kolpochoerus heseloni Leakey, 1943

Species
- See text

= Kolpochoerus =

Kolpochoerus Temporal range: Zanclean to Pleistocene 5.3–.0126 Ma

Extinct genus of mammals

Kolpochoerus is an extinct genus of the pig family Suidae related to the modern-day genera Hylochoerus, Phacochoerus, and Potamochoerus. It is believed that most of them inhabited African forests, as opposed to the bushpig and red river hog that inhabit open brush and savannas. There are currently eleven recognized species.

== Species ==
In taxonomic order:

- Genus †Kolpochoerus
  - K. deheinzelini — Chad, Ethiopia (Early Pliocene)
  - K. afarensis - eastern Africa (Pliocene)
  - K. limnetes- eastern Africa (Plio-Pleistocene)
  - K. millensis — Central Afar, Ethiopia (Pliocene)
  - K. cookei - Ethiopia (Late Pliocene)
  - K. heseloni - eastern Africa (Plio-Pleistocene)
  - K. olduvaiensis - eastern Africa (Pleistocene)
  - K. majus - eastern Africa (Pleistocene)
  - K. phacochoeroides - Morocco (Late Pliocene)
  - K. paiceae - South Africa (Pleistocene)
  - K. phillipi - Ethiopia (Pleistocene)

== Palaeoecology ==
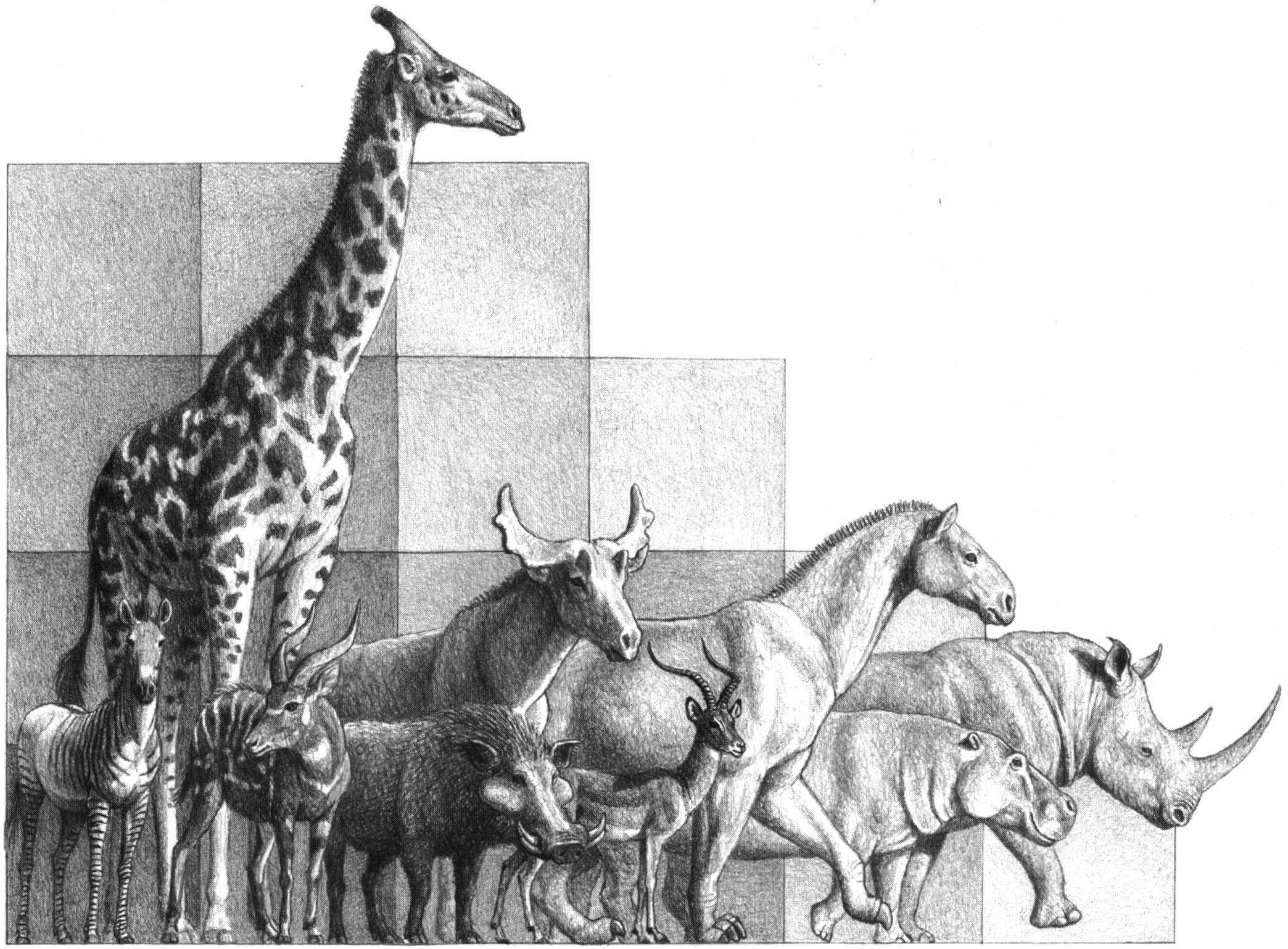
Ungulates from the Pliocene of eastern Africa, including K. limentes

Based on dental microwear texture analysis (DMTA) of its fossils from Kanapoi and Hadar, K. afarensis had a broad, unspecialised diet that included foods that were hard and brittle as well as underground foods such as roots and tubers. DMTA of Kolpochoerus fossils from the Shungura Formation suggests that the genus had a preference for young, minimally abrasive grasses.
