= Parachleuastochoerus =

Parachleuastochoerus Temporal range: 11.1–9.7 Ma

Scientific classification
- Kingdom: Animalia
- Phylum: Chordata
- Class: Mammalia
- Infraclass: Placentalia
- Order: Artiodactyla
- Family: Suidae
- Genus: †Parachleuastochoerus; Golpe-Posse, 1972

Species
- †P. huenermanni; †P. sinensis; †P. steinheimensis; †P. crusafonti

Extinct genus of mammals

Parachleuastochoerus was an extinct genus of swine that existed during the Miocene in Europe. It was a smaller descendant of the Conohyus genus, with narrower cheek teeth and reduced premolars.

== Palaeoecology ==
P. steinheimensis fed on roots, as indicated by ^{87}Sr/^{86}Sr, δ^{18}O_{CO3}, and δ^{13}C values sourced from its dental enamel.
