= Tetraconodontinae =

Tetraconodontinae Temporal range: Miocene - pliocene

Scientific classification
- Domain: Eukaryota
- Kingdom: Animalia
- Phylum: Chordata
- Class: Mammalia
- Order: Artiodactyla
- Family: Suidae
- Subfamily: †Tetraconodontinae

Genera
- Conohyus; Notochoerus; Nyanzachoerus; Parachleuastochoerus; Retroporcus; Sivachoerus; Tetraconodon; Versoporcus

Extinct subfamily of mammals

Tetraconodontinae is an extinct subfamily of the pig family (Suidae). Fossils have been found in Africa and Asia.
