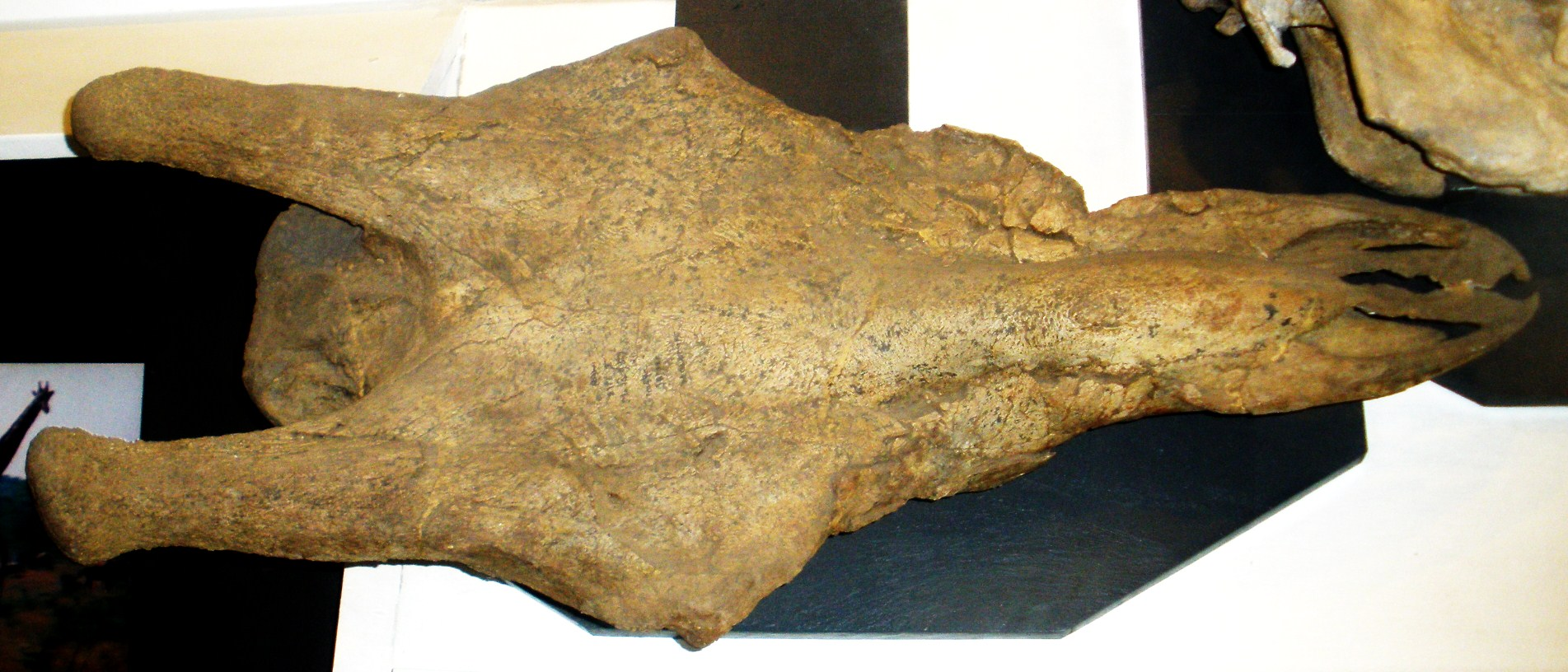
- Skull

Scientific classification
- Kingdom: Animalia
- Phylum: Chordata
- Class: Mammalia
- Order: Artiodactyla
- Family: Giraffidae
- Genus: Giraffa
- Species: †G. jumae

Binomial name
- †Giraffa jumae Leakey, 1967

= Giraffa jumae =

Giraffa jumae Temporal range: 5.3–0.126 Ma Pliocene to Pleistocene

Extinct species of mammal

Giraffa jumae is an extinct species of even-toed ungulate in the Giraffidae family. The species ranged from Malawi to Chad with a possible occurrence of the species or a closely related species found in Turkey. The type specimen was discovered during trenching excavations on the upper member of the Rawi Formation by Louis Leakey in the 1930s. The specimen was found with Ceratotherium simum, Suidae such as Metridiochoerus andrewsi, a Hippopotamus gorgops, and a nearly complete pygmy hippopotamus mandible.

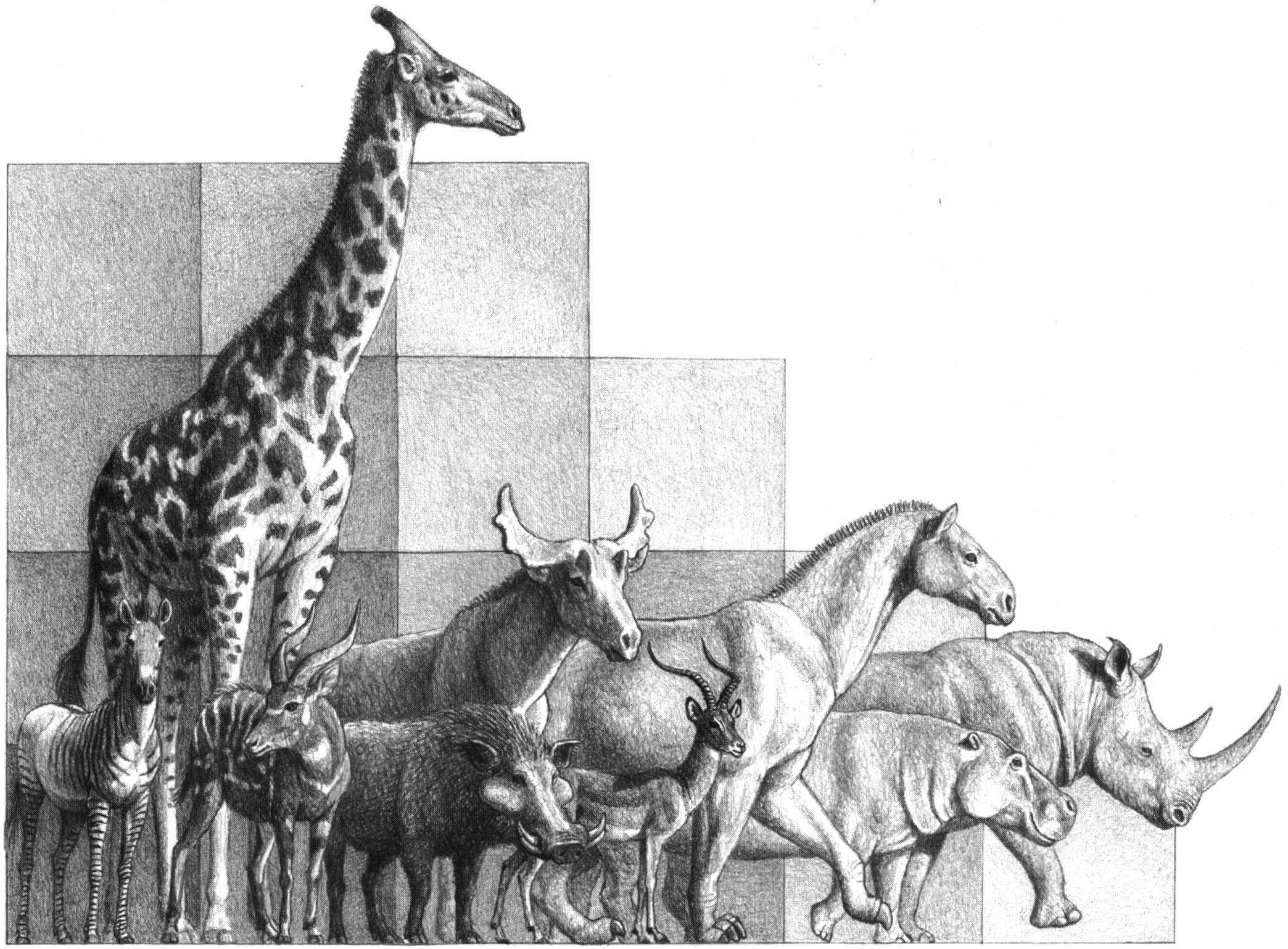
Restoration of G. jumae (top left) and other ungulates from the Pliocene of eastern Africa, by Mauricio Antón

The species is considered a possible ancestor to the modern giraffes.
