= Versoporcus =

Versoporcus Temporal range: 13.65–9.7 Ma

Scientific classification
- Kingdom: Animalia
- Phylum: Chordata
- Class: Mammalia
- Order: Artiodactyla
- Family: Suidae
- Subfamily: †Tetraconodontinae
- Genus: †Versoporcus; Pickford, 2014

Species
- V. steinheimensis (Fraas, 1870) (type); V. grivensis (Gaillard, 1899)

Extinct genus of even-toed ungulates

Versoporcus was an extinct genus of even-toed ungulates that existed during the Miocene in Europe. Two species are recognized, V. grivensis and V. steinheimensis.
