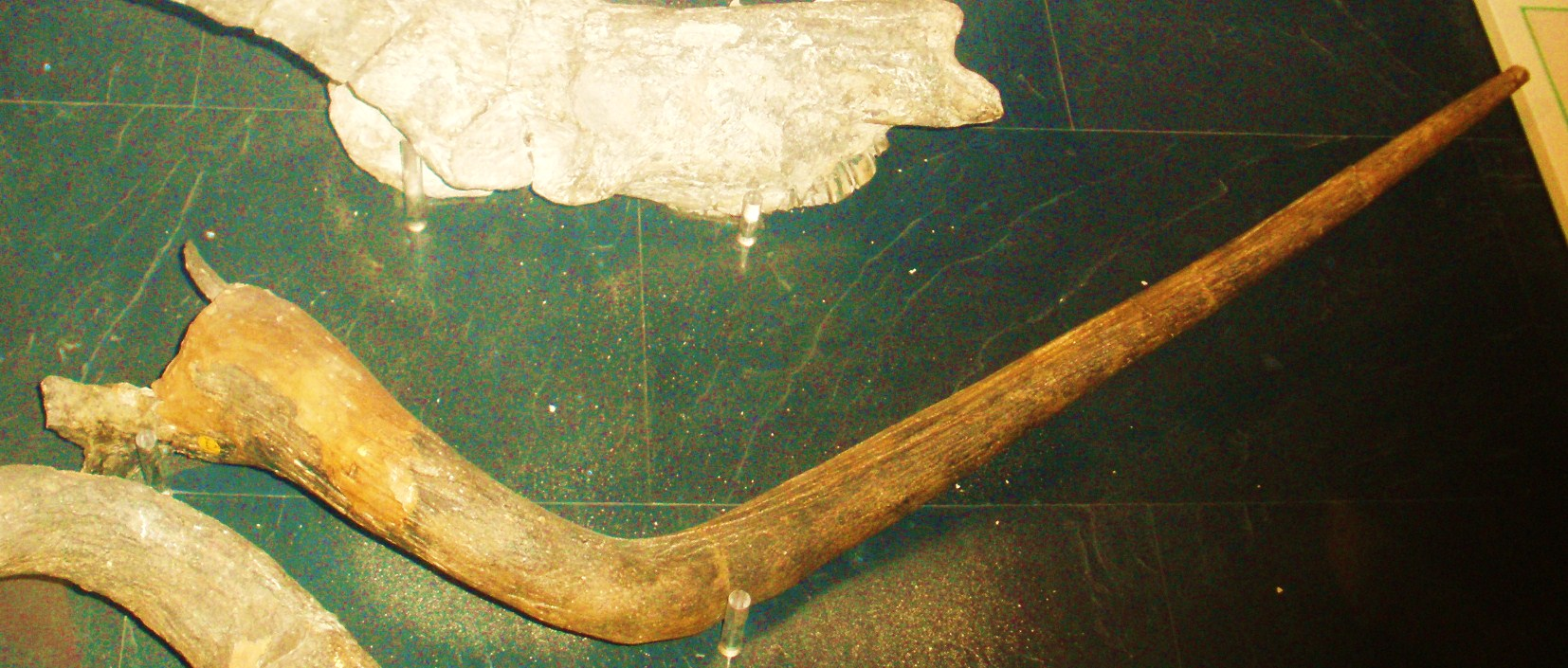

Scientific classification
- Kingdom: Animalia
- Phylum: Chordata
- Class: Mammalia
- Order: Artiodactyla
- Family: Bovidae
- Subfamily: Alcelaphinae
- Genus: Beatragus
- Species: †B. antiquus

Binomial name
- †Beatragus antiquus Leakey, 1965

= Beatragus antiquus =

Beatragus antiquus Temporal range: Late Pliocene - Early Pleistocene

Extinct species of antelope

Beatragus antiquus, the ancient hirola, is an extinct species of alcelaphine antelope that lived in Africa during the Plio-Pleistocene.

== Discovery ==
Beatragus antiquus was first described by Louis Leakey in 1965 from material discovered at the Olduvai Gorge (Beds I and II) in Tanzania. Other remains dated slightly earlier have also been found in the Omo valley and possibly at Elandsfontein in South Africa.

== Description ==
The ancient hirola was larger than the modern day hirola, and the two together may represent a chronospecies. Other differences with the hirola include horn cores diverging immediately from their bases, a lessening of distal divergence, more upright insertions in side view and wider and more convex frontals of the horn cores.

== Paleoecology ==
It lived in vast savannas alongside other alcelaphine antelopes, such as a small species of Damaliscus and Parmularius. The ancient hirola probably declined as a result of diminished habitat preferences, and the modern species, with its smaller size and less energy demands, eventually evolved to cope with the new ecologically impoverished landscape.
