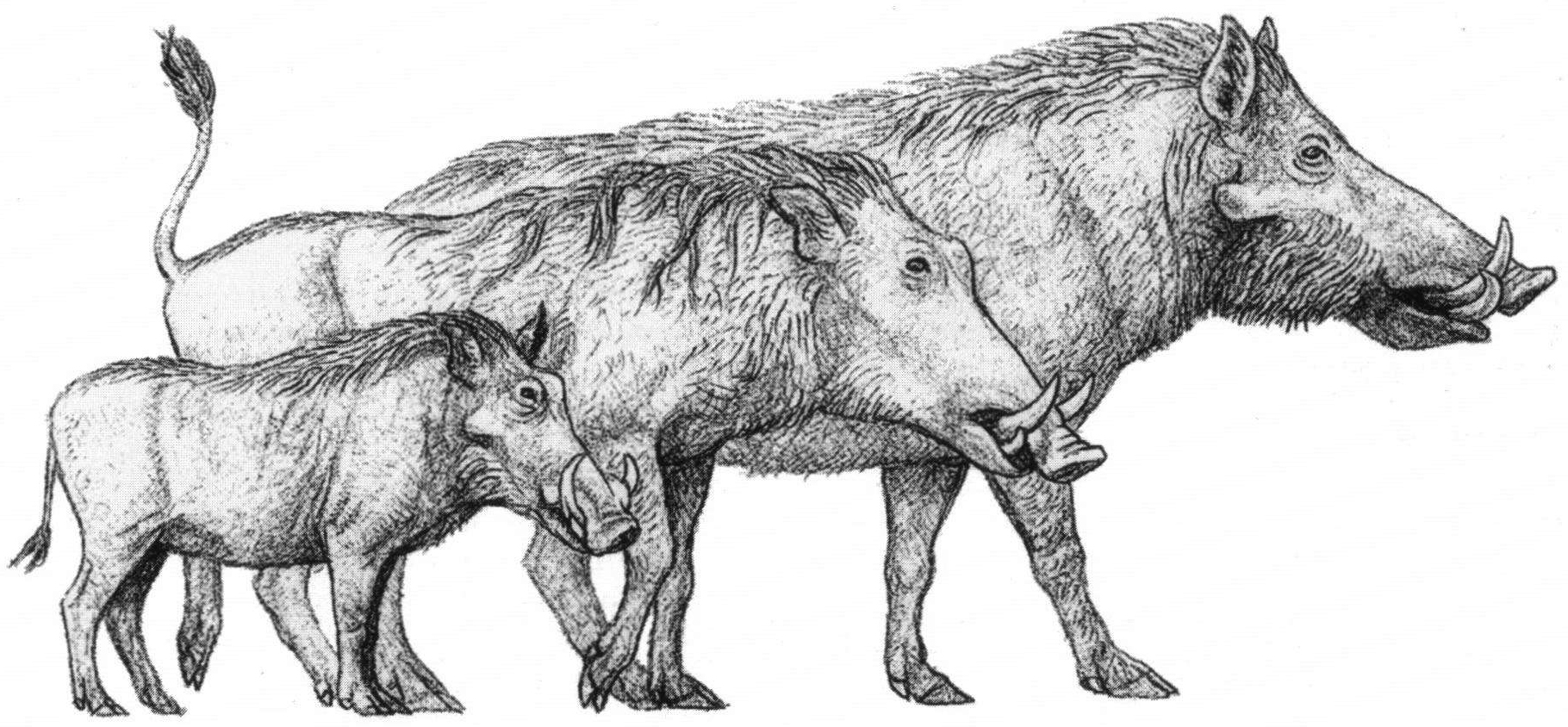
- The extant warthog (left) in comparison with the extinct Metridiochoerus andrewsi (centre) and Notochoerus eulius (right)

Scientific classification
- Kingdom: Animalia
- Phylum: Chordata
- Class: Mammalia
- Order: Artiodactyla
- Family: Suidae
- Subfamily: †Tetraconodontinae
- Genus: †Notochoerus

Species
- N. capensis; N. clarki; N. euilus; N. scotti

= Notochoerus =

Notochoerus Temporal range: Miocene–Pliocene

Extinct genus of mammals

Notochoerus is an extinct genus of very large pigs from the subfamily Tetraconodontinae. Fossils have been found in Africa, notably Uganda and Ethiopia.

== Description ==
Notochoerus were among the largest pigs ever, with adults weighing up to 450 kg (990 lb). These pigs were likely derived from the genus Nyanzachoerus. Like other tetraconodontine pigs, the males had ornamental growths on their skulls, formed from enamel.

Its name means "Cape southern hog" because of the Greek words "notos (Νότιος)" and "choiros (γουρούνι) and the epithet "capensis" referencing where it was first found in 1925 in South Africa.

== Palaeoecology ==
Notochoerus is believed to have been specialised for arid environments and fed on abrasive vegetation, and some researchers attribute this supposed overspecialisation to have caused the Notochoerus to be maladapted for more variable environments. Notochoerus jaegeri had more hypsodont teeth in comparison to the contemporary Nyanzachoerus kanamensis, suggesting the former relied more heavily on grazing compared to the latter.
