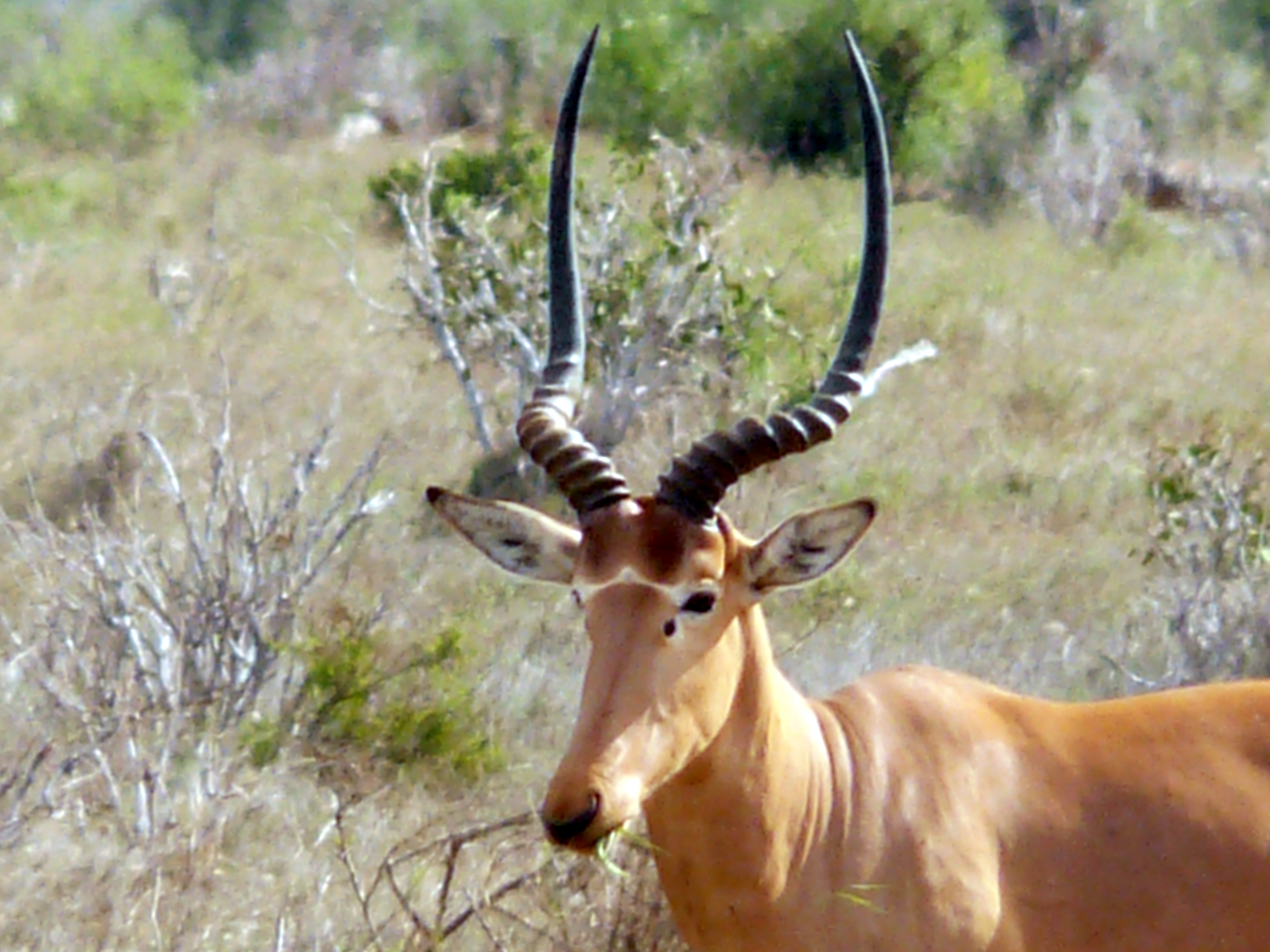
- Hirola (Beatragus hunteri)

Scientific classification
- Kingdom: Animalia
- Phylum: Chordata
- Class: Mammalia
- Order: Artiodactyla
- Family: Bovidae
- Subfamily: Alcelaphinae
- Genus: Beatragus; Heller, 1912

Type species
- Beatragus hunteri Sclater, 1889

Species
- Beatragus hunteri – hirola; †Beatragus antiquus – ancient hirola; †Beatragus vrbae; †Beatragus whitei

= Beatragus =

Beatragus Temporal range: Pliocene - Recent

Genus of mammals

Beatragus is a genus of alcelaphine antelope. The hirola (Beatragus hunteri) is the only living representative, and three extinct species are known, all from Africa.

The hirola and the larger Beatragus antiquus may together represent different phases of a chronospecies; the living hirola probably declined in size as a result of an ecologically impoverished landscape.
