= Retroporcus =

Retroporcus Temporal range: 13.65–9.7 Ma

Scientific classification
- Kingdom: Animalia
- Phylum: Chordata
- Class: Mammalia
- Order: Artiodactyla
- Family: Suidae
- Subfamily: †Tetraconodontinae
- Genus: †Retroporcus; Pickford and Laurent, 2014

Species
- R. complutensis Pickford and Laurent, 2014 (type); R. matritensis (Golpe-Posse, 1972); R. sindiensis (Lydekker, 1884)

Extinct genus of even-toed ungulates

Retroporcus was an extinct genus of even-toed ungulates that existed during the Miocene in Europe, the Indian subcontinent, and Turkey.
