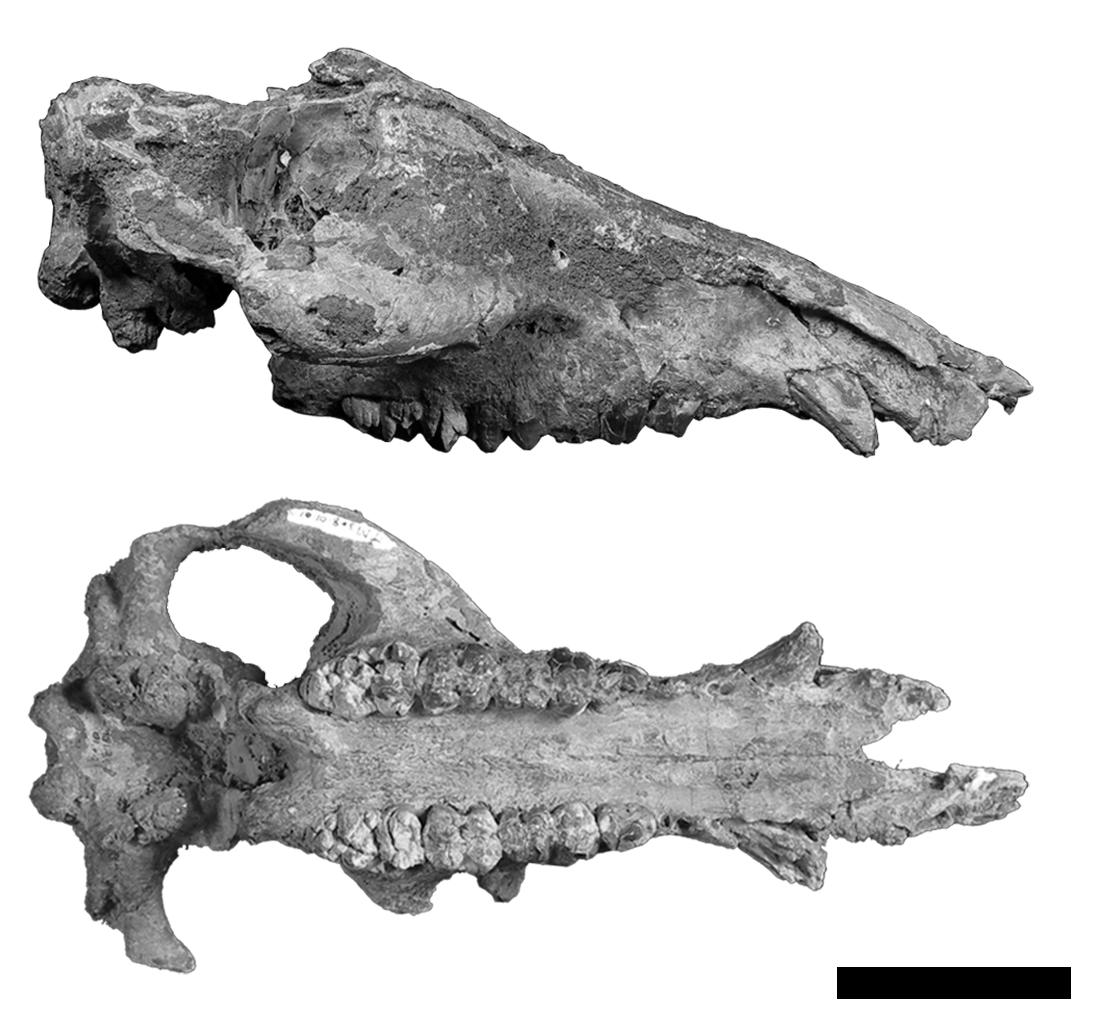
- Nyanzachoerus khinzir skull in lateral and ventral view

Scientific classification
- Kingdom: Animalia
- Phylum: Chordata
- Class: Mammalia
- Order: Artiodactyla
- Family: Suidae
- Subfamily: †Tetraconodontinae
- Genus: †Nyanzachoerus; Leakey, 1958

Type species
- †Nyanzachoerus syrticus

Species
- N. syrticus; N. kanamensis; N. devauxi; N. jaegeri; N. waylandi; N. pattersoni; N. tulotos; N. plicatus; N. australis; N. khinzir; N. nakaliensis

= Nyanzachoerus =

Nyanzachoerus Temporal range: Miocene–Pliocene

Extinct genus of mammals

Nyanzachoerus is an extinct genus of the pig family (Suidae) belonging to the subfamily Tetraconodontinae. The several species of Nyanzachoerus lived in Africa from the Miocene to Pliocene.

== Distribution ==
N. waylandi is known from fossils found in Uganda, as well as from tentative remains from Ethiopia.

== Description ==
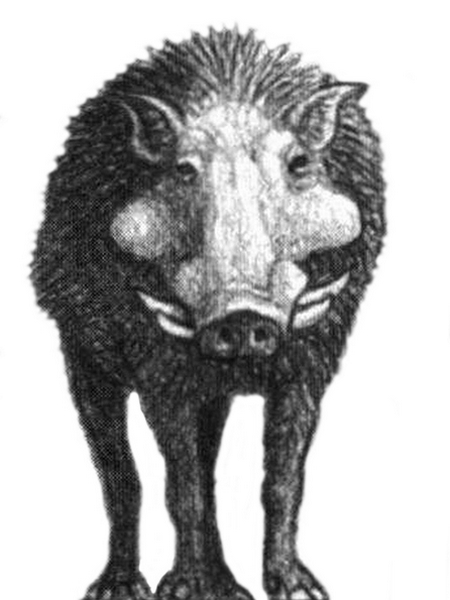
Life restoration of N. syrticus

This was a large pig-like creature, larger than the living species.

Fossils of males of these species show that they had large lumps on their muzzle and widely flaring cheekbones. Their tusks were only of moderate size. It can be assumed that the ornaments were used as a mating display.

== Palaeobiology ==
=== Diet ===
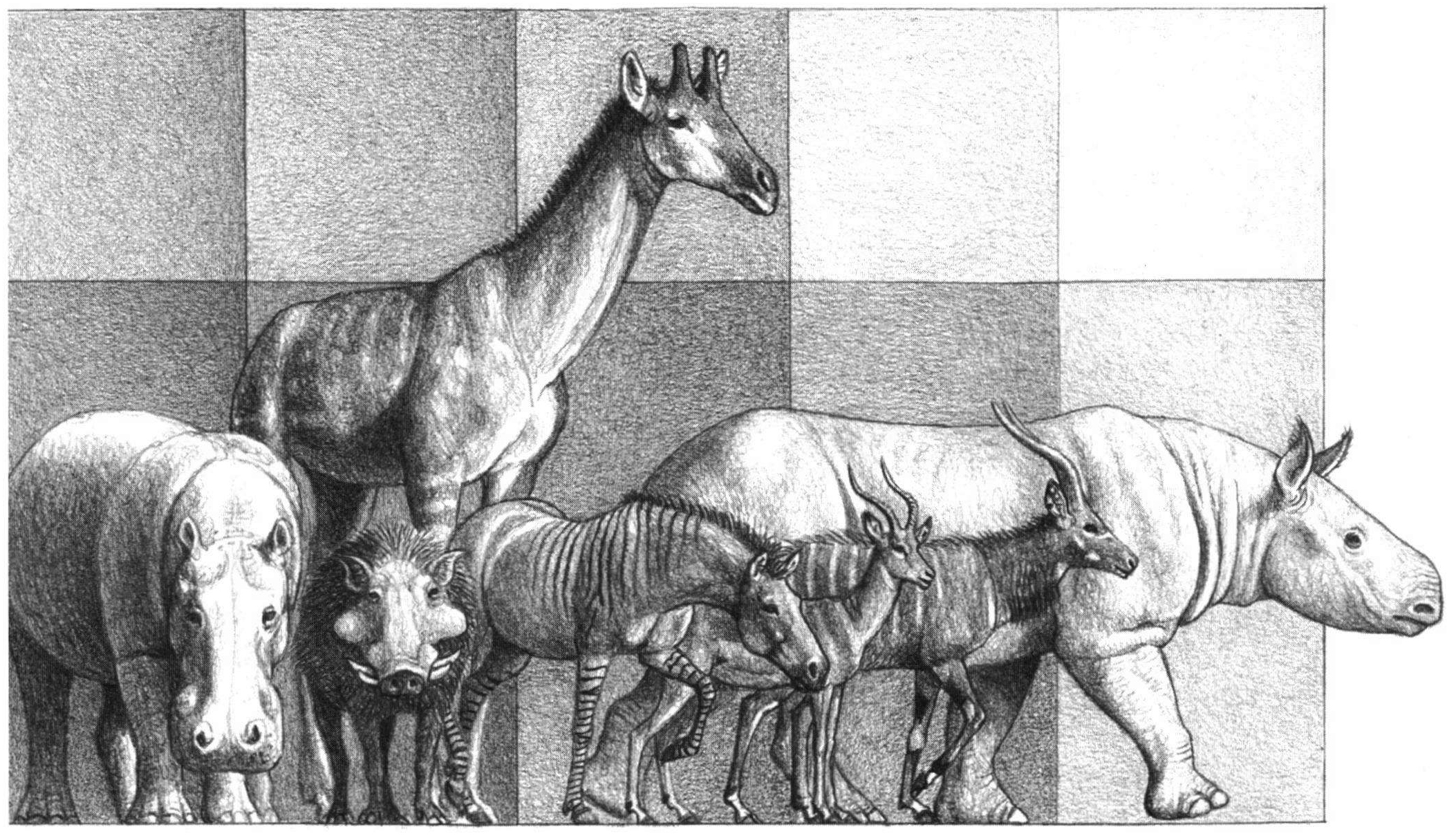
Ungulates from the Late Miocene of Africa, including N. syrticus

Dental microwear analysis of N. pattersoni fossils found at Kanapoi indicate that it was a mixed feeder, partitioning its dietary niche with Notochoerus jaegeri, which was a grazer. It has been suggested that it was replaced by Notochoerus around 4 Ma, as the forest cover of the Turkana basin diminished.

== Species ==
A total of 11 species have been described.

- N. syrticus, Leonardi 1952
- N. kanamensis, Leakey 1958
- N. devauxi, Arambourg 1968
- N. jaegeri, Coppens 1971
- N. waylandi, Cooke and Coryndon 1970
- N. pattersoni, Cooke and Ewer 1972
- N. tulotos, Cooke and Ewer 1972
- N. plicatus, Cooke and Ewer 1972
- N. australis, Cooke and Hendey 1992
- N. khinzir, Boisserie, Souron, Mackaye, Likius, Vignaud and Brunet, 2014
- N. nakaliensis, Tsubamoto et al., 2020
