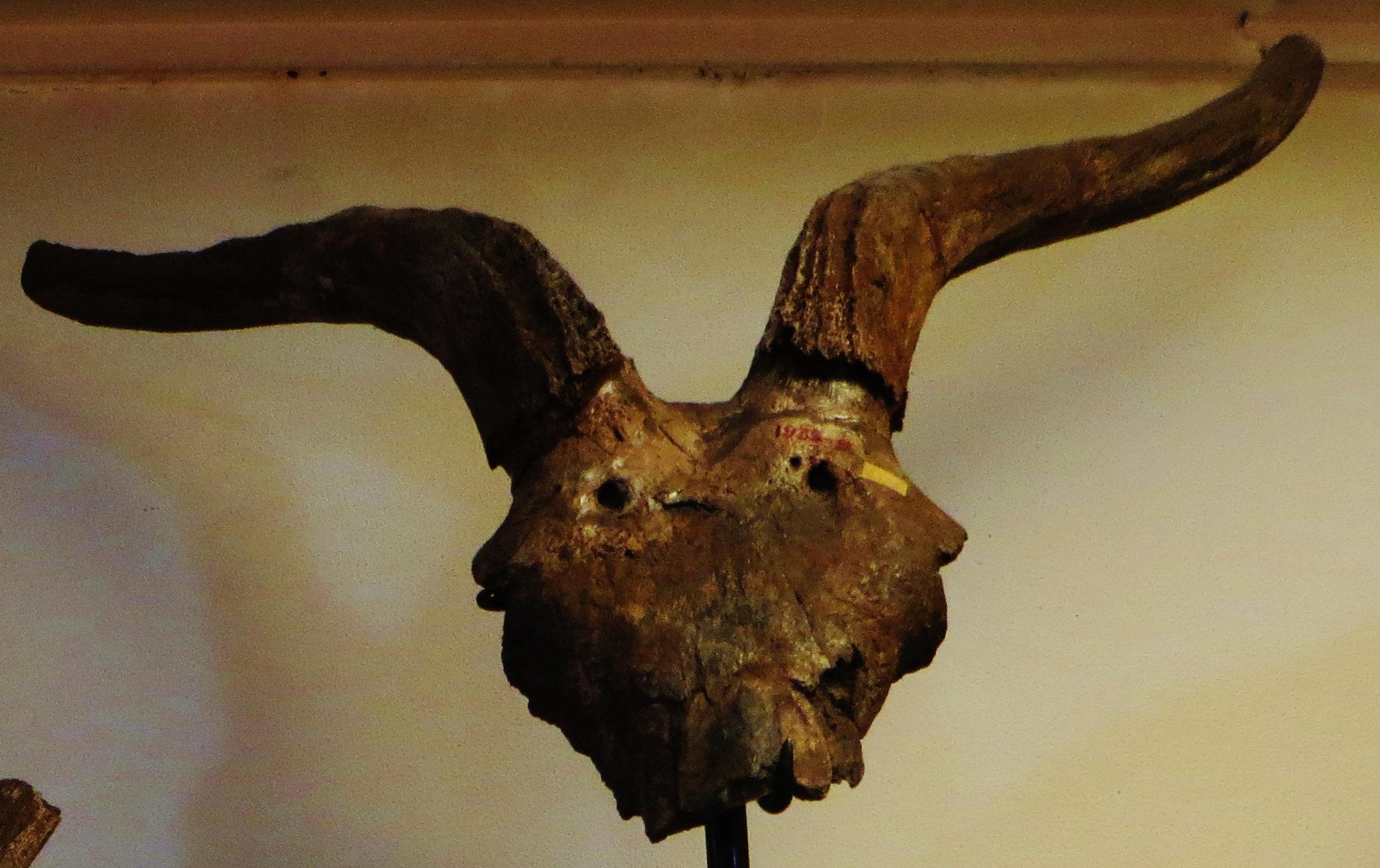
- Partial cranium of Menelikia lyrocera

Scientific classification
- Kingdom: Animalia
- Phylum: Chordata
- Class: Mammalia
- Order: Artiodactyla
- Family: Bovidae
- Subfamily: Reduncinae
- Genus: †Menelikia; Arambourg, 1941

Type species
- †Menelikia lyrocera Arambourg, 1941

Species
- M. leakeyi; M. lyrocera

= Menelikia =

Menelikia Temporal range: Pliocene–Pleistocene

Extinct family of mammals

Menelikia is a genus of extinct Artiodactyl mammals, belonging to the bovids. It lived from the middle Pliocene to the middle Pleistocene (circa 4.1 - 1.4 million years ago) and its fossils are found in East Africa.

== Description ==
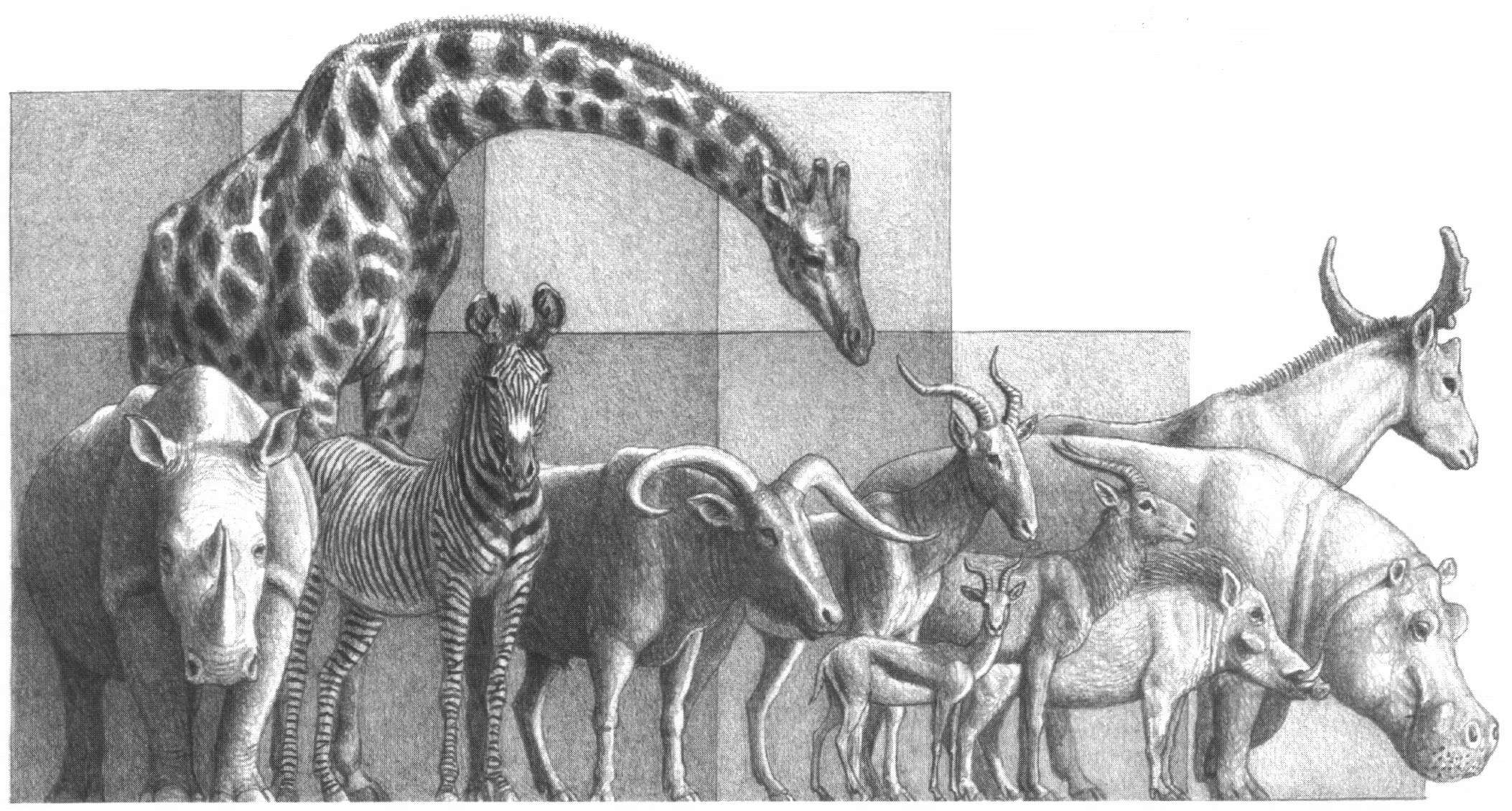
Ungulates from the Pleistocene of Eastern Africa, including Menelikia

This animal was likely similar to the contemporary Kobus ellipsiprymnus or Kobus megaceros. It was a medium-to-large sized antelope.

== Classification ==
The genus Menelikia was coined by Arambourg in 1941 on the basis of fossil finds in the east Africa Plio-Pleistocene. The type specimen for Menelikia lyrocera lived between 3.4 and 1.4 million years ago. The species M. leakeyi, described in 1991, is slightly older (4.1 - 2.5 million years old). Menelikia is a part of the group Reduncini, which are African bovids with numerous species of antelopes that have semiaquatic lifestyles. They are currently confined to Africa but in the past have had wider ranges (for example Sivacobus).

== Paleobiology ==
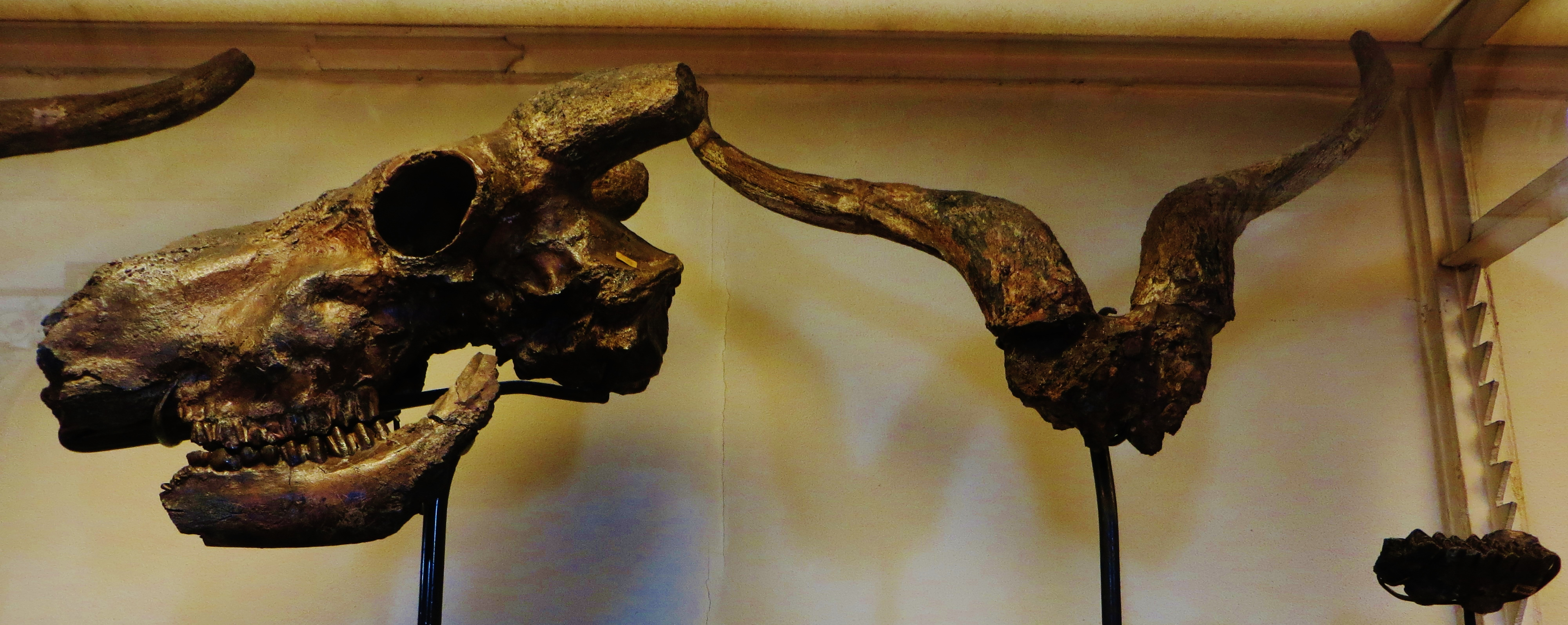
Cranium, mandible and horns of Menelikia lyrocera

In general Menelikia possessed characteristics of a mixed-feeding browser.

== Bibliography ==
- J. M. Harris. 1991. Family Bovidae. Koobi Fora Research Project: The Fossil Ungulates: Geology, Fossil Artiodactyls, and Palaeoenvironments 3:139-320
- Spencer, L. M. 1997. Dietary adaptations of Plio-Pleistocene Bovidae: implications for hominid habitat use. Journal of Human Evolution 32:201–228.
- M. G. Leakey and J. M. Harris. 2003. Lothagam: the dawn of humanity in eastern Africa. Lothagam: the dawn of humanity in eastern Africa 678
