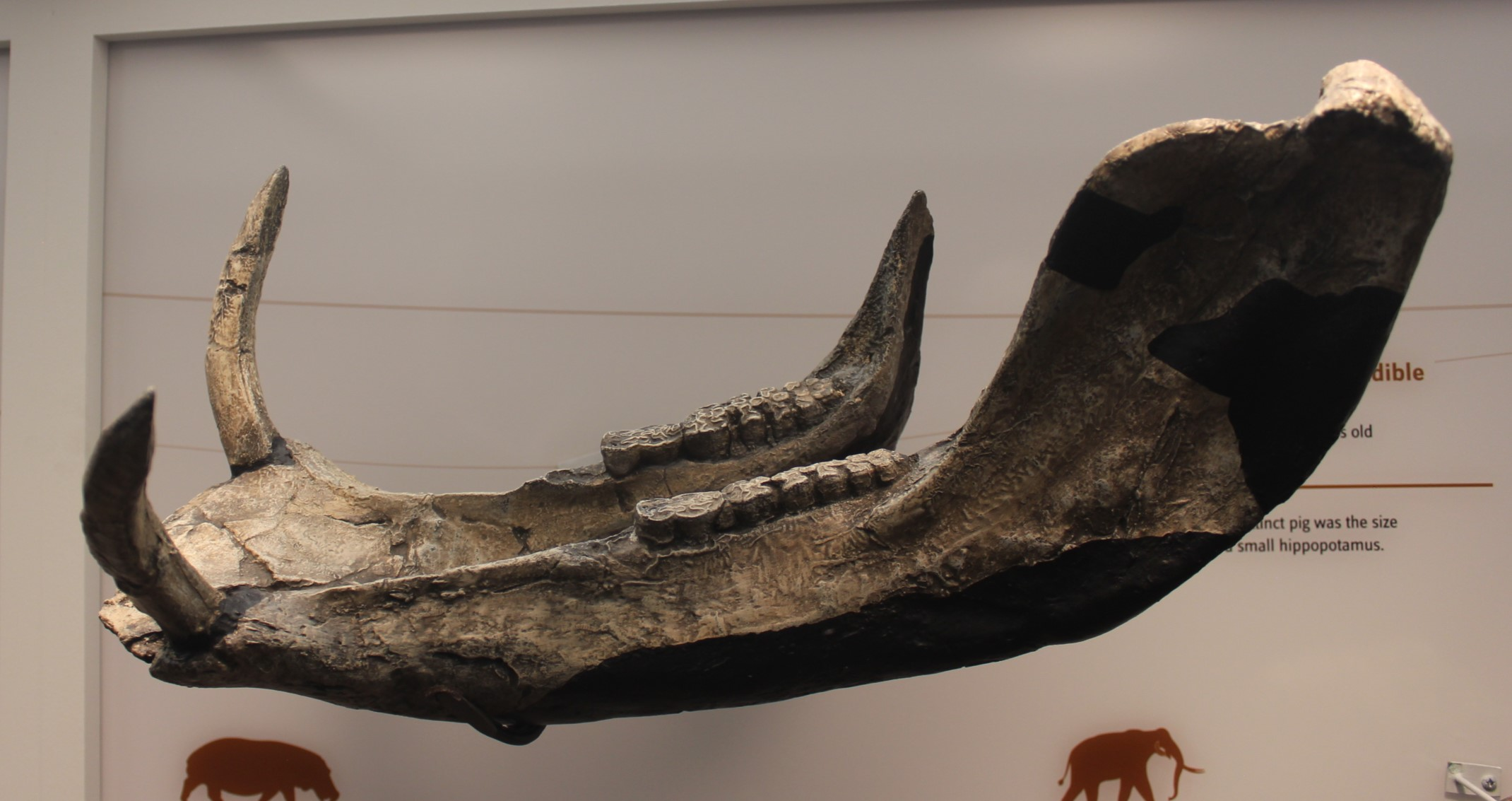
- Jaw of M. hopwoodi at National Museum of Natural History
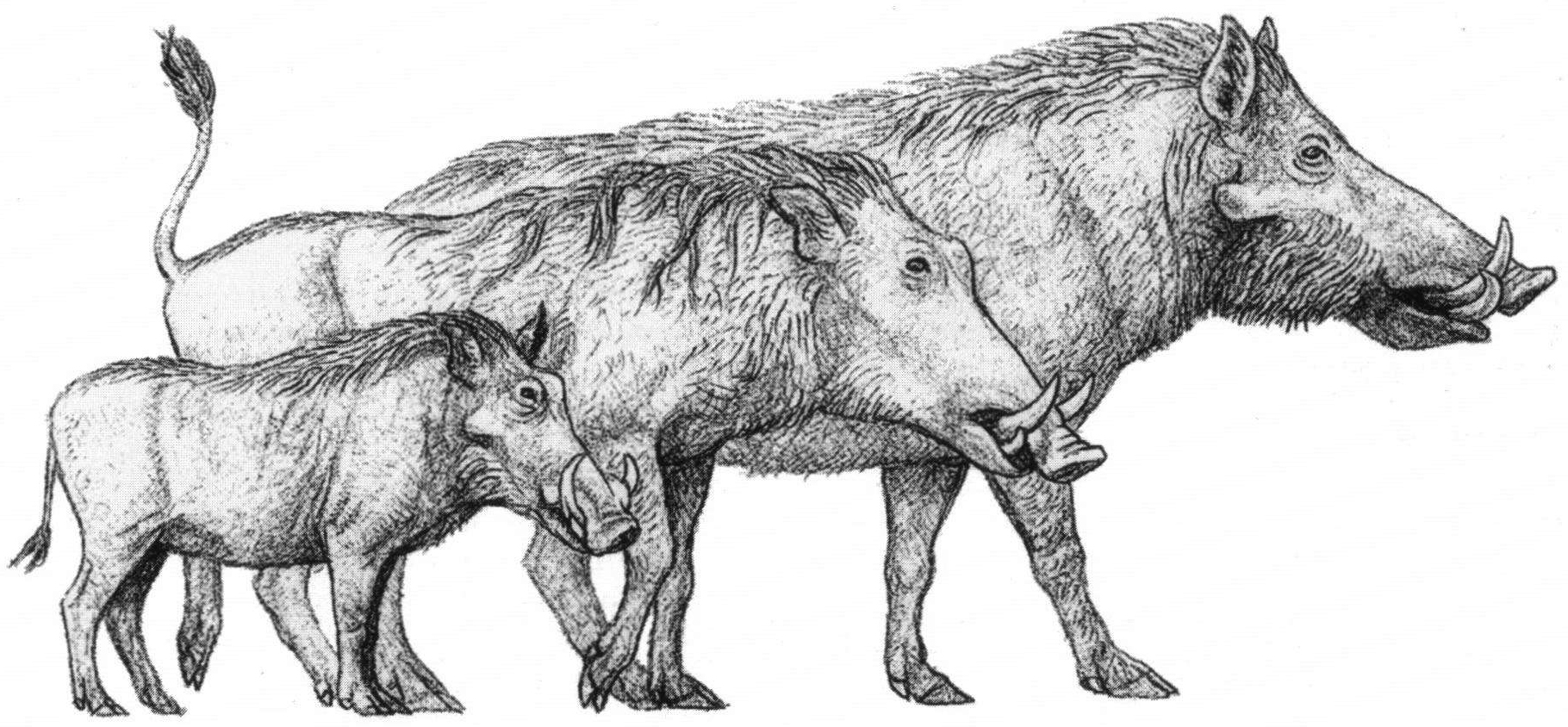
- M. andrewsi (centre) compared to a living Desert warthog (left) and Notochoerus eulius (right)

Scientific classification
- Kingdom: Animalia
- Phylum: Chordata
- Class: Mammalia
- Order: Artiodactyla
- Family: Suidae
- Subfamily: Suinae
- Genus: †Metridiochoerus; Hopwood, 1926

Type species
- †Metridiochoerus andrewsi Hopwood, 1926

Species
- M. andrewsi; M. compactus; M. hopwoodi; M. jacksoni; M. meadowsi; M. modestus

= Metridiochoerus =

Metridiochoerus Temporal range: Late Pliocene to Late Pleistocene

Extinct genus of mammals

Metridiochoerus is an extinct genus of swine known from the Pliocene and Pleistocene of Africa. It is also known as the giant warthog.

== Chronology ==
The oldest specimen dates to around 3.4 million years ago from the Usno Formation in Ethiopia. It probably evolved from a recent immigrant from Eurasia, which has been suggested to be the European "Postpotamochoerus" provincialis. The youngest remains of the genus date to the Late Pleistocene in southern Africa (Zimbabwe, and possibly South Africa).

== Description ==
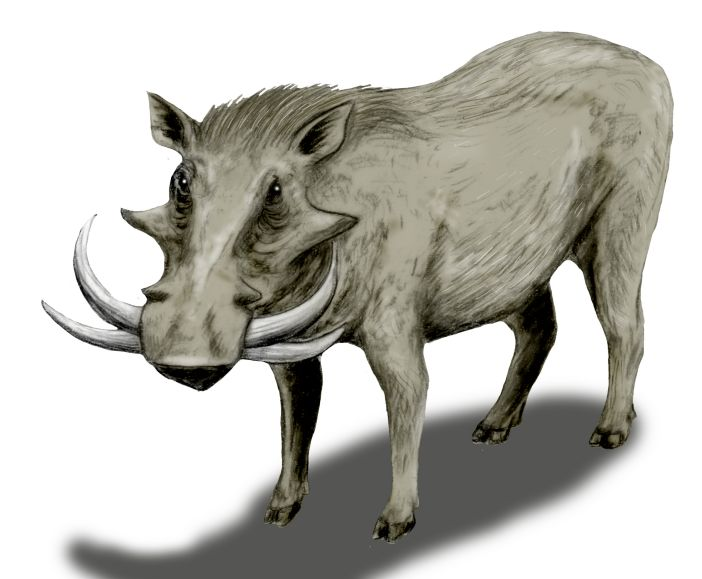
Restoration

Metridiochoerus was a large animal, 1.5 metres (4.9 ft) in length, resembling a larger warthog. It had two pairs of large tusks which were pointed sideways and curved upwards. The teeth, especially the third molars, become increasingly high-crowned (hypsodont) in later species.

== Biology ==
The various species are usually thought to have been grazers, though this has been questioned for the earliest, low-crowned species.
