= Hirola =

- A pair of hirola near Voi, Kenya

Conservation status
- Critically Endangered (IUCN 3.1)

Scientific classification
- Kingdom: Animalia
- Phylum: Chordata
- Class: Mammalia
- Order: Artiodactyla
- Family: Bovidae
- Subfamily: Alcelaphinae
- Genus: Beatragus
- Species: B. hunteri

Binomial name
- Beatragus hunteri (Sclater, 1889)
- Range of the hirola

Synonyms
- Cobus hunteri Sclater, 1889

Species of antelope

The hirola (Beatragus hunteri), also called Hunter's hartebeest or Hunter's antelope, is a critically endangered antelope species found as of now, only in Kenya along the border of Somalia. It was first described by the big game hunter and zoologist H.C.V. Hunter in 1888. It is the only living member of the genus Beatragus, though other species are known from the fossil record. The global hirola population is estimated at 300–500 animals and there are none in captivity. According to a document produced by the International Union for Conservation of Nature "the loss of the hirola would be the first extinction of a mammalian genus on mainland Africa in modern human history".

== Description ==
The hirola is a medium-sized antelope, tan to rufous-tawny in colour with slightly lighter under parts, predominantly white inner ears and a white tail which extends down to the hocks. It has very sharp, lyrate horns which lack a basal pedicle and are ridged along three quarters of their length. As hirola age their coat darkens towards a slate grey and the number of ridges along their horns increases. Hirola have large, dark sub-orbital glands used for marking their territories and give them the name "four-eyed antelope". They have white spectacles around their eyes and an inverted white chevron running between the eyes. The horns, hooves, udders, nostrils, lips and ear tips are black. Males and females look similar although males are slightly larger with thicker horns and darker coats.

Several sources have recorded precise measurements from both captive and wild hirola. The following are maximum and minimum values taken from all sources: height at the shoulder: 99–125 cm (39–49 in; 3.25–4.10 ft), body weight: 73–118 kg (161–260 lb), head and body length: 1.2–2 m (3 ft 11 in – 6 ft 7 in), horn length: 44–72 cm (17–28 in; 1.44–2.36 ft), horn spread (greatest outside width): 15–32 cm (5.9–12.6 in), tail length: 30–45 cm (12–18 in), ear length: 19 cm (7.5 in). It is not stated whether horn length was measured direct from base to tip or along the curve of the horn. There is no data on how long hirola live in the wild but in captivity they have been known to live for 15 years.

== Taxonomy ==
Authorities agree that the hirola belongs in the subfamily Alcelaphinae within the family Bovidae but there has been debate about the genus in which it should be placed. The Alcelaphinae contains hartebeest, wildebeest and topi, korrigum, bontebok, blesbok, tiang and tsessebe.

When it was first described the hirola was given the common name Hunter's hartebeest. Despite this it was placed in the genus Damaliscus with the topi and given the scientific name Damaliscus hunteri. Newer theories have classified it as a subspecies of the topi (Damaliscus lunatus hunteri) or placed it within its own genus as Beatragus hunteri.

Recent genetic analyses on karyotypic and mitochondrial DNA support the theory that the hirola is distinct from the topi and should be placed in its own genus. They also indicate that the hirola is in fact more closely related to Alcelaphus than to Damaliscus. Placing the hirola in its own genus is further supported by behavioural observations. Neither Alcelaphus nor Damaliscus engage in flehmen, where the male tastes the urine of the female to determine oestrus. They are the only genera of bovids to have lost this behaviour. Hirola still engage in flehmen although it is less obvious than in other species.

The genus Beatragus originated around 3.1 million years ago and was once widespread with fossils found in Ethiopia, Djibouti, Tanzania and South Africa.

== Ecology ==
The hirola is adapted to arid environments with annual rainfall averaging 300 to 600 millimetres (12 to 24 in). Their habitats range from open grassland with light bush to wooded savannahs with low shrubs and scattered trees, most often on sandy soils. Despite the arid environments they inhabit, hirola appear to be able to survive independently of surface water. Andanje observed hirola drinking on only 10 occasions in 674 observations (1.5%) and all 10 observations of drinking occurred at the height of the dry season. Hirola do however favour short green grass and in 392 of 674 observations (58%) hirola were grazing on growths of short green grass around waterholes. This association with waterholes may have led to reports that hirola are dependent on surface water.

Hirola are primarily grazers but browse may be important in the dry season. They favour grasses with a high leaf to stem ratio and Chloris and Digitaria species are believed to be important in their diet. Kingdon does not consider the ecological requirements of the hirola unusual and in fact considers them to be more generalist than either Connochaetes spp. or Damaliscus. A vet who examined the digestive tract of several hirola concluded that they were well adapted to eating dry region grasses and roughage. They feed on the dominant grasses of the region and Kingdon (1982) believes that quantity is more important than quality in the hirola's diet.

Hirola are often found in association with other species, particularly oryx, Grant's gazelle, Burchell's zebra and topi. They avoid Coke's hartebeest, African buffalo, and elephant. Whilst hirola avoid direct association with livestock, they reportedly prefer the short grass in areas where livestock have grazed.

== Social structure and reproduction ==
Female hirola give birth alone and may remain separate from the herd for up to two months, making them vulnerable to predation. Eventually the female will rejoin a nursery herd consisting of females and their young. Nursery herds number from 5 to 40, although the mean herd size is 7–9. They are usually accompanied by an adult male.

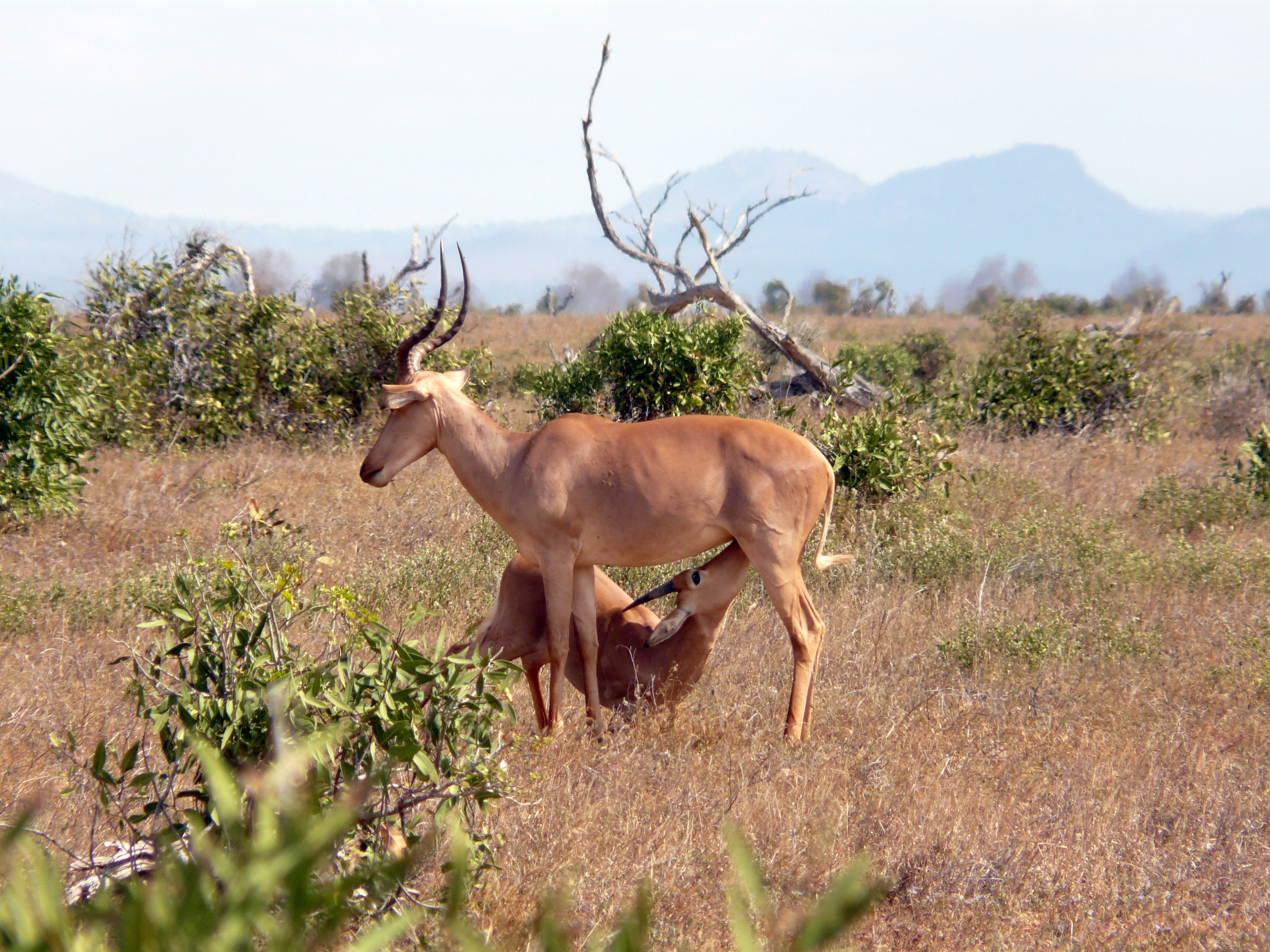
Hirola calf suckling, Tsavo East National Park, 2011

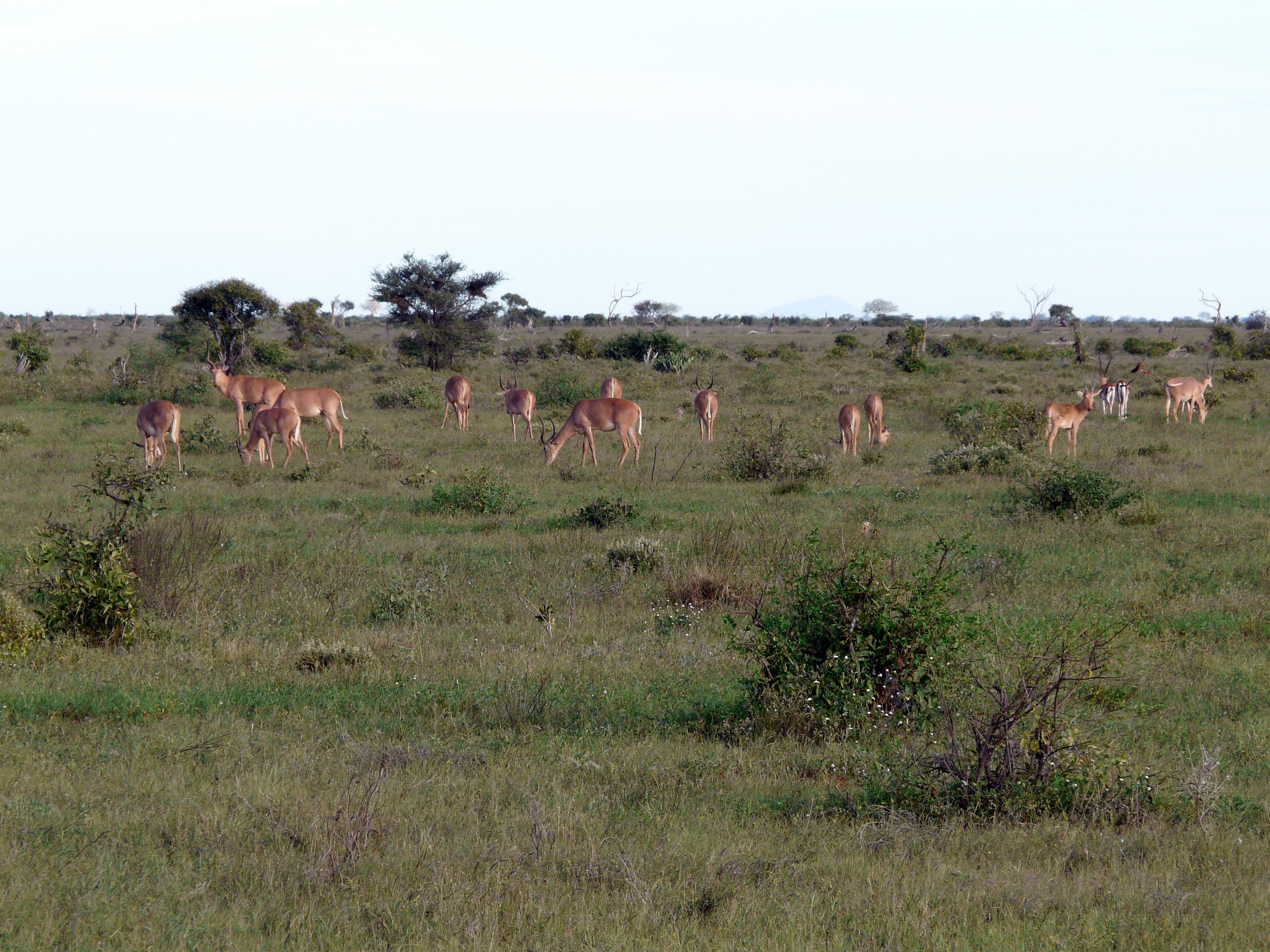
Nursery herd, Tsavo East National Park, 2011)

Young hirola leave the nursery herd at around nine months of age and form various temporary associations. They may gather together in mixed or single sex herds of up to three individuals; sub-adult or subordinate adult males may form bachelor herds of 2-38 individuals; female sub-adults may join an adult male, and if no other hirola are present, young hirola may attach themselves to a herd of Grant's gazelles or simply spend most of their time alone.

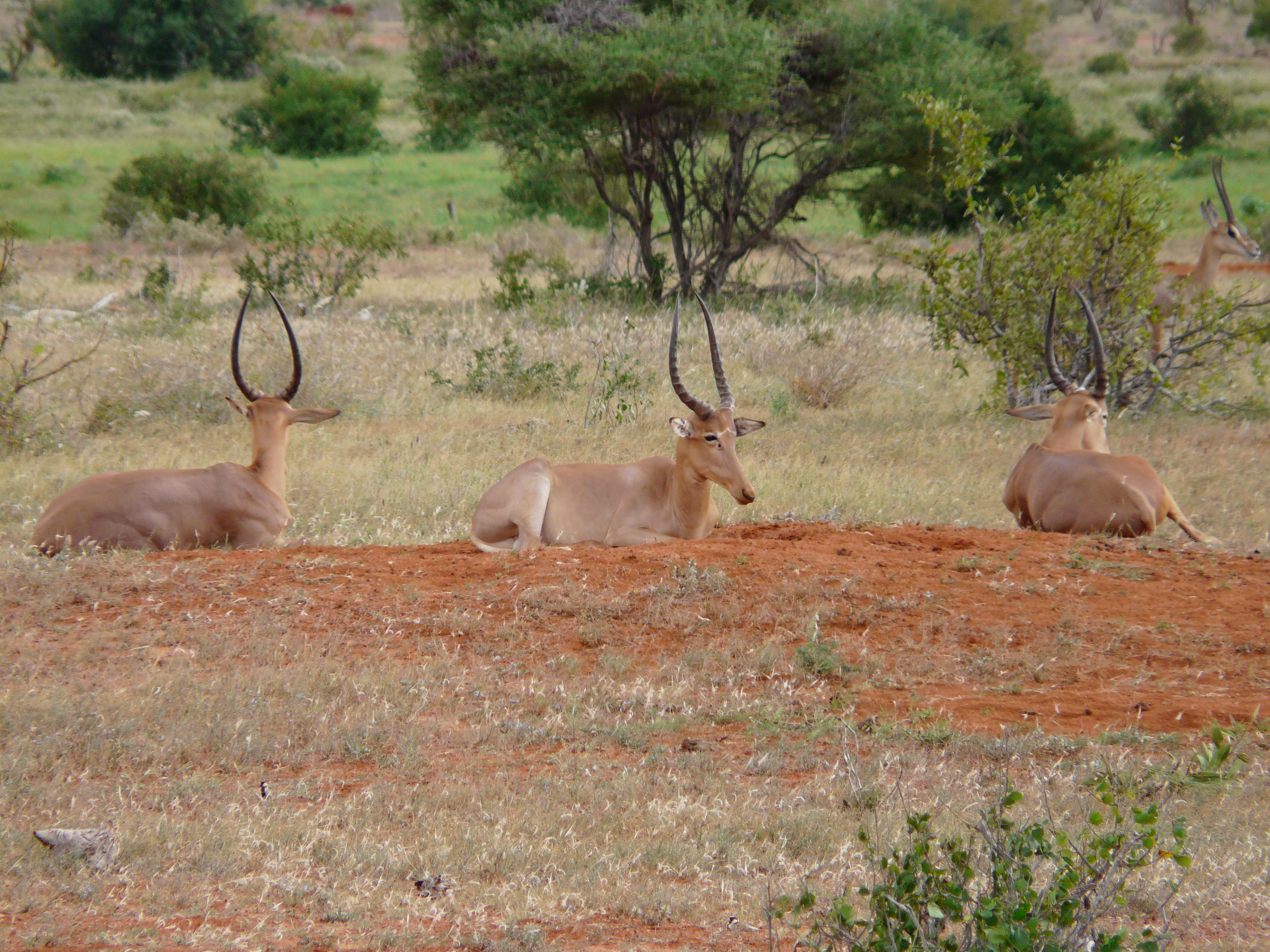
Bachelor herd consisting of three sub-adult males, Tsavo East National Park, 2011

Adult males attempt to secure a territory on good pasture. These territories are up to 7 square kilometres (2.7 sq mi) and are marked with dung, secretions from the sub-orbital glands and by stamping grounds where males scrape the soil with their hooves and slash the vegetation with their horns. It has been suggested that at low population densities adult males abandon territory defence and will instead follow a nursery herd. Nursery herds do not defend a territory but do have home ranges which overlap the territories of several adult males. The size of a nursery herd's home range varies from 26 to 164.7 square kilometres (10.0 to 63.6 sq mi) with a mean size of 81.5 square kilometres (31.5 sq mi).

Nursery herds are relatively stable but bachelor herds are very unstable with a fission fusion dynamic. In the 1970s hirola were observed forming aggregations of up to 300 individuals to take advantage of scarce, but spatially clumped, resources during the dry season. Information is lacking on male territoriality and how it relates to mating success, how and when hirola join a herd and how new herds are established.

Hirola are seasonal breeders with young being born from September to November. Data on age of sexual maturity and gestation period are not available for wild hirola however in captivity gestation was around 7.5 months (227–242 days) with one female mating at 1.4 years old and giving birth at 1.9 years. Another pair of hirola mated when they were 1.7 years of age. In captivity one of the main causes of mortality is wounds caused by intra-hirola aggression, including aggression between females.

== Threats ==
The reasons for the historic decline of the hirola are not known but is likely a combination of factors including disease (particularly rinderpest), hunting, severe drought, predation, competition for food and water from domestic livestock and habitat loss caused by woody plant encroachment as a result of the extirpation of elephants within its range.

This hartebeest prefers areas that are used by livestock which puts them at increased risk from diseases like tuberculosis. It might be vulnerable to poaching, and is also subject to the natural phenomena of predation and competition with other wild herbivores, particularly topi and Coke's hartebeest, which the IUCN also calls 'threats'.

== Population size and distribution ==
The hirola's natural range is an area of no more than 1,500 km^{2} (580 sq mi) on the Kenyan-Somali border, but there is also a translocated population in Tsavo East National Park. The natural population in the 1970s was likely to number 10,000–15,000 individuals but there was an 85–90% decline between 1983 and 1985. A survey in 1995 and 1996 estimated the population to number between 500 and 2,000 individuals with 1,300 as the most reasonable estimate. A 2010 survey estimated a population of 402–466 hirola.

A translocated population was established in Kenya's Tsavo East National Park with translocations in 1963 and 1996 (Hofmann, 1996; Andanje & Ottichilo, 1999; Butynski, 1999; East, 1999). The 1963 translocation released 30 animals and the first survey in December 1995 concluded that there were at least 76 hirola present in Tsavo at the time. Eight months later a further 29 translocated hirola were released in to Tsavo, at least six of which were pregnant at the time (Andanje, 1997). By December 2000 the hirola population in Tsavo had returned to 77 individuals (Andanje, 2002) and by 2011 the population was estimated at 76 individuals.

In 2013, 9 individuals from 7 different herds were fitted with GPS-collars, scheduled to drop-off in June 2014, in north-eastern Kenya. This marked the first time that the species was GPS-collared in the wild. These collaring events served as a purpose to understand the basic ecology, the natural history, movements patterns and population demographics of the species.

== Status and conservation ==
Hirola are critically endangered and their numbers continue to decline in the wild. There are between 300 and 500 individuals in the wild and none currently in captivity.

Despite being one of the rarest antelopes, conservation measures for the antelope have so far been marginal. The Arawale National Reserve was created in 1973 as a small sanctuary for them, but has been left unmaintained since the 1980s. In 2005, four local communities in the Ijara District, in collaboration with Terra Nuova, established the Ishaqbini Hirola Conservancy. As of 2014, a 23 km^{2} (8.9 sq mi) predator-proof fenced sanctuary has been constructed at Ishaqbini and a founding population of 48 hirola is breeding well within the sanctuary.
