= Arawale National Reserve =

Protected area in Kenya

- IUCN category VI (protected area with sustainable use of natural resources)
- Location within Kenya
- Location: North Eastern Province, Kenya
- Nearest city: Garissa
- Coordinates: 01°26′16″S 40°09′35″E
- Area: 533 km^{2} (206 sq mi)
- Established: 1974
- Governing body: Kenya Wildlife Service

The Arawale National Reserve is a designated conservation area managed by the Garissa County in assistance with the Kenya Wildlife Service. It lies in North Eastern Province of Kenya, 77 km (48 mi) south of the town of Garissa. The reserve covers an area of 53,324 hectares (533 km^{2}; 206 sq mi). To the west, it is bordered by the Tana River and, to the east, by the Garissa-Lamu road. In 1974, the reserve was gazetted as the only in-situ conservation site for the critically endangered Hirola population endemic to north-eastern Kenya and south-west Somalia.

== Wildlife ==
The reserve is a critical refuge for a range of wildlife species including four globally threatened species: hirola, Grevy's zebra, East African wild dog and East African cheetah. A study commissioned by Terra Nuova in 2006 also showed signs of presence of the African bush elephant.

Since 2005, the protected area is considered a Lion Conservation Unit together with Lag Badana National Park.
