= List of the Paleozoic life of Virginia =

This list of the Paleozoic life of Virginia contains the various prehistoric life-forms whose fossilized remains have been reported from within the US state of Virginia and are between 538.8 and 252.17 million years of age.

== A ==
- †Acanthocrania
- †Acanthoparypha – type locality for genus
  - †Acanthoparypha chiropyga – type locality for species
  - †Acanthoparypha perforata – type locality for species
- †Acmarhachis
  - †Acmarhachis acuta
- †Adiantities
  - †Adiantities spectabilis
- †Aechimina
- †Agassizocrinus
  - †Agassizocrinus ovalis – or unidentified comparable form
- †Allorisma
- †Ambocoelia
  - †Ambocoelia umbonata
- †Ambonychia
  - †Ambonychia bowmani
- †Amecephalina
  - †Amecephalina poulseni
- †Amphigenia
  - †Amphigenia curta
- †Amphilichas
  - †Amphilichas minganensis
- †Amplexograptus
  - †Amplexograptus confertus
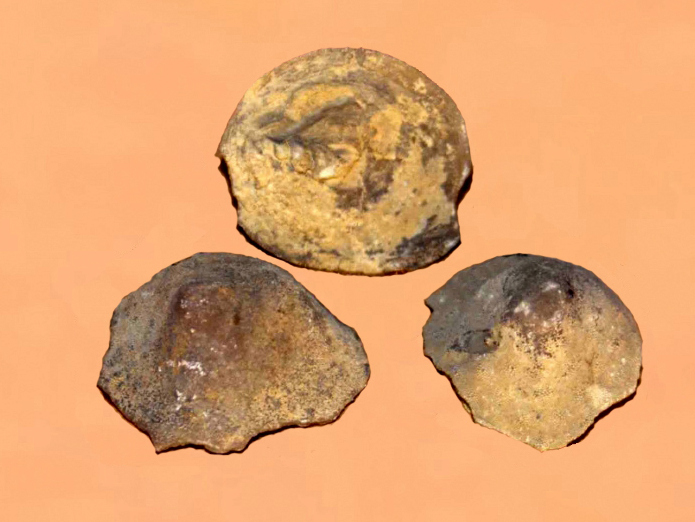
- Fossils of the Ordovician-Permian bryozoan Amplexopora
  †Amplexopora
- †Ampyx
  - †Ampyx virginiensis
- †Ampyxina
  - †Ampyxina lanceola – type locality for species
  - †Ampyxina powelli
- †Anazyga
  - †Anazyga recurvirostra
- †Ancanthoparypha
- †Anguloceras – type locality for genus
  - †Anguloceras depressum – type locality for species
  - †Anguloceras ovatum – type locality for species
  - †Anguloceras rotundum – type locality for species
- †Anolotichia
  - †Anolotichia explanata – or unidentified comparable form
- †Anoplia
  - †Anoplia nucleata
- †Anoplotheca
  - †Anoplotheca sulcata
- †Antagmus
- †Anthracospirifer
  - †Anthracospirifer leidyi
- †Aphelaspis
  - †Aphelaspis quadrata – tentative report
- †Apianurus
  - †Apianurus barbatus – type locality for species
  - †Apianurus glaber – type locality for species
- †Archaeocyathus
  - †Archaeocyathus resseri
- †Archaeosycon
  - †Archaeosycon balsami – type locality for species
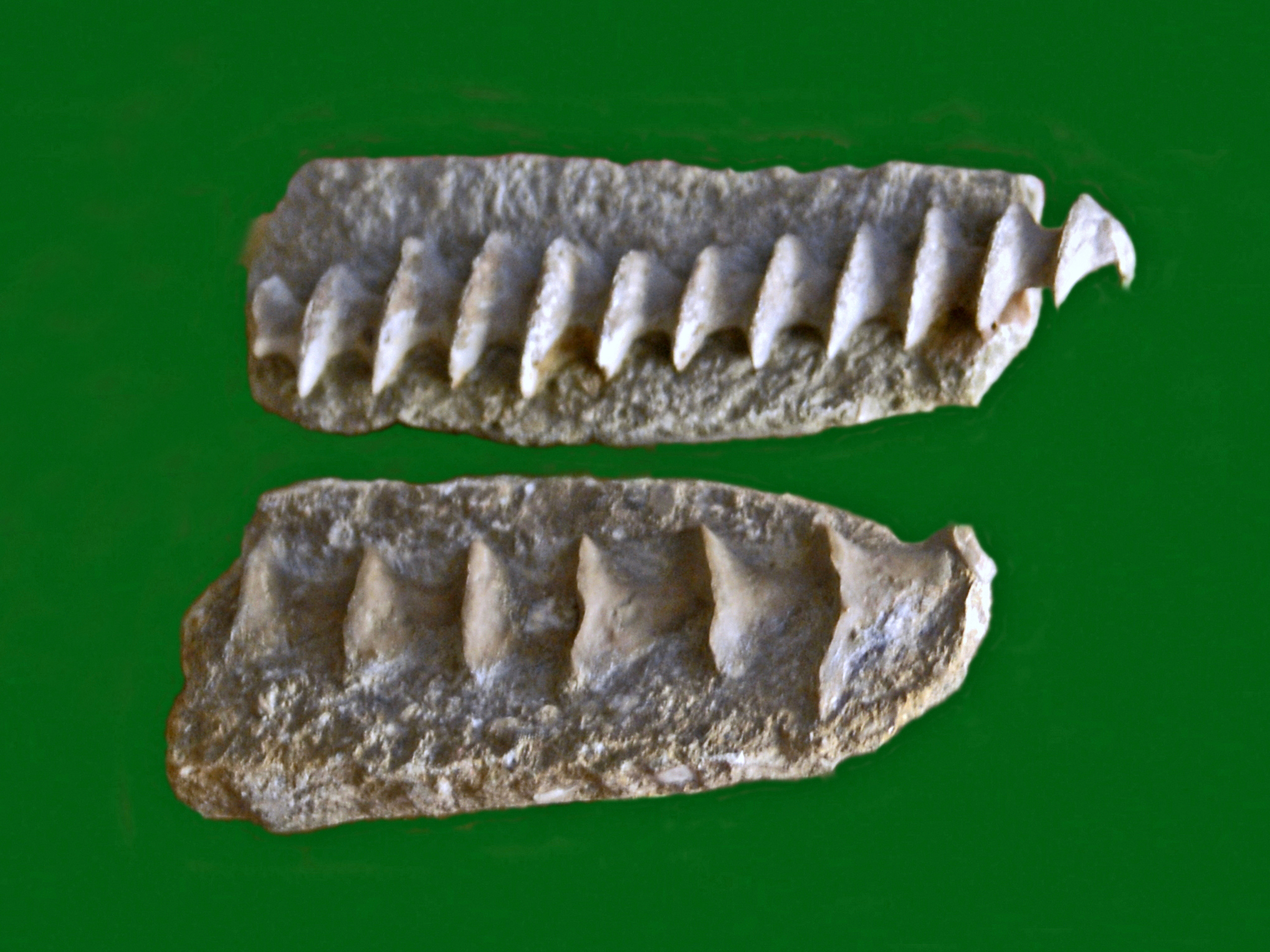
- Fossils of the Carboniferous-Permian bryozoan Archimedes
  †Archimedes
- †Arthrorhachis
- †Athyris
  - †Athyris angelica
  - †Athyris lamellosa
- †Atlanticocoelia
  - †Atlanticocoelia acutiplicata
- †Atrypa
  - †Atrypa reticularis
- †Aulopora
- †Aviculopecten
  - †Aviculopecten monroensis

== B ==
- †Bassleroceras
  - †Bassleroceras bridgei
  - †Bassleroceras dalevillense
- †Bathyholcus
  - †Bathyholcus gaspensis
- †Bathyurus
- †Batostoma
  - †Batostoma campensis
  - †Batostoma sevieri
  - †Batostoma suberassum – or unidentified comparable form
- †Batostomella
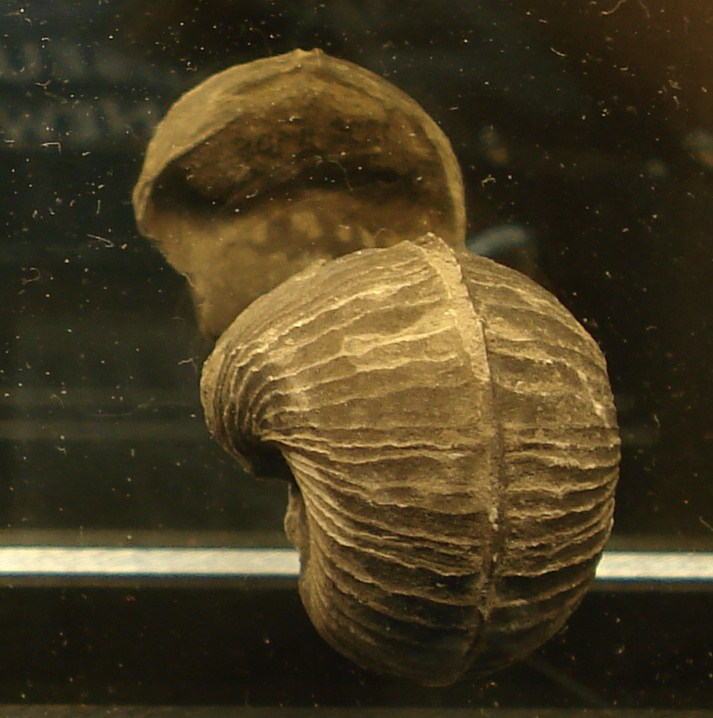
- Fossilized shell of the Silurian-Early Triassic mollusc Bellerophon
  †Bellerophon
  - †Bellerophon scissile – or unidentified comparable form
  - †Bellerophon spergensis – tentative report
- †Bellimurina
  - †Bellimurina charlottae
- †Berounella
- †Billingsaria
  - †Billingsaria parva
- †Bilobia
- †Bimuria
  - †Bimuria immatura – type locality for species
  - †Bimuria lamellosa
  - †Bimuria superba
- †Blountia
  - †Blountia virginica
- †Blountiella
  - †Blountiella buttsi – tentative report
- †Bollia – tentative report
  - †Bollia diceratina
- †Bonnemaia
- †Bonnia
  - †Bonnia crassa
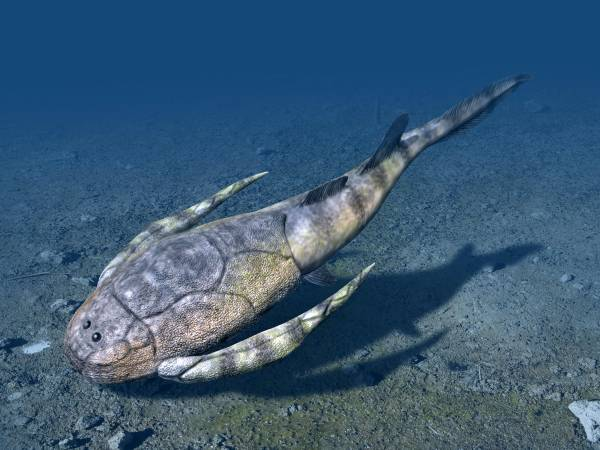
- Life restoration of the Late Devonian placoderm fish Bothriolepis
  †Bothriolepis
  - †Bothriolepis virginiensis – type locality for species
- †Brachyprion
- †Bronteopsis
- †Bucanella
  - †Bucanella nana – or unidentified comparable form
- †Bucania
- †Bumastoides
- †Bumastus
  - †Bumastus lioderma – or unidentified comparable form
- †Buthotrephis
  - †Buthotrephis flexuosa – or unidentified comparable form
  - †Buthotrephis gracilis
  - †Buthotrephis inosculata
- †Byssonychia
  - †Byssonychia praecursa
- †Bythopora

== C ==
- †Caborcella
- †Calipernurus
  - †Calipernurus insolitus – type locality for species
- †Callixylon
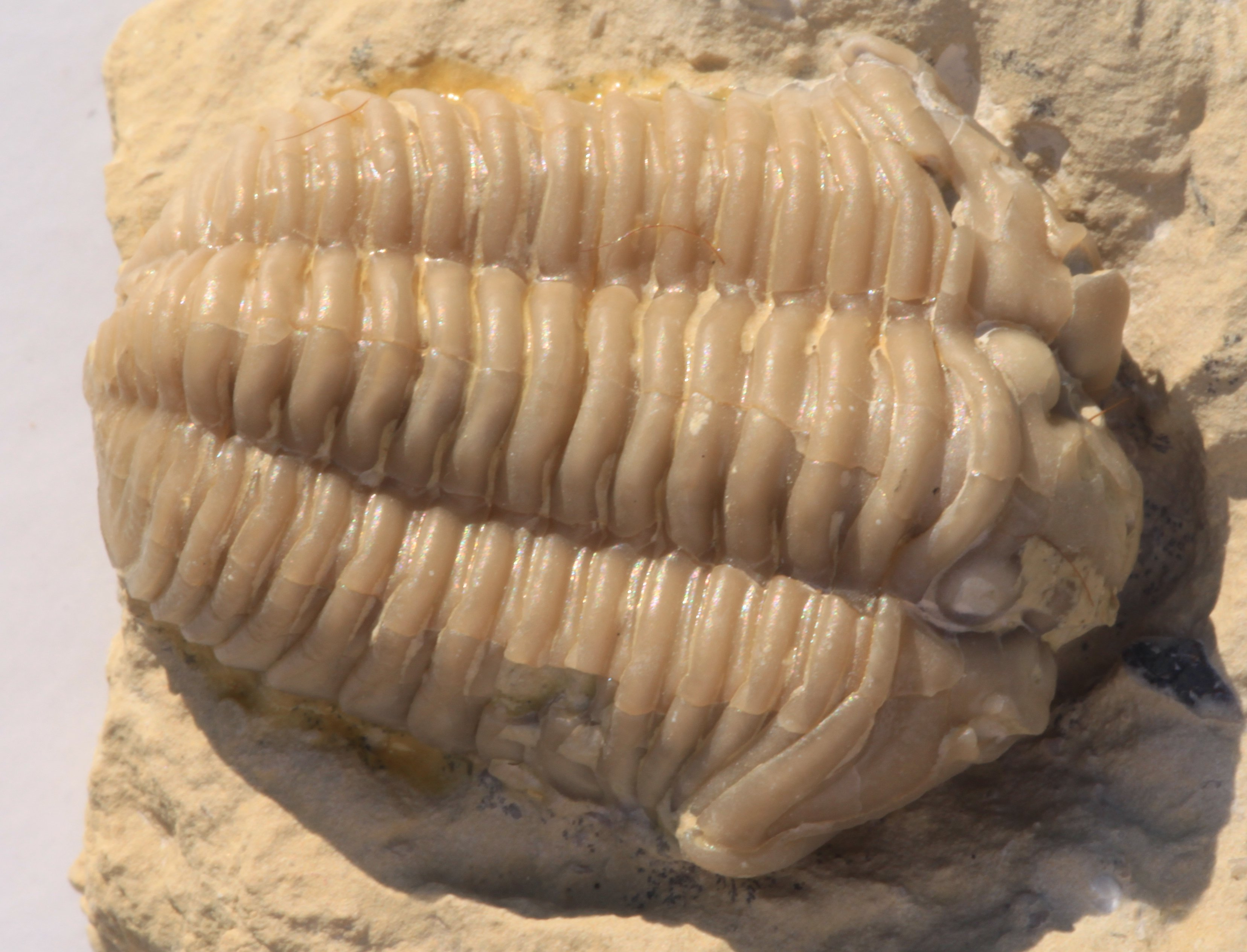
- Fossil of the Early Ordovician-Early Devonian trilobite Calymene
  †Calymene
- †Calyptaulax
  - †Calyptaulax annulata
  - †Calyptaulax annulatus
  - †Calyptaulax callicephala
  - †Calyptaulax callirachis – type locality for species
  - †Calyptaulax confluens
  - †Calyptaulax gracilens – or unidentified comparable form
- †Camarocladia
  - †Camarocladia gracilis
- †Camarotoechia
  - †Camarotoechia contracta
  - †Camarotoechia quadriplicata
  - †Camarotoechia varians – or unidentified comparable form
- †Camerella
  - †Camerella varians
- †Campbelloceras
  - †Campbelloceras brevicameratum
  - †Campbelloceras virginianus
- †Canarekka
  - †Canarekka varians – or unidentified comparable form
- †Caneyella
- †Carabocrinus
- †Cardiopteris
  - †Cardiopteris abbensis – type locality for species
  - †Cardiopteris irregularis – type locality for species
- †Carickia
- †Cariniferella
- †Carniferella
  - †Carniferella carinata
- †Caryocystites
- †Cavifera
  - †Cavifera concinna – or unidentified comparable form
- †Centrotarphyceras
  - †Centrotarphyceras bridgei
  - †Centrotarphyceras macdonaldi
- †Ceramoporella
- †Ceratocephala
  - †Ceratocephala laciniata – type locality for species
  - †Ceratocephala rarispina – type locality for species
  - †Ceratocephala triacantheis – type locality for species
  - †Ceratocephala tridens
- †Ceratopea – type locality for genus
  - †Ceratopea grandis
  - †Ceratopea keithi – type locality for species
- †Ceratopsis
  - †Ceratopsis chambersi
- †Ceraurinella – type locality for genus
  - †Ceraurinella chondra – type locality for species
  - †Ceraurinella typa – type locality for species
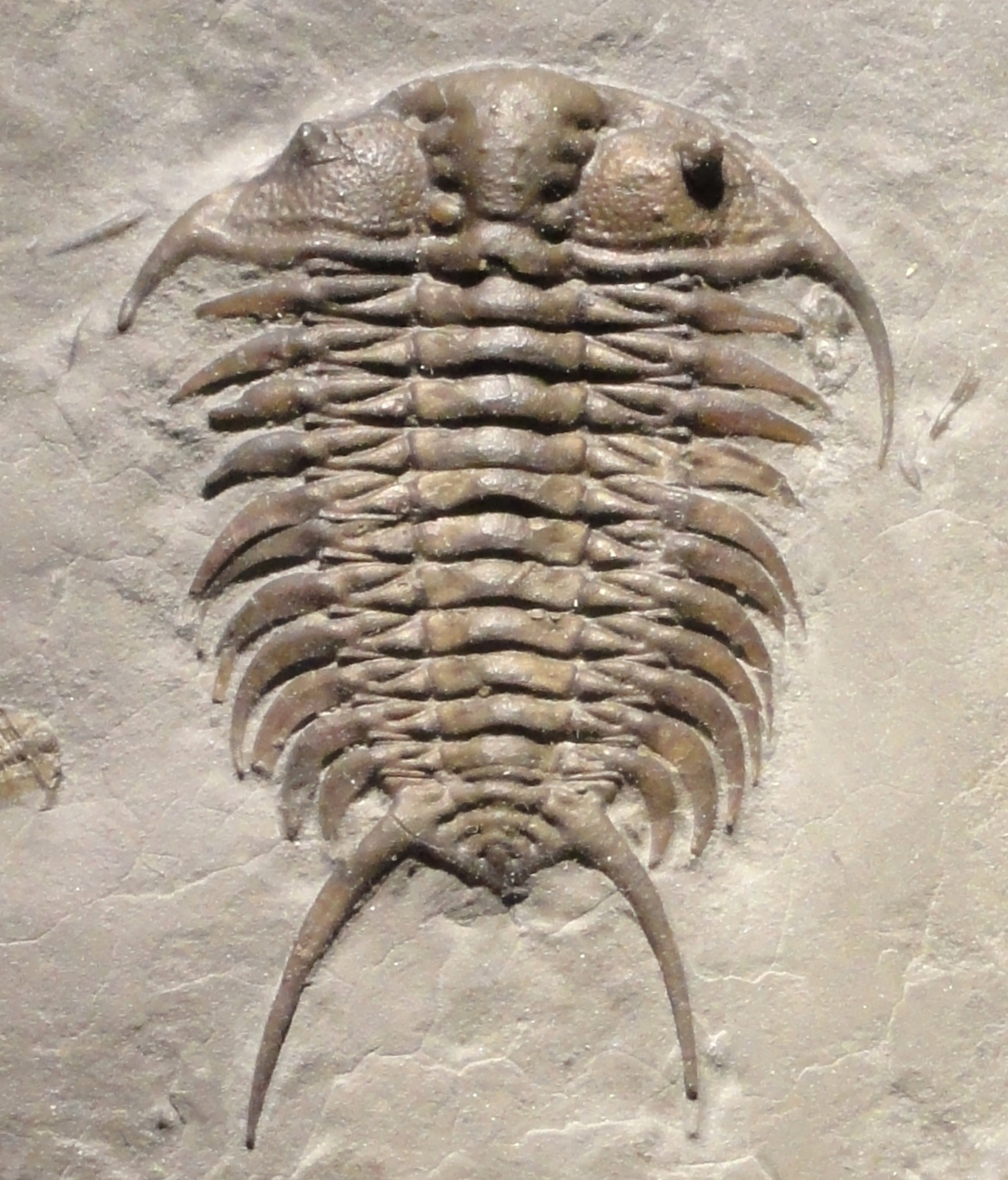
- Fossil of the Middle-Late Ordovician trilobite Ceraurus
  †Ceraurus
  - †Ceraurus whittingtoni
- †Charionella
  - †Charionella scitula
- †Chasmatopora
- †Chasmotopora
- †Chazydictya – tentative report
- †Cheilocephalus
- †Cheirocrinus
  - †Cheirocrinus angulatus – tentative report
- †Chepuloceras – type locality for genus
  - †Chepuloceras inelegans – type locality for species
- †Chlidanophyton
  - †Chlidanophyton dublinensis
- †Chomatopyge
  - †Chomatopyge falcata – type locality for species
  - †Chomatopyge marginifera – type locality for species
- †Chonetes
  - †Chonetes chesterensis
  - †Chonetes mucronatus
  - †Chonetes novascoticus
  - †Chonetes shumardonus
- †Christiania
  - †Christiania subquadrata
  - †Christiania trentonensis
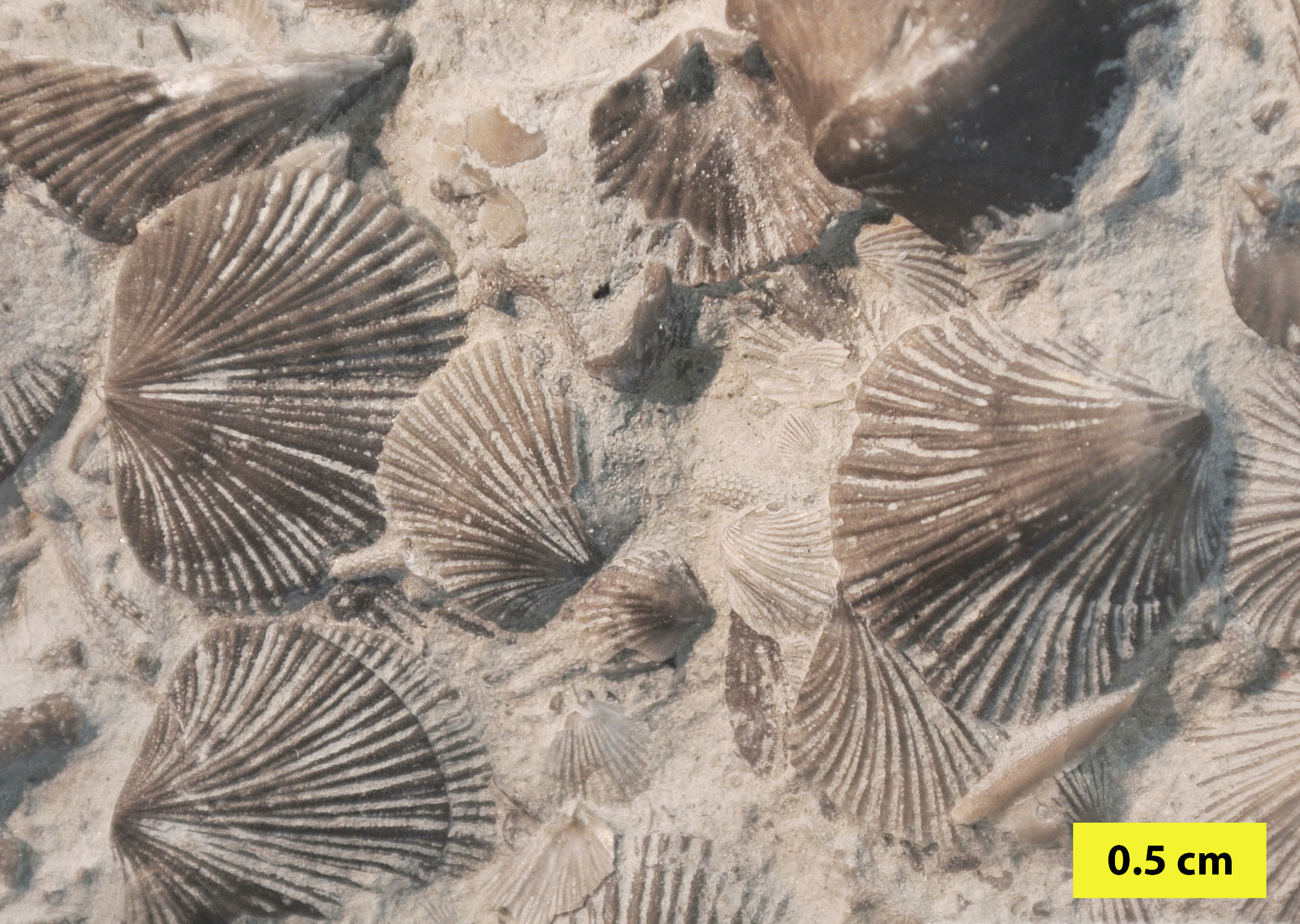
- Assemblage of fossilized shells of the Ordovician brachiopod Cincinnetina
  †Cincinnetina
  - †Cincinnetina meeki
  - †Cincinnetina multisecta
- †Cladopora
- †Clarkoceras – tentative report
- †Cleiocrinus
  - †Cleiocrinus tessellatus – or unidentified comparable form
- †Cleiothyridina
  - †Cleiothyridina sublamellosa – or unidentified comparable form
- †Cleirocrinus
  - †Cleirocrinus tessellatus – or unidentified comparable form
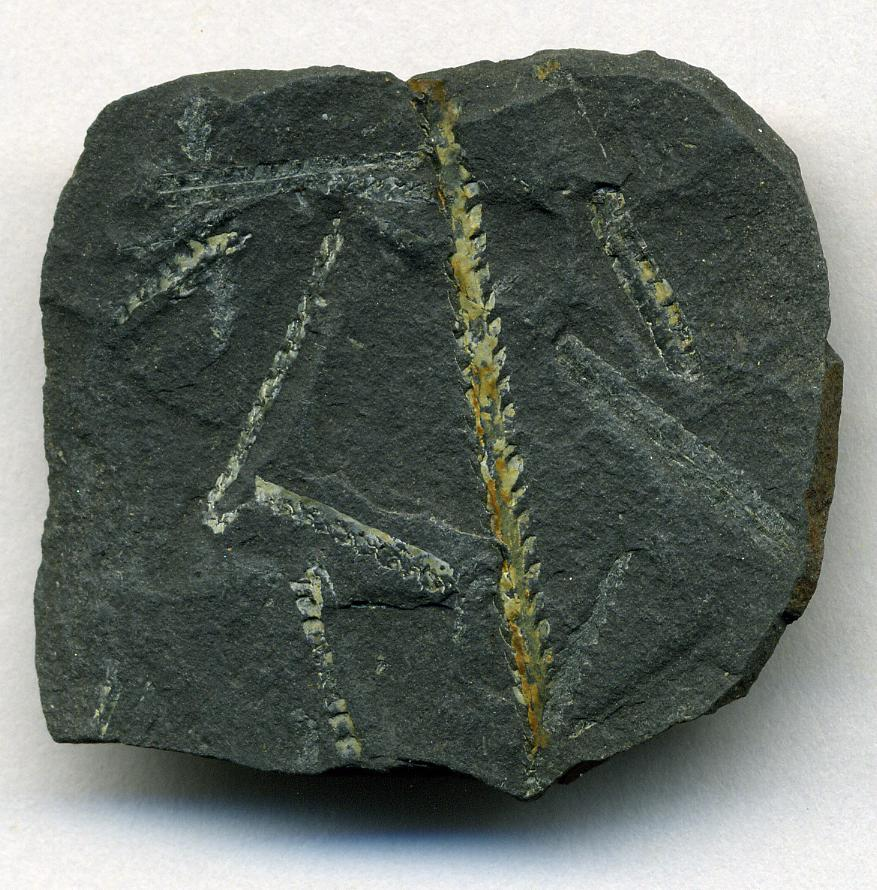
- Assemblage of fossils of the Cambrian graptolite Climacograptus
  †Climacograptus
  - †Climacograptus scharenbergi
- †Cliothyridina
  - †Cliothyridina sublamellosa
- †Coeloclema – tentative report
- †Coelospira
  - †Coelospira hemisphaerica
  - †Coelospira nitens
  - †Coelospira planoconvexa
- †Coleoloides
- †Colpomya
  - †Colpomya faba
- †Columbocystis
  - †Columbocystis typica
- †Columnaria
  - †Columnaria halli
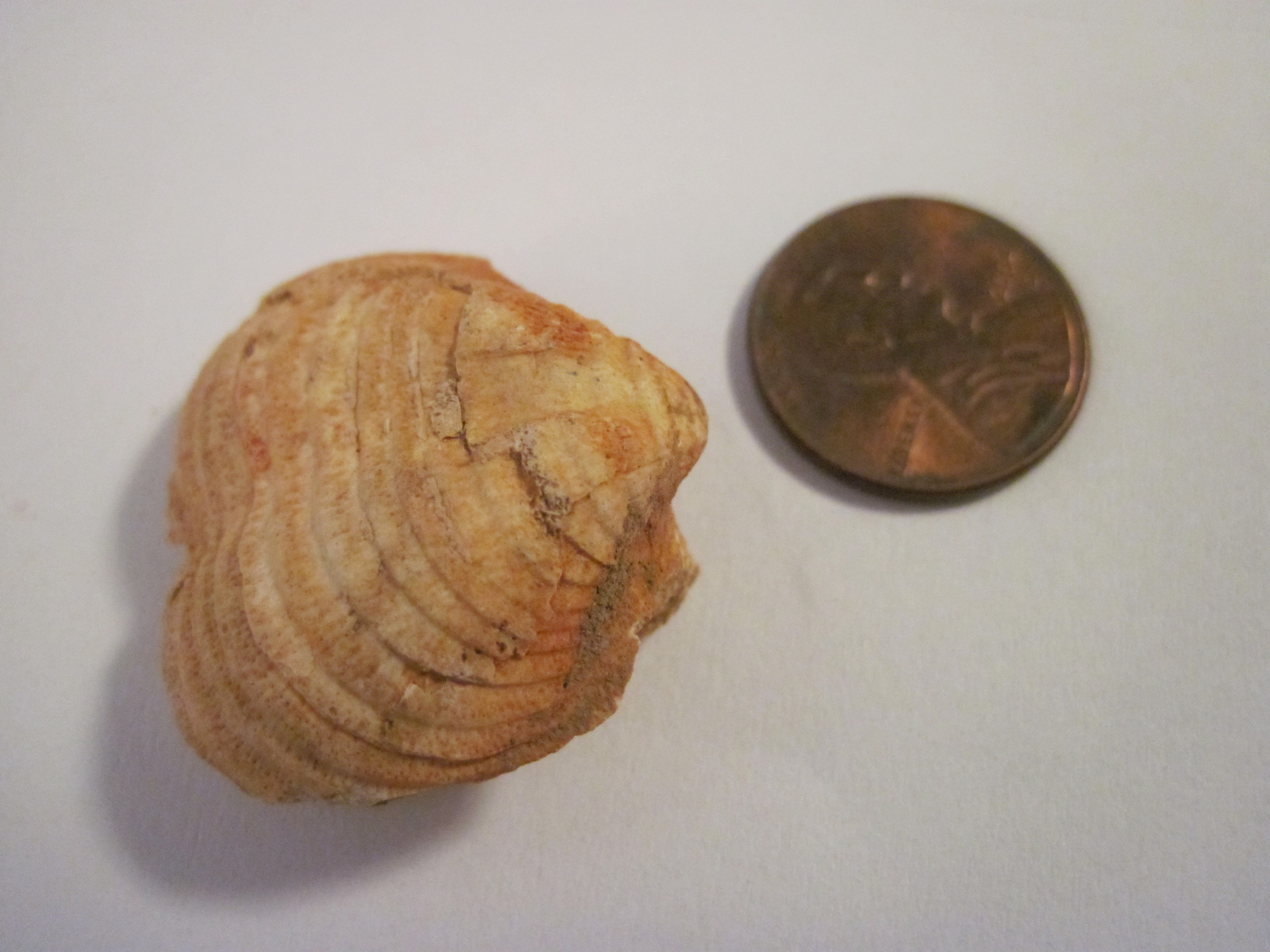
- Fossilized shell of the Late Devonian-Permian brachiopod Composita
  †Composita
  - †Composita subquadrata – or unidentified comparable form
- †Conocardium
- †Conocerina
- †Conotreta
  - †Conotreta cuspidata
  - †Conotreta plana
- †Constellaria
- †Constellirostra
- †Conularia
- †Coosia
  - †Coosia alethes
  - †Coosia calanus
- †Coosina
  - †Coosina ariston
- †Corineorthis
- †Cornellites
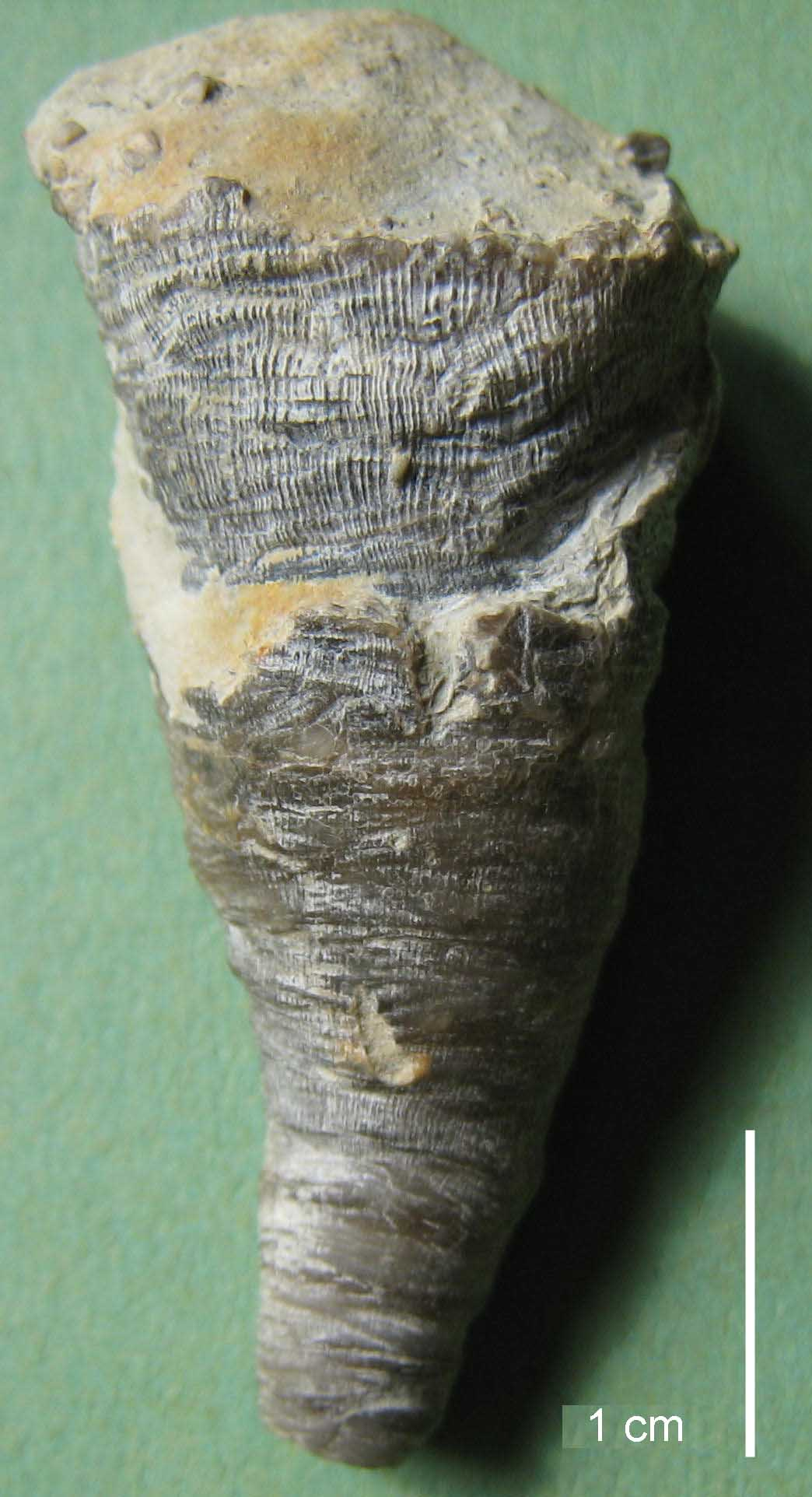
- Fossil of the Middle Ordovician-Carboniferous horn coral Cornulites
  †Cornulites
  - †Cornulites flexuosus – or unidentified comparable form
- †Craniops
- †Crepicephalus
  - †Crepicephalus rectus
- †Crossia
  - †Crossia virginiana
- †Cryptolithus
  - †Cryptolithus tesselatus
- †Cryptophragmus
  - †Cryptophragmus antiquatus
- †Ctenodonta
  - †Ctenodonta pulchella
- †Ctenoloculina
- †Cuneamya
  - †Cuneamya scapha
  - †Cuneamya umbonata
- †Cupularostrum
  - †Cupularostrum congregata
  - †Cupularostrum contracta
- †Cybeloides
  - †Cybeloides virginiensis
- †Cyclospira
- †Cymatonota
  - †Cymatonota pholadis – or unidentified comparable form
- †Cypricarculana – tentative report
- †Cypricardella
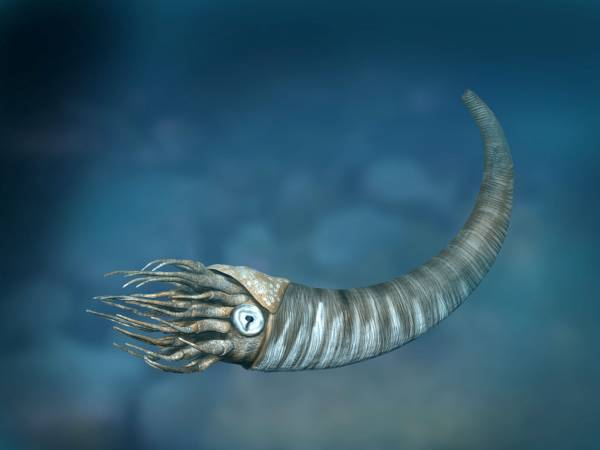
- Restoration of the Cambrian-Middle Devonian nautiloid cephalopod Cyrtoceras
  †Cyrtoceras
- †Cyrtodonta
- †Cyrtodontula
  - †Cyrtodontula massanuttenensis
  - †Cyrtodontula nasuta
- †Cyrtonella
- †Cyrtonotella
  - †Cyrtonotella grandistriata
- †Cyrtospirifer
  - †Cyrtospirifer disjunctus
- †Cystelasma
  - †Cystelasma quinquiseptatum
- †Cystiphylloides
- †Cystiphyllum
- †Cystodictya
  - †Cystodictya lineata
  - †Cystodictya ovatipora

== D ==
- †Dactylogonia
  - †Dactylogonia palustris – or unidentified related form
- †Dakeoceras
- †Dalmanella
  - †Dalmanella bassleri
  - †Dalmanella costellata
  - †Dalmanella fertilis
  - †Dalmanella rogata
  - †Dalmanella sculpta – or unidentified comparable form
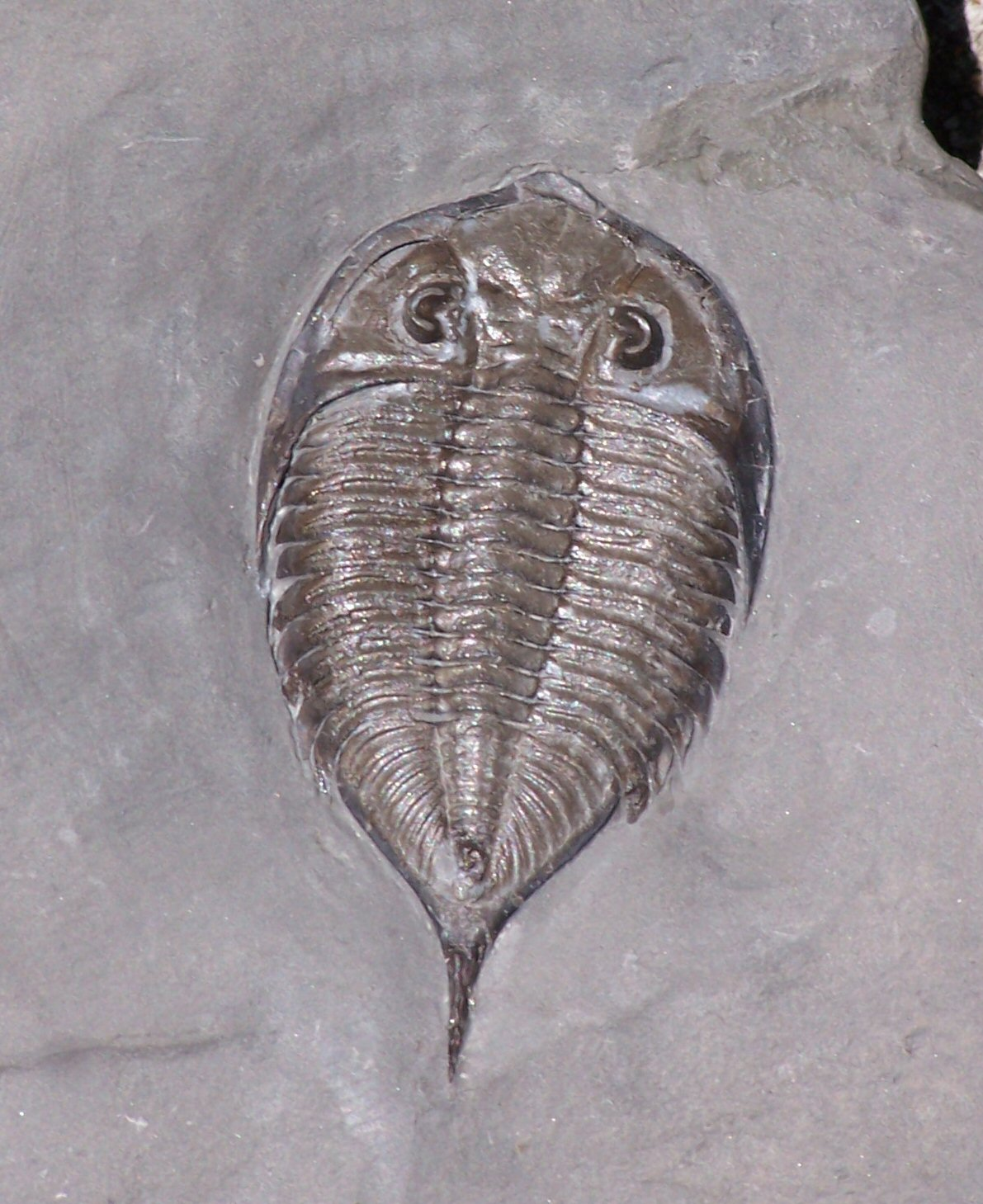
- Fossil of the Late Ordovician-Middle Devonian trilobite Dalmanites
  †Dalmanites – or unidentified comparable form
- †Decoroproetus
- †Dekayia
- †Delocrinus
- †Densastroma
  - †Densastroma pexisum
- †Dermatostroma
- †Devonochonetes
  - †Devonochonetes scitulus – or unidentified comparable form
- †Diabolocrinus
- †Diacanthaspis
  - †Diacanthaspis cooperi – type locality for species
  - †Diacanthaspis lepidus – type locality for species
  - †Diacanthaspis orandensis – type locality for species
  - †Diacanthaspis scitulus – type locality for species
  - †Diacanthaspis secretus – type locality for species
  - †Diacanthaspis ulrichi – type locality for species
- †Diaphragmus
- †Dicellograptus
- †Dicellomus
  - †Dicellomus appalachia
- †Dichotrypa
  - †Dichotrypa flabellum – tentative report
- †Dictyoclostus
  - †Dictyoclostus burlingtonensis
  - †Dictyoclostus inflatus
  - †Dictyoclostus parvus
  - †Dictyoclostus scitulus
- †Dielasma
  - †Dielasma arkansanum – or unidentified comparable form
- †Dimeropyge
  - †Dimeropyge spinifera – type locality for species
  - †Dimeropyge virginiensis – type locality for species
- †Dinorthis
  - †Dinorthis atavoides
  - †Dinorthis interstriata
  - †Dinorthis transversa
  - †Dinorthis willardi
- †Dionide
  - †Dionide holdeni
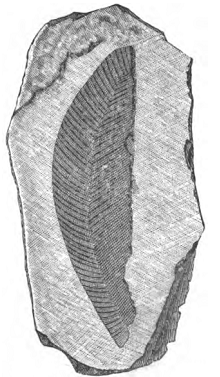
- Cambrian graptolite Diplograptus
  †Diplograptus
  - †Diplograptus foliaceus
  - †Diplograptus vespertinus – or unidentified comparable form
- †Dizygopleura
- †Doleroides
  - †Doleroides ponderosus – type locality for species
- †Dolichoharpes
  - †Dolichoharpes reticulata
- †Donaldina
- †Douvillina
- †Drabia
  - †Drabia curtoccipita
- †Drepanella
  - †Drepanella richardsoni
- †Dromopus
  - †Dromopus aduncus
- †Dunderbergia
  - †Dunderbergia simplex
  - †Dunderbergia variagranula – or unidentified comparable form
- †Dystactispongia
- †Dystactospongia
  - †Dystactospongia minor

== E ==
- †Ecculiomphalus
- †Eccyliopterus
- †Echinoconchus
  - †Echinoconchus elegans – or unidentified related form
- †Echinocrinus
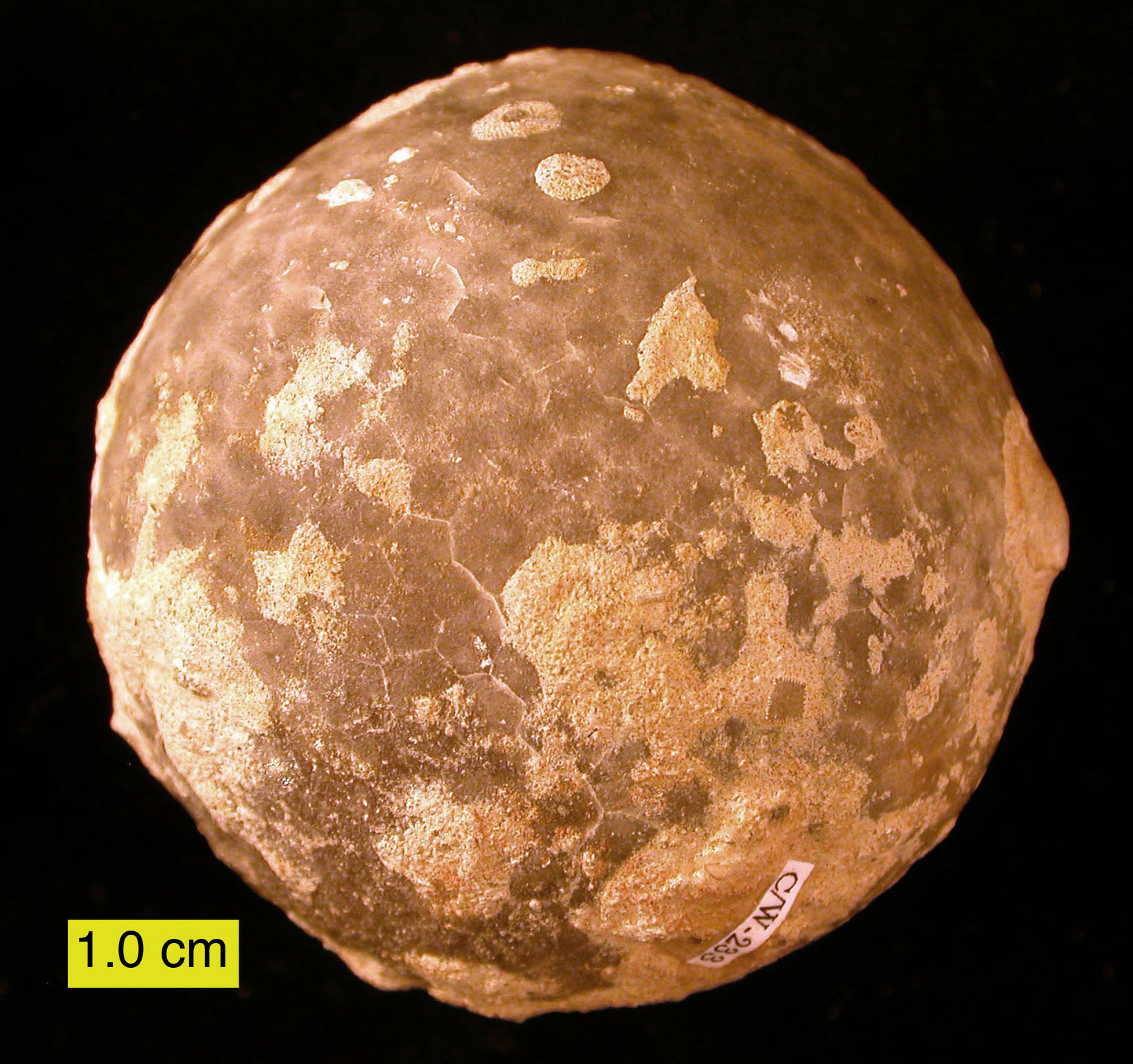
- Fossil of the Early-Middle Ordovician cystoid echinoderm Echinosphaerites
  †Echinosphaerites
  - †Echinosphaerites aurantium
- †Ectenoceras
  - †Ectenoceras chepultepecense
  - †Ectenoceras compressum
  - †Ectenoceras exile
  - †Ectenoceras longum
- †Edmondia – tentative report
- †Edmondia
- †Elliptoglossa
  - †Elliptoglossa ovalis
  - †Elliptoglossa rotundata
- †Embolophyllum
  - †Embolophyllum schucherti
- †Encrinuroides
- †Eodevonaria
  - †Eodevonaria arcuata
- †Eoharpes
- †Eomonorachus
- †Eophacops
- †Eoplectodonta
  - †Eoplectodonta alternata
- †Eopsongia
- †Eoptychoparia
  - †Eoptychoparia clearbranches
  - †Eoptychoparia taylori
- †Eospongia
  - †Eospongia roemeri
  - †Eospongia varians
- †Eotomaria
  - †Eotomaria canalifera
- †Epiphyton
- †Eridorthis
  - †Eridorthis inexpecta – type locality for species
- †Eridotrypa
- †Escharopora
  - †Escharopora subrecta
- †Esharopora
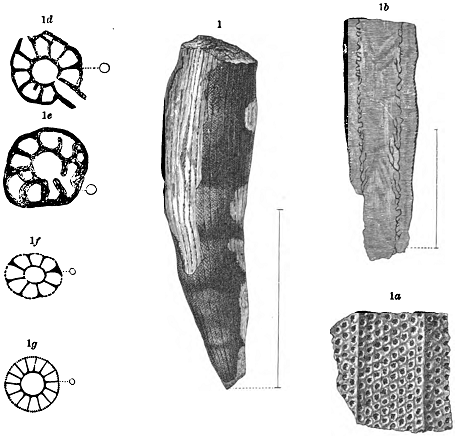
- Illustration with inset cross-section diagrams of the Cambrian sponge Ethmophyllum
  †Ethmophyllum
  - †Ethmophyllum whitneyi
- †Euchasma
  - †Euchasma blumenbachi
- †Euphemites
  - †Euphemites galericulatus
- †Eurychilina
  - †Eurychilina latimarginata – or unidentified comparable form
  - †Eurychilina subradiata
- †Eurystomites
  - †Eurystomites bolarensis
- †Eustephanella
  - †Eustephanella catastephanes

== F ==
- †Fardenia
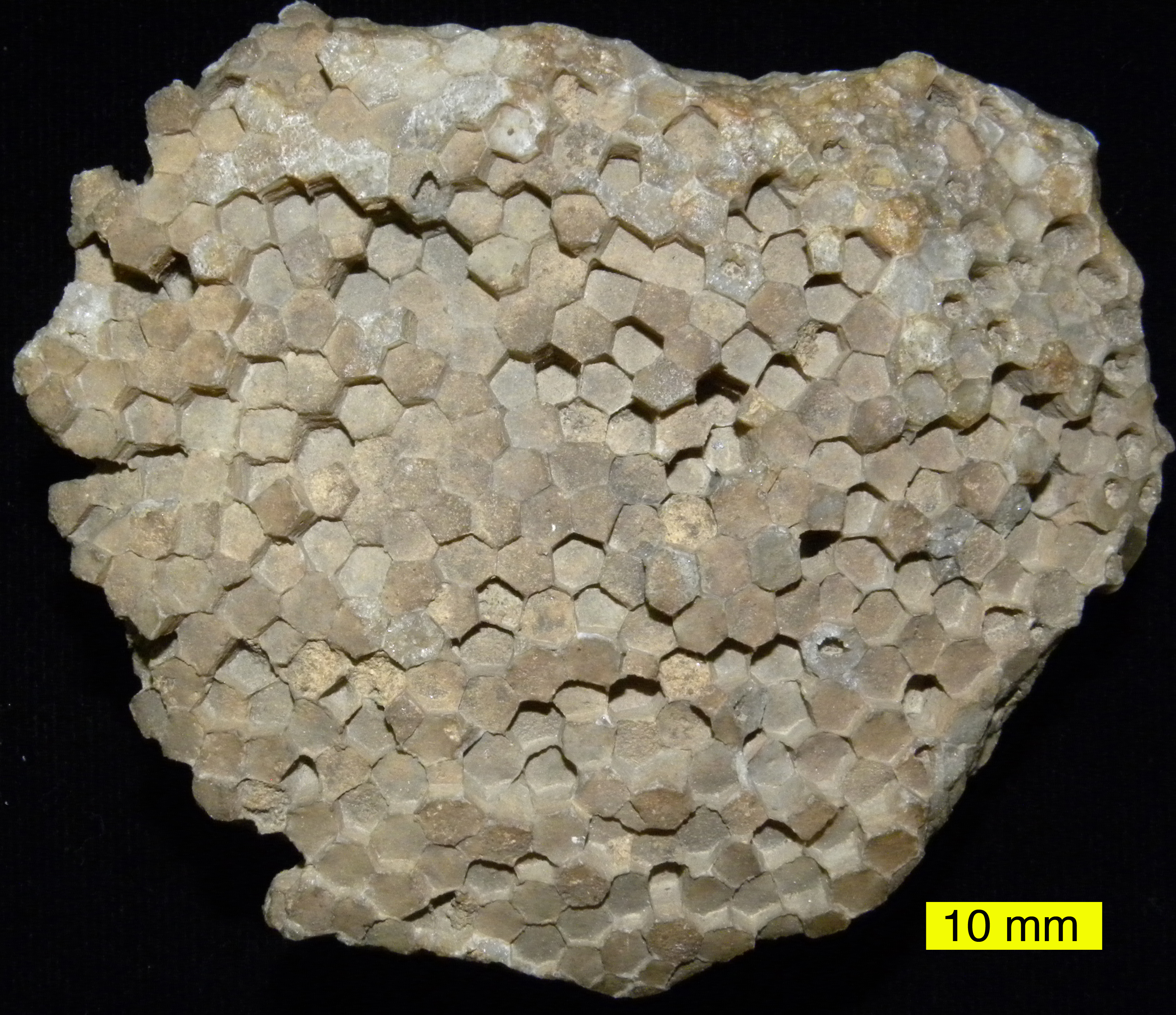
- Fossil of the Late Ordovician-Permian tabulate coral Favosites
  †Favosites
- †Fenestralia
  - †Fenestralia sanctiludovici
- †Fenestrellina
  - †Fenestrellina regalis – tentative report
  - †Fenestrellina serratula
  - †Fenestrellina tenax
- †Finkelnburgia
  - †Finkelnburgia buttsi
- †Fletcheria – tentative report
  - †Fletcheria incognita – or unidentified comparable form
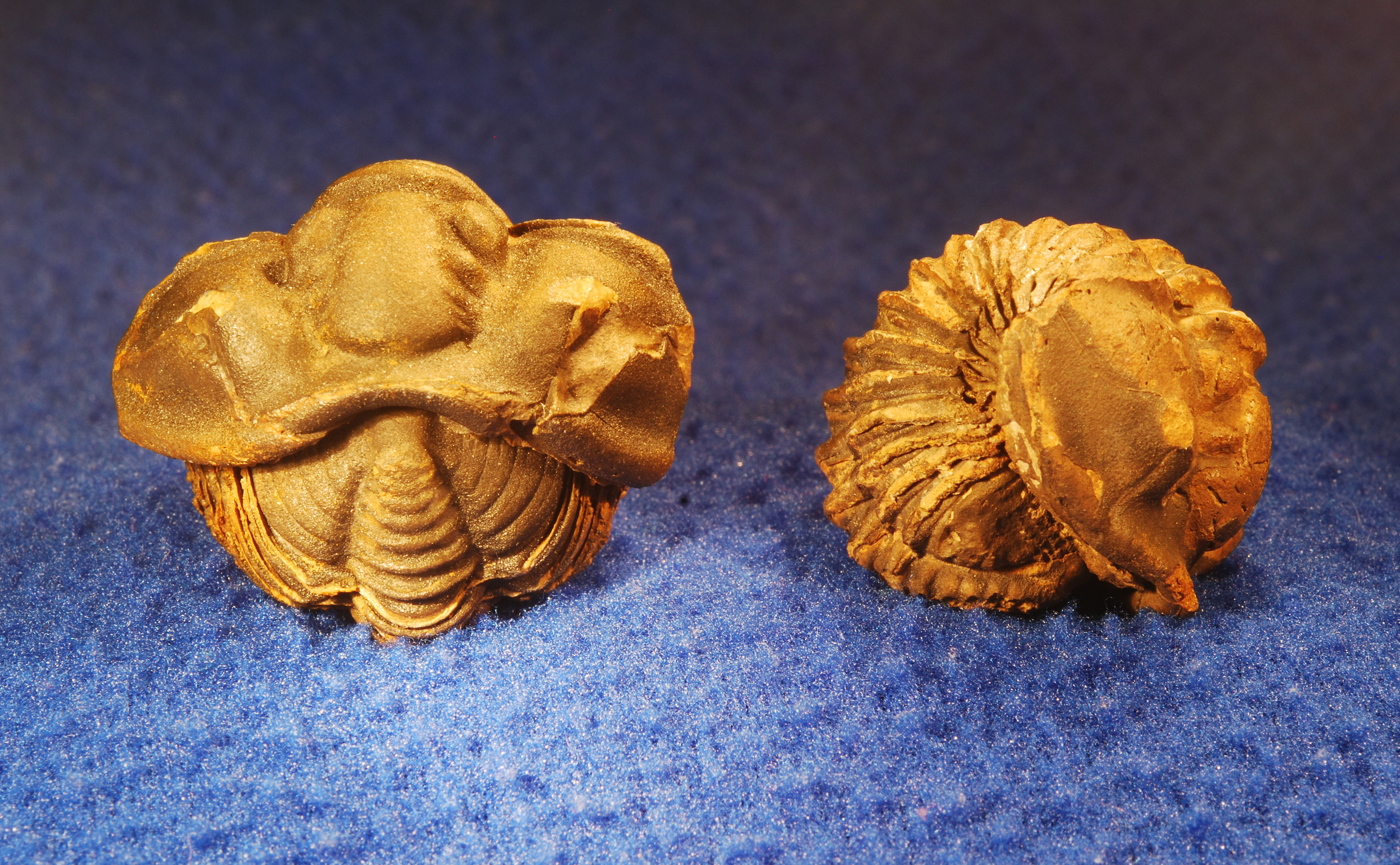
- Front (left) and right side (right) views of an enrolled fossil of the Middle Ordovician-Silurian trilobite Flexicalymene
  †Flexicalymene
  - †Flexicalymene senaria
- †Foerstia
  - †Foerstia ohioensis
- †Furcitella
  - †Furcitella plicata – type locality for species

== G ==
- †Gasconadia
  - †Gasconadia putilla
- †Genselia
- †Girtyella
  - †Girtyella indianensis
  - †Girtyella turgida
- †Girvanella
- †Glaphyraspis
  - †Glaphyraspis ovata
  - †Glaphyraspis parva
- †Glauconome
- †Glenodonta
- †Globocrinus
  - †Globocrinus unionensis – or unidentified comparable form
- †Glyptambonites
  - †Glyptambonites glyptus – type locality for species
  - †Glyptambonites musculosus
- †Glyptometopsis
  - †Glyptometopsis marginata
  - †Glyptometopsis tumida
- †Glyptopora
- †Glyptorthis
  - †Glyptorthis bellarugosa
  - †Glyptorthis bellatula – type locality for species
  - †Glyptorthis equiconvexa
  - †Glyptorthis glypta – type locality for species
  - †Glyptorthis senecta – type locality for species
  - †Glyptorthis uniformis – type locality for species
- †Gnetopsis
  - †Gnetopsis hispida
- †Gonioceras
- †Grammysia
- †Graphiadactyllis
- †Graptodictya
- †Grenevievella – or unidentified comparable form
- †Grivanella

== H ==
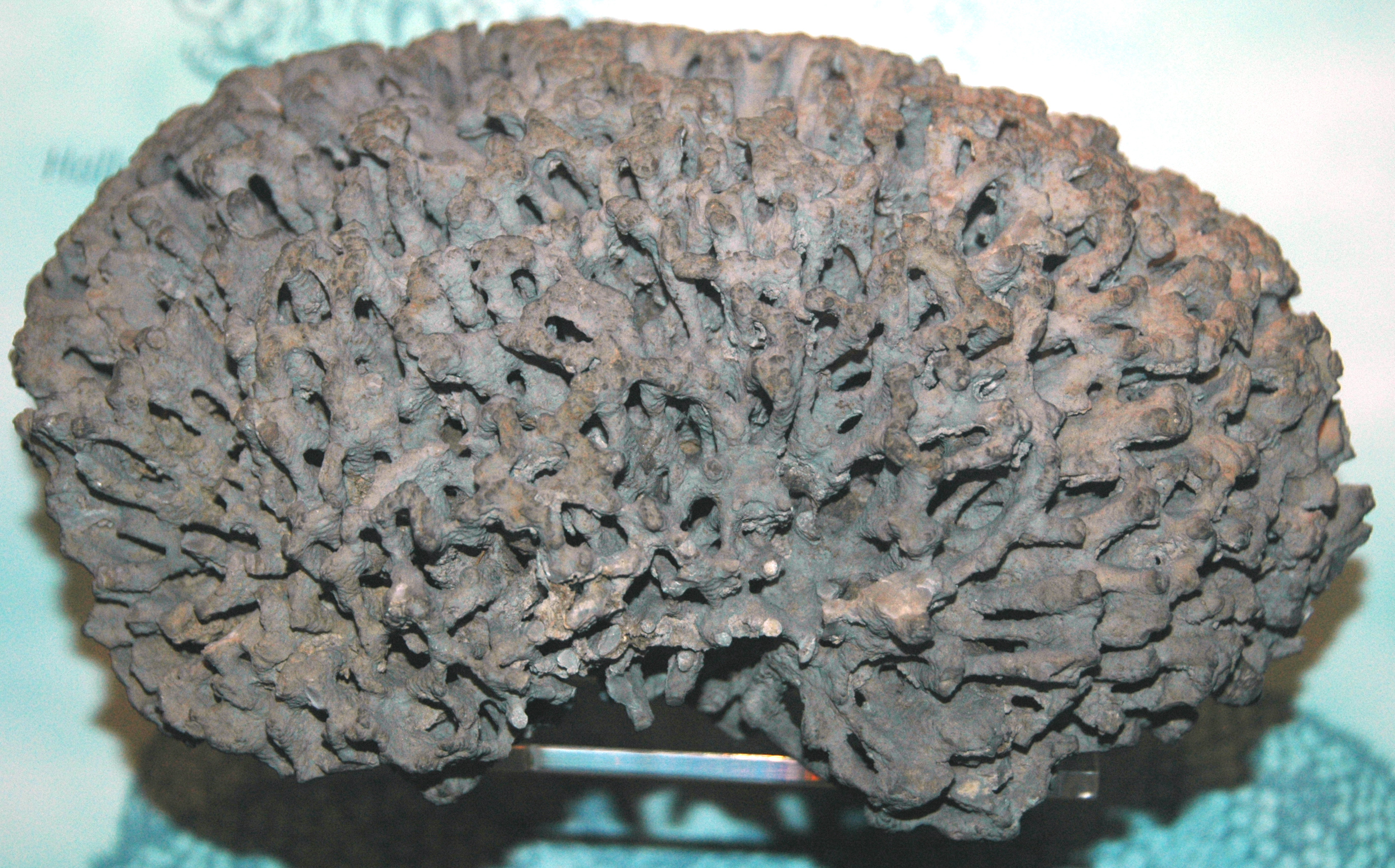
- Fossil of the Ordovician bryozoan ("moss animal") Hallopora
  †Hallopora
  - †Hallopora multitabulata
- †Harpidella
- †Healdia
- †Hebertella
  - †Hebertella frankfortensis
  - †Hebertella sinuata
- †Helcionella
- †Helicotoma
  - †Helicotoma declivis
  - †Helicotoma granosa – or unidentified comparable form
  - †Helicotoma tennesseensis
  - †Helicotoma verticalis – or unidentified comparable form
- †Heliomeroides
  - †Heliomeroides teres – type locality for species
- †Hellopora
- †Hemiphragma
- †Hemithecella – type locality for genus
  - †Hemithecella expansa – type locality for species
- †Hemitrypa
  - †Hemitrypa proutana
- †Hesperorthis
  - †Hesperorthis tricenaria – or unidentified comparable form
- †Heterotrypa
- †Holdenia
  - †Holdenia typa
- †Holia
  - †Holia cimelia – type locality for species
  - †Holia secristi – type locality for species
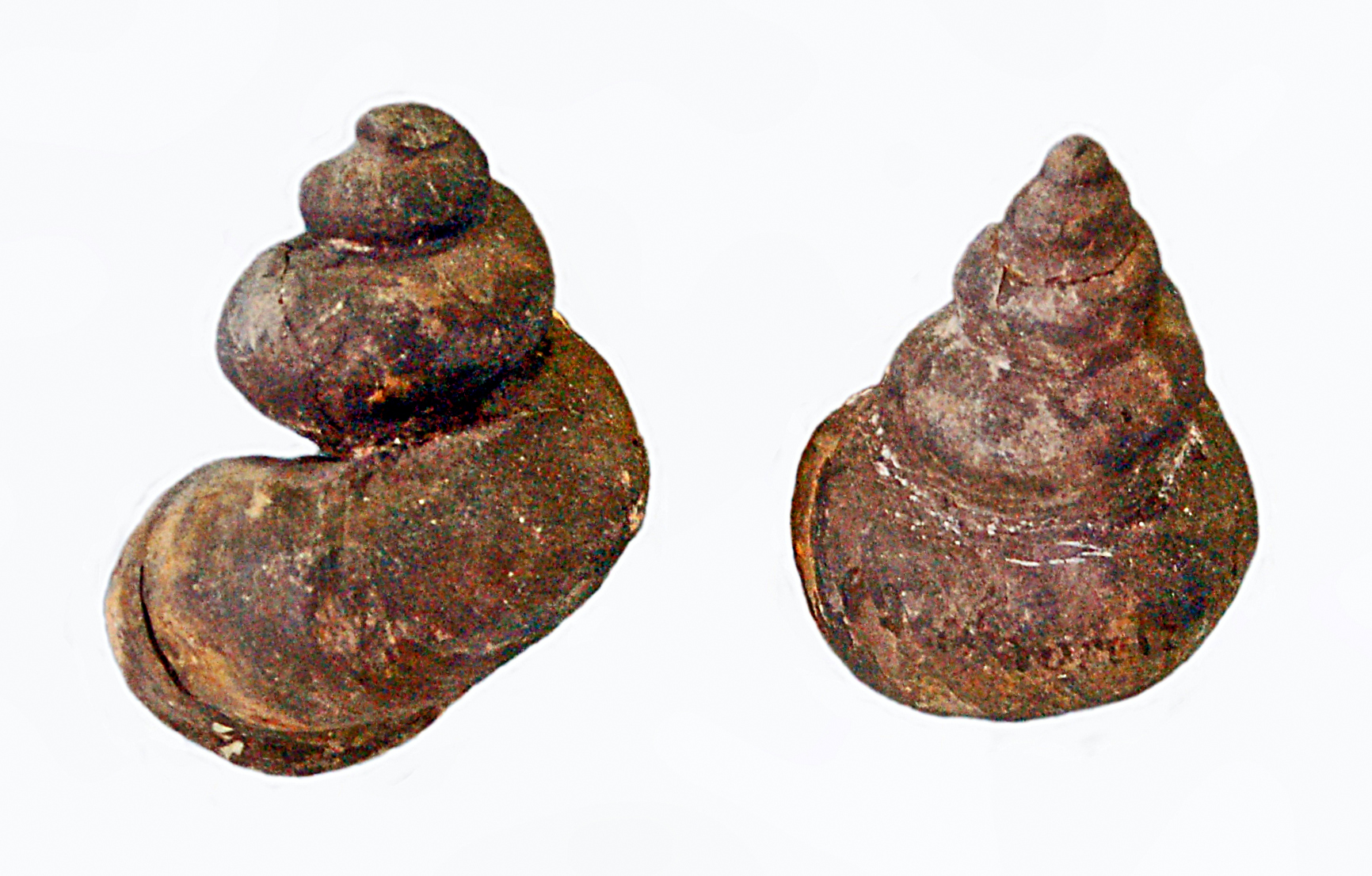
- Fossilized shells of the Ordovician-Carboniferous sea snail Holopea
  †Holopea
  - †Holopea scrutator
- †Homagnostus
- †Homotelus
  - †Homotelus elongatus
  - †Homotelus simplex – or unidentified comparable form
- †Hormotoma
- †Howellella
- †Hustedograptus
  - †Hustedograptus teretiusculus – or unidentified comparable form
- †Hyboaspis
- †Hyolithellus
  - †Hyolithellus micans
  - †Hyolithellus micras

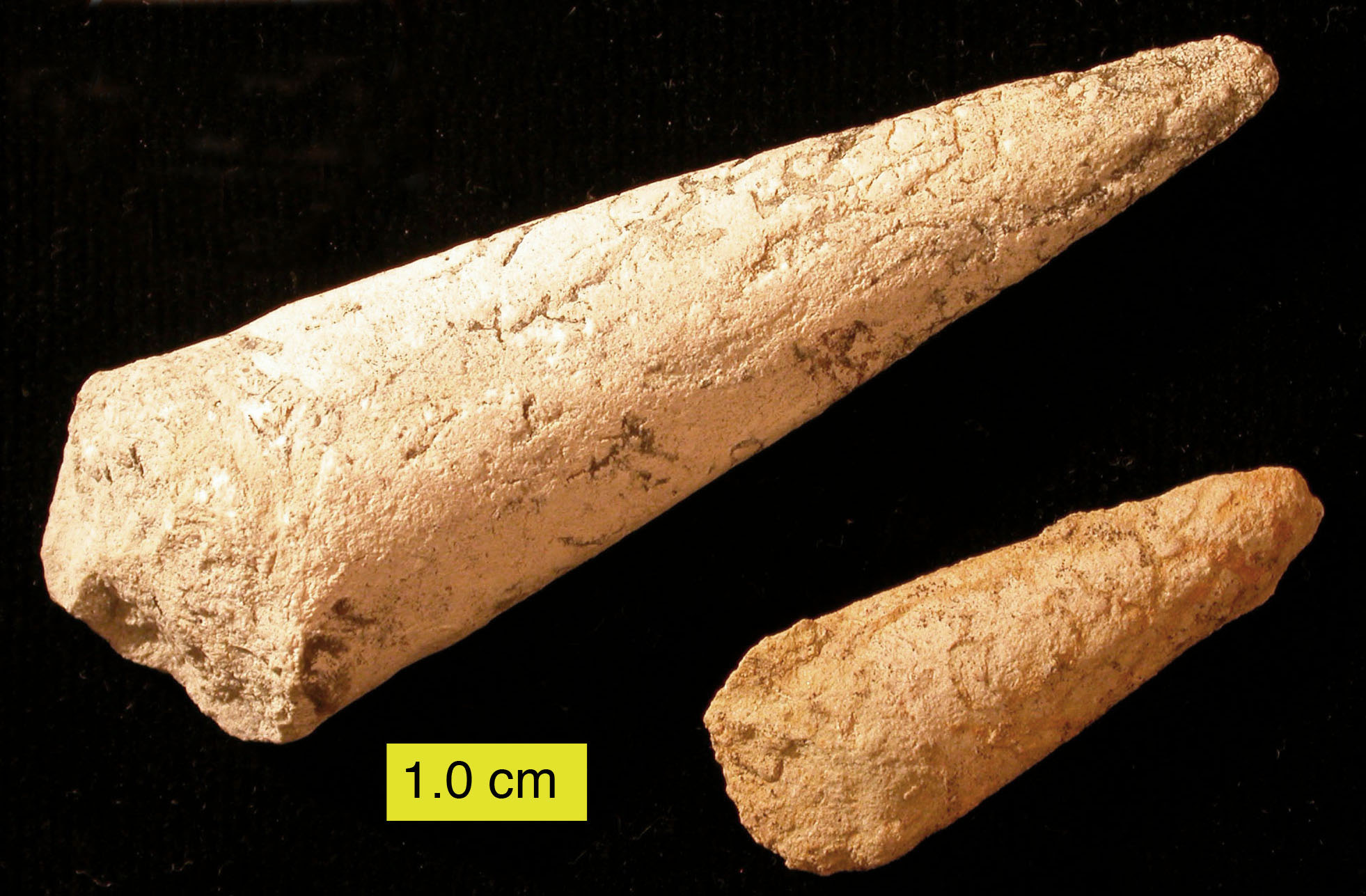
Fossilized shells of the Cambrian-Permian brachiopod relative Hyolitha

†Hyolithes

- †Hypseloconus
  - †Hypseloconus bessemerense – or unidentified comparable form
- †Hystricurus – tentative report

== I ==
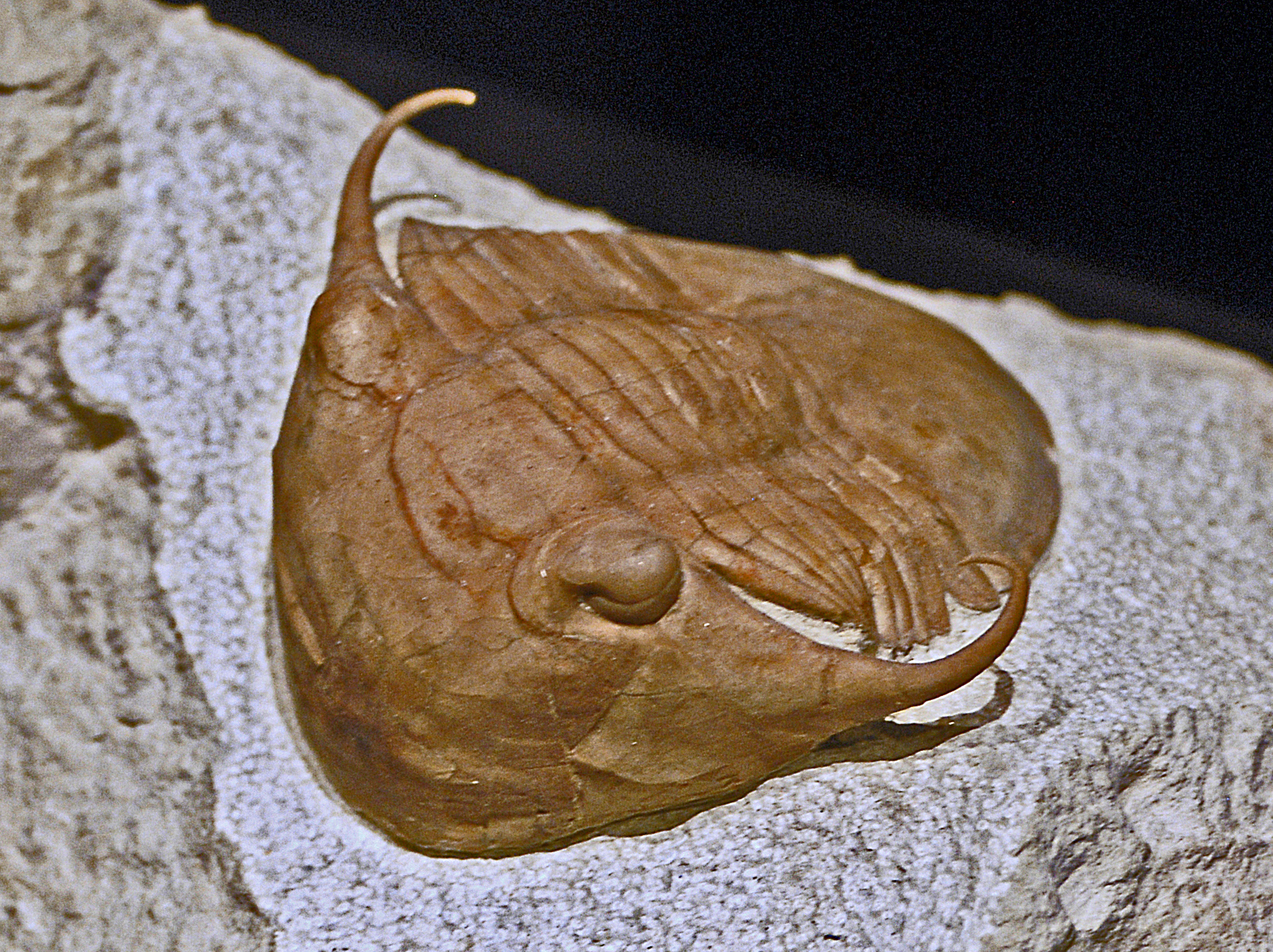
- Fossil of the Middle Ordovician trilobite Illaenus
  †Illaenus
  - †Illaenus fieldi
- †Illaneus
- †Inflatia
- †Iridopteris
  - †Iridopteris eriensis
- †Ischycondonta
- †Ischyrodonta
  - †Ischyrodonta unionoides
- †Isochilina
  - †Isochilina armata
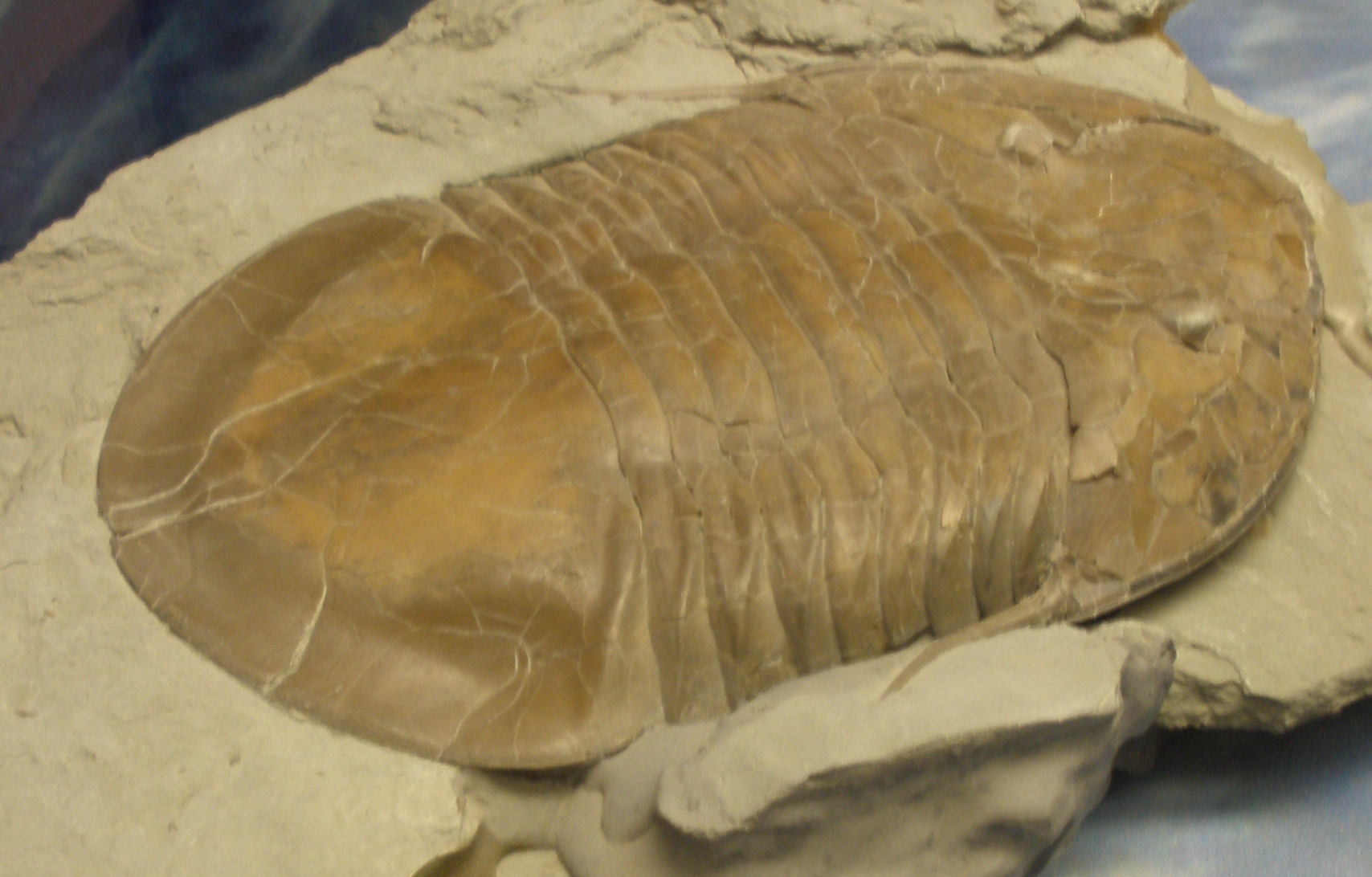
- Fossil of the Middle-Late Ordovician giant trilobite Isotelus.
  †Isotelus
  - †Isotelus maximus
  - †Isotelus megistos

== K ==
- †Kingstonia
- †Kionoceras
- †Kirkbyella
- †Komaspidella
  - †Komaspidella laevis
  - †Komaspidella lata
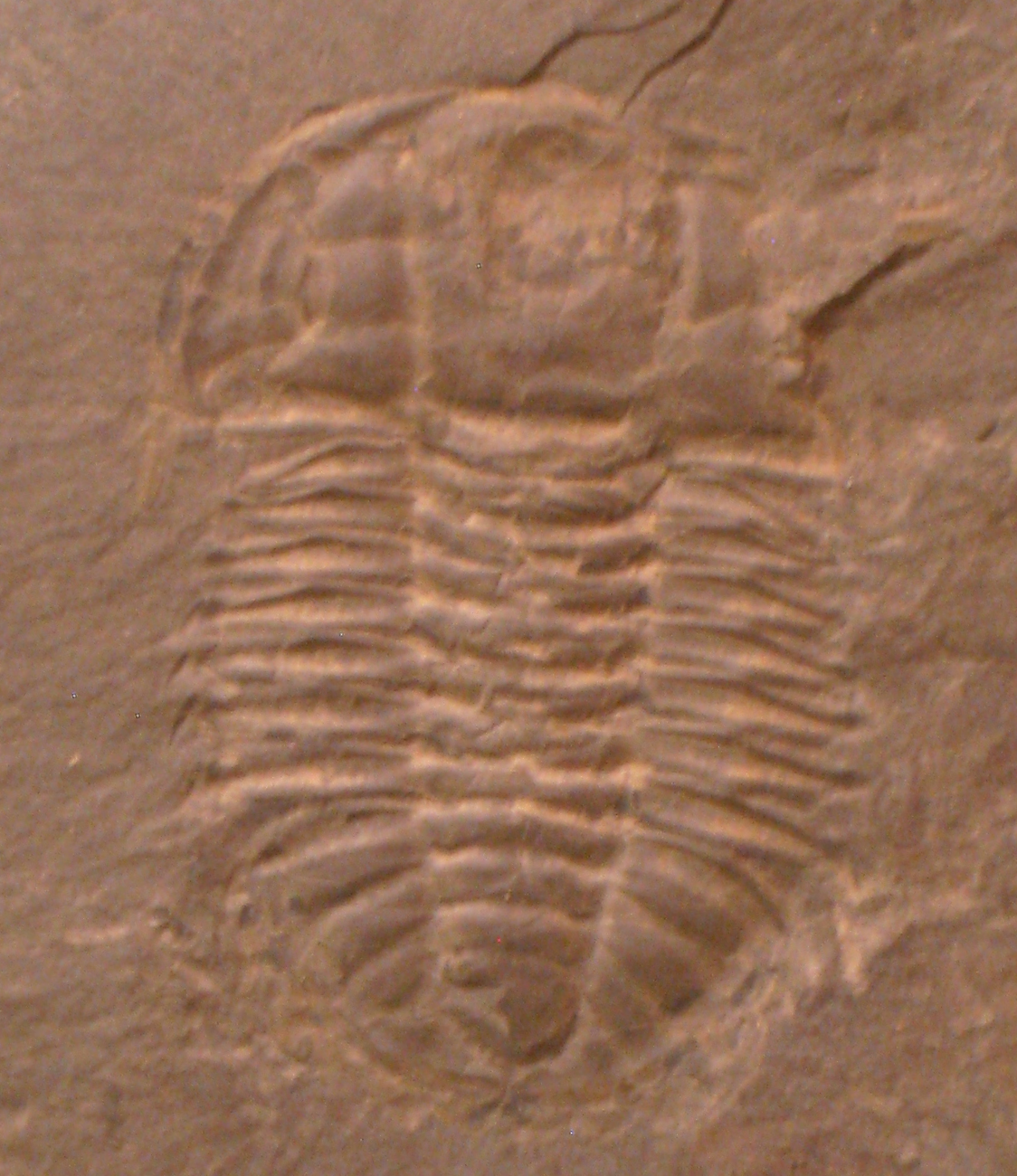
- Fossil of the Cambrian trilobite Kootenia
  †Kootenia
  - †Kootenia browni
  - †Kootenia oblivia
- †Krausella
  - †Krausella arcuata
- †Kullervo
  - †Kullervo ornata – type locality for species
  - †Kullervo parva – type locality for species
- †Kutorgina
  - †Kutorgina cingulata

== L ==
- †Labyrinthus
- †Lagenospermum
  - †Lagenospermum imparirameum
- †Lambeophyllum
- †Laticrura – type locality for genus
  - †Laticrura magna – type locality for species
  - †Laticrura pionodema – type locality for species
- †Latouchella
- †Lecanospira
  - †Lecanospira compacta
- †Leiorhynchus
  - †Leiorhynchus mesicostale
- †Leperditella
  - †Leperditella sulcata
- †Leperditia
  - †Leperditia fabulites
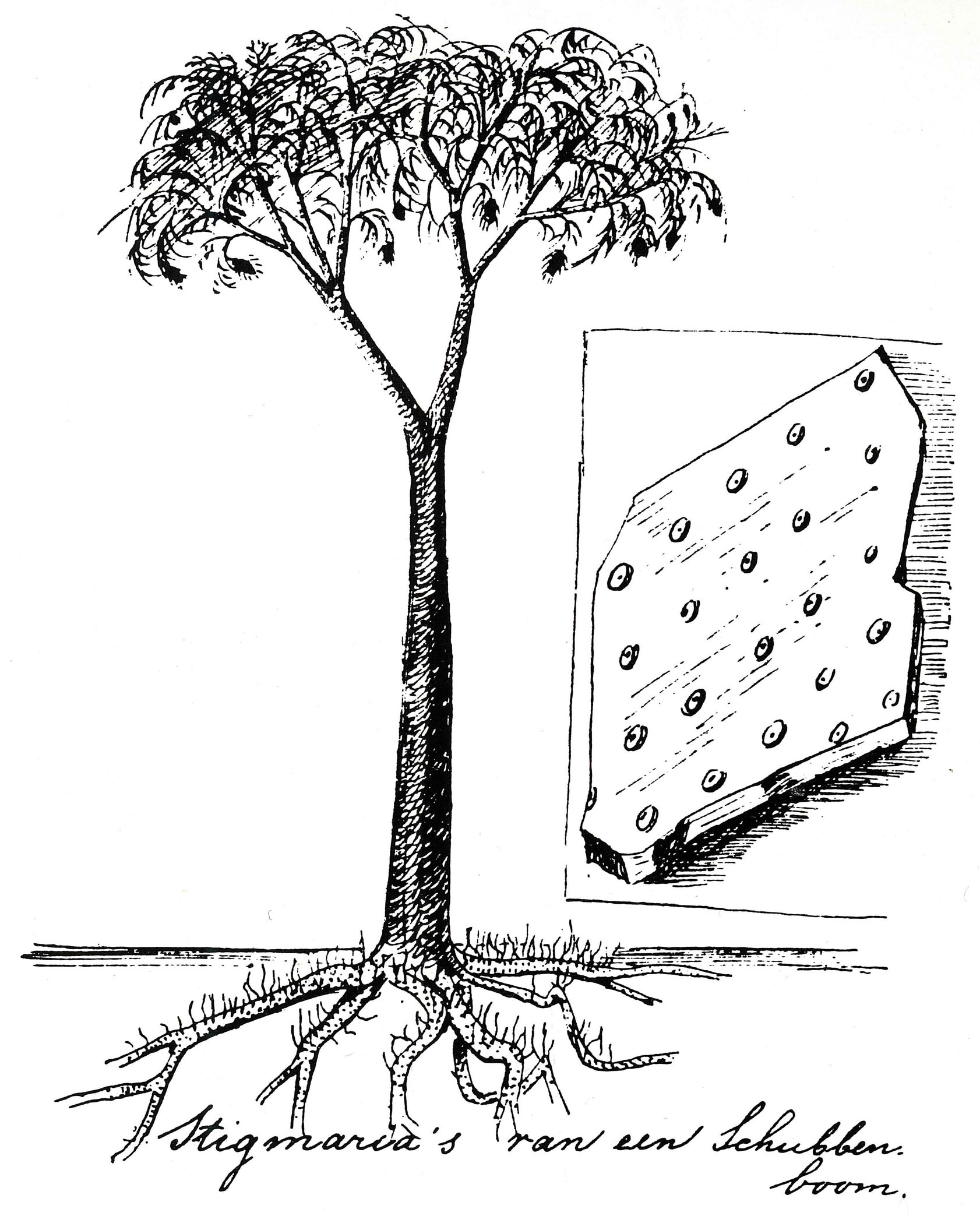
- Restoration of the Carboniferous-Late Triassic club moss relative Lepidodendron. Eli Heimans (1911).
  †Lepidodendron
- †Lepidodendropsis
  - †Lepidodendropsis scobiniformis
  - †Lepidodendropsis sigillarioides
  - †Lepidodendropsis vandergrachti
- †Leptaena
  - †Leptaena ordovicica – type locality for species
- †Leptellina
  - †Leptellina transversa – type locality for species
- †Leptobolus
- †Leptocoelia
- †Leptocyrtoceras
  - †Leptocyrtoceras virginianum
- †Leptodesma
  - †Leptodesma potens
  - †Leptodesma spinerigum
- Life restoration of the Early Ordovician nautiloid cephalopod Levisoceras
  †Levisoceras
  - †Levisoceras ellipticum
  - †Levisoceras instabile
  - †Levisoceras transitum
- †Lichenaria
  - †Lichenaria carterensis
- Lingula
  - †Lingula nicklesi – or unidentified comparable form
  - †Lingula nympha – or unidentified comparable form
- †Lingulasma
  - †Lingulasma compactum – type locality for species
- †Lingulella – tentative report
- †Liocalymene
  - †Liocalymene clintoni
- †Liospira
  - †Liospira vitruvia
- †Lithostrontionella
  - †Lithostrontionella prolifera
- †Llanoaspis
  - †Llanoaspis convexifrons
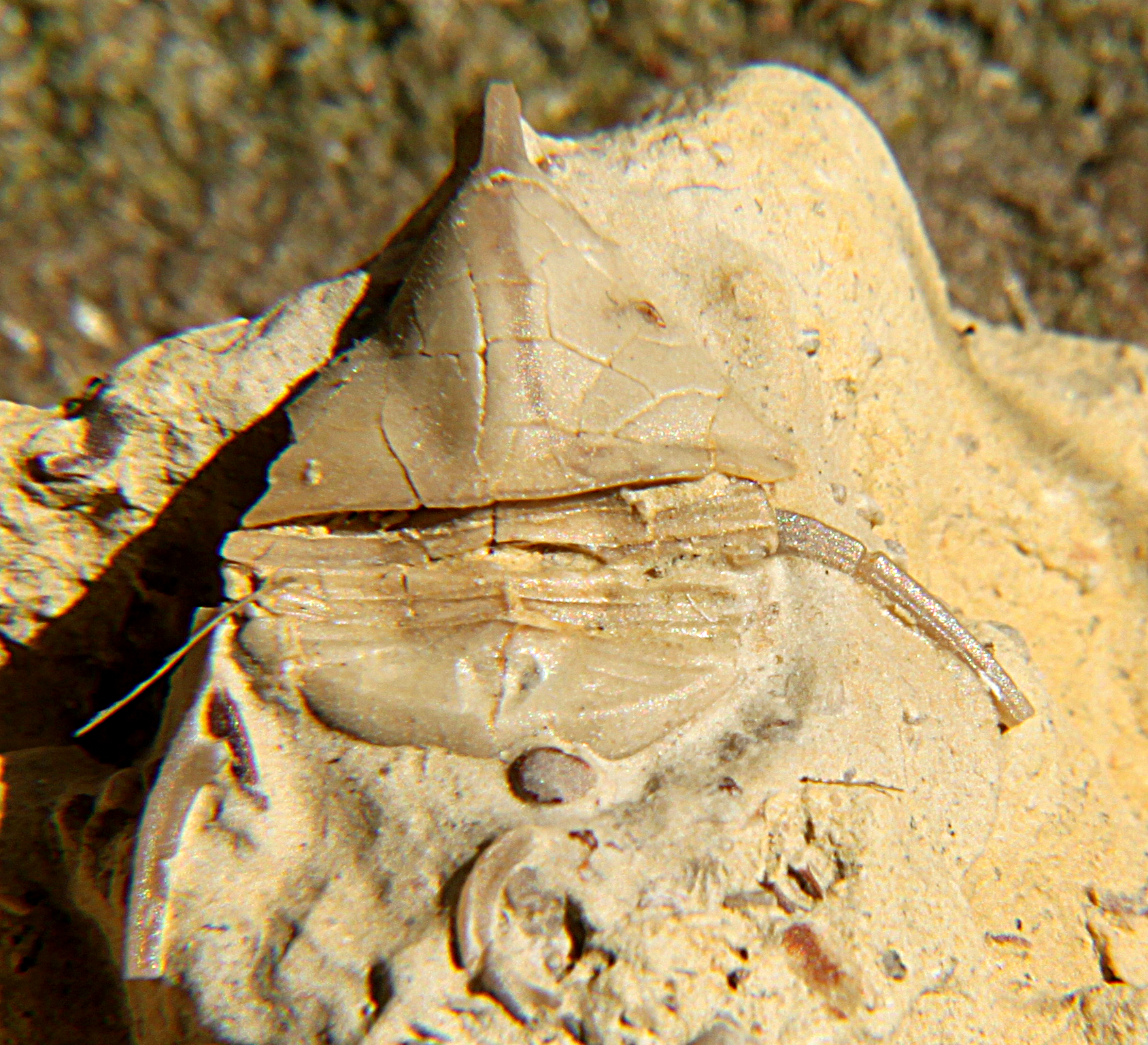
- Fossil of the Ordovician trilobite Lonchodomas
  †Lonchodomas
  - †Lonchodomas carinatus – type locality for species
- †Longispina
  - †Longispina mucronatus
- †Lophonema – tentative report
- †Lophospira
  - †Lophospira milleri
  - †Lophospira perangulata
- †Loxobucania
  - †Loxobucania emmonsi
- †Loxoplocus
- †Lyrodesma

== M ==
- †Maclurina
  - †Maclurina bigsbyi
- †Macluritella
  - †Macluritella gyroceras
  - †Macluritella multiseptarius – tentative report
  - †Macluritella uniangulata
- †Maclurites
  - †Maclurites magnus
- †Macrocoelia
  - †Macrocoelia magna
  - †Macrocoelia rotunda
- †Macropyge – tentative report
- †Marginovatia
  - †Marginovatia minor
- †Marvillia
  - †Marvillia bristolensis
- †Maryvillia
  - †Maryvillia arion
- †Mastigobolbina
  - †Mastigobolbina lata
- †Meekospira
- †Megambonia
- †Mesotaphraspis – type locality for genus
  - †Mesotaphraspis inornata – type locality for species
  - †Mesotaphraspis parva – type locality for species
- †Mesotrypa
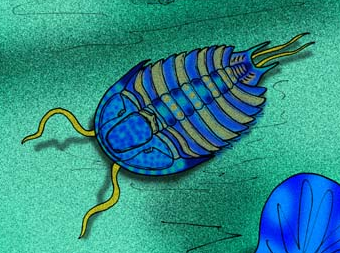
- Restoration of the Cambrian trilobite Meteoraspis
  †Meteoraspis
  - †Meteoraspis mutica
- †Mexicaspis
- †Michelinoceras
- †Microplasma
  - †Microplasma fasciculatum
- †Mimella
  - †Mimella globosa
  - †Mimella melonica
  - †Mimella vulgaris
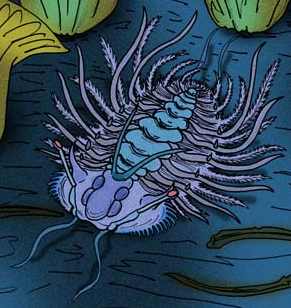
- Life restoration of the Silurian trilobite Miraspis
  †Miraspis
- †Modiolopsis
  - †Modiolopsis modiolaris
- †Monogonoceras
  - †Monogonoceras magnisiphonatum
- †Monotrypa
- †Monticulipora
- †Multicostella
  - †Multicostella brevis
  - †Multicostella bursa
  - †Multicostella platys
- †Multispinula
  - †Multispinula cuneata
- †Muriceras
- †Mytilarca

== N ==
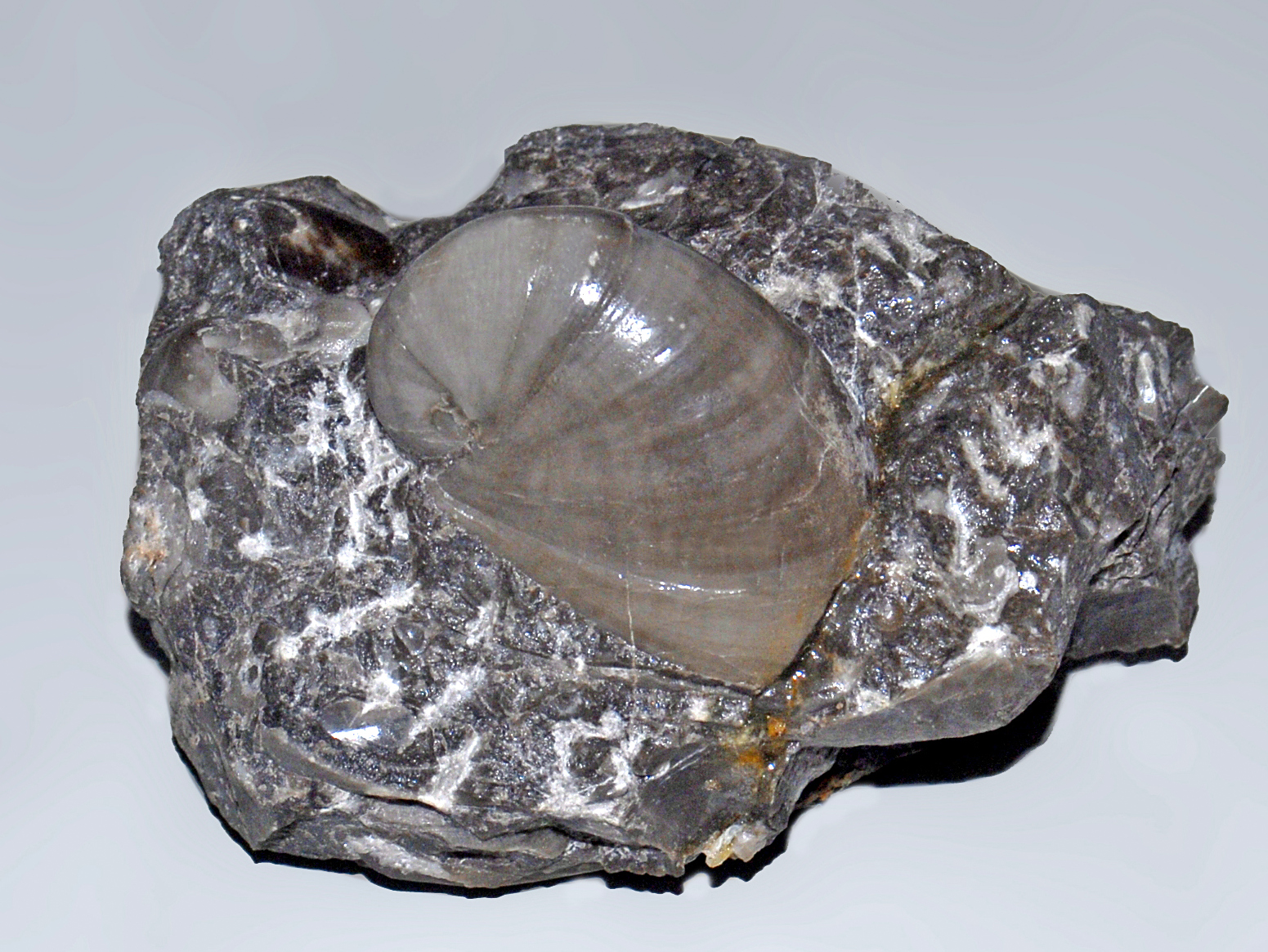
- Fossilized shell of the Early Devonian – Triassic sea snail Naticopsis
  †Naticopsis
  - †Naticopsis buttsi
- †Nemagraptus
  - †Nemagraptus gracilis
- †Neozaphrentis
- †Nervostrophia
  - †Nervostrophia nervosa
- †Nicholsonella
- †Nicholsonells
- †Nidulites
  - †Nidulites pyriformis
- †Nileus
- †Niobe
- †Nisusia
  - †Nisusia festinata
- †Nolichuckia
  - †Nolichuckia casteri
- †Norwoodella
  - †Norwoodella saffordi
- †Nothognathella
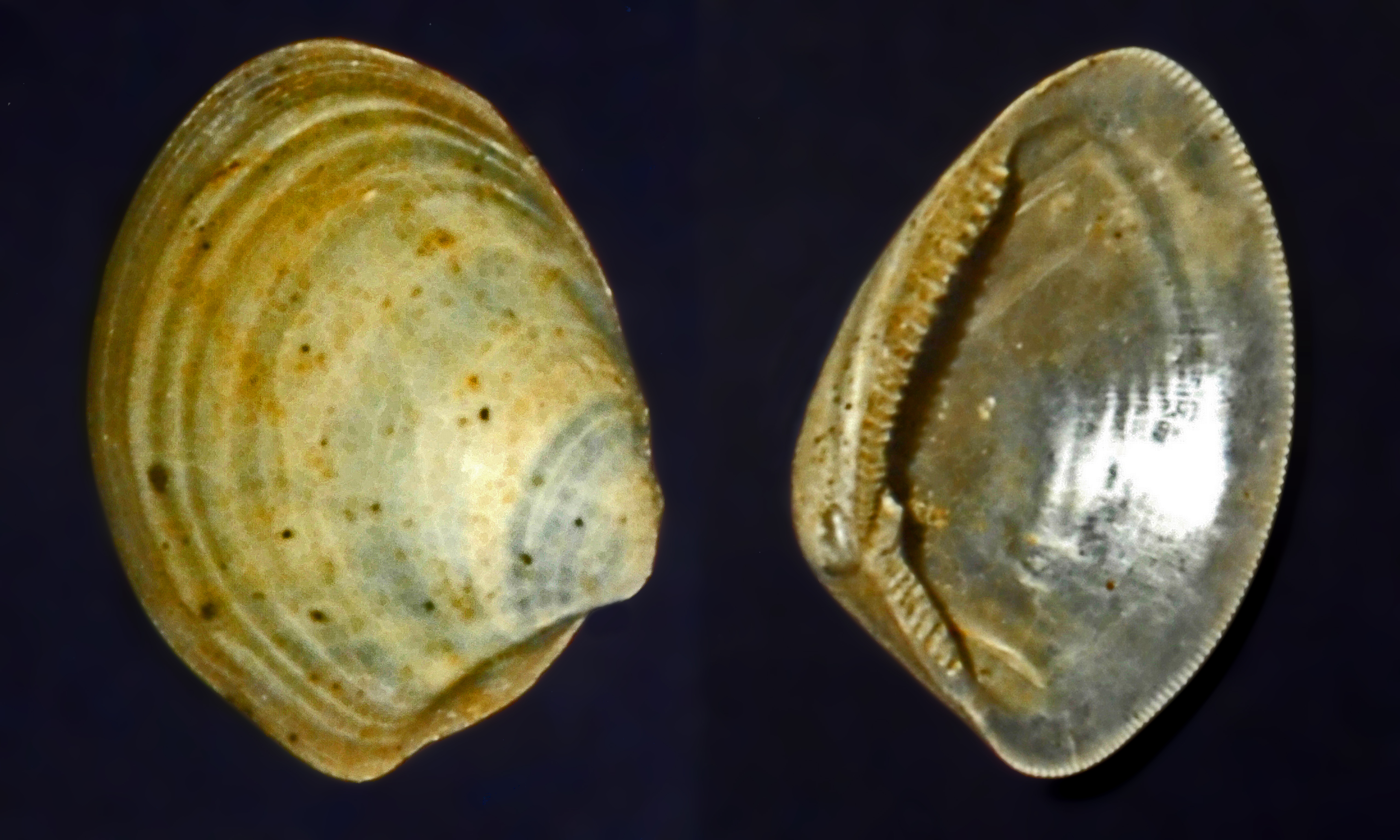
- Interior of a fossilized shell of the Early Ordovician-modern marine bivalve Nucula
  Nucula
- Nuculana
- †Nuculites
- †Nuculopsis
- †Nuia

== O ==
- †Odontopleura
- †Oepikina
  - †Oepikina minnesoteniss – report made of unidentified related form or using admittedly obsolete nomenclature
  - †Oepikina minnesotensis
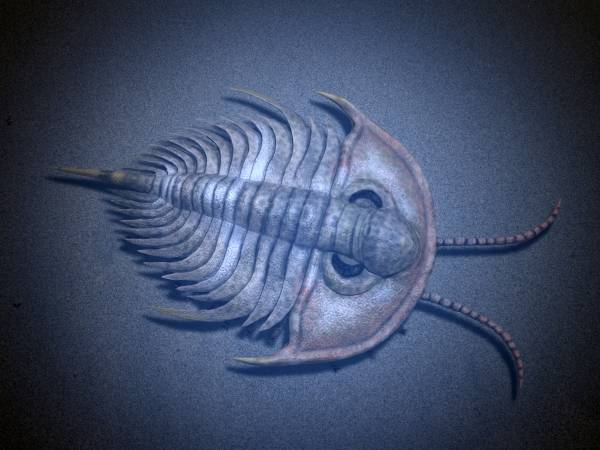
- Restoration of the Cambrian trilobite Olenellus
  †Olenellus
- †Olenoides
  - †Olenoides nitidus
- †Omospira
  - †Omospira laticincta – or unidentified comparable form
- †Onchocephalites
  - †Onchocephalites rotundiformis
- †Onchocephalus
- †Onniella
- †Onychoceras
  - †Onychoceras subrotundum
- †Ophileta
  - †Ophileta complanata
- †Ophiletina
  - †Ophiletina sublaxa
- †Opikina
  - †Opikina matutina – type locality for species
  - †Opikina varia
- †Orbiculoidea
- †Orbignyella
- †Orthambonites
  - †Orthambonites divaricatus
- †Orthoceras
  - †Orthoceras multicameratum
- †Orthodesma
  - †Orthodesma nasutum
- †Orthorhynchula
  - †Orthorhynchula linneyi – or unidentified comparable form
- †Orthotetes
- †Otarion
- †Ottoseetaxis
- †Oulodus
  - †Oulodus pectinata
- †Ovatia
  - †Ovatia ovata – or unidentified comparable form
- †Oxoplecia
  - †Oxoplecia gibbosa
  - †Oxoplecia holstonensis
  - †Oxoplecia hostonensis
  - †Oxoplecia multicostellata
  - †Oxoplecia simulatrix
- †Ozarkispira
  - †Ozarkispira subelevata – type locality for species
- †Ozarkodina

== P ==
- †Pachendoceras
  - †Pachendoceras brevicameratum – type locality for species
  - †Pachendoceras parvum
- †Pachydictya
  - †Pachydictya robusta
  - †Pachydictya senilis – or unidentified comparable form
- †Pachydomella – tentative report
- †Pachyglossella
  - †Pachyglossella pachydermata
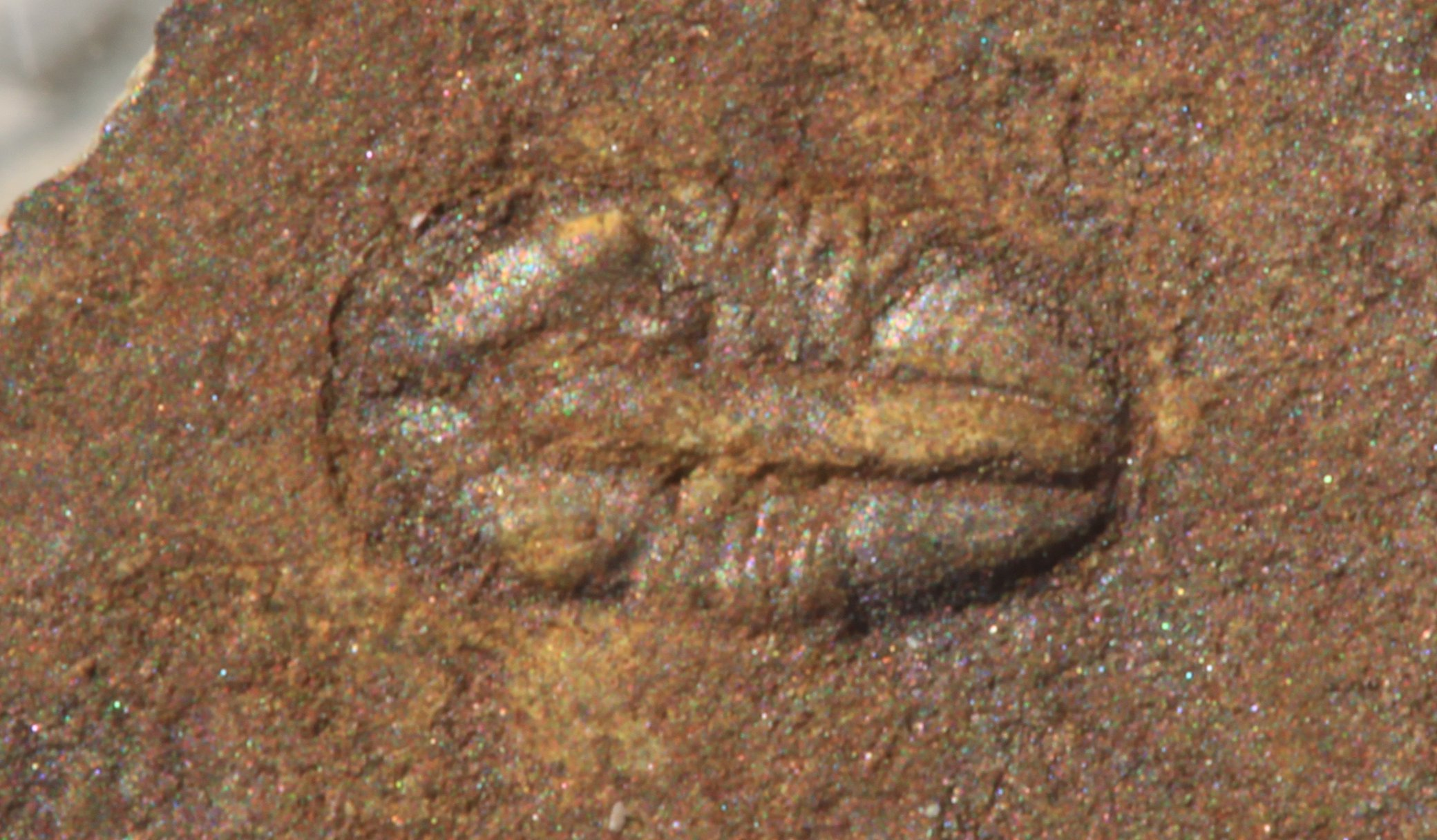
- Fossil of the Cambrian trilobite Pagetia
  †Pagetia
  - †Pagetia ellsi
- †Palaeoneilo
  - †Palaeoneilo petila
- †Palaeophycus – tentative report
- †Palaeostrophomena
  - †Palaeostrophomena subtransversa – type locality for species
- †Paleocrinus
  - †Paleocrinus striatus – or unidentified comparable form
- †Paleyoldia
- †Paractinoceras
  - †Paractinoceras lamellosum
- †Parallelostroma
  - †Parallelostroma kaugatomicum
  - †Parallelostroma keyserense – type locality for species
  - †Parallelostroma longicolumnum – type locality for species
  - †Parallelostroma microporum
  - †Parallelostroma multicolumnum – type locality for species
  - †Parallelostroma typicum
- †Paraparchites – tentative report
- †Pararaphistoma – or unidentified comparable form
- †Parastrophina
- †Paratalarocrinus – type locality for genus
  - †Paratalarocrinus transitorius – type locality for species
- †Paterina
- †Pattella
  - †Pattella massanuttense
- †Paucicrura
- †Pauorthis
- †Paupospira
  - †Paupospira burginensis
  - †Paupospira sumnerensis
  - †Paupospira tropidophora
- †Paurorthis
  - †Paurorthis ponderosa
- †Pemphigaspis
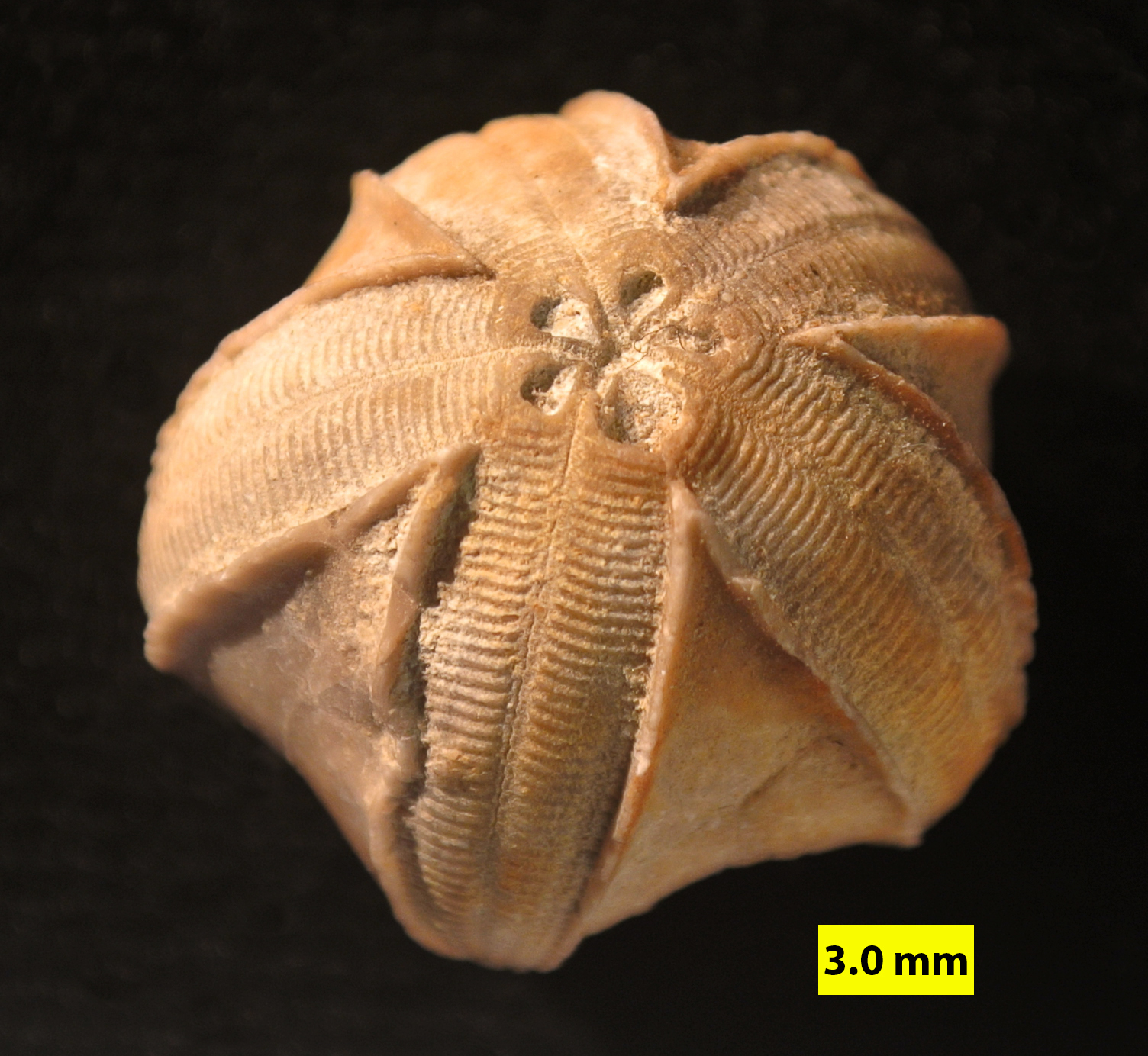
- Fossilized theca of the Carboniferous blastoid echinoderm ("sea bud") Pentremites
  †Pentremites
  - †Pentremites planus – tentative report
- †Perimecocoelia
  - †Perimecocoelia semicostata
  - †Perimecocoelia triangulata
- †Peronopora
- †Phaenopora
- †Phestia
- †Phillipsia
- †Pholidops
  - †Pholidops areolata
  - †Pholidops cincinnatiensis
- †Phragmolites
  - †Phragmolites triangularis – or unidentified comparable form
- †Phragmorthis – type locality for genus
  - †Phragmorthis buttsi – type locality for species
- †Phyllodictya
  - †Phyllodictya frondosa
- †Phylloporina
- Pinna
- †Pionodema
  - †Pionodema miniscula
  - †Pionodema subaequata
- †Plaesiomys
- †Platyceras
- †Platycrinus
  - †Platycrinus penicillus
- †Platyrachella
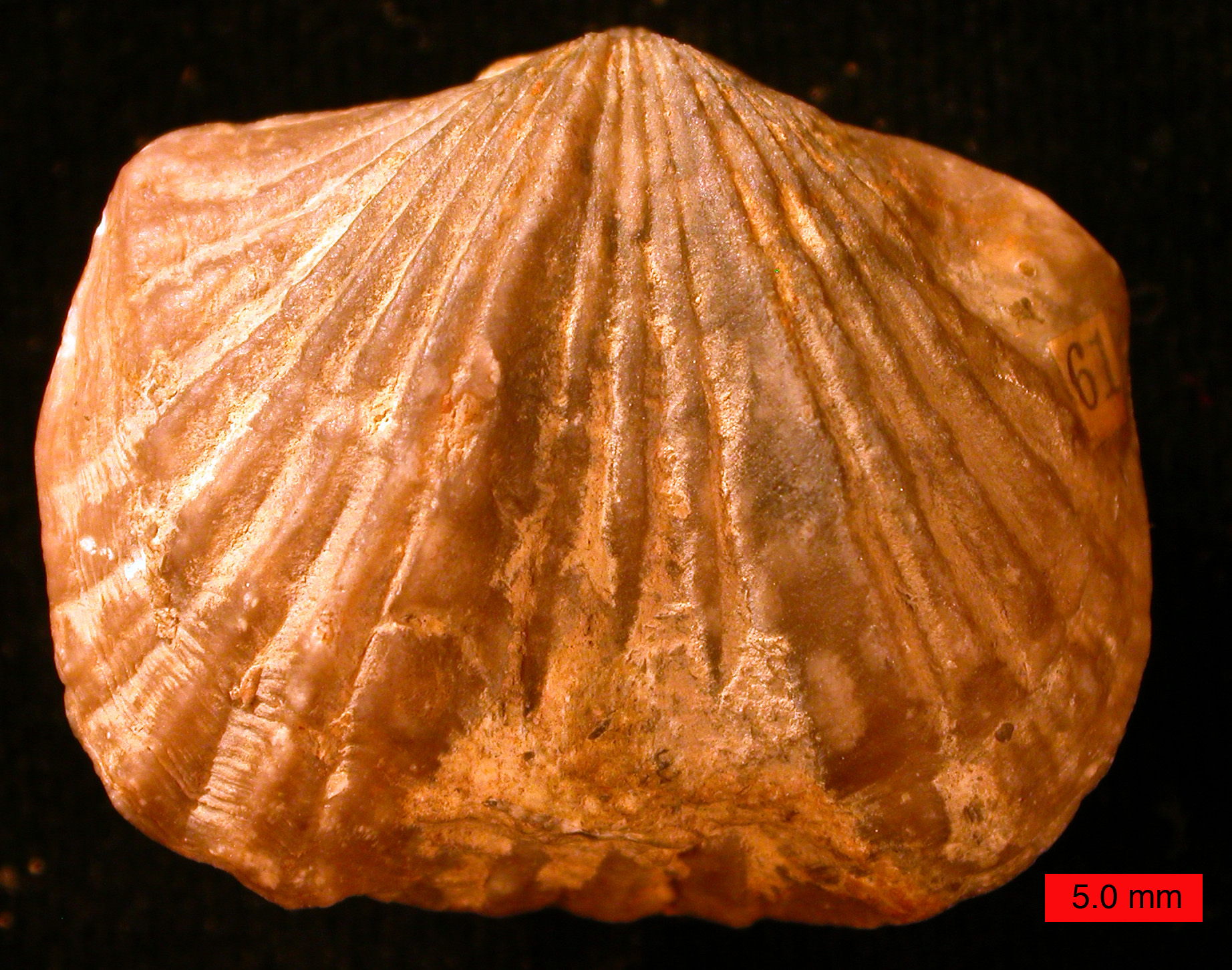
- Fossilized shell of the Middle Ordovician-Silurian brachiopod Platystrophia
  †Platystrophia
- †Plectocamara
- †Plectoceras
  - †Plectoceras bondi
- †Plectonotus
- †Plectorthis
  - †Plectorthis exfoliata – or unidentified comparable form
- †Plethobolbina
- †Plethrospira – tentative report
- †Plexodictyon
  - †Plexodictyon waparksi – or unidentified comparable form
- †Pliomerella
- †Pocononia
  - †Pocononia whitei – type locality for species
- †Pojetaconcha – tentative report
- †Poliella
  - †Poliella virginica
- †Polylopia
  - †Polylopia billingsi
- †Polypora
  - †Polypora impressa – tentative report
- †Posidonia
  - †Posidonia becheri
- †Praenucula
  - †Praenucula albertina
- †Prasopora
- †Primaspis
  - †Primaspis ascitus – type locality for species
- †Primitiella
  - †Primitiella constricta
- †Prioniodina
- †Prismostylus
  - †Prismostylus fibratum
- †Probolichas
  - †Probolichas pandus – type locality for species
- †Productella
- †Productorthis
  - †Productorthis agilera
- †Productus
  - †Productus altonensis
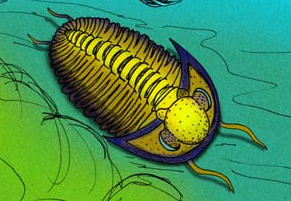
- Restoration of the Silurian trilobite Proetus
  †Proetus
  - †Proetus crassimarginatus
- †Prothyris
- †Protobarinophyton
- †Protolepidodendron
  - †Protolepidodendron primaevum
- †Protoleptostrophia
  - †Protoleptostrophia perplana
- †Protostigmaria
  - †Protostigmaria eggertiana
- †Protozyga
  - †Protozyga uniplicata – type locality for species
- †Prozacanthoides
  - †Prozacanthoides clearbranchensis
  - †Prozacanthoides virginicus
- †Pseudagnostus
  - †Pseudagnostus communis
- †Pseudosphaerexochus
- †Pterinea
  - †Pterinea insueta
  - †Pterinea maternata
- †Pterocephalops
  - †Pterocephalops acrophthalma
- †Pterocrinus
  - †Pterocrinus serratus
- †Pterygometopus
- †Ptychoglyptus
  - †Ptychoglyptus virginiensis
- †Ptychopleurella
  - †Ptychopleurella mediocostata – type locality for species
  - †Ptychopleurella rectangulata – type locality for species
  - †Ptychopleurella sulcata
- †Punctospirifer
  - †Punctospirifer transversa – or unidentified comparable form
  - †Punctospirifer transversus

== Q ==
- †Quebecaspis
  - †Quebecaspis conifrons
  - †Quebecaspis marylandica

== R ==
- †Rafinesquina
  - †Rafinesquina altenata
  - †Rafinesquina alternata
  - †Rafinesquina deltoidea – or unidentified comparable form
  - †Rafinesquina fracta
  - †Rafinesquina obsoleta – or unidentified comparable form
  - †Rafinesquina planulata – type locality for species
  - †Rafinesquina pulchella
- †Raphistomina
- †Raymondaspis
  - †Raymondaspis gregarius
- †Raymondella
  - †Raymondella elegans
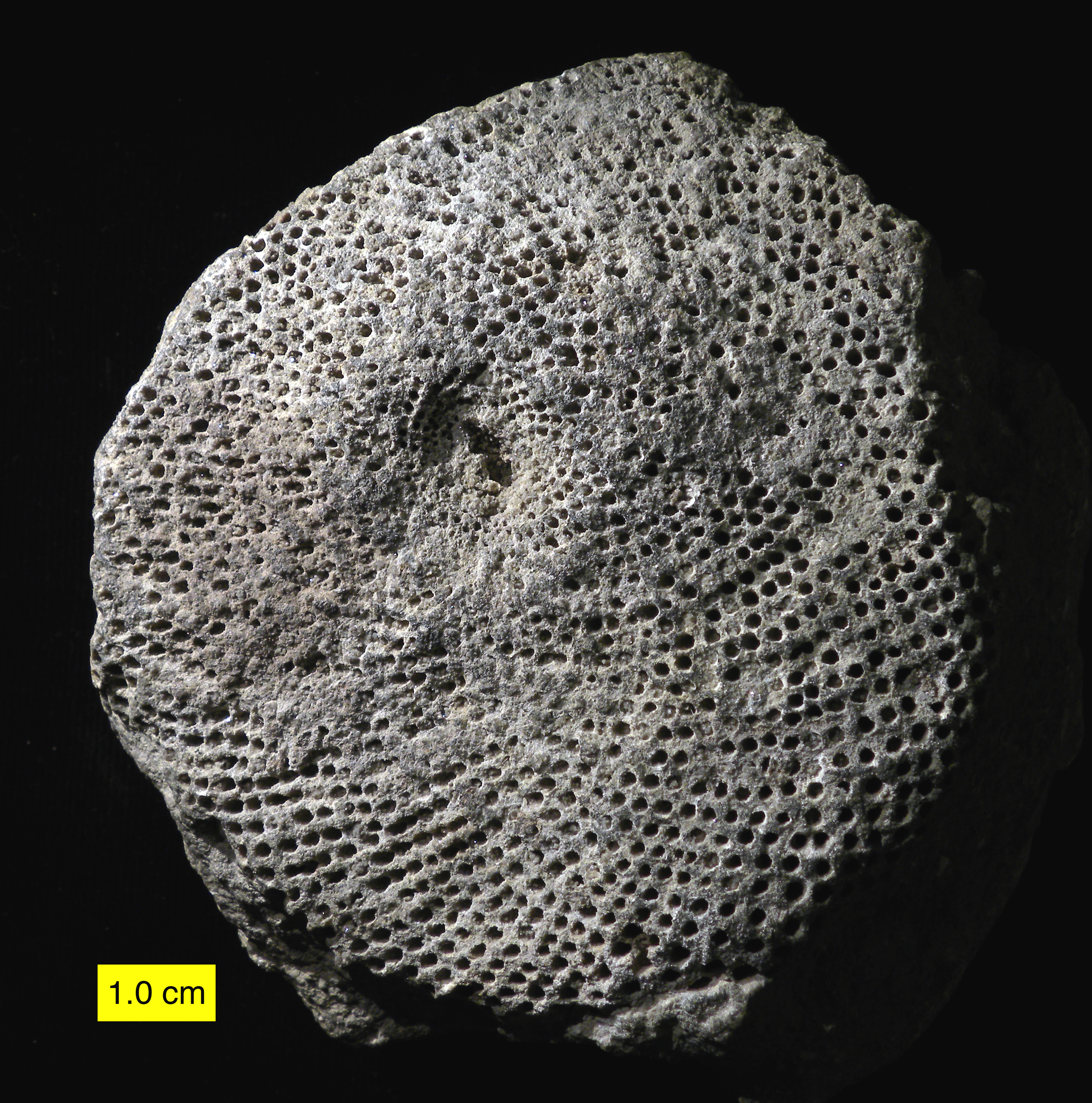
- Fossil of the Early Ordovician-Permian benthic alga Receptaculites
  †Receptaculites
  - †Receptaculites biconstrictus
  - †Receptaculites occidentalis
- †Redstonia
  - †Redstonia cooperi
- †Regnellicystis
  - †Regnellicystis typicalis
- †Remopleurides
  - †Remopleurides asperulus – type locality for species
  - †Remopleurides caelatus – type locality for species
  - †Remopleurides caphyroides – type locality for species
  - †Remopleurides eximius – type locality for species
  - †Remopleurides plaesiourus – type locality for species
  - †Remopleurides simulus – type locality for species
- †Resserella
  - †Resserella rogata
- †Reticestus – tentative report
- †Reticulariina
  - †Reticulariina spinosa – or unidentified comparable form
- †Reuschella
  - †Reuschella americana – type locality for species
  - †Reuschella edsoni
- †Rhacophyton
- †Rhacopteris
- †Rhinidictya
  - †Rhinidictya nicholsoni
- †Rhipidomena
  - †Rhipidomena tennesseensis
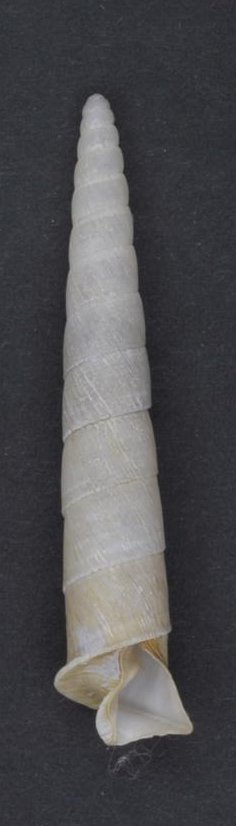
- Shell of a Rhodea land snail
  †Rhodea
  - †Rhodea blacksburgensis – type locality for species
  - †Rhodea vespertina – type locality for species
- †Rhombopora
  - †Rhombopora simulatrix
- †Rhynchotrema
- †Rhytimya
- †Robergia
  - †Robergia major
- †Robergiella
  - †Robergiella sagittalis – type locality for species
- †Robsonoceras
- †Rodea
  - †Rodea vespertina – type locality for species
- Rostricellula
  - †Rostricellula plena
  - †Rostricellula pristina
- †Rothpletzella
- †Ruedemannia
  - †Ruedemannia lirata

== S ==
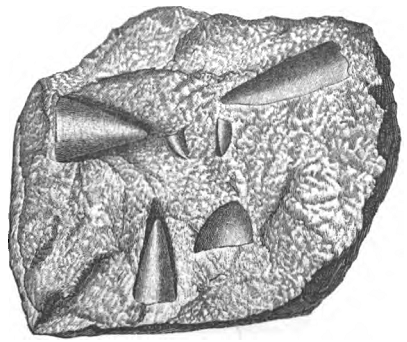
- Illustration of fossilized shells of the mysterious Cambrian organism Salterella
  †Salterella
  - †Salterella conulata
- †Salteria
  - †Salteria americana
- †Sanguinolites
- †Scaphorthis
  - †Scaphorthis perplexa – type locality for species
- †Scenellopora
  - †Scenellopora radiata
- †Schellwienella – tentative report
- †Schizambon
  - †Schizambon cuneatus
  - †Schizambon macrothyris
- †Schizodus
- †Schizophoria
  - †Schizophoria impressa
- †Schizotreta
- †Schuchertella
  - †Schuchertella desiderata
  - †Schuchertella pandora
- †Scotoharpes
- †Sedgwickia
- †Sellenopora
- †Septopora
  - †Septopora cestriensis
- †Sinuopea
  - †Sinuopea basiplanata – or unidentified related form
- †Siphonodella
  - †Siphonodella duplicata
- †Skenidioides
  - †Skenidioides mediocostatus – type locality for species
  - †Skenidioides transversus – type locality for species
- Solemya
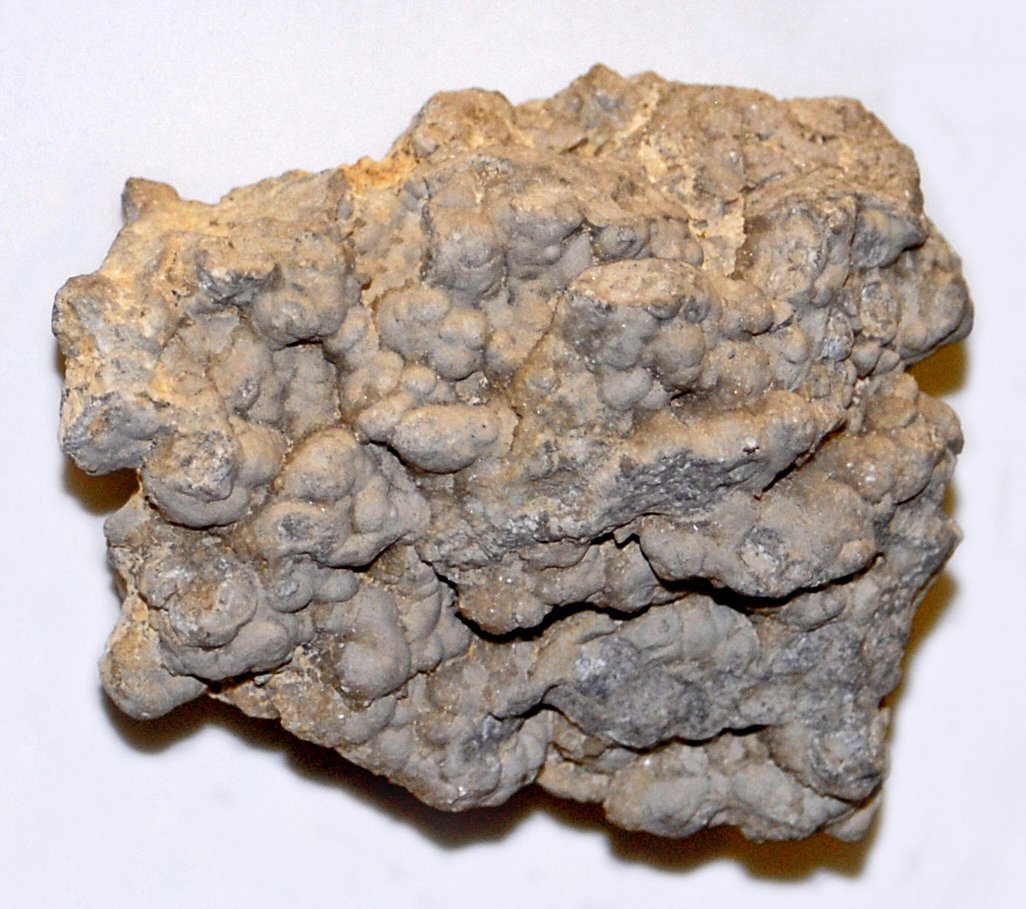
- Fossils of the red alga Solenopora
  †Solenopora
  - †Solenopora compacta
- †Sowerbyella
  - †Sowerbyella acquistriata – or unidentified related form
  - †Sowerbyella aequistriata – or unidentified comparable form
  - †Sowerbyella curdsvillensis
  - †Sowerbyella delicatula
  - †Sowerbyella lebanonensis – or unidentified comparable form
  - †Sowerbyella levanonensis – or unidentified comparable form
  - †Sowerbyella negrita – or unidentified comparable form
  - †Sowerbyella pisum
  - †Sowerbyella rugosa
  - †Sowerbyella sericea – report made of unidentified related form or using admittedly obsolete nomenclature
  - †Sowerbyella silicica – type locality for species
  - †Sowerbyella socialis
- †Sowerbyites
  - †Sowerbyites triseptatus
- †Sowrbyella
- †Spathella
- †Spathognathodus
- †Spencella
  - †Spencella virginica
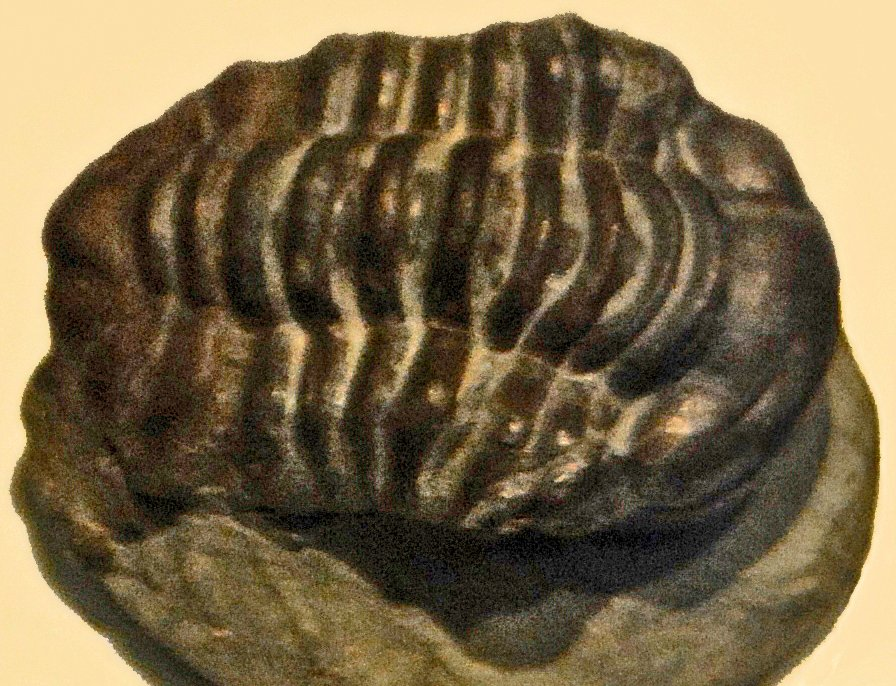
- Fossil of the Middle Ordovician-Silurian trilobite Sphaerexochus
  †Sphaerexochus
  - †Sphaerexochus hapsidotus – type locality for species
  - †Sphaerexochus pulcher – type locality for species
- †Sphaerocoryphe
  - †Sphaerocoryphe gemina – type locality for species
  - †Sphaerocoryphe longispina – type locality for species
- †Sphenotreta
  - †Sphenotreta acutirostris
- †Spinatrypa
  - †Spinatrypa spinosa
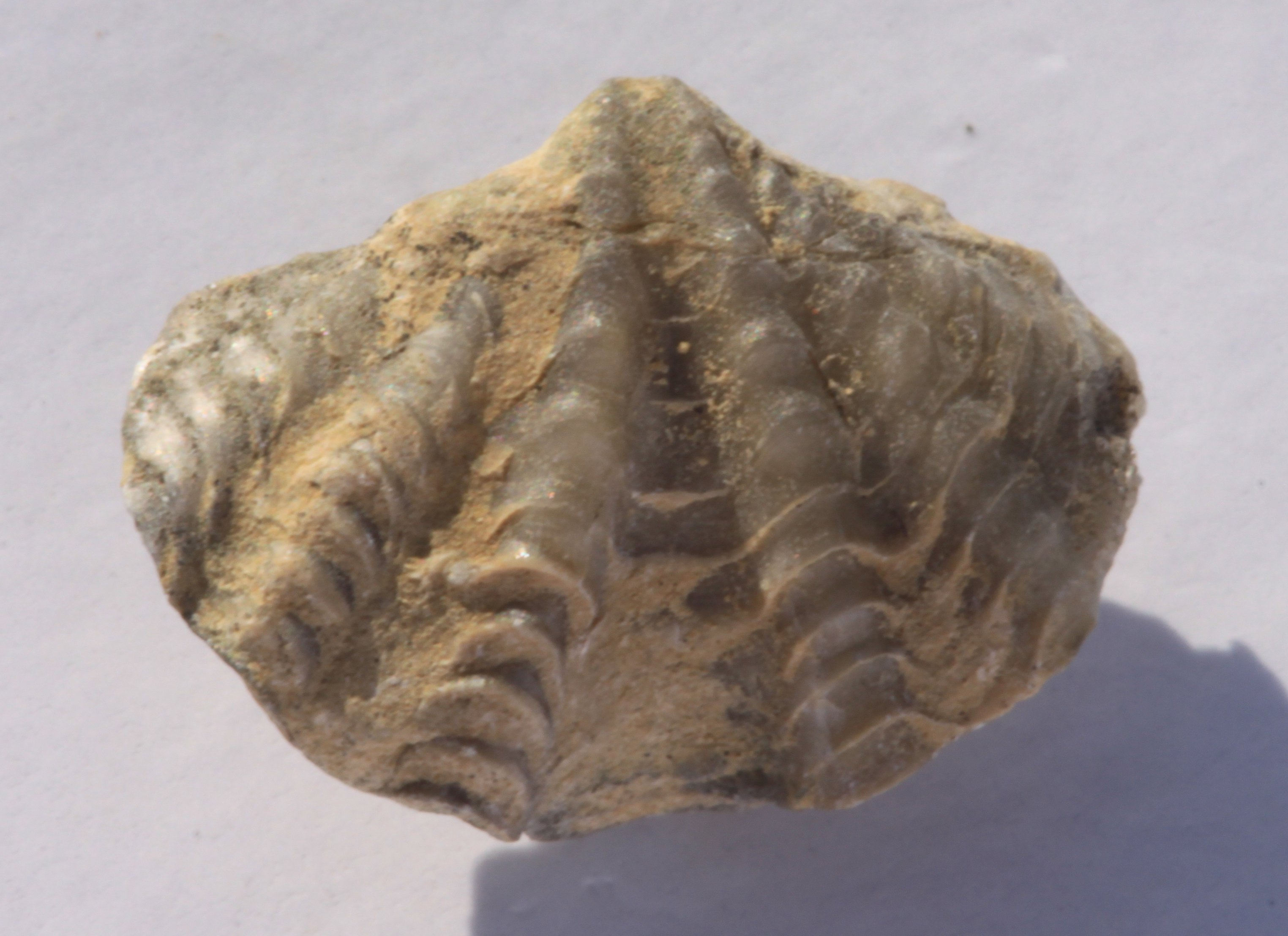
- Fossilized shell of the Late Ordovician-Late Triassic brachiopod Spirifer
  †Spirifer
  - †Spirifer bifurcatus
  - †Spirifer macrus
  - †Spirifer marcyi – tentative report
  - †Spirifer mesistrialis
  - †Spirifer stratiformis – or unidentified comparable form
  - †Spirifer striatiformis – or unidentified comparable form
  - †Spirifer varicosus
  - †Spirifer winchelli – tentative report
- †Spongophylloides
- †Spyroceras
- †Stegerhynchus
  - †Stegerhynchus neglectum
- †Stenoblepharum – broadly construed
  - †Stenoblepharum strasburgense – type locality for species
- †Stenopareia
- †Stictopora
- †Strepulites
- †Stromatocerium
  - †Stromatocerium rugosum
- †Stromatoceruium
  - †Stromatoceruium rugosum
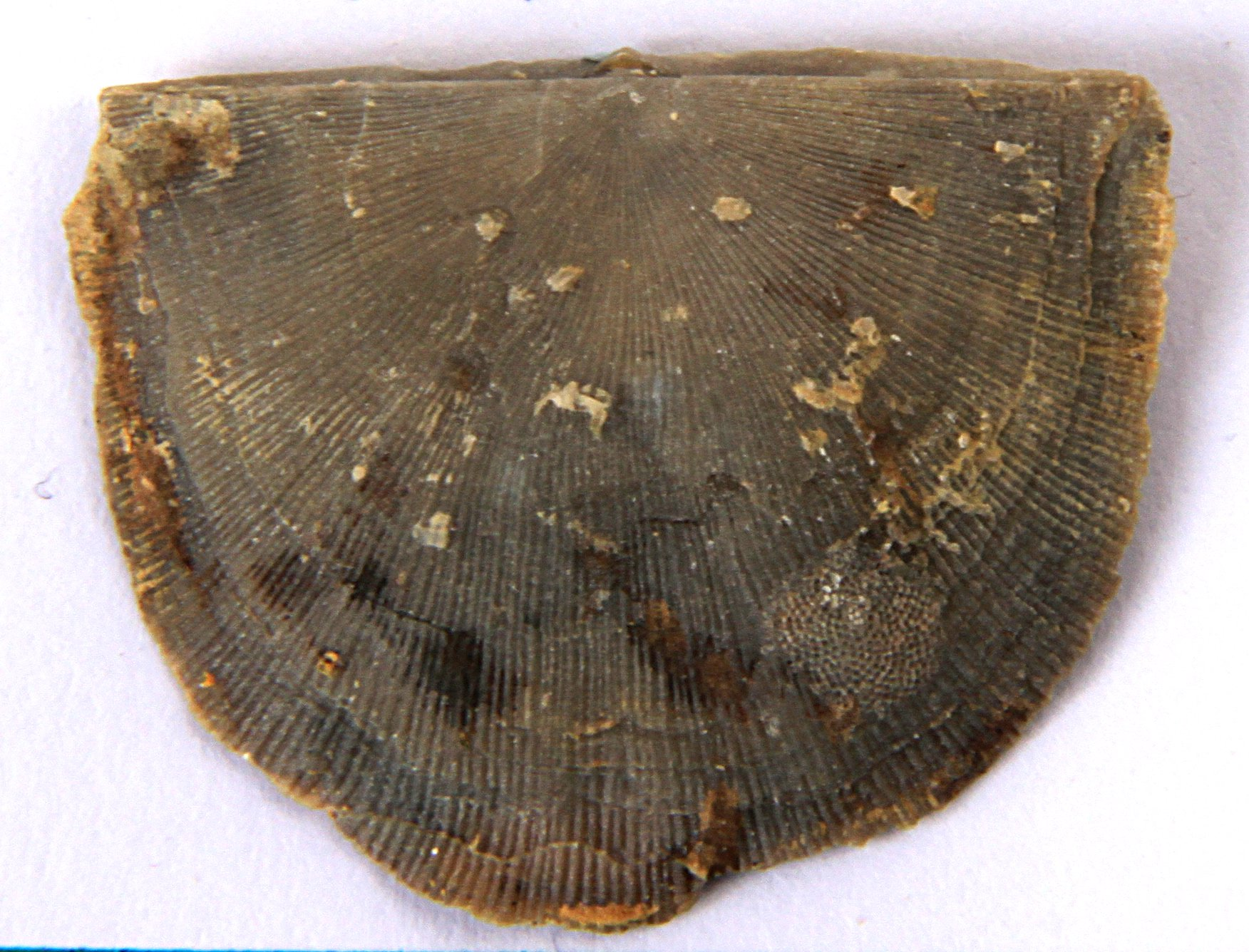
- Fossilized shell of the Ordovician-Silurian brachiopod Strophomena
  †Strophomena
  - †Strophomena emaciata
  - †Strophomena filitexta
  - †Strophomena incurvata
  - †Strophomena sculpturatus
  - †Strophomena tennesseensus
  - †Strophomena tenuitesta
- †Strphomena
  - †Strphomena incurvata
- †Subligaculum
- †Subulites
  - †Subulites regularis
- †Sulevorthis
  - †Sulevorthis bielsteini
  - †Sulevorthis parvicrassicostatus
- †Synprioniodina
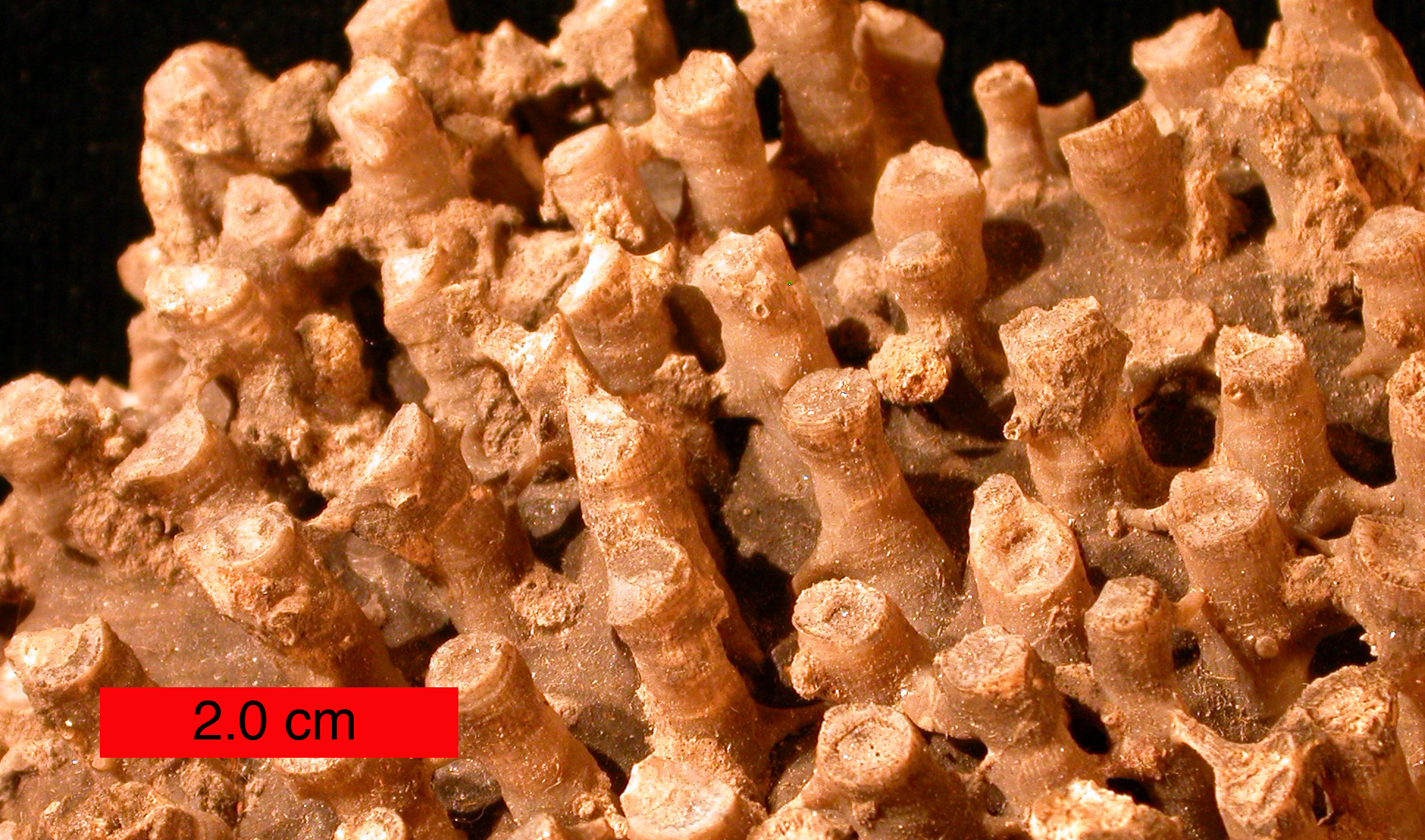
- Fossil of the Devonian tabulate coral Syringopora
  †Syringopora
  - †Syringopora virginica
- †Syringothyris
  - †Syringothyris textus – or unidentified comparable form

== T ==
- †Tabulipora
  - †Tabulipora tuberculata
- †Taenicephalites
  - †Taenicephalites macrops
- †Talarocrinus
  - †Talarocrinus trijugis – or unidentified comparable form
- †Tancrediopsis
- †Taphrorthis
  - †Taphrorthis peculiaris
- †Telephina
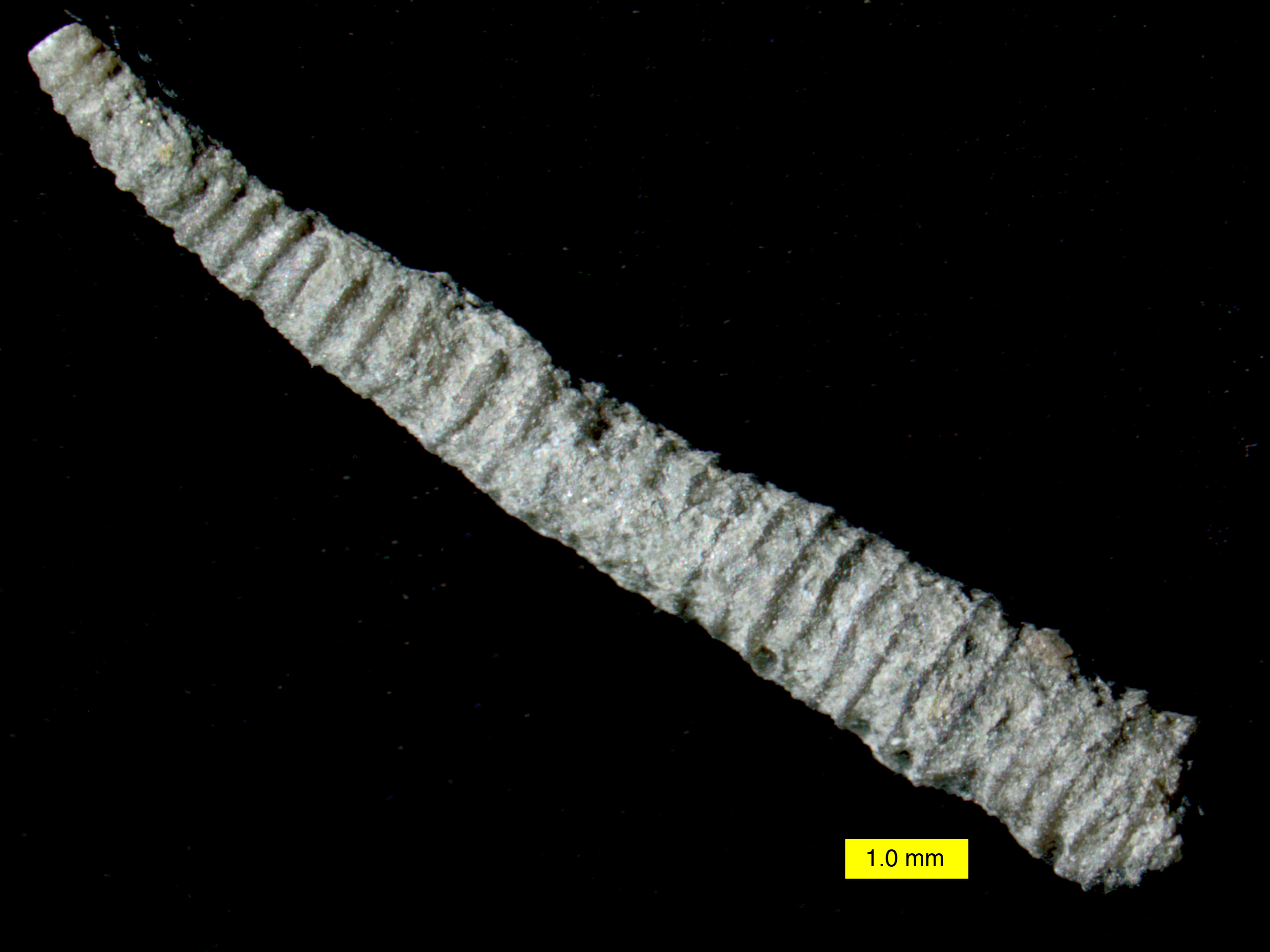
- Fossilized shell of the Early Ordovician-Late Devonian probable mollusc Tentaculites
  †Tentaculites
  - †Tentaculites lowdoni – type locality for species
  - †Tentaculites minutus
  - †Tentaculites scalaris
- †Terranovella
  - †Terranovella dorsalis
- †Teteracamera – tentative report
- †Tetracamera
- †Tetradium
  - †Tetradium cellulosum
  - †Tetradium clarki – tentative report
  - †Tetradium columnare – tentative report
  - †Tetradium racemosum
  - †Tetradium syringoporoides
- †Tetralobula
  - †Tetralobula delicatula
- †Thaleops
  - †Thaleops conradi
- †Titanambonites
  - †Titanambonites crassus
- †Torynifer
  - †Torynifer pseudolineata – or unidentified comparable form
  - †Torynifer pseudolineatus
- †Tretaspis
  - †Tretaspis sagenosus
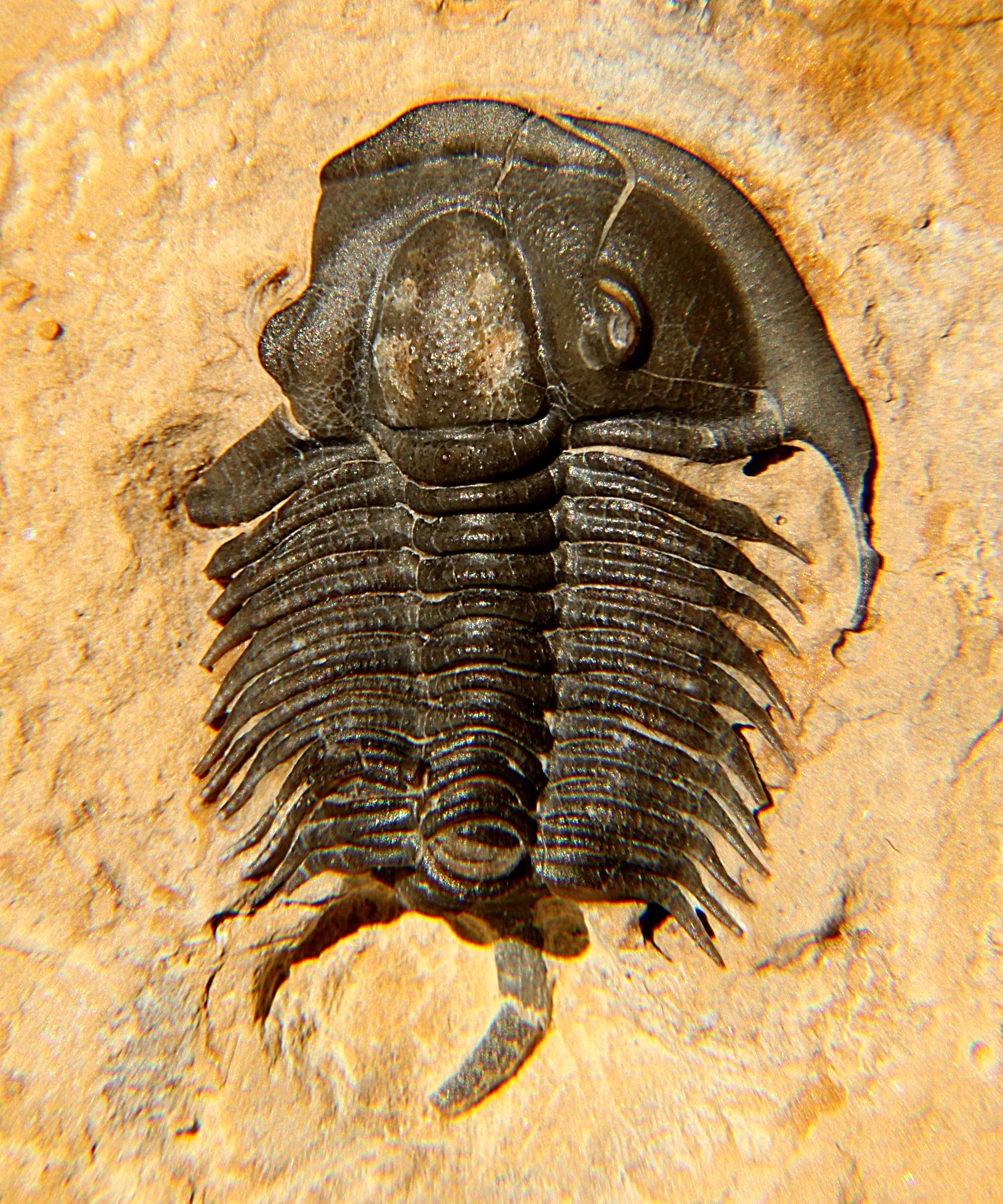
- Fossil of the Cambrian trilobite Tricrepicephalus
  †Tricrepicephalus
  - †Tricrepicephalus cedarensis
  - †Tricrepicephalus simplex
- †Trinodus
  - †Trinodus elspethi
- †Triphyllopteris
  - †Triphyllopteris alleghanensis
  - †Triphyllopteris biloba – type locality for species
  - †Triphyllopteris lascuriana
  - †Triphyllopteris latilobata – type locality for species
  - †Triphyllopteris lescuriana
  - †Triphyllopteris lesuriana
  - †Triphyllopteris rarinervis – type locality for species
  - †Triphyllopteris uberis
  - †Triphyllopteris virginiana
- †Trocholitoceras
  - †Trocholitoceras bevani
- †Trochonema
  - †Trochonema bellulum
  - †Trochonema trochonemoides – tentative report
  - †Trochonema umbilicata
- †Tropidodiscus
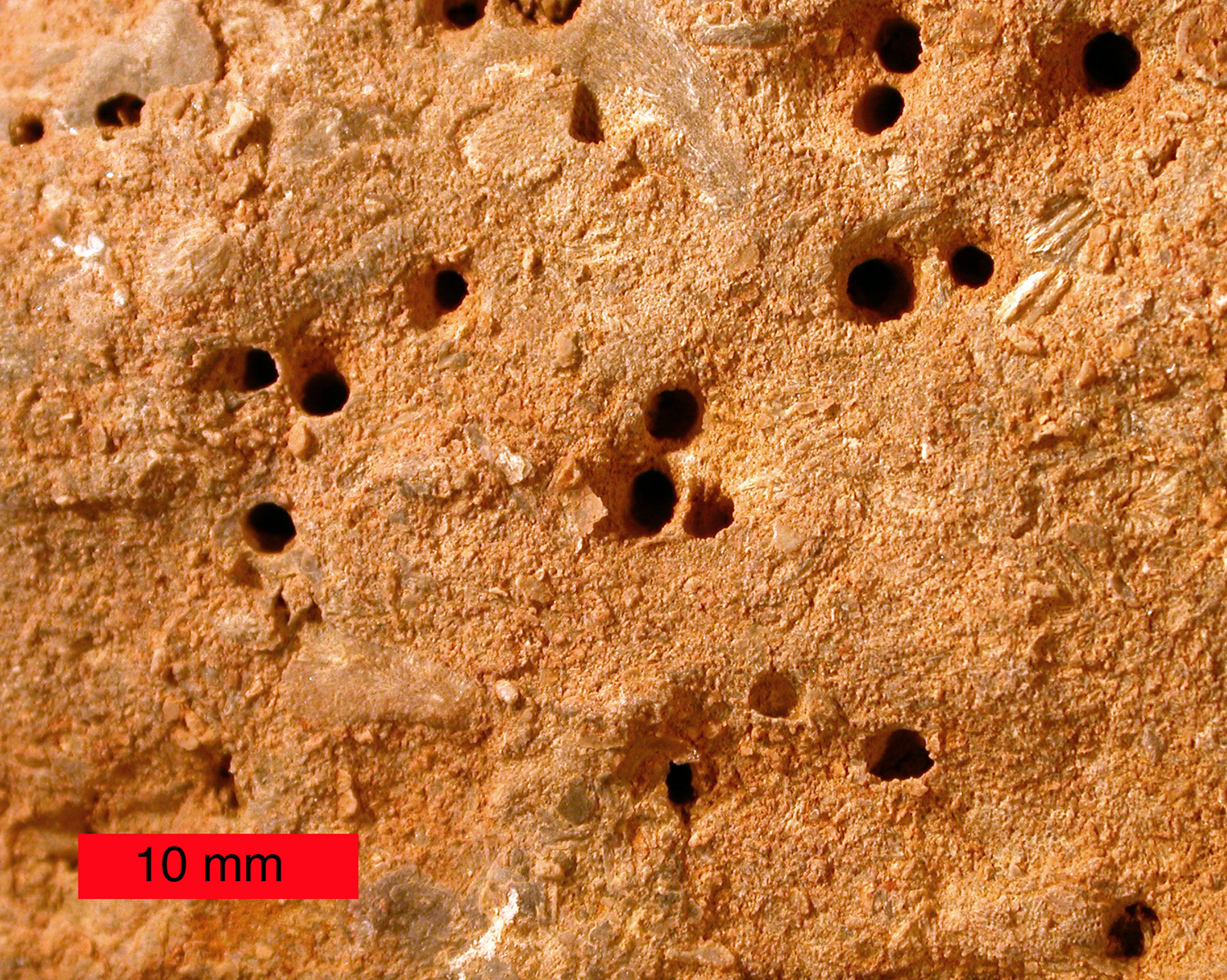
- Fossils of the bore-hole ichnogenus Trypanites
  Trypanites
- †Tryplasma
- †Tubulibairdia
- †Tylothyris
  - †Tylothyris mesacostalis

== U ==
- †Ulrichia
- †Uncinulus

== V ==
- †Valcourea
  - †Valcourea crassa – or unidentified comparable form
  - †Valcourea deflecta – or unidentified comparable form
  - †Valcourea delfecta – or unidentified comparable form
  - †Valcourea semicarinata – type locality for species
- †Vanuxemia
  - †Vanuxemia crassa – or unidentified comparable form

== W ==
- †Wilkingia
- †Wilsoniella
- †Woosteroceras
  - †Woosteroceras chepultepecense – type locality for species

== Z ==
- †Zaphrenthis
  - †Zaphrenthis spinulosa
- †Zaphrentites
  - †Zaphrentites spinulosa – or unidentified comparable form
- †Zelophyllum
- †Zygobolba
  - †Zygobolba decora
- †Zygosella
- †Zygospira
  - †Zygospira lebanonensis
  - †Zygospira modesta
