= List of the prehistoric life of South Dakota =

This list of the prehistoric life of South Dakota contains the various prehistoric life-forms whose fossilized remains have been reported from within the US state of South Dakota.

== Precambrian ==
The Paleobiology Database records no known occurrences of Precambrian fossils in Alabama.

== Paleozoic ==
- †Acrotreta
- †Agnostogonus
  - †Agnostogonus incognitus – or unidentified comparable form
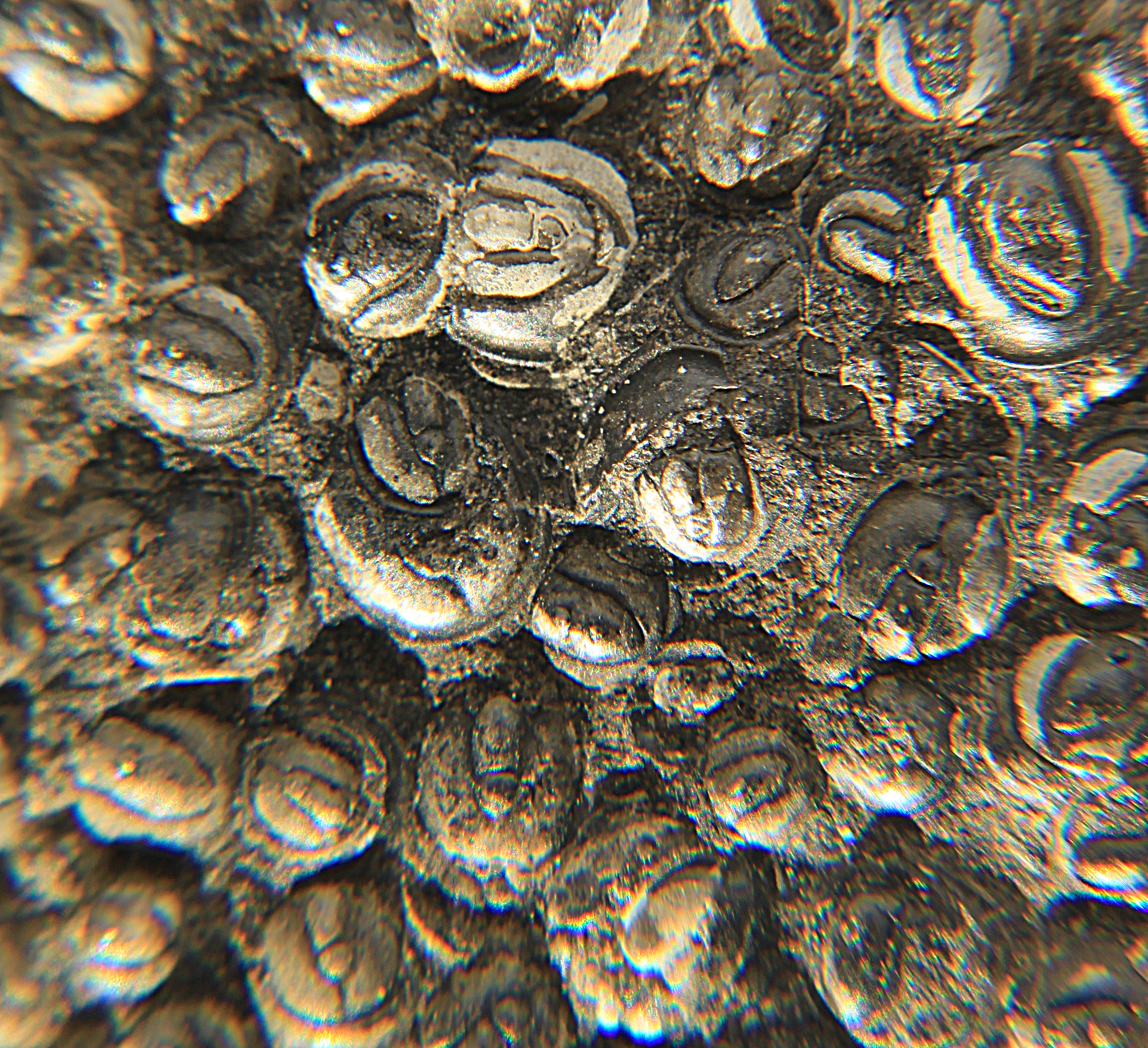
- Assemblage of fossils of the Cambrian trilobite Agnostus
  †Agnostus
- †Amiaspis
  - †Amiaspis erratica
- †Ankoura
  - †Ankoura triangularis
  - †Ankoura triangularus
- †Aphelaspis
  - †Aphelaspis haguei
- †Arapahoia
  - †Arapahoia spathulata
  - †Arapahoia spatulata
- †Arcifimbria
  - †Arcifimbria pahasapaensis
- †Arcifimbrin
  - †Arcifimbrin pahasapaensis
- †Arcuolimbus
  - †Arcuolimbus convexus
- †Billingsella
  - †Billingsella wichitaensis
- †Blountia
  - †Blountia arcuosa
  - †Blountia arion
  - †Blountia bristolensis
  - †Blountia eleanora
  - †Blountia janei
  - †Blountia nixonensis
- †Blountiella
  - †Blountiella alberta
  - †Blountiella cordilleria
- †Briscoia
  - †Briscoia angustilimba – or unidentified comparable form
  - †Briscoia dalyi
- †Bynumia
  - †Bynumia eumus
- †Bynumina
- †Camaraspis
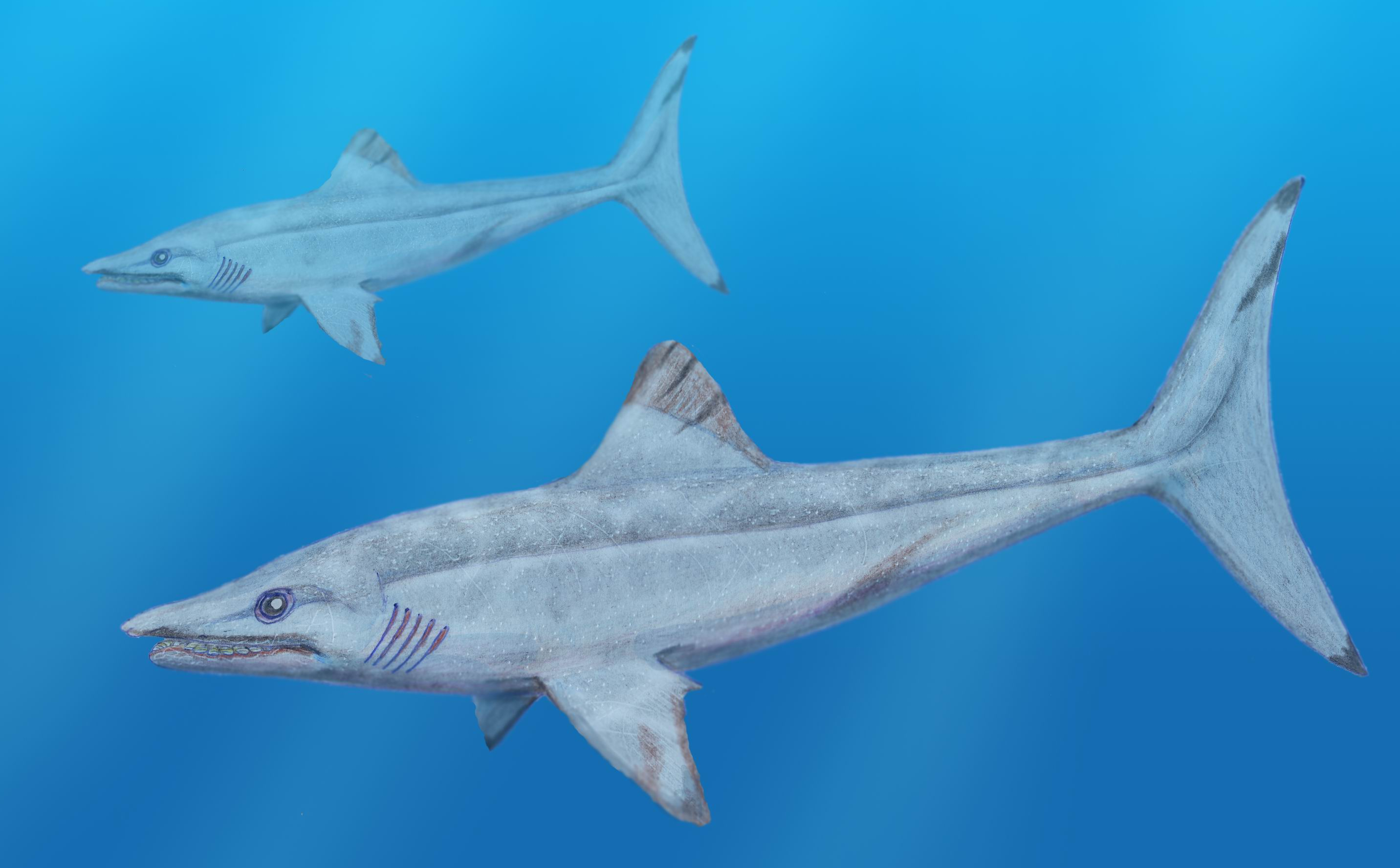
- Life restoration of the Carboniferous Chimaera relative Caseodus
  †Caseodus
  - †Caseodus eatoni – or unidentified related form
- †Cedaria
- †Cedarina
  - †Cedarina cordillerae
  - †Cedarina dakotaensis
  - †Cedarina dakotensis
- †Cheilocephalus
  - †Cheilocephalus brevilobus
- †Cladodus – or unidentified comparable form
- †Clelandia
  - †Clelandia typicalis
- †Coosella
  - †Coosella onusta
  - †Coosella perplexa
  - †Coosella prolifica
- †Coosia
  - †Coosia albertensis
  - †Coosia alethes
- †Coosina
  - †Coosina ariston
- †Crepicephalus
  - †Crepicephalus auratus
  - †Crepicephalus buttsimontanaenis
  - †Crepicephalus buttsimontanaensis
  - †Crepicephalus buttsimotanaensis
  - †Crepicephalus deadwoodensis
  - †Crepicephalus rectus
  - †Crepicephalus snowyenis
  - †Crepicephalus snowyensis
- †Cyrtogomphoceras
- †Dartonaspis
  - †Dartonaspis wichitaensis
  - †Dartonaspis witchitaensis
- †Deadwoodia
- †Dicellomus
- †Diestoceras
- †Dikelocephalus
  - †Dikelocephalus minnesotensis
- †Dresbachia
  - †Dresbachia amata
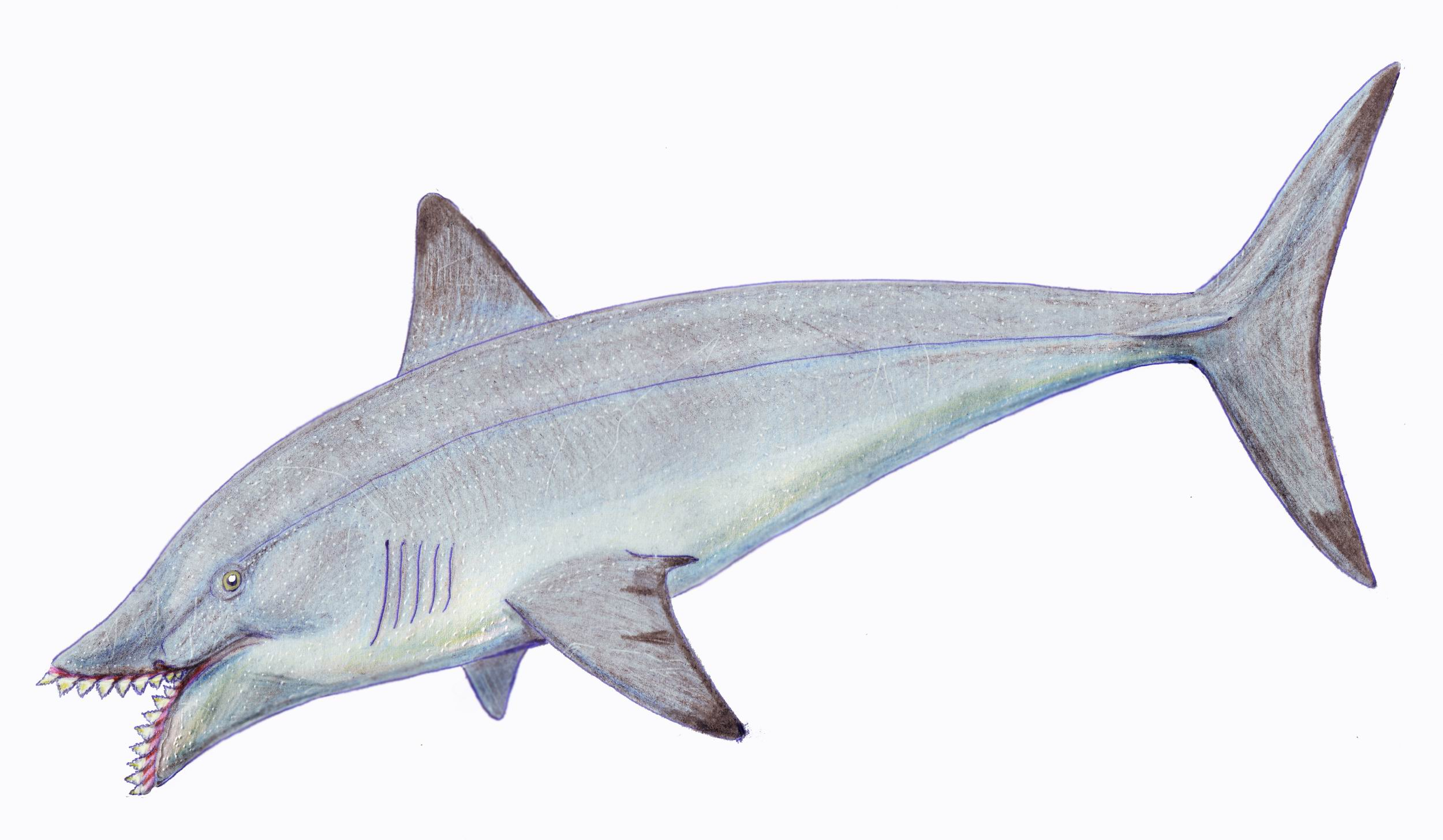
- Life restoration of the Late Devonian-Carboniferous Chimaera relative Edestus
  †Edestus
- †Ellipsocephaloides
  - †Ellipsocephaloides curtus
  - †Ellipsocephaloides monensis
  - †Ellipsocephaloides monsensis
- †Endoceras
- †Eoorthis
  - †Eoorthis indianola
  - †Eoorthis remnicha
- †Ephippiorthoceras
- †Glaphyraspis
  - †Glaphyraspis newtoni
  - †Glaphyraspis parva
- †Hadragnostus
  - †Hadragnostus modestus
- †Hardyoides
  - †Hardyoides tenerus
- †Holmesella
  - †Holmesella quadrata
- †Homagnostus
  - †Homagnostus obesus
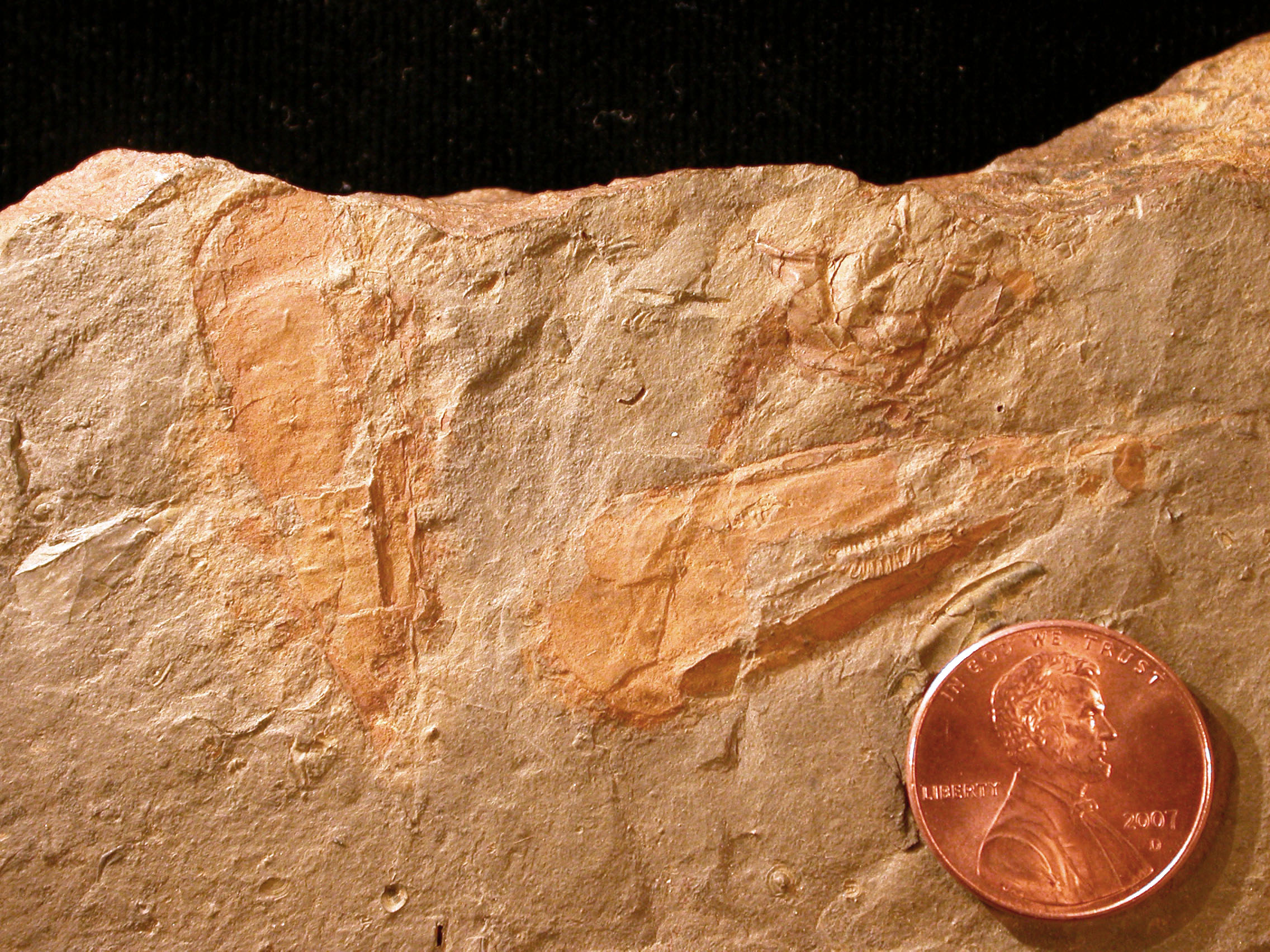
- Fossilized shells of the Cambrian-Permian brachiopod relative Hyolitha
  †Hyolithes
- †Hysteropleura
  - †Hysteropleura schucherti
- †Idahoia
  - †Idahoia serapio
  - †Idahoia wisconsensis
- †Idiomesus
  - †Idiomesus granti
  - †Idiomesus infimus
- †Illaenurus
  - †Illaenurus priscus
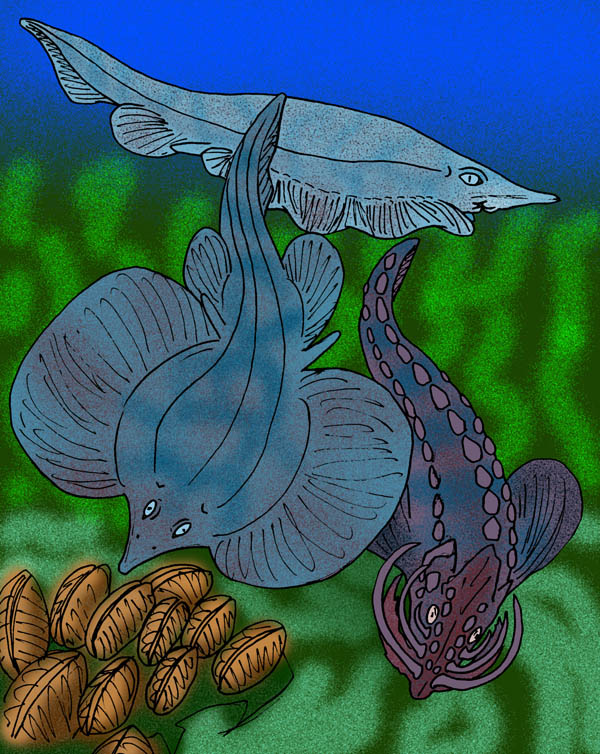
- Restoration of the Carboniferous-Permian ray-like cartilaginous fish Janassa (top and left)
  †Janassa
- †Kingstonia
  - †Kingstonia bealesoides
  - †Kingstonia scrinium
  - †Kingstonia spicata
  - †Kingstonia spicta
  - †Kingstonia walcotti
  - †Kingstonia walcottia
- †Komaspidella
  - †Komaspidella hata
  - †Komaspidella lata
- †Kormagnostus
  - †Kormagnostus beltensis
  - †Kormagnostus seclusus
- †Lambeoceras – tentative report
- †Lingulella
- †Lingulepis
- †Linnarssonella
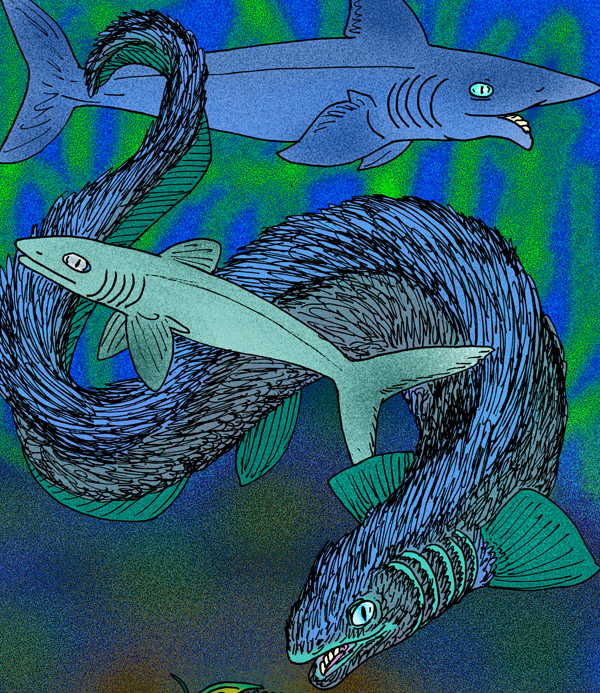
- Restoration of the Carboniferous-Early Triassic cartilaginous fish Listracanthus
  †Listracanthus
  - †Listracanthus hystrix
- †Litagnostus
  - †Litagnostus paralis
- †Llanoaspis
  - †Llanoaspis undulata
- †Meniscocorypphe
  - †Meniscocorypphe platycephala
- †Menomonia
  - †Menomonia prooculis
- †Meteoraspis
  - †Meteoraspis keeganensis
  - †Meteoraspis metra
  - †Meteoraspis robusta
- †Modocia
  - †Modocia centralis
  - †Modocia oweni
- †Monocheilus
  - †Monocheilus micros
  - †Monocheilus truncatus
- †Nahannagnostus
  - †Nahannagnostus nganasanicus
  - †Nahannagnostus nganasanious
- †Parabolinoides
  - †Parabolinoides contractus
  - †Parabolinoides granulosus
- †Pemphigaspis
  - †Pemphigaspis bullata
- †Petrodus
  - †Petrodus patelliformis
- †Plethopeltis
- †Prosaukia
  - †Prosaukia misa
- †Pseudagnostus
  - †Pseudagnostus douvillei
  - †Pseudagnostus josephus
- †Ptchaspis
  - †Ptchaspis striata
- †Ptychaspis
  - †Ptychaspis bullasa
  - †Ptychaspis miniscaensis
- †Ptychopleurites
  - †Ptychopleurites spinosa
- †Pugionicauda
  - †Pugionicauda paradoxa
- †Rasettia
  - †Rasettia capax
  - †Rasettia magna
- †Saukiella
  - †Saukiella pyrene
- †Spyroceras
- †Syspacheilus
- †Taenicephalus
  - †Taenicephalus nasutus
  - †Taenicephalus shumardi
- †Terranovella
  - †Terranovella dorsalis
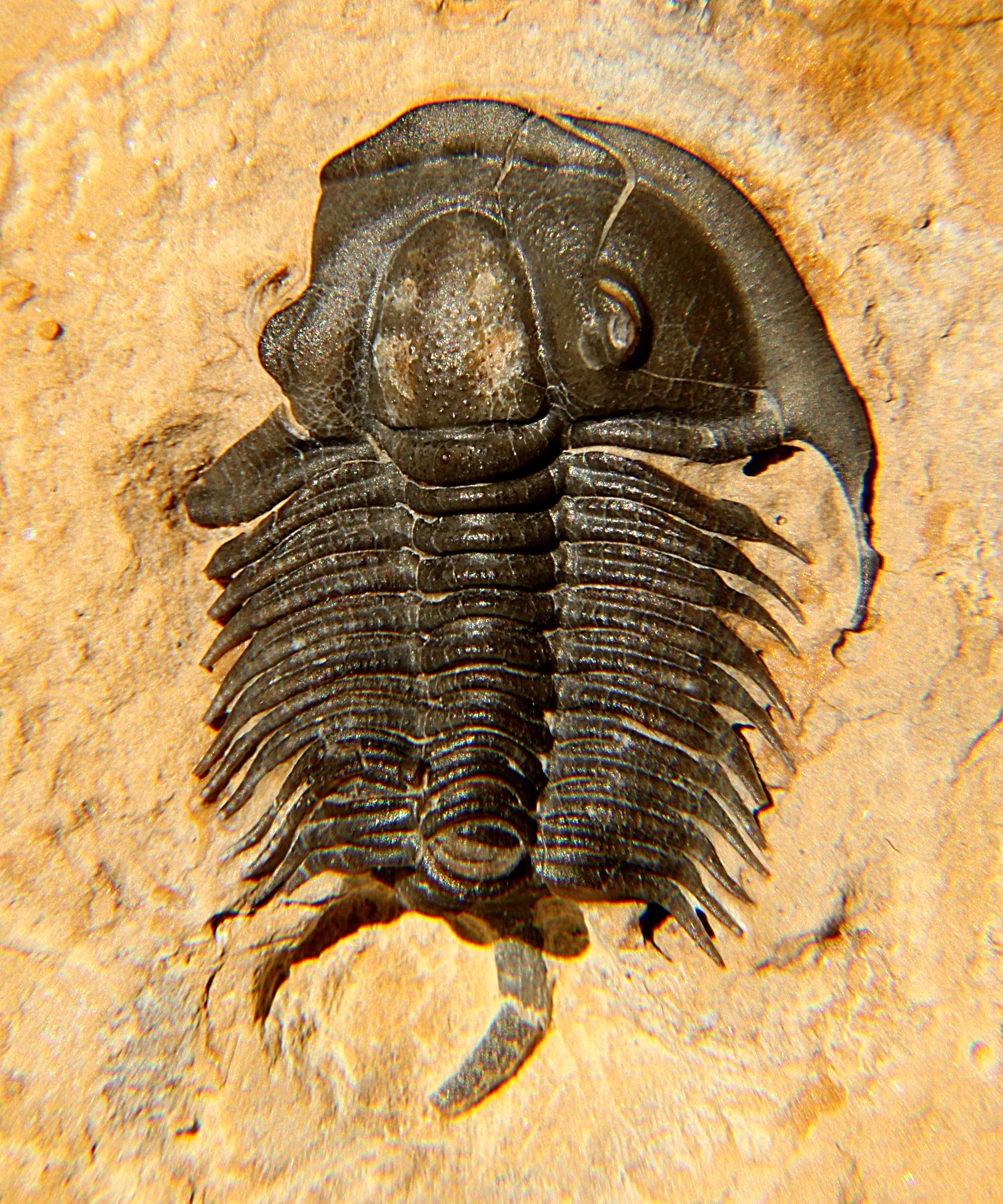
- Fossil of the Cambrian trilobite Tricrepicephalus
  †Tricrepicephalus
  - †Tricrepicephalus conia
  - †Tricrepicephalus coria
  - †Tricrepicephalus metra
  - †Tricrepicephalus tripunctatus
- †Tripteroceras
- †Uncaspis
  - †Uncaspis limbata
  - †Uncaspis unca
- †Welleraspis
  - †Welleraspis group#1 – informal
  - †Welleraspis group#2 – informal
- †Westonoceras
- †Wilsonoceras
- †Winnipegoceras

== Mesozoic ==
=== Selected Mesozoic taxa of South Dakota ===
- Acipenser – or unidentified comparable form
- †Actinocamax
- †Adocus
- †Agerostrea
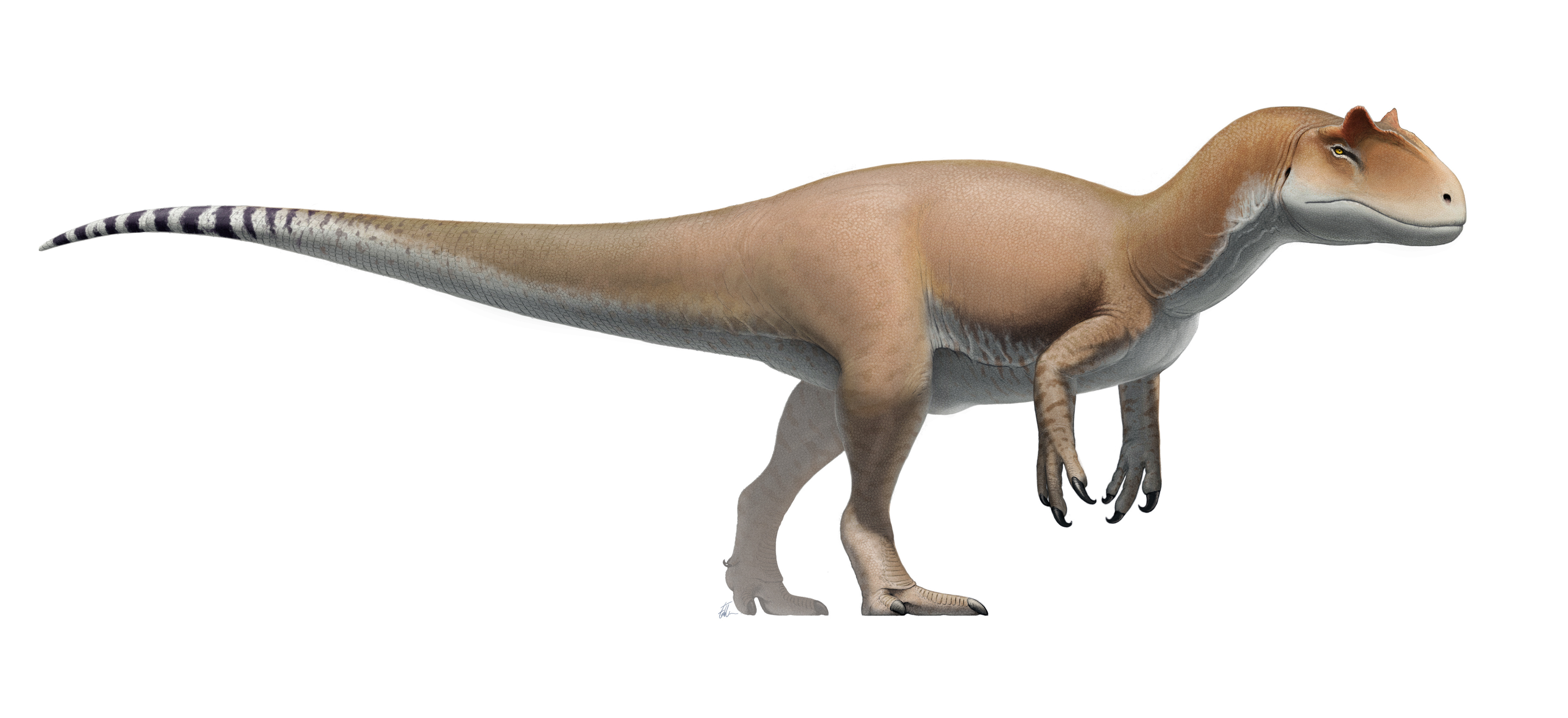
- Restoration of the Late Jurassic theropod dinosaur Allosaurus
  †Allosaurus
- †Alphadon
  - †Alphadon marshi
- †Anatotitan
  - †Anatotitan copei
- †Anomia
- †Anzu – type locality for genus
  - †Anzu wyliei – type locality for species
- †Apatosaurus
- †Araucarioxylon
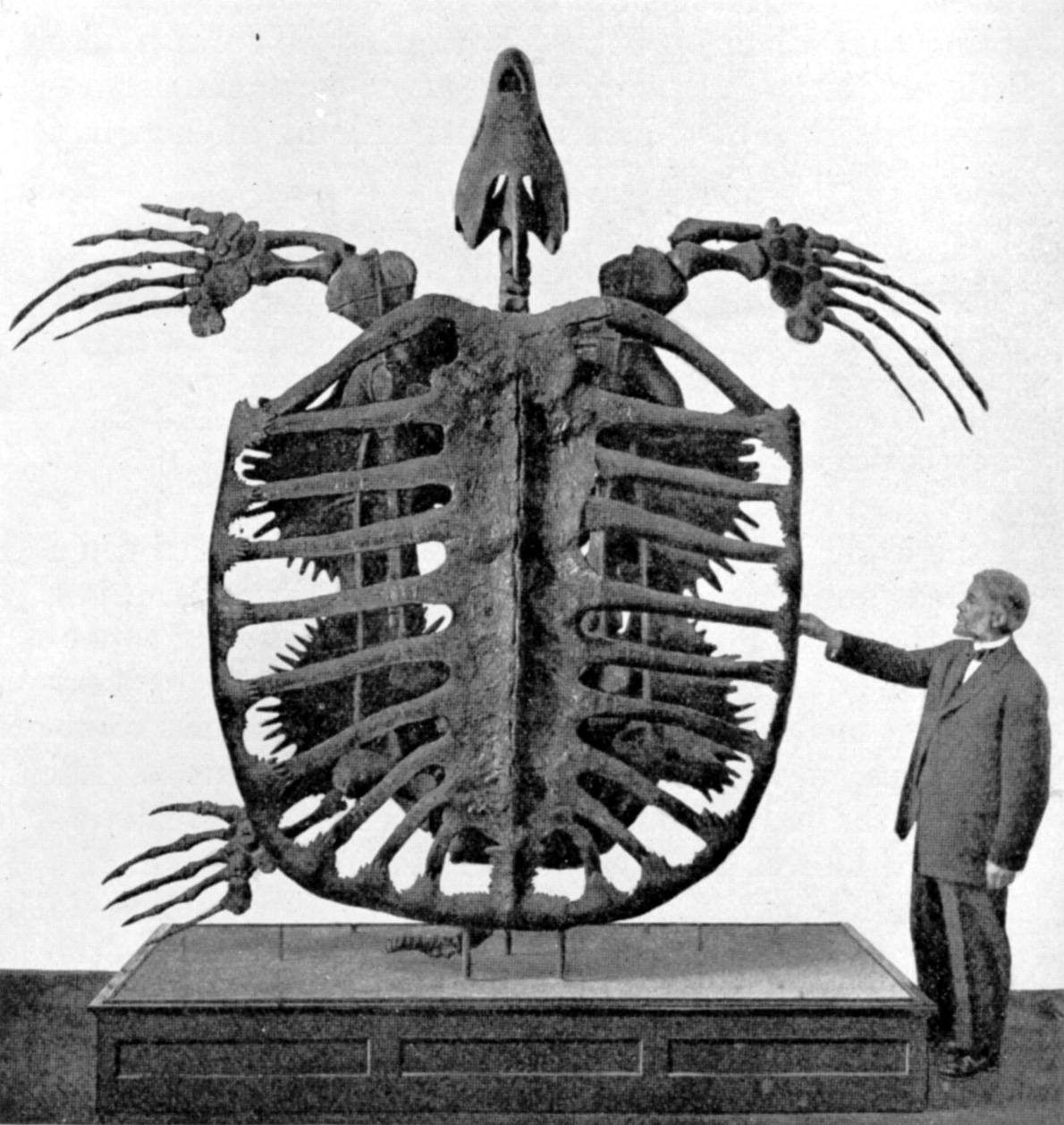
- Mounted fossilized skeleton of the Late Cretaceous sea turtle Archelon
  †Archelon – type locality for genus
  - †Archelon ischyros – type locality for species
- †Artocarpus – report made of unidentified related form or using admittedly obsolete nomenclature
- Aspideretes
- †Asplenium
- †Baculites
  - †Baculites clinolobatus
  - †Baculites compressus
  - †Baculites grandis
  - †Baculites larsoni
  - †Baculites ovatus
  - †Baculites yokoyamai
- †Bananogmius
- †Baptornis
  - †Baptornis varneri – type locality for species
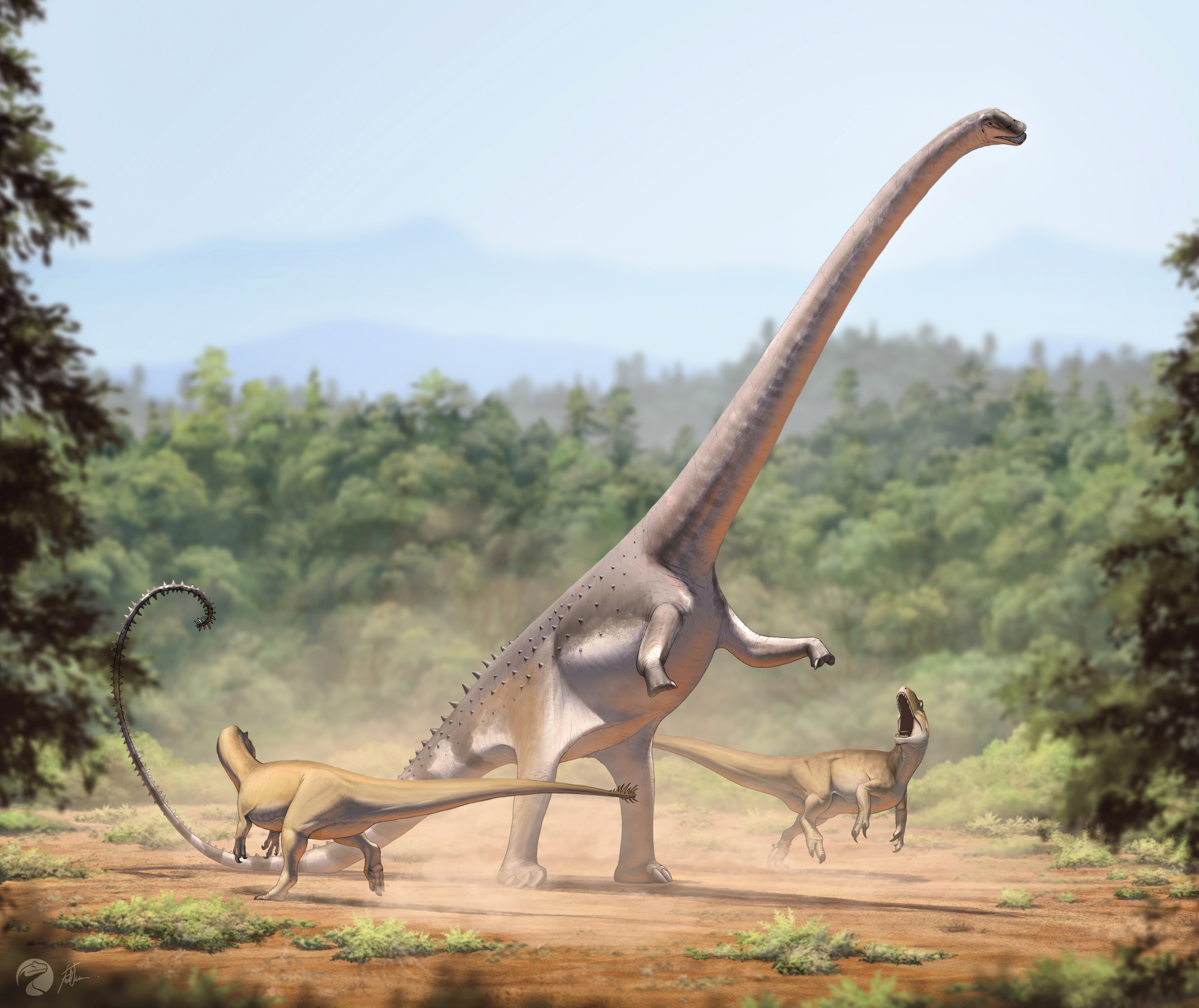
- Restoration of the Late Jurassic sauropod dinosaur Barosaurus rearing to defend itself against a pair of the theropod Allosaurus
  †Barosaurus – type locality for genus
  - †Barosaurus lentus – type locality for species
- †Basilemys
- †Belemnitella
  - †Belemnitella bulbosa
- Beryx – or unidentified related form
- †Bolodon
  - †Bolodon hydei – type locality for species
- †Borealosuchus
  - †Borealosuchus sternbergii
- Brachidontes
- †Brachychampsa
  - †Brachychampsa montana
- †Brodavis
  - †Brodavis baileyi – type locality for species
- †Caenagnathus
- †Calycoceras
  - †Calycoceras boreale – type locality for species
  - †Calycoceras dromense – or unidentified comparable form
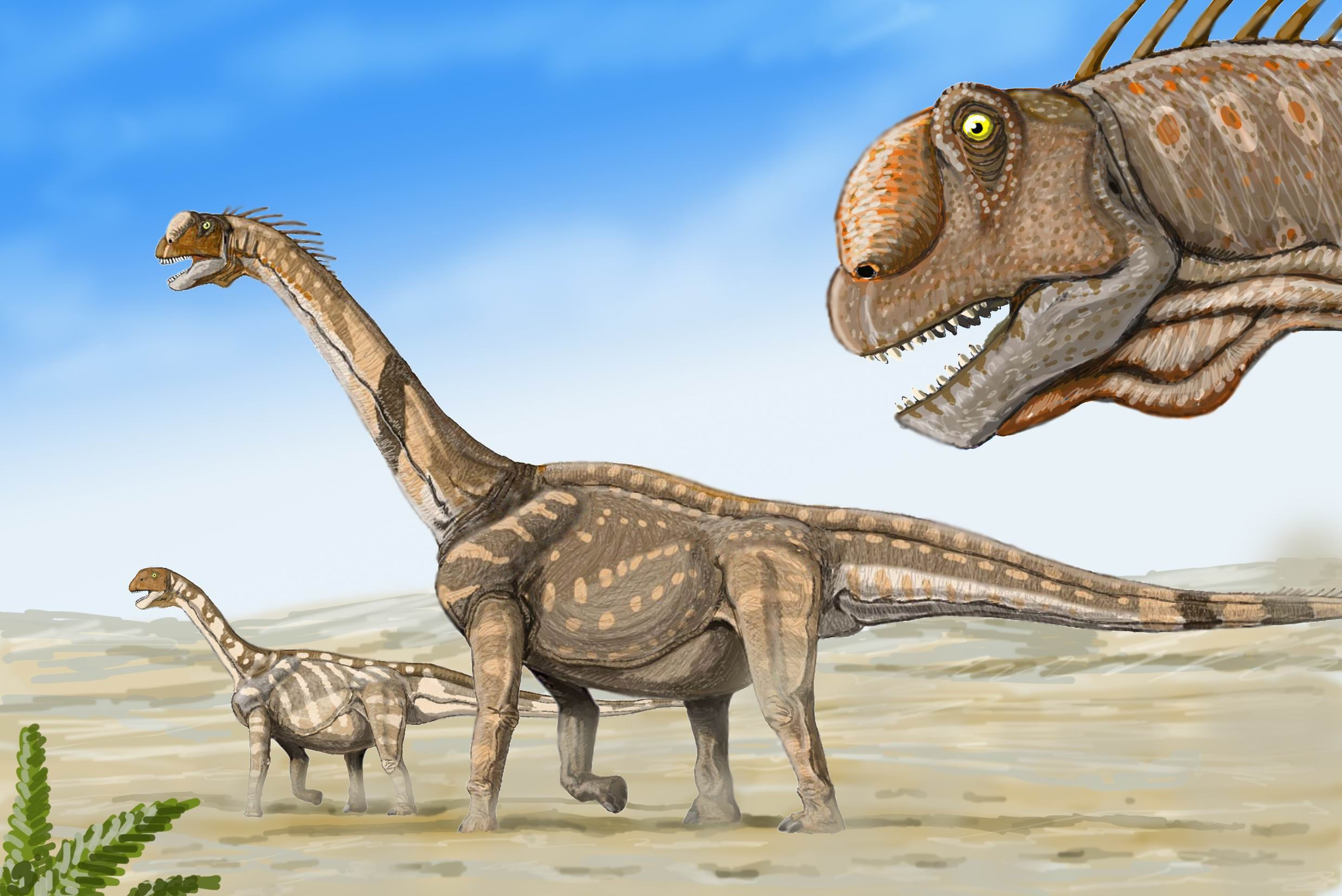
- Life restoration of a herd of the Late Jurassic sauropod dinosaur Camarasaurus
  †Camarasaurus
- Campeloma
- †Caturus
- †Champsosaurus
- †Cimexomys
- †Cimolodon
  - †Cimolodon nitidus
- †Cimolomys
  - †Cimolomys gracilis
- †Claosaurus
  - †Claosaurus affinis – type locality for species
- †Clidastes
  - †Clidastes propython
- †Cocculus
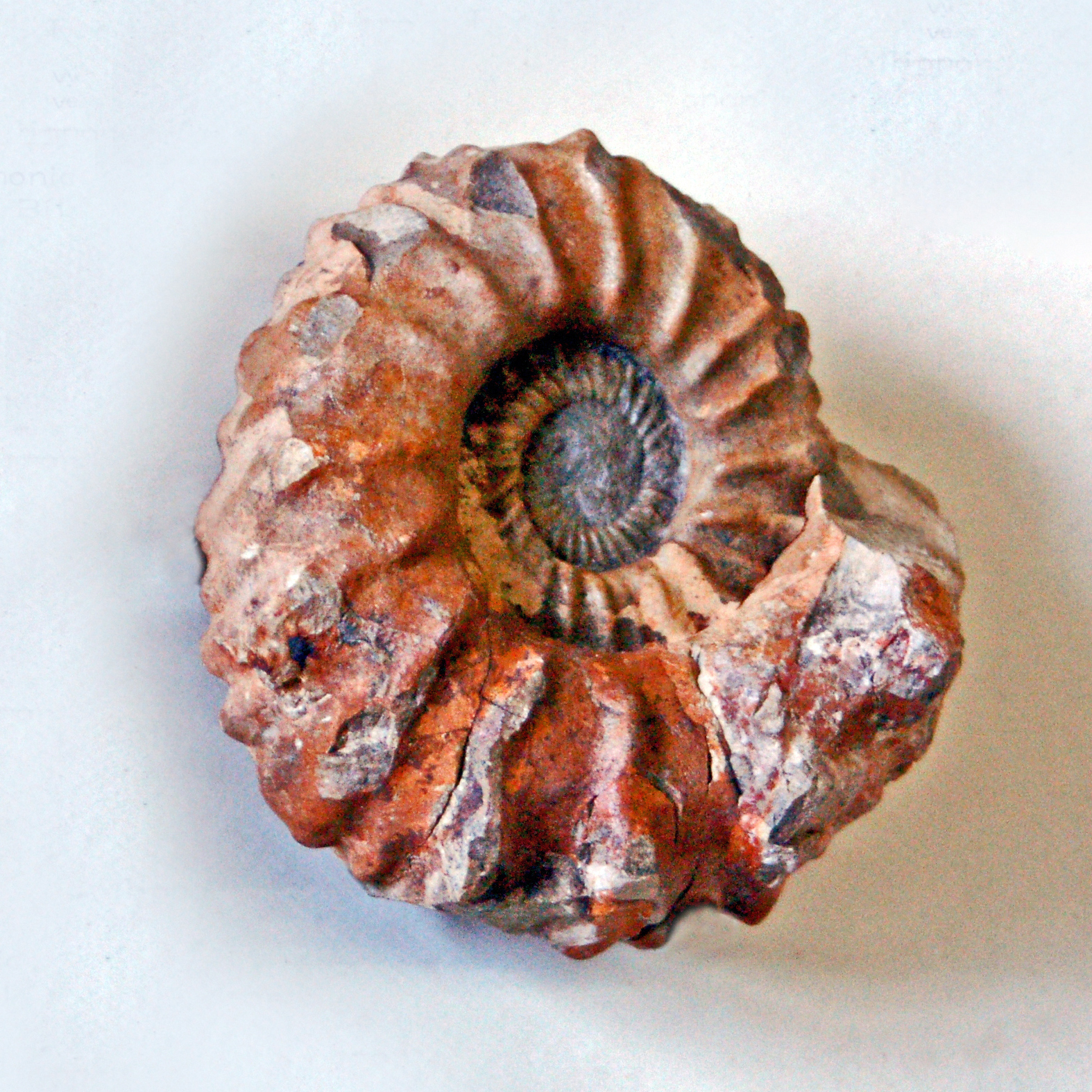
- Fossilized shell of the Late Cretaceous ammonoid Collignoniceras
  †Collignoniceras
  - †Collignoniceras collisniger – type locality for species
  - †Collignoniceras jorgenseni – type locality for species
  - †Collignoniceras percarinatum
  - †Collignoniceras praecox
  - †Collignoniceras vermilionense
  - †Collignoniceras woolgari
  - †Collignoniceras woollgari
- †Compsemys
- Corbula
- †Corbulamella
- †Crenella
  - †Crenella elegantula
- †Cretolamna
  - †Cretolamna appendiculata
- †Cteniogenys
- Cucullaea
- †Cuspidaria
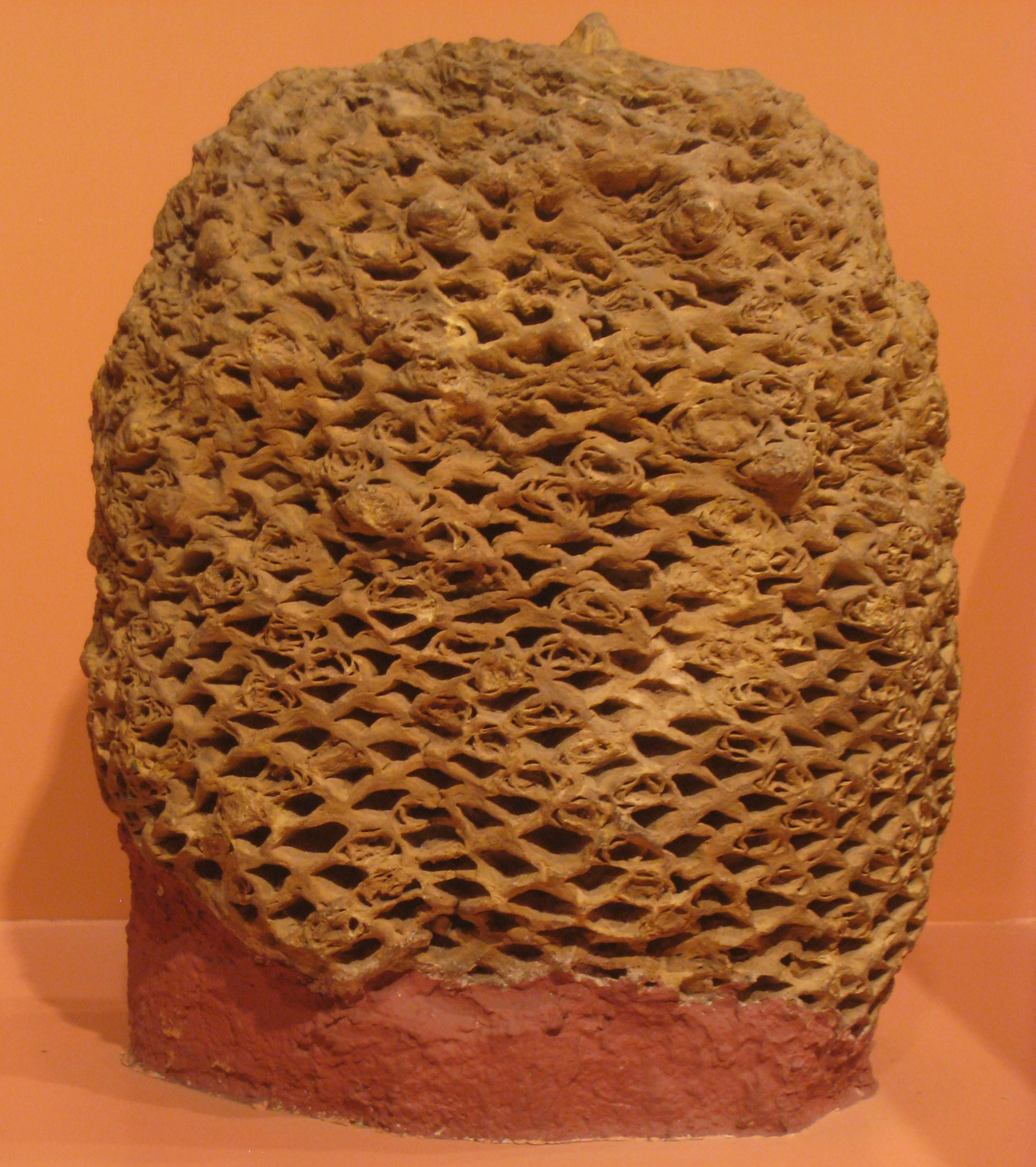
- Fossil of the Jurassic-Cretaceous cycad relative Cycadeoidea
  †Cycadeoidea
  - †Cycadeoidea aspera – type locality for species
  - †Cycadeoidea cicatricula – type locality for species
  - †Cycadeoidea colei – type locality for species
  - †Cycadeoidea colossalis – type locality for species
  - †Cycadeoidea dacotensis
  - †Cycadeoidea excelsa – type locality for species
  - †Cycadeoidea formosa – type locality for species
  - †Cycadeoidea furcata – type locality for species
  - †Cycadeoidea ingens – type locality for species
  - †Cycadeoidea insolita – type locality for species
  - †Cycadeoidea jenneyana
  - †Cycadeoidea Jenneyana
  - †Cycadeoidea marshiana – type locality for species
  - †Cycadeoidea mcbridei – type locality for species
  - †Cycadeoidea McBridei – type locality for species
  - †Cycadeoidea minnekahtensis – type locality for species
  - †Cycadeoidea nana – type locality for species
  - †Cycadeoidea occidentalis – type locality for species
  - †Cycadeoidea paynei – type locality for species
  - †Cycadeoidea pulcherrima – type locality for species
  - †Cycadeoidea stillwelli – type locality for species
  - †Cycadeoidea turrita – type locality for species
  - †Cycadeoidea Wellsii – type locality for species
- †Dakotadon
  - †Dakotadon lakotaensis
- †Dakotaraptor – type locality for genus
  - †Dakotaraptor steini – type locality for species
- †Desmatochelys
- †Didelphodon
- †Diplodocus
- †Discoscaphites
  - †Discoscaphites conradi
  - †Discoscaphites gulosus
  - †Discoscaphites rossi – type locality for species
- †Dolichorhynchops
  - †Dolichorhynchops osborni
- †Edmontonia
  - †Edmontonia longiceps
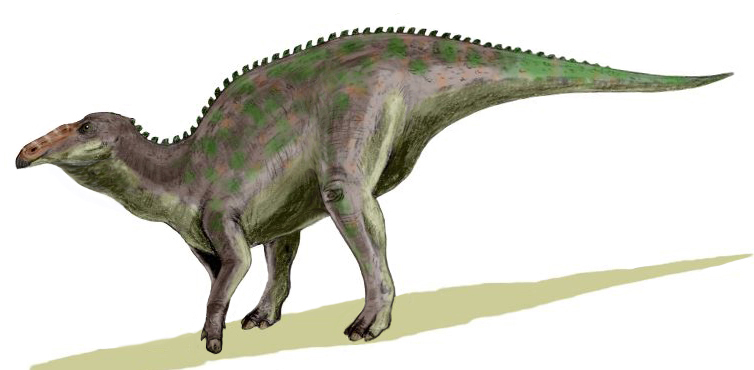
- Life restoration of the Late Cretaceous duck-billed dinosaur Edmontosaurus annectens
  †Edmontosaurus
- †Elasmosaurus
  - †Elasmosaurus intermedius – type locality for species
- †Enchodus
- †Eubostrychoceras
- †Eucalycoceras
- †Eutrephoceras
- †Geosternbergia
  - †Geosternbergia maiseyi – type locality for species
- Gleichenia
- †Globidens
  - †Globidens alabamensis
  - †Globidens dakotensis – type locality for species
  - †Globidens schurmanni – type locality for species
- †Glyptops
- Glyptostrobus
  - †Glyptostrobus europaeus
- †Gorgosaurus
- †Hainosaurus
- †Hamites
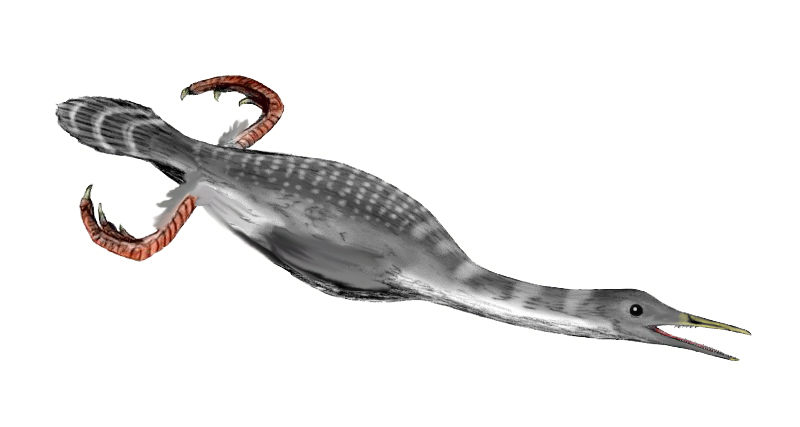
- Life restoration of the Late Cretaceous toothed bird Hesperornis
  †Hesperornis
  - †Hesperornis regalis – or unidentified comparable form
- Hiatella – tentative report
- †Hoplitosaurus
  - †Hoplitosaurus marshi – type locality for species
- †Hoploparia
- †Hoploscaphites
  - †Hoploscaphites comprimus
  - †Hoploscaphites melloi – type locality for species
  - †Hoploscaphites nicolletii
- †Hulettia
- †Hypsilophodon
  - †Hypsilophodon wielandi – type locality for species
- †Ichthyodectes
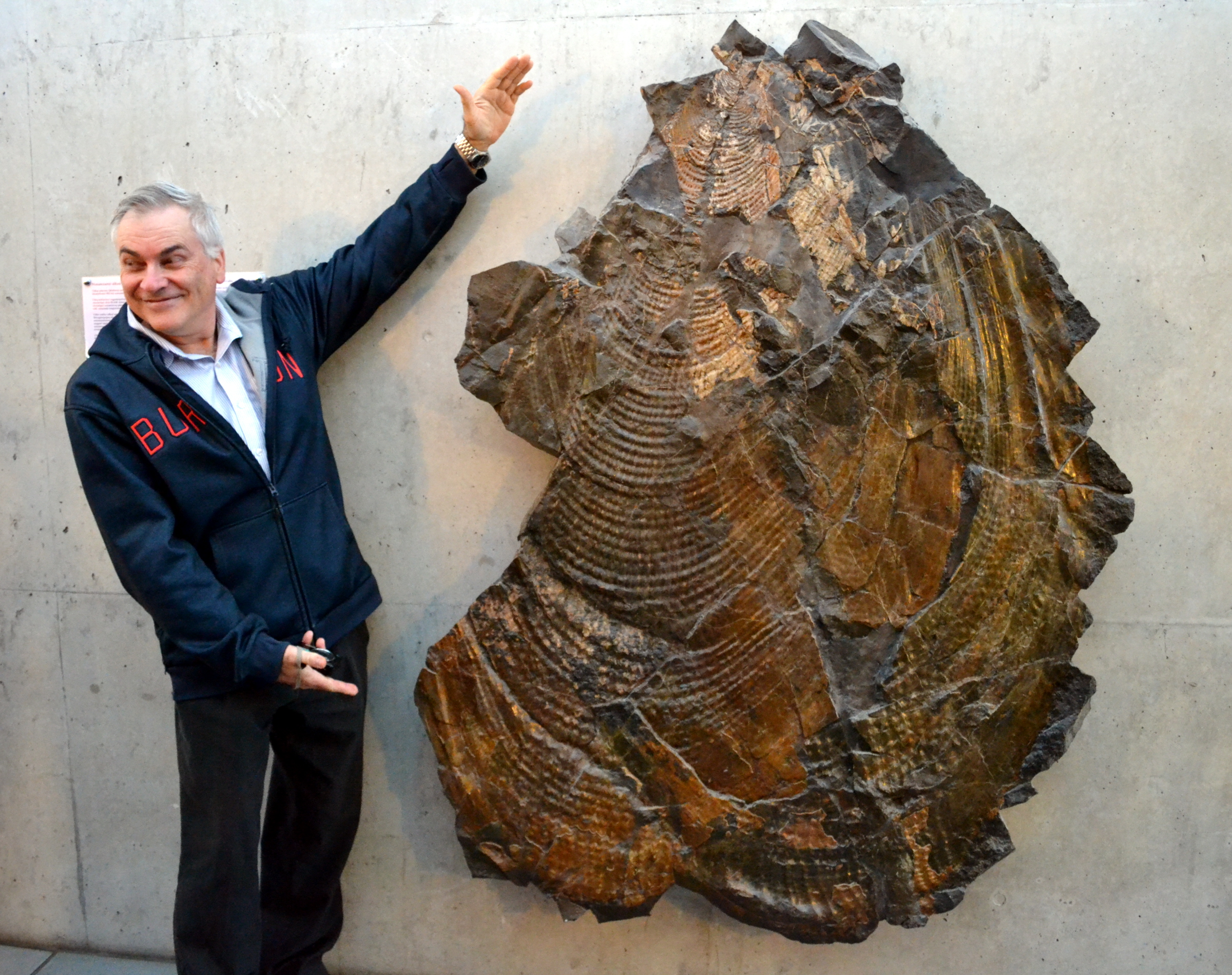
- Fossilized shell of the Early Jurassic-Late Cretaceous marine bivalve Inoceramus with a human indicating its size
  †Inoceramus
  - †Inoceramus apicalis
  - †Inoceramus ginterensis
  - †Inoceramus tenuis – or unidentified related form
  - †Inoceramus tenuistriatus – tentative report
- †Ischyodus
  - †Ischyodus rayhaasi
- Isurus
- †Jeletzkytes
  - †Jeletzkytes dorfi
  - †Jeletzkytes nebrascensis
  - †Jeletzkytes spedeni – type locality for species
- Lamna
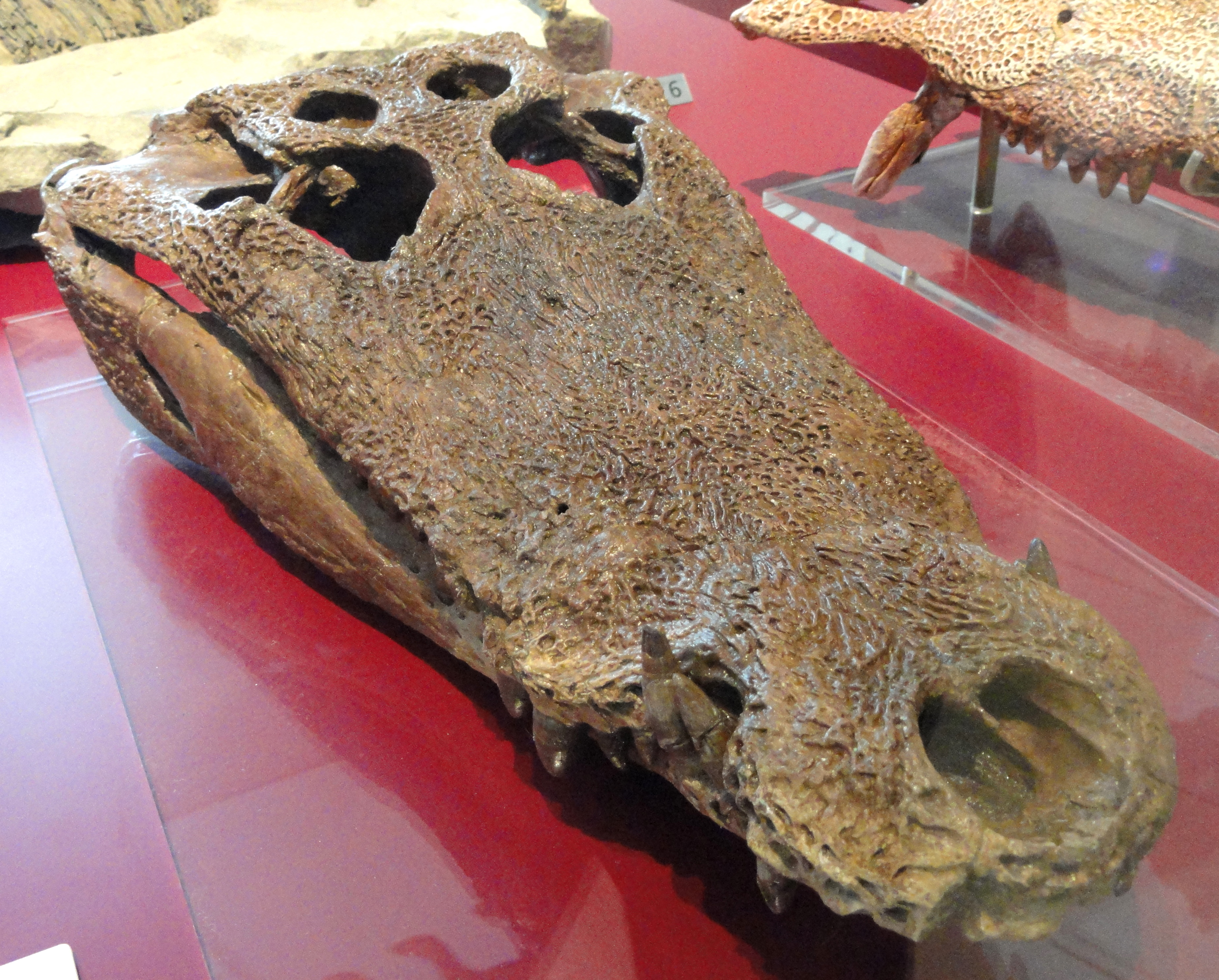
- Fossilized skull of the Late Cretaceous alligator relative Leidyosuchus
  †Leidyosuchus
- †Lemnaceae
- †Lepidotes – tentative report
- Lepisosteus
- †Leptalestes
  - †Leptalestes cooki
  - †Leptalestes krejcii
- †Lucina – tentative report
- †Martinectes
  - †Martinectes bonneri
- †Melvius
- †Meniscoessus
  - †Meniscoessus robustus
- †Mesodma
  - †Mesodma formosa
  - †Mesodma hensleighi
  - †Mesodma thompsoni
- †Modiolus
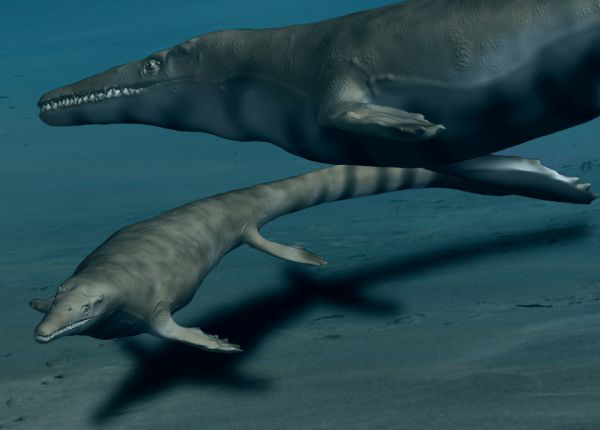
- Life restoration of two of the Late Cretaceous Mosasaurus
  †Mosasaurus
  - †Mosasaurus missouriensis – type locality for species
- †Myledaphus
  - †Myledaphus bipartitus
- †Nelumbo
- †Neocardioceras
  - †Neocardioceras transiens – type locality for species
- Nucula
  - †Nucula percrassa
- †Ophiomorpha
- †Ornithomimus
- †Osmakasaurus
  - †Osmakasaurus depressus – type locality for species
- Ostrea
- †Otoscaphites
- †Oxytoma
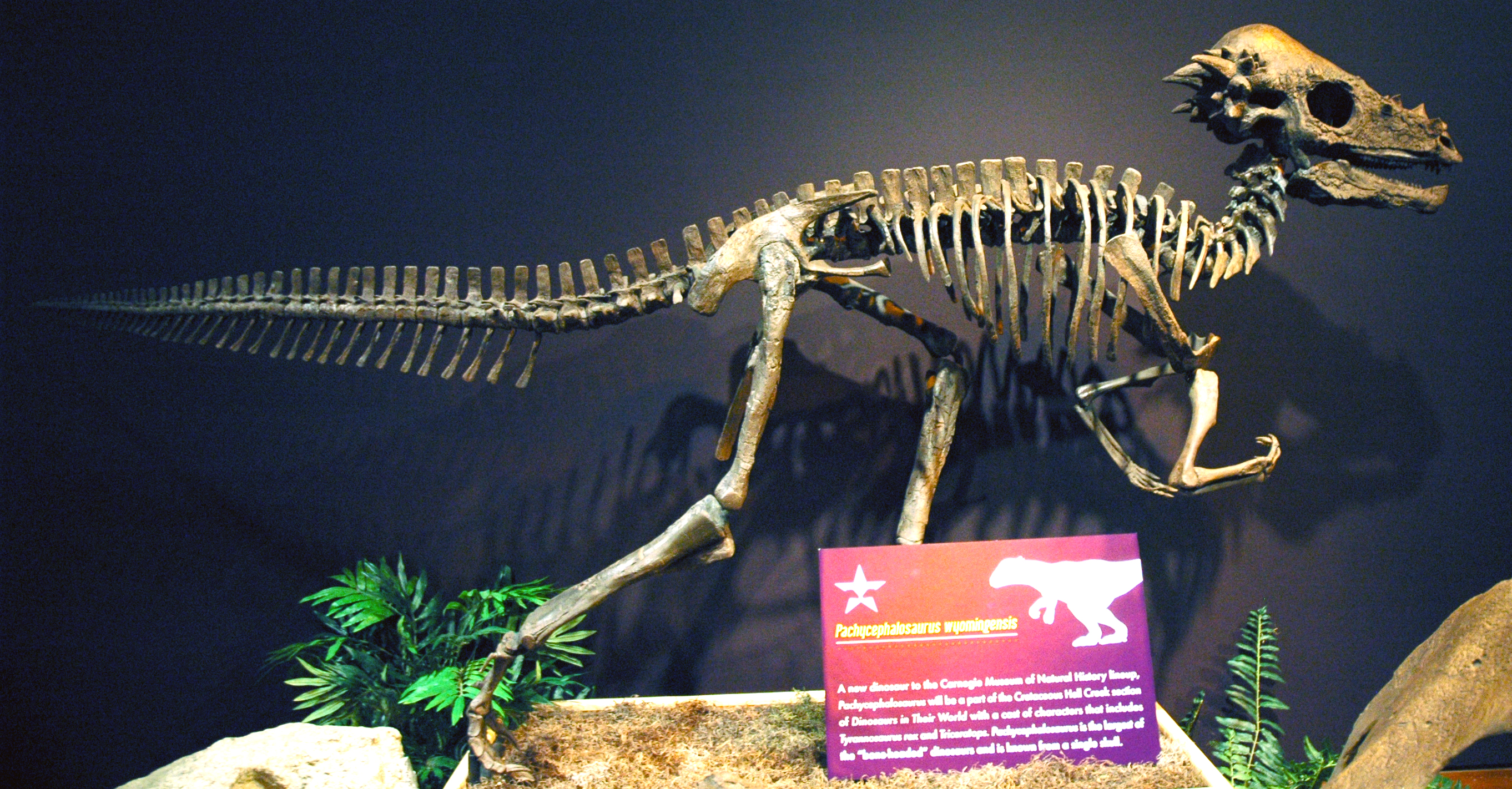
- Fossilized skeleton of the Late Cretaceous dome-headed dinosaur Pachycephalosaurus
  †Pachycephalosaurus – type locality for genus
  - †Pachycephalosaurus wyomingensis – type locality for species
- †Pachyrhizodus
- †Pahasapasaurus – type locality for genus
  - †Pahasapasaurus haasi – type locality for species
- †Palmoxylon
- Panopea
- †Paronychodon
  - †Paronychodon lacustris
- Pholadomya
- †Pistia – report made of unidentified related form or using admittedly obsolete nomenclature
- †Placenticeras
  - †Placenticeras pseudoplacenta
- Platanus
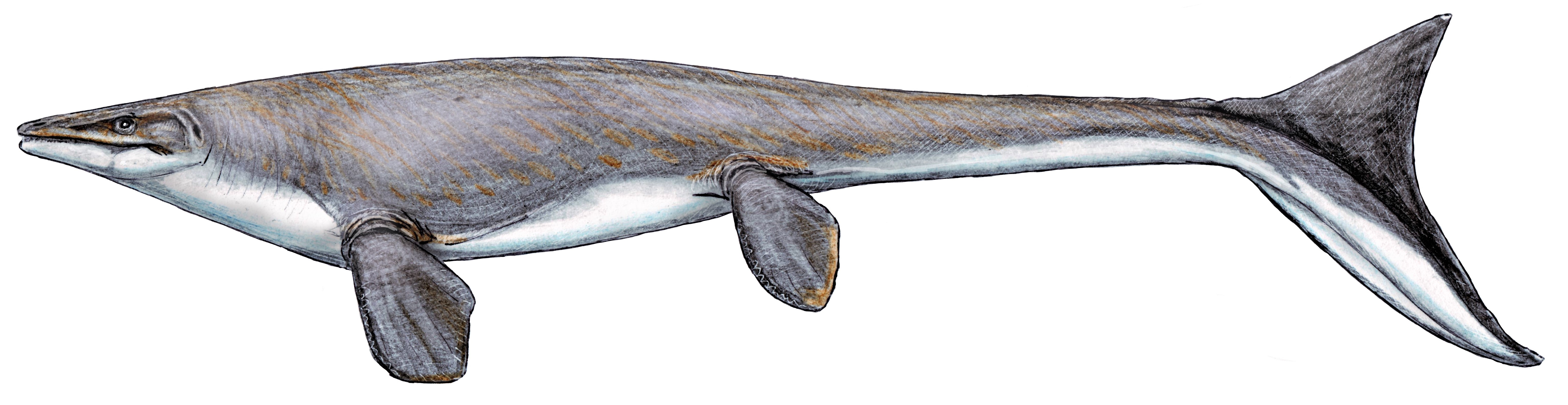
- Life restoration of the Late Cretaceous mosasaur Platecarpus
  †Platecarpus
  - †Platecarpus somenensis – or unidentified comparable form
  - †Platecarpus tympaniticus
- †Plesiobaena
- †Plioplatecarpus
  - †Plioplatecarpus primaevus – type locality for species
- †Prognathodon
  - †Prognathodon overtoni – type locality for species
- †Proplacenticeras
- †Protocardia
- †Protosphyraena
- †Protostega
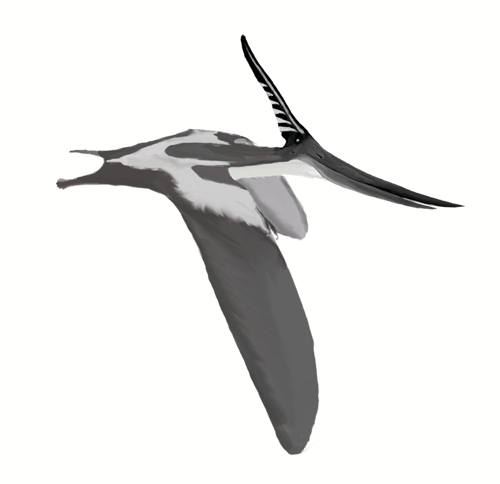
- Life restoration of the Late Cretaceous pterosaur Pteranodon
  †Pteranodon
  - †Pteranodon longiceps
- †Ptychodus
  - †Ptychodus occidentalis
- Quercus
- †Rhamnus
- †Richardoestesia
  - †Richardoestesia isosceles
- Sassafras
- †Scaphites
- †Sequoia
- Solemya
- Sphaerium
- †Sphenobaiera
- †Sphenodiscus
  - †Sphenodiscus beecheri – tentative report
  - †Sphenodiscus lobatus
  - †Sphenodiscus pleurisepta
- Squalicorax
  - †Squalicorax falcatus
- Squalus
- Animated life restoration of the Late Cretaceous plesiosaur Styxosaurus
  †Styxosaurus
  - †Styxosaurus browni
  - †Styxosaurus snowii – type locality for species
- †Tatankaceratops – type locality for genus
  - †Tatankaceratops sacrisonorum – type locality for species
- Taxodium
- †Thescelosaurus
  - †Thescelosaurus neglectus
- †Thespesius – type locality for genus
  - †Thespesius occidentalis – type locality for species
- †Torosaurus
  - †Torosaurus latus
- †Toxochelys
  - †Toxochelys latiremis
- †Trachodon
- †Tragodesmoceras
  - †Tragodesmoceras carlilense
  - †Tragodesmoceras carlilensis
- †Triceratops
  - †Triceratops horridus
- †Tylosaurus
  - †Tylosaurus proriger
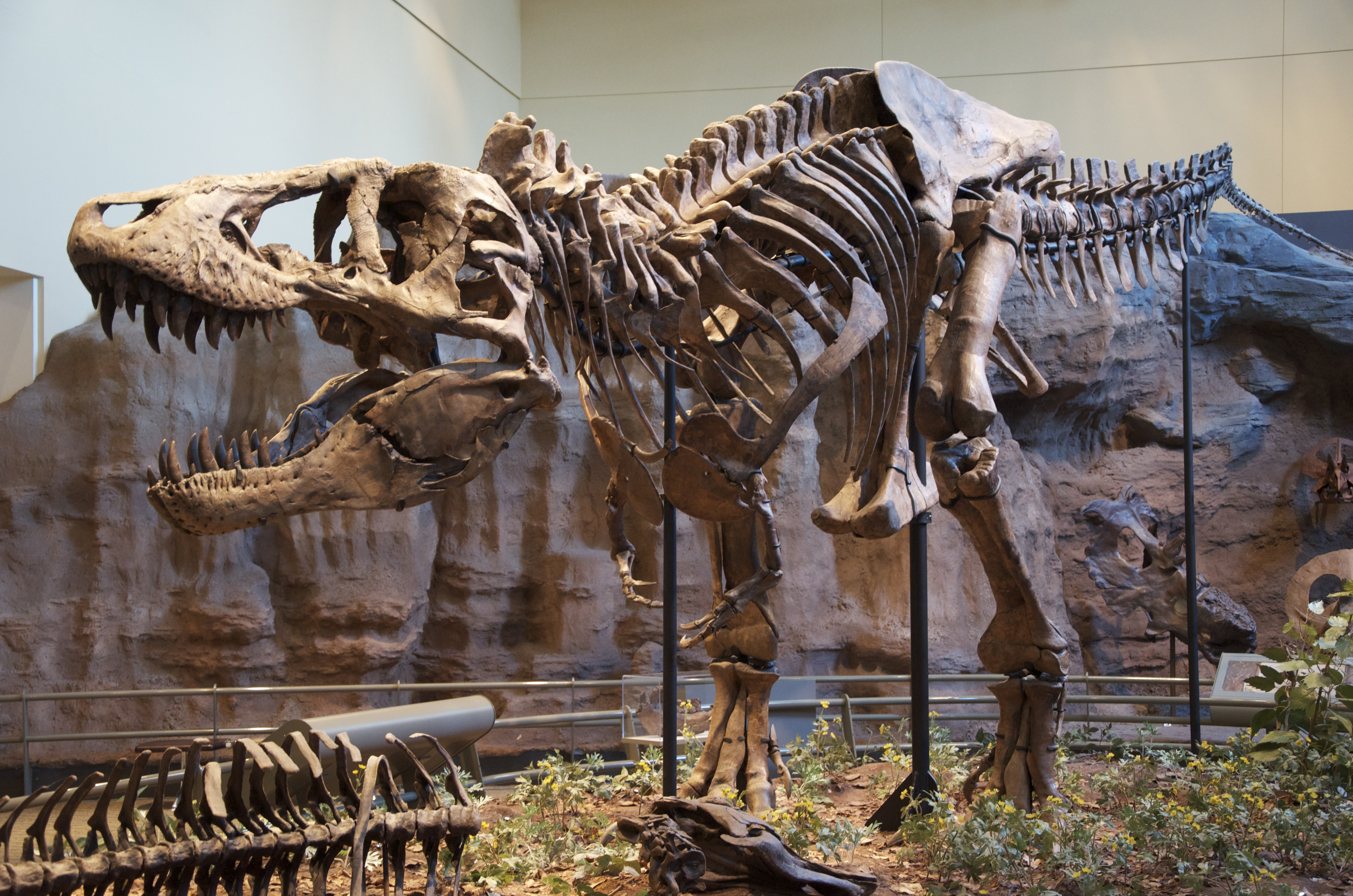
- Fossilized skeleton of the Late Cretaceous tyrannosaur Tyrannosaurus
  †Tyrannosaurus
  - †Tyrannosaurus rex
- Viviparus
- †Yezoites
- Yoldia
- Ziziphus

== Cenozoic ==
=== Selected Cenozoic taxa of South Dakota ===
- †Aelurodon
- †Aepycamelus
- †Agnotocastor
- †Agriochoerus
- Alligator
  - †Alligator prenasalis – type locality for species
- †Ambystoma
  - †Ambystoma tigrinum
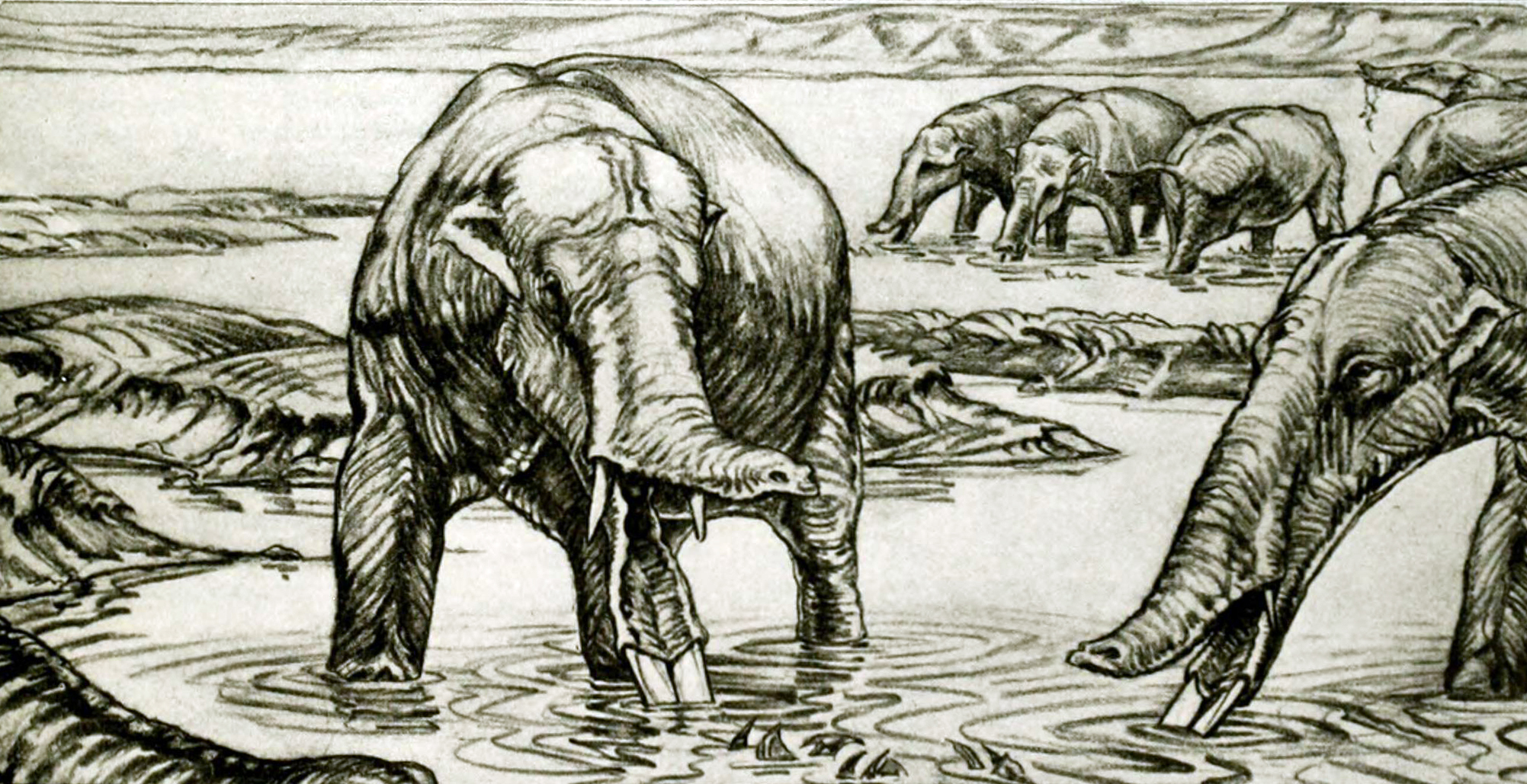
- Life restoration of the Miocene elephant relative Amebelodon. Margret Flinsch (1932).
  †Amebelodon
- †Ampelopsis
- †Amphechinus
- †Anchitherium
- Antilocapra
  - †Antilocapra americana
- Apalone
- †Aphelops
- †Archaeocyon
- †Archaeohippus
- †Archaeotherium
- †Arctodus
  - †Arctodus simus
- †Arctonasua
- Azolla
- †Barbourofelis
  - †Barbourofelis whitfordi
- †Bathornis
  - †Bathornis veredus
- Bison
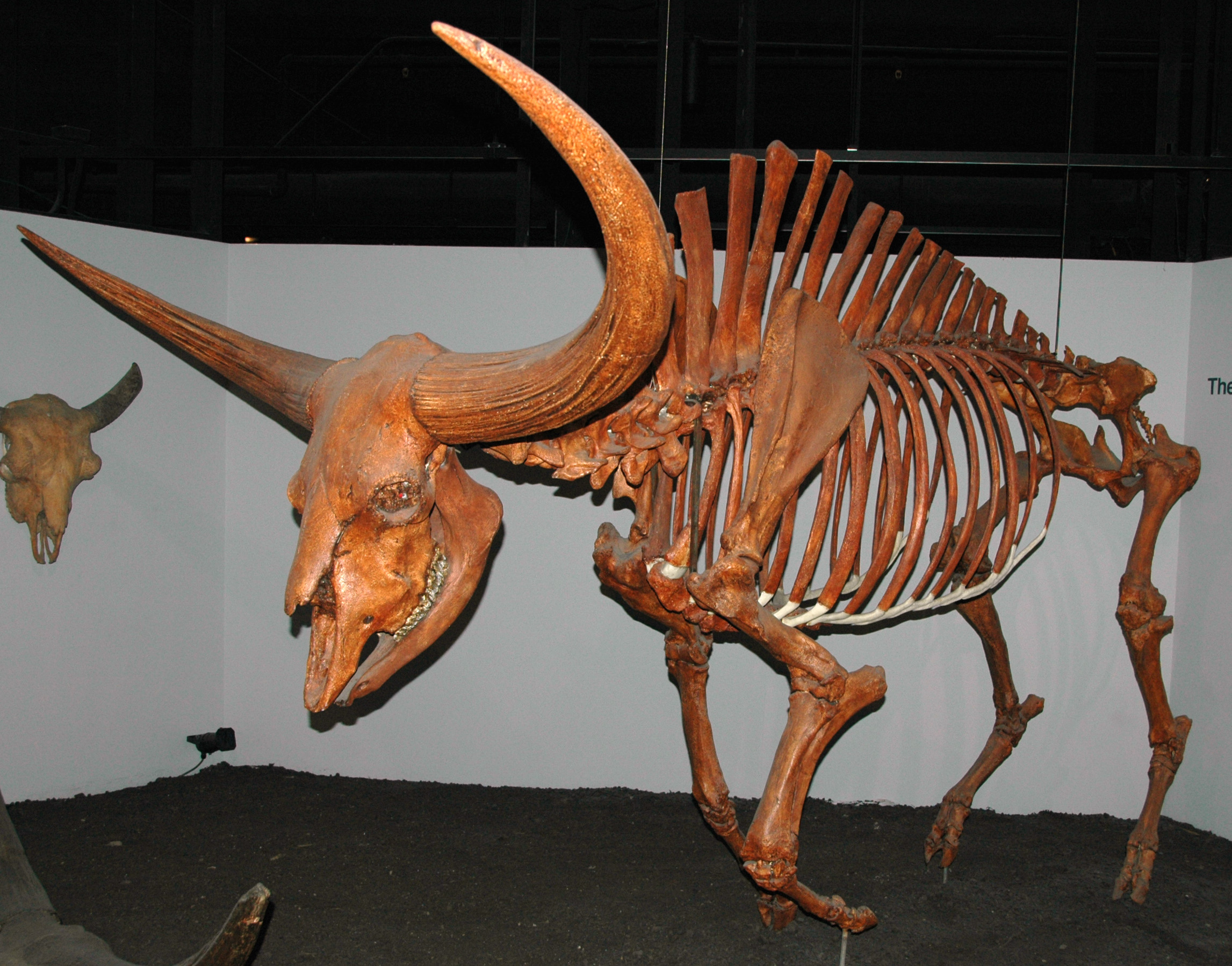
  - Mounted fossilized skeleton of the Pleistocene Bison latifrons, or long-horned bison
    †Bison latifrons
- Blarina
  - †Blarina carolinensis – or unidentified comparable form
- †Bothriodon
- †Brachypsalis
- †Brachyrhynchocyon
- †Brontops
- Bufo
  - †Bufo woodhousei
- Buteo
- †Calippus
- †Camelops
- Canis
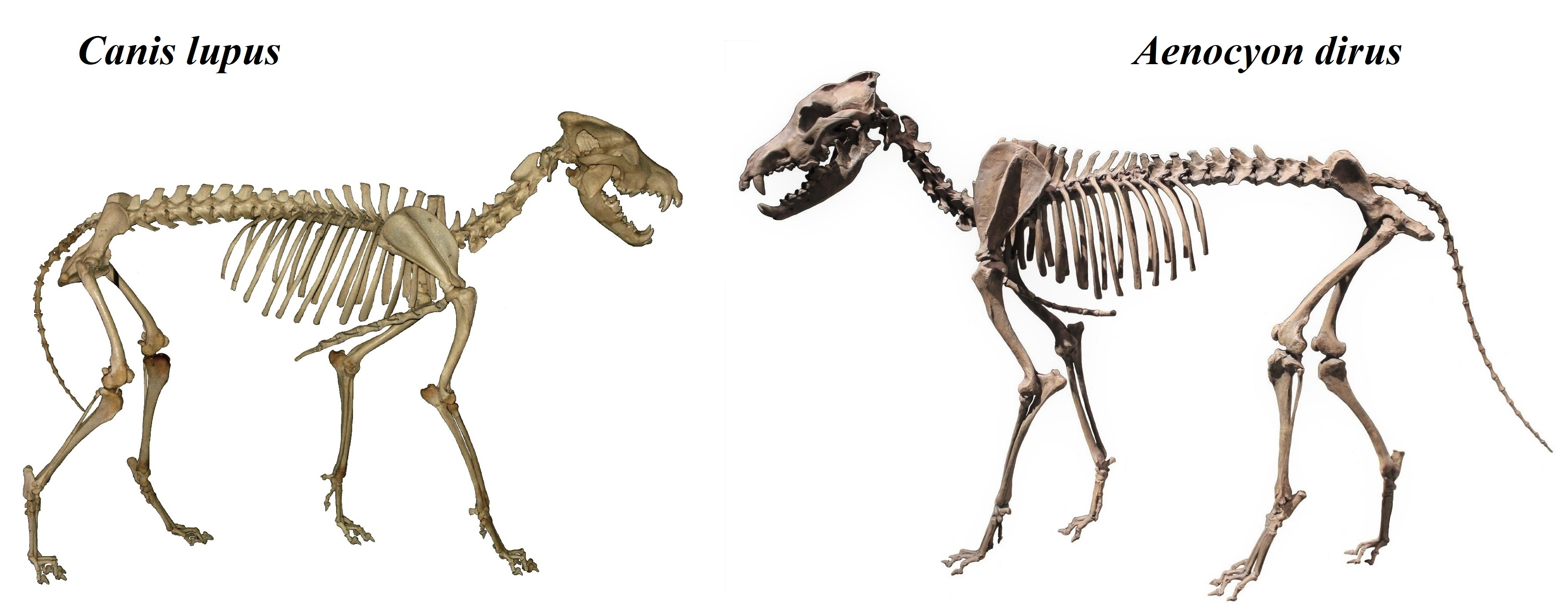
  - Modern mounted skeleton of Canis lupus, the grey wolf, to scale with a fossilized skeleton of the Pleistocene wolf Canis dirus, or dire wolf
    †Canis dirus – or unidentified comparable form
  - †Canis latrans
  - †Canis lupus
- †Carpocyon
- Castor
  - †Castor canadensis – or unidentified comparable form
- †Catostomus
- Celtis
- Cercidiphyllum
- Charina
- Chrysemys
- Cnemidophorus
- †Colodon
- †Cormocyon
- †Cormohipparion
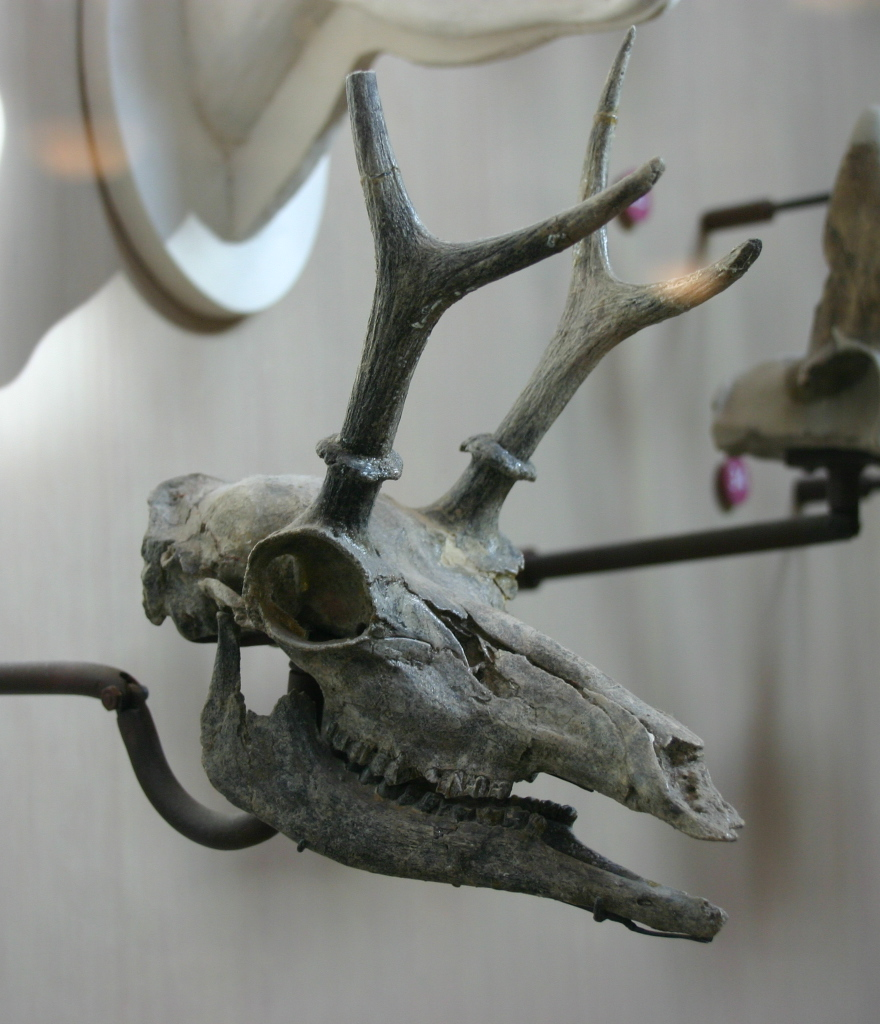
- Fossilized skull of the Miocene pronghorn Cosoryx
  †Cosoryx
  - †Cosoryx furcatus
- †Cranioceras
- Crotalus
- †Cynarctoides
  - †Cynarctoides acridens
  - †Cynarctoides lemur
  - †Cynarctoides roii
- †Cynarctus
- †Cynodesmus
- Cynomys
- †Daphoenus
- †Desmatippus
- †Desmatochoerus
- †Desmocyon
- †Diceratherium
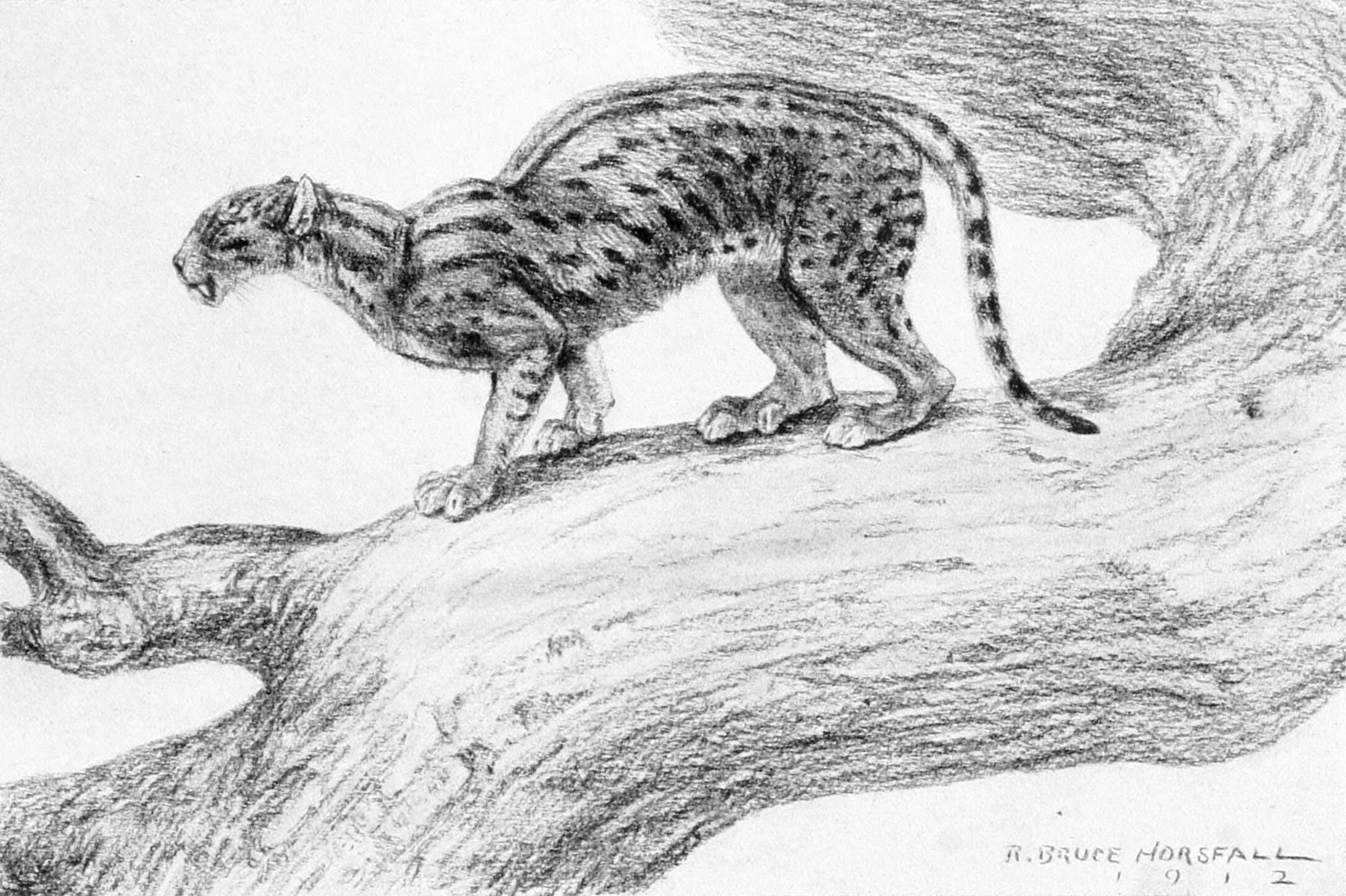
- Life restoration of the Eocene-Miocene false saber-toothed cat Dinictis. Robert Bruce Horsfall (1913).
  †Dinictis
- †Dinohyus
- †Dipoides
- †Domnina
- †Duchesnehippus
- †Duchesneodus
- †Ectopocynus
- †Ekgmowechashala
  - †Ekgmowechashala philotau – type locality for species
- Elaphe
  - †Elaphe vulpina
- †Elomeryx
- †Enhydrocyon
- †Entelodon
- †Eopelobates
- †Epicyon
- Equus
  - †Equus francisci
  - †Equus giganteus – or unidentified comparable form
- †Etheostoma
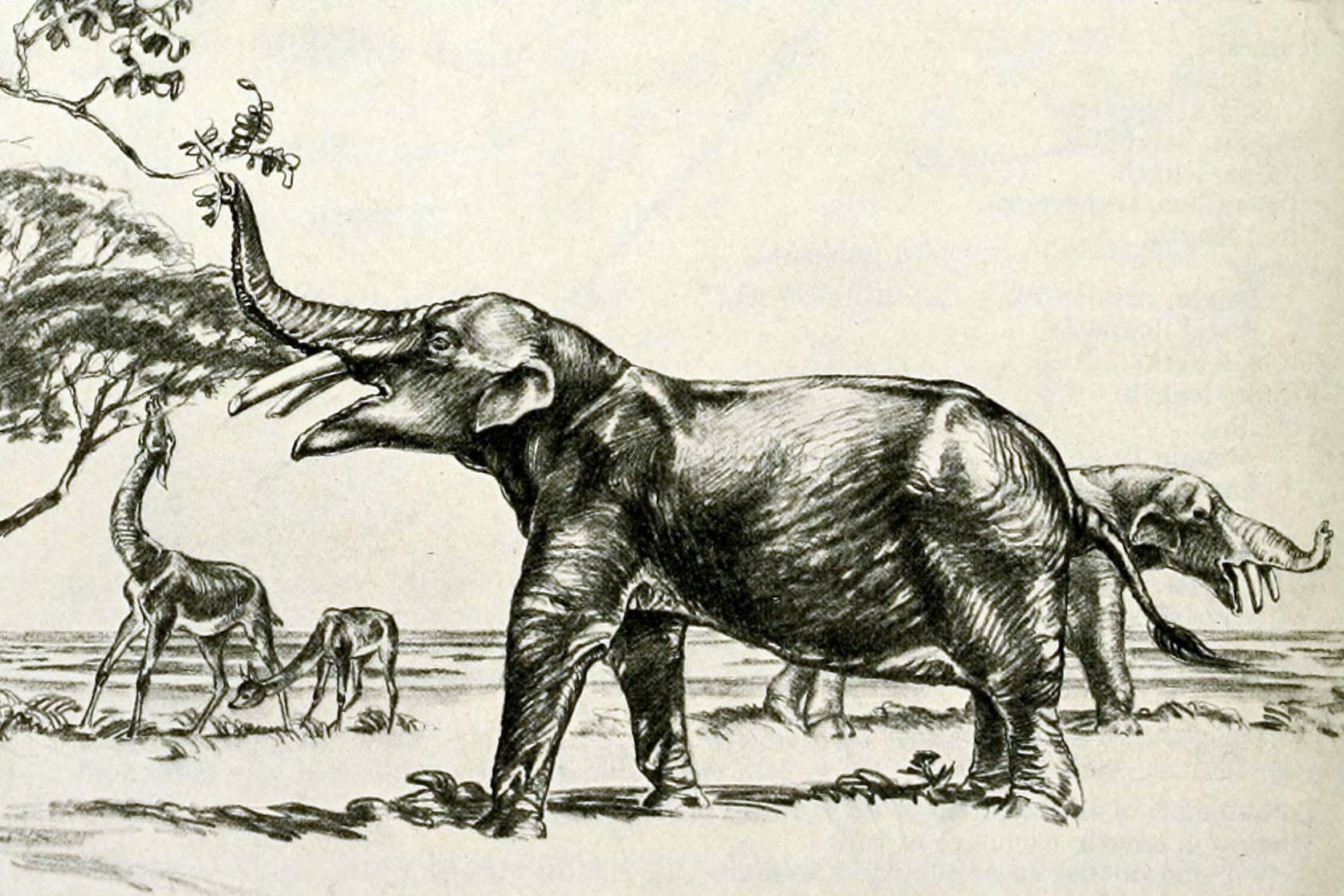
- Life restoration of the Miocene elephant relative Eubelodon
  †Eubelodon
- †Eucastor
- †Eucommia
- Eumeces
  - †Eumeces septentrionalis
- †Eusmilus
- Ficus
- Geomys
- †Gigantocamelus
- Glyptostrobus
- †Gomphotherium
- Graptemys
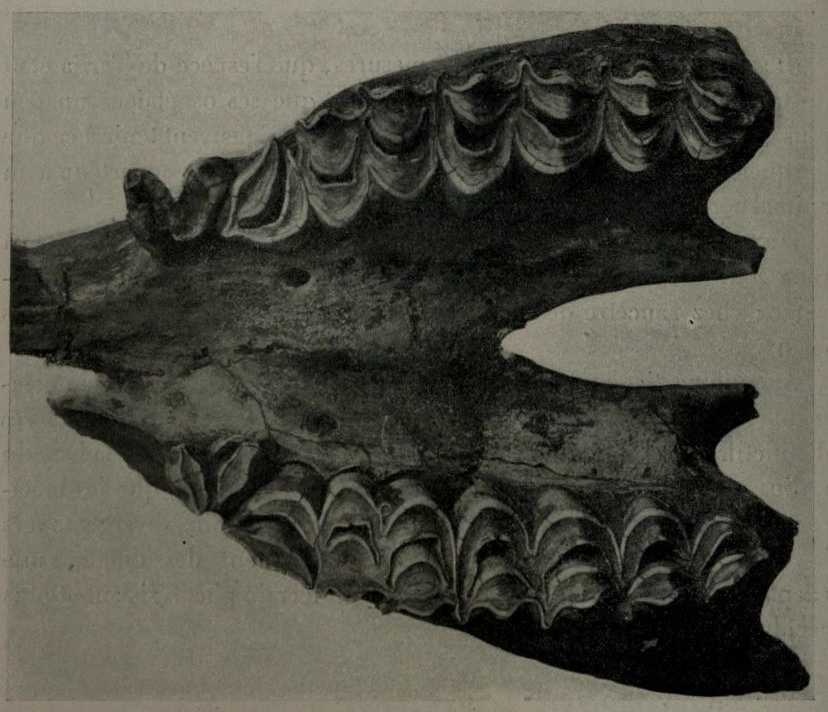
- Fossilized lower jaw of the Miocene-Pleistocene llama relative Hemiauchenia
  †Hemiauchenia
- †Hemicyon
- †Herpetotherium
  - †Herpetotherium fugax
- †Hesperocyon
- †Hesperotestudo
- Heterodon
- †Heteromeryx
- †Hipparion
- †Hippotherium
- †Homotherium – or unidentified comparable form
- †Hoplophoneus
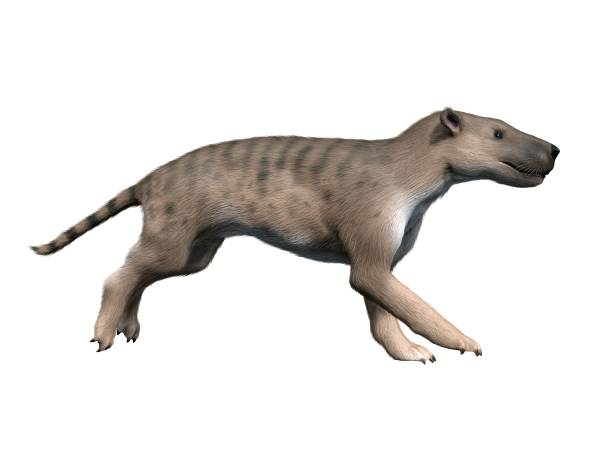
- Life restoration of the Eocene-Miocene creodont mammal Hyaenodon
  †Hyaenodon
  - †Hyaenodon crucians
  - †Hyaenodon horridus
  - †Hyaenodon montanus – or unidentified comparable form
  - †Hyaenodon mustelinus – type locality for species
- Hyla
- †Hypertragulus
- †Hypisodus
- †Hypohippus
- †Hypolagus
- †Hyporhina – type locality for genus
  - †Hyporhina antiqua – type locality for species
- †Hyracodon
- Ictalurus
- †Ischyrocyon
- †Ischyromys
- †Lambdoceras
- Lampropeltis
- Lepisosteus
- Lepomis
- †Leptauchenia
- †Leptictis
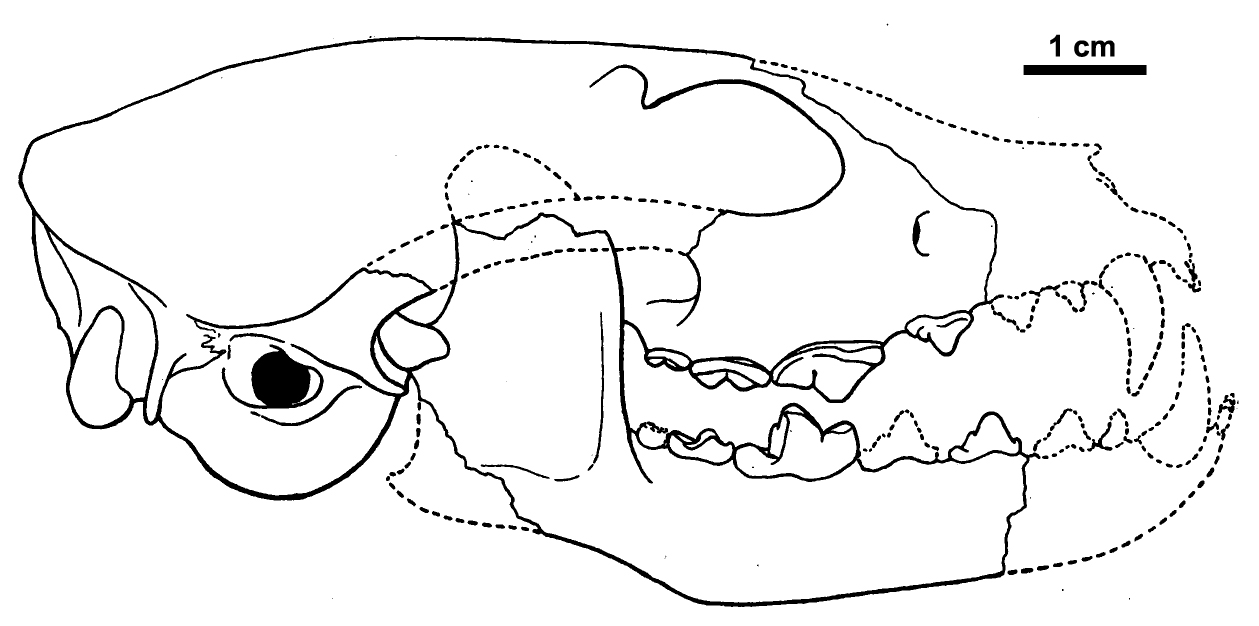
- Illustration of a fossilized skull of the Oligocene-Miocene dog Leptocyon
  †Leptocyon
- †Leptomeryx
- Lepus
  - †Lepus americanus – or unidentified comparable form
- †Longirostromeryx
- †Macrorhineura – type locality for genus
  - †Macrorhineura skinneri – type locality for species
- †Mammacyon
- †Mammuthus
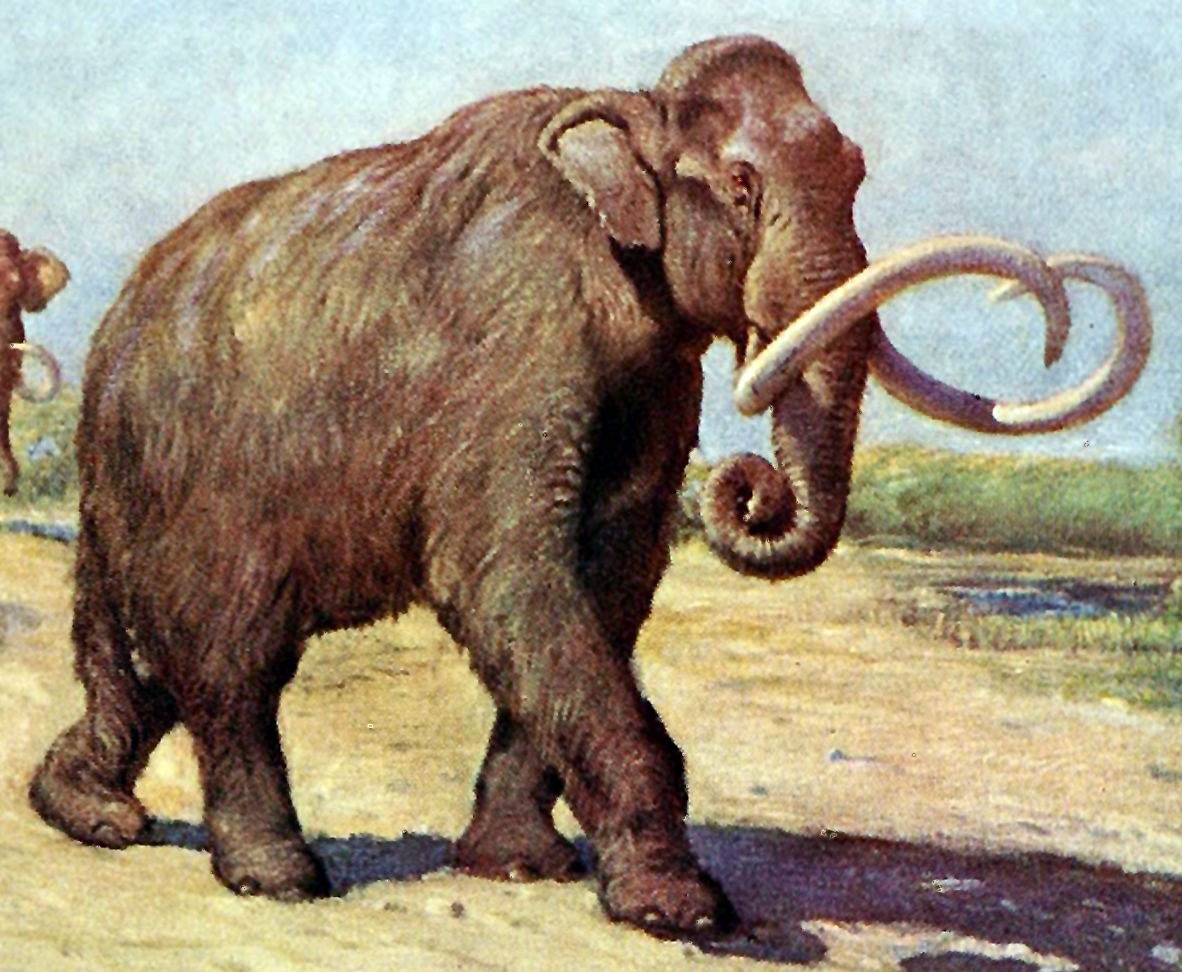
  - Life restoration of a herd of Mammuthus columbi, or Columbian mammoths. The extent of the fur depicted is hypothetical. Charles R. Knight (1909).
    †Mammuthus columbi
- Martes
- †Megacerops
- †Megachoerus – tentative report
- †Megaleptictis
  - †Megaleptictis altidens
- †Megalictis
  - †Megalictis ferox – type locality for species
- †Megalonyx
  - †Megalonyx leptostomus
  - †Megalonyx wheatleyi
- †Megapaloelodus – type locality for genus
- †Menoceras
- †Menops
- †Merychippus
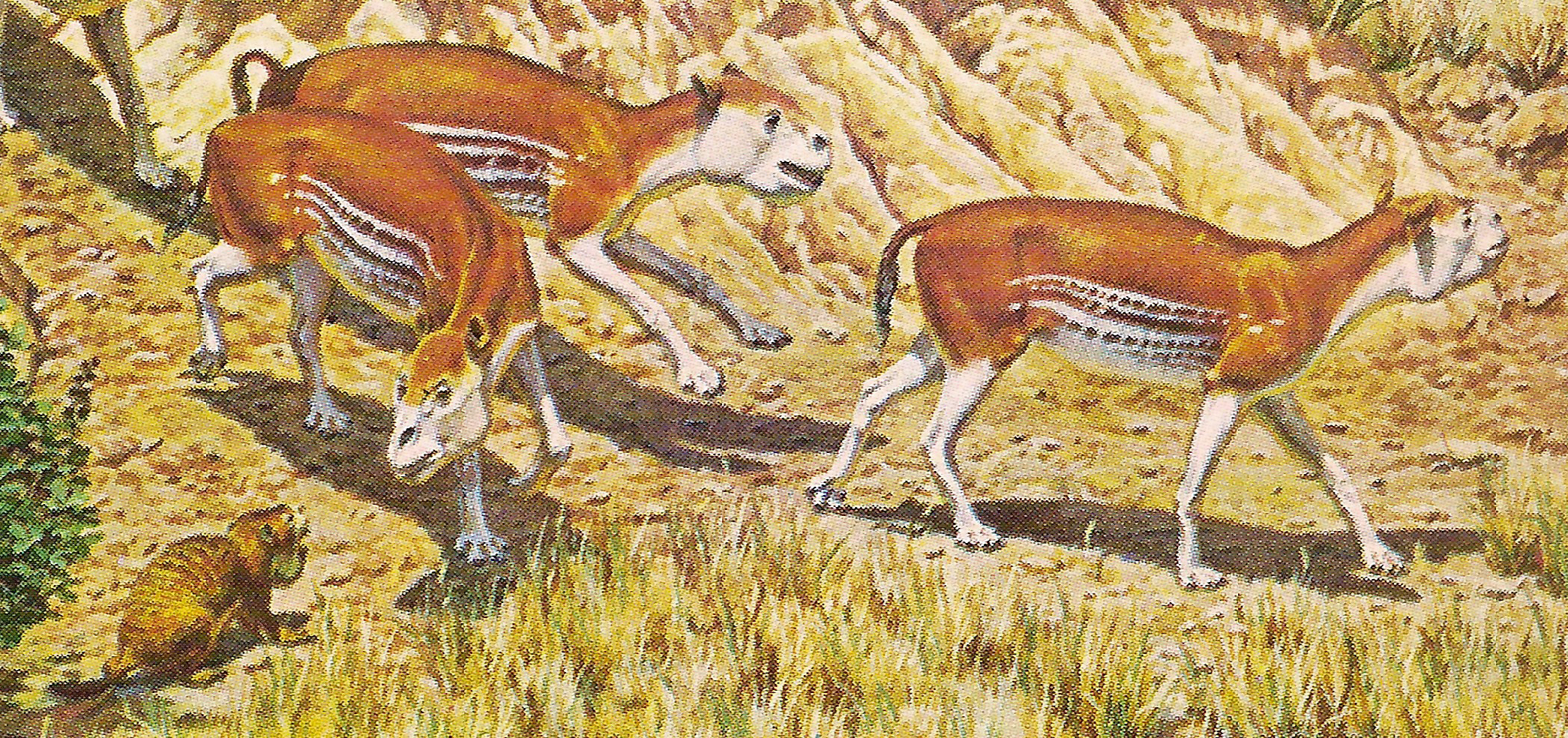
- Restoration of a herd of the Eocene-Miocene oreodont mammal Merychyus
  †Merychyus
- †Merycochoerus
- †Merycodus
- †Merycoides
- †Merycoidodon
- †Mesocyon
- †Mesohippus
- †Mesoreodon
- †Metamynodon
  - †Metamynodon planifrons
- †Michenia
- Microtus
- †Miniochoerus
- †Miohippus
  - †Miohippus grandis
- †Monosaulax
- †Moropus
- Mustela
- †Mylagaulus
- †Nannippus
- †Nanotragulus
- †Neohipparion – type locality for genus
- Neotoma
- Nerodia
  - †Nerodia sipedon
- †Nexuotapirus
- †Niglarodon
- †Nimravus
- Notophthalmus
- †Nototamias
- †Notropis
- †Noturus – tentative report
- Ondatra
- Onychomys
- †Oreodontoides
- Ortalis
- †Osbornodon
- †Otarocyon
- †Oxetocyon
- †Oxydactylus
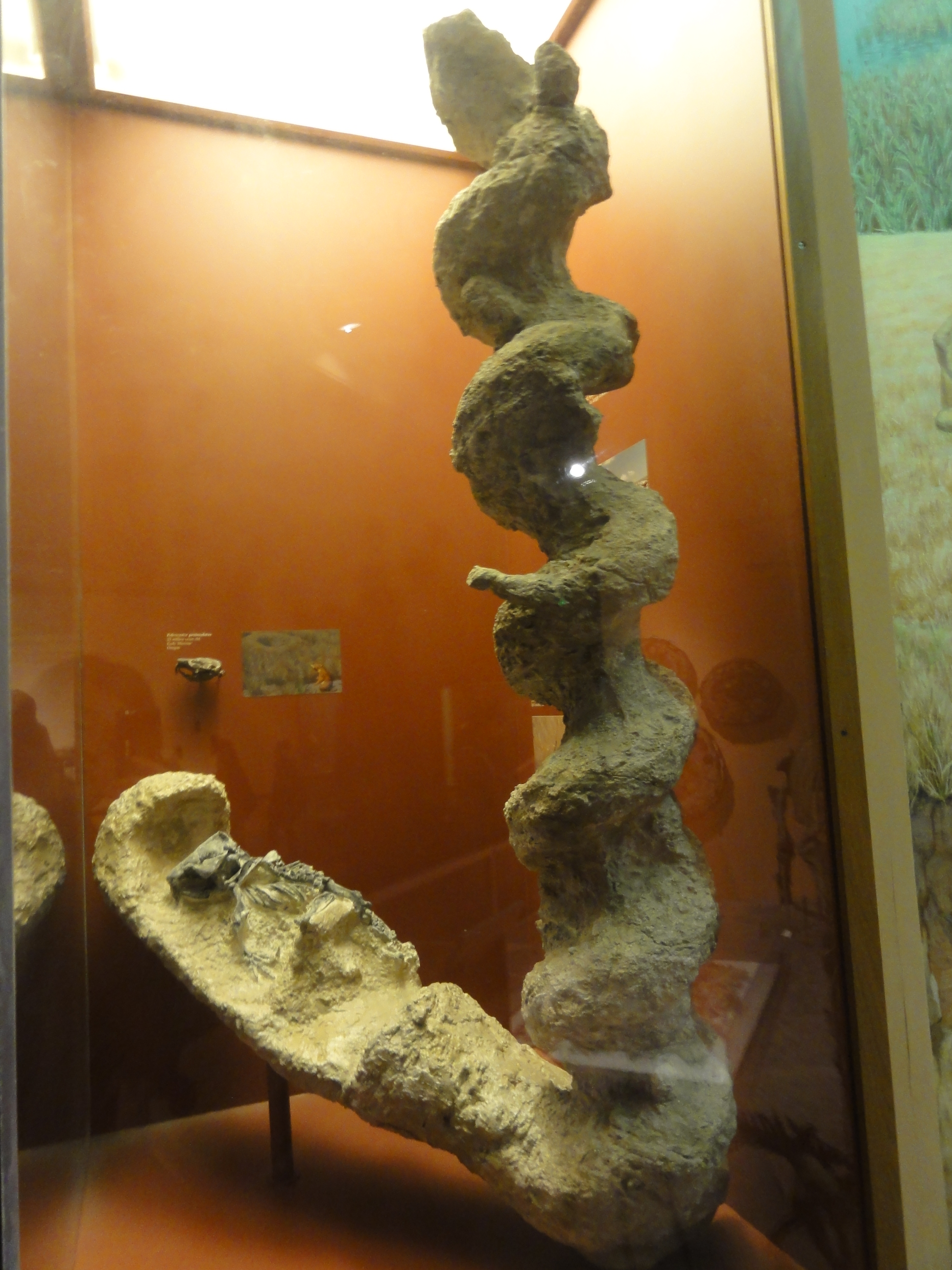
- Spiral-shaped fossilized burrow and associated skeleton of the Oligocene-Miocene beaver Palaeocastor
  †Palaeocastor
- †Palaeogale
- †Palaeolagus
- †Paracrax
- †Paradaphoenus
- †Paraenhydrocyon
- †Parahippus
- †Paramys
- †Paratomarctus
- †Paratylopus
- †Parictis
- †Peltosaurus
  - †Peltosaurus granulosus
- †Peraceras
- Perognathus
- Peromyscus
- †Philotrox
  - †Philotrox condoni
- †Phlaocyon
  - †Phlaocyon minor
- Phrynosoma
  - †Phrynosoma douglassi
- †Planera
- †Platygonus
- †Pliauchenia
- †Pliohippus
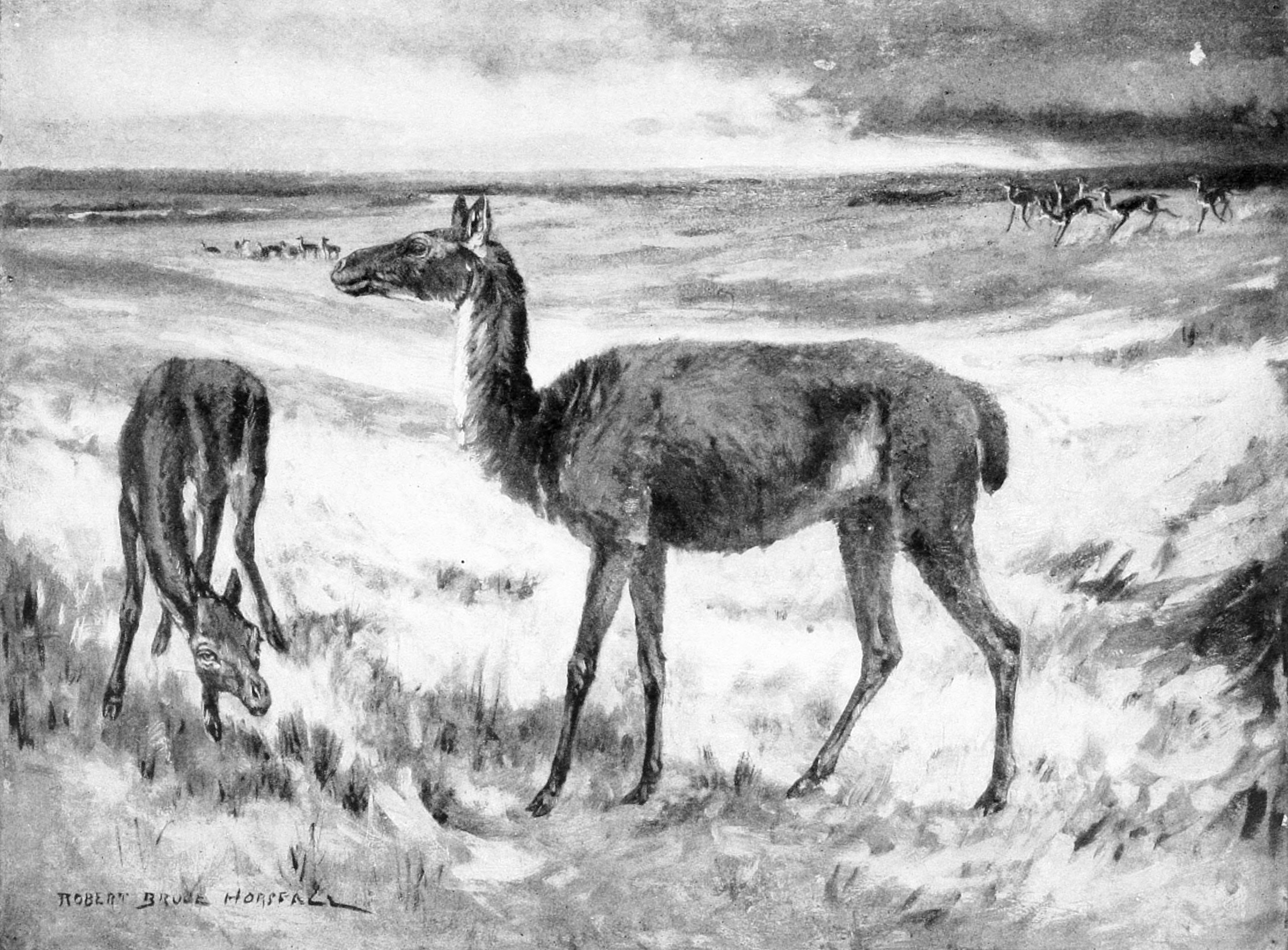
- Life restoration of the Eocene-Oligocene camel Poebrotherium
  †Poebrotherium
- †Pogonodon
- †Procamelus
- †Procastoroides
- †Promartes
- †Promerycochoerus
- †Proscalops
- †Protapirus
- †Proterix
- †Protoceras
- †Protohippus
- †Protolabis
- Pseudacris
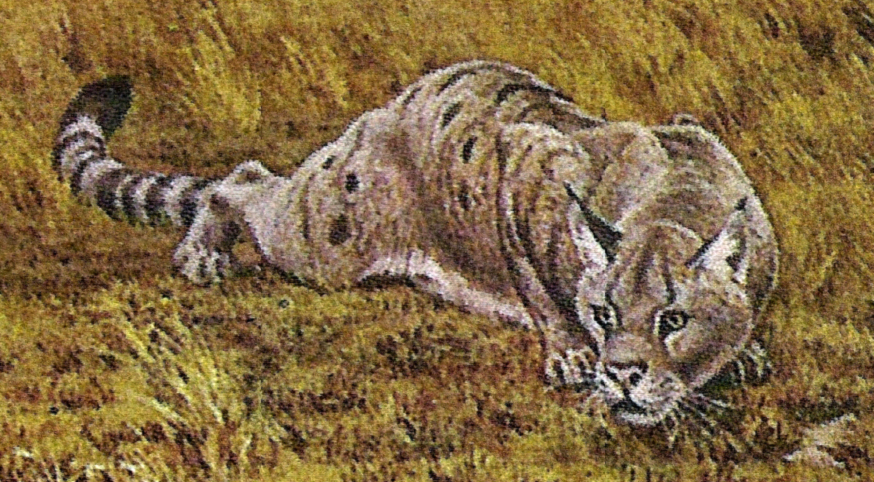
- Restoration of the Miocene cat Pseudaelurus
  †Pseudaelurus
- †Pseudhipparion
- †Pseudoprotoceras
- Querquedula
- †Rana
  - †Rana catesbeiana
  - †Rana pipiens
- Reithrodontomys
- Rhineura
- Salvadora
- Scaphiopus
- †Sespia
- Sorex
  - †Sorex cinereus
- Spea
- Spermophilus
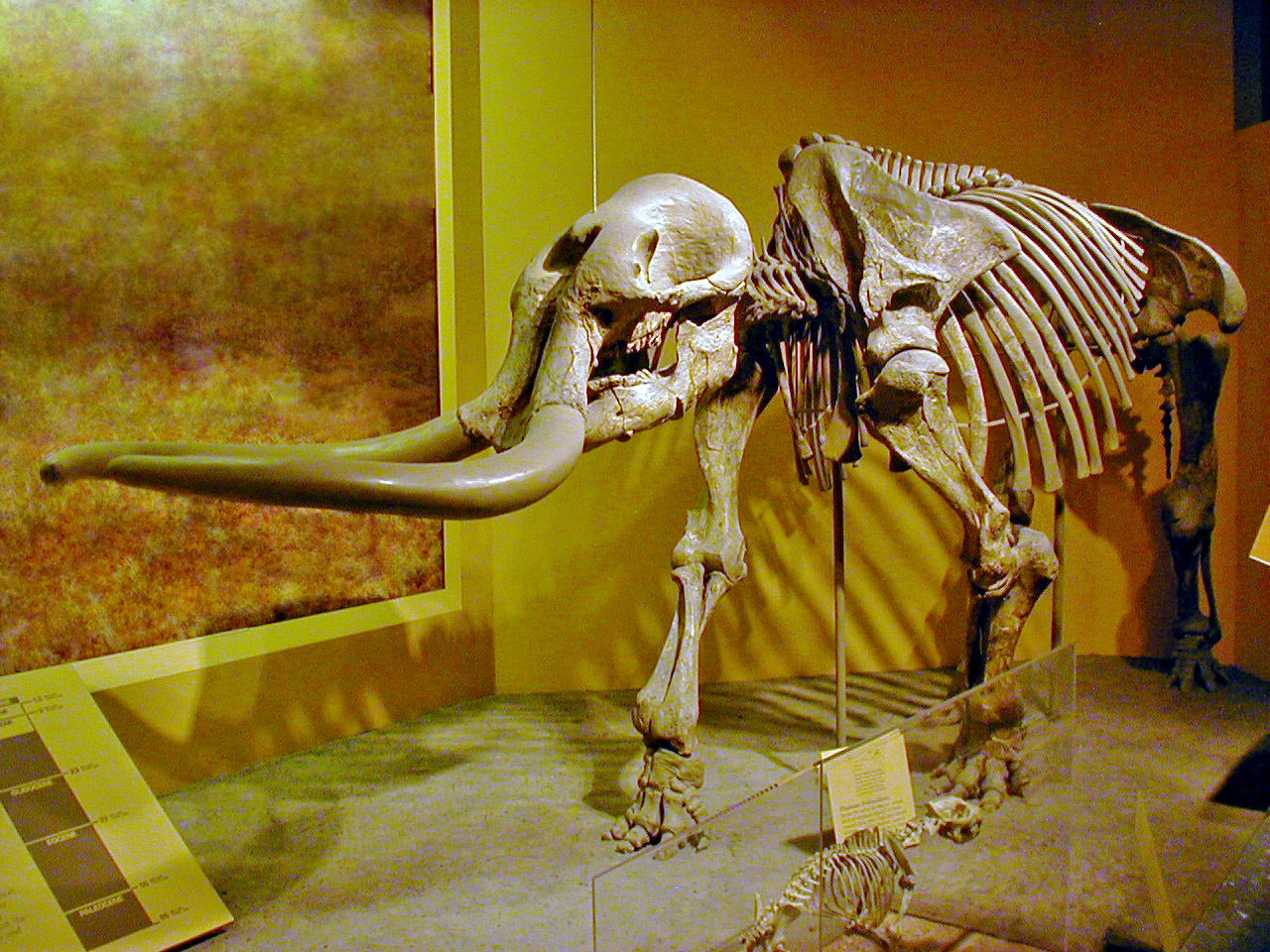
- Mounted fossilized skeleton of the Pliocene-Pleistocene elephant relative Stegomastodon
  †Stegomastodon
  - †Stegomastodon mirificus
- †Steneofiber
- Strix
- †Stylemys
- †Subhyracodon
- †Sunkahetanka
  - †Sunkahetanka geringensis
- Sylvilagus
  - †Sylvilagus floridanus
- Tapirus
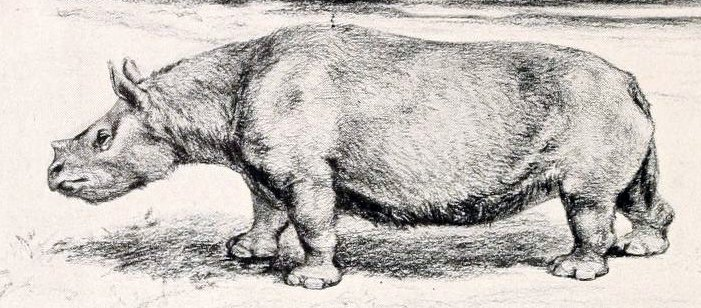
- Restoration of the Miocene-Pliocene rhinoceros Teleoceras
  †Teleoceras
  - †Teleoceras major
- Thamnophis
  - †Thamnophis sirtalis
- Thomomys
- †Titanotylopus
- †Trigenicus
- †Trigonias
- Tympanuchus
- †Ursavus
- †Ustatochoerus
- Zapus
- Zelkova
