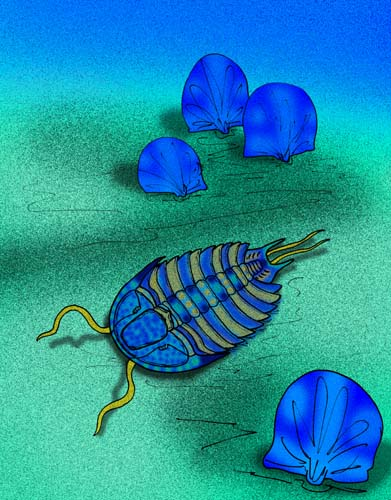
- Meteoraspis metra

Scientific classification
- Kingdom: Animalia
- Phylum: Arthropoda
- Clade: †Artiopoda
- Class: †Trilobita
- Order: †Ptychopariida
- Family: †Tricrepicephalidae
- Genus: †Meteoraspis; Resser, 1935, non Janvier, 1981, (a jawless fish)

Type species
- Ptychoparia metra Walcott, 1890

Species
- M. banffensis Resser, 1942; M. bidens Opik, 1967; M. bipunctata Lochman, 1938; M. borealis Lochman, 1938; M. boulderensis DeLand & Shaw, 1956; M. brevispinosa Rasetti, 1965; M. elongata Lochman; M. globosa (Miller, 1936); M. intermedia Lochman & Hu, 1961; M. laticephalus Kobayashi, 1938; M. metra (Walcott, 1890) (type) = Ptychoparia metra; M. mutica Rasetti, 1961; M. nevensis Jago & Cooper, 2005; M. orientalis Yuan & Yin, 1998; M. tinguirensis Rusconi, 1954

Synonyms
- Coleopachys; Greylockia; Meteraspis

= Meteoraspis =

Meteoraspis Temporal range: Dresbachian

Genus of trilobites

Meteoraspis is a genus of ptychopariid trilobites of the family Tricrepicephalidae. The various species lived from 501 to 497 million years ago during the Dresbachian faunal stage of the late Cambrian Period. Fossils of Meteoraspis are characteristic of Late Cambrian strata in North America, though they are found in Late Cambrian strata elsewhere in the world, such as M. nevensis from Victoria Land, Antarctica.

== Description ==
The outline of the exoskeleton of Meteoraspis is an elongate, slightly inverted egg shaped though almost ovate, widest at the tip of the genal spines and 1.6× as long as wide. The headshield (or cephalon) is highly vaulted. The well-defined central raised area (or glabella) is convex, elongate tapering, with a rounded front, and has only one furrow, crossing it near the back of the cephalon, defining the occipital ring. A node may be present on the occipital ring. The remaining parts of the cephalon, called fixed and free cheeks (or fixigenae and librigenae) are upsloping. The fracture lines (or sutures) that in moulting separate the librigenae from the fixigenae are divergent just in front of the eyes, becoming parallel near the border furrow and slightly convergent at the margin. From the back of the eyes the sutures follow a lazy S-curve, diverging first more outward and near the margin more backward, cutting the posterior margin within the inner bend of the spine (or opisthoparian sutures). Uniquely, the furrow parallel to the margin (or border furrow) has 2 not very noticeable pits in front of the glabella, and rarely a very faint 3rd median pit. There are no ridges that connect the eye to the glabella. The medium-sized eyes (over ⅓× the length of the glabella) are slightly behind the middle of the glabella. Genal angle ending in short spines extending backward about one thorax segment. The articulating middle part of the body (or thorax) has 13 segments. The axis is convex, and less than ½× as wide as each of the so-called pleurae to its sides. Segments pointed sideways with a rounded front (a shape called falcate). The tailshield (or pygidium) is about ½× as wide as the cephalon, almost twice as wide as long, excluding the two flat, shark tooth shaped, widely spaced spines. The axis in the pygidium is 1¼× longer than wide, with almost parallel sides, almost reaching the rear margin, with 3 or 4 axial rings; 3 sets of interpleural grooves and pleural furrows ending at distance of the margin. There is no furrow that would define a border in the pygidium.

=== Comparison with Tricrepicephalus ===
Species of the related genus Tricrepicephalus can be differentiated from those of Meteoraspis by having three equally prominent pits in the anterior border furrow, a much less vaulted cephalon, with spines reaching at least to the third thorax segment, 12 thorax segments and two long, tubular, curved pygidial spines that are reminiscent of the pincers of an earwig.

== Reassigned species ==
Philippe Janvier assigned Cephalaspis gigas, an Early Devonian osteostracan agnathan with a tremendously wide headshield, to the newly erected genus Meteoraspis in 1981. This name however, was already used by Resser in 1935 for a trilobite. In 1987 the osteostracan genus was renamed to Parameteoraspis.

- M. caroli = Parameteoraspis caroli
- M. gigas = Parameteoraspis gigas
- M. lanternaria = Parameteoraspis laternaria
- M. lata = Parameteoraspis lata
- M. laticornis = Parameteoraspis laticornis
- M. menoides = Parameteoraspis menoides
- M. oberon = Parameteoraspis oberon
- M. oblonga = Parameteoraspis oblonga

== Distribution ==
- M. etheridgei is known from the Cambrian of Australia (late Mindyallan, Dolodrook River Limestone Formation, Garvey Gully, Dolodrook River, East Victoria, 37.6° S, 146.6° E).
- M. metra has been excavated from the Upper Cambrian of the United States (Dresbachian, Coosella zone, Riley Formation, Central Texas, 30.3° N, 97.7° W; and Crepicephalus trilobite zone, lower Member of the Deadwood Formation, Whitewood Creek in Lead County, South Dakota, 44.3° N, 103.8° W).

== Ecology ==
M. etheridgei occurs together with Eugonocare tessellatum, Corynexochus plumula, Mindycrusta oepiki, Innitagnostus inexpectans, Peratagnostus, and Pseudagnostus idalis (all trilobites), Acrothele, Orbithele, Quadrisonia, Anabolotreta tegula, Anabolotreta sp., Dactylotreta redunca, Dactylotreta sp., Linnarssonia, Neotreta, Picnotreta sp., Picnotreta debilis, Stilpnotreta magna, Treptotreta sp., Treptotreta jucunda, Dictyonina, Micromitra modesta and Micromitra sp. (all brachiopods).
