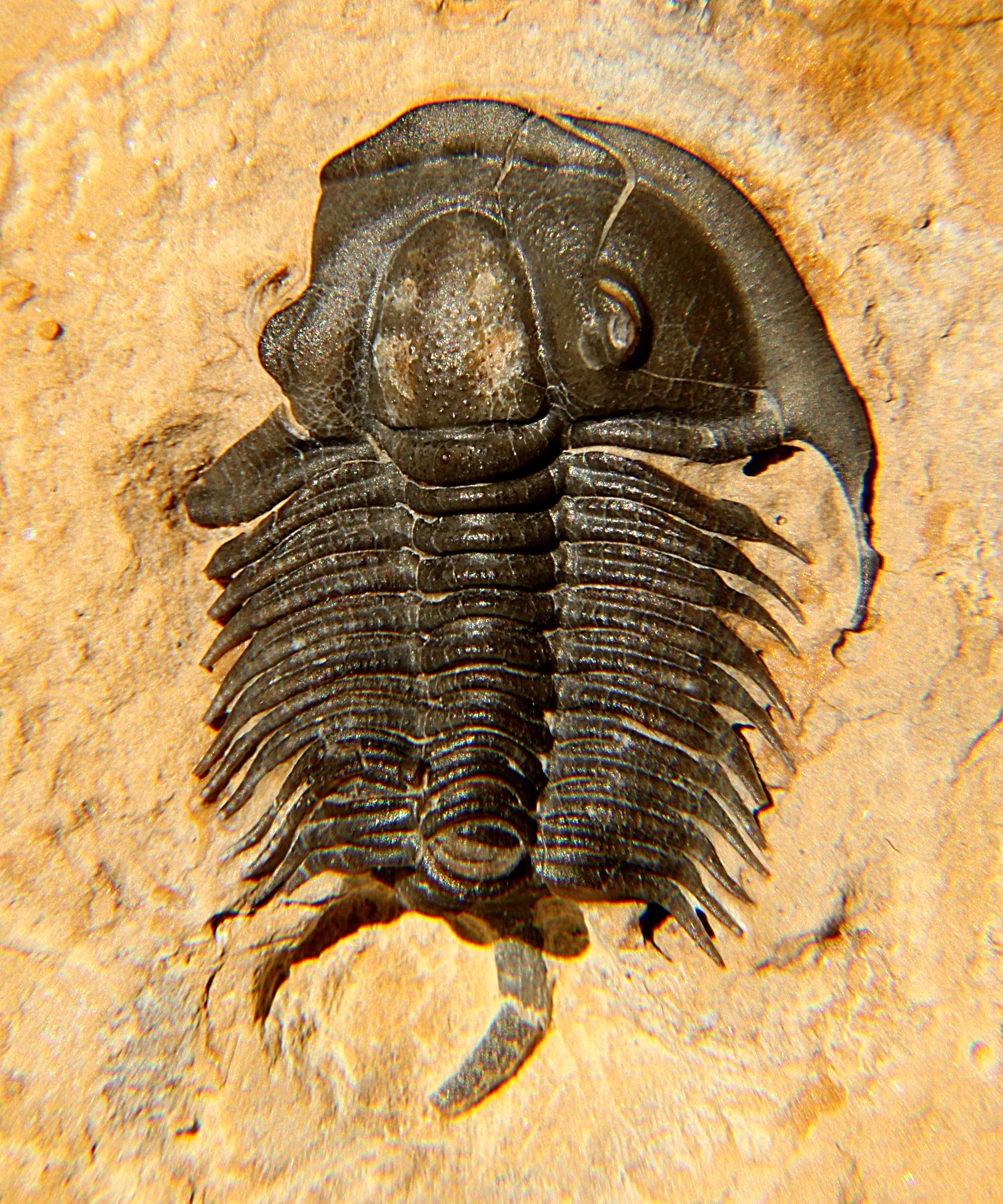
- Tricrepicephalus texanus, 19 mm

Scientific classification
- Kingdom: Animalia
- Phylum: Arthropoda
- Clade: †Artiopoda
- Class: †Trilobita
- Order: †Ptychopariida
- Family: †Tricrepicephalidae
- Genus: †Tricrepicephalus; Kobayashi, 1935

Species
- T. texanus (Shumard, 1861) (type species) = Arionellus texanus, Batyurus texanus, T. coria; T. arcuatus Tasch, 1951; T. asiaticus Yuan & Yin, 1998; T. tripunctatus (Whitfield, 1875) = Arionellus tripunctatus

Synonyms
- Paracrepicephalus Lochman, 1936

= Tricrepicephalus =

Tricrepicephalus Temporal range: Dresbachian

Extinct genus of ptychopariid trilobites

Tricrepicephalus is an extinct genus of ptychopariid trilobites of the family Tricrepicephalidae with species of average size. Its species lived from 501 to 497 million years ago during the Dresbachian faunal stage of the late Cambrian Period. Fossils of Tricrepicephalus are widespread in Late Cambrian deposits in North America, but is also known from one location in South America. Tricrepicephalus has an inverted egg-shaped exoskeleton, with three characteristic pits in the fold that parallels the margin of the headshield just in front of the central raised area. The articulating middle part of the body has 12 segments and the tailshield carries two long, tubular, curved pygidial spines that are reminiscent of earwig's pincers that rise backwards from the plain of the body at approximately 30°.

== Description ==
The outline of the exoskeleton of Tricrepicephalus is an inverted egg shaped though almost ovate, widest at the tip of the genal spines and 1.2× as long as wide, not including the pygidial spines. The headshield (or cephalon) is moderately vaulted. The well-defined central raised area (or glabella) is convex, elongate tapering, with a rounded front, and has only one furrow, crossing it near the back of the cephalon, defining the occipital ring. A node may be present on the occipital ring. The remaining parts of the cephalon, called fixed and free cheeks (or fixigenae and librigenae) are upsloping. The fracture lines (or sutures) that in moulting separate the librigenae from the fixigenae are divergent just in front of the eyes, becoming parallel near the border furrow and slightly convergent at the margin. From the back of the eyes the sutures follow a lazy S-curve, diverging first more outward and near the margin more backward, cutting the posterior margin within the inner bend of the spine (or opisthoparian sutures). Uniquely, the furrow parallel to the margin (or border furrow) has 2 not very noticeable pits in front of the glabella, and rarely a very faint 3rd median pit. There are no ridges that connect the eye to the glabella. The medium-sized eyes (over ⅓× the length of the glabella) are slightly behind the middle of the glabella. Genal angle ending in short spines extending backward about one thorax segment. The articulating middle part of the body (or thorax) has 12 segments. The axis is convex, and less than ½× as wide as each of the so-called pleurae to its sides. Segments pointed sideways with a rounded front (a shape called falcate). The tailshield (or pygidium) is about ½× as wide as the cephalon, almost twice as wide as long, excluding the two, widely spaced spines. These are at an angle of approximately 30° with the rest body. The axis in the pygidium is 1¼× longer than wide, with almost parallel sides, almost reaching the rear margin, with 3 or 4 axial rings; 3 sets of interpleural grooves and pleural furrows ending at distance of the margin. There is no furrow that would define a border in the pygidium.

=== Differences with Meteoraspis ===
Meteoraspis has two equally prominent pits in the anterior border furrow, a much more vaulted cephalon, with short spines reaching to about the second thorax segment, 13 thorax segments and two flat, shark tooth shaped, widely spaced spines on the pygidium.

== Reassigned species ==
- T. metra = Meteoraspis metra

== Distribution ==
- T. asiaticus occurs in the Upper Cambrian of China (Guzhangian, Blackwelderia zone, Chefu Formation, Yangweizhou-Jimachong)
- T. arcuatus has been found in the Upper Cambrian of the United States (Merioneth, Warrior Formation, Highway No. 322 near Waddle, Bed 13.3, Centre County, Pennsylvania, 40.8° N, 77.9° W)
- T. texanus is known from the Upper Cambrian of Canada (Dresbachian, Rabbitkettle Formation, southern Mackenzie Mountains, northwest Canada) and the United States (Dresbachian, Crepicephalus trilobite zone, Deadwood Formation, Whitewood Creek in Lead County, South Dakota, 44.3° N, 103.8° W).
- T. tripunctatus is present in the Upper Cambrian of the United States (Dresbachian, Crepicephalus trilobite zone, lower Member of the Deadwood Formation, Little Elk Creek in Lead County, South Dakota, 44.3° N, 103.8° W).

== Ecology ==
T. tripunctatus occurs together with trilobite species from the genera Coosia, Crepicephalus, Kingstonia, Pseudagnostina, and Coosina.
