= White River Fauna =

Fossil animals found in the western US

The White River Fauna are fossil animals found in the White River Group of South Dakota, North Dakota, Wyoming, Colorado and Nebraska in the United States. In southwest South Dakota and northwest Nebraska, these fossils are characteristic of the White River Badlands (including Badlands National Park), though they can be found far beyond the limits of the White River watershed.

In Wyoming, the White River Group is undifferentiated, and is more commonly known as the White River Formation. Further east in Nebraska and South Dakota, the group is divided into the Chadron Formation (lower part) and Brule Formation (upper part). Exposures are less well-investigated in northeast Colorado and scattered sites across western North Dakota. The White River Group is overlain by the Sharps Formation in Badlands National Park and the Arikaree Group in northwest Nebraska.

Animals from the White River Group date from the Eocene and Oligocene epochs. The fauna is representative of four North American Land Mammal Ages (NALMAs):

- Arikareean (late Oligocene [Chattian] - early Miocene [Burdigalian], 29.5 - 18.5 million years ago)
- Whitneyan ("mid-Oligocene" [Rupelian], 31.8 - 29.5 million years ago)
- Orellan (early Oligocene [Rupelian], 33.9 - 31.8 million years ago)
- Chadronian (late Eocene [Priabonian], 37 - 33.9 million years ago)

Only the uppermost layers of the White River Group extend into the Arikareean (specifically, the informal "brown siltstone member" of the Brule Formation). All NALMA and Epoch information in this list refers solely to each species' distribution through the White River Group, as some species survive into later time intervals outside of the White River area.

== Birds ==
Genus	Species	NALMA	Epoch	Notes	Image
†Archaealectrornis	†A. sibleyi		"early Oligocene"	A potential pheasant or guan-like bird	
†Badistornis	†B. aramus	Orellan	early Oligocene	An aramid (limpkin relative) known from both leg fossils and possible egg fossils.	
†Bathornis	†B. celeripes	Chadronian - Orellan	late Eocene - early Oligocene	The type genus of Bathornithidae, an extinct family of large predatory birds related to seriemas.	
†Bathornis	†B. cursor	Chadronian	late Eocene	The type genus of Bathornithidae, an extinct family of large predatory birds related to seriemas.	
†Bathornis	†B. geographicus	Whitneyan	"mid" Oligocene	The type genus of Bathornithidae, an extinct family of large predatory birds related to seriemas.	
†Bathornis	†B. veredus (type)	Chadronian - Orellan	late Eocene - early Oligocene	The type genus of Bathornithidae, an extinct family of large predatory birds related to seriemas.	
Buteo	†B. grangeri	Orellan	early Oligocene	A hawk in the living genus Buteo	
"Gavia"	†"G." pusilla	Orellan	early Oligocene	A potential loon	
†Gnotornis	†G. aramielus	Whitneyan	"mid" Oligocene	A heron	
†Palaeogyps	†P. prodromus	Chadronian	late Eocene	A potential cathartid (New World vulture)	
†Palaeonossax	†P. senectus	Whitneyan	"mid" Oligocene	A potential cracid (guan or curassow relative)	
†Palaeoplancus	†P. sternbergi	Whitneyan	"mid" Oligocene	An osprey-like accipitriform, initially regarded as an eagle	
†Paracrax	†P. antiqua	Orellan	early Oligocene	A bathornithid initially mistaken for a cormorant (Phalacrocorax mediterraneus)	
†Paracrax	†P. gigantea	Whitneyan	"mid" Oligocene	A large bathornithid, closely related and similar to the conspecific Bathornis; however, it seems to have occupied more arid environments.	
†Paracrax	†P. wetmorei	Whitneyan	"mid" Oligocene	A large bathornithid, closely related and similar to the conspecific Bathornis; however, it seems to have occupied more arid environments.	
†Phasmagyps	†P. patritus	Chadronian	late Eocene	A potential cathartid (New World vulture)	
†Procrax	†P. brevipes	Chadronian	late Eocene	A potential cracid (guan or curassow relative) with short legs similar to piping guans (Pipile)	

== Mammals ==
=== †Apatemyids ===
Genus	Species	NALMA	Epoch	Notes	Image
†Apatemys	†A. sp.	Chadronian	late Eocene	An apatemyid (part of an extinct group of aye-aye-like insectivores)	
†Sinclairella	†S. dakotensis	Chadronian - Whitneyan	late Eocene - "mid" Oligocene	An apatemyid	

=== Artiodactyls ===
==== †Antracotheres ====
Genus	Species	NALMA	Epoch	Notes	Image
†Aepinacodon	†A. americanus	Chadronian	late Eocene	A large bothriodontine anthracothere (extinct hippo relative) with a long snout.	
†Aepinacodon	†A. deflectus	Chadronian	late Eocene	A large bothriodontine anthracothere (extinct hippo relative) with a long snout.	
†Bothriodon	†B. rostratus	Chadronian - Orellan	late Eocene - early Oligocene	A medium-sized bothriodontine anthracothere with a very long snout.	
†Elomeryx	†E. armatus	Orellan - Whitneyan	early - "mid" Oligocene	A small-medium bothriodontine anthracothere with a slender snout.	
†Heptacodon	†H. curtus (type)	Orellan - Whitneyan	early - "mid" Oligocene	A medium-large anthracotheriine anthracothere with a short, broad snout.	
†Heptacodon	†H. gibbiceps	Whitneyan	"mid" Oligocene	A medium-large anthracotheriine anthracothere with a short, broad snout.	
†Heptacodon	†H. occidentale	Chadronian - Orellan	late Eocene - early Oligocene	A medium-large anthracotheriine anthracothere with a short, broad snout.	

==== Camelids ====
Genus	Species	NALMA	Epoch	Notes	Image
†Matthewlabis				A camelid which appears to be a long-snouted relative of Poebrotherium.	
†Poebrotherium	†P. wilsoni (type); †P. chadronensis; †P. eximium; †P. franki; †P. labratum			An early camelid (camel and llama relative) with a lithe, antelope-like build	
†Pseudolabis				An early stenomyline (small gazelle-like camelid)	

==== †Entelodonts ====
Genus	Species	NALMA	Epoch	Notes	Image
†Archaeotherium	†A. mortoni	Chadronian - Whitneyan	late Eocene - "mid" Oligocene	A medium-sized entelodont (extinct boar-like omnivores related to hippos).	

==== †Leptochoerids ====
Leptochoerids are an extinct and rare group of hoofed mammals. Their affinities and anatomy are nearly unknown beyond their teeth, which were generally bunodont in form.

Genus	Species	NALMA	Epoch	Notes	Image
†Leptochoerus	†L. elegans	Chadronian - Whitneyan	late Eocene - "mid" Oligocene	A leptochoerid with a fairly broad snout and teeth which were slightly more adapted for grinding compared to Stibarus.	
†Leptochoerus	†L. emilyae	Orellan	early Oligocene	A leptochoerid with a fairly broad snout and teeth which were slightly more adapted for grinding compared to Stibarus.	
†Leptochoerus	†L. spectabilis	Orellan - Whitneyan	early - "mid" Oligocene	A leptochoerid with a fairly broad snout and teeth which were slightly more adapted for grinding compared to Stibarus.	
†Leptochoerus	†L. supremus	Whitneyan	"mid" Oligocene	A leptochoerid with a fairly broad snout and teeth which were slightly more adapted for grinding compared to Stibarus.	
†Stibarus	†S. obtusilobus	Chadronian - Whitneyan	late Eocene - "mid" Oligocene	A leptochoerid with a narrower snout and teeth which were slightly more adapted for shearing compared to Leptochoerus	
†Stibarus	†S. quadricuspis	Chadronian - Orellan	late Eocene - early Oligocene	A leptochoerid with a narrower snout and teeth which were slightly more adapted for shearing compared to Leptochoerus	

==== †Merycoidodontoids ====
Merycoidodontoids, also known as oreodonts, are an extinct yet formerly abundant group of hoofed mammals with short legs and barrel-shaped bodies. Most oreodonts were part of the family Merycoidodontidae, distinguished by hoofs and a short tail. Despite their pig-like stature, they were probably more closely related to camels.

Genus	Species	NALMA	Epoch	Notes	Image
†Agriochoerus	†A. antiquus	Chadronian - Orellan	late Eocene - early Oligocene	An agriochoerid (an early-diverging merycoidodontoid which retains claws and a long tail)	
†Agriochoerus	†A. major	Orellan	early Oligocene	An agriochoerid (an early-diverging merycoidodontoid which retains claws and a long tail)	
†Agriochoerus	†A. gaudryi	Whitneyan	"mid" Oligocene	An agriochoerid (an early-diverging merycoidodontoid which retains claws and a long tail)	
†Bathygenys	†B. alpha	Chadronian	late Eocene	A small oreonetine, one of the smallest and earliest known oreodeonts. An index taxon of the Chadronian NALMA.	
†Bathygenys	†B. hedlundae	Chadronian	late Eocene	A small oreonetine, one of the smallest and earliest known oreodeonts. An index taxon of the Chadronian NALMA.	
†Leptauchenia	†L. decora	Orellan - Whitneyan	early - "mid" Eocene	A small leptaucheniine with a short skull and adaptations for an abrasive diet. Abundant during the Whitneyan.	
†Leptauchenia	†L. major	Whitneyan	"mid" Oligocene	A small leptaucheniine with a short skull and adaptations for an abrasive diet. The main index taxon of the Whitneyan NALMA.	
†Merycoidodon	†M. bullatus	Orellan 4 - Whitneyan	early - "mid" Eocene	A common sheep-sized merycoidodontine. The main index taxon of the Orellan 4.	
†Merycoidodon	†M. culbertsoni	Chadronian 4 - Orellan	late Eocene - early Oligocene	A common sheep-sized merycoidodontine	
†Merycoidodon	†M. major	late Whitneyan	"mid" Oligocene	A common sheep-sized merycoidodontine. The main index taxon of the late Whitneyan.	
†Merycoidodon	†M. presidioensis	Chadronian 2	late Eocene	A common sheep-sized merycoidodontine	
†Mesoreodon	†M. chelonyx	Arikareean	late Oligocene	A merycoidodontine, probably the ancestor to the later oreodont subfamily Promerycochoerinae.	
†Miniochoerus	†M. affinis	Orellan 2	early Oligocene	A small miniochoerine. The main index taxon of the Orellan 2.	
†Miniochoerus	†M. chadronensis	Chadronian 4 - Orellan 1	late Eocene - early Oligocene	A medium-sized miniochoerine. The main index taxon of the Chadronian 4.	
†Miniochoerus	†M. forsythae	Chadronian 3	late Eocene	A medium-sized early miniochoerine.	
†Miniochoerus	†M. gracilis	Orellan 3	early Oligocene	A very small miniochoerine. The main index taxon of the Orellan 3.	
†Miniochoerus	†M. starkensis	Orellan 4	early Oligocene	A small miniochoerine.	

==== †Protoceratids ====
†Protoceratidae is an extinct family of deer-like hoofed mammals which would evolve elaborate horns during the Miocene. The Eocene-Oligocene species found in the White River Group were rare and had simpler skulls compared to their later (synthetoceratine) counterparts.

Genus	Species	NALMA	Epoch	Notes	Image
†Heteromeryx	†H. dispar	Chadronian	early Eocene	A "leptotraguline" (early-diverging protoceratid without horns)	
†"Leptotragulus"	†"L." profectus	Chadronian	early Eocene	A "leptotraguline", sometimes regarded as a species of Trigenicus.	
†Poabromylus	†P. sp.	Chadronian	early Eocene	A "leptotraguline"	
†Protoceras	†P. celer	Whitneyan	"mid" Oligocene	A protoceratine (early horned protoceratid) with strong sexual dimorphism. The males have large canines and three pairs of blunt horns similar to giraffe ossicones.	
†Pseudoprotoceras	†P. longinaris	Chadronian	early Eocene	A "leptotraguline"	
†Pseudoprotoceras	†P. minor	Chadronian	early Eocene	A "leptotraguline", sometimes regarded as a species of Poabromylus.	
†Pseudoprotoceras	†P. taylori	Chadronian	early Eocene	A "leptotraguline"	

==== Ruminants ====
Early ruminants (cud-chewing hoofed mammals) of the White River Group were very small. They were similar in appearance to modern chevrotains (mouse deer) or hornless dik-diks, though beyond this general body shape their affinities are unclear.

Genus	Species	NALMA	Epoch	Notes	Image
†Hypertragulus	†H. calcaratus	Orellan - Whitneyan	early - "mid" Oligocene	A small fruit-eating hypertragulid which may have lived in groups. The main index taxon of the Orellan NALMA.	
†Hypisodus	†H. minimus	Chadronian - Whitneyan	late Eocene - "mid" Oligocene	A tiny (rabbit-sized) hypertragulid with enlarged eyes, a thin snout, and hypsodont teeth. One of the smallest artiodactyls to ever exist.	
†Hypisodus	†H. retallacki	Whitneyan	"mid" Oligocene	A tiny (rabbit-sized) hypertragulid with enlarged eyes, a thin snout, and hypsodont teeth. One of the smallest artiodactyls to ever exist.	
†Leptomeryx	†L. evansi	Orellan - Whitneyan	early - "mid" Oligocene	A leptomerycid, the most common species found in the area. An index taxon of the Orellan NALMA.	
†Leptomeryx	†L. exilis	Orellan	early Oligocene	A leptomerycid	
†Leptomeryx	†L. obliquidens	Whitneyan	"mid" Oligocene	A leptomerycid	
†Leptomeryx	†L. speciosus	Chadronian 4	late Eocene	A leptomerycid	
†Leptomeryx	†L. mammifer	Chadronian 3	late Eocene	A leptomerycid. The main index taxon of the Chadronian 3.	
†Leptomeryx	†L. yoderi	Chadronian 2	late Eocene	A leptomerycid. The main index taxon of the Chadronian 2.	
†Parvitragulus	†P. priscus	Chadronian	late Eocene	A very small praetragulid	
†Santuccimeryx	†S. elissae	Orellan 3 - Whitneyan 1	early - "mid" Oligocene	A tiny brachycephalic leptomerycid, formerly considered a species of Leptomeryx but seemingly transitional to later leptomerycids.	

==== Suina ====
A few suines (pig-like mammals) are rare components of the White River fauna. These species are sometimes regarded as the earliest peccaries (family Tayassuidae), though other times considered early suines which split off prior to the common ancestor between peccaries and Old World pigs (family Suidae).

Genus	Species	NALMA	Epoch	Notes	Image
†Perchoerus	†P. minor	Chadronian 2 - 4	late Eocene	A very small early peccary or a close relative	
†Perchoerus	†P. nanus	Orellan	early Oligocene	A small early peccary or a close relative	
†Perchoerus	†P. probus	Whitneyan	"mid" Oligocene	A medium-sized early peccary or a close relative	

=== Carnivorans ===
==== †Amphicyonids ====
Genus	Species	NALMA	Epoch	Notes	Image
†Brachyrhynchocyon	†B. dodgei	Chadronian - Orellan?	late Eocene - early Oligocene?	A stocky daphoenine amphicyonid ("bear-dog") with a short snout.	
†Brachyrhynchocyon	†B. intermedius	Chadronian	late Eocene	A stocky daphoenine amphicyonid ("bear-dog") with a short snout.	
†Daphoenictis	†D. tedfordi	Chadronian	late Eocene	A small and rare daphoenine amphicyonid	
†Daphoenus	†D. hartshornianus	Orellan	early Oligocene	A fairly small daphoenine amphicyonid	
†Daphoenus	†D. lambei	Chadronian	late Eocene	A fairly small daphoenine amphicyonid, potentially ancestral to the Orellan Daphoenus species.	
†Daphoenus	†D. vetus (type)	Orellan	early Oligocene	A fairly large (coyote-sized) daphoenine amphicyonid	
†Daphoenus	†D. sp.	Chadronian - Arikareean	late Eocene - late Oligocene	Indeterminate Daphoenus fossils	
†Paradaphoenus	†P. minimus	Orellan - Whitneyan	early - "mid" Oligocene	A small daphoenine amphicyonid	
†Paradaphoenus	†P. tooheyi	Whitneyan	"mid" Oligocene	A small daphoenine amphicyonid	

==== Arctoids ====
Several species of arctoids, including potential ursoids (bear relatives) are known from the White River Group.

Genus	Species	NALMA	Epoch	Notes	Image
†Amphicynodon?	†A.? major	Chadronian	late Eocene	An amphicynodontine	
†Campylocynodon	†C. personi	Chadronian	late Eocene	A probable amphicynodontine	
†Drassonax	†D. harpagops	Orellan	early Oligocene	A possible amphicynodontine	
†Eoarctos	†E. vorax	Chadronian - Whitneyan	late Eocene - "mid" Oligocene	A subparictid (early bear)	
†Mustelavus	†M. priscus	Chadronian - Orellan	late Eocene - early Oligocene	A musteloid	
†Parictis	†P. primaevus	Orellan	early Oligocene	A subparictid (early bear)	
†Subparictis	†S. dakotensis	Chadronian - Whitneyan	late Eocene - "mid" Oligocene	A subparictid (early bear)	
†Subparictis	†S. gilpini	Chadronian - Orellan	late Eocene - early Oligocene	A subparictid (early bear)	
†Subparictis	†S. parvus	Chadronian - Orellan	late Eocene - early Oligocene	A subparictid (early bear)	

==== Canids ====
Genus	Species	NALMA	Epoch	Notes	Image
†Archaeocyon	†A. leptodus	Whitneyan - Arikareean	"mid" - late Oligocene	A small early borophagine (part of the "bone-crushing dog" subfamily)	
†Archaeocyon	†A. pavidus (type)	Whitneyan	"mid" Oligocene	A very small early borophagine	
†Cynarctoides	†C. lemur	Whitneyan?	"mid" Oligocene?	A borophagine	
†Cynodesmus	†C. thooides	Whitneyan	"mid" Oligocene	A medium-sized hesperocyonine (part of a subfamily of early dogs)	
†Ectopocynus	†E. antiquus	Whitneyan	"mid" Oligocene	A small hesperocyonine with robust premolars	
†Hesperocyon	†"H." coloradensis	Orellan	early Oligocene	A small hesperocyonine	
†Hesperocyon	†H. gregarius	Chadronian - Whitneyan	late Eocene - "mid" Oligocene	An abundant and slender hesperocyonine. This small generalist was probably similar to the ancestor of all canids.	
†Mesocyon	†"M." temnodon	Whitneyan	"mid" Oligocene	A medium-sized hesperocyonine	
†Leptocyon	†L. sp.?	Orellan?	early Oligocene?	A fox-like animal, possibly the oldest canine (the subfamily of living dogs, wolves, and foxes)	
†Osbornodon	†O. renjiei	Orellan - Whitneyan	early - "mid" Oligocene	A small hesperocyonine with traits similar to canines and borophagines.	
†Osbornodon	†O. sesnoni	Whitneyan	"mid" Oligocene	A large hesperocyonine with traits similar to canines and borophagines.	
†Otarocyon	†O. macdonaldi	Orellan	early Oligocene	A very small short-skulled borophagine, similar to a fennec fox	
†Oxetocyon	†O. cuspidatus	Whitneyan	"mid" Oligocene	A small omnivorous borophagine	
†Paraenhydrocyon	†P. josephi	Whitneyan	"mid" Oligocene	A medium-sized hypercarnivorous hesperocyonine	
†Sunkahetanka	†S. geringensis	Arikareean	late Oligocene	A hesperocyonine, the largest and most hypercarnivorous canid of the White River fauna.	

==== †Nimravids ====
Nimravids ("false saber-toothed cats") were the largest feliform predators of the White River fauna.

Genus	Species	NALMA	Epoch	Notes	Image
†Dinictis	†D. felina	Chadronian - Whitneyan	late Eocene - "mid" Oligocene	A medium-sized nimravine nimravid with an agile build	
†Eusmilus	†E. cerebralis	Chadronian - Whitneyan	late Eocene - "mid" Oligocene	A small (bobcat-sized) hoplophoneine nimravid. Sometimes regarded as a species of Hoplophoneus.	
†Eusmilus	†E. dakotensis	Whitneyan	"mid" Oligocene	A large hoplophoneine nimravid. Sometimes regarded as a species of Hoplophoneus.	
†Eusmilus	†E. sicarius	Orellan	early Oligocene	A medium-sized hoplophoneine nimravid. Sometimes regarded as a species of Hoplophoneus.	
†Hoplophoneus	†H. occidentalis	Orellan - Whitneyan	early - "mid" Oligocene	A large (jaguar-sized) hoplophoneine nimravid	
†Hoplophoneus	†H. oharrai	Chadronian	late Eocene	A medium-sized hoplophoneine nimravid	
†Hoplophoneus	†H. primaevus (type)	Chadronian - Whitneyan	late Eocene - "mid" Oligocene	A medium-sized (cougar-sized) hoplophoneine nimravid	
†Nanosmilus	†N. kurteni	Orellan	early Oligocene	A small early-diverging hoplophoneine nimravid	
†Nimravus	†N. brachyops	Whitneyan	"mid" Oligocene	A moderately large (leopard-sized) nimravine nimravid	
†Pogonodon	†P. davisi	Orellan - Whitneyan	early - "mid" Oligocene	A medium-sized nimravine nimravid	
†Pogonodon	†P. platycopis	Orellan - Whitneyan	early - "mid" Oligocene	A large (jaguar-sized) nimravine nimravid	

==== Other carnivorans ====
Genus	Species	NALMA	Epoch	Notes	Image
†Palaeogale	†P. sectoria	Orellan	early Oligocene	An engimatic carnivoran, potentially a mustelid or viverravid	

=== Chiropterans ===
Genus / Taxon	Species	NALMA	Epoch	Notes	Image
†Chadronycteris	†C. rabenae	Chadronian 3	late Eocene	A vespertilionoid bat	
†Oligomyotis	†O. casementi	Orellan	early Oligocene	A vespertilionid (vesper bat)	
Vespertilionidae		Chadronian 3	late Eocene	An indeterminate vespertilionid, larger than Chadronycteris	

=== Eulipotyphlans ===
Modern ants often use tiny tooth fossils as grains when building their anthills, and teeth from eulipotyphlans (relatives of shrews, moles, and hedgehogs) are common at anthill sites close to the Chadronian-Orellan transition. Both erinaceomorph (hedgehog-like) and "soricomorph" (shrew and mole-like) eulipotyphlans occur in the White River fauna, though erinaceomorphs would go extinct in North America later on in the Cenozoic, near the end of the Miocene.

Genus	Species	NALMA	Epoch	Notes	Image
†Amphechinus	†A. sp.	Chadronian	late Eocene	An erinaceid (early hedgehog)	
†Ankylodon	†A. annectens	Orellan	early Oligocene	A late-surviving sespedectid (hedgehog relative)	
†Ankylodon	†A. progressus	Chadronian? - Orellan	late Eocene? - early Oligocene	A late-surviving sespedectid (hedgehog relative)	
†Apternodus	†A. brevirostris	Chadronian?	late Eocene?	An apternodontid (shrew relative)	
†Apternodus	†A. dasophylakas	Chadronian	late Eocene	An apternodontid (shrew relative)	
†Apternodus	†A. gregoryi	Chadronian - Orellan	late Eocene - early Oligocene	An apternodontid (shrew relative)	
†Apternodus	†A. iliffensis	Chadronian	late Eocene	An apternodontid (shrew relative)	
†Apternodus	†A. major	Chadronian	late Eocene	An apternodontid (shrew relative)	
†Apternodus	†A. mediaevus	Chadronian	late Eocene	An apternodontid (shrew relative)	
†Centetodon	†C. chadronensis	Chadronian - Orellan	late Eocene - early Oligocene	A geolabidid (shrew relative)	
†Centetodon	†C. magnus	Chadronian - Orellan	late Eocene - early Oligocene	A geolabidid (shrew relative)	
†Centetodon	†C. marginalis	Chadronian - Orellan	late Eocene - early Oligocene	A geolabidid (shrew relative)	
†Centetodon	†C. wolffi	Chadronian - Whitneyan	late Eocene - "mid" Oligocene	A geolabidid (shrew relative)	
†Clinopternodus	†C. gracilis	Chadronian	late Eocene	A micropternodontid (early mole-like mammal)	
†Domnina	†D. gradata	Chadronian - Whitneyan	late Eocene - "mid" Oligocene	A heterosoricine shrew	
†Domnina	†D. thompsoni	Chadronian	late Eocene	A heterosoricine shrew	
†Micropternodus	†M. borealis	Chadronian - Orellan	late Eocene - early Oligocene	A micropternodontid	
†Micropternodus	†M. montrosensis	Chadronian - Orellan	late Eocene - early Oligocene	A micropternodontid	
†Noritrimylus	†N. compressus	Chadronian - Orellan	late Eocene - early Oligocene	A heterosoricine shrew	
†Noritrimylus	†N. metaxy	Whitneyan	"mid" Oligocene	A heterosoricine shrew	
†Oligoryctes	†O. altitalonidus	Chadronian - Orellan	late Eocene - early Oligocene	An oligoryctid (shrew relative)	
†Oligoryctes	†O. cameronensis	Chadronian	late Eocene	An oligoryctid (shrew relative)	
†Oligoryctes	cf. †O. cameronensis	Chadronian	late Eocene	An oligoryctid (shrew relative)	
†Oligoryctes	†O. tenutalonidus	Chadronian	late Eocene	An oligoryctid (shrew relative)	
†Oligoscalops	†O. galbreathi	Chadronian - Orellan	late Eocene - early Oligocene	A proscalopid (early mole-like mammal)	
†Proscalops	†P. sp.	Chadronian - Whitneyan	late Eocene - "mid" Oligocene	A proscalopid	
†Proscalops	†P. tertius	Orellan - Whitneyan	early - "mid" Oligocene	A proscalopid	
†Proterix	†P. bicuspis	Whitneyan	"mid" Oligocene	An galericine (gymnure-like) erinaceid	
†Proterix	†P. loomisi	Whitneyan	"mid" Oligocene	An galericine (gymnure-like) erinaceid	
†Proterix	†P. minimus	Chadronian - Orellan	late Eocene - early Oligocene	An galericine (gymnure-like) erinaceid	

=== †Hyaenodonts ===
Genus	Species	NALMA	Epoch	Notes	Image
†Hyaenodon	†H. horridus		Eocene - Oligocene	A massive carnivorous hyaenodontid hyaenodont. The last and largest of the North American "creodonts"	

=== Lagomorphs ===
Genus	Species	NALMA	Epoch	Notes	Image
†Megalagus				A leporid (rabbit)	
†Palaeolagus				A lagomorph showing a combination of traits from rabbits and pikas.	

=== †Leptictids ===
Leptictids are an extinct group of mammals with an insectivorous diet, a flexible snout, and hopping adaptations.

Genus	Species	NALMA	Epoch	Notes	Image
†Blacktops	†B. sp.	Chadronian - Orellan	late Eocene - early Oligocene	A leptictid	
†Leptictis	†L. dakotensis	Chadronian - Whitneyan	late Eocene - "mid" Oligocene	A leptictid	
†Megaleptictis	†M. altidens	Chadronian? - Orellan	late Eocene? - early Oligocene	A large leptictid known from a complete skull with possible adaptations for herbivory.	

=== Metatherians ===
Genus	Species	NALMA	Epoch	Notes	Image
†Copedelphys	†C. stevensoni	Chadronian - Whitneyan	late Eocene - "mid" Oligocene	A herpetotheriid metatherian (opossum-like marsupial relative)	
†Herpetotherium	†H. fugax	Chadronian - Whitneyan	late Eocene - "mid" Oligocene	A herpetotheriid. The most abundant non-rodent species found in ant mounds.	
†Herpetotherium	†H. valens	Chadronian - Orellan	late Eocene - early Oligocene	A herpetotheriid.	
†Nanodelphys	†N. hunti	Chadronian - Whitneyan	late Eocene - "mid" Oligocene	A peradectid.	

=== †Palaeanodonta ===
Genus	Species	NALMA	Epoch	Notes	Image
†Epoicotherium	†E. unicum	Chadronian	late Eocene	An epoicotheriid (mole-like mammals potentially related to pangolins).	
†Xenocranium	†X. pileorivale	Chadronian	late Eocene	An epoicotheriid	

=== †Pantolestans ===
Genus	Species	NALMA	Epoch	Notes	Image
†Chadronia	†C. margaretae	Chadronian	late Eocene	A pantolestid (part of an extinct group of otter-like mammals)	
†Chadronia	†C. sp.	Orellan	early Oligocene	A pantolestid	
†Cymaprimadon	†C. kenni	Chadronian	late Eocene	A pantolestid	

=== Perissodactyls ===
==== †Brontotheres ====
Genus	Species	NALMA	Epoch	Notes	Image
†Megacerops		Chadronian	late Eocene	A giant brontothere	

==== Equids ====
Genus	Species	NALMA	Epoch	Notes	Image
†Mesohippus				A rather small three-toed equid (horse) with browsing habits	
†Miohippus				A three-toed equid (horse), around the size of a sheep	

==== Rhinocerotoids ====
Genus	Species	NALMA	Epoch	Notes	Image
†Amphicaenopus				A large hippo-like early rhinocerotid (rhinoceros)	
†Diceratherium				A medium-sized early rhinocerotid where the males bear a pair of small horns on their snout.	
†Hyracodon			Eocene - Oligocene	A hyracodontid ("running rhino")	
†Metamynodon				A large amynodontid (tusked hippo-like rhino)	
†Penetrigonias				A fairly small hornless early rhinocerotid	
†Subhyracodon				A medium-sized hornless early rhinocerotid	
†Trigonias				A medium-sized hornless early rhinocerotid	

==== Tapiroids ====
Genus	Species	NALMA	Epoch	Notes	Image
†Colodon				A small tapiroid (tapir relative)	
†Protapirus				An early tapirid (tapir)	

=== Primates ===
Taxon	Species	NALMA	Epoch	Notes	Image
†Chumashius	†C. sp.	Chadronian	late Eocene	An omomyid (tarsier relative)	
†Omomyidae	indet.	Chadronian	late Eocene	An indeterminate omomyid, similar to Chumashius but larger.	

=== Rodents ===
Modern ants often use tiny tooth fossils as grains when building their anthills, and rodent teeth are common at anthill sites close to the Chadronian-Orellan transition.

Genus	Species	NALMA	Epoch	Notes	Image
†Adjidaumo				An eomyid (extinct squirrel-like rodent)	
†Agnotocastor	†A. praeteredens (type); †A. coloradensis; †A. galushai; †A. readingi		late Eocene-Oligocene	A terrestrial early castorid (beaver)	
†Capacikala				A burrowing beaver	
†Cedromus				An early sciurid (squirrel)	
†Diplolophus				A zapodid (relative of jumping mice)	
†Eumys				A common cricetid (relative of hamsters and voles)	
†Eutypomys				A eutypomyid (beaver relative)	
†Heliscomys				A heliscomyid (small extinct relatives of pocket gophers and kangaroo rats)	
†Ischyromys				An ischyromyid (extinct early squirrel-like rodent)	
†Palaeocastor				A burrowing beaver	
†Paradjidaumo				An eomyid	
†Pelycomys				An allomyid (squirrel relative)	
†Plesiosminthus				A sicistid (birch mouse)	
†Proheteromys				A heteromyid (kangaroo rat)	
†Prosciurus				An aplodontiid (squirrel-like relative of the mountain beaver)	
†Protosciurus				An early squirrel	
†Scottimus				A cricetid	

== Reptiles ==
=== Crocodilians ===
Genus	Species	NALMA	Epoch	Notes	Image
Alligator	†A. prenasalis	Chadronian	late Eocene	The earliest known species of alligator.	

=== Lizards ===
Indeterminate iguanid, skink, and diploglossine (galliwasp) fossils are also known from the White River Group.

Genus	Species	NALMA	Epoch	Notes	Image
†Aciprion	†A. formosum	Orellan	early Oligocene	An iguanian related to crotaphytids (collared lizards).	
†Cremastosaurus	†C. carinicollis	Chadronian	late Eocene	A rare and enigmatic squamate based on vertebrae.	
†Cremastosaurus	†"C". rhambastes	Chadronian	late Eocene	A rare and enigmatic squamate based on vertebrae.	
†Cypressaurus	†C. sp.	Chadronian	late Eocene	A rare iguanid based on jaw fragments.	
†Exostinus	†E. serratus	Orellan	early Oligocene	A rare xenosaurid known from skull fragments.	
†Helodermoides	†H. tuberculatus	Chadronian - Orellan	late Eocene - early Oligocene	A glyptosaurine anguid (an armored lizard related to glass lizards and alligator lizards). Previously considered a species of Glyptosaurus.	
†Hyporhina	†H. antiqua	Orellan - Whitneyan	early - "mid" Oligocene	An amphisbaenian (worm lizard).	
†Hyporhina	†H. tertia	Chadronian	late Eocene	An amphisbaenian (worm lizard).	
†Lowesaurus	†L. matthewi	Orellan - Arikareean	Oligocene	A rare helodermatid (beaded lizard).	
†Palaeoxantusia	†P. cf. P. borealis	Chadronian	late Eocene	A xantusiid (night lizard).	
†Paraphrynosoma	†P. greeni	Orellan	early Oligocene	A rare iguanian known from a single jaw.	
†Parophisaurus	†P. pawneensis	Orellan	early Oligocene	An anguid related to Ophisaurus (eastern glass lizards).	
†Peltosaurus	†P. granulosus	Chadronian - Arikareean	late Eocene - late Oligocene	A common glyptosaurine anguid (an armored lizard related to glass lizards and alligator lizards).	
Polychrus	†P. charisticus	Chadronian	late Eocene	A rare polychrotine (bush anole) based on jaw fragments.	
Rhineura	†R. coloradoensis	Chadronian	late Eocene	A rhineurid amphisbaenian closely related to the Florida worm lizard (Rhineura floridana).	
Rhineura	†R. hatcherii	Orellan - Whitneyan	early - "mid" Oligocene	A rhineurid amphisbaenian closely related to the Florida worm lizard (Rhineura floridana).	
†Saniwa	†S. edura	Chadronian	late Eocene	A rare varanid based on jaw fragments.	
†Spathorhynchus	†S. natronicus	Chadronian	late Eocene	A rare rhineurid based on a single skull.	
†Tinosaurus	†T. sp.	Chadronian	late Eocene	A rare acrodontan based on jaw fragments.	
†Tuberculacerta	†T. pearsoni	Chadronian	late Eocene	A rare phrynosomatine (relative of fence lizards) based on jaw fragments.	

=== Snakes ===
Genus	Species	NALMA	Epoch	Notes	Image
†Boavus	†B. cf. occidentalis	Chadronian - Orellan	late Eocene - early Oligocene	A boine boid (true boa).	
†Calamagras	†C. angulatus	Orellan - Arikareean	Oligocene	An erycine boid (sand boa).	
†Calamagras	†C. murivorus	Orellan	early Oligocene	An erycine boid (sand boa).	
†Coprophis	†C. dakotaensis	Orellan	early Oligocene	A rare booid based on eroded fossils found within a mammal coprolite.	
†Geringophis	†G. vetus	Orellan	early Oligocene	An erycine boid (sand boa).	
†Helagras	†H. orellanensis	Orellan	early Oligocene	An erycine boid (sand boa).	
†Hibernophis	†H. breithaupti	Orellan	early Oligocene	A booid based on complete skeletons.	
†Texasophis	†T. galbreathi	Orellan	early Oligocene	A colubrid.	

=== Turtles ===
Indeterminate fossils of an anosteirine carettochelyid and a ptychogastrin geoemydid are also known from the White River Group.

Genus	Species	NALMA	Epoch	Notes	Image
Apalone	†A. leucopotamica	Chadronian - Orellan	late Eocene - early Oligocene	A trionychid (softshell turtle).	
Chrysemys	†C. antiqua	Chadronian - Whitneyan	late Eocene - "mid" Oligocene	An emydid (pond turtle), sometimes known as "Trachemys" antiqua. A potential relative of modern painted turtles (Chrysemys).	
cf. †Echmatemys	cf. †E. sp.	Chadronian	late Eocene	A "batagurid" (geoemydid) similar to Echmatemys.	
Gopherus	†G. laticuneus	Chadronian - Whitneyan	late Eocene - "mid" Oligocene	A gopher tortoise in the subgenus Oligopherus. Gopherus fossils are also known from the Whitneyan.	
†Hesperotestudo	†H. brontops	Chadronian	late Eocene	A testudinid (tortoise). Hesperotestudo-like fossils are also known from the Whitneyan.	
†Pseudograptemys	†P. inornata	Chadronian	late Eocene	An emydid (pond turtle) closely related to Graptemys (map turtles).	
Rafetus	†R. lyonsi	Orellan - Whitneyan	early - "mid" Oligocene	A trionychid (softshell turtle).	
†Stylemys	†S. amphithorax	Chadronian	late Eocene	A common testudinid (tortoise) related to gopher tortoises (Gopherus). Probably survived into the Whitneyan in the White River area.	
†Stylemys	†S. nebrascensis	Chadronian - Orellan	late Eocene - early Oligocene	A common testudinid (tortoise) related to gopher tortoises (Gopherus). Probably survived into the Whitneyan in the White River area.	
†Xenochelys	†X. formosa	Chadronian	late Eocene	A kinosternid (mud turtle).	

== Amphibians ==
Genus	Species	NALMA	Epoch	Notes	Image
†Eopelobates	†E. grandis	Chadronian	late Eocene	A pelobatid frog related to Pelobates (the European spadefoot toads).	

== Fish ==
Indeterminate gar (Lepisosteus sp.) and bowfin (Amia sp.) fossils are occasionally found in the White River Group.

Genus	Species	NALMA	Epoch	Notes	Image
Ictalurus	†I. geraldsmithi	Whitneyan	"mid" Oligocene	An exceptionally-preserved ictalurid catfish	

== See also ==
- Category:White River Fauna
