= Orellan =

North American faunal stage

The Orellan is a North American Land Mammal Age typically set from around 33,700,000 to 32,000,000 years BP, a period of 1.7 million years. The Orellan is preceded by the Chadronian and followed by the Whitneyan NALMA stages. Relative to global geological chronology (the geologic time scale), it is usually considered to fall within the earliest part (early Rupelian stage) of the Oligocene epoch, beginning around the same time as the Eocene-Oligocene boundary.

The beginning of the Orellan is defined by the first appearance of Hypertragulus calcaratus (a hypertragulid ruminant). Other mammal species which first appear at the start of the stage include Leptomeryx evansi (a leptomerycid ruminant) and Palaeolagus intermedius (an early lagomorph). Poebrotherium eximium (an early camelid) and Miohippus grandis (an early horse) last appear around the base of the Orellan, and brontotheres go extinct only shortly above the base.

Orellan North America was cooler and drier than previous ages, though the middle of the continent was still a stable environment populated by the White River fauna. The Great Plains and Rocky Mountain regions were covered by temperate deciduous and conifer woodlands rather than the humid subtropical floras which characterized the Eocene.

== Subdivisions ==
The Orellan is considered to contain the following four subdivisions, from oldest to youngest:

- Orellan 1: Starting at the first appearance of Hypertragulus calcaratus and ending at the first appearance of Miniochoerus affinis.
- Orellan 2: Starting at the first appearance of Miniochoerus affinis and ending at the first appearance of Miniochoerus gracilis.
- Orellan 3: Starting at the first appearance of Miniochoerus gracilis and ending at the first appearance of Merycoidodon bullatus.
- Orellan 4: Starting at the first appearance of Merycoidodon bullatus and ending at the first appearance of Leptauchenia major.

== Fossil localities ==
The Orellan is named after the Orella Member of the Brule Formation, a widespread subunit of the White River Group.

- Colorado:
  - White River Formation (Cedar Creek Member)
- Mississippi:
  - Byram Formation
- Montana:
  - Clarkston Basin, Three Forks Basin, South Townsend Basin, Jefferson Basin: Dunbar Creek Formation (= Renova Formation Dunbar Creek Member) (Easter Lily local fauna)
  - Sage Creek Basin: Cook Ranch Formation (= Renova Formation Cook Ranch Member) (Cook Ranch, Matador Ranch local faunas)
- Nebraska:
  - White River Group: Brule Formation (Orella Member B-D)
- North Dakota:
  - White River Group: Brule Formation
- Saskatchewan:
  - Cypress Hills Formation (Fossil Bush local fauna)
- South Dakota:
  - White River Group: Brule Formation (Scenic Member)
- Wyoming:
  - White River Group: Brule Formation (Orella Member)
  - White River Formation
  - Tepee Trail Formation (Hendry Ranch Member) (Cedar Ridge local fauna)
