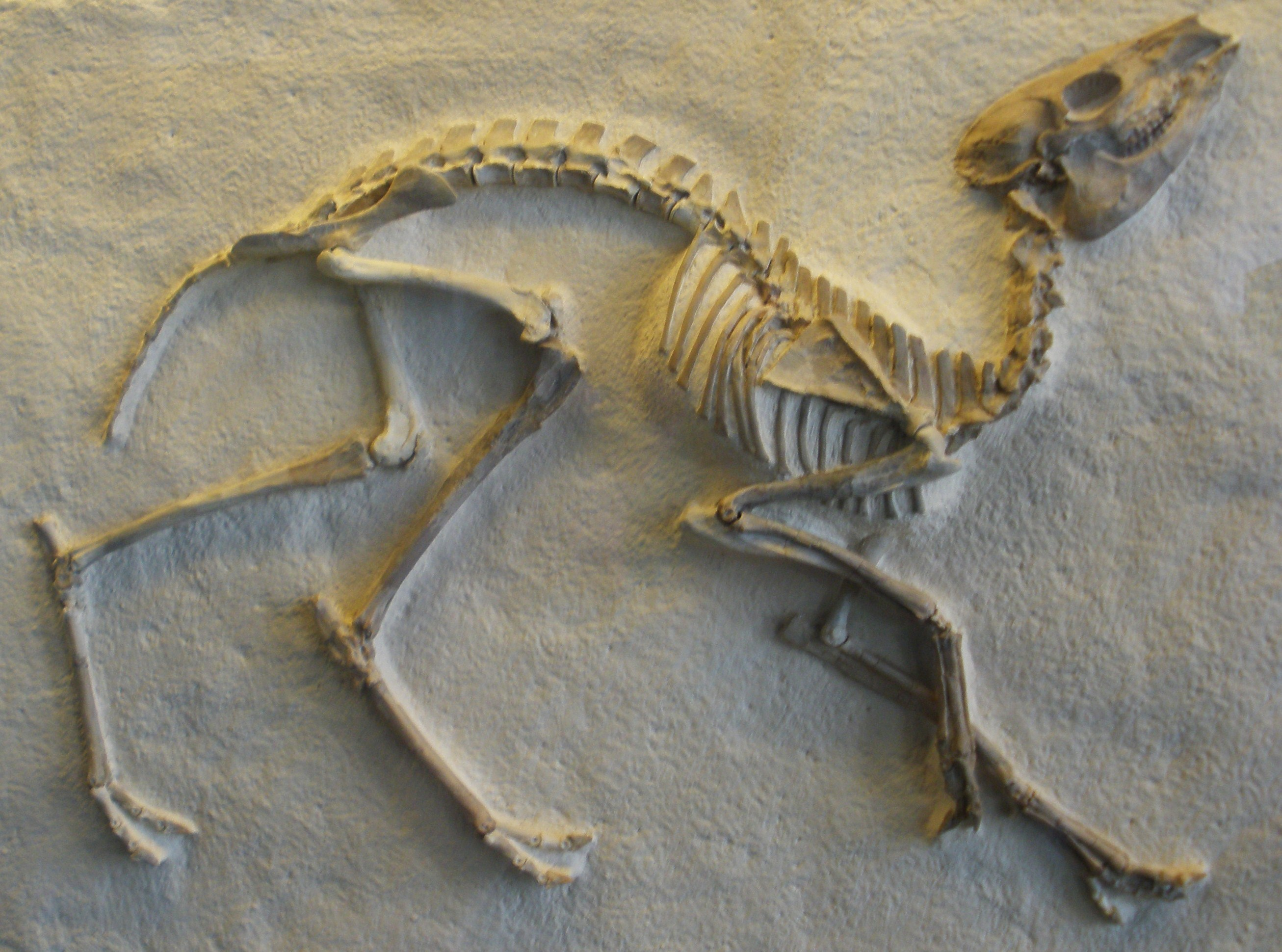
- Skeleton, Paleontology Museum of Zurich

Scientific classification
- Kingdom: Animalia
- Phylum: Chordata
- Class: Mammalia
- Order: Artiodactyla
- Family: †Leptomerycidae
- Subfamily: †Leptomerycinae
- Genus: †Leptomeryx; Leidy, 1853

Type species
- †Leptomeryx evansi

Species
- †L. blacki; †L. evansi; †L. mammifer; †L. obliquidens; †L. speciosus; †L. yoderi

= Leptomeryx =

Leptomeryx Temporal range: middle Eocene to early Miocene, 45–20 Ma

Extinct genus of mammals

Leptomeryx is an extinct genus of artiodactyl that lived in North America during the middle Eocene through early Miocene. One of the earliest ruminants, it belongs to the extinct family Leptomerycidae, which is related to today's chevrotains. Most fossils were found in the badlands of the Midwestern United States in sedimentary rocks of the White River Group, in the Brule and Chadron formations. Additional remains have been reported from southern Canada and Mexico. The genus was scientifically described in 1853 by Joseph Leidy and includes several species.

Leptomeryx was a cat-sized animal with a short neck and long and slender limbs. The hind limbs were much longer than the forelimbs. The upper canine tooth was not enlarged, in contrast to chevrotains. The animal probably lived in herds and feed on soft plants. During the late Eocene, the genus probably lived in forests. During the early Oligocene, it adapted to the open habitats hat became prevalent at that time and became one of the most common artiodactyls.

== Taxonomy ==
=== Research history ===
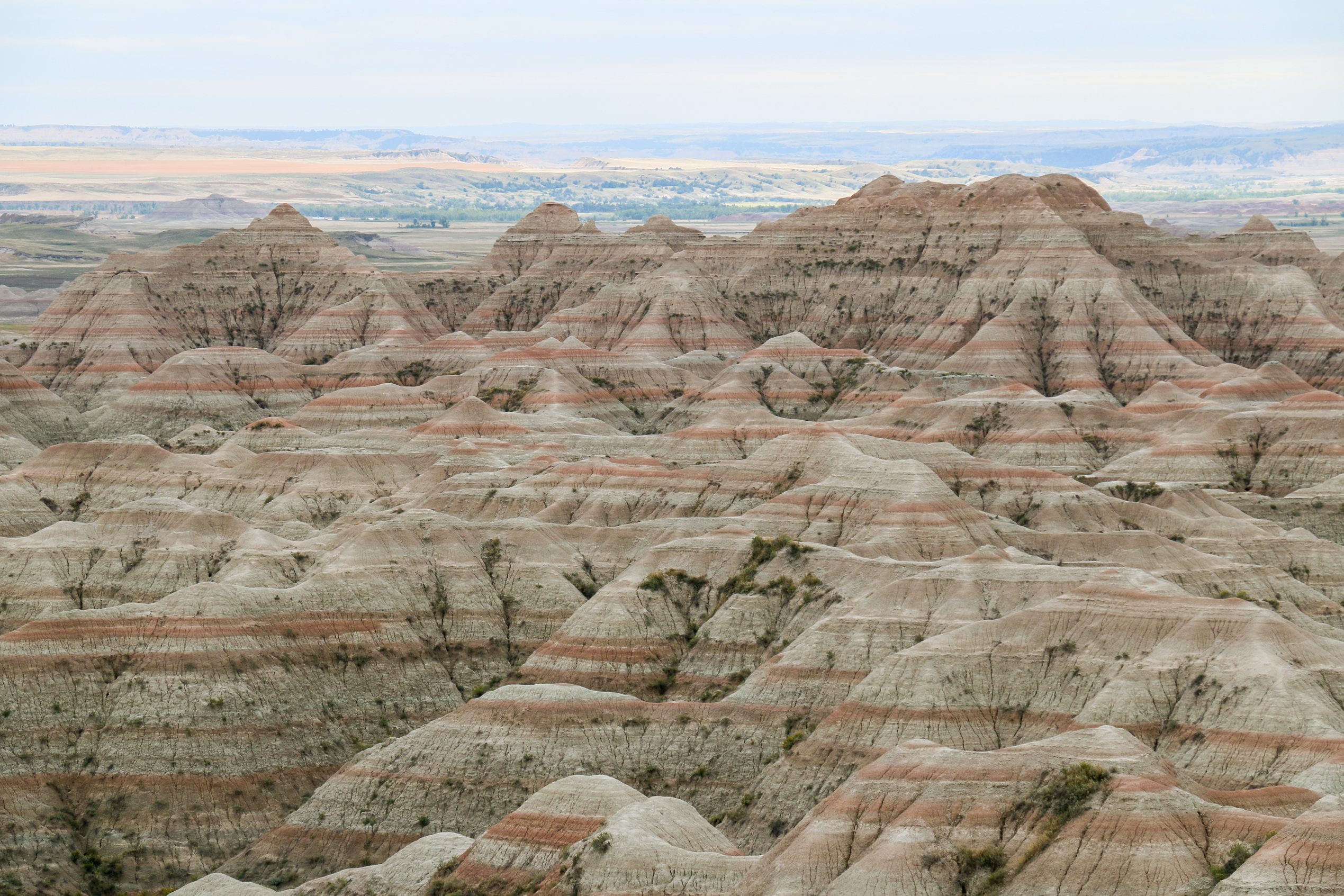
Outcrops of the Scenic Member of the Brule Formation, in which Leptomeryx is the most common fossil mammal, in Badlands National Park in South Dakota

The first fossils from the badlands of South Dakota were collected by trappers in the 1840s and soon sparkled the interest of scientists. From 1849, John Evans, an assistant of David Dale Owen, conducted expeditions into the badlands and forwarded collected fossils to Joseph Leidy from the Academy of Natural Sciences of Philadelphia. Among these fossils was a fragmentary skull of a ruminant (specimen number USNM 157), which is now thought to come from the Brule Formation and is therefore early Oligocene in age. In 1853, Leidy scientifically described this skull as a new genus and species, Leptomeryx evansi, which at that time was the oldest known ruminant from North America. Leidy noted similarities with chevrotains and compared it with the Java mouse-deer. The genus name Leptomeryx is derived from the Ancient Greek words λεπτός (leptos) meaning 'slender' or 'small' and μήρυξ (meryx) meaning 'ruminant'. The specific name evansi honors Evans.

In 1869, Leidy provided a more comprehensive treatment of the skull in his second monograph on the fossil fauna of the badlands, in which he reaffirmed its close relationships to chevrotains. Ludwig Rütimeyer instead suggested a closer relationship with camels in 1881, while Max Schlosser supported Leidy's interpretation in 1887. Beginning in the 1870s, mayor American museums excavated in the badlands, leading to a surge in fossil discoveries, including of Leptomeryx. In 1884, Edward Drinker Cope described the foot anatomy of the genus, and William Berryman Scott presented a detailed account of the entire skeleton in 1891, supporting the close relationship with chevrotains. In 1886, John Bell Hatcher, one of the fossil collectors of Othniel Charles Marsh from the Yale Peabody Museum, started collecting in the badlands. In 1940, Scott published a second detailed account about Leptomeryx.

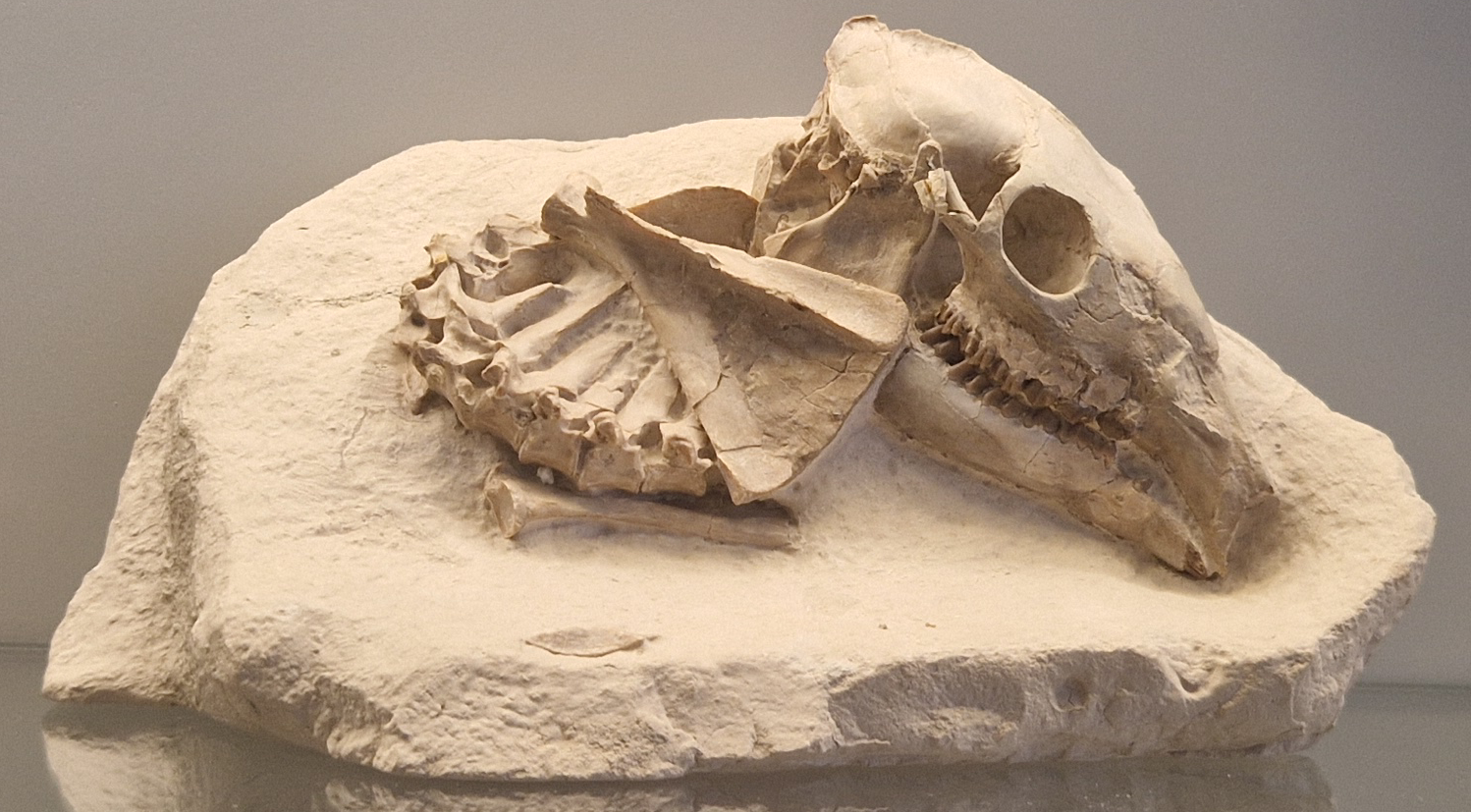
Skull of Leptomeryx from the White River Formation

In 1873, Cope described a skull from the Great Plains of Colorado under the name Trimerodus cedrensis. One year later, he declared this species as a synonym of Leptomeryx evansi, which was followed by other authors. In 1922, Richard Swann Lull described a second species, L. obliquidens, based on a poorly preserved skull from Hermosa, South Dakota. Harold J. Cook named several additional species in 1934, of which only one, L. exilis, is still accepted. Both L. obliquidens and L. exilis date to the early Oligocene. In 1935, Erich Maren Schlaikjer described L. yoderi based on a mandible from Goshen County, Wyoming, that dates to the late Eocene. In 1885, Cope expanded the known range of the genus north to Saskatchewan, Canada, when he described a mandible from the Cypress Hills Formation in Assiniboia as L. mammifer. From the same region, Lawrence Morris Lambe named L. speciosus in 1908 based on teeth. In the later 1960s, a mandible of the genus was documented from the Rancho Gaitan local fauna in Chihuahua in northern Mexico, marking the southernmost occurrence of the genus known at the time. Almost 50 years later, Leptomeryx was discovered even further south, in the north of Oaxaca, Mexico, in the Yolomécatl Formation.

=== Systematics and species ===
In 1893, Karl Alfred von Zittel classified Leptomeryx within the new subfamily Leptomerycinae, within the family Tragulidae, the chevrotains. Although William Berryman Scott elevated the group to family level (as Leptomerycidae), subsequent authors continued to use the group at subfamily level. Henry Fairfield Osborn classified the subfamily within the extinct family Hypertragulidae in 1910, which was followed by Scott in a 1940 monograph. In a 1945 publication by George Gaylord Simpson, the group was only recognised at the level of a tribe. It was only in 1955 that C. Lewis Gazin differentiated the group from the Hypertragulidae and established Leptomerycidae as a family of its own.

Leptomerycids are classified within ruminants but outside of Pecora (horn bearers), and only occurred in North America from the middle Eocene to the early Miocene. They did not possess horns, and their skulls were relatively flat, long-snouted, and lacked upper incisors.

The species L. elissae was named by William W. Korth and Margaret E. Diamond in 2002 based on numerous mandibles from the Brule Formation of Nebraska, but moved into its own genus, Santuccimeryx, in 2023. Another species, L. minimus, is possibly identical with L. exilis, while L. lenis is probably a synonym of L. evansi.

Two evolutionary lines can be distinguished within the genus: The first line leads begins with L. yoderi, leading to L. mammifer and L. exilis, and finally to L. obliquidens. The second line leads from L. speciosus to L. evansi. Both lines existed from the late Eocene until the Oligocene. They differ in the shape of the entoconid, a cusp of the lower molars, which is conical in the first line but cylindrical in the second line. The L. yoderi-L. mammifer-L. exilis-L. obliquidens line showed a fluctuation in body size; size increased from L. yoderi to L. mammifer, decreased from L. mammifer to L. exilis, and increased from L. exilis to L. obliquidens. The second line showed a continuous reduction in body size, which probably culminated in the genus Santuccimeryx. The second line might also include L. agatensis, although this species is often assigned to Pronodens, a successor of Leptomeryx. The position of another closely related genus, Hendryomeryx, is uncertain. Described in 1978, Hendryomeryx combines several species, some of which were initially assigned to Leptomeryx. Some authors consider Hendryomeryx as a synonym of Leptomeryx, while others see it as a predecessor of Leptomeryx.

A 2023 study by Mattison Shreero and colleagues recognizes the following species:

- L. evansi, the type species, named by Leidy in 1853. This is the by far most common species; in some collections it is 50 times more common than the other species.
- L. exilis, named by Cook in 1934 based on a mandible fragment from the lower Oligocene of the Brule Formation near Chadron, Nebraska. This was a small species.
- L. mammifer, named by Cope in 1885 based on teeth from the Cypress Hills Formation, Assiniboia, Saskatchewan.
- L. obliquidens, named by Lull in 1922 from the lower Oligocene of South Dakota. This was a very large form.
- L. speciosus, named by Lambe in 1908 based on isolated teeth from the Cypress Hills Formation of southern Saskatchewan.
- L. yoderi, named by Schlaikjer in 1935 based on a mandible and teeth from the upper Eocene of Wyoming.

This cladogram shows the relationships within Leptomerycidae according to Shreero and colleagues, 2023

- Leptomerycidae
  - Hendryomeryx
  - Leptomeryx
    - - L. yoderi
      - - L. mammifer
        - - L. exilis
          - L. obliquidens
    - - L. speciosus
      - - L. evansi
        - - Santuccimeryx
          - Pseudoparablastomeryx

== Description ==
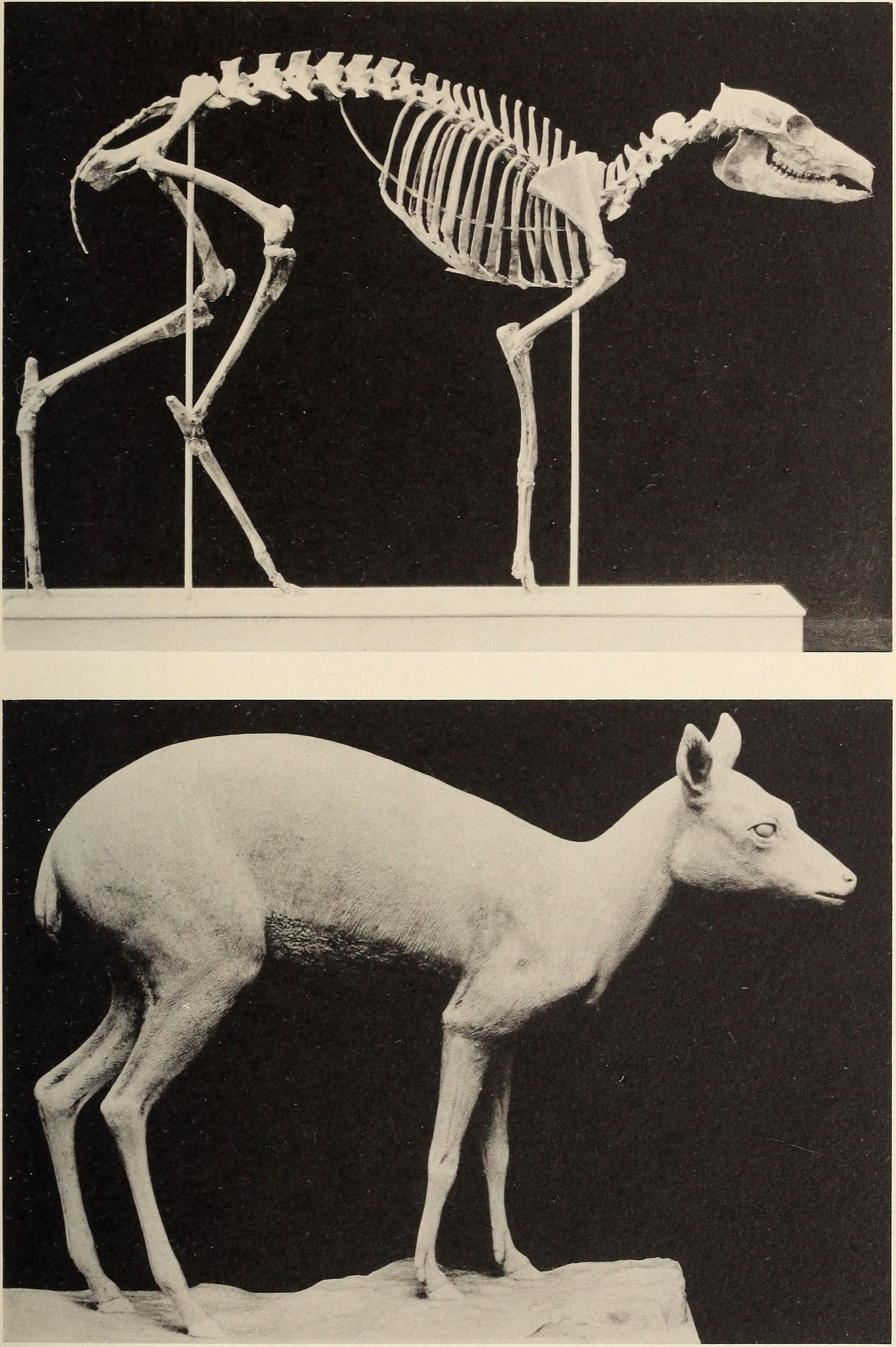
1941 skeletal and life reconstructions

Leptomeryx was a small, cat-sized artiodactyl that weighed approximately 2.5 kg (5.5 lb). The genus probably resembled modern chevrotains, and had long and slender limbs, with the hind limbs being much longer than the forelimbs. The neck was relatively short, and the trunk was elongated, especially in the lumbar area. The tail was short. Thanks to numerous excavated skeletons, the anatomy of the genus is well known.

=== Skull and dentition ===
Only few well-preserved skulls are known. The skull was around 10.7 cm (4.2 in) in length, and about 3.3 cm (1.3 in) wide at the braincase and 5.0 cm (2.0 in) at the eye sockets. Overall, the skull was elongated and flattened. Its upper surface was slightly vaulted, so that the muzzle and the rear of the skull roof were lower than the middle part. The muzzle was long and therefore resembled that of camels more than the shorter muzzle seen in chevrotains. In top view, the muzzle was wider than in Hypertragulus and continuously tapered towards its tip, lacking the constriction in its middle section that is seen in the latter genus. The eye sockets were positioned relatively high on the skull's side, approximately at mid-length of the skull, and were proportionally larger than in Hypertragulus. The skull roof had a low sagittal crest that was longer than in Hypertragulus. The tympanic bullae at the base of the skull were hollow and small, but larger than in Hypertragulus. The soft and bony portions of the palate were separated by a ridge, which was absent in Hypertragulus. The lower jaw was about 8.9 cm (3.5 in) in length; its horizontal part was slender and low, and its lower margin was straight. The symphysis (where the two halves of the lower jaw fuse) was expanded. The ramus, the rising branch at the rear of the lower jaw, was high and curved backwards, in contrast to Hypertragulus.

The dentition consisted of a total of 36 teeth. The dental formula, which shows the number of incisors, canines, premolars, and molars in both the upper and lower jaws, was 0.1.3.33.1.4.3. As in many other ruminants, the upper incisors were missing or rudimentary. The upper canine tooth was also small and probably functionless. Male chevrotains and Hypertragulus, in contrast, have an extremely large upper canine. There was a large gap (diastema) between the canine and the first premolar that measured almost 2 cm (0.79 in). In the lower jaw, the frontmost incisor was much larger than the other incisors. The canine tooth resembled the incisors (incisiform), and was directly adjoining the latter. The premolars and molars formed a continuous tooth row in the upper jaw. In the lower jaw, the first premolar was isolated from neighboring teeth by small gaps and shaped like a canine tooth (caniniform), a characteristic feature of Leptomeryx. The upper premolars were small, while the lower premolars were larger, more complex, and had a pointed main cusp. The molars were low-crowned (brachyodont), and their grinding surfaces had sickle-shaped ridges (selenodont). Compared to Hypertragulus, the molars were broader and lower. In the upper jaw, the row of premolars and molars was about 3.7 cm (1.5 in) in length, more than half of which was occupied by the molars. In the lower jaw, it was about 4.7 cm (1.9 in) in length, to which molars and premolars contributed equally.

=== Postcranium ===
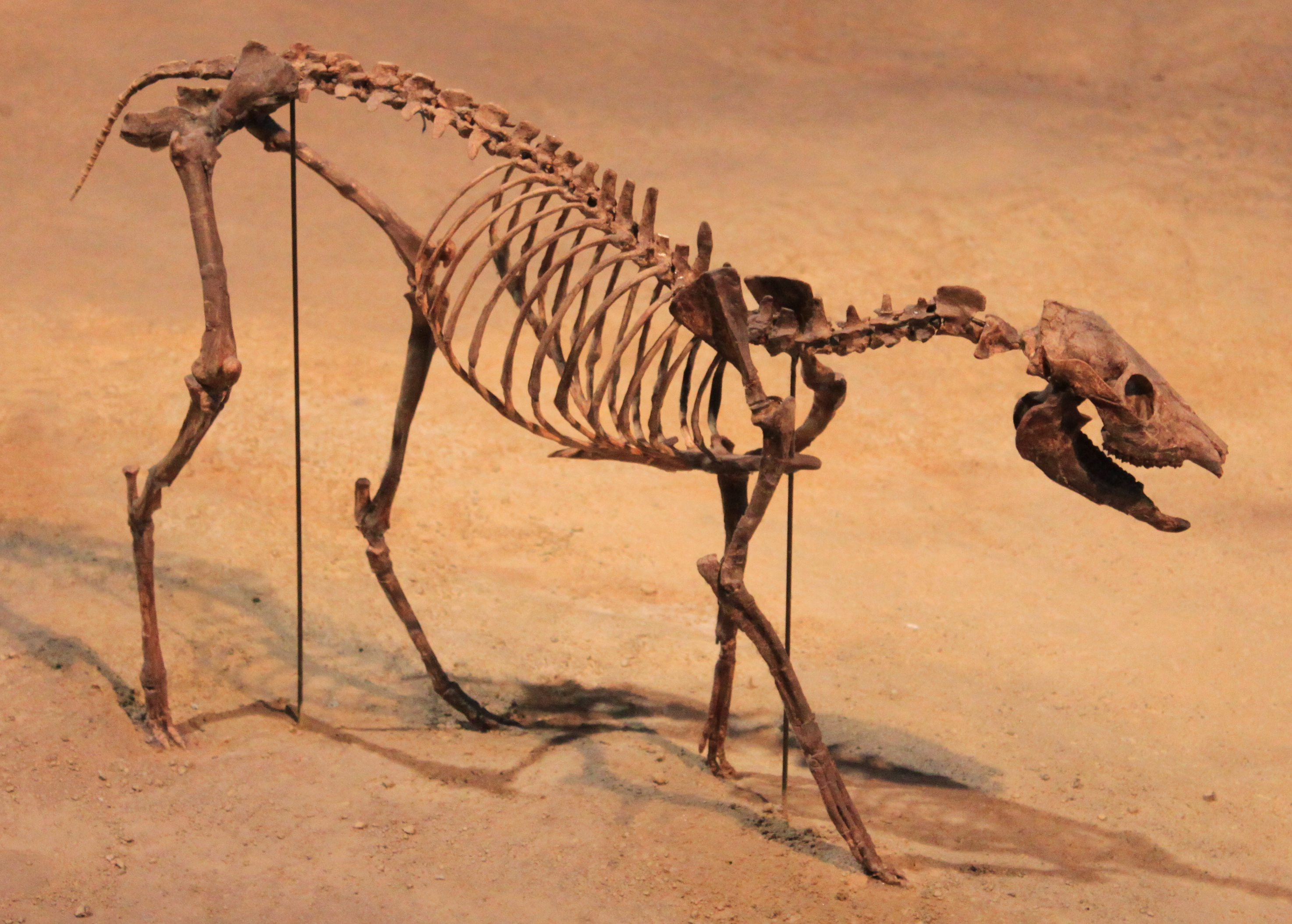
Mounted skeleton

The vertebral column consisted of 7 neck, 13 thoracic, 4 lumbar, and 4 sacral vertebrae. Tail vertebrae are rarely preserved, but up to 8 are present in individual specimens. The humerus (upper arm bone) was relatively short with a large head. In the forearm, the radius and ulna were still separated, different from Hypertragulus. The radius reached almost the length of the humerus. The front foot had four digits (II–V), with the innermost digit (I) missing. The central digits (III and IV) were robust, while the outer digits (II and IV) were slender. The hind limbs were long and slender; the tibia (shin bone) was the longest element. The upper end of the fibula was fused to the tibia, while in Hypertragulus the entire fibula was fused. The hind foot had two digits (III and IV), and the metatarsals were fused to a single element known as the cannon bone.

== Paleobiology and paleoecology ==
=== Population dynamics and life history ===
Leptomeryx is a common fossil in the badlands of the White River Group. Fossils of more than 440 individuals, including nearly complete skeletons, have been excavated from the Lower Nodular zone of the Scenic Member of the Brule Formation alone. In a 1970 study, John Clark and Thomas Guensburg interpreted the concentrated occurrences of Leptomeryx fossils as mass death assemblages, in which carcasses were buried in place rather than having been transported by water, and that assemblages at particular localities represented particular times of the year. Clark and Guensburg concluded that there was a fixed breeding season, and that females usually produced one young per season. They also estimated that the gestation period lasted between 120 and 160 days, that the offspring was fully grown at six to eight months of age, and that the life expectancy was around eight years. One block containing multiple skeletons has been interpreted as evidence for gregariousness (living in herds).

=== Habitat ===
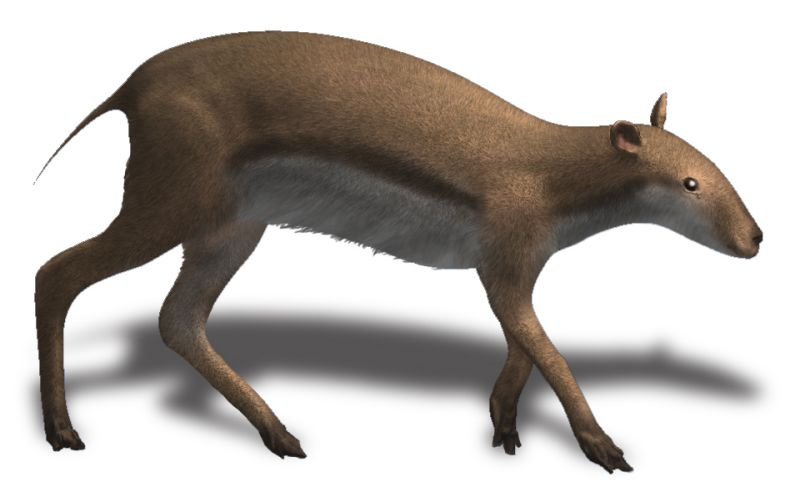
Hypothetical life restoration of Leptomeryx

Leptomeryx populations from the Brule Formation probably inhabited grassland or savanna. These open habitats became increasingly common during the Oligocene due to a gradual change towards dryer climates. In the open habitats of the Brule Formation, the genus was the most common mammal, comprising around 30% of all mammal specimens. With its long limbs and two-toed hind feet, Leptomeryx was cursorial (well-adapted for running), which was an advantage in open habitats. Despite its abundance, a cursorial predator was evidently absent, though ambush predators such as Daphoenus and short-distance sprinters such as Hyaenodon might have preyed on it. Besides savanna, the Brule Formation landscape also comprised swamps. These were also inhabited by Leptomeryx, although with a reduced abundance (23% of specimens). In the gallery forests of the formation, the genus is uncommon; instead, medium-sized artiodactyls such as Merycoidodon were common. Outside of the badlands, Leptomeryx is also known from more forested habitats, such as from the Yolomécatl Formation in southeast Mexico, which dates to the late Eocene. Earlier members of the genus might have been better adapted to forested habitats, and adapted to open habitats only during the Oligocene.

=== Diet ===
The shift from forested to open landscapes at the transition from the Eocene to the Oligocene is also reflected in the diet. The dentition suggests that Leptomeryx was a browser that was specialized on soft plant matter such as leaves and fruit. Analyses of carbon isotopes in teeth from the Yolomécatl Formation showed that it preferred C3 plants; similar results were obtained from the older deposits of the badlands. In younger deposits in the badlands, Leptomeryx teeth show a pronounced shift towards C4 plants. Oxygen isotopes in teeth furthermore suggest that Leptomeryx might have been nocturnal.

== Distribution ==
Leptomeryx was widely distributed in North America. Most fossils come from badlands of South Dakota, Nebraska, and Wyoming, in particular in the Chadron and Brule formations of the White River Group. Both formations contain a diverse fossil fauna including plants, invertebrates, fishes, amphibians, reptiles, birds, and mammals. Mammals include several species of artiodactyls, perissodactyls, insectivorans, carnivorans, marsupials, as well as the extinct Leptictida and Pantolesta. The White River Group is also exposed in Colorado, where Leptomeryx has also been found. Much further north, the genus occurs in southwestern Saskatchewan, Canada, in the Cypress Hills Formation. The southernmost locality is the Yolomécatl Formation in the northwest of Oaxaca, Mexico.
