= Aciprion =

Aciprion Temporal range: Oligocene

Scientific classification
- Kingdom: Animalia
- Phylum: Chordata
- Class: Reptilia
- Order: Squamata
- Suborder: Iguania
- Family: Iguanidae
- Genus: †Aciprion; Cope, 1873

Type species
- †Aciprion formosum Cope, 1873

Synonyms
- A. majus Gilmore, 1928

Extinct genus of lizards

Aciprion is an extinct genus of lizard from the Middle Oligocene of Colorado, Wyoming and Nebraska. It was named in 1873 by American paleontologist Edward Drinker Cope for a jaw fragment from the Cedar Creek Member of the White River Formation in Colorado, as the binomial A. formosum. Multiple additional specimens have been referred to the genus, including the second species A. majus named by Gilmore in 1928 for a partial skull. However, the differences between A. formosum and A. majus relate to slight size differences, so A. majus is considered a junior synonym of A. formosum. Cope originally named Aciprion as a genus of teiid lizard, but Gilmore reclassified it as a member of Iguanidae.
