= Brule Formation =

Rock formation in the western United States

- Stratigraphic range: Rupelian; ~33–30 Ma
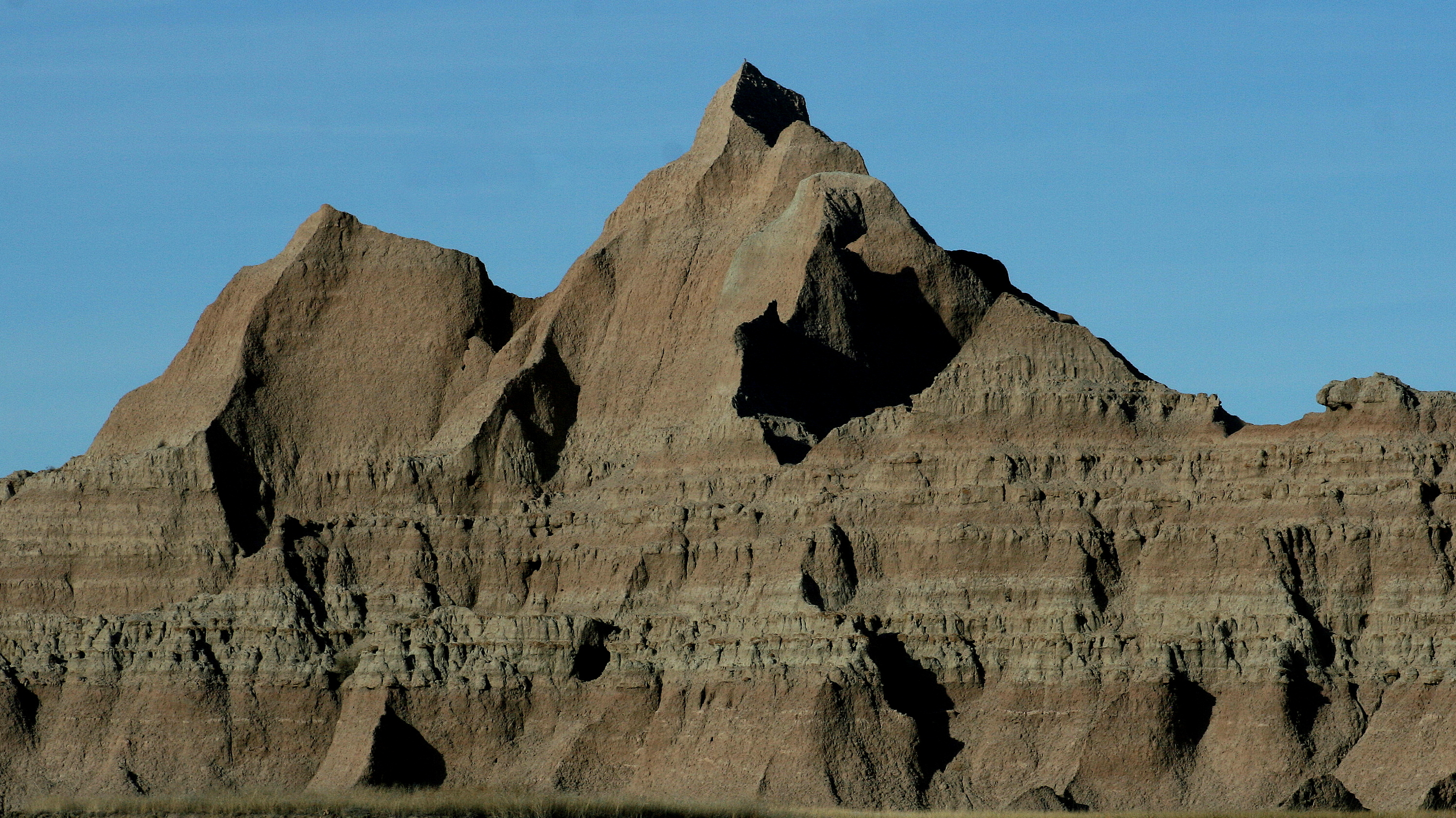
- Brule Formation in Badlands National Park
- Type: Geological formation
- Unit of: White River Group
- Underlies: Sharps Formation, Arikaree Formation
- Overlies: Chadron Formation
- Thickness: 6–65 metres (20–213 ft)

Lithology
- Primary: Fine grained clastic rocks
- Other: Freshwater limestone, tuff, sandstone

Location
- Region: South Dakota, Nebraska, North Dakota, Colorado, Wyoming
- Country: United States

The Brule Formation is a sequence of fine grained clastic rocks (claystones, mudstones, siltstones) interbedded with freshwater carbonates, volcanic ash (tuff), and sandstonein South Dakota, Nebraska, Colorado, North Dakota, and Wyoming. It was deposited between 34 and 30 million years ago, roughly the Rupelian age (Oligocene). It occurs as a subunit of the White River Group.

== Historical description ==
The formation was named by N. H. Darton "for the Brule Indians, who once roamed over Pine Rldge Ind. Res. in southern S. Dak., where the fm. covers large areas, and that it is not present in Brule Ind. Res., which occurs farther NE In S. Dak." Darton's first description stated, "The White River beds In their extension from S. Dak. Into Nebr. present some differences in strat. range and relations. They expand considerably and include, at top, beds which appear not to be represented in the typical regions. Accordingly, to afford distinct definitions for the members in Nebr. I have Introduced the designation Brule clay and separated the underlying Titanotherium beds as Chadron fm. The Brule consists mainly of a hard, sandy clay, of pale-pink color. Thickness about 600 ft. In vicinity of Wyo. line, but diminishes greatly eastward; in vicinity of 103° mer. in NW. comer of Nebr. it is 320 ft. Has not been recognized E. of long. 101°30', where it appears to sink beneath the surface In Platte Valley. Extends far to NB. in So. Dak. Is upper fm. of White River group." N. H. Darton, 1898 (D, 8, G, S, 19th Ann, Eept., p t 4, pp. 736, 766–759). (Abbreviations are in source document.)

== Fossil record ==
The sandstones layers, which are up to 3 metres (9.8 ft) thick, can contain mammalian fossils (e.g. the Fitterer bed). The most important fossils sites are:

- Fitterer Ranch
- Obritsch Ranch
- M&M Ranch
- Little Badlands in Stark County, ND
- Chalky Buttes (including White Butte) in Slope County, ND

Prehistoric catfish, several mammals such as nimravids and Hesperocyon, and sunfish fossils are known from the Brule Formation in Badlands National Park.

Notable among the local fauna are Bathornithid birds, ranging from the highly varied wetland-dwelling Bathornis species to the gigantic Paracrax.

=== Fauna ===
Fauna reported from the Brule Formation
Genus	Species	Location	Stratigraphic position	Material	Description	Images
Proscalops	Proscalps tertius			Numerous, including upper incisor and molar.	Species holotype likely located here.	
Hesperocyon	H. gregarius					
Hyaenodon	H. horridus					
Hyracodon	H. nebraskensis	SD, ND, NE		Jaw fragments, skulls	Early rhinoceros	
Subhyracodon	S. occidentalis	NE, SD, ND, WY		Teeth and skulls	Early rhinoceros	
Eporeodon	E. major	SD		Incredibly rare	Large oredodont	
Leptauchenia	L. decora	SD, NE		Teeth and skulls	Small Oreodont	
Merycoidodon	M. culbertsoni; M. gracilis	SD, ND, NE, WY		Skulls, limb bones, and skeletons	Oreodont	
Poebrotherium	P. wilsoni	SD, ND, NE, WY		Bones, jaw fragments	Early camel	
Leptomeryx		SD, NE, WY		Teeth	Deer-like mammal	
Archaeotherium	A. mortoni	WY		Teeth and skulls	Entelodont	

== See also ==
- Paleogene paleontological sites of North America
- Paleogene United States
- Pawnee Buttes
- White River Formation fossil record fauna
