= Apternodus =

Apternodus Temporal range: Middle Eocene–Early Oligocene (Duchesnean–Orellan)

Scientific classification
- Kingdom: Animalia
- Phylum: Chordata
- Class: Mammalia
- Order: Lipotyphla
- Family: †Apternodontidae
- Genus: †Apternodus; Matthew, 1903

Extinct genus of eulipotyphlan

Apternodus is an extinct genus of eulipotyphlan mammal from the Middle Eocene (Duchesnean) to Early Oligocene (Orellan) of North America. It was one of the most common and widespread eulipotyphlans of its time, ranging from shrew-sized to hedgehog-sized. In life it would have looked similar to a small solenodon, with a long sensitive snout indicated by muscle attachments on the skull. Also like solenodons, Apternodus has zalambdodont upper molar teeth (with a V-shaped shearing crest and no metacone). As with most other zalambdodont insectivores of Paleogene North America, its closest living relatives are probably shrews.

== List of species ==
- A. baladontus Asher et al., 2002
- A. brevirostris Schlaikjer, 1934
- A. dasophylakas Asher et al., 2002
- A. gregoryi Schlaikjer, 1933
- A. iliffensis Galbreath, 1953
- A. major Asher et al., 2002
- A. mediaevus Matthew, 1903 (type species)
