= Cedromus =

Cedromus Temporal range: Palaeogene

Scientific classification
- Domain: Eukaryota
- Kingdom: Animalia
- Phylum: Chordata
- Class: Mammalia
- Order: Rodentia
- Family: Sciuridae
- Genus: †Cedromus; Wilson, 1949

Type species
- Cedromus wardi Wilson, 1949

Other species
- Cedromus modicus; Cedromus savannae; Cedromus wilsoni

Extinct genus of rodents

Cedromus is an extinct genus of sciurid rodent that lived during the Eocene and Oligocene epochs.

== Distribution ==
Cedromus wilsoni is known from Orellan fossil deposits in Converse County, Wyoming.

== Description ==
Cedromus wilsoni had a greater neocortical surface area, especially in the caudal region of its cerebrum, as compared to ischyromyids such as Ischyromys typus, as well as proportionally larger paraflocculi and a more complex cerebellum. It possessed an encephalisation quotient comparable to that of modern terrestrial squirrels, being higher than that of I. typus but lower than that of scansorial, arboreal, and gliding sciurids.
