= Arikaree Formation =

Geological formation in midwestern US

- Stratigraphic range: late Oligocene to earlyMiocene
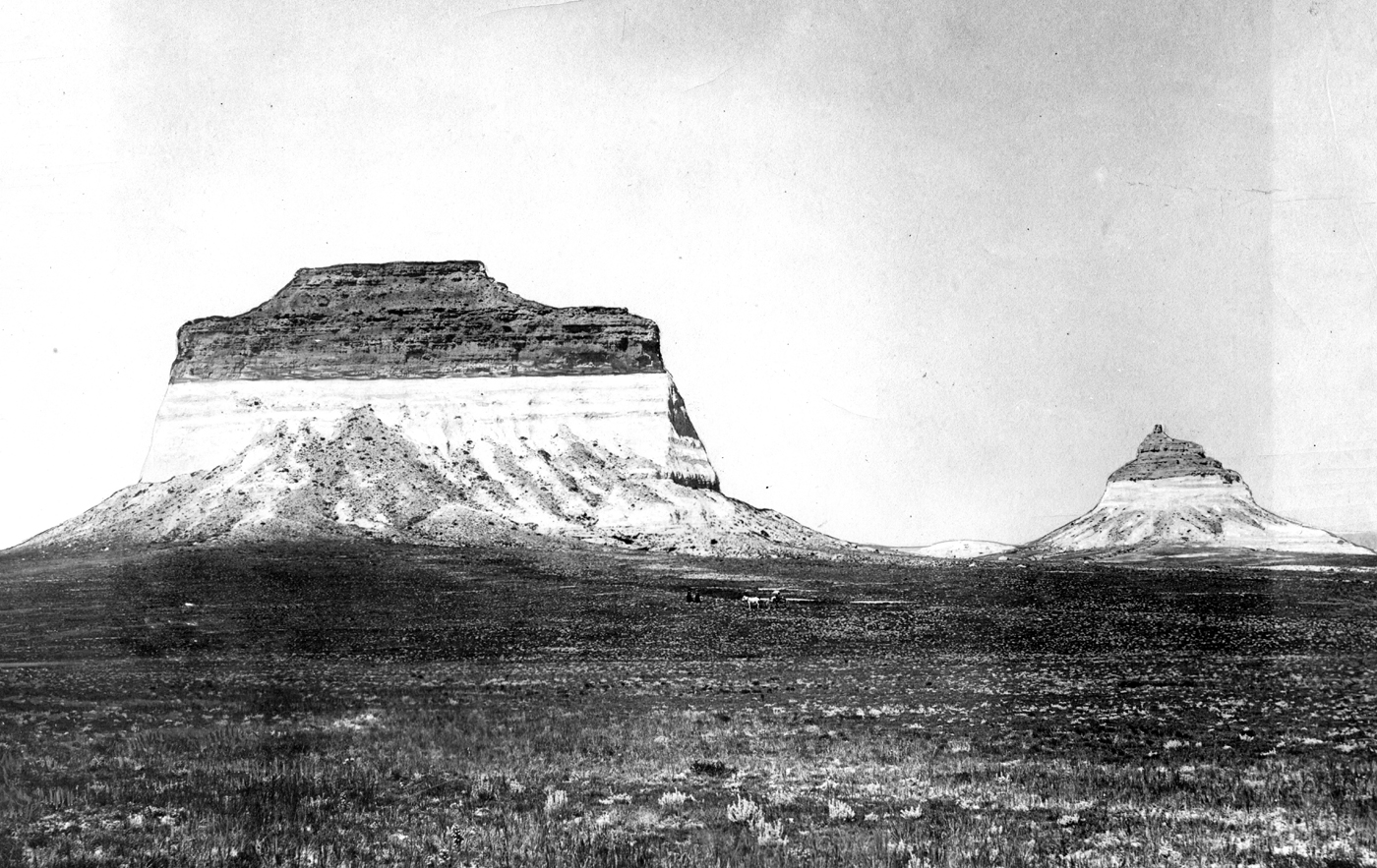
- Arikaree Formation over Brule Formation (Pawnee Buttes, Colorado)
- Type: Formation / Group
- Underlies: unconsolidated sediment
- Overlies: Chadron Formation or Brule Formation
- Thickness: up to 426.5 feet (130 m)

Lithology
- Primary: Siltstone, Sandstone
- Other: Carbonate rock

Location
- Region: central High Plains
- Country: United States

Type section
- Named for: Arikara Indians
- Named by: N. H. Darton

The Arikaree Formation, also Arikaree Group or Arikaree Sandstone is a geological unit in the central High Plains of the western United States. It preserves fossils dating to the late Oligocene to early Miocene.

== See also ==
- List of fossiliferous stratigraphic units in North Dakota
- Paleontology in North Dakota
