= Pseudolabis =

Pseudolabis Temporal range: Late Oligocene–Early Miocene

Scientific classification
- Kingdom: Animalia
- Phylum: Chordata
- Class: Mammalia
- Order: Artiodactyla
- Family: Camelidae
- Genus: †Pseudolabis; Matthew 1904

Species
- P. dakotensis

Extinct genus of mammals

Pseudolabis is an extinct genus of camelid endemic to North America. It lived from the Oligocene to the Miocene 30.8—20.4 mya, existing for approximately 11 million years. Fossils have been found on two sites in Wyoming and Nebraska.
