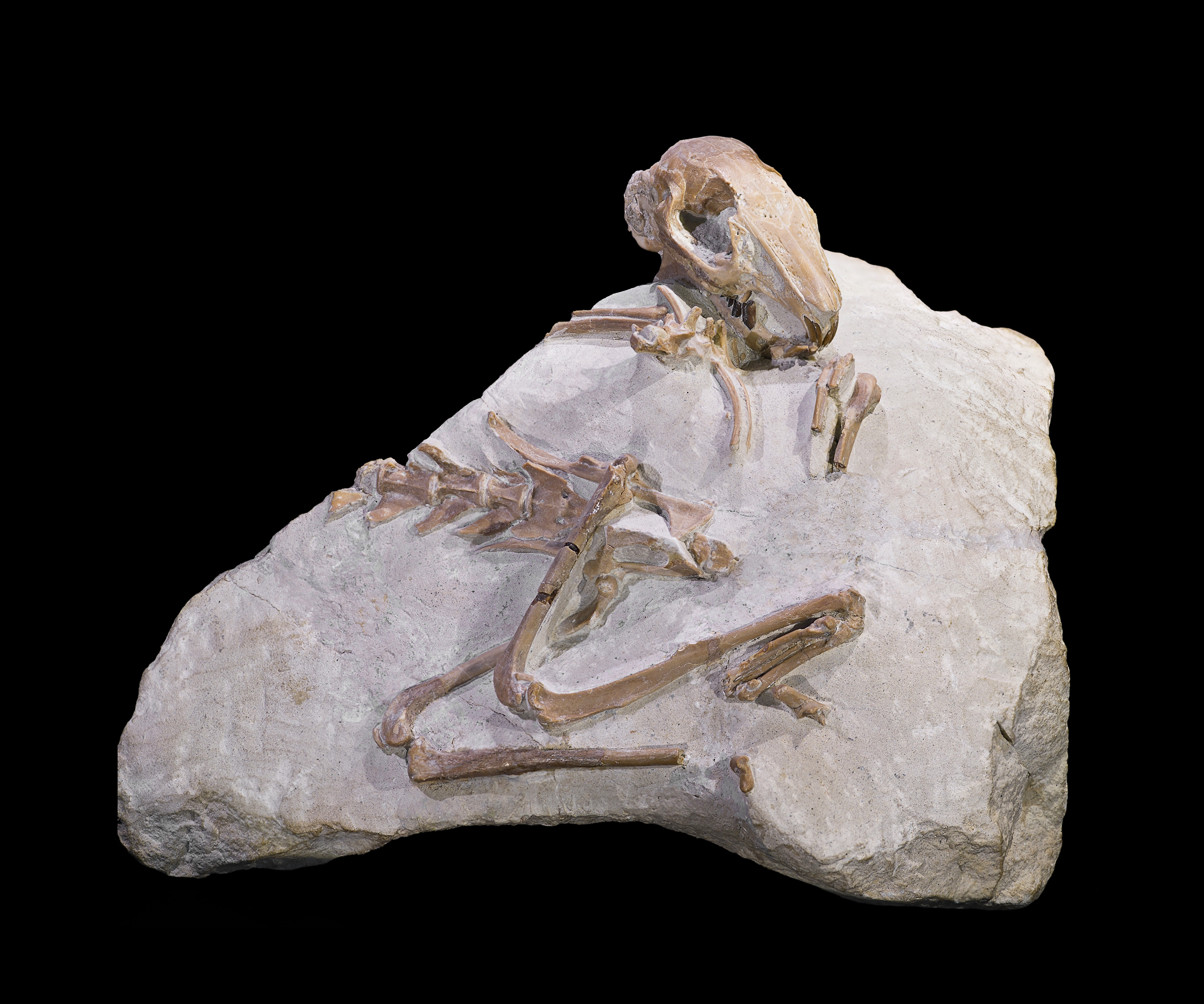
- Palaeolagus haydeni

Scientific classification
- Kingdom: Animalia
- Phylum: Chordata
- Class: Mammalia
- Order: Lagomorpha
- Genus: †Palaeolagus; Leidy, 1856

Species
- †P. burkei; †P. haydeni; †P. hemirhizis; †P. hypsodus; †P. intermedius; †P. philoi; †P. primus; †P. temnodon

= Palaeolagus =

Palaeolagus Temporal range: Late Eocene to Oligocene, 35–23 Ma

Extinct genus of lagomorph

Palaeolagus ('ancient hare') is an extinct genus of lagomorph. Palaeolagus lived during the Eocene and Oligocene epochs of North America.

== Taxonomy ==
The fossil remains of rabbits are scanty and those specimens that have been found are often too fragmentary to determine satisfactory the relationship with living forms. Most recent phylogenetic analyses have recovered it as a close relative of the last common ancestor of living Leporidae and Ochotonidae, as it displays a mosaic of characters typical of both groups. The bones of rabbits and hares are lightweight and fragile in structure, and so they are not easily preserved as fossils. Most of the species are inhabitants of uplands where conditions are not ideal for preservation. In a few deposits, rabbit remains seem numerous but many fossil species are known only from a few teeth and bones.

== Description ==
The 25 centimetres (9.8 in) long creature closely resembled modern rabbits. They were common herbivorous inhabitants of the savannas, plains, and woodlands of North America 30 million years ago.

Palaeolagus had rooted and hypsodont teeth. Compared to both present-day leporids and ochotonids, the maxillary cheek teeth of Palaeolagus possessed an expanded lagicone structure.

== Palaeoecology ==
Gross dental wear of Palaeolagus temnodon from the Horse Local Fauna of the Cypress Hills Formation of Saskatchewan shows that frugivory was its predominant dietary mode.

== Gallery ==
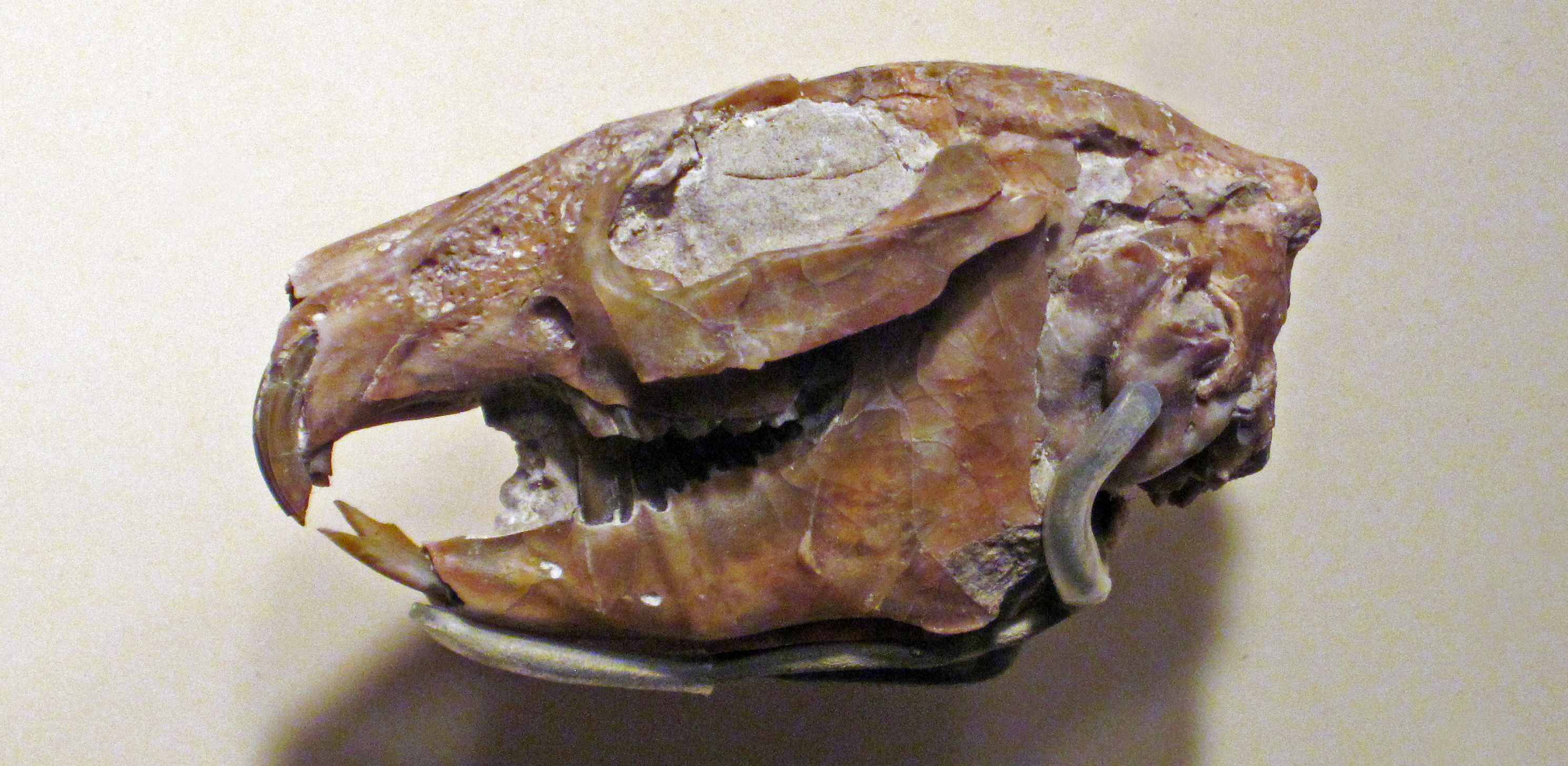
P. haydeni skull

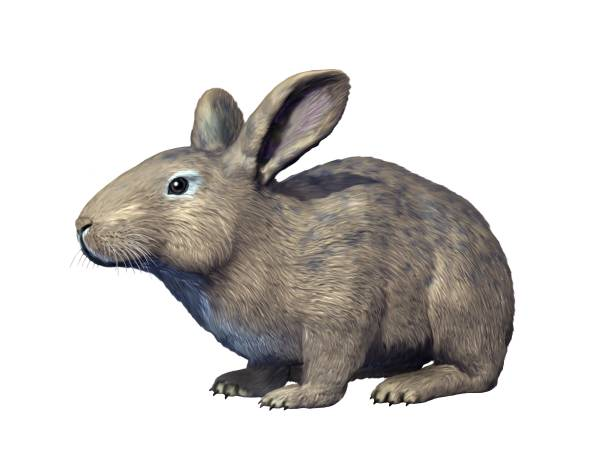
Restoration of P. haydeni
