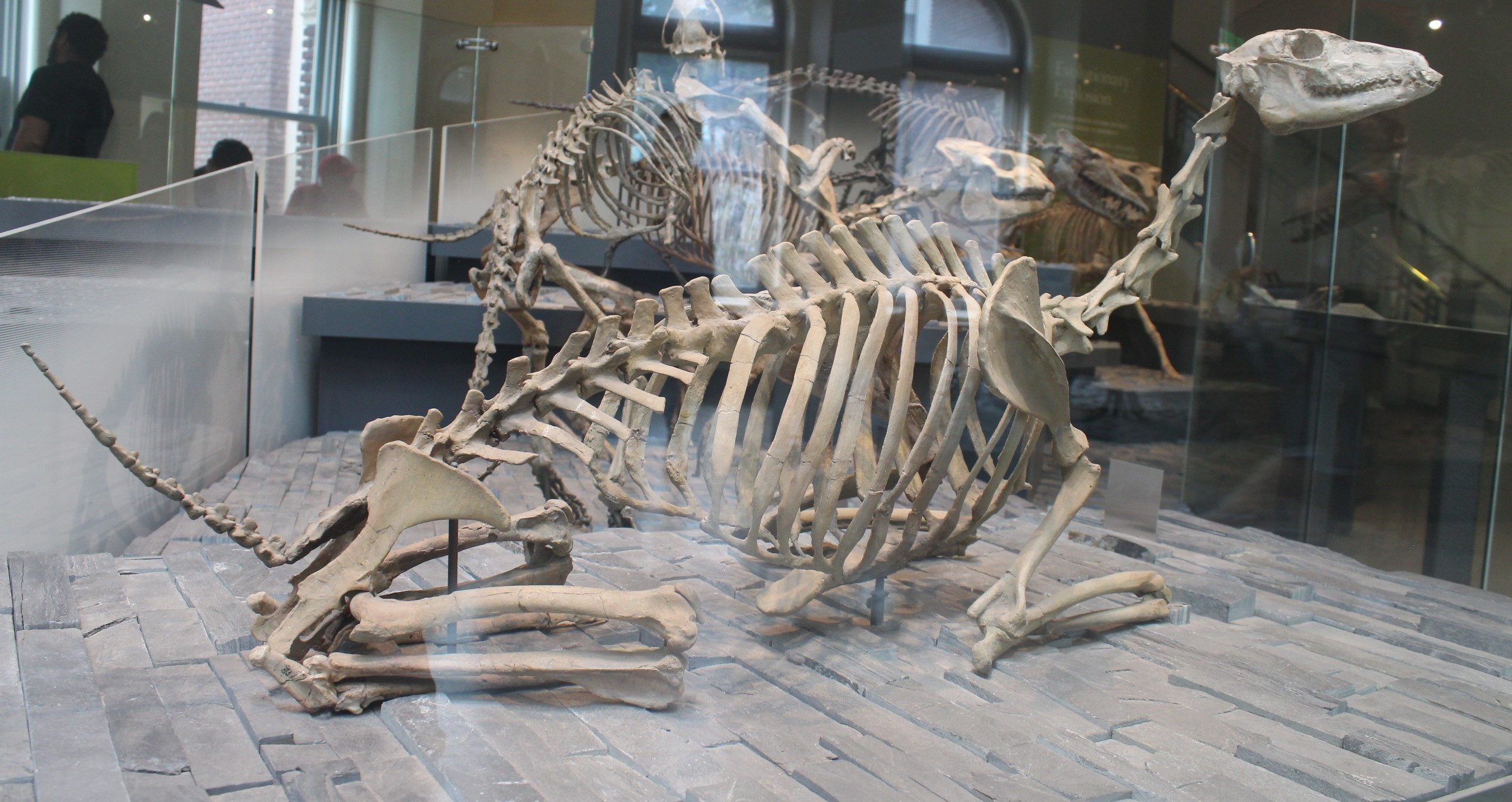
- Poebrotherium wilsoni skeletal mount

Scientific classification
- Kingdom: Animalia
- Phylum: Chordata
- Class: Mammalia
- Order: Artiodactyla
- Family: Camelidae
- Genus: †Poebrotherium; Leidy, 1847

Species
- †P. wilsoni Leidy, 1847(type); †P. chadronensis; †P. eximium

= Poebrotherium =

Poebrotherium Temporal range: Middle Eocene to Middle Miocene, 46.3–13.6 Ma

Extinct genus of mammals

Poebrotherium (/ˌpoʊbroʊˈθɪəriəm/ POH-broh-THEER-ee-əm) is an extinct genus of camelid, endemic to North America. They lived from the Eocene to Miocene epochs, 46.3—13.6 mya, existing for approximately 32 million years.

== Discovery and history ==
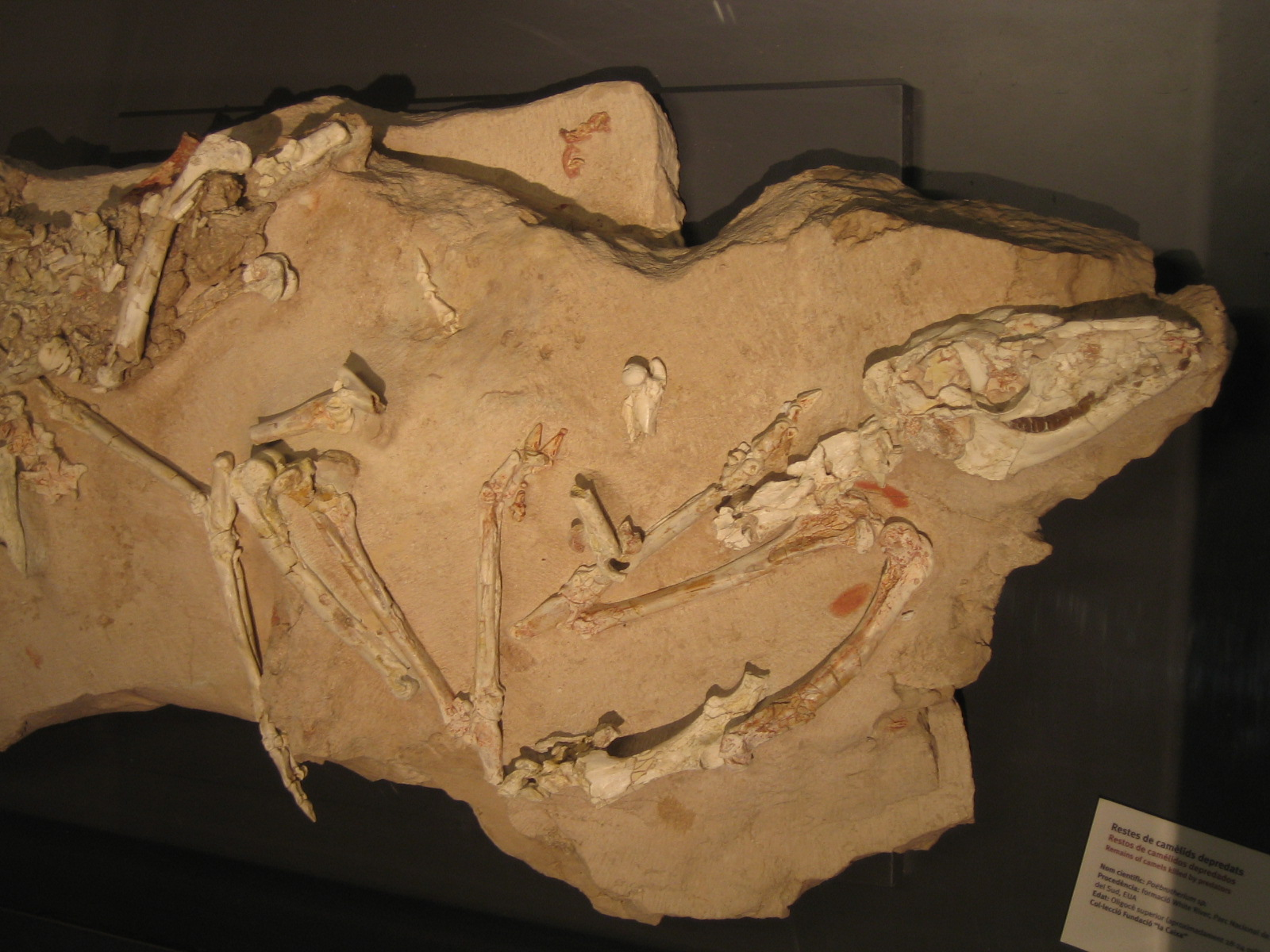
Fossil of Poebrotherium sp. in CosmoCaixa Barcelona

Poebrotherium was first named by scientist Joseph Leidy in 1848, and its relationship to other White River fossils was later expanded by him in 1853. Fur trapper Samuel Culbertson was working in Nebraska in pursuit of fur bearing mammals, and found a collection of strange fossil animal bones. He sent a box of these bones to his family back east, and not knowing what to make of them, they forwarded the remains to Leidy for identification. Several animals' remains were included in this package, but one of the most interesting was that of a small mammal, about the size of a small deer or sheep. In addition to a partial skull, a portion of a forelimb was found. The portions that Leidy was able to examine helped him determine it was likely related to modern llamas, even though there was a paucity of new material available after his 1848 diagnosis. This package spawned Leidy's interest in the White River badlands and its fauna, and he eventually sent collectors from the American Museum west to expand his collection. Between 1848 and 1853, cases of new material were shipping back to Leidy. Maddeningly, only three more Poebrotherium tooth samples were among the remains recovered.

== Etymology ==
The term poebrotherium comes from Ancient Greek: ποιηβόρος (poiēbóros, "grass-eating") and θηρίον (thēríon, "wild animal; animal; "beast"), in Latinised form. The specific epithet is the Latinised name of a person or place, or a Latin adjective denoting a postulated characteristic of the species.

== Species ==
- Poebrotherium wilsoni can be translated as "Wilson's grass-eating beast".
- Poebrotherium chadronensis can be translated as "grass-eating beast from Chadron [formation]".
- Poebrotherium eximium can be translated as "Extraordinary grass-eating beast"

== Description ==
Poebrotherium looked more like modern camels than its predecessor Protylopus, but at 90 centimetres (3.0 ft) in height, it was roughly the size of a modern sheep. Its skull resembled that of a modern llama, while its limbs ended in hooved toes and were more built for speed than the feet of Protylopus. Despite this apparent adaptation to the open plains, Poebrotherium has been found in all major White River environments, including forests and river overbank deposits, indicating that it was not tied to one particular environment. The teeth of Poebrotherium were more generalised than those of modern camelids. In fact, despite the name meaning "grass-eating beast" it is likely that Poebrotherium was either a browser or a mixed-feeder, and grass may have played a minimal role in the diet of Poebrotherium.

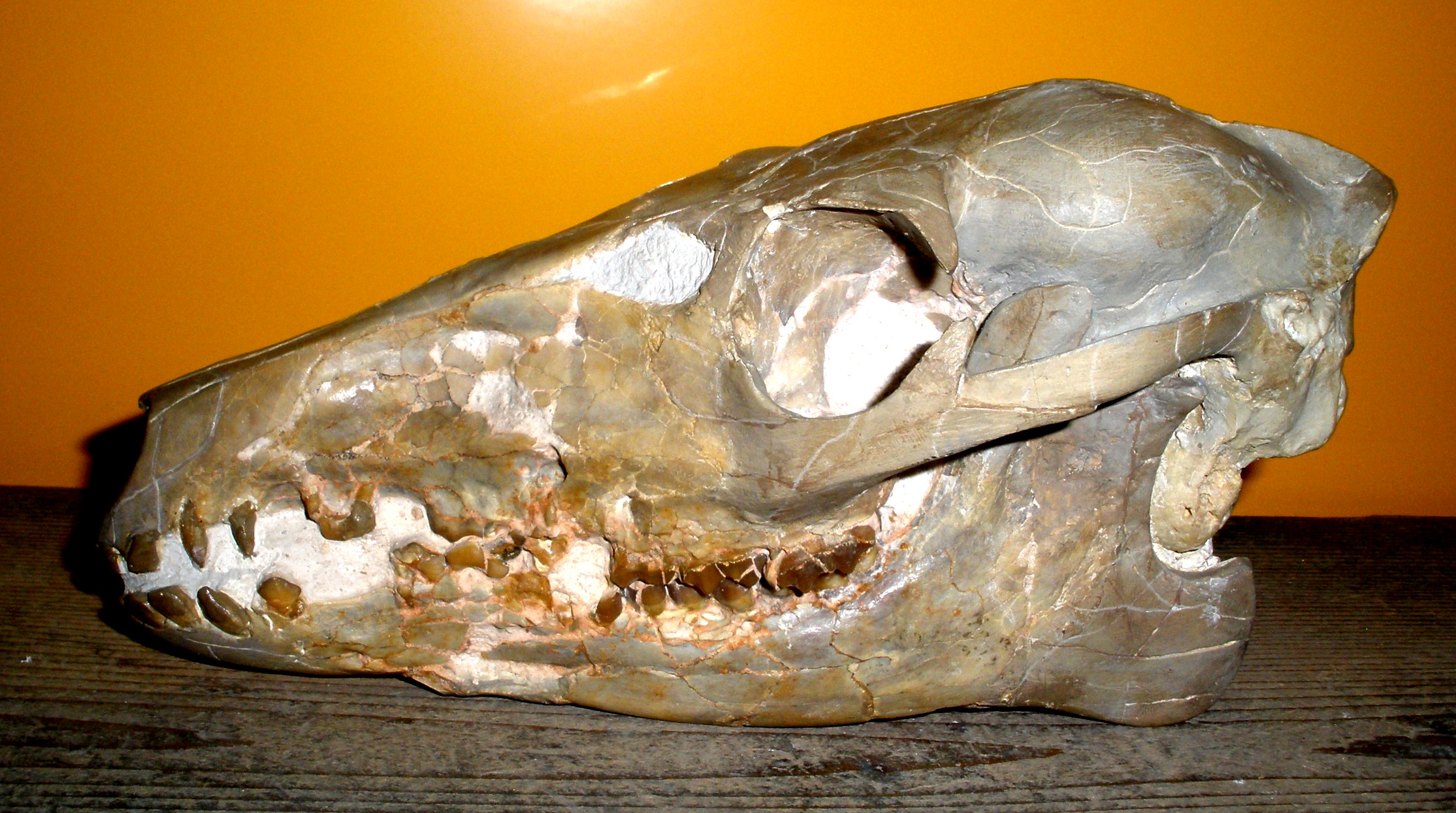
Poebrotherium wilsoni skull in the Milan Natural History Museum

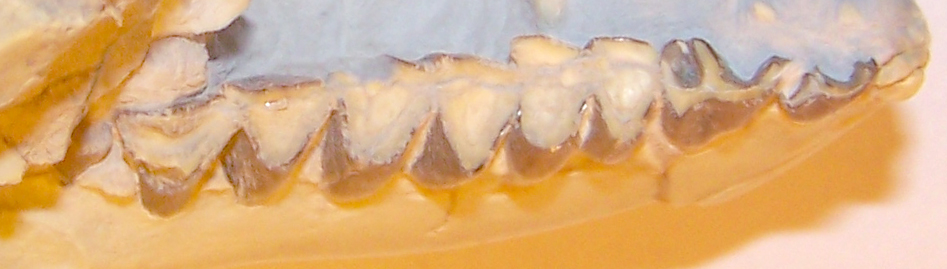
Right dentary dentition of a juvenile P. wilsoni from the White River Badlands.

Unlike its modern cousins, which are either adapted for desert or alpine conditions, Poebrotherium took the place of a gazelle or deer in the White River Fauna ecosystem. This trait was taken to an extreme in later camels, notably Stenomylus. Fossil evidence has shown that Poebrotherium was a popular prey item for the entelodont Archaeotherium. Remains of partial Poebrotherium carcasses have been found fossilized, and appear to have been killed and cached by Archaeotherium, the only animal known from the White River ecosystem that could have made the feeding marks found on the bones of Poebrotherium.

== Relationships ==
Poebrotherium lies within the clade Camelidae, which can be defined as (Stenomylinae + (Miolabinae + (Protolabinae + Camelinae))) + Poebrotherium. As such, Poebrotherium lies outside the Camelinae proper. In fact the definition of Camelidae is the most recent common ancestor of Poebrotherium and Camelus, and all of its descendants.

Several authors offer characteristics to define Poebrotherium. These include a long neck; an adult height of around 100 centimetres (3.3 ft); relatively unspecialized teeth; moderately long legs; long, unsplayed, unfused, and proximally wider-than-deep metapodials; a pes lacking digits 1, 4, and 5; and a typical ungulate stance but lacking in a foot pad.
