= Chadron Formation =

Rock formation in North Dakota, South Dakota, Nebraska, and Wyoming

- Stratigraphic range: Late Eocene; ~37–34 Ma
- Type: Geological formation
- Unit of: White River Formation
- Underlies: Brule Formation
- Overlies: Fox Hills Formation, Yellow Mounds Paleosol, Pierre Shale

Lithology
- Primary: Fine grained clastic rocks
- Other: Tuff, Sandstone

Location
- Region: Nebraska, Wyoming, North Dakota, South Dakota
- Country: United States

Type section
- Named for: Chadron, Nebraska

Chadron Formation is a geological formation in North Dakota, South Dakota, northwestern Nebraska, and eastern Wyoming. It is named after the town of Chadron, Nebraska. It was mapped out by Carl Vondra in the 1950s.

== See also ==
- White River Formation
- White River Fauna
- Chadronian
