= White River Formation =

Geologic formation in the United States

- Stratigraphic range: Late Eocene-Early Oligocene (Chadronian-Whitneyan); ~37.2–30.8 Ma
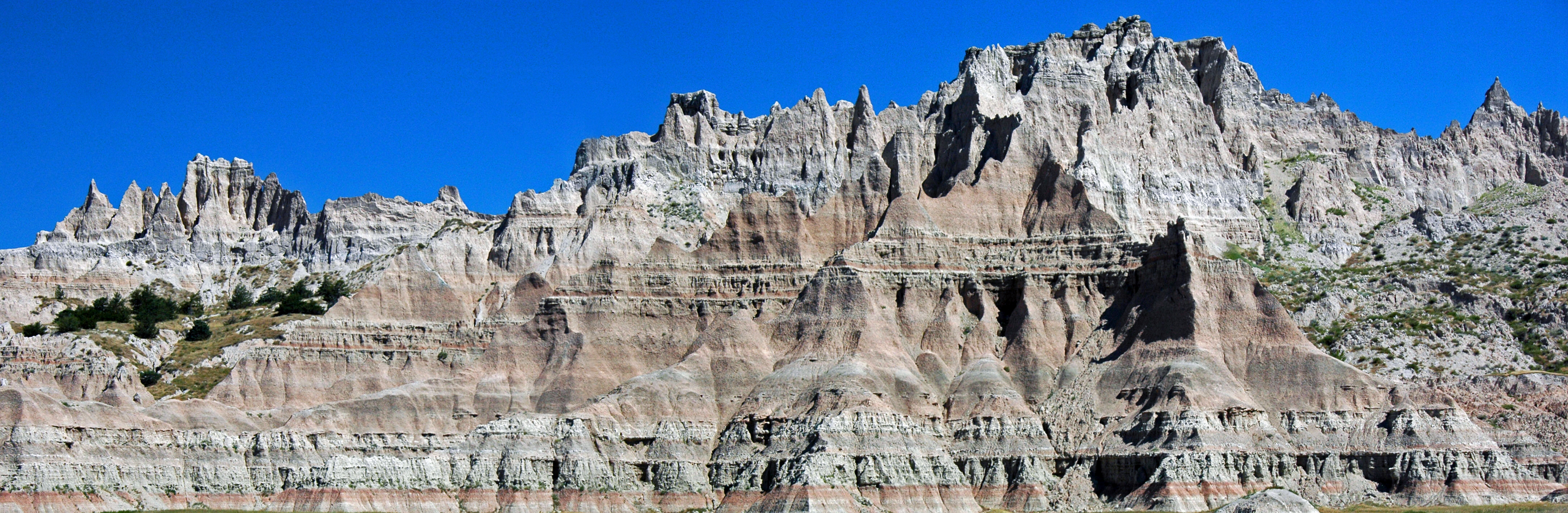
- White River Badlands in South Dakota
- Type: Formation
- Sub-units: Brule Formation, Chadron Formation
- Overlies: Pierre Shale
- Thickness: 230–300 m (750–980 ft)

Lithology
- Primary: Tuffaceous claystone, conglomerate

Location
- Coordinates: 43.2°N 107.1°W
- Approximate paleocoordinates: 44.8°N 98.4°W
- Region: Colorado, Nebraska, South Dakota, Wyoming
- Country: United States
- Extent: northern Great Plains and central Rocky Mountains

Type section
- Named for: White River (Missouri River tributary)
- White River Formation (the United States) White River Formation (Wyoming)

The White River Formation is a geologic formation of the Paleogene Period, in the northern Great Plains and central Rocky Mountains, within the United States.

It has been found in northeastern Colorado, Dawes County in western Nebraska, Badlands of western South Dakota, and Douglas area of southeastern Wyoming.

== Fossil record ==
The geologic formation preserves fossils dating back to the Eocene and Oligocene Epochs of the Paleogene Period, during the Cenozoic Era. It contains the most complete Late Eocene−Priabonian and Early Oligocene−Rupelian vertebrate record in North America.

== See also ==
- White River Formation prehistoric fauna
- Chadronian — Priabonian, Rupelian
- Orellan — Rupelian
