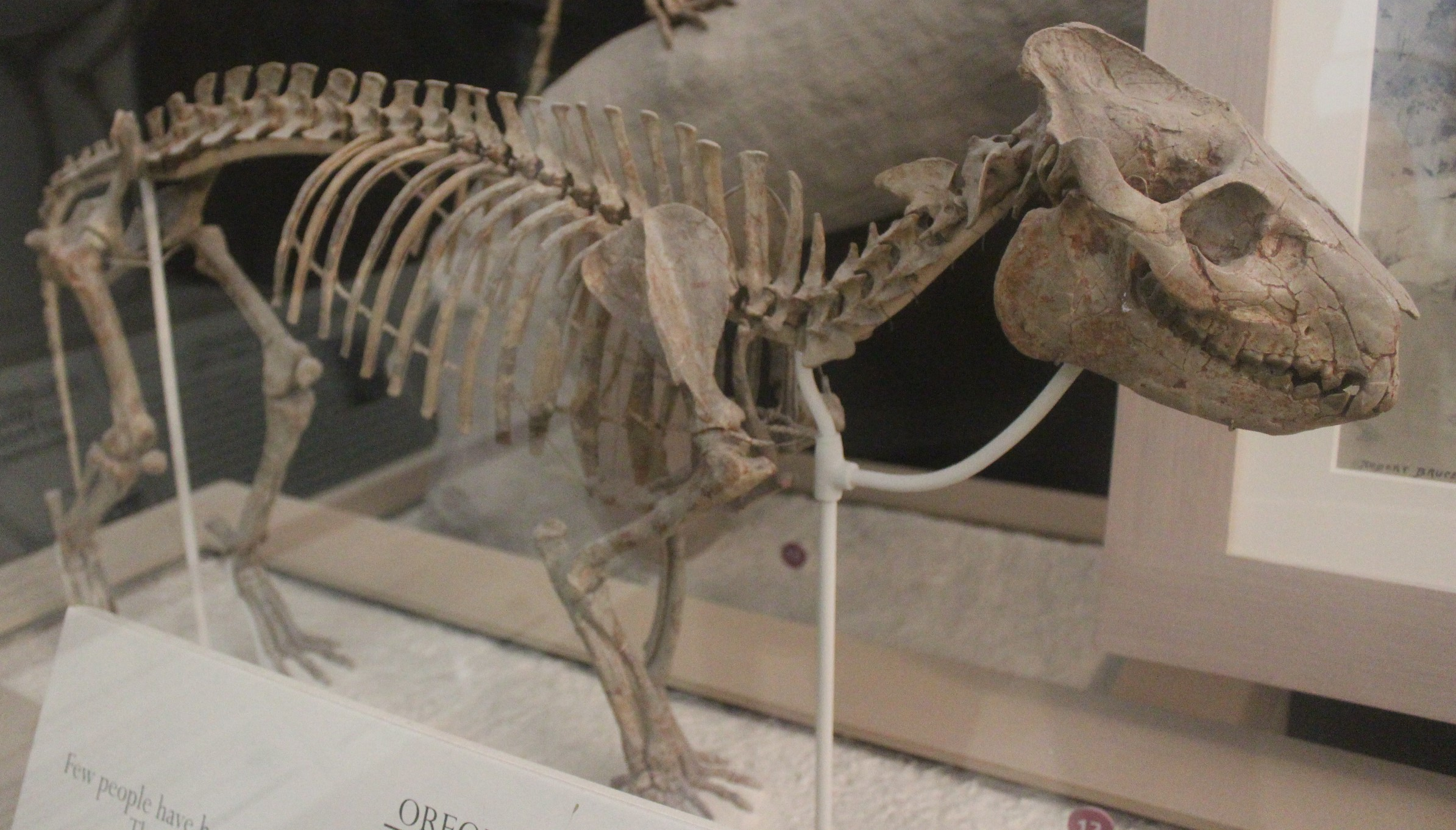
- M. culbertsoni skeleton, American Museum of Natural History

Scientific classification
- Kingdom: Animalia
- Phylum: Chordata
- Class: Mammalia
- Order: Artiodactyla
- Family: †Merycoidodontidae
- Subfamily: †Merycoidodontinae
- Genus: †Merycoidodon; Leidy, 1848

Type species
- †Oreodon culbertsoni (Leidy, 1848)

Subgenera and species
- †Merycoidodon: †M. (?M.) presidioensis; †M. (M.) culbertsoni; †Otarohyus: †M. (O.) bullatus; †M. (O.) major; unassigned: †M. dunagani

Synonyms
- †Blickohyus Schultz and Falkenbach, 1968; †Genetochoerus Schultz and Falkenbach, 1968; †Oreodon Leidy, 1851; †Otionohyus Schultz and Falkenbach, 1968; †Paramerycoidodon Schultz and Falkenbach, 1968; †Prodesmatochoerus Schultz and Falkenbach, 1954; †Subdesmatochoerus Schultz and Falkenbach, 1954

= Merycoidodon =

Merycoidodon Temporal range: Middle Eocene–Middle Miocene

Extinct genus of mammals

Merycoidodon ("ruminating teeth") is an extinct genus of herbivorous artiodactyl of the family Merycoidodontidae, more popularly known by the name Oreodon ("hillock teeth"). It was endemic to North America during the Middle Eocene to Middle Miocene (46—16 mya) existing for approximately 30 million years.

== Taxonomy ==
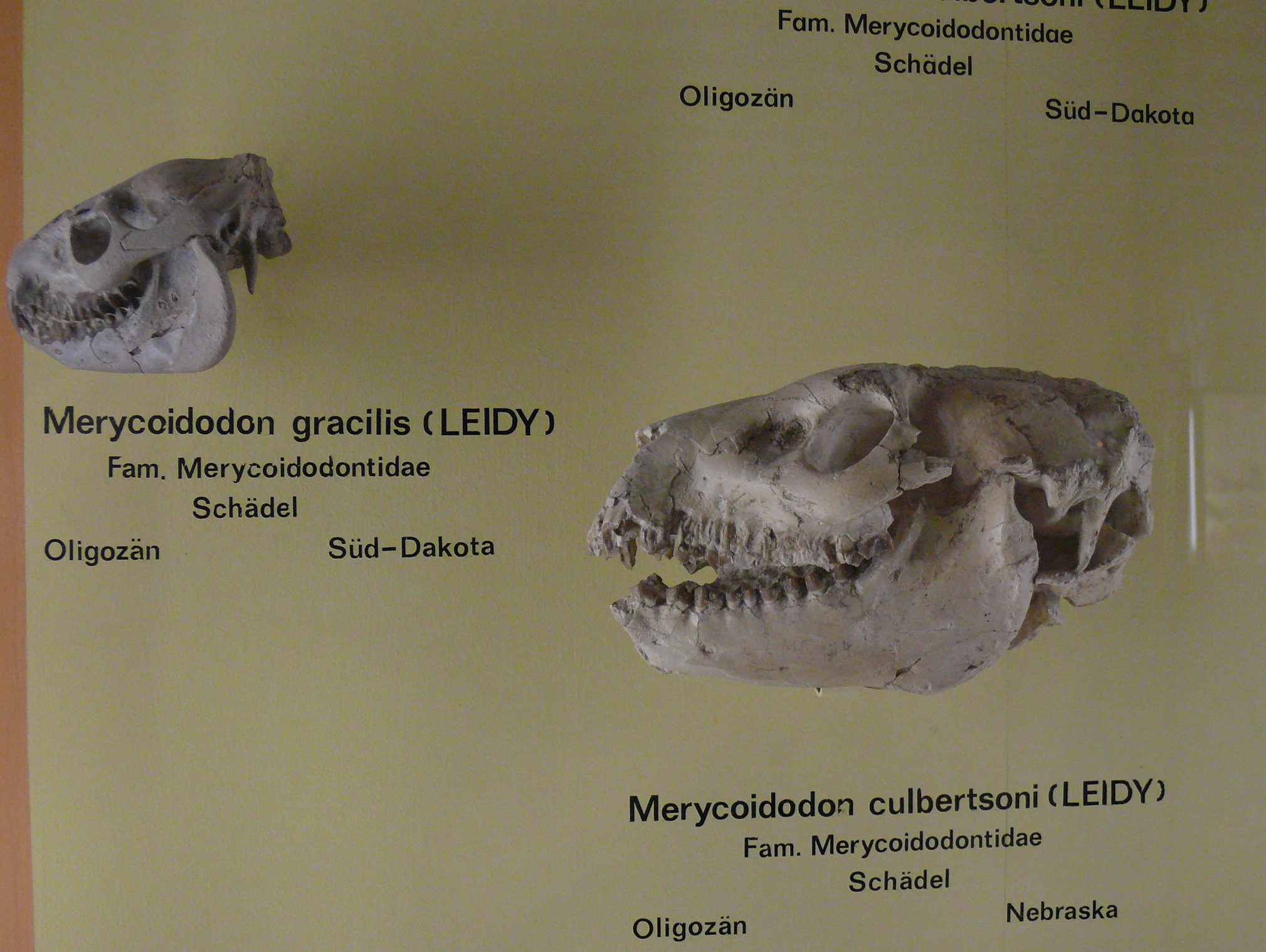
Skull of Merycoidodon culbertsoni

Most researchers in paleobiology and paleontology now use the antecedent genus Merycoidodon to refer to this Oligocene epoch oreodont, even though it was once widely known by the younger synonym of Oreodon. Taxonomically speaking, Merycoidodon belongs to the family Merycoidodontidae (once known as "Oreodontidae"), a group of artiodactyls related to camels that were endemic to North America. Its ancestors date back to the Eocene and its last descendants are known from the end of the Miocene, so that oreodonts, broadly speaking, lived throughout most of the Paleogene.

== Morphology ==
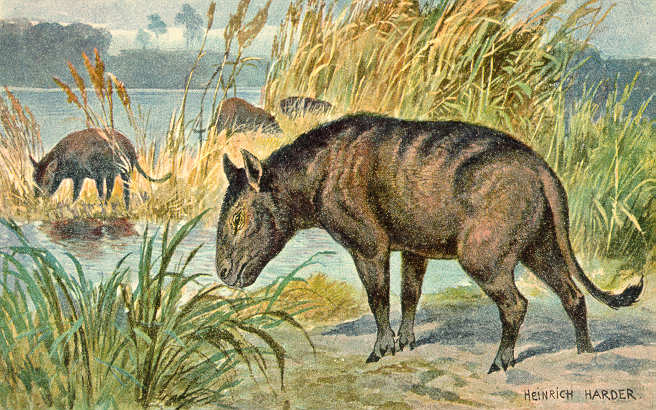
Painting from around 1920

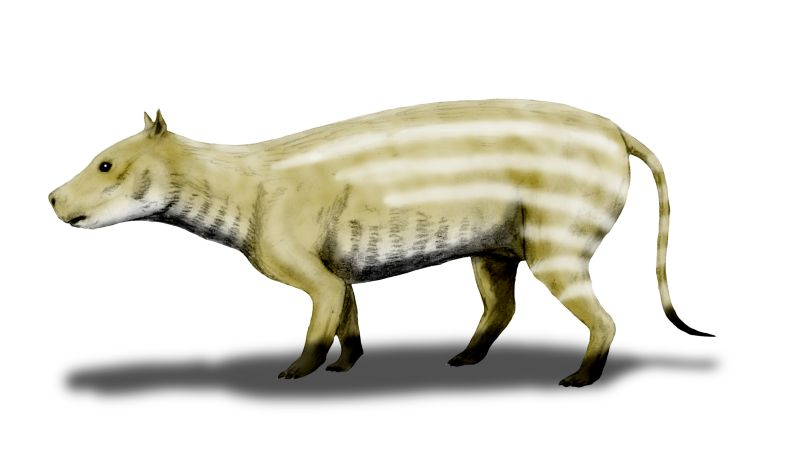
Modern restoration of Merycoidodon culbertsoni

Merycoidodon would have somewhat resembled a pig in appearance, but had a longer body, at about 1.4 metres (4.6 ft), and short limbs. The fore limbs had five toes (although the first one was vestigial), while the hind limbs had four. Given the shape of the limbs, it is unlikely that the animals would have been able to run fast. Unlike modern ruminants, they had a full set of teeth, although the molars were adapted for grinding up tough vegetation. Notably, they had strong, and very striking, canines.

The skulls of Merycoidodon have a pit in front of the eyes. Similar pits are found in the skulls of modern deer, where they contain a scent gland used for marking territory. Although Merycoidodon was not directly related to deer, it seems likely that it possessed a similar gland, which may imply that it, too, was territorial. Oreodonts lived in large herds and moved about from place to place. They seem to have had a predilection for well-watered regions, where food was plentiful and succulent. The number of fossils found implies that, at one time, oreodonts were as plentiful in South Dakota as zebras are today on the Serengeti plains, and as common in Denver, Colorado as cattle on the Colorado farm range.

== Fossil distribution ==
Fossils have been uncovered from as far north as Alberta, Canada to Florida, Texas, Colorado, and Oregon in the United States.

== Gallery ==
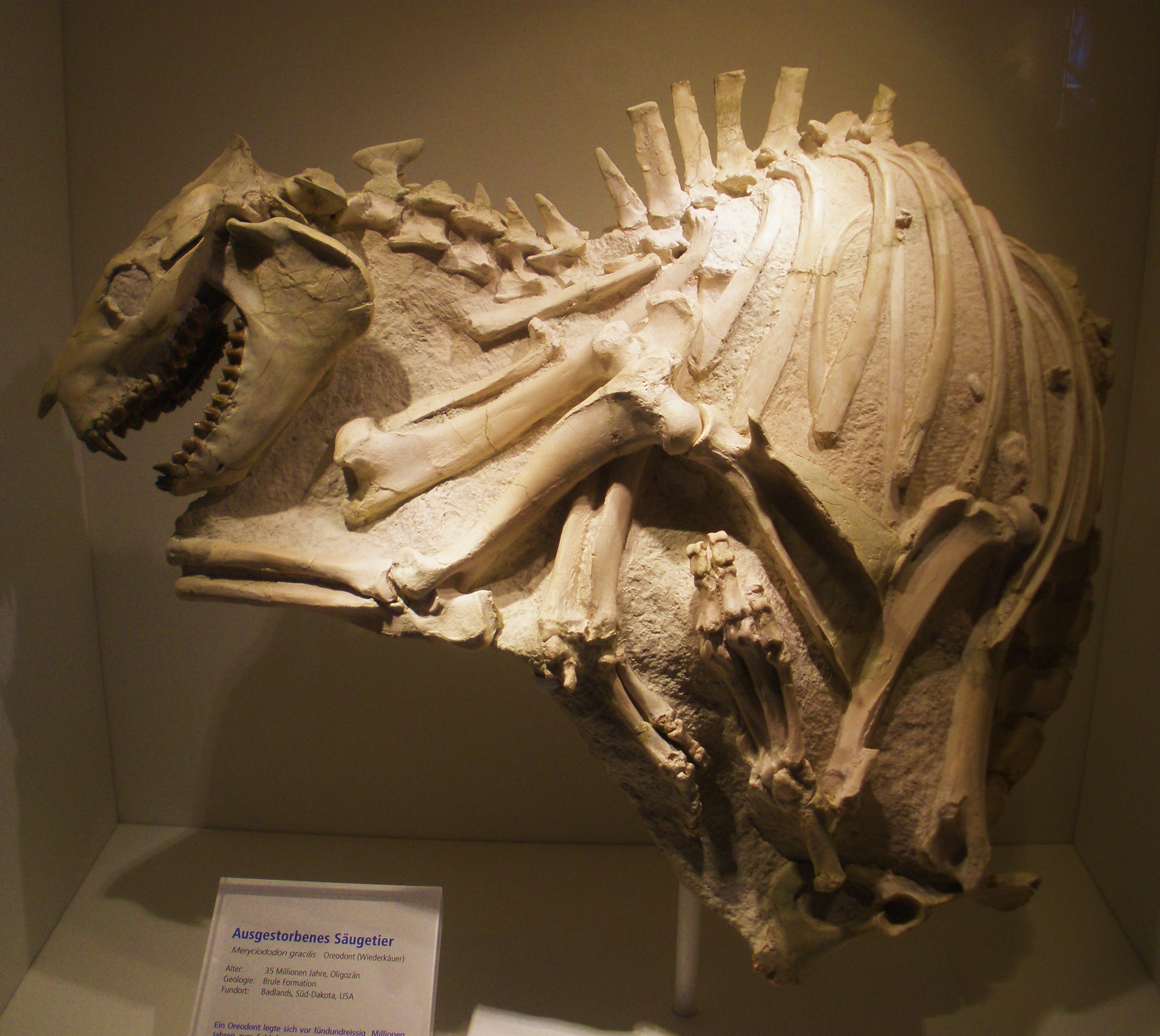
Merycoidodon gracilis from South Dakota

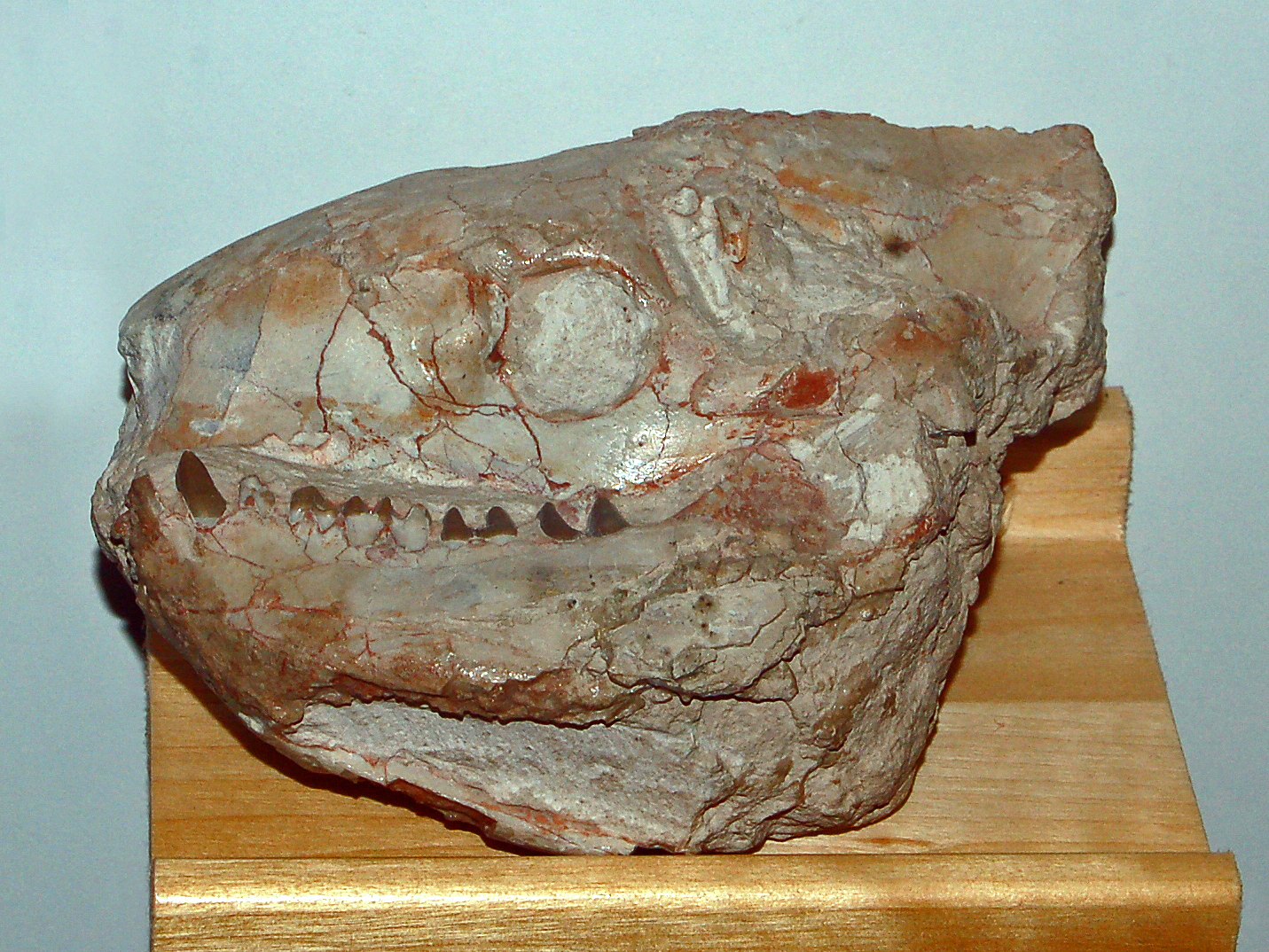
Merycoidodon gracilis from South Dakota. Skull

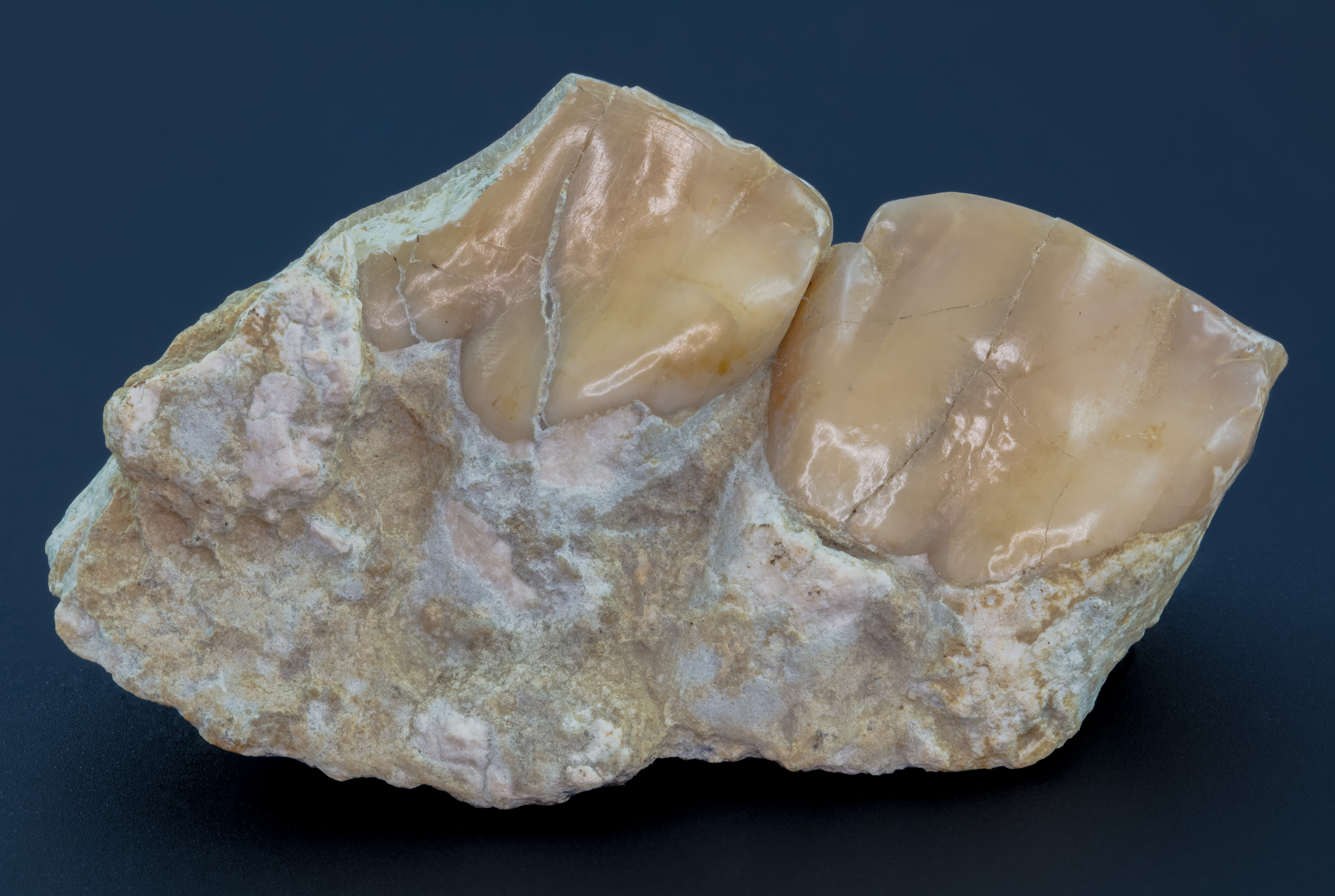
3 cm-long teeth on a jaw fragment from Merycoidodon culbertsoni. Oligocene, Brule Formation, South Dakota, USA

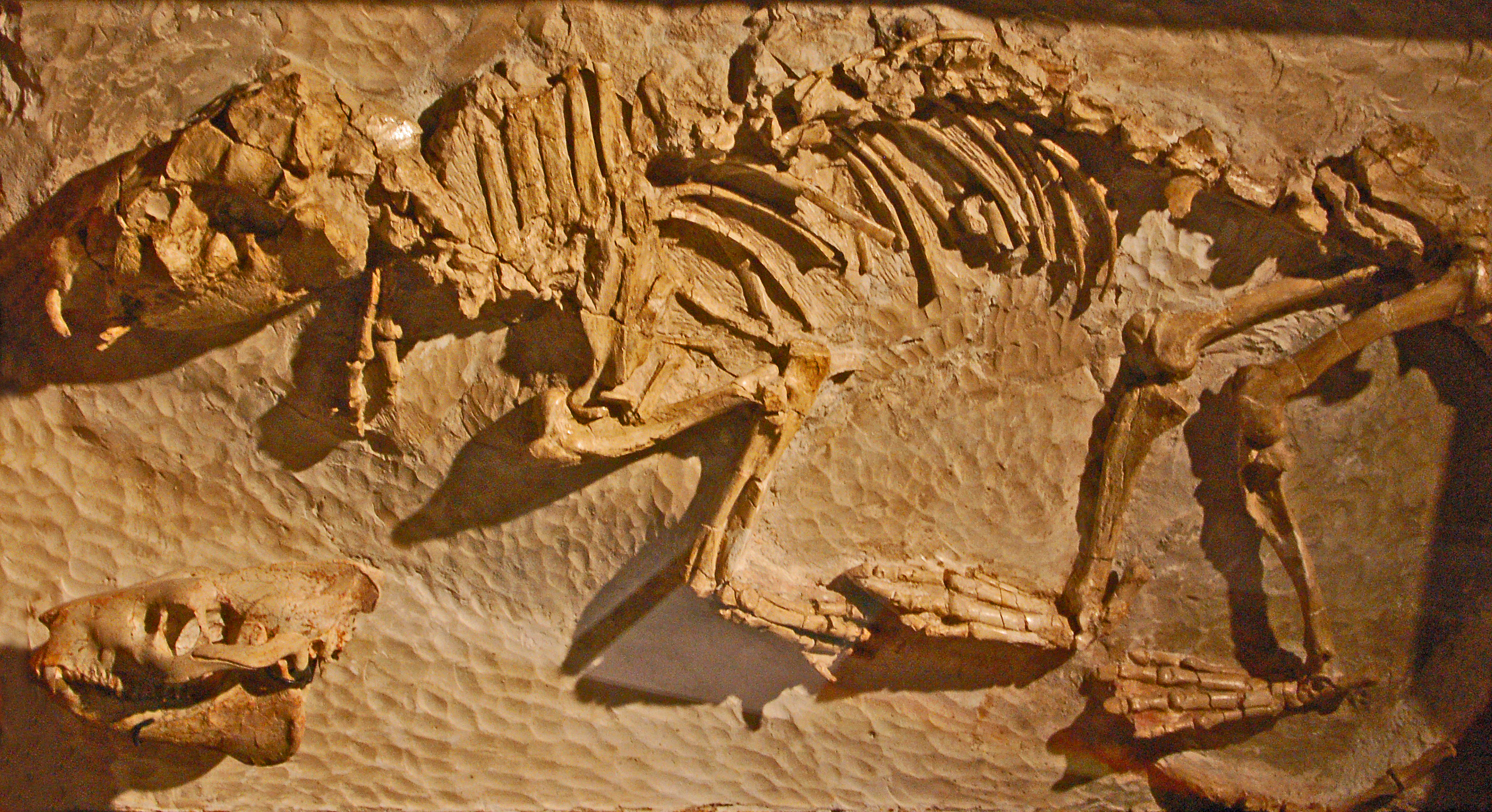
Skeleton at the Canadian Museum of Nature
