= Monroe Creek Formation =

Geologic formation with Paleogene fossils in South Dakota

- Stratigraphic range: Paleogene
- Type: Geological formation

Location
- Region: South Dakota
- Country: United States

The Monroe Creek Formation is a geologic formation in South Dakota. It preserves fossils dating back to the Paleogene period.

== Fossil content ==
Color key: Taxon / Reclassified taxon / Taxon falsely reported as present / Dubious taxon or junior synonym / Ichnotaxon / Ootaxon / Morphotaxon	Notes; Uncertain or tentative taxa are in small text; ~~crossed out~~ taxa are discredited.

=== Mammals ===
==== Carnivorans ====
Carnivorans reported from the Monroe Creek Formation
Genus	Species	Presence	Material	Notes	Images
Enhydrocyon	E. crassidens	Shannon County, South Dakota.	Crushed skull (AMNH 12886) & other skull elements.	A hesperocyonine dog.	
Enhydrocyon	E. pahinsintewakpa		Multiple specimens.	A hesperocyonine dog.	
Leptocyon	L. delicatus	Porcupine Creek, South Dakota.	Left partial ramus (ACM 31102).	A canine dog, may instead be from the Harrison Formation.	
Mammacyon	M. obtusidens	Wounded Knee Area.	Skull & partial skeleton (ACM 34-41).	A bear-dog.	
Neocynodesmus	N. delicatus	Porcupine Creek, Wounded Knee Area.	Left mandible (ACM 31102).	Junior synonym of Leptocyon.	
Nimravus	N. sectator	Wounded Knee Area.	Left ramus (AMNH 12882).	Possibly instead from the Harrison Formation.	
Nothocyon	N. geismarianus	Wounded Knee Area.	Fragmentary ramus (AMNH 12872).	An arctoid formerly thought to be a canid.	
Nothocyon	N. near latidens	Wounded Knee Area.	Jaw fragment (AMNH 12873).	Reassigned to Phlaocyon.	
Promartes	P. gemmarosae	Wounded Knee Area.	Nearly-complete skeleton (ACM 31-33).	A mustelid.	

==== Eulipotyphlans ====
Eulipotyphlans reported from the Monroe Creek Formation
Genus	Species	Presence	Material	Notes	Images
Proscalops	P. sp. indeterminate	Wounded Knee Area.	Isolated molar (SDSM 5899).	A proscalopid.	

==== Rodents ====
Rodents reported from the Monroe Creek Formation
Genus	Species	Presence	Material	Notes	Images
Allomys	A. harkseni	Wounded Knee Area.	Molars.	An aplodontid.	
Capatanka	C. brachyceps	Wounded Knee Area.	Skull (AMNH 12902).	A castorid, possibly instead from the Harrison Formation.	
Meniscomys	M. sp. indeterminate	Wounded Knee Area.	Isolated tooth (SDSM 59157).	An aplodontid.	
Palaeocastor	P. simplicidens	Wounded Knee Area.	Partial cranium (AMNH 12900).	A castorid.	
Pleurolicus	P. dakotensis	Wounded Knee Area.	Left ramus (AMNH 12893).	A gopher.	
Promylagaulus	P. cf. riggsi	Wounded Knee Area.	Isolated molar.	A mylagaulid.	

==== Ungulates ====
Ungulates reported from the Monroe Creek Formation
Genus	Species	Presence	Material	Notes	Images
Nanotragulus	N. ordinatus	Wounded Knee Area.	Mandibles.	May instead be from the Harrison Formation.	
Parahippus	P. pristinus	Wounded Knee Area.	Hind feet (AMNH 12922).	May instead be from the Harrison Formation.	

=== Reptiles ===
==== Squamates ====
Squamates reported from the Monroe Creek Formation
Genus	Species	Presence	Material	Notes	Images
Peltosaurus	P. granulosus	Sharps Corner, South Dakota.	Multiple specimens.	A glyptosaurine also known from the Sharps Formation.	

== See also ==
- List of fossiliferous stratigraphic units in South Dakota
- Paleontology in South Dakota
