= Sharps Formation =

- Stratigraphic range: Paleogene
- Type: Geological formation
- Sub-units: Rockyford Member
- Underlies: Monroe Creek Formation
- Overlies: Brule Formation

Location
- Region: South Dakota
- Country: United States

The Sharps Formation is a geologic formation in South Dakota. It preserves fossils dating back to the Paleogene.

The Sharps Formation is the namesake of the community of Sharps Corner, South Dakota.

== Fossil content ==
Color key: Taxon / Reclassified taxon / Taxon falsely reported as present / Dubious taxon or junior synonym / Ichnotaxon / Ootaxon / Morphotaxon	Notes; Uncertain or tentative taxa are in small text; ~~crossed out~~ taxa are discredited.

=== Mammals ===
==== Carnivorans ====
Carnivorans reported from the Sharps Formation
Genus	Species	Location	Stratigraphic position	Material	Notes	Images
Archaeocyon	A. leptodus	Shannon & Jackson counties, South Dakota.	Middle & upper part of the formation.	Skull elements.	A borophagine dog.	
Archaeocyon	A. pavidus	Southeast corner of Sheep Mountain, Shannon County, South Dakota.	Lower part of the formation.	2 partial skeletons.	A borophagine dog.	
Cormocyon	C. haydeni	Wounded Knee area, Shannon County, South Dakota.	Upper part of the formation.	Left maxillary (F:AM 49436).	A borophagine dog.	
Cynarctoides	C. lemur	Shannon County, South Dakota.	Lower & upper parts of the formation.	Jaw elements.	A borophagine dog also known from the John Day, Brule & Browns Park formations.	
Cynarctoides	C. roii	Wounded Knee Area, Shannon County, South Dakota.	Upper part of the formation.	Skull elements.	A borophagine dog also known from the lower Arikaree Group	
Cynodesmus	C. cooki	Wounded Knee Area.		Mandibles.	Reassigned to the genus Otarocyon.	
Ekgmoiteptecela	E. olsontau	Wounded Knee Area.	Rockyford Member.	Right ramus (SDSM 54247).	Junior synonym of Hoplophoneus cerebralis.	
Enhydrocyon	E. crassidens	Wounded Knee Area.		Crania.	A hesperocyonine dog also known from the Harrison Formation.	
Enhydrocyon	E. pahinsintewakpa	Wounded Knee Area.	Near the top of the formation.	Right mandible.	A hesperocyonine dog.	
Hesperocyon	H. leptodus	Wounded Knee Area.		Skull elements.	Reassigned to the genus Archaeocyon.	
Hoplophoneus	H. cerebralis	Wounded Knee Area, South Dakota.	Rockyford Member.	Right ramus (SDSM 54247).	A nimravid.	
Leptocyon	L. douglassi	Wounded Knee Area.		Maxillary fragments.	A canine dog also known from the Toston & John Day formations.	
Mesocyon	M. robustus	Wounded Knee Area.		Mandibles.	A hesperocyonine dog.	
Mesocyon	"M." temnodon	Shannon County, South Dakota.	Basal part and near the top of the formation.	Rami.	A hesperocyonine dog.	
Nothocyon	N. geismarianus	Wounded Knee Area.		Jaw elements.	An arctoid formerly thought to be a canid, also known from the Monroe Creek Formation.	
Nothocyon	N. lemur	Wounded Knee Area.		Jaw elements.	Reassigned to Cynarctoides.	
Nothocyon	N. roii	Wounded Knee Area.		Skull elements.	Reassigned to Cynarctoides.	
Otarocyon	O. cooki	Wounded Knee Area, Shannon County, South Dakota.	Upper part of the formation.	Partial rami.	A small borophagine dog also known from the lower Arikaree Group.	
Palaeogale	P. dorothiae	Wounded Knee Area.		Fragment of right mandible (SDSM 53326).	A palaeogalid.	
Paradaphoenus	P. tooheyi	South Dakota.		Maxilla (LACM 21649).	A bear-dog.	
Philotrox	P. condoni	Wounded Knee area, Shannon County & Quiver Hill localities, Washabaugh County.	Middle member.	Skull and jaw remains.	A hesperocyonine dog also found in the John Day Formation.	
Sunkahetanka	S. geringensis	Wounded Knee Area, Shannon & Jackson counties.	Middle member.	Jaw elements.	A hesperocyonine dog also known from the topmost part of the Brule Formation.	
Sunkahetanka	S. pahinsintewakpa	Wounded Knee Area.		Right mandible.	Reassigned to Enhydrocyon.	

==== Eulipotyphlans ====
Eulipotyphlans reported from the Sharps Formation
Genus	Species	Location	Stratigraphic position	Material	Notes	Images
Arctoryctes	A. terrenus	Wounded Knee Area.		Humeri.	A proscalopid also found in the Rosebud Formation.	
Domnina	D. dakotensis	Wounded Knee Area.		Mandible.	A shrew.	
Domnina	D. greeni	Wounded Knee Area.		Fragment of left mandible (SDSM 5895).	A shrew.	
Domninoides	D. evelynae	Wounded Knee Area.		Mandibles.	Species reassigned to Proscalops.	
Ocajila	O. makpiyahe	Wounded Knee Area.		Fragment of left mandible (SDSM 56105) & LACM 9491.	A gymnure.	
Palaeoscalopus	P. pineridgensis	Wounded Knee Area.		2 dentaries.	Junior synonym of Quadrodens wilsoni.	
Proscalops	P. evelynae	Wounded Knee Area.			A proscalopid.	
Quadrodens	Q. wilsoni	Wounded Knee Area.		Dentaries.	A talpid mole.	
Talpidae	Genus indeterminate	Wounded Knee Area.		Fragments of 2 upper molars (SDSM 5898).	A talpid mole.	
Trimylus	T. sp.	Wounded Knee Area.		A dentary fragment (LACM 9380) formerly assigned to Ocajila.	A shrew.	

==== Lagomorphs ====
Lagomorphs reported from the Sharps Formation
Genus	Species	Location	Stratigraphic position	Material	Notes	Images
Megalagus	M. primitivus	Wounded Knee Area.		Mandibles.	A leporid.	
?Palaeolaginae		Wounded Knee Area.		Fragment of left mandible (SDSM 5542).	A leporid.	
Palaeolagus	P. hypsodus	Wounded Knee Area.		Skull & jaw elements.	A leporid.	
Palaeolagus	P. philoi	Wounded Knee Area.		Jaw elements.	A leporid.	

==== Metatherians ====
Metatherians reported from the Sharps Formation
Genus	Species	Location	Stratigraphic position	Material	Notes	Images
Herpetotherium	H. youngi	Wounded Knee Area.		Jaw elements & teeth.	A herpetotheriid originally reported as Peratherium spindleri.	
Peratherium	P. spindleri	Wounded Knee Area.		Jaw elements & teeth.	Junior synonym of Herpetotherium youngi.	

==== Primates ====
Primates reported from the Sharps Formation
Genus	Species	Location	Stratigraphic position	Material	Notes	Images
Ekgmowechashala	E. philotau	Wounded Knee Area.		Jaw elements.	An adapiform.	

==== Rodents ====
Rodents reported from the Sharps Formation
Genus	Species	Location	Stratigraphic position	Material	Notes	Images
Capacikala	C. gradatus	Wounded Knee Area.		Skull elements.	A castorid also known from the John Day Formation.	
Capatanka	C. cankpeopi	Wounded Knee Area.		Skull elements.	A castorid.	
Eumys	E. blacki	Wounded Knee Area.		Right ramus (SDSM 5574).	A cricetid.	
Eumys	E. woodi	Wounded Knee Area.		Jaw elements.	A cricetid.	
Florentiamys	F. agnewi	Wounded Knee Area.		Fragment of left ramus (SDSM 55120).	A florentiamyid.	
Grangerimus	G. dakotensis	Wounded Knee Area.		Crania.	A geomyid.	
Heliscomys	H. species indeterminate	Wounded Knee Area.		4 isolated molars (SDSM 54365).	A heliscomyid.	
Hitonkala	H. andersontau	Wounded Knee Area.		Skull elements.	A heteromyid.	
Meniscomys	M. hippodus	Wounded Knee Area.		Left ramus (SDSM 56113).	An aplodontid.	
Palaeocastor	P. nebrascensis	Wounded Knee Area.		Numerous skull elements.	A castorid.	
Pleurolicus	P. clasoni	Wounded Knee Area.		Fragment of right ramus (SDSM 54388).	A geomyid.	
Pleurolicus	P. leptophrys	Wounded Knee Area.		Right ramus (SDSM 53380).	A geomyid also known from the Rosebud Formation.	
Proheteromys	P. bumpi	Wounded Knee Area.		Jaw elements & teeth.	A heteromyid.	
Proheteromys	P. fedti	Wounded Knee Area.		Right ramus (SDSM 56121).	A heteromyid.	
Proheteromys	P. gremmelsi	Wounded Knee Area.		Left ramus (SDSM 5574).	A heteromyid.	
Prosciurus	P. dawsonae	Wounded Knee Area.		Rami.	An ischyromyid.	
Prosciurus	?P. dawsonae	Wounded Knee Area.		Maxillary fragment (SDSM 5598).	An ischyromyid.	
Scottimus	S. sp. indeterminate	Wounded Knee Area.		2 isolated upper molars (SDSM 58101).	A cricetid.	
Tamias	Species indeterminate	Wounded Knee Area.		9 isolated cheek teeth (SDSM 58100).	A chipmunk.	

==== Ungulates ====
Ungulates reported from the Sharps Formation
Genus	Species	Location	Stratigraphic position	Material	Notes	Images
Agriochoerus	A. sp. indet.	Wounded Knee Area.		Maxillary fragments & lower jaws (SDSM 54161).	A tylopod.	
Arretotherium	A. sp. indeterminate	Wounded Knee Area.		Isolated molars.	An anthracothere.	
Cyclopidius	C. schucherti	Wounded Knee Area.		Skull elements.		
Cyclopidius	C. simus	Wounded Knee Area.		Skull elements.		
Daeodon	D. sp.	Cedar Pass, Badlands National Monument, South Dakota.		Anterior portion of a skull (SDSM 675).	An entelodont, originally reported as Dinohyus.	
Desmatochoerus	D. hatcheri geringensis	Wounded Knee Area.		2 specimens.	An oreodont.	
Desmatochoerus	D. (Paradesmatochoerus) wyomingensis	Wounded Knee Area.		Partial cranium.	An oreodont.	
Diceratherium	D. armatum	Wounded Knee Area.	Middle & very top of the formation.	Skull & tooth.	A rhinoceros.	
Diceratherium	D. gregorii	Wounded Knee Area.		Skull elements.	A rhinoceros.	
Diceratherium	D. cf. gregorii	Wounded Knee Area.		Jaw elements.	A rhinoceros.	
Dinohyus	D. sp.	Cedar Pass, Badlands National Monument, South Dakota.		Anterior portion of a skull (SDSM 675).	Junior synonym of Daeodon.	
Hyracodon	H. apertus	Wounded Knee Area.	Lower part of the formation.	Partial skull (SDSM 54141).	A hyracodontid.	
Hyracodon	? H. sp. indeterminate	Wounded Knee Area.	Rockyford Member.	Partial mandible (SDSM 54183).	A hyracodontid.	
Leptochoerus	L. sp. indeterminate	Wounded Knee Area.		Fragment of ramus (SDSM 56101).	A leptochoerid.	
Leptomeryx	L. sp. indeterminate	Wounded Knee Area.		Ramus fragments.	A leptomerycine.	
Mesoreodon	M. megalodon cf. sweeti	Wounded Knee Area.		Partial cranium (SDSM 54220).	An oreodont.	
Miohippus	M. equiceps	Wounded Knee Area.		Skull elements.	An equid.	
Miohippus	M. near equinanus	Wounded Knee Area.		Jaw elements.	An equid.	
Nanotragulus	N. intermedius	Wounded Knee Area.	Spread throughout the greater portion of the formation.	Numerous jaw elements.	A hypertragulid.	
Nanotragulus	N. cf. loomisi	Wounded Knee Area.		Mandibular & maxillary fragments.	A hypertragulid.	
Oxydactylus	O. cf. wyomingensis	Wounded Knee Area.		Skull elements.	A camelid.	
Oxydactylus	?O. sp. indeterminate	Wounded Knee Area.		Mandible fragments of adults.	A camelid.	

=== Reptiles ===
==== Squamates ====
Squamates reported from the Sharps Formation
Genus	Species	Location	Stratigraphic position	Material	Notes	Images
Amphisbaenidae	Genus indeterminate	Wounded Knee Area.		2 jaw fragments (SDSM 5897).	A worm lizard.	
Anguidae	Genus indeterminate	Wounded Knee Area.		30 jaw fragments (SDSM 5896).	An anguid lizard.	
Iguanidae	Genus indeterminate	Wounded Knee Area.		11 jaw fragments (SDSM 5829).	An iguanid lizard.	
Macrorhineura	M. skinneri	Wounded Knee, Shannon County, South Dakota.		Anterior portion of skull (LACM 9249).	A worm lizard.	
Peltosaurus	P. granulosus	Sharps Corner, South Dakota.	Upper part of the formation.	Multiple specimens.	A glyptosaurine lizard also known from the Monroe Creek Formation.	
Peltosaurus	?P. sp. indeterminate	Wounded Knee Area.		Jaw fragment (SDSM 5578).	A glyptosaurine lizard.	

== See also ==
- List of fossiliferous stratigraphic units in South Dakota
- Paleontology in South Dakota
