= Eoarctos =

Eoarctos Temporal range: Late Eocene to Early Oligocene, ~32–31 Ma
- Skull diagram in dorsal, lateral, and ventral views

Scientific classification
- Kingdom: Animalia
- Phylum: Chordata
- Class: Mammalia
- Order: Carnivora
- Family: †Subparictidae
- Genus: †Eoarctos; Wang et al., 2023

Type species
- †Eoarctos vorax Wang et al., 2023

Extinct genus of carnivoran mammal

Eoarctos is an extinct genus of arctoid carnivorans, known from the latest Eocene to early Oligocene of North Dakota and Nebraska. It is known from several remains, the most notable of which is the almost perfectly preserved skeleton of a large male. It was comparable in build and size to a fisher or small raccoon, with an estimated body mass of 4.3 kg, and possessed a variety of features that indicate a mix of terrestrial and scansorial locomotion. Its most notable feature is its unique dentition, with its massive premolars and hypocarnivorous molars, as well as its robust mandible, indicating that it consumed hard-shelled prey, possibly making it the oldest molluscivorous carnivoran known.

== Discovery and etymology ==
Fossils belonging to Eoarctos were first discovered in the 1940s, when its unique jaws were found at the Fitterer Ranch fossil site in North Dakota, but not described until decades afterward, although they were occasionally referred to the species Subparictis dakotensis. In 1982, a crew led by paleontologist Robert Emry an almost complete, beautifully preserved fossil of a male arctoid, which was later designated as holotype (name-bearing specimen) USNM 637259. Emry and his colleague Richard Tedford, who recognized that the fossil represented a new species, planned to describe it, but the already slow moving project remained unfinished after the death of Tedford in 2011. However, several other paleontologists were invited by Emry to continue the project, and the description of Eoarctos vorax was finally published in 2023. So far remains of this taxon, nicknamed "kitten-otter-bear" by its describers, only been discovered in the Fitterer Ranch locality, which dates to the late Orellan or early Whitneyan, and an outcrop of the Chadronian Chadron Formation near Roundtop, Nebraska.

The genus name is a combination of Eos, the Greek goddess of the dawn, and arctos, “bear”, while the species name vorax is Latin for “voracious eater”.

== Description ==
=== Skull and dentition ===
The general skull proportions of Eoarctos are similar to those of early canids, such as Hesperocyon, although the rostrum and frontal shield are broader, the orbital area between the postorbital process of frontal and the postorbital constriction more elongated. Their snout appears to be relatively short, however this is the result of its broadening and not any shortening. Atypically, the sutures between individual skull bones are very strongly fused even among young adult individuals, which may be an adaption for its durophagous diet. Whereas the premaxilla and maxilla are completely fused, there is an unfused suture between the premaxilla and the nasal, indicating a rather wide nasal process and likely resulting in a gap between the posterior tips of premaxilla and anterior tips of the frontal not seen in modern ursids. The flat surface of the wide frontal suggests that it lacked the domed forehead typical for early canids. The crests located just behind the postorbital process form a sharp ridge, with a thin grove located just in front of it and slight bulges along the central segment. The sagittal crest is comparatively high, especially at its posterior end. The postorbital constriction, which has a minimum width of 13.13 mm, is located 13.5 mm caudal to the postorbital process, which is more than twice the distance seen in early canids. This is because many ursoids, including Eoarctos, possessed an elongated postorbital area, with a possible explanation being that their brains are less inflated than those of canids. The laterally expanding wings of the interparietal form a large attachment area for the temporalis muscle. The relatively smooth supraoccipital shield also creates a large and wide concavity for attachments of deep neck muscles, markedly the rectus capitis dorsalis major. It possesses a strong zygomatic arch, with a dorsal rim that curves smoothly on the right side and has a small postorbital on the left side. The distinct medial rim of the rim of the squamosal process creates a distinct, flat, dorsolaterally facing area. This feature seems to be unique to Eoarctos, although many other taxa lack similarly well-preserved zygomatic arches, making comparison difficult. This area of the arch didn't possess any muscular attachments, but was likely related to the processing of hard food, possibly being related to the attachment of the masseter musculature between the ascending ramus and zygomatic arch. The lateral scar for the attachment of the masseter muscle is prominent and runs the entire length of the jugal. Another unique feature of the genus is a distinct, large muscle scar area located between bullae, which crosses over to the basisphenoid surface. Among modern wolves and pandas, this scar serves as attachment area for the longus capitis and rectus capitis ventralis muscles, however it is located farther anteriorly in Eoarctos than in these extant carnivorans. Eoarctos possessed a moderately inflated bulla, across the ventral surface of which a distinct ridge runs across half of its diagonal length.

The coronoid process of the mandible is proportionally quite large, tall, and wide, with a rectangular outline when viewed laterally. The anterior border is mediolaterally thick, indicating a large masseteric fossa muscle, which is quite deep and can be divided into ventral and dorsal portions. It also possessed a well-developed superficial temporalis muscle. A unique, longitudinal groove is located in the ventral border of the horizontal ramus. The bone is distinctly swollen on the lingual and buccal sides of the groove, which is therefore flanked by two longitudinal rims. These rims are asymmetrical in the posterior half of the groove, and the buccal ones are elevated, with the overall muscle attachment areas being slightly tilted dorsally and lingually. As the bone textures suggest muscle attachment, the likeliest explanation for this groove is the insertion of the digastric muscle. However, the lateral facet of the paroccipital process, where the digastric muscle originates, is not enlarged. Such a distinct groove is not found in other carnivorans, although the extinct, durophagous otter Siamogale shares the unusually thickened horizontal ramus with a rough ventral surface. Another possible explanation for this unusual feature is the attachment of the genioglossus muscle. The horizontal ramus is greatly thickened, measuring 6.9 mm in mediolateral thickness and only 12.7 mm deep, resulting in a ratio of thickness to depth of 0.54, comparable to Siamogale and the bone-crushing canid Borophagus. However, considering the massive proportions of the jaw, the symphysis is rather weak. Notably, the two hemimandibles are not fused, possibly because of unilateral bites during maximum exertions.

Among the upper incisors, I1 and I2 have similar dimensions, except for the crown height, whereas the I3 is almost twice as large. The same dimensions can be observed in the lower incisors, with the third incisor being twice as large as the first two. A cutting blade is formed by a chisel-like cutting edge at the top of their crowns, while the lingual surface possesses a shovel-like concave surface. The robust canine is proportionally shorter and less curved than in Hesperocyon, and its enamel surface lacks the distinct groove seen in some other arctoids. The lower canine protrudes forwards, and possesses a bulbous base. Among many arctoids, the canines showcase signs of sexual dimorphism, however, this does not seem to be the case in Eoarctos. As in other subparictids, the premolars are robust and enlarged, however this development is more advanced in Eoarctos than in other members of the family. These teeth are broadened relative to their length, and, typically for arctoids, possess a surrounding cingulum while lacking the anterior and posterior accessory cusps seen in canids. Another features it shares with other derived subparictids is are the extensive crenulated textures found on the enamel surfaces of their upper premolars. The P1 is the smallest upper premolar, and there is almost no diastema separating it and the slightly larger P2. As in Nothocyon the P3 possesses a prominent lingual bulge supported by an extra root, although this feature is more extremely developed in Eoarctos. A cingulum, which is thickest mesially and lingually, surrounds the P4. The protocone is lingually dispalaced, and the paracone buccolingually thickened, resulting in the occlusal outline of the tooth being overall widened. Among the lower premolar, the single rooted p1 is reduced in size relatively to the other teeth. The other premolars are double rooted, and p1-p3 possess ridges along the occlusal surface from the anterior margin, which almost appear as a single ridge if seen from occlusal view. The p2 and p3 are of similar dimensions and shape as one another, but the p4 is notably larger. As in other ursoids, the upper molars appear to be mesiodistally lengthened and furthermore possess a somewhat rectangular outline. Both M1 and M2 have protocones with mesiodistally greatly expanded preprotocrista and postprotocrista as well as enlarged paraconule and metaconule, whereas the lingual cingulum is shortened. The first lower molar (m1) is low crowned, with a trigonid that is not even half the height of the talonid. A distinct but low carnassial blade is formed by the paraconid and protoconid. The wear facet of the tooth indicates contact with the lingual surface of the P4 carnassial blade and a paraconule as well as the paracone of M1. A notable feature of the m2 is the extreme shift of the strongly reduced trigonid to the mesiolingual corner of the tooth. Relative to m1, m2 is reduced in anteroposterior length, and m3 is completely absent. The molars show adaptions towards hypocarnivory.

=== Postcranial skeleton ===
The overall build of Eoarctos was comparable to that of a raccoon or fisher, with an unspecialized neck and predominantly terrestrial locomotion, and it possessed a mix of plesiomorphic and advanced features. Its baculum was overall similar to that of Hesperocyon, although with a deeper urethral groove at its proximal end, and not as derived as that of later ursids.

Its scapula had a roughly trapezoid outline, which is diagonally divided by a gently curved spine and possesses nearly parallel cranial and caudal borders. The cranially protruding supraspinous fossa is similar to that of other arctoids but unlike the straighter cranial border found in Canis. It furthermore possessed a well-developed coracoid process, which extends medially and slightly hooks caudally and is present in neither modern carnivorans nor Amphicynodon, but can be found in early carnivorans such as Viverravus. The clavicle of Eoarctos is functional, a plesiomorphic retention from its miacid ancestors that is not found in modern ursids. The robust humerus possessed a rounded head and a greatly expanded lateral supracondylar crest and a large medial epicondyle, and did not share the slender proportions of cursorial carnivorans. The greater tubercle is poorly developed and rather low, similar to that of Amphicynodon but unlike the one found in Hesperocyon. The crest of the greater tubercle is quite indistinct, leading to a less prominent deltoid tuberosity and therefore a straighter humerus than seen in early carnivorans. The distal third of the humerus shaft is occupied by a proximally expanded lateral supracondylar crest, the proximal end of which arises sharply, creating a fan-shaped outline. This outline is also seen in modern ursids, although these possess more distally located crests than Eoarctos. The distinct deltoid tuberosity and a crista for pectoralis muscles extending from the greater tubercle is weakly developed, unlike in fossorial carnivorans, and the reduced deltopectoral crest suggests it was terrestrial and not arboreal. Both the ulna and the radius, which has an enlarged head, are robust with strong shafts. The ulna's relatively long olecranon leans anteriorly and possesses a strong tilt toward the medial side in cranial view. The trochlear notch is neither deep and narrow, as in cursorial taxa such as Hesperocyon, nor is the olecranon as elongated and enlarged as those of aquatic and fossorial taxa.

Among the wrist bones, the left cuneiform is similar to that of raccoons, and the left pisiform possesses a large head, which protrudes ventrally and posteriorly for the insertion of the flexor carpi ulnaris muscle. It is more robust, shorter and less ventrally protruding than that of arboreal primates. The metacarpus was likely widely spread, and the metatarsals are considerably longer than the metacarpals. The fourth metacarpal has a noticeably enlarged facet for articulation with the uniform, with a maximum mediolateral width that is about equal to that of the dorsoventral length, unlike in most other carnivorans. This leaves no room for the fifth metacarpals' articulation with the unciform. As the indistinct ventral crest on the ventral aspect of the head doesn't extend to its distal face, as it does in cursorial canids, it's likely that Eoarctos posture was plantigrade, with proximal phalanges not capable of hyperextension. Its middle fingers (MC II and MC III) are longer than its side fingers, with the great size difference between MC III and MC II and IV being a unique feature of this genus. The phalanges of the hand are shorter than those of the foot. The length ratio of the MC III compared to that of the third proximal phalanx, which has been used as an indicator for cursorial vs. arboreal adaptations, is 1.88, comparable to sloth bears (1.88) and raccoons (1.95). Its claws were deep, and the middle phalanges lack the adaptions seen in felids for their retraction.

The proportions of the femur are similar to those of other arctoids, but wider and shorter than those of canids. The greater trochanter is of the same height as the femoral head, as in Canis, but unlike the condition seen in modern ursids, but its intertrochanteric crest, which is well-developed in canids, is almost indistinguishable, with a trochanteric fossa that isn't particular steep or excavated. The moderately developed lesser trochanter projects medially, as in fishers, and a third trochanter that is slightly more developed than that of miacids. The trochlea is intermediate in size and depth between those of canids and ursids. The femoral head indicates a rather low abduction during hind limb movements, and overall more restricted movements. However, the laterally oriented acetabulum suggests that abduction is still permitted. Overall, the features show a combination of various modes of locomotion, indicating that it was predominantly scansorial but retained the ability to climb trees. Like that of other arctoids, its tibia lacked the prominent tuberosity typical for canids, and a rather straight cranial border, without the widening of the proximal tibia seen in cursorial canids. The slightly medially bowed tibia shaft results in a bigger distance between the tibia and fibula. The orientation of the trochlea indicates that it was may have been capable of performing hindfoot reversal, although Wang et al. consider this unlikely due to the rarity of this feature in modern carnivorans. The astragalar head is strongly curved, further indicating considerable flexibility in its tarsal joints.

== Phylogeny ==
Eoarctos is a member of the Subparictidae, a family of early-branching ursoids restricted to North America. The distribution of this family, as well as that of a variety of other early arctoids, indicates that North America played a major role in the diversification of these carnivorans. This diversification, alongside that of the related canids, occurred around the Eocene-Oligocene boundary, during a time in which open environments became more and more common, and terrestrials and even cursorial adaptions evolved in response. Within its family, Eoarctos is recovered as sister taxon to Nothocyon, which shares its adaptions towards durophagy.

Below is the phylogeny recovered by Wang et al. (2023):

- Caniformia
  - Miacis sylvestris
  - - Miacis gracillis
    - - Canidae
      - Arctoidea
        - Cynodictis spp.
        - - Gustafsonia cognita
          - - Amphicyonidae
            - - - - Zodiolestes daimonelixensis
                  - - Pinnipedia
                    - Musteloidea
              - - Subparictidae
                  - - Subparictis gilpini
                    - Subparictis parvus
                  - - Subparictis montanus
                    - - Subparictis dakotensis
                      - - Parictis primaevus
                        - - Eoarctos vorax
                          - Nothocyon geismarianus
                - Ursidae
                  - Amphicynodon leptorhynchus
                  - Campylocynodon personi
                  - Drassodon harpagops
                  - - - Allocyon loganensis
                      - - Cephalogale spp.
                        - Ursus arctos

== Paleobiology ==
=== Locomotion ===
A large variety of features, including the presence of an astragalar foramen, metatarsals without a keel on the distal face of their head, and widespread toes and fingers, showcases that Eoarctos was a plantigrade animal. This is typical for most caniforms, with only some canids and possibly hemicyonines and the amphicyonid Cynodictis having evolved a digitigrade stance. The limb joints were capable of wide-ranging rotations, unlike those of cursorial carnivorans, indicating that this arctoid was not a pursuit predator. It also lacks the powerful limbs and flexible vertebrate columns typical for semifossorial and semiaquatic species. There are, however, indications that it was capable of climbing trees. Most of these are plesiomorphic features, typical for earlier carnivorans, including a deep claw and a full-length clavicle. This claw is quite similar to that of felids, being thin and dorsoventrally deep, although Eoarctos was not able to retract its claws. It also lacks the more extreme arboreal adaptions of other carnivorans, such as the prehensile tail seen in the kinkajou. There are furthermore features suggesting a more terrestrial lifestyle, such as the reduced deltopectoral crest on humerus and the long third metacarpal, indicating it was able to travel rather large distances and covering large home ranges, although these are not as strongly developed as in modern ursids. Overall, Eoarctos was likely similar to raccoons and fishers in its lifestyle, spending most of its time foraging on the ground, but being capable of escaping into trees when faced with danger.

=== Pathology and diet ===
Numerous Eoarctos fossils showcase signs of frequent dental injuries, with two out of the six specimens preserving the skull parts necessary for comparison, including the holotype, showcase loss of premolars, and extensive, painful infections that may have temporarily disabled them from feeding on hard objects. The holotype had lost the crowns of several premolars, and two full teeth, with its alveolar bone density being strongly reduced. It is likely that the injuries observed in the holotype were sustained while crushing hard shells with its premolars, breaking p3-4 of its lower right teeth, resulting in open wounds and infections including periapical infection, osteomyelitis, and severe closure of the mandibular canal. During this time, the animal was forced to use its left teeth for processing food, and broke its upper left teeth while crushing another hard object. As it shows no signs of other injuries or predation, it is likely that these two separate wounds prevented it from processing food and forced it to starve. However, another specimen with similar injuries survived into old age, despite the loss of its premolars, as it shifted the main focus of crushing hard objects to the first lower molars, which showcase extensive wear. All this suggests that Eoarctos fed on hard-shelled food, most likely mollusks, which would make it the oldest known arctoid with a durophagous diet, although its teeth were not yet strong enough to resist breakage. These adaptions are surprising, since adaptions towards a durophagous diet most commonly occur among much larger taxons. It may have also supplemented its diet with fruits and carrion.

=== Brain ===
The external brain morphology of Eoarctos is rather simple, as expected from a basal caniform, with a relatively large cerebellum, small cerebrum, and large olfactory lobe. The cerebrums lateral aspect is smooth and globular, lacking the elaborations seen in larger carnivorans. It possibly possessed the proportionally largest olfactory bulb compared to its cerebrum of all carnivorans, but due to the lack of comparable data for other taxa it is unclear if this is the result of an enlarging of the bulb itself, possibly correlated with the development of its olfactory sensory, or because of the lack on enlargement of the cerebrum. The endocast is overall similar to that of Hesperocyon, and less complex than that of the early amphicyonid Daphoenus. However, its Encephalization Quotient of 0.427 is much lower than that of Hesperocyon (0.71) and the similarly progressive carnivoran Paragale (0.59-0.70), and more comparable to those of the hyaenodont Thinocyon (0.41–0.49) and the miacid Procynodictis (0.44–0.52). This Quotient indicates, along with its mode of location, that Eoarctos was a solitary predator. This is furthermore supported by the starvation of the holotype following its dental injuries, indicating alack of social care for young adults.

=== Palaeoecology ===
Eoarctos, and other members of its family, lived alongside, and possibly competed with, early canids such as Hesperocyon and Leptocyon, although they were far less common and seem to have been more geographically restricted. As subparictids have mostly been recovered from the periphery of the White River Group, they may have avoided competition by being spatially separated from canids, which were extremely common in large parts of the White River Group. Eoarctos likely inhabited woodlands with extensive canopy coverage, but may also have lived in the peripheries of nearby savannas. They likely possessed large home ranges, stretching from a few km^{2} in wooded terrains to tens of km^{2} in more open areas, and were capable of travelling distances of tens of kilometers in a single day. They may have foraged alongside of riparian areas, typical for the Fitterer Channel locality, but as they lacked semiaquatic adaptions they likely searched for their mollusk prey alongside river banks and while wading into shallow water. It shared its habitat with a variety of other mammals, including the marsupials Herpetotherium and Nanodelphys, the oreodont Miniochoerus, the ruminant Leptomeryx, the canid Osbornodon and the bat Quinetia. Furthermore, a large variety of rodents, including at least 18 taxons, among them species of Ischyromys, Heliscomys and Agnotocastor, are known from the Fitterer Ranch locality. Remains of the softshell-turtle Apalone, as well as eggshells belonging to birds, have also been discovered.
