= Harrisonsaurus =

Harrisonsaurus Temporal range: Miocene

Scientific classification
- Domain: Eukaryota
- Kingdom: Animalia
- Phylum: Chordata
- Class: Reptilia
- Order: Squamata
- Suborder: Iguania
- Family: Iguanidae
- Genus: †Harrisonsaurus; Holman, 1981

Type species
- †Harrisonsaurus fossilis Holman, 1981

Extinct genus of lizards

Harrisonsaurus is an extinct genus of iguanid lizard from the Lower Miocene of Nebraska. It was named in 1981 by Holman for a lower jaw bone found in the Harrison Formation showing a deep jaw, with the single specimen named as the new species H. fossilis. The jaw and teeth show the most similarities to Enyalioides and similar iguanids.
