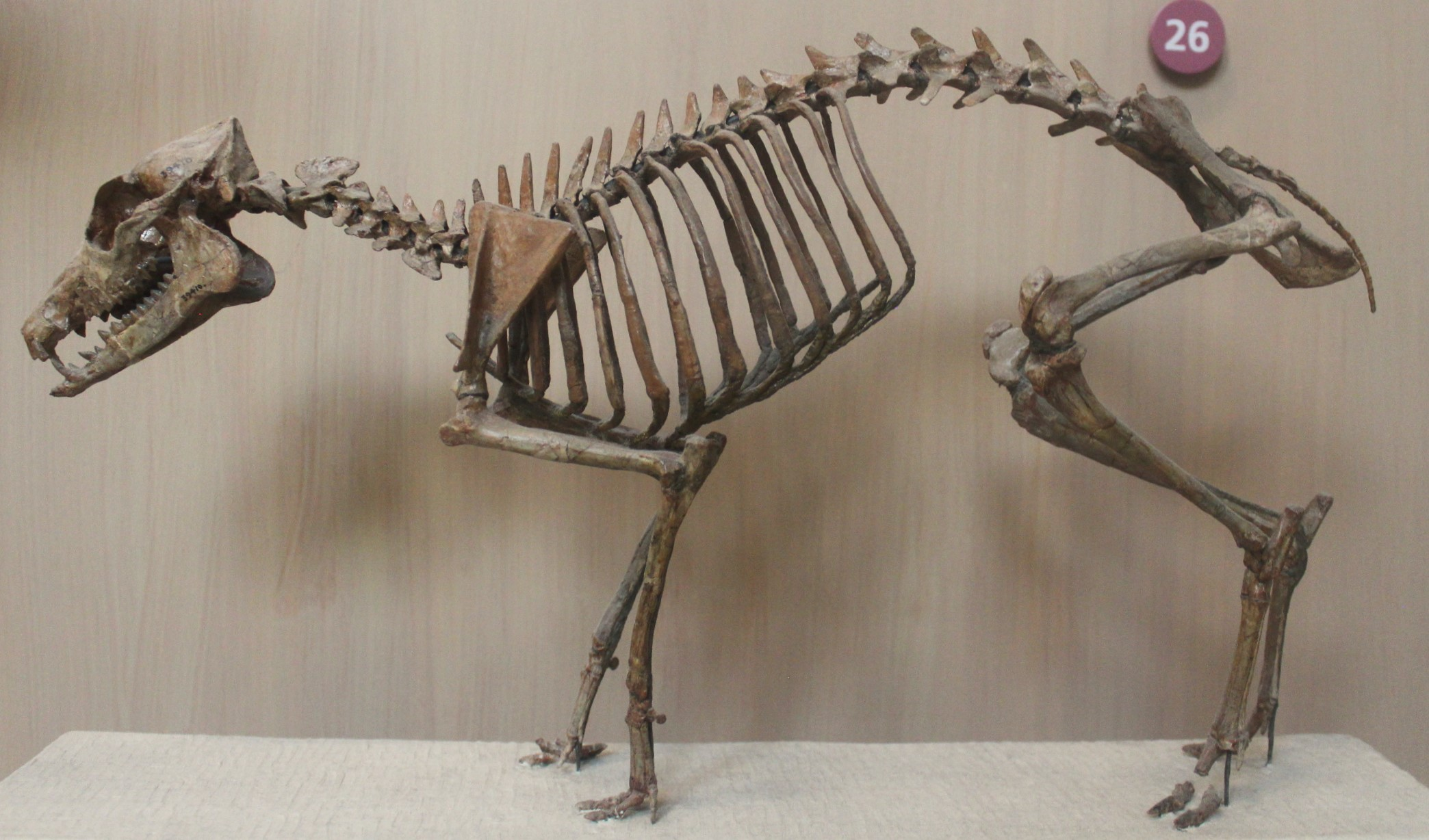

Scientific classification
- Kingdom: Animalia
- Phylum: Chordata
- Class: Mammalia
- Order: Artiodactyla
- Family: †Hypertragulidae
- Genus: †Hypertragulus; Cope, 1874

Species
- See text

= Hypertragulus =

Hypertragulus Temporal range: Late Eocene–Middle Miocene

Extinct genus of mammals

Hypertragulus is an extinct genus of hypertragulid ruminant endemic to North America. It lived from the Late Eocene to the Middle Miocene, living 37.2 to 16 million years ago, existing for approximately 21.2 million years.

Hypertragulus were primitive and ancient ruminants, resembling small deer or musk deer, although they were more closely related to modern chevrotains. Its diet is stated to be that of a frugivore.

== Species ==
- H. calcaratus
- H. chadronensis
- H. crawfordensis
- H. dakotensis
- H. heikeni
- H. hesperius
- H. minor
- H. minutus
- H. planiceps
- H. quadratus
- H. sequens

== Fossil distribution ==
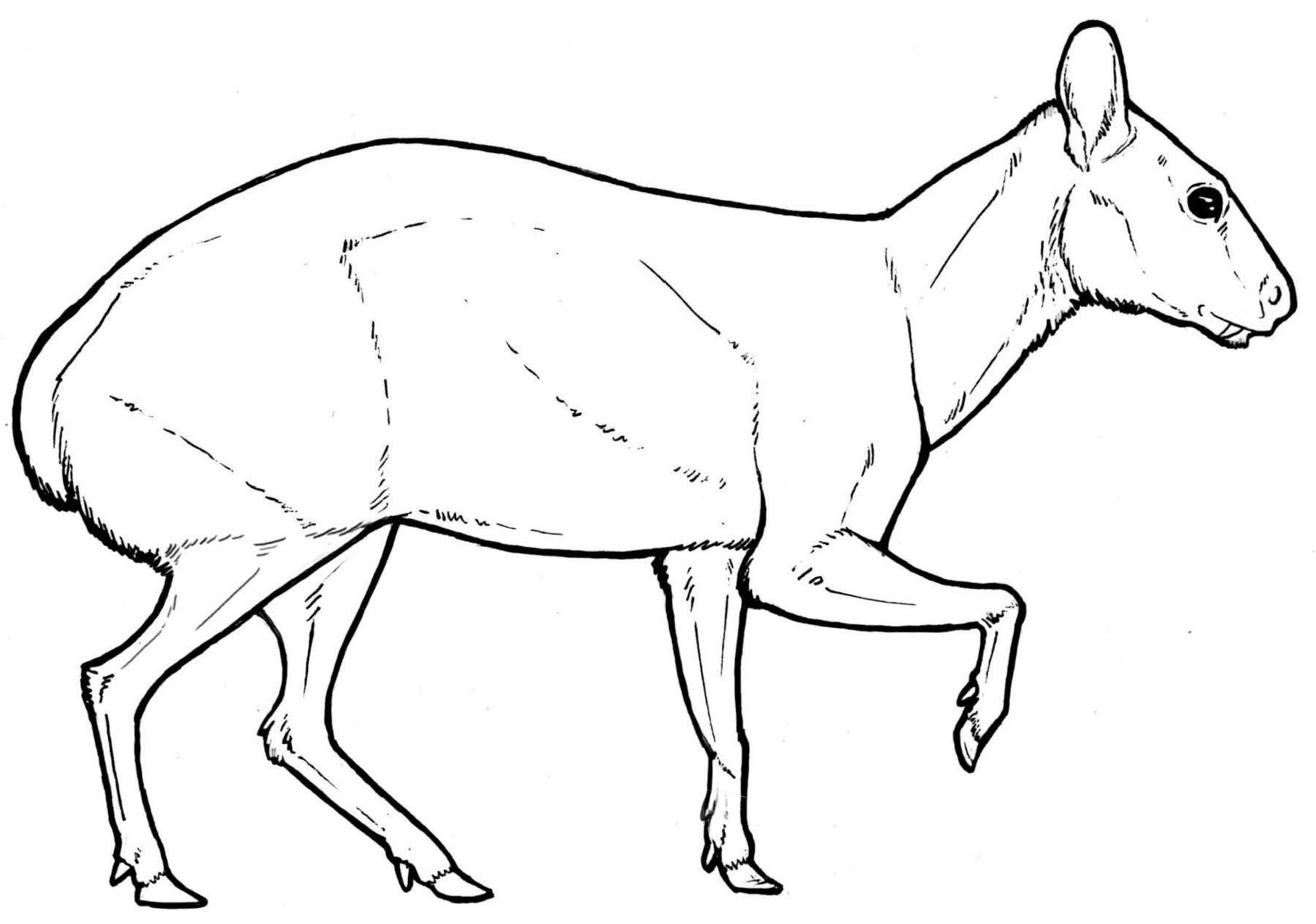
Life restoration

A partial list of fossil sites:

- Chihuahua, Mexico
- Cedar Creek Formation (Lower & Middle), Logan County, Colorado
- Fort Logan Formation, Meagher County, Montana
- Upper Pomerado Conglomerate Formation, San Diego County, California
- Turtle Cove Member of the John Day Formation, Grant County, Oregon

== Palaeoecology ==
Because its fossils are found predominantly in semiarid palaeosols, it is believed that Hypertragulus hesperius primarily inhabited semiarid biomes.
