= Subparictis =

Subparictis Temporal range: Chadronian to Whitneyan

Scientific classification
- Kingdom: Animalia
- Phylum: Chordata
- Class: Mammalia
- Order: Carnivora
- Family: †Subparictidae
- Genus: †Subparictis; Clark and Guensburg, 1972

Type species
- †Subparictis gilpini Clark and Guensburg, 1972

Species
- Subparictis dakotensis; Subparictis montanus; Subparictis parvus

Extinct genus of carnivores

Subparictis is an extinct genus of carnivoran mammals in the family Subparictidae that inhabited North America.

== Taxonomy & evolution ==
Subparictis was originally described as a subgenus of Parictis for Parictis (Subparictis) gilpini in 1972. It also included three other species: S. dakotensis, which had first been described in 1936; S. parvus, which was first described in 1967; and S. montanus, which was described in the same 1972 paper that named the subgenus.

The genus Parictis was revised, and Subparictis elevated to a full genus, in an extensive re-description in 1996. It is assigned to the early arctoid family Subparictidae as of 2023.
