= Subparictidae =

Subparictidae Temporal range: Chadronian - Arikareean 37–22 Ma

Scientific classification
- Kingdom: Animalia
- Phylum: Chordata
- Class: Mammalia
- Order: Carnivora
- Superfamily: Ursoidea
- Family: †Subparictidae; Baskin and Tedford, 1996

Genera
- †Subparictis; †Parictis; †Nothocyon; †Eoarctos

Extinct family of early Paleogene arctoid carnivorans

Subparictidae is an extinct family of early Paleogene arctoid carnivorans endemic to North America closely related to bears. They were small, raccoon-like mammals that lived from the Eocene to the early Miocene. This family includes a handful of genera such as Subparictis, Parictis, Nothocyon, and Eoarctos.

== Characteristics ==
Unlike other early caniforms, subparictids had simple molars and surrounding or at least partial cingulums.

== Systematics ==
Subparictidae was originally described in 1996 to contain the genera Subparictis, Nothocyon, and Parictis. At the time, it was suggested to be a sister-family to Ursidae. Other authors have placed Parictis and Subparictis in the Amphicynodontidae. A fourth genus, Eoarctos, was described in 2023 and the paper supports a sister grouping of subparictids and ursids.

Below is the phylogeny recovered by Wang et al. (2023):

- Subparictidae
  - - Subparictis gilpini
    - Subparictis parvus
  - - Subparictis montanus
    - - Subparictis dakotensis
      - - Parictis primaevus
        - - Eoarctos vorax
          - Nothocyon geismarianus

== Paleobiology ==
The subparictids were endemic to North America. Fossils have been found dating from the Chadronian through Whitneyan ages of the northern Great Plains of the United States and southern Canada and the Arikareean of Oregon. Early members competed with the earliest canids, and are often found on the periphery in sites where with canid fossils. Over time, the genera Eoarctos and Nothocyon evolved increasingly robust teeth adapted for durophagy. Based on the complete anatomical remains of Eoarctos, the subparictids would have occupied an ecological niche similar to procyonids and wolverines.
