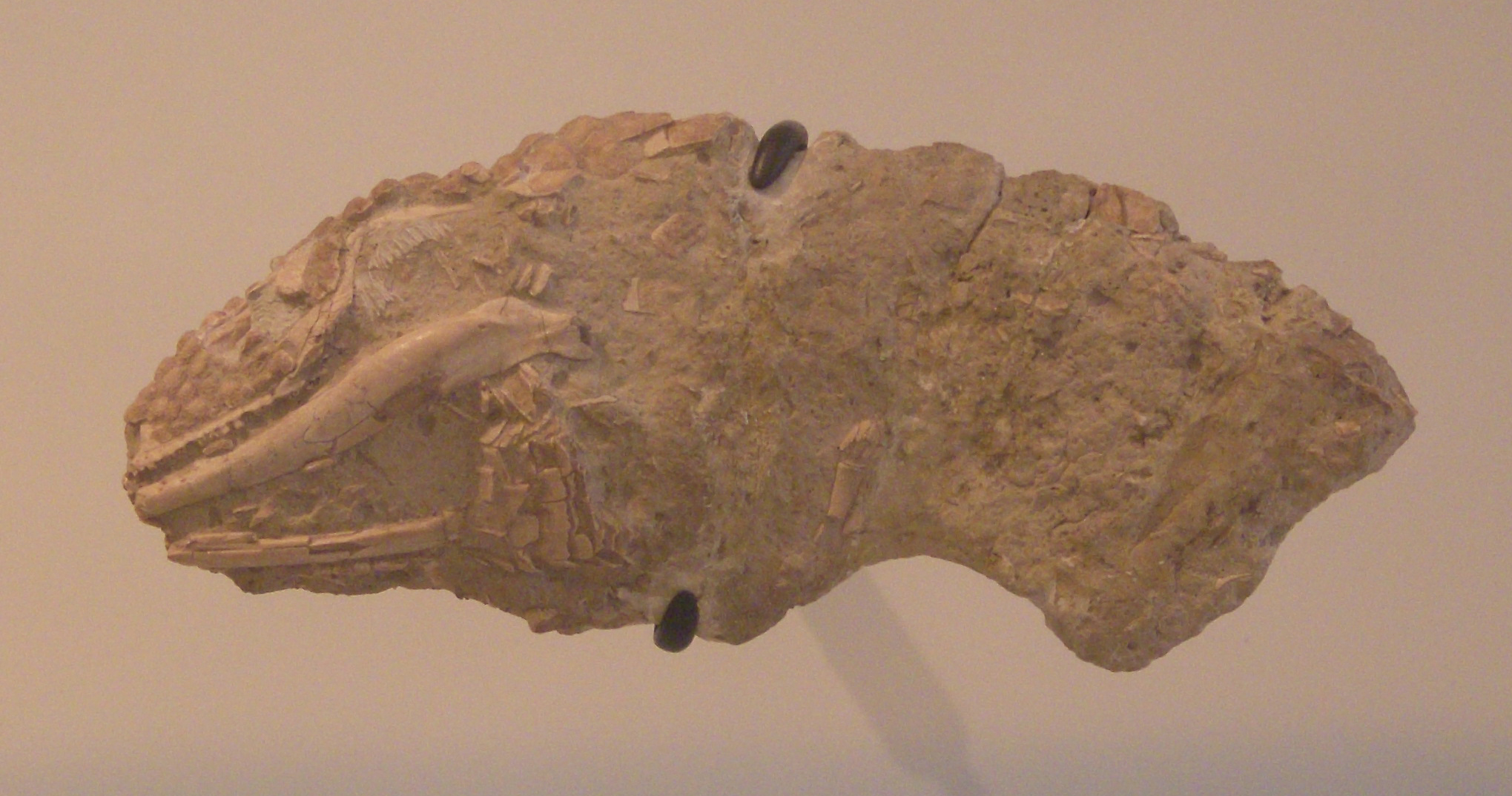
- Fossil of the glyptosaurine Helodermoides tuberculatus

Scientific classification
- Kingdom: Animalia
- Phylum: Chordata
- Class: Reptilia
- Order: Squamata
- Suborder: Anguimorpha
- Family: Anguidae
- Subfamily: †Glyptosaurinae; Marsh, 1872

Subgroups
- †Cadurcopanoplos; †Odaxosaurus; †Paraplacosauriops; †Peltosaurus; †Proxestops; †Sullivanosaurus; †Xestops; †Glyptosaurini; †Glyptosaurus; †Helodermoides; †Paraglyptosaurus; †Placosaurus; †Proglyptosaurus; †Stenoplacosaurus; †Melanosaurini; †Arpadosaurus; †Melanosaurus

= Glyptosaurinae =

Glyptosaurinae Temporal range: Campanian–Oligocene

Extinct subfamily of lizards

Glyptosaurinae is an extinct subfamily of anguid lizards that lived in the Northern Hemisphere during the Late Cretaceous and the Paleogene.

== Description ==
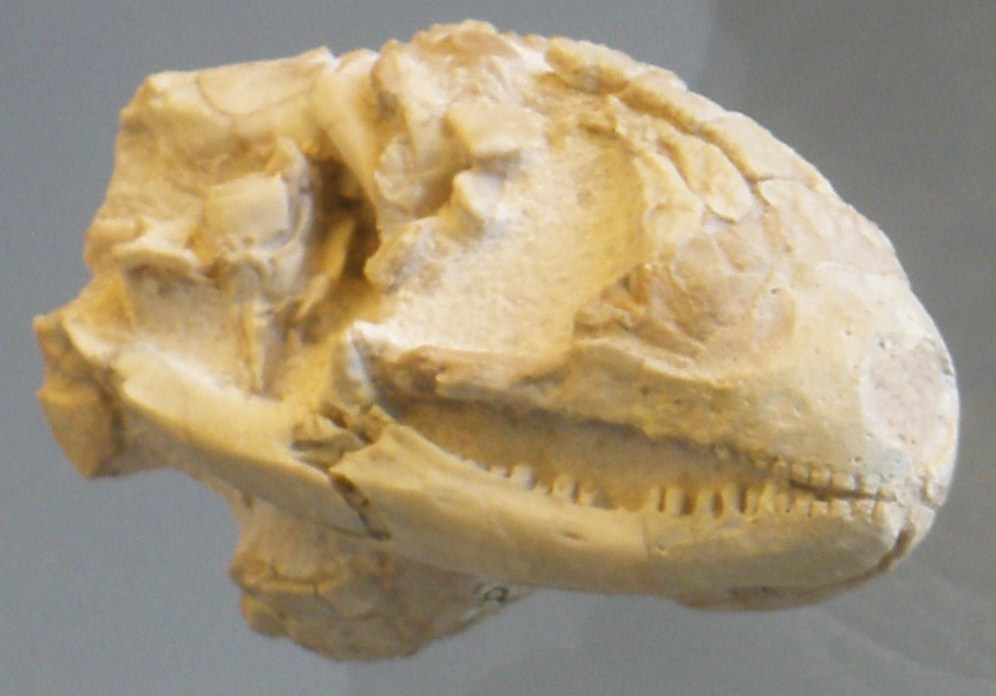
Skull of the glyptosaurine Peltosaurus

Glyptosaurines are known primarily from their osteoderms, scale-like pieces of bone that are embedded in the skin and cover much of their bodies. The shape and extent of the osteoderms in glyptosaurines are similar to those seen in an unrelated group of lizards called Monstersauria, which includes the living Gila monster and beaded lizard. The osteoderms of glyptosaurines are unusually complex, consisting of four distinct layers of bony tissue. These tissues may have derived from both the dermis (the lower layer of the skin) and the epidermis (the outer layer of the skin) during their development in the embryo. The tissue forming the outermost layer of glyptosaurine osteoderms is similar to tooth enamel and has even been given its own name, osteodermine.

Glyptosaurines have been split into the subgroups Melanosaurini and Glyptosaurini, although recent phylogenetic analyses show that Melanosaurini in its traditional sense is paraphyletic, representing an evolutionary grade of glytosaurines more basal ("primitive") than Glyptosaurini. Below is a cladogram from Conrad and Norell (2008) showing the interrelationships of glyptosaurines and their relationship to other anguid lizards:

- Anguimorpha
  - †Carusioidea
  - Anguidae
    - Diploglossinae
    - - - Anguinae
        - Gerrhonotinae
      - †Glyptosaurinae
        - †Odaxosaurus piger
        - - - †Proxestops jepseni
            - †Xestops vagans
          - - - †Paraplacosauriops quercyi
              - †Peltosaurus granulosus
            - - †Melanosaurini sensu stricto
                - †Arpadosaurus gazinorum
                - †Melanosaurus maximus
              - †Glyptosaurini
                - †Glyptosaurus sylvestris
                - †Placosaurus rugosus
                - - †Proglyptosaurus huerfanensis
                  - - †Paraglyptosaurus princeps
                    - - †Helodermoides tuberculatus
                      - - †Placosaurus estesi
                        - †Stenoplacosaurus mongoliensis

== Evolutionary history ==
The earliest known Glyptosaurines like Odaxosaurus are known from the Late Cretaceous (Campanian) of North America. Meanwhile, the oldest occurrence of this group in Europe dates back to the late Paleocene. Only a single species, Stenoplacosaurus mongoliensis dating to the Mid-Eocene, is known from Asia. Glyptosaurines declined after the Mid-Eocene, become extinct in Europe by the end of the period as part of the "Grande Coupure". The youngest known remains of glyptosaurines is Peltosaurus granulosus from the Monroe Creek and upper Sharps formations of Sharps Corner, South Dakota, dating to the mid Oligocene, between 27.4 and 26.4 million years ago. The extinction of glyptosaurines was likely due to a cooling climate during the Oligocene.
