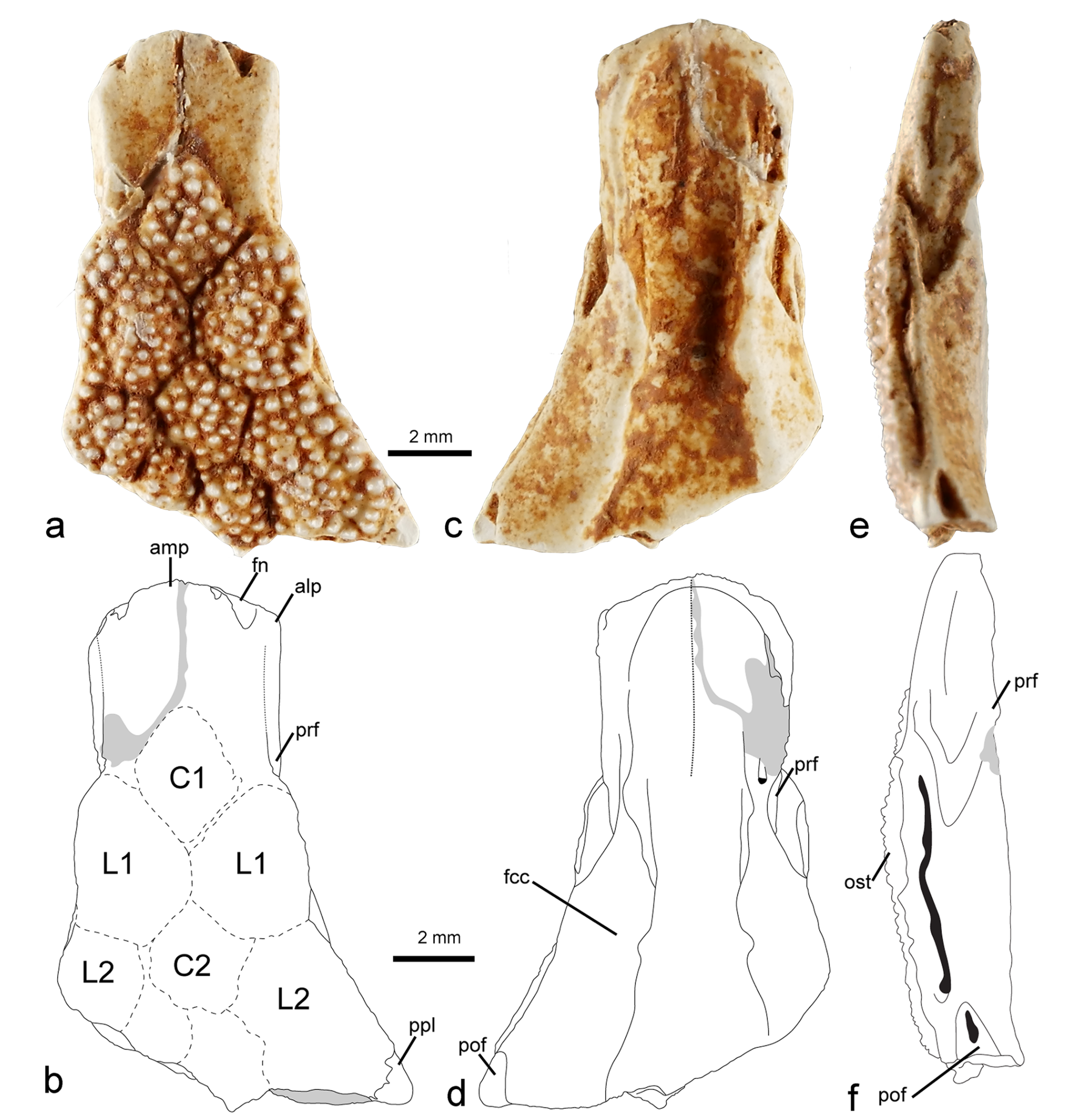
- The holotype of Cadurcaopanoplos shown from multiple views

Scientific classification
- Kingdom: Animalia
- Phylum: Chordata
- Class: Reptilia
- Order: Squamata
- Suborder: Anguimorpha
- Family: Anguidae
- Subfamily: †Glyptosaurinae
- Genus: †Cadurcopanoplos; Lemierre & Ceorgialis, 2025

Type species
- † Cadurcopanoplos vaylatsensis Lemierre & Ceorgialis, 2025

= Cadurcopanoplos =

Cadurcopanoplos Temporal range: Late Eocene

Extinct genus of anguimorph

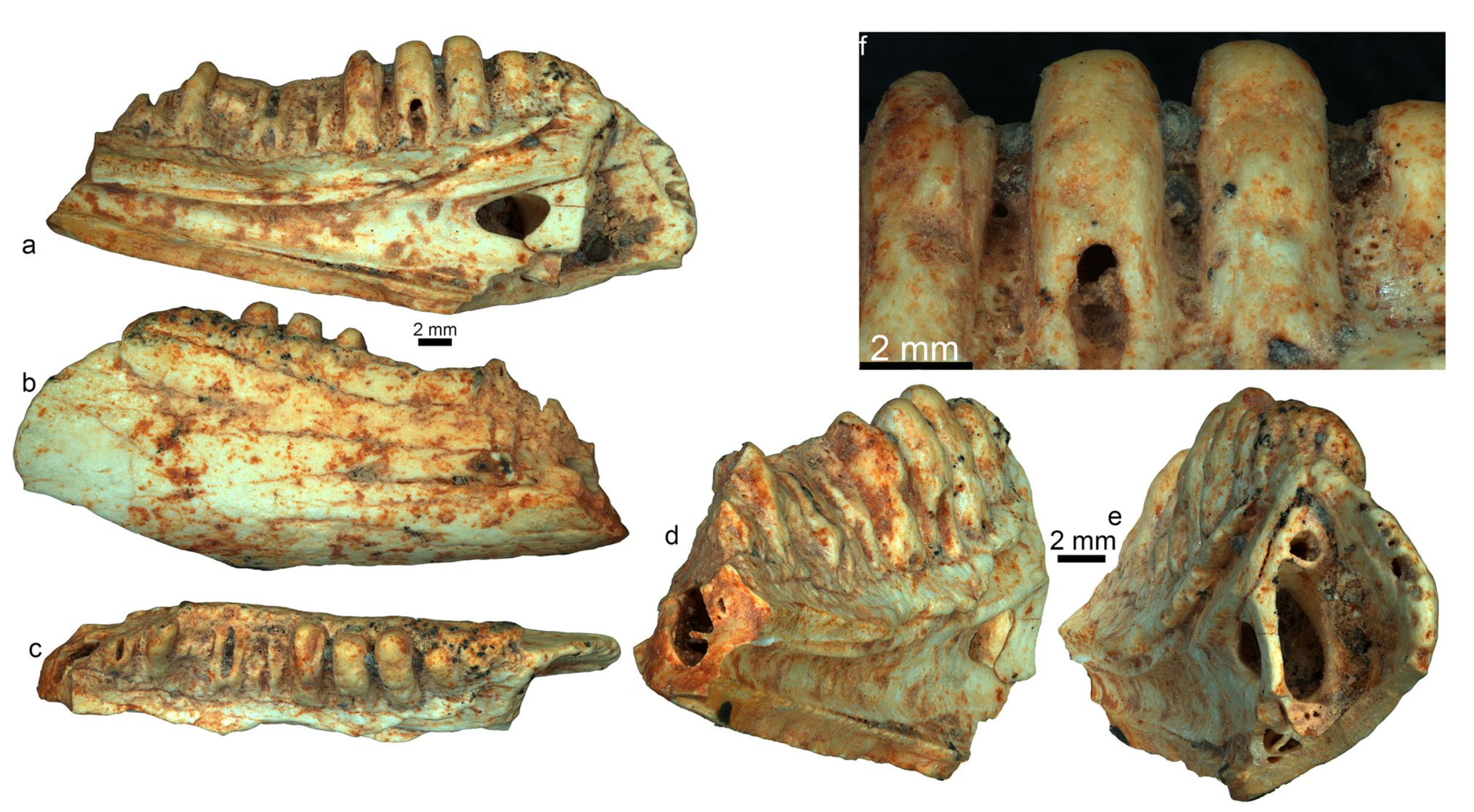
Dentary tentatively referred to Cadurcopanoplos, shown from multiple views

Cadurcopanoplos is an extinct genus of anguimorph from the Late Eocene of southern France. The type and only species is C. vaylatsensis. The genus name is derived from "Cadurcum", the Latin name for the town of Cahors (which is near the locality where fossils of Cadurcopanoplos were discovered) and also the ancient Celtic tribe, the Cadurci, who lived in the area. The second half of the genus name comes from the Ancient Greek work "panoplos", meaning "in full armor", which alludes to the armored skin of Cadurocopanoplos and its relatives. The species epithet refers to the town of Vaylats, which is also near the site where the fossils were discovered.

The holotype of Cadurcopanoplos is a single incomplete frontal bone which was given the specimen number MHNT.PAL.2023.0.31.114. A second fossil, a partial right mandible (specimen UM-BFI 3070), was found at the same locality and was tentatively referred to the genus. This mandible is very heavily built and differs from every other taxon known from the locality, which forms the basis of this referral.

Cadurcopanoplos was assigned to Glyptosauridae based on the osteoderms attached to the skull bone of the holotype. The exact shape and pattern of these osteoderms, which differs from all other known species in this group, was the basis for naming a new genus. The only fossils of Caduropanoplos were discovered in the Quercy Phosphorites Formation in southern France. It was discovered at a locality called La Bouffie near the village of Vaylats. This stratum dates to the Late Eocene epoch.
