= Ocajila =

Ocajila Temporal range: Oligocene

Scientific classification
- Kingdom: Animalia
- Phylum: Chordata
- Class: Mammalia
- Order: Eulipotyphla
- Family: Erinaceidae
- Subfamily: Galericinae
- Genus: †Ocajila; Macdonald, 1963

Extinct genus of hedgehog relative

Ocajila is an extinct genus of erinaceid (hedgehog relative) from the Oligocene of North America. Like many small extinct mammals, it is mainly known from teeth and jaw fragments. Ocajila is sometimes classified within the subfamily Galericinae, alongside the gymnures or moonrats of Southeast Asia.

The teeth of Ocajila are less specialized than later erinaceids, supporting an early-diverging position in the family. For example, it retains three lower incisors of similar size, while later erinaceids lose the third incisor and enlarge the first two. It has a full set of four lower premolars, rather than two or three. The cheek teeth are bunodont in form, with low rounded cusps suited for a more omnivorous diet than its relatives. The trigonid (front portion of each lower molar) is compressed from front-to-back, and the paraconid is reduced to a subtle ridge.

== Species ==
- O. makpiyahe, the type species, was named by Macdonald (1963). It is a rare component of the Sharps Formation of South Dakota and the Gering Formation of Nebraska. Both formations date to the early Arikareean NALMA (around the start of the late Oligocene).
- O. macdonaldi was named by Korth (2022). It is known from a large sample of fossils found in the White Hills fauna, part of the Renova Formation of Montana. It is also present, albeit rare, in the Brule Formation of South Dakota and North Dakota. These formations are all dated to the Whitneyan NALMA (mid-Oligocene). Compared to the other species, O. macdonaldi has sharper and narrower molar teeth, and the upper molars have a distinct paraconule.
- O. rasmusseni was also named by Korth (2022). It is the largest species, from the lower-middle Cabbage Patch Beds of the Renova Formation. This fauna is dated to the early-middle Arikareean.

The oldest Ocajila fossils are a couple of molars from an indeterminate species found in the Cook Ranch fauna of the Renova Formation. This fauna is dated to the late Orellan NALMA (early Oligocene). Ocajila has also been reported from the Otay Formation of California.
