= Paraplacosauriops =

Paraplacosauriops Temporal range: middle Eocene

Scientific classification
- Domain: Eukaryota
- Kingdom: Animalia
- Phylum: Chordata
- Class: Reptilia
- Order: Squamata
- Family: Anguidae
- Subfamily: †Glyptosaurinae
- Genus: †Paraplacosauriops; Auge and Sullivan, 2006

Type species
- †Paraplacosauriops quercyi Filhol, 1882

Extinct genus of lizards

Paraplacosauriops (near Placosauriops) is an extinct genus of anguid lizards from the middle Eocene of France.

== Taxonomy ==
Paraplacosauriops was originally named Plestiodon quercyi by Filhol (1882) on the basis of dentary remains from fissure fill deposits in Quercy, France. Hoffstetter (1944) referred P. quercyi to the glyptosaurine genus Placosaurus, which is likewise endemic to Europe. However, Auge and Sullivan (2006) recognized quercyi as belonging to the tribe Melanosaurini and not a Placosaurus-like glyptosaurin, so they erected Paraplacosauriops for P. quercyi.

== Description ==
Distinguishing features of Paraplacosauriops include a distinguishing heterodont dentition, especially the anterior teeth being extremely slender, pointed and not peg-like.
