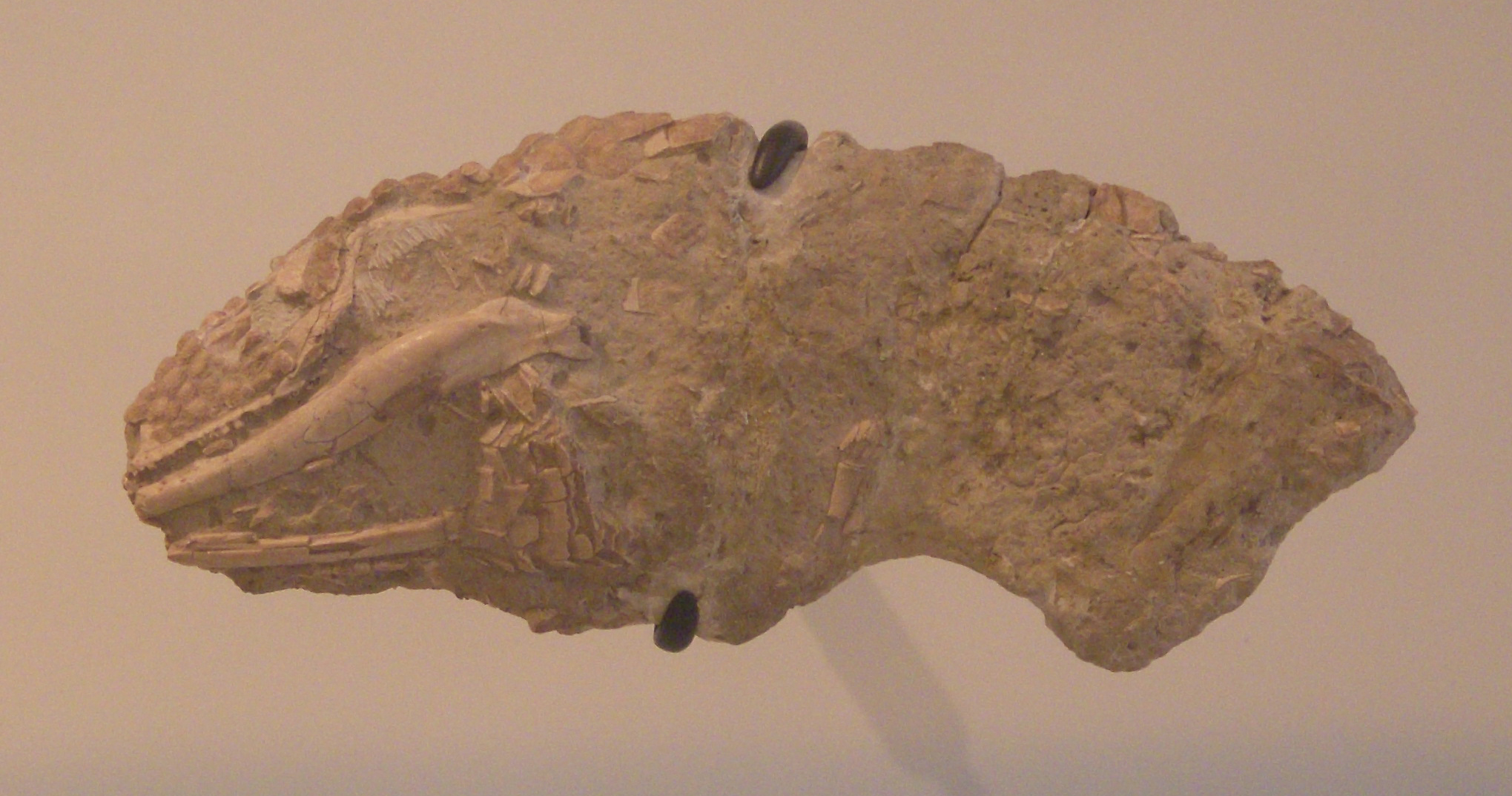
- Fossil of Helodermoides tuberculatus

Scientific classification
- Domain: Eukaryota
- Kingdom: Animalia
- Phylum: Chordata
- Class: Reptilia
- Order: Squamata
- Family: Anguidae
- Clade: †Glyptosaurini
- Genus: †Helodermoides; Douglass, 1903

Type species
- †Helodermoides tuberculatus Douglass, 1903

= Helodermoides =

Helodermoides Temporal range: Oligocene

Extinct genus of lizards

Helodermoides is an extinct genus of anguid lizards from the Oligocene of North America. The genus is monotypic, including only the species Helodermoides tuberculatus. Helodermoides belongs to an extinct subfamily of anguids called Glyptosaurinae. In addition to many fragmentary bones, several complete skeletons of Helodermoides are known. Like other glyptosaurines, Helodermoides was covered in small scale-like bones called osteoderms. The osteoderms covering its skull are hexagonal, tightly interlocking, raised, and rounded.

One fossil of Helodermoides preserves a fused mass of osteoderms at the tip of a shortened tail, thought to represent healing after the end of the tail fell off. The tail would not have been able to grow back because the osteoderms formed a thick bony cap preventing growth. The ability to lose a tail, called autotomy, is also present in living anguids.
