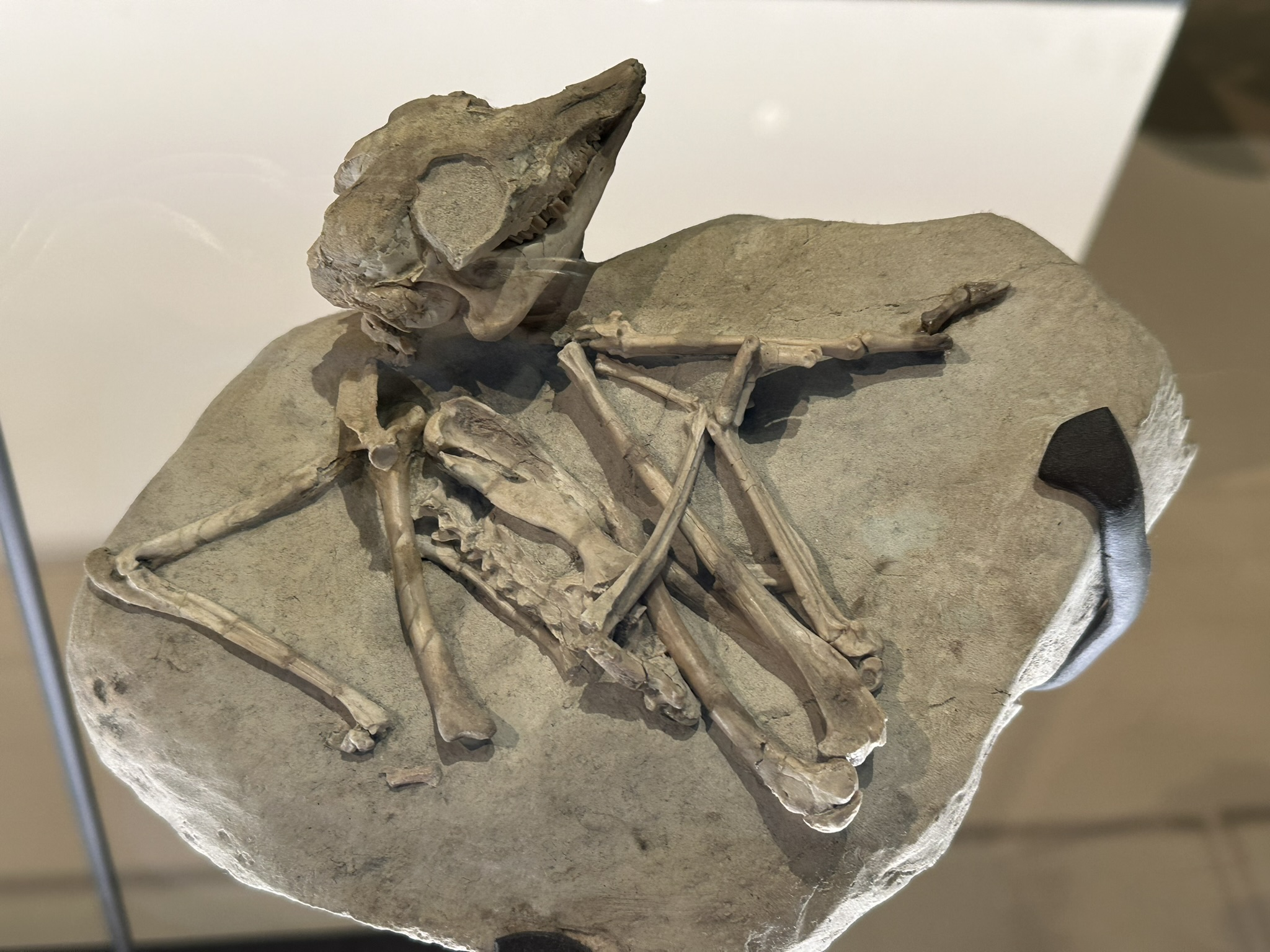
- Skeleton of Hypisodus sp., Perot Museum
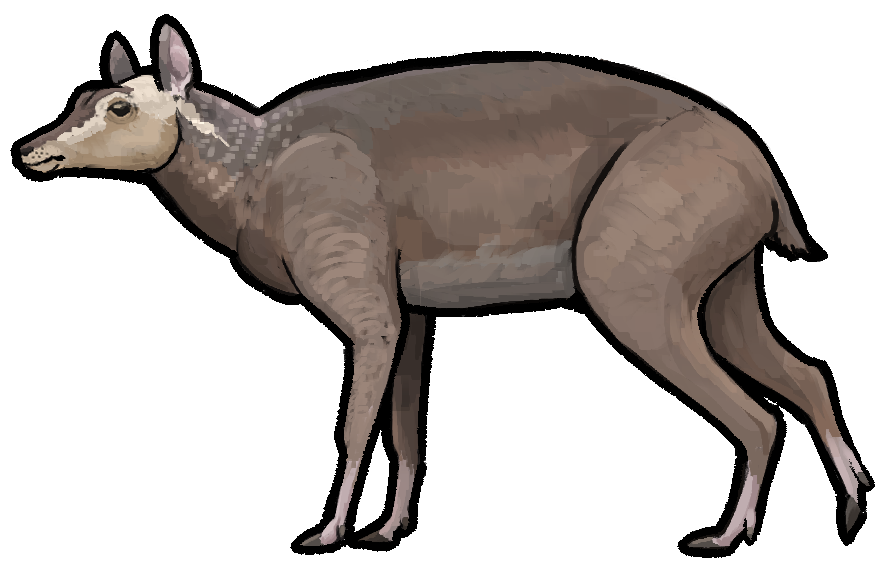
- Life restoration of H. minimus

Scientific classification
- Kingdom: Animalia
- Phylum: Chordata
- Class: Mammalia
- Order: Artiodactyla
- Family: †Hypertragulidae
- Genus: †Hypisodus; Cope (1873)

= Hypisodus =

Hypisodus Temporal range: Eocene–Oligocene

Extinct genus of mammals

Hypisodus is an extinct genus of hoofed mammal belonging to the family Hypertragulidae, within the order Artiodactyla, endemic to North America during the Eocene through Oligocene, living 37.2–26.3 Ma, existing for approximately 10.9 million years.

Hypisodus were primitive and ancient ruminants, resembling small deer or musk deer, although they were more closely related to modern chevrotains. Its diet was thought to be that of a frugivore, however it has been noted that its dentition and small body size supports the idea of requiring a highly selective browsing diet resembling other modern small artiodactyls.

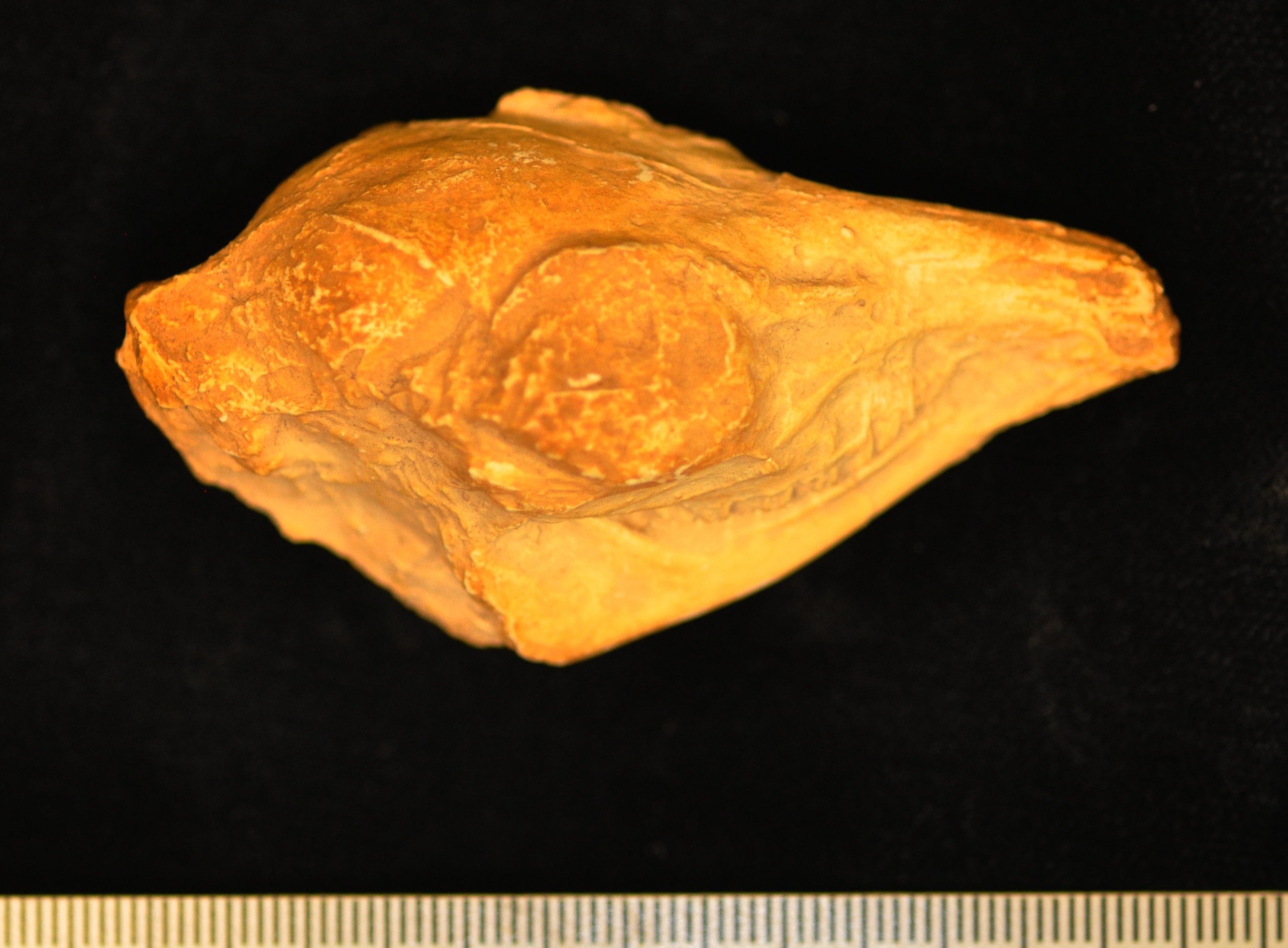
Skull of H. retallacki from the Oligocene (Orellan) Cedar Creek Formation in Horsetail Creek, Colorado.

== Taxonomy ==
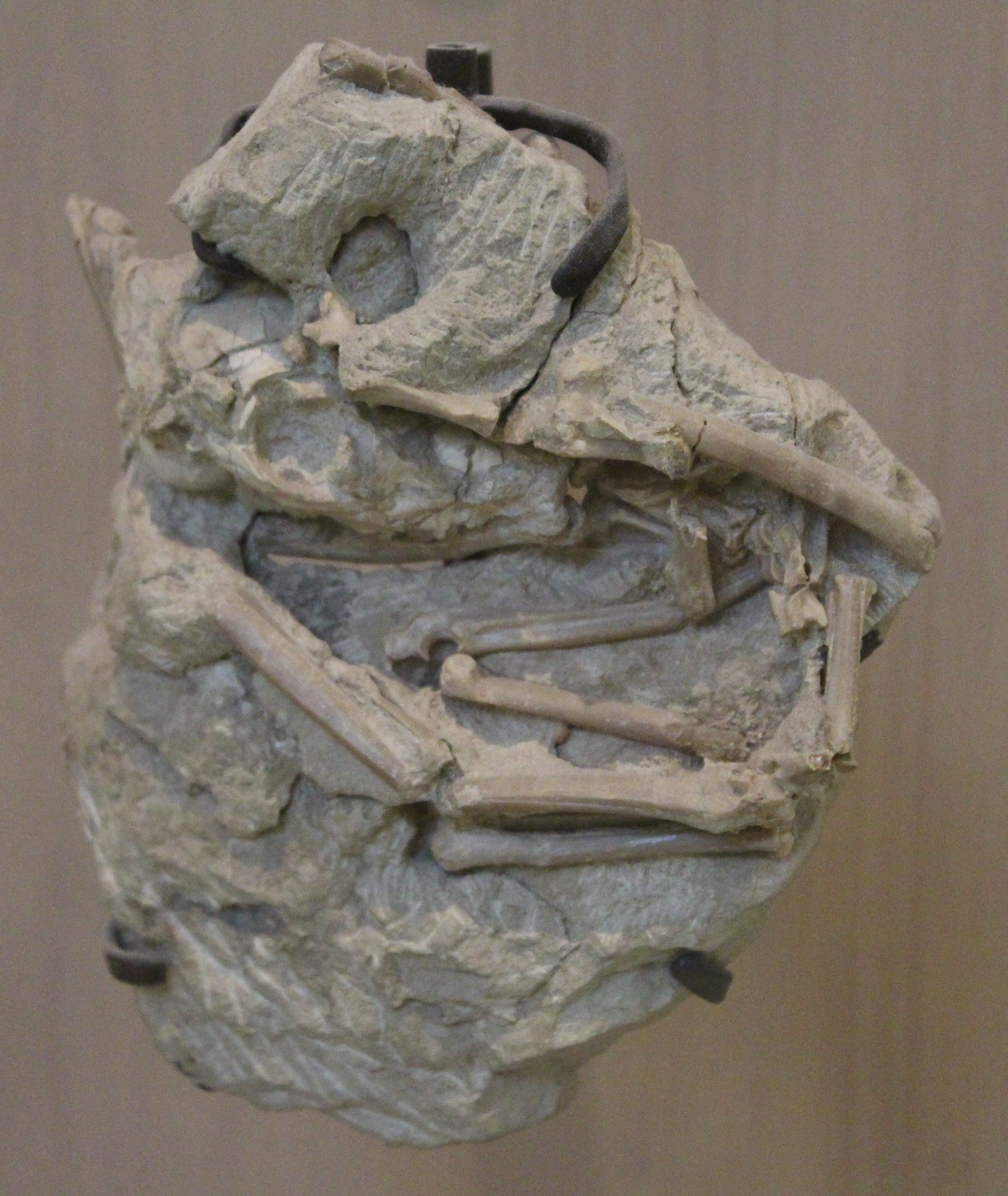
Hypisodus minimus skeleton, American Museum of Natural History

Hypisodus was named by Cope. It was assigned to Hypisodontinae by Matthew and to Hypertragulidae by Cope, Cook and Carroll.

== Fossil distribution ==
Partial list of fossil sites:

- 10 N Site, Gallatin County, Montana
- Horsetail Creek, Logan County, Colorado
