= Stenoplacosaurus =

Stenoplacosaurus Temporal range: Eocene

Scientific classification
- Domain: Eukaryota
- Kingdom: Animalia
- Phylum: Chordata
- Class: Reptilia
- Order: Squamata
- Family: Anguidae
- Subfamily: †Glyptosaurinae
- Genus: †Stenoplacosaurus; Sullivan and Dong, 2018

Type species
- †Helodermoides mongoliensis Sullivan, 1979

Extinct genus of lizards

Stenoplacosaurus is an extinct genus of glyptosaurine anguid lizards from the Eocene of Inner Mongolia, China. The genus is monotypic, containing only the species Stenoplacosaurus mongoliensis.

== Taxonomy ==
Stenoplacosaurus was originally named Helodermoides mongoliensis by Sullivan (1979) for remains found in the Shara Murun Formation of Inner Mongolia, China. In their redescription of Placosaurus, Sullivan and Auge (2006) transferred H. mongoliensis to Placosaurus, as P. mongoliensis. However, Sullivan and Dong (2018) found it to be generically distinct from the Placosaurus type species and renamed it Stenoplacosaurus.
