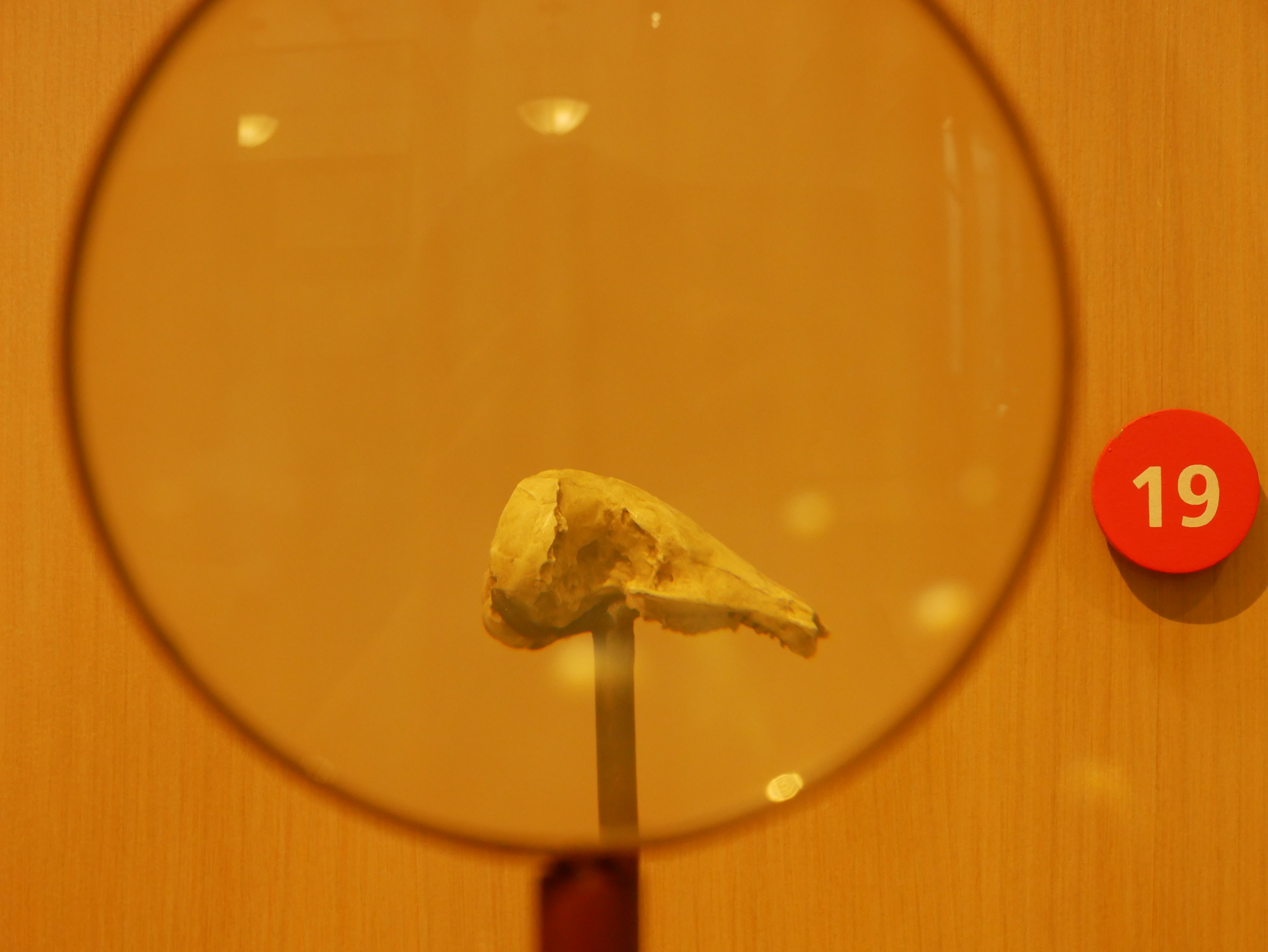

Scientific classification
- Kingdom: Animalia
- Phylum: Chordata
- Class: Mammalia
- Order: Lipotyphla
- Family: †Proscalopidae
- Genus: †Proscalops; Matthew, 1901

Species
- Proscalops evelynae; Proscalops intermedius; Proscalops miocaenus; Proscalops secundus; Proscalops tertius

= Proscalops =

Proscalops Temporal range: Early Oligocene through Early Miocene

Proscalops is an extinct genus of insect-eating mammal. Formerly placed in the defunct order Insectivora, it is now placed with the Eulipotyphla. The first and most numerous Proscalops fossils were found in the Sharps Formation of South Dakota, near Wounded Knee. Other samples have been found in the Brule Formation of South Dakota, the Deep River Formation of Montana, and in Wyoming.
