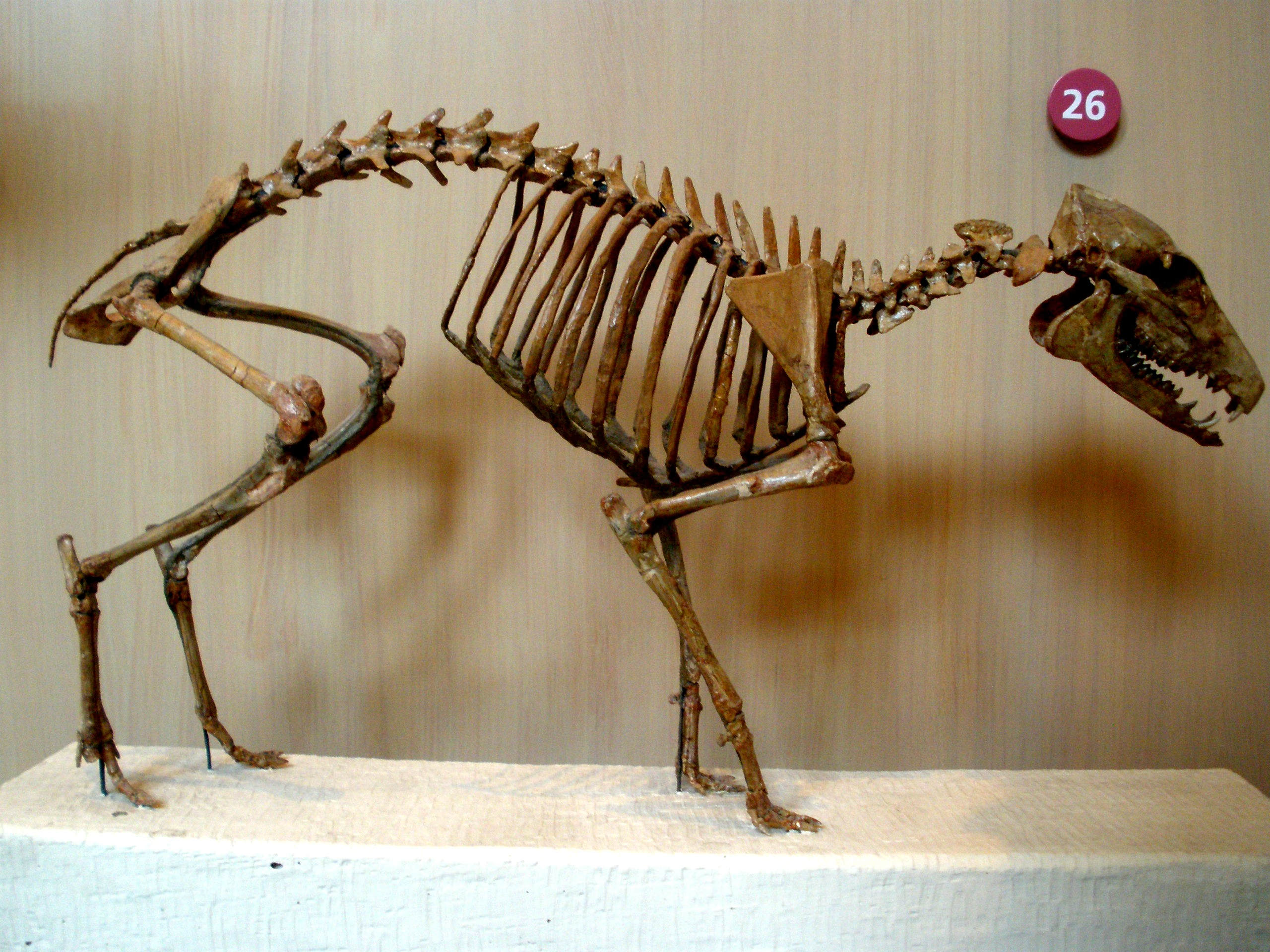
- Hypertragulus

Scientific classification
- Kingdom: Animalia
- Phylum: Chordata
- Class: Mammalia
- Order: Artiodactyla
- Suborder: Ruminantia
- Infraorder: Tragulina
- Family: †Hypertragulidae; Cope, 1879

Genera
- Hypertragulus; Hypisodus; Nanotragulus; Notomeryx; Parvitragulus; Simimeryx

= Hypertragulidae =

Hypertragulidae Temporal range: Late Eocene–Oligocene

Extinct family of mammals

Hypertragulidae is an extinct family of Paleogene ruminants endemic to North America from the Eocene until the Oligocene.

The Hypertragulidae are basal ruminants that resembled small deer or musk deer in life. However, neither deer, nor musk deer are considered to be closely related to the hypertragulids. Instead, the chevrotains are probably the closest living relatives to these ancient deer-like animals.

== Taxonomy ==
Hypertragulidae was named by Edward Drinker Cope and considered paraphyletic by W. D. Matthew. It was assigned to Ruminantia by Matthew and William King Gregory; to Pecora by H.J. Cook; and to Traguloidea by Carroll. Members of Protoceratidae, like Syndyoceras, have formerly been assigned to Hypertragulidae.

== Morphology ==
Hypertragulidae have tetradactyl front feet and didactyl rear feet, which is specific to this family and other early ruminants. They ranged in body mass from as small as 2.16 kg (4.8 lb) with Parvitragulus to as large as 4.24 kg (9.3 lb) in Hypisodus. Most members lack a cannon-bone, but the radius and the ulna are coössified. The canines of most Hypertragulids are enlarged and tusk-like to some degree.
