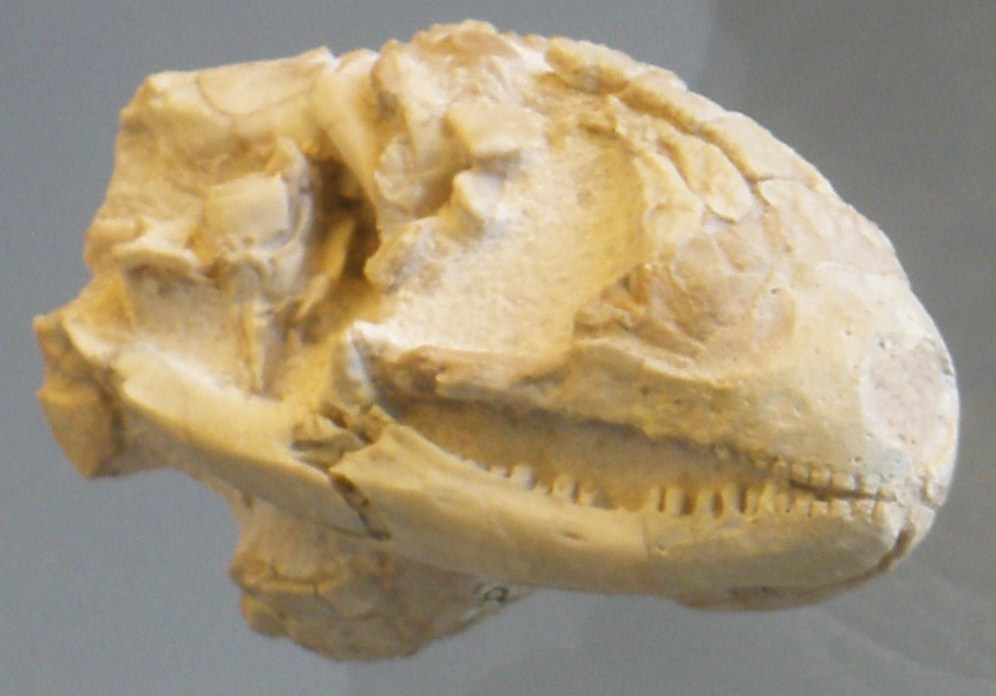
- Skull of Peltosaurus

Scientific classification
- Kingdom: Animalia
- Phylum: Chordata
- Class: Reptilia
- Order: Squamata
- Suborder: Anguimorpha
- Family: Anguidae
- Subfamily: †Glyptosaurinae
- Genus: †Peltosaurus; Cope, 1873

Species
- †P. granulosus Cope, 1873 (type); †P. macrodon Brattstrom, 1955

= Peltosaurus =

Peltosaurus Temporal range: Eocene - Miocene

Extinct genus of lizards

Peltosaurus is an extinct genus of anguid lizard from North America that lived from the Eocene to the Miocene. Peltosaurus belongs to the anguid subfamily Glyptosaurinae. The type species Peltosaurus granulosus was named in 1873 by American paleontologist Edward Drinker Cope. Many additional species have been named, but most have been reassigned to different genera. For example, Peltosaurus piger, named in 1928, was reclassified as Odaxosaurus piger, and P. jepseni, named in 1942 from the Paleocene of Wyoming, but was later reclassified as Proxestops jepseni. In 1955 a new species, Peltosaurus macrodon, was named from the Eocene of California. Lizard bones from the Late Miocene of Nebraska were attributed to a new species of Peltosaurus called P. minimus in 1976, extending the fossil range of Peltosaurus and Glyptosaurinae into the Neogene. However, these bones were later referred to a genus of skinks called Eumeces, meaning that the fossil range of Peltosaurus and Glyptosaurinae does not go beyond the Paleogene.

The name Peltosaurus was going to be used for the dinosaur now named Sauropelta, but when it was realized that the name was preoccupied, Sauropelta was substituted.
