= Sharps Corner, South Dakota =

Unincorporated community in the United States

Coordinates: 43°23′23″N 102°23′55″W

Sharps Corner is an unincorporated community in Oglala Lakota County, South Dakota, United States. The locale is contained within the Pine Ridge Indian Reservation and is situated at the juncture of BIA Highway 27 and BIA 2. Sharps Corner was named for Grover Sharp, who built a grocery store in the area in the 1940s. This store was bought out in 2000, and continues to operate under the name Common Cents Store as of 2022.

The community is noteworthy as the eponym of the geologic formation Sharps Formation.
