= Odaxosaurus =

Odaxosaurus Temporal range: Late Cretaceous – Paleocene, 85–55 Ma

Scientific classification
- Domain: Eukaryota
- Kingdom: Animalia
- Phylum: Chordata
- Class: Reptilia
- Order: Squamata
- Family: Anguidae
- Genus: †Odaxosaurus; Gilmore, 1928

Species
- †O. piger Gilmore, 1928 (type) †O. priscus Gao and Fox, 1996

Extinct genus of lizards

Odaxosaurus is an extinct genus of anguid lizards that existed in western North America from the Late Cretaceous to the Paleocene. Fossils of the type species Odaxosaurus piger and the species O. priscus are widespread throughout Late Cretaceous formations in the western United States and Canada. First described in 1928 from the Lance Formation in Wyoming, O. piger has since been found in the Hell Creek Formation in Wyoming and Montana, the Frenchman and Scollard formations in Alberta, and the Aguja Formation in Texas. It was one of the few species of lizards to survive the Cretaceous–Paleogene extinction event, which is estimated to have killed off 83% of all lizard species. The second species, O. priscus, was named in 1996 from the Dinosaur Park Formation in Alberta and has since been found in the Kaiparowits Formation in southern Utah. Remains of an anguid from the Kirtland Formation in New Mexico may also belong to Odaxosaurus.
