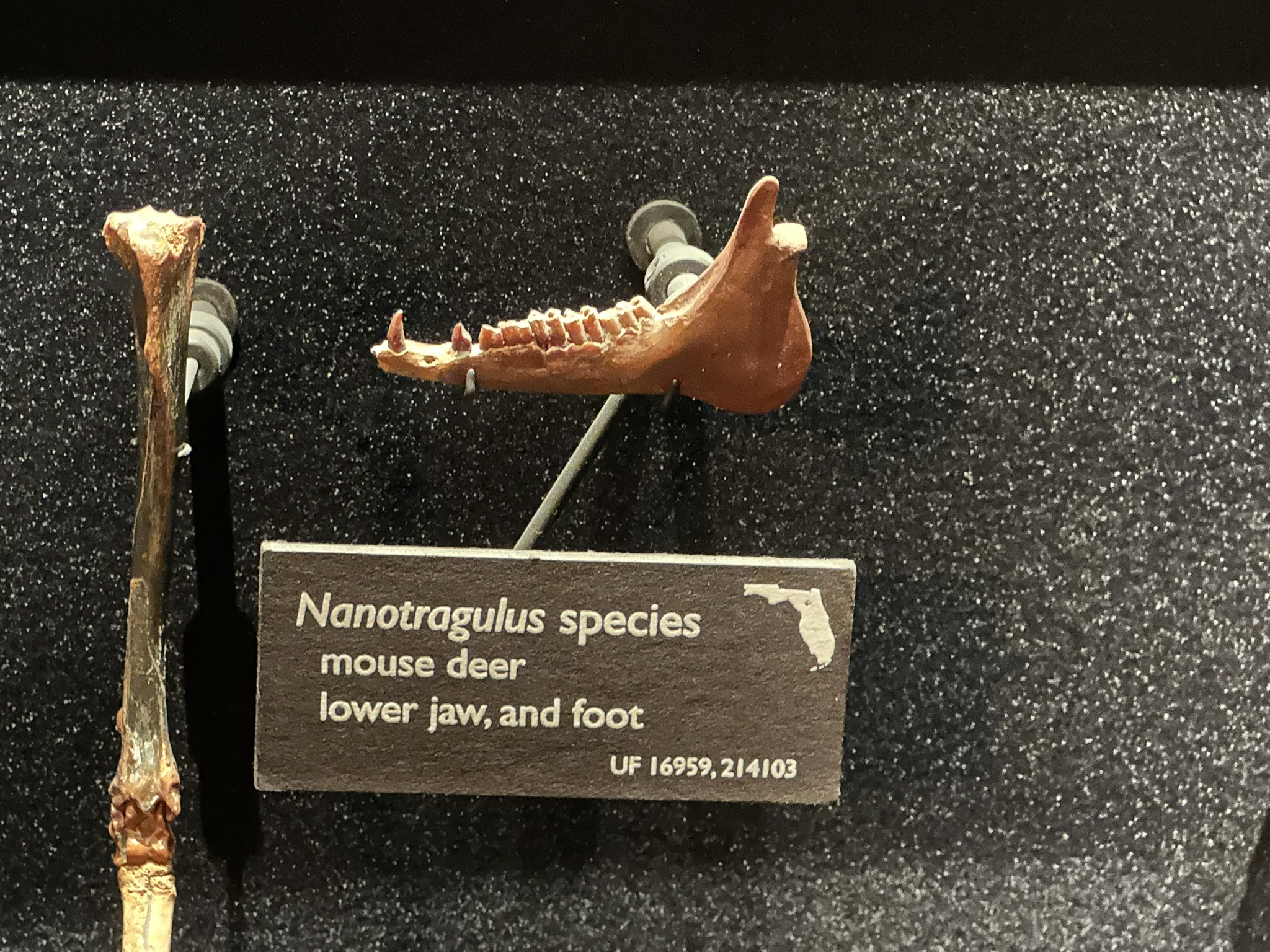
- Fossil jaw and foot, Florida Museum of Natural History

Scientific classification
- Kingdom: Animalia
- Phylum: Chordata
- Class: Mammalia
- Order: Artiodactyla
- Family: †Hypertragulidae
- Genus: †Nanotragulus; Lull 1922
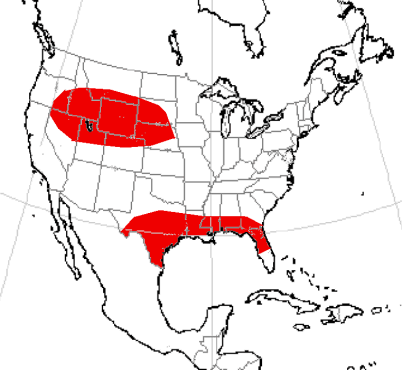
- Range of Nanotragulus based on fossil record

= Nanotragulus =

Nanotragulus Temporal range: Middle Eocene–Early Miocene

Extinct genus of mammals

Nanotragulus is an extinct genus of hypertragulid ruminant found in North America. It lived from the Middle Eocene to the Early Miocene, living 46.2–20.4 Ma, existing for approximately 26 million years. Fossils have been found from Oregon and Montana to Florida.

Nanotragulus was a primitive and ancient ruminant, resembling small deer or musk deer, although more closely related to the modern chevrotain. Its diet is stated to be that of a frugivore.
