= Parictis =

Parictis Temporal range: Eocene–Miocene

Scientific classification
- Kingdom: Animalia
- Phylum: Chordata
- Class: Mammalia
- Order: Carnivora
- Family: †Subparictidae
- Genus: †Parictis; Scott, 1893

Type species
- †Parictis primaevus

Species
- †Parictis major; †Parictis personi

Extinct genus of carnivoran

Parictis is an extinct arctoid belonging to the family Subparictidae.

== Taxonomy & evolution ==
It was originally described as a new genus and species Parietis princeous of mustelid by Scott in 1893, for a single specimen, a mandible fragment with two anterior molars. An alternative name and spelling, ?Parictis princeps, was proposed in 1894; and in 1904 both the genus and species name were declared to be in error and the name Parictis primaevus was assigned.

Parictis bathygenus was described in 1947, but it was considered a different genus by 1958, and a synonym of Cynelos caroniavorus by 1976.

Another species was described in 1954 as Campylocynodon personi, and was reassigned to the genus Parictis in 1967. And Parictis major was described during a review of the genus in 1972.

The genus as a whole was placed within various families, including Canidae by Hall in 1931 and Ursidae by Hunt in 1998. It is placed within the family Subparictidae as of 2023.

== Description ==
It was a very small and graceful arctoid with a skull only 7 cm long. Parictis first appeared in North America in the Late Eocene (around 38 million years ago), but it did not arrive in Eurasia until the Miocene. Some suggest that Parictis may have emigrated from Asia into North America during the major sea level low about 37 mya, because of the continued evolution of the Amphicynodontinae into the Hemicyoninae in Asia. Although no Parictis fossils have been found in East Asia, Parictis does appear in Eurasia and Africa, but not until the Miocene.
