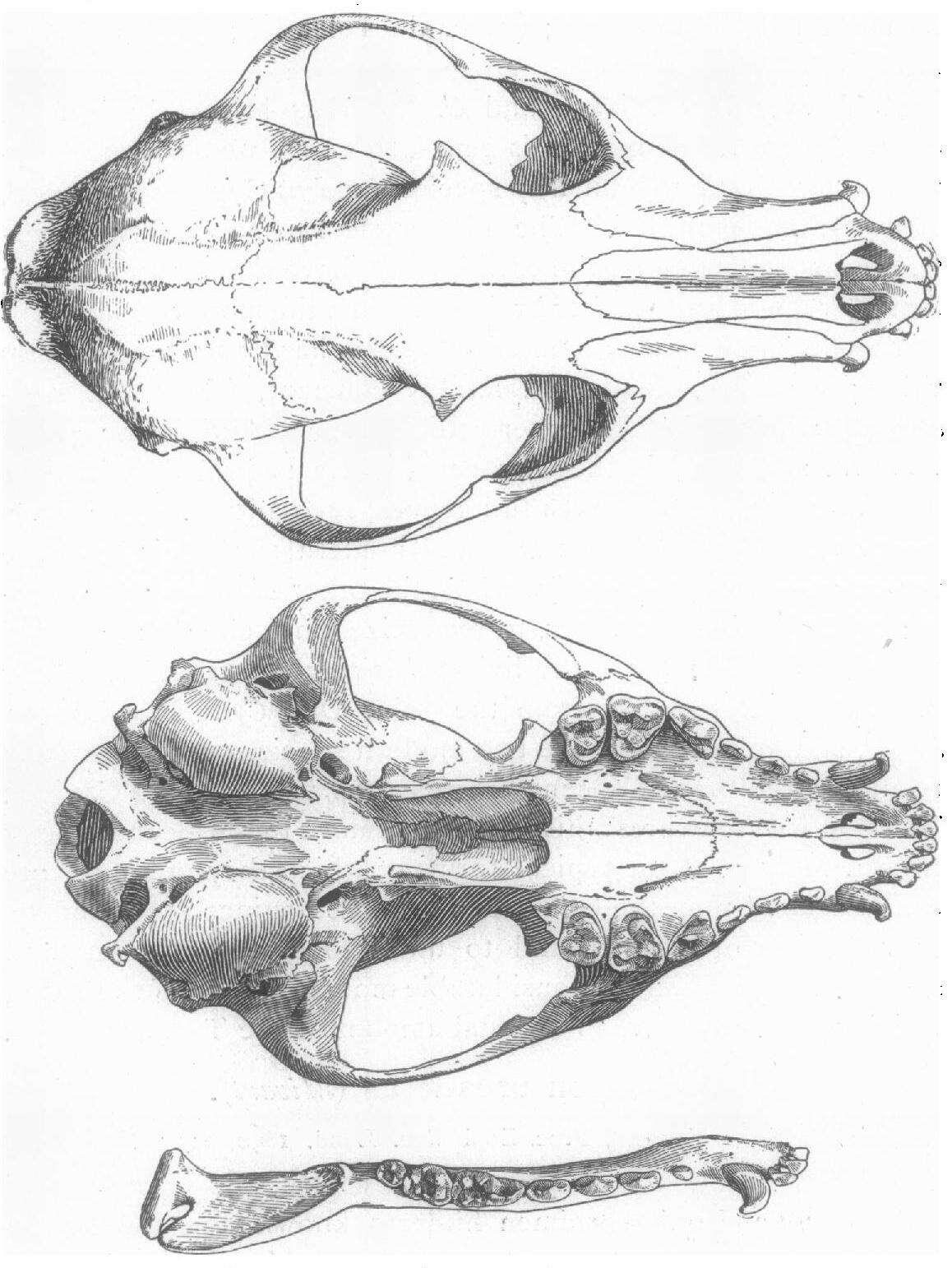

Scientific classification
- Kingdom: Animalia
- Phylum: Chordata
- Class: Mammalia
- Order: Carnivora
- Family: †Subparictidae
- Genus: †Nothocyon; Wortman & Matthew, 1899
- Species: †N. geismarianus

Binomial name
- †Nothocyon geismarianus (Cope, 1878)

Synonyms
- Canis geismarianus; Galecynus geismarianus

= Nothocyon =

Nothocyon Temporal range: late Oligocene

Extinct genus of carnivores

Nothocyon ("spurious dog") is an extinct genus of carnivoran in the family Subparictidae which inhabited North America during the late Oligocene. At one time, many species of the dog family Canidae were placed in Nothocyon, but new fossils showed that the type species of Nothocyon, N. geismarianus, is more closely related to bears. The other species have been reassigned to other genera such as Cormocyon.

== Taxonomy and evolution ==
The species Canis geismarianus was originally described by Edward Drinker Cope in 1878, based on a jaw fragment with a single m1 that came from the John Day Formation in Oregon. The specific epithet geismarianus was given in honor of the naturalist Jacob Geismar. He assigned further material to the species and reassigned it to the genus Galecynus in 1881, and described yet more material in 1883, which became the focus in studies on the species. In 1884, Cope re-illustrated most of the material assigned to N. geismarianus and established the original material described, AMNH 6884, as the holotype, though he did not illustrate it. He later reassigned the species once again, this time to the genus Cynodictis.

It was considered a borophagine canid and was assigned to a new genus Nothocyon by Wortman and Matthew in 1899, along with two other small canid species from the John Day Formation (N. latidens and N. lemur, which had both been previously assigned to the genera Galecynus and then Cynodictis) and two living species from South America (N. urostictus and N. parvidens, both formerly assigned to the genus Canis, and now considered synonyms of Lycalopex vetulus). Yet another species, Nothocyon regulus, was described in 1962.

However, in 1992, a thorough re-description of the holotype was published by Wang & Tedford, who matched it with associated upper and lower teeth from the same locality, and re-assigned the 1881 and 1883 canid material to the species Cormocyon copei, and placing Nothocyon geismarianus as a stem arctoid. A further study in 1999 reassigned Nothocyon lemur and N. roii to Cynarctoides, N. latidens and N. annectens to Phlaocyon, N. regulus as a synonym of Desmocyon thomsoni. Another two species assigned at one time to Nothocyon, "N." gregorii and "N." vulpinus, and the variant N. geismarianus var mollis, have been reassigned to the genus Leptocyon.

The genus Nothocyon was assigned to the family Subparictidae in 2023.

== Paleobiology ==
N. geismarianus is known from localities dating back to the Late Arikareean and possibly the early Hemingfordian of Oregon.
