= Harrison Formation =

Geologic group in South Dakota and Nebraska, United States

- Stratigraphic range: Miocene
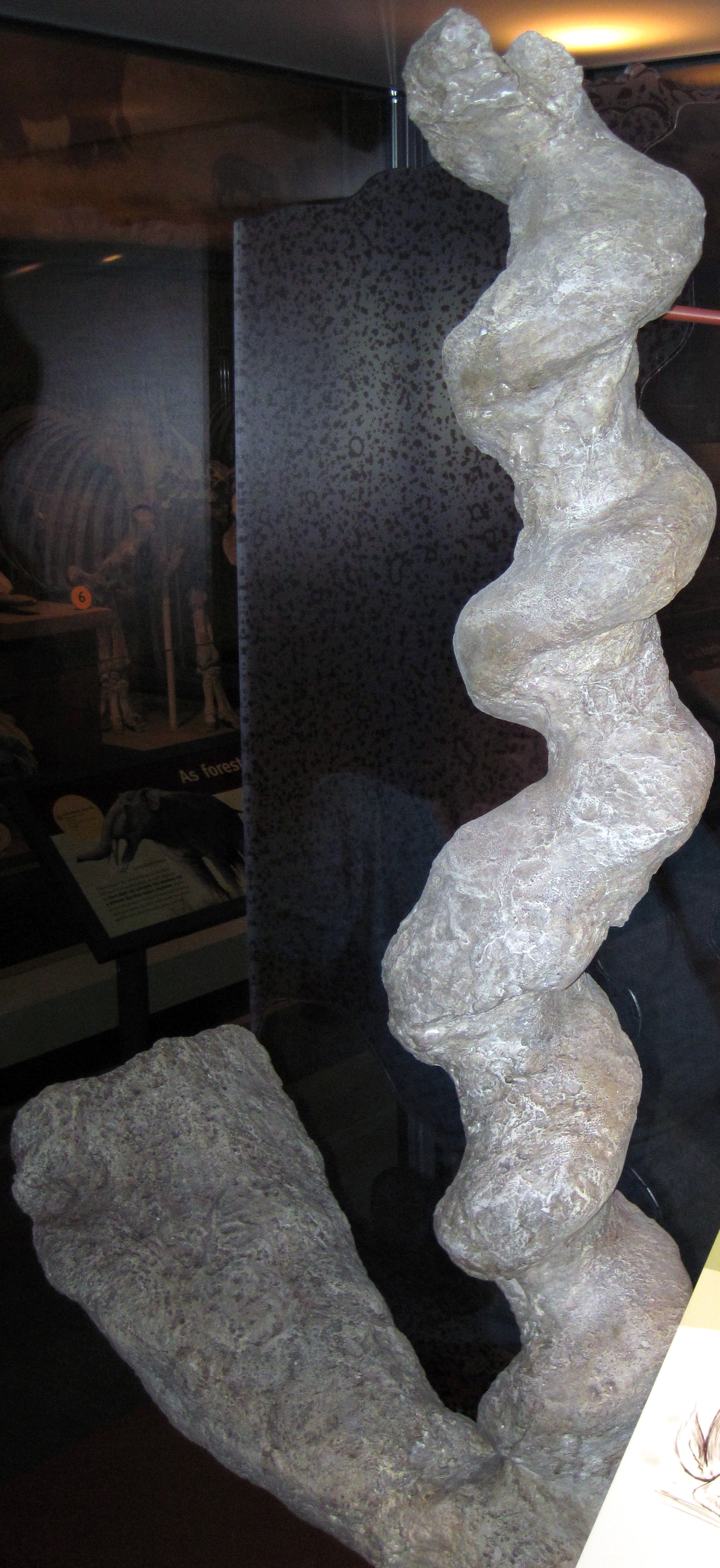
- Burrow fossil from the Harrison Formation (Middle Miocene; Sioux County, Nebraska)
- Type: Formation

Location
- Region: South Dakota, Wyoming, Nebraska
- Country: United States

The Harrison Formation is a geologic group in South Dakota and Nebraska. It preserves fossils from the Miocene.

== See also ==
- List of fossiliferous stratigraphic units in South Dakota
- Paleontology in South Dakota
