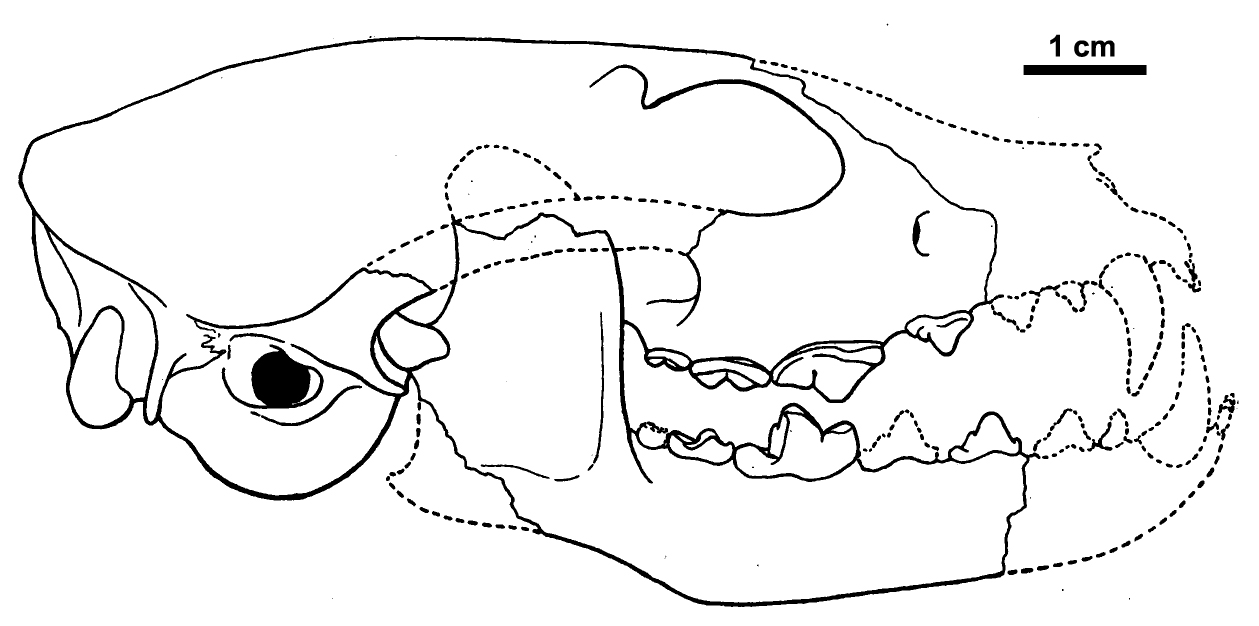
- Drawing of the holotype skull of Leptocyon gregorii
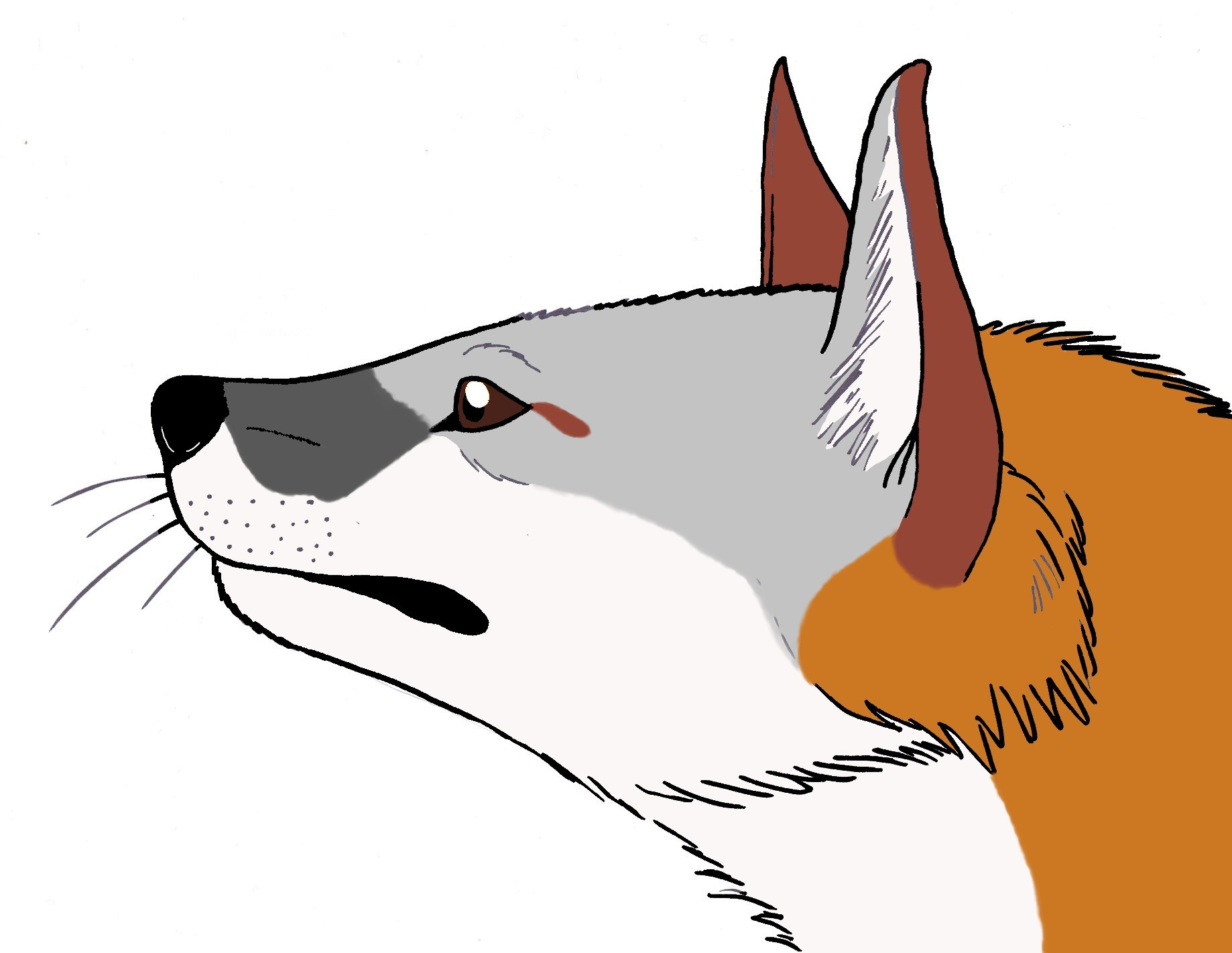

Scientific classification
- Kingdom: Animalia
- Phylum: Chordata
- Class: Mammalia
- Order: Carnivora
- Family: Canidae
- Subfamily: Caninae
- Genus: †Leptocyon; Matthew, 1918

Species
- †L. delicatus Loomis 1932; †L. gregorii Matthew 1907; †L. vafer Leidy 1858; †L. vulpinus Matthew 1907
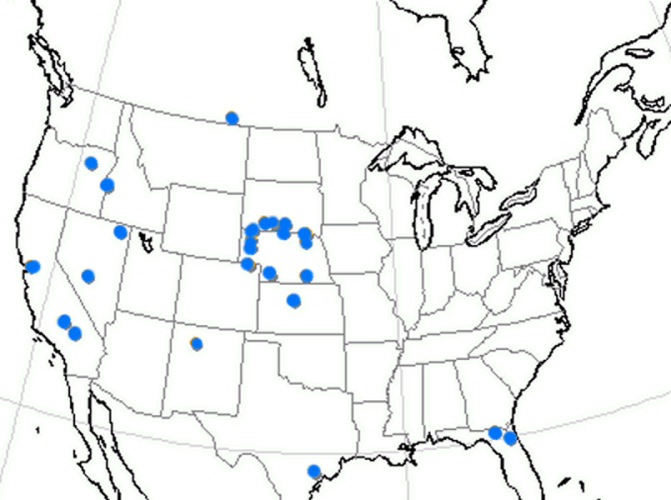
- Fossil range of Leptocyon species

Synonyms
- Neocynodesmus Macdonald 1963

= Leptocyon =

Leptocyon Temporal range: Oligocene-Miocene (Whitneyan-Clarendonian) ~30.8–10.3 Ma

Extinct genus of carnivores

The genus Leptocyon (Greek: leptos slender + cyon dog) includes 11 species and is the oldest known canine. They were small and weighed around 2 kilograms (4.4 lb). They first appeared in North America around 34 million years ago in the Oligocene, at the same time as the Borophaginae, with whom they share features, indicating that these were two sister groups. Borophaginae skull and dentition were designed for a powerful killing bite compared with the Leptocyon which were designed for snatching small, fast-moving prey. The species L. delicatus is the smallest canid to have existed. At the close of their genus 9 million years ago one Leptocyon lineage resembled the modern fox.

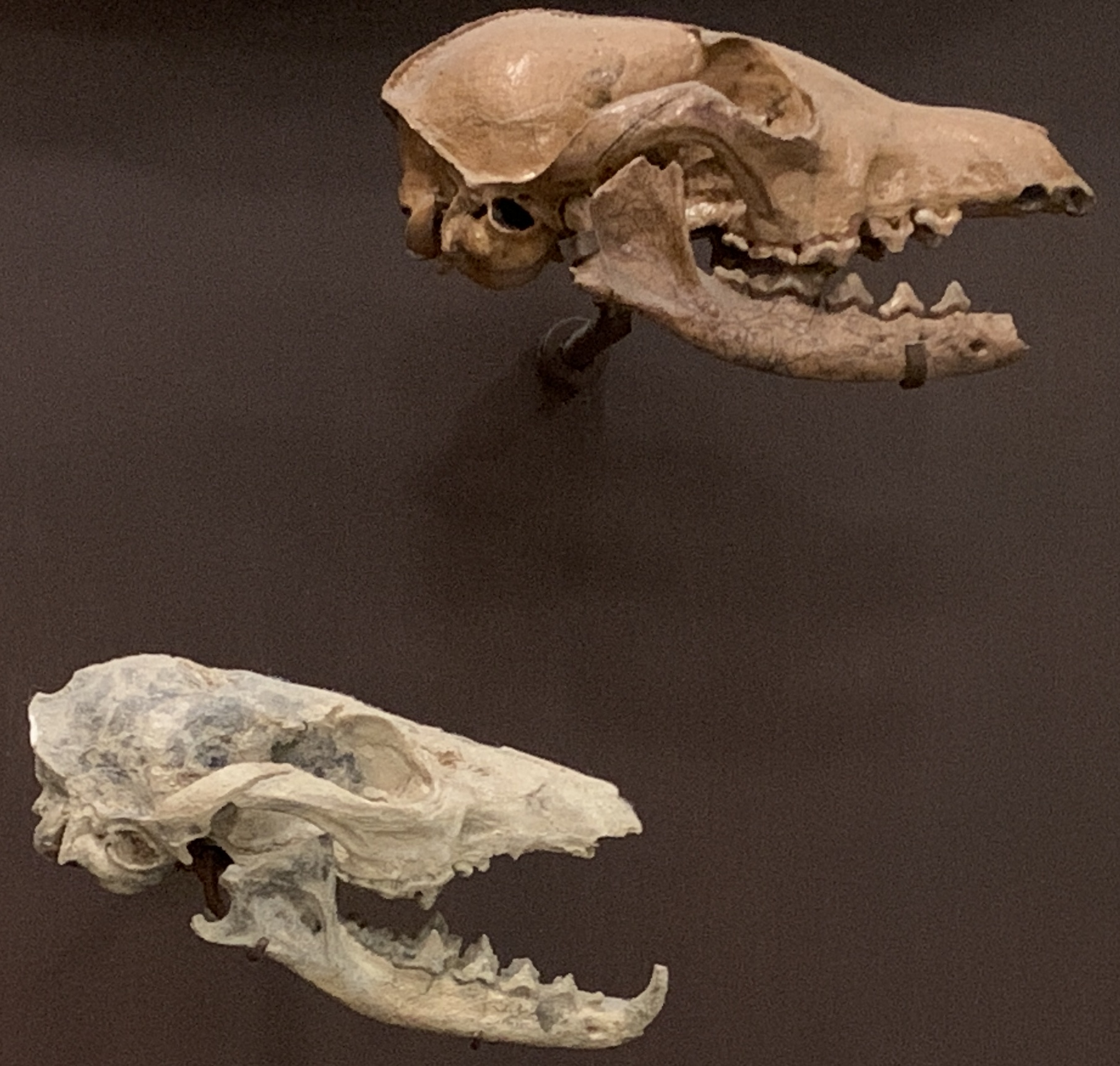
L. vafer skull cast (bottom) of a specimen from California, compared to a red fox skull (top). At the AMNH.

Leptocyon were small-bodied, fox-like animals with a long, narrow jaw and delicate teeth. They were probably omnivorous, feeding on small animals and fruit in a diet that remained relatively unchanged during the Miocene.

== Bibliography ==
- Wang, Xiaoming; Tedford, Richard H. (2008). Dogs:Their Fossil Relatives and Evolutionary History. Columbia University Press, New York. ISBN 978-0-231-13529-0.
