= 2023 in paleomammalogy =

This article records new taxa of fossil mammals of every kind described during the year 2023, as well as other significant discoveries and events related to paleontology of mammals which occurred in 2023.

== Afrotherians ==
=== Proboscideans ===
Name	Novelty	Status	Authors	Age	Type locality	Country	Notes	Images
Stenobelodon	Gen. et comb. nov	Disputed	Lambert	Miocene		United States (Florida)	A new genus for "Amebelodon" floridanus (Leidy, 1886). Its validity as a distinct genus was contested by Jukar, Millhouse & Carrano (2025) and reaffirmed by Lambert (2025).	

==== Proboscidean research ====
- Review of the systematics and evolutionary history of African proboscideans is published by Sanders (2023).
- A study on the evolution of teeth of proboscideans from East Africa over the past 26 million years is published by Saarinen & Lister (2023), who find evidence of ratchet-like mode of evolution, with periods of rapid increase in hypsodonty and loph count (probably related to episodes of increase of aridity) alternating with longer periods of relative stasis rather than reversal of these traits.
- Choudhary et al. (2023) report the first discovery of the fossil material of a mammutid (cf. Zygolophodon) from the Upper Miocene deposits of Tapar (Kutch, India), extending known temporal range of mammutids in the southern Himalayan foreland basin to ~10 million years ago.
- Fossil material of a mammutid distinct from the more basal Zygolophodon and possibly belonging to the species "Mammut" obliquelophus is described from the Upper Miocene locality of Sazak (Turkey) by Konidaris et al. (2023), representing the first record of "Mammut" in the Upper Miocene of western Asia reported to date, and interpreted by the authors as supporting the existence of a zoogeographic link enabling proboscidean interchanges between Europe and East Asia during the Late Miocene.
- Von Koenigswald, Widga & Göhlich (2023) describe fossil material of mammutids from Oregon (partial skull of Zygolophodon proavus from the Clarendonian Ironside Formation, a maxilla of a mammutid of uncertain affinities – tentatively classified as "Mammut furlongi" – from the Clarendonian Juntura Formation, and partial skull of Mammut matthewi from the Hemphillian Dalles Formation), and interpret the Miocene and Pliocene record of North American mammutid as indicating that Mammut most likely did not immigrate into North America from Eurasia but rather evolved from Zygolophodon in North America.
- Li, Chen & Wang (2023) reinterpret "Trilophodon" connexus as a member of the family Choerolophodontidae, and provisionally assign it to the genus Choerolophodon.
- Revision of the gomphothere faunas of the Miocene Linxia Basin (China) is published by Wang et al. (2023), who report the presence of three fossil assemblages of different age.
- A study on the morphology and feeding ecology of longirostrine gomphotheres from the Early–Middle Miocene of northern China is published by Li et al. (2023), who interpret Platybelodon as the first known proboscidean that evolved both grazing behavior and trunk coiling and grasping functions, making it better adapted to the open environment than other longirostrine taxa, and interpret these adaptations as eventually resulting in the feeding function shifting from the mandibular symphysis and tusks to the trunk.
- Neves et al. (2023) study carbon and oxygen isotopic signatures from samples of dentin of a specimen of Notiomastodon platensis from the Sousa municipality (Brazil) living during the Last Glacial Maximum, and interpret their findings as indicating that the studied specimen lived in a wetter environment compared to other localities from the Brazilian Intertropical Region and had mixed-feeder diet.
- Konidaris et al. (2023) describe fossil material of Deinotherium levius and Tetralophodon longirostris from the Hammerschmiede clay pit (Germany), report evidence of their feeding habits indicative of niche partitioning between the two species which made their coexistence at Hammerschmiede possible, and interpret their presence at the site (coupled with the absence of Gomphotherium at Hammerschmiede to date) as documenting the transition from the Middle Miocene trilophodont (Gomphotherium)-dominated proboscidean faunas of central Europe to the Late Miocene tetralophodont-dominated ones.
- Romano et al. (2023) estimate the body mass of Anancus arvernensis to be between 5.2 and 6 tonnes.
- Lin et al. (2023) recover complete mitogenome from a molar of a member of the genus Palaeoloxodon and partial mitochondrial sequences from another member of this genus (both from the Pleistocene of China), and interpret the studied specimens as possible representatives of a population with a large spatial span across Eurasia.
- A study on woolly mammoth genomes, identifying genetic variants associated with hair and skin development, fat storage and metabolism, and immune system function that had become fixed in the woolly mammoth lineage, is published by Díez-del-Molino et al. (2023).
- A study on the accumulation of woolly mammoth bones from the Upper Paleolithic site Kostenki 14 (Markina Gora, Voronezh Oblast, Russia), aiming to assess relations between the body size of Kostenki mammoths, the state of their population and the timeframe of bone assemblage accumulation, is published by Petrova et al. (2023), who interpret their findings as indicative of relatively long-term inhabitation of the studied area by mammoths and permanent visitation of the site.
- Evidence from tooth enamel of a woolly mammoth from the Upper Paleolithic Kraków Spadzista site (Poland), interpreted as indicating that the studied mammoth grazed in southern Poland in winter time and likely moved 250–400 km northwards during summer throughout at least 12–13 years of its adult life, is presented by Kowalik et al. (2023).
- Cherney et al. (2023) study steroid hormone concentrations in woolly mammoth tusk dentin, and report evidence periodic increases in testosterone, interpreted as indicating that male mammoths experienced episodes of musth similar to those occurring in extant African elephants.
- Larramendi (2023) provides a formula for estimating tusk weight in proboscideans and conducts a review of tusk size evolution in Proboscidea.

=== Sirenians ===
==== Sirenian research ====
- Evidence of adaptation of motor-sensorial systems which were originally associated with tooth innervation to innervation of novel keratinized structures in sirenians, based on data from the study of extant and extinct sirenians, is presented by Hautier et al. (2023).
- Probable new specimen of Prototherium ausetanum, complementing the available information of the anatomy of that species, is described from the Eocene (Bartonian) limestone south of Sant Vicenç de Castellet (Catalonia, Spain) by Voss et al. (2023).

=== Other afrotherians ===
Name	Novelty	Status	Authors	Age	Type locality	Country	Notes	Images
Hadrogeneios	Gen. et sp. nov		Gheerbrant	Paleocene	Ouled Abdoun Basin	Morocco	A basal member of Paenungulatomorpha. The type species is H. phosphaticus.	

==== Miscellaneous afrotherian research ====
- A study on teeth and affinities of Qarunavus meyeri is published by Kampouridis et al. (2023), who place Qarunavus in the family Ptolemaiidae, and interpret the eruption sequence of the permanent teeth of Qarunavus as potentially supporting the placement of Ptolemaiida within Afrotheria.
- Lihoreau et al. (2023) describe a tooth of an embrithopod belonging to the genus Palaeoamasia from the Eocene Lopar Sandstone (Croatia), extending known geographic range of members of this genus, and interpret this finding as consistent with the existence of the isolated Balkanatolian landmass which was isolated from Western Europe prior to the Grande Coupure.

== Euarchontoglires ==
=== Primates ===
Name	Novelty	Status	Authors	Age	Type locality	Country	Notes	Images
Anadoluvius	Gen. et comb. nov	Valid	Sevim-Erol et al.	Miocene		Turkey	An ape belonging to the subfamily Homininae. The type species is "Ouranopithecus" turkae Güleç et al. (2007).	
Ashaninkacebus	Gen. et sp. nov		Marivaux et al.	Paleogene-Neogene		Brazil	Probably a member of the family Eosimiidae. The type species is A. simpsoni.	
Mytonius williamsae	Sp. nov		Kirk et al.	Eocene	Tornillo Basin	United States (Texas)	A member of the family Omomyidae.	
Ourayia coverti	Sp. nov		Kirk et al.	Eocene	Tornillo Basin	United States (Texas)	A member of the family Omomyidae.	
Palaeohodites	Gen. et sp. nov		Rust et al.	Eocene	Nadu Formation	China	A member of Adapiformes belonging to the family Ekgmowechashalidae. The type species is P. naduensis.	
Saskomomys	Gen. et sp. nov	Valid	Perry, Dutchak & Theodor	Eocene (Uintan)	Cypress Hills Formation	Canada (Saskatchewan)	A member of the family Omomyidae belonging to the subfamily Omomyinae. The type species is S. lindsayorum.	
Sungulusimias	Gen. et sp. nov	Valid	Métais et al.	Eocene		Turkey	A member of the family Eosimiidae. The type species is S. unayae.	
Theropithecus oswaldi ecki	Ssp. nov		Getahun, Delson & Seyoum	Pliocene	Hadar Formation	Ethiopia	A member of Papionini.	
Trogolemur storeri	Sp. nov	Valid	Perry, Dutchak & Theodor	Eocene (Uintan)	Cypress Hills Formation	Canada (Saskatchewan)	A member of the family Omomyidae belonging to the subfamily Anaptomorphinae.	

==== Primate research ====
- Evidence from the navicular morphology, interpreted as indicating that early euprimates displayed a diverse array of locomotor adaptations early on their evolution, is presented by Monclús-Gonzalo et al. (2023).
- A study on the phylogeny and evolution of notharctines known from Wyoming is published by Gingerich (2023), who considers changes of the notharctine diversity to be related to Eocene climate changes.
- A study on evolutionary changes to temporal lobe size relative to brain size in fossil Old World monkeys is published by Pearson & Polly (2023), who interpret their finding as indicative of several cerebral reorganisations in the evolutionary history of the Old World monkeys, with the most noticeable change coinciding with environmental changes in the Late Eocene and Early Oligocene.
- A study on tooth chipping patterns in Aegyptopithecus zeuxis, Apidium phiomense, Catopithecus browni, Parapithecus grangeri, Propliopithecus ankeli and Propliopithecus chirobates from the Fayum Depression (Egypt) is published by Towle, Borths & Loch (2023), who interpret their findings as indicative of a predominantly soft fruit diet of the studied primates.
- Pickford, Gommery & Ingicco (2023) describe a probable Early Pliocene macaque molar from the Red Crag Formation (United Kingdom), representing one of the oldest and northernmost records of the genus in Europe reported to date.
- A study on tooth microwear in Macaca majori is published by Plastiras et al. (2023), who interpret their findings as indicating that M. majori likely fed on harder foods and occupied a different dietary niche compared to its mainland fossil relatives.
- Proffitt et al. (2023) report that, while cracking nuts, extant crab-eating macaques unintentionally produce flakes that fall within the technological range of artifacts made by early hominins, and caution that such flakes may be misidentified as intentional products if found in Plio-Pleistocene sites.
- Post et al. (2023) recommend the use of Victoriapithecus and Ekembo as more suitable outgroups in the studies of the phylogenetic relationships of apes (including fossil hominins) than members of the genera Papio and Colobus.
- Kikuchi (2023) attempts to determine the body mass of Nacholapithecus kerioi, and considers it to be an arboreal primate.
- Review of the Miocene ape systematics is published by Urciuoli & Alba (2023), who discuss the problems affecting the studies of phylogenetic relationships and evolutionary history of Miocene apes.
- Evidence from the Moroto II site (Uganda), indicating that Miocene apes from Moroto II (including Morotopithecus) shared locomotor traits with living apes and lived in seasonally dry woodlands with abundant C_{4} grasses, is presented by MacLatchy et al. (2023).
- Pugh et al. (2023) reconstruct the face of Pierolapithecus catalaunicus, and interpret its morphology as most consistent with a phylogenetic placement as a stem hominid.
- A study aiming to determine absolute crown strength and bite force of the lower postcanine teeth of Gigantopithecus blacki is published by Yi et al. (2023), who report evidence of dental specialization which might represent an adaptation to processing mechanically challenging foods.
- A study on the distinctiveness of Miocene dryopithecines from the Iberian Peninsula is published by Zanolli et al. (2023), who argue that teeth of Pierolapithecus, Anoiapithecus, Dryopithecus and Hispanopithecus show morphological differences consistent with their attribution to different genera.
- Evidence from oxygen isotopic compositions of tooth enamel, interpreted as indicating that late Pleistocene/early Holocene orangutans from Borneo lived in drier environments than both modern orangutans and late Pleistocene orangutans from Sumatra, is presented by Smith et al. (2023).
- A study comparing the dietary strategies of Pleistocene orangutans and Homo erectus from Sangiran (Java, Indonesia) is published by Kubat et al. (2023), who interpret their findings as indicating that H. erectus exploited varied food sources and was less dependent on variations in seasonal food availability than orangutans.
- The first specimen of Ouranopithecus macedoniensis with upper deciduous teeth is described from the Ravin de la Pluie locality in Axios Valley (Greece) by Koufos et al. (2023).
- A study on the ulnae of Hispanopithecus, Danuvius, 17 fossil hominin specimens and extant apes and humans is published by Meyer et al. (2023), who find the studied ulna of a specimen of Sahelanthropus tchadensis to fall within the knuckle-walking morphospace.
- Evidence from the study of a sample of specimens of 4 extinct (Ekembo heseloni, Australopithecus sediba, Homo naledi, Neanderthals) and 15 extant primate species, indicating that machine learning methods have the potential for aiding taxon identification and the interpretation of the locomotor behavior of fossil hominoid specimens, is presented by Vanhoof et al. (2023).

==== General paleoanthropology ====
- A study on the hominin habitat preferences over the past 3 million years is published by Zeller et al. (2023), who find that earliest hominins predominantly lived in environments such as grassland and dry shrubland, while later hominins adapted to a broader range of environments, and argue that members of the genus Homo may have preferentially selected areas with more diverse habitats.
- Hatala, Gatesy & Falkingham (2023) find that longitudinally arched footprints are not necessarily indicating that the hominins which produced them had longitudinally arched feet, but rather that such footprints are created through a pattern of foot kinematics that is characteristic of human walking; the authors consider Pleistocene tracks from Ileret (Kenya) to be the earliest known evidence for fully modern human-like bipedal kinematics, while tracks from Laetoli (Tanzania) show only partial evidence of the characteristic human walking style.
- Alger et al. (2023) present a model of the evolution of food production and sharing in early hominins across diverse mating systems, and propose that food sharing in early hominin populations occurred between unrelated adults before the emergence of extensive grandparenting, cooking and hunting.
- Plummer et al. (2023) report the discovery of 3.032–2.595 million-years-old fossil material of Paranthropus and Oldowan stone tools from the Nyayanga site (Homa Peninsula, Kenya), expanding known geographic range of both Paranthropus and Oldowan tools, and providing evidence that hominins were already using tools to process soft and hard plant tissues and to butcher animals, including large animals such as hippopotamids, at the Oldowan's inception; in a subsequent study Key & Proffitt (2023) apply optimal linear estimation modeling to the range of dates presented for the Nyayanga site, and find the emergence of the Oldowan to fall within the range of 2.622–3.436 million years ago, on account of the uncertainty surrounding Nyayanga's age.
- New fossil material of infant and juvenile specimens of Paranthropus robustus, providing evidence of differences in the early craniofacial development between P. robustus and Australopithecus africanus, is described from southern African sites of Kromdraai and Drimolen by Braga et al. (2023), who interpret this finding as consistent with a close relationship between Paranthropus and Homo.
- A study comparing the environments inhabited by Paranthropus boisei and early members of the genus Homo at East Turkana (Kenya) is published by O'Brien, Hebdon & Faith (2023), who report that early Homo co-occurred with bovid assemblages indicative of a broader range of environments than P. boisei, and interpret their findings as supporting the interpretation of P. boisei as an ecological specialist and of early Homo as a generalist.
- A study on the affinities of the hominin specimen KNM-ER 1500 from East Turkana (Kenya) is published by Ward et al. (2023), who interpret the anatomy of this specimen as supporting its attribution to the species Paranthropus boisei, confirming the presence of significant dimorphism of the size of the postcranial skeleton in this species.
- Alemseged (2023) reexamines the paleobiology of Australopithecus and its significance in human evolution.
- A study on the anatomy and phylogenetic affinities of Australopithecus sediba, aiming to determine whether A. sediba and Australopithecus africanus were sister taxa, is published by Mongle, Strait & Grine (2023), who report that they could not reject the hypothesis that A. sediba shared its closest phylogenetic affinities with the genus Homo.
- A three-dimensional model of bones and musculature of the pelvis and leg of Australopithecus afarensis is presented by O'Neill, Nagano & Umberger (2023).
- Wiseman (2023) presents a reconstruction of muscular configuration in the pelvis and lower limb of "Lucy", and interpret her finding as indicating that "Lucy" was capable of producing an erect posture, but also that the knee of this individual might have been suited to a range of movement types beyond those observed in modern humans.
- Hamilton, Copeland & Nelson (2023) use a strontium isotope method to identify sex biases in dispersal of Australopithecus africanus and Australopithecus/Paranthropus robustus, and interpret their findings as supporting the existence of male philopatry and female dispersal in both species, with Australopithecus/Paranthropus robustus showing greater differences between presumed males and females compared to A. africanus.
- Delagnes et al. (2023) report the discovery of stone tool assemblages from a new site complex from the Shungura Formation (Ethiopia), representing the first example of multiple, well-defined hominin occupation phases in the Shungura Formation and providing evidence that hominins were able to repeatedly exploit the studied area during the Early Pleistocene in spite of lack of abundant local raw materials suitable for stone tool manufacture.
- Evidence from the Melka Kunture site-complex (Ethiopia) interpreted as indicating that hominins were living in areas at 2000 m of altitude at least 2 million years ago is presented by Muttoni et al. (2023).
- Mussi et al. (2023) identify the infant mandible from level E at Garba IV site (Melka Kunture, Ethiopia) as belonging to the species Homo erectus, determine this mandible to be approximately 2 million-years-old (making it one of the earliest known fossils of H. erectus), and determine the presence of earliest known Acheulean tool assemblage from slightly younger strata from the same site; the conclusions of Muttoni et al. (2023) and Mussi et al. (2023) about the age of the Oldowan and early Acheulean material from the Melka Kunture site-complex are subsequently contested by Gossa et al. (2024).
- Beaudet & de Jager (2023) provide evidence of primitive organization of the Broca's area in a 1.9-million-years-old probable member of the genus Homo from Koobi Fora (Kenya).
- Pobiner, Pante & Keevil (2023) report the discovery of likely cut marks on a 1.45-million-years-old hominin tibia shaft from the Okote Member of the Koobi Fora Formation (Kenya).
- Evidence from the Simbiro III site (Melka Kunture, Ethiopia), interpreted as indicating that hominins living in this area more than 1.2 million years produced standardized, large tools with sharp cutting edges in a stone-tool workshop, exploiting an accumulation of obsidian cobbles by a meandering river, is presented by Mussi et al. (2023).
- Muller et al. (2023) report new data about a large sample of stone balls from the 'Ubeidiya site (Israel), interpreted as indicative of the existence of a complex formal technology used for intentional production of symmetrical sphere-like objects by Early Acheulean hominins.
- A study on the temporal spacing in the Asian fossil hominin record is published by Roberts et al. (2023), who argue that, in spite of their late persistence, the temporal range of Homo floresiensis and Homo luzonensis is not outside of the expected temporal range for Homo erectus.
- A study on the provenance of the hominin fossils from Trinil (Java, Indonesia) found during the 1891–1908 excavations is published by Pop et al. (2023), who interpret their findings as indicating that the age of the femur which caused Homo erectus to be given its name (Femur I) is uncertain and might be as young as ~31,000 years, as well as indicating that the taxonomic attribution of this specimen is uncertain, for it might be a bone of an individual belonging to the species Homo erectus, Homo sapiens or a Denisovan.
- Berger et al. (2023) describe possible evidence of burials of bodies of individuals of Homo naledi from the Dinaledi subsystem of the Rising Star cave (South Africa), while Berger et al. (2023) report the discovery of markings within the Dinaledi subsystem of the Rising Star Cave, interpreted by the authors as most likely to be abstract patterns and shapes produced by Homo naledi; their conclusions are subsequently contested by Martinón-Torres et al. (2023) and Foecke, Queffelec & Pickering (2024), who find the evidence presented not compelling enough to indicate that H. naledi buried their dead and produced rock art in the Rising Star Cave system.
- Rodríguez et al. (2023) determine that Epivillafranchian sabre-toothed felids from southern Europe abandoned carcasses with a nutrient content so high that scavenging was a reliable food procurement strategy for hominins, provided that the hominins foraged in groups strong enough to chase giant hyenas away from the carcasses; a subsequent study published by Mateos, Hölzchen & Rodríguez (2023) indicates that the carnivore turnover during the Epivillafranchian-Galerian transition (including the extinction of Megantereon and the appearance of Homotherium latidens) coupled with reduced ecosystem productivity during the cold intervals made the coexistence of hominin groups with giant hyenas in competition for carrion no longer viable, resulting in the extinction of Pachycrocuta brevirostris.
- Margari et al. (2023) provide evidence of pronounced climate variability in Europe during a glacial period ~1.154 to ~1.123 million years ago, culminating in extreme glacial cooling, and argue that these conditions led to the depopulation of Europe.
- Evidence from present-day human genomes, interpreted as indicative of a reduction in the population size of human ancestors to about 1000 breeding individuals between around 930,000 and 813,000 years ago, is presented by Hu et al. (2023).
- Barham et al. (2023) describe interlocking logs and wood tools from the Kalambo Falls site (Zambia), ranging from approximately 476,000 years old to approximately 324,000 years old, and providing evidence of diversity of forms of the studied structures and the capacity of hominins that made them to shape tree trunks into large combined structures.
- Konidaris et al. (2023) describe a specimen of Hippopotamus antiquus from the new Middle Pleistocene locality Marathousa 2 in the Megalopolis Basin (Greece), preserved with cut marks interpreted as evidence of butchering of the carcass by hominins.
- Cut mark evidence interpreted as indicative of systematic exploitation of beavers by hominins approximately 400,000 years ago is reported from the Bilzingsleben site (Germany) by Gaudzinski-Windheuser, Kindler & Roebroeks (2023).
- A study on the morphology of the mandible of a 300,000-years old hominin specimen from Hualongdong (China), whose skull was first described by Wu et al. (2019), is published by Wu et al. (2023), who report the presence of a combination of features resembling those of Late Pleistocene hominins and recent modern humans as well as features resembling those of Middle Pleistocene hominins, representing the first record of such a mosaic pattern in a late Middle Pleistocene hominin from East Asia, and report that the studied mandible did not possess a true chin.
- A study on a double-pointed stick from Schöningen (Germany), providing evidence of development of sophisticated woodworking techniques by hominins living ca. 300,000 years ago, is published by Milks et al. (2023).
- A study on the mandibles of hominins from the Sima de los Huesos site (Spain) is published by Quam et al. (2023), who argue that hominins from Sima de los Huesos should not be assigned to the species Homo heidelbergensis and that they were more closely related to (but distinct from) Neanderthals, indicating the presence of at least two different evolutionary lineages of hominins in Europe during the middle Pleistocene.
- Studies on the morphology of the long bones of legs of hominins from the Sima de los Huesos site are published by Rodríguez et al. (2023), who report that the tibiae and fibulae of the studied hominins overall resemble those of Neanderthals more than those of other middle Pleistocene hominins (though the tibiae were longer than those of Neanderthals, possibly resulting in better locomotor efficiency) and by Carretero et al. (2023), who report archaic pattern of femoral morphology in the studied hominins and argue that two femora from the Sima de los Huesos site originally identified as bones of men might have actually been bones of women, potentially indicating that large-bodied women were common in archaic human species.
- Brand, Colbran & Capra (2023) use machine-learning algorithm to identify putative archaic splice-altering variants in genomes of three Neanderthals and a Denisovan, and report that variants which don't also occur in modern humans are enriched in genes that contribute to phenotypic differences among hominins.
- Evidence indicating that patterns of interbreeding between Neanderthals and Denisovans correlated with climate and environmental changes in central Eurasia is presented by Ruan et al. (2023).
- Review of the research on the phenotype of Denisovans, their population history and interactions with other human groups is published by Peyrégne, Slon & Kelso (2023).
- Bacon et al. (2023) report evidence from the carbon and oxygen isotope composition of teeth of the Denisovan individual from the Cobra Cave (Laos) interpreted as indicating that this individual relied on food resources from mixed to open landscapes, and argue that Homo sapiens might have been better adapted to exploit rainforest resources compared to Denisovans.
- A study comparing the evolution of brain shape in humans and other primates is published by Sansalone et al. (2023), who determine that strong covariation between different areas of the brain in Neanderthals and modern humans evolved under higher evolutionary rates than in any other primate.
- A study on an accumulation of crania of large mammals in Level 3 of the Cueva Des-Cubierta (Madrid Region, Spain), apparently processed by Neanderthals, is published by Baquedano et al. (2023), who interpret this accumulation as a likely symbolic practice of Neanderthals.
- Evidence from the Eemian Neumark-Nord 1 site (Germany), interpreted as indicative of systematic targeting and processing of straight-tusked elephants by Neanderthals, is presented by Gaudzinski-Windheuser et al. (2023); in a subsequent study Gaudzinski-Windheuser, Kindler & Roebroeks (2023) identify elephant remains from the Gröbern and Taubach sites (Germany) with butchering patterns similar to those from Neumark-Nord, and interpret these findings as indicating that extended elephant exploitation was a widespread Neanderthal practice in the northern European plain during the early part of the Last Interglacial.
- Marquet et al. (2023) report evidence of Neanderthal engravings at La Roche-Cotard (France) interpreted as the earliest Neanderthal engravings on cave walls found to date.
- Kozowyk, Baron & Langejans (2023) report that aceramic birch tar production techniques used by Neanderthals cannot be reliably identified with current methods of distinguishing ceramic tar production processes using gas chromatography-mass spectrometry.
- Kozowyk, Fajardo & Langejans (2023) report that the production process of birch tar in stone chambers with a technique likely used by Neanderthals becomes more complex with the increase of the number of concurrent production assemblies, and explore possible implications of the complexity of the scaled-up production for the knowledge of the cognitive and behavioural capacities of Neanderthals.
- Fajardo, Kozowyk & Langejans (2023) evaluate the complexity of the Paleolithic tar production processes, and interpret their findings as indicating that Neanderthals might have had technical cognition analogous to that of modern humans.
- The most extensive collection of Neanderthal remains from the northeastern Mediterranean Iberia reported to date is described from Simanya Gran (the main gallery of the Simanya cave) by Morales et al. (2023).
- Russo et al. (2023) report the discovery of a cave lion specimen from Siegsdorf (Germany) preserved with hunting lesions (a partial puncture and possible drag marks) and butchery marks, interpreted as the earliest evidence of Neanderthals hunting cave lions with wooden spears, and cave lion remains from the Unicorn Cave with cut marks consistent with those generated during skinning, interpreted as the earliest evidence of the utilization of a cave lion pelt by Neanderthals.
- Abbas et al. (2023) report the presence of Late Quaternary wetland sediments at the Wadi Hasa, Gregra and Wadi Gharandal areas in the Jordan desert, and interpret their findings as indicating that during the Marine Isotope Stage 5 the Levant was a well-watered route for human dispersal out of Africa.
- Freidline et al. (2023) report the discovery of new fossil material of Homo sapiens from the Tam Pà Ling cave (Laos), providing evidence of an early dispersal of Homo sapiens into Southeast Asia by at least approximately 70,000 years ago.
- Bacon et al. (2023) study non-figurative signs associated with images of animals in European caves which were produced by Upper Paleolithic humans, and interpret those signs as an early form of writing used to convey seasonal behavioural information about prey animals.
- Evidence from genomes of people from sub-Saharan African populations, interpreted as indicative of multiple migration events of anatomically modern humans out of Africa, of bidirectional gene flow between Neanderthals and anatomically modern humans, and of deleterious interactions between Neanderthal and modern human alleles consistent with incipient speciation, is presented by Harris et al. (2023).
- A study on the Neanderthal ancestry in modern human populations across space and time is published by Quilodrán et al. (2023), who interpret their findings as indicating that the greater Neanderthal ancestry in human populations from eastern Eurasia compared to western Eurasia was caused by the expansion of Neolithic/Chalcolithic farmers (carrying less Neanderthal DNA than Paleolithic hunter-gatherers) approximately 10,000 years before present, as before that event the level of Neanderthal ancestry in human populations from western Eurasia was higher than in eastern Eurasia.
- Gicqueau et al. (2023) identify an ilium of an anatomically modern human baby found among Neanderthal remains from the Châtelperronian layers in the Grotte du Renne (France), and explore different hypotheses about the studied finding, including interpretations of the finding as possible evidence that Neanderthals and anatomically modern humans which either coexisted in mixed groups or alternately occupied the same sites were makers of the Châtelperronian.
- A study on the productivity of European ecosystems during the Marine Isotope Stage 3 is published by Vidal-Cordasco et al. (2023), who report evidence of long coexistence of Neanderthals and Homo sapiens in the areas with high and stable ecosystem productivity, as well as evidence of disappearance of Neanderthals before or shortly after the arrival of Homo sapiens in the areas with low or unstable ecosystem productivity.
- A study on the environmental changes in the Lake Baikal region during the Marine Isotope Stage 3, as indicated by palynological data, is published by Shichi et al. (2023), who find that the dispersal of Homo sapiens into Baikal Siberia coincided with climate changes resulting in warm and humid conditions and vegetation changes.
- Rigaud et al. (2023) report the discovery of an approximately 42,000-year-old pendant found at the Paleolithic site of Tolbor-21 (Mongolia), interpreted as a phallus-like representation and providing evidence of production of three-dimensional images of the human body at the time of early dispersals of Homo sapiens in Eurasia.
- Evidence from genomes of two 36,000–37,000-year-old individuals from Buran-Kaya III (Crimea), interpreted as indicative of the closest similarity of the studied individuals to Gravettian-associated individuals living several thousand years later in southwestern Europe, as well as indicating that the population turnover in Europe after 40,000 years ago involved admixture with pre-existing European populations, is presented by Bennett et al. (2023).
- Fragment of an ammonite with modifications indicative of intentional carving is described from the c. 36,200-year-old strata from the Grotte des Gorges (Jura, France) by d'Errico et al. (2023), who interpret the finding as modified to represent the head of a caniform carnivoran, and produced by the craftsman emulating figurines made of mammoth ivory, but also introducing substantial technical, thematic and stylistic innovations.

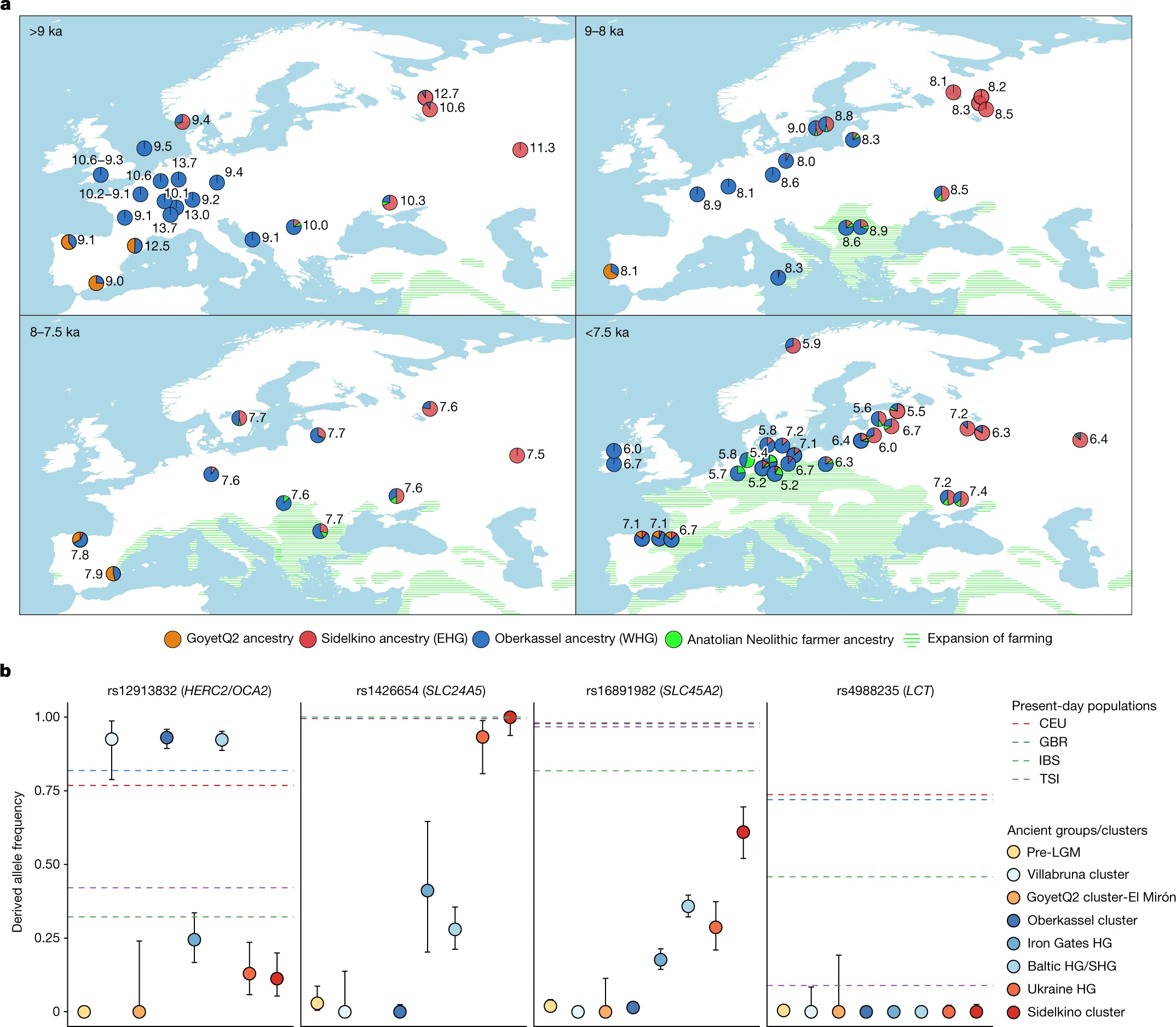
Ancestry modelling of hunter-gatherers from 14 to 5.2 ka and their allele frequencies on phenotypic SNPs

- Posth et al. (2023) study genomes of hunter-gatherers from western and central Eurasia, spanning between 35,000 and 5,000 years ago, finding that individuals associated with the Gravettian culture across Europe were not a biologically homogeneous population (with some individuals from western Europe having a genetic ancestry profile resembling that of the individuals associated with the Aurignacian culture), reporting that human populations with this ancestry profile survived in southwestern Europe during the Last Glacial Maximum and subsequently re-expanded northeastward, and finding evidence of replacement of human groups in southern Europe around the time of the Last Glacial Maximum.
- Evidence from impact-related fractures of projectiles from the Maisières-Canal site (Belgium), interpreted as indicating that spearthrower was used 31,000 years ago for launching projectiles armed with tanged flint points from the studied sample, is presented by Coppe, Taipale & Rots (2023).
- Villalba-Mouco et al. (2023) present genome-wide data from a 23,000-year-old Solutrean-associated individual from Cueva del Malalmuerzo (Spain), carrying genetic ancestry interpreted as directly connecting earlier Aurignacian-associated individuals with post-Last Glacial Maximum Magdalenian-associated ancestry in western Europe.
- Pigati et al. (2023) reevaluate the age of human footprints from the White Sands National Park (New Mexico, United States) originally described by Bennett et al. (2021), and interpret their findings as supporting the presence of humans in North America during the Last Glacial Maximum.
- Evidence from blood residues from Paleoamerican stone tools from North and South Carolina, indicative of exploitation of extinct megafauna by Clovis and other Paleoamerican cultures in the Carolinas, is presented by Moore et al. (2023).
- A study on the functional performance of hafted Clovis knife replicas is published by Mika et al. (2023), who interpret their findings as indicating that the use of hafted technologies may have reduced the impact that the anatomical variation between hands of different individuals had on a tools' performance, and removed evolutionary selective pressures associated with the use of flaked stone tools.
- Evidence interpreted as indicating that three giant sloth osteoderms from the Santa Elina rock shelter (Brazil) were intentionally modified into artefacts during the Last Glacial Maximum, before fossilization of the bones, is presented by Pansani et al. (2023).
- Evidence of the use of plant-based red colourant by Natufians is reported from the Kebara Cave site (Israel) by Davin, Bellot-Gurlet & Navas (2023).
- A study on the Magdalenian rock art from the Atxurra Cave (Spain) is published by Garate et al. (2023), who interpret the studied rock art as indicative of planning prior to artistic production, as well as adapted to be seen by a third person from different positions.
- A study on genomic data from remains of humans from Poland, Romania and Ukraine living before and after the Neolithic transition is published by Mattila et al. (2023), who report evidence indicative of the existence of an admixture cline between genetically differentiated groups from Central Europe and Siberia before Neolithic, as well as evidence of stronger genetic continuity after the Neolithic transition in the Dnieper Valley region than in the areas further west.
- Evidence from a high-coverage genome of Ötzi, interpreted as indicative of descent from both early Neolithic European farmers (who in turn were descendants of early Anatolian farmers) and European hunter-gatherers (with the admixture between these groups happening approximately 4880–4400 years BCE) but without any evidence for Steppe-related ancestry, as well as indicative of a rather dark skin (as also displayed by the actual mummy) and possibly also of male-pattern baldness, is presented by Wang et al. (2023).
- Lenssen-Erz et al. (2023) report results of the analysis of the Late Stone Age engravings of animal tracks and human footprints from the Doro! nawas mountains (Namibia) by Ju/'hoansi tracking experts, providing evidence of inclusion of engravings of tracks of a number of animal species that don't occur in the region in the present, and indicating that the engravings are not generic forms, include markers of sex and age, and reveal divergent preferences and priorities of the engravers in the depiction of animal tracks and human footprints.
- A study of ancient DNA supports or confirms that recent human evolution to resist infection of pathogens also increased inflammatory disease risk in post-Neolithic Europeans over the last 10,000 years, estimating nature, strength, and time of onset of selections.
- Archaeologists report the earliest evidence of bow and arrow use outside Africa – ~54,000 years ago in France, showing the earliest known H. sapiens to migrate into Neandertal territories used these technologies.

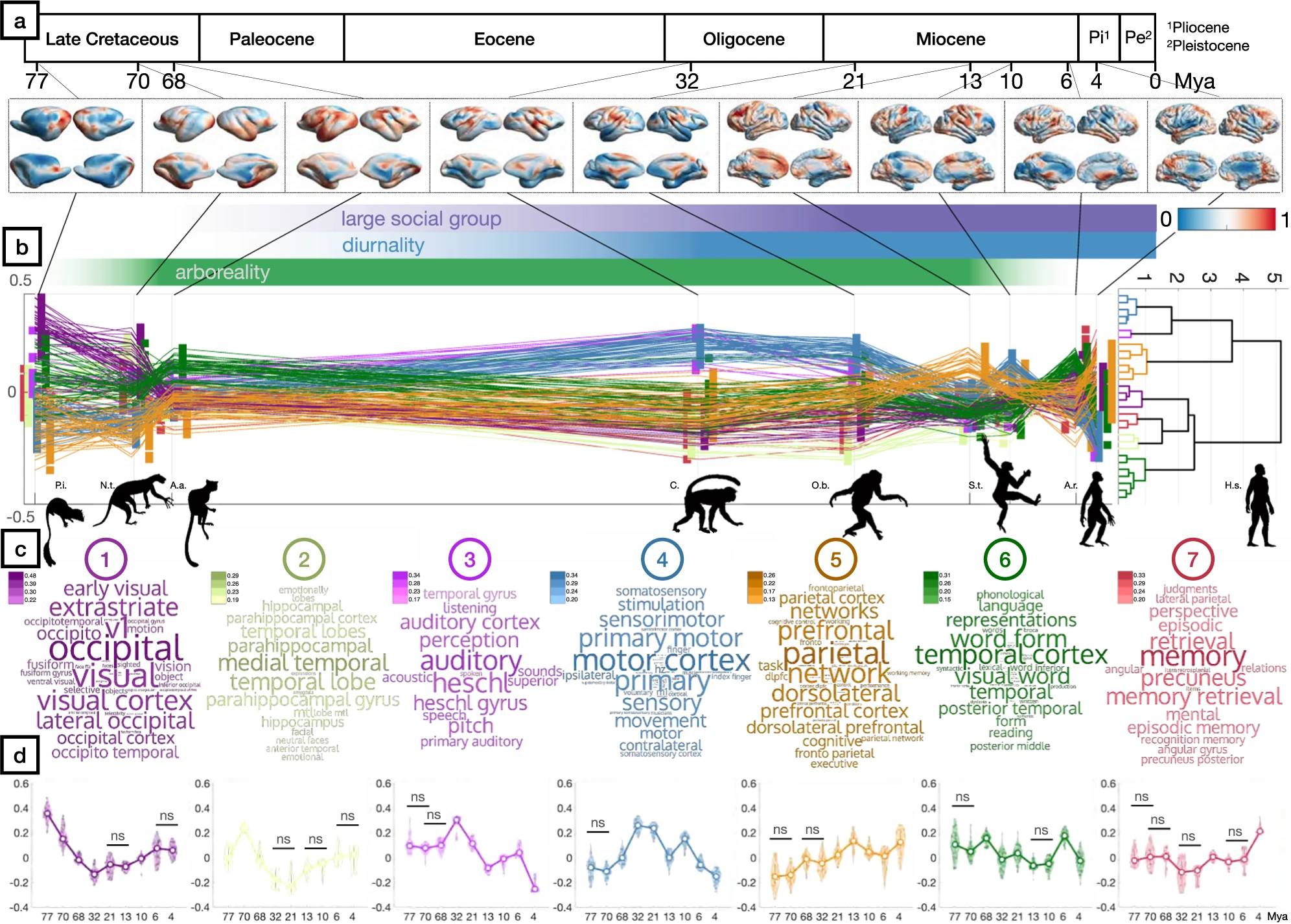
Estimated sequence of local cortical expansion from the last common ancestor of rodents and primates to Homo (more)

- Paleoneurologists publish the first neuroevolutionary timeline about correlations of changes in the shape of the cerebral cortex and functions, showing "variability in surface geometry relates to species' ecology and behaviour" and cognition. It characterizes many of the neuromorphological events in the origin of distinct human intelligence over the past 77 million years.

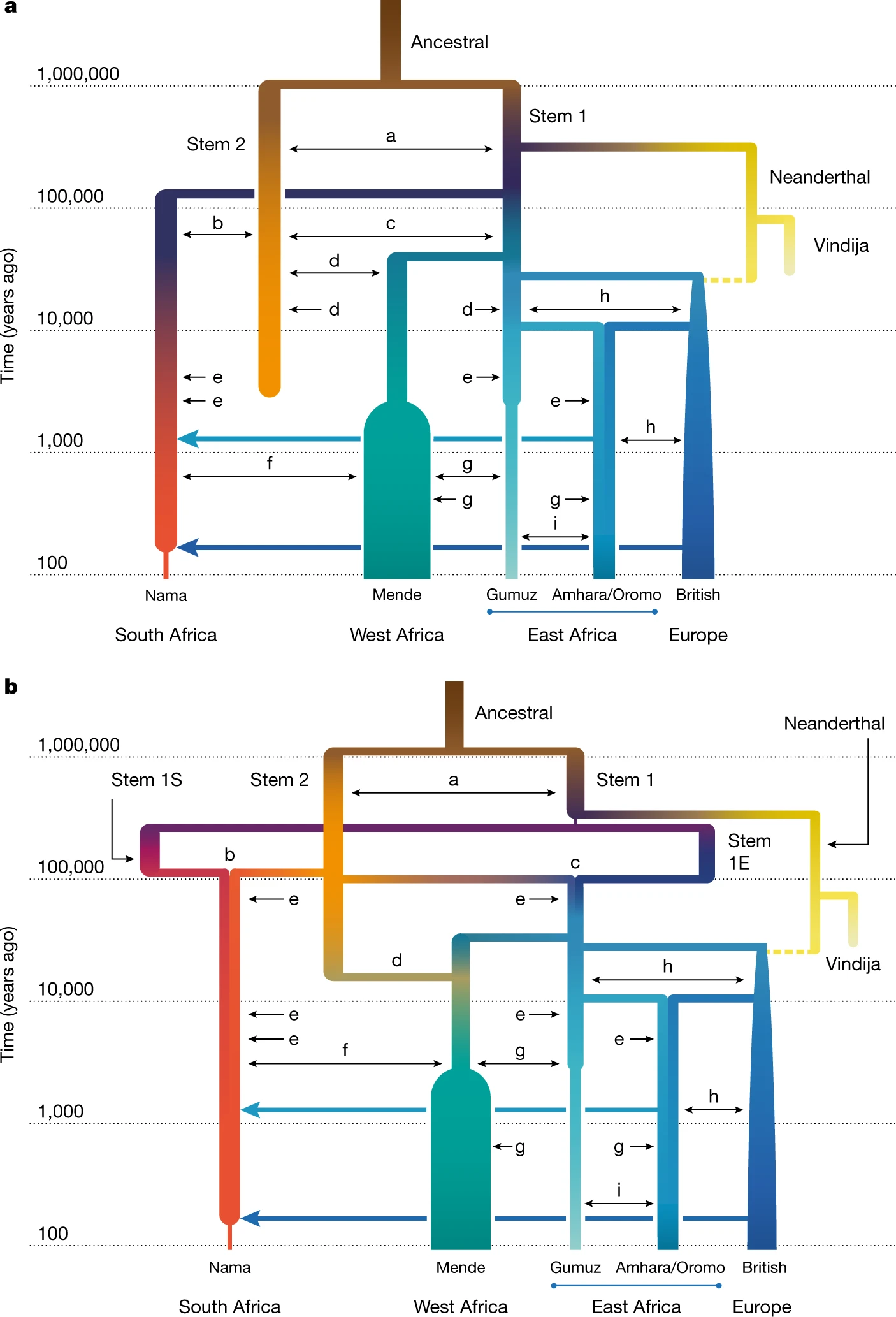
Best models for the human evolutionary origins

- Genetic anthropologists report a more complex pathway of human evolution using ancient genomes and new models. They conclude humans evolved from different places and times in Africa, instead of from a single location and period of time.
- A phylogenetic study proposes a hybrid of the farming and steppe hypotheses for the origin of Indo-European languages, contradicting elements of both.
- Researchers report a theory linking a reduction in prey size in the Paleolithic to the evolution of technologies and cognitive abilities as they had to change their behaviors, skills, weapons, and strategies.
- The world's oldest wooden construction, discovered in 2019 in Zambia and dating back ~476,000 years, is reported. It represents an unexpected early capacity to shape tree trunks into large combined structures, changing views of the technical cognition of early hominins.

=== Rodents ===
Name	Novelty	Status	Authors	Age	Type locality	Country	Notes	Images
Anchitheriomys buceei	Sp. nov	Valid	May & Brown	Miocene (Barstovian)	Lagarto Formation	United States (Texas)	A member of the family Castoridae belonging to the subfamily Anchitheriomyinae.	
Aurimys	Gen. et sp. nov	Valid	Samuels, Calede & Hunt	Miocene (Arikareean)	John Day Formation	United States (Oregon)	A member of the family Heteromyidae belonging to the subfamily Dipodomyinae. The type species is A. xeros.	
Caviocricetus guenekko	Sp. nov	Valid	McGrath et al.	Miocene		Chile	A member of Caviomorpha belonging to the group Pan-Octodontoidea.	
Deperetomys dingusi	Sp. nov	Valid	Martin, Kelly & Holroyd	Late Oligocene or early Miocene	John Day Formation	United States (Oregon)	A cricetodontine-like muroid rodent.	
Dudumus berggreni	Sp. nov	Valid	McGrath et al.	Miocene		Chile	A member of Caviomorpha belonging to the group Pan-Octodontoidea.	
Ellesmereomys	Gen. et sp. nov	Valid	Martin & Zakrzewski	Pliocene		Canada (Nunavut)	A member of the family Cricetidae belonging to the subfamily Baranomyinae. The type species is E. haringtoni.	
Eopetes	Gen. et sp. nov		Li et al.	Eocene	Keziletuogayi Formation	China	A member of the family Sciuridae belonging to the subfamily Sciurinae. The type species is E. irtyshensis.	
Hesperopetes mccorquodalei	Sp. nov	Valid	Bell, Meyer & Storer	Oligocene	Cypress Hills Formation	Canada (Saskatchewan)	A member of the family Sciuridae.	
Hystrix kayae	Sp. nov		Halaçlar et al.	Miocene		Turkey	A species of Hystrix.	
Hystrix velunensis	Sp. nov	Valid	Czernielewski	Pliocene		Poland	A species of Hystrix. Announced in 2022; the final article version was published in 2023.	
Junggarisciurus	Gen. et sp. nov		Li et al.	Eocene	Keziletuogayi Formation	China	A member of the family Sciuridae belonging to the subfamily Sciurinae. The type species is J. jeminaiensis.	
Karakoromys conjunctus	Sp. nov		Xu et al.	Oligocene	Ulantatal Formation	China	A gundi.	
Microtodon hoyensis	Sp. nov		Kelly & Martin	Miocene		United States (Nevada)	A cricetid rodent.	
Miorhizomys gigas	Sp. nov	Valid	Flynn et al.	Miocene	Zhaotong Formation	China	A member of the family Spalacidae belonging to the subfamily Rhizomyinae.	
Mus absconditus	Sp. nov	Valid	Flynn & Kimura	Miocene		Pakistan	A species of Mus.	
Myospalax convexus	Sp. nov	Valid	Golovanov & Zazhigin	Early Pleistocene	Kochkovo Formation	Russia	A species of Myospalax.	
Myospalax myospalax krukoveri	Ssp. nov	Valid	Golovanov & Zazhigin	Middle Pleistocene		Russia	A subspecies of the Siberian zokor.	
Notomys magnus	Sp. nov	Valid	Vakil et al.	Middle Pleistocene to Holocene		Australia	A hopping mouse.	
Octomys rosiae	Sp. nov	Valid	Verzi et al.	Holocene		Argentina	A species of Octomys.	
Palaeocavia humahuaquense	Sp. nov		Candela et al.	Miocene	Maimará Formation	Argentina		
Pedomys javaensis	Sp. nov		Martin & Fox	Early Pleistocene		United States (South Dakota)	A relative of the prairie vole.	
Pithanotomys? solisae	Sp. nov		Candela et al.	Miocene	Maimará Formation	Argentina		
Prodistylomys mongoliensis	Sp. nov	Valid	Oliver et al.	Miocene		Mongolia	A gundi belonging to the subfamily Distylomyinae.	
Prodistylomys taatsinius	Sp. nov	Valid	Oliver et al.	Miocene		Mongolia	A gundi belonging to the subfamily Distylomyinae.	
Prosiphneus razdoleanensis	Sp. nov	Valid	Golovanov & Zazhigin	Early Pleistocene	Kochkovo Formation	Russia	A zokor. Originally described as a species of Prosiphneus, but subsequently transferred to the genus Sibirosiphneus.	
Protansomys amplius	Sp. nov	Valid	Meyer, Storer & Gilbert	Oligocene (Orellan)	Cypress Hills Formation	Canada (Saskatchewan)	A member of the family Aplodontiidae.	
Rattus baoshanensis	Sp. nov		Chang et al.	Pliocene	Yangyi Formation	China	A species of Rattus.	
Sayimys fuhaiensis	Sp. nov	Valid	Flynn et al.	Miocene	Halamagai Formation	China	A gundi.	
Sayimys linxiacus	Sp. nov	Valid	Flynn et al.	Miocene	Dongxiang Formation	China	A gundi.	
Sciurion ikimekooyensis	Sp. nov	Valid	Bell, Meyer & Storer	Oligocene	Cypress Hills Formation	Canada (Saskatchewan)	A member of the family Sciuridae.	
Sciurion oligocaenicus	Sp. nov	Valid	Bell, Meyer & Storer	Oligocene	Cypress Hills Formation	Canada (Saskatchewan)	A member of the family Sciuridae.	
Yuomys dawai	Sp. nov	Valid	Ni & Li in Ni et al.	Eocene (Irdinmanhan)	Gemusi Formation	China	A member of Hystricognathi belonging to the family Yuomyidae.	
Yuomys gemuensis	Sp. nov	Valid	Ni & Li in Ni et al.	Eocene (Irdinmanhan)	Gemusi Formation	China	A member of Hystricognathi belonging to the family Yuomyidae.	
Zorania	Gen. et sp. nov	Valid	Van de Weerd, de Bruijn & Wessels	Oligocene	Selimye Formation	Turkey	A member of Hystricognathi belonging to the group Baluchimyinae. The type species is Z. milosi.	

==== Rodent research ====
- Crespo et al. (2023) describe a diverse Early Miocene dormice assemblage from the Ribesalbes-Alcora Basin (Spain), including several taxa reported for the first time from the studied basin.
- A study on the dietary habits of extinct squirrels, as indicated by tooth morphology of extant and extinct taxa, is published by Menéndez et al. (2023).
- Sinitsa, Tleuberdina & Pita (2023) describe fossil material of Sinotamias orientalis from the Miocene Pavlodar (Gusinyi Perelet) fossil site in northern Kazakhstan, documenting previously unknown skull features of Sinotamias, and interpret the anatomy of the studied fossils as suggestive of a close phylogenetic relationship between Sinotamias and extant antelope squirrels and members of the genus Callospermophilus.
- Sinitsa & Tesakov (2023) describe fossil material of squirrels from the Miocene strata from the Tagay site (Olkhon Island, Russia), interpreted as indicative of the presence of wooded biotopes, and including fossil material of Blackia cf. miocaenica, found more than 4000 km from the previously known easternmost occurrences of Blackia.
- A study aiming to determine the locomotor behaviour of Diamantomys luederitzi on the basis of its skull and distal humerus morphologies is published by Bento Da Costa, Bardin & Senut (2023), who find evidence for fossorial, terrestrial and arboreal behaviour in different analyses, possibly indicative of a generalist lifestyle and/or intraspecific variation.
- The first description of the endocast of Prospaniomys priscus is presented by Arnaudo & Arnal (2023).
- Fossil tetrapod burrows, interpreted as produced by a communal species (most likely a member of the genus Lagostomus), are described from the Cerro Azul Formation (Argentina) by Cardonatto, Feola & Melchor (2023), who name a new ichnotaxon Maneraichnus pampeanum.
- Lechner & Böhme (2023) describe the extensive set of dental remains of Euroxenomys minutus from the Hammerschmiede clay pit (Germany), representing the largest set of the fossil material of this beaver from the Miocene, and interpret the studied material as indicative of mortality patterns of E. minutus from rivulets, rivers and swamps, which differs from the fossil record of Steneofiber depereti which shows evidence of different mortality patterns in different environments, and might indicate differences in the ecology of the two beaver species and greater vulnerability of E. minutus to predation.
- Evidence indicating that skull and postcranial morphology of Castor californicus falls largely within the range of variation seen within the North American beaver is presented by Lubbers & Samuels (2023), who interpret their findings as consistent with C. californicus and the North American beaver representing chronospecies, and confirming that the studied beavers can be considered ecological analogs.
- A study on tooth wear stages in blind mole-rats from the Pliocene sites in Greece and Turkey, and on their implications for blind mole-rat taxonomy, is published by Skandalos & van den Hoek Ostende (2023), who consider Pliospalax sotirisi to be a junior synonym of P. macoveii.
- Patnaik et al. (2023) describe new fossil material of the rhizomyine species Rhizomyides lydekkeri from the late Pliocene Siwalik localities Khetpurali and Kanthro (India), consider R. saketiensis to be a junior synonym of R. lydekkeri, interpret R. lydekkeri as moderately fossorial, and study the phylogenetic affinities of this rodent, recovering it as a member of a grade of late Miocene and Pliocene members of the genus Rhizomyides from the Indian subcontinent and Afghanistan.
- Xie, Zhang & Li (2023) describe large-sized hamster material from the Middle Pleistocene Locality 2 of Shanyangzhai (Hebei, China), interpreted as remains of the greater long-tailed hamster, and reinterpret Cricetinus varians as a subspecies of the greater long-tailed hamster, resulting in a new combination Tscherskia triton varians.
- The first Pliocene sigmodontines found in South America outside Argentina, representing the oldest known records of the genera Zygodontomys and Oligoryzomys, are reported from the San Gregorio Formation (Venezuela) by Ronez et al. (2023), who interpret this finding as supporting the possibility of a dispersal of the ancestors of sigmodontines into South America through the Antilles corridor, as well as potentially supporting the existence of open landscapes allowing the interchange between north and south portions of South America during the Neogene.
- Sehgal et al. (2023) describe a new assemblage of Miocene rodents from the Siwalik site of Dunera (India), including fossil material which might extend known age ranges of Progonomys cf. hussaini and cf. Tamias urialis.
- Winkler (2023) describes new fossil material of late Miocene and early Pliocene rodents from the Tugen Hills (Kenya), including some of the earliest records of members of the genera Paraxerus, Arvicanthis, either Grammomys or Thallomys and possibly also Heliosciurus.

=== Other euarchontoglires ===
Name	Novelty	Status	Authors	Age	Type locality	Country	Notes	Images
Afrolagus	Gen. et sp. nov	Valid	Sen & Geraads	Plio-Pleistocene		Morocco	A member of the family Leporidae. Genus includes new species A. pomeli.	
Edworthia greggi	Sp. nov	Valid	Scott et al.	Paleocene	Paskapoo Formation	Canada (Alberta)	A plesiadapiform belonging to the family Paromomyidae.	
Ignacius dawsonae	Sp. nov	Valid	Miller, Tietjen & Beard	Wasatchian	Margaret Formation	Canada (Nunavut)	A plesiadapiform belonging to the family Paromomyidae.	
Ignacius glenbowensis	Sp. nov	Valid	Scott et al.	Paleocene	Paskapoo Formation	Canada (Alberta)	A plesiadapiform belonging to the family Paromomyidae.	
Ignacius mckennai	Sp. nov	Valid	Miller, Tietjen & Beard	Wasatchian	Margaret Formation	Canada (Nunavut)	A plesiadapiform belonging to the family Paromomyidae.	
Pliopentalagus okuyamai	Sp. nov	Valid	Tomida & Takahashi	Pliocene	Ueno Formation	Japan	A member of the family Leporidae belonging to the subfamily Leporinae.	
Prolagus migrans	Sp. nov	Valid	Sen & Geraads	Plio-Pleistocene		Morocco		
Trischizolagus meridionalis	Sp. nov	Valid	Sen & Geraads	Plio-Pleistocene		Morocco	A member of the family Leporidae.	

==== Miscellaneous euarchontoglires research ====
- López-Torres et al. (2023) present the first virtual endocast of an anagalid (the holotype of Anagale gobiensis), reporting evidence of the presence of traits observed in fossorial mammals, and of relatively large olfactory bulbs suggesting that A. gobiensis was olfaction-driven.
- A study on the morphology of the mandibles of members of the stem group of Glires from the Paleocene of China, providing evidence of diversification and specialization of chewing modes interpreted as indicative of different dietary specializations, is published by Fostowicz-Frelik, Cox & Li (2023).
- Evidence from ancient DNA interpreted as supporting the placement of the Sardinian pika in an independent sister group to the family Ochotonidae is presented by Utzeri et al. (2023).
- A study on the bone histology of the Sardinian pika specimens from the Late Pleistocene Grotta della Medusa, providing evidence of weaning of pups at large size, delayed maturation and minimum lifespan of 8 years, is published by Fernández-Bejarano et al. (2023).
- A study on the structure of the bony labyrinth of Megalagus turgidus, interpreted as indicative of rabbit-like hearing sensitivity and locomotor behavior, is published by López-Torres et al. (2023).
- A study on the bone histology of Nuralagus rex, providing evidence of slow growth and delayed maturity, is published by Köhler et al. (2023).
- The first frozen mummy of an adult Pleistocene hare Lepus tanaiticus is described from Sakha (Russia) by Boeskorov, Chernova & Shchelchkova (2023).
- Evidence from mitochondrial DNA interpreted as indicating that "Lepus tanaiticus" represents an ancient morphotype of the mountain hare rather than a distinct species is presented by Rabiniak et al. (2023).
- White et al. (2023) present the virtual endocast of a specimen of Niptomomys cf. N. doreenae from the Paleocene of Wyoming (United States), and interpret the anatomy of the brain of this plesiadapiform as consistent with the interpretations of plesiadapiforms as being more olfaction-focused than euprimates.
- A study on the distal phalanx morphology in plesiadapiforms is published by Maiolino et al. (2023), who report the presence of morphological similarities to extant mammals adapted to vertical climbing, as well as evidence of adaptations to different ways of grasping tree branches when climbing in different plesiadapiform taxa.

== Laurasiatherians ==
=== Artiodactyls ===
==== Cetaceans ====
Name	Novelty	Status	Authors	Age	Type locality	Country	Notes	Images
Brevirostrodelphis	Gen. et comb. nov	Valid	Godfrey & Lambert	Miocene (Burdigalian)	Calvert Formation	United States (Maryland)	A member of Delphinida. The type species is "Delphinodon" dividum True (1912).	
Cammackacetus	Gen. et sp. nov	Valid	Godfrey & Lambert	Miocene (Tortonian)	St. Marys Formation	United States (Maryland)	A member of Delphinida. The type species is C. hazenorum.	
Caolodelphis	Gen. et sp. nov	Valid	Godfrey & Lambert	Miocene (Burdigalian)	Calvert Formation	United States (Maryland)	A toothed whale of uncertain affinities. The type species is C. milleri.	
Charadrobalaena	Gen. et sp. nov	Valid	Bisconti et al.	Pliocene		Italy	A member of the family Balaenidae. The type species is C. valentinae.	
Coronodon newtonorum	Sp. nov	Valid	Boessenecker, Beatty & Geisler	Oligocene	Chandler Bridge Formation	United States (South Carolina)		
Coronodon planifrons	Sp. nov	Valid	Boessenecker, Beatty & Geisler	Oligocene	Chandler Bridge Formation	United States (South Carolina)		
Crisocetus	Gen. et sp. nov		Gaetán, Paolucci & Buono	Miocene	Gaiman Formation	Argentina	A toothed whale with anatomical similarities to members of the family Squaloziphiidae. The type species is C. lydekkeri.	
Diaphorocetus ortegai	Sp. nov	Valid	Lambert et al.	Miocene	Chilcatay Formation	Peru	A member of the stem group of Physeteroidea.	
Enigmatocetus	Gen. et sp. nov	Valid	Godfrey & Lambert	Miocene	Calvert Formation	United States (Virginia)	A toothed whale of uncertain affinities. The type species is E. posidoni.	
Grimadelphis	Gen. et sp. nov	Valid	Godfrey & Lambert	Miocene	Calvert Formation	United States (Maryland)	A member of the family Platanistidae. The type species is G. spectorum.	
Herbeinodelphis	Gen. et sp. nov	Valid	Godfrey & Lambert	Miocene (Serravallian)	Calvert Formation	United States (Maryland)	A member of Delphinida. The type species is H. nancei.	
Ihlengesi changoensis	Sp. nov	Valid	Bianucci et al.	Plio-Pleistocene	Iquique Basin	Pacific Ocean off the Chilean coast	A beaked whale.	
Jobancetus	Gen. et sp. nov	Valid	Kimura, Hasegawa & Suzuki	Miocene (Burdigalian)	Minamishirado Formation	Japan	A baleen whale of uncertain affinities. Genus includes new species J. pacificus. Published online in 2022, but the issue date is listed as January 2023.	
Miminiacetus	Gen. et comb. nov	Valid	Godfrey & Lambert	Miocene (Langhian and Serravallian)	Calvert Formation	United States (Maryland)	A member of Delphinida. The type species is "Lophocetus" pappus Kellogg (1955).	
Nihohae	Gen. et sp. nov	Valid	Coste, Fordyce & Loch	Oligocene		New Zealand	A dolphin related to "waipatiids". The type species is N. matakoi.	
Nihoroa	Gen. et sp. nov	Valid	Coste, Fordyce & Loch	Oligocene	Otekaike Limestone	New Zealand	A member of Waipatiidae. The type species is N. reimaea.	
Olympicetus thalassodon	Sp. nov	Valid	Velez-Juarbe	Oligocene	Pysht Formation	United States (Washington)	A member of the family Simocetidae.	
Perucetus	Gen. et sp. nov	Valid	Bianucci et al.	Eocene (Bartonian)	Paracas Formation	Peru	A basilosaurid. The type species is P. colossus.	
Pictodelphis	Gen. et sp. nov	Valid	Godfrey & Lambert	Miocene (Langhian)	Calvert Formation	United States (Maryland)	A member of Delphinida. The type species is P. kidwellae.	
Platysvercus	Gen. et sp. nov		Guo & Kohno	Miocene (Burdigalian)	Sugota Formation	Japan	A member of the family Kentriodontidae. The type species is P. ugonis.	
Pomatodelphis santamaria	Sp. nov	Valid	Godfrey & Lambert	Miocene (Tortonian)	St. Marys Formation	United States (Maryland)		
Squalodon murdochi	Sp. nov	Valid	Godfrey & Lambert	Miocene (Langhian)	Calvert Formation	United States (Maryland)		
Tutcetus	Gen. et sp. nov		Antar et al.	Eocene	Fayum Depression	Egypt	A basilosaurid. The type species is T. rayanensis	
Westmorelandelphis	Gen. et sp. nov	Valid	Godfrey & Lambert	Miocene (Serravallian)	Choptank Formation	United States (Virginia)	A member of Delphinida. The type species is W. tacheroni.	
Xenorophus simplicidens	Sp. nov		Boessenecker & Geisler	Oligocene	Chandler Bridge Formation	United States (South Carolina)	A member of Xenorophidae.	

===== Cetacean research =====
- A study on the evolution of the body length of cetaceans, providing evidence of very few global shifts in body length after cetaceans entered the oceans, but also of multiple local, more taxonomically restricted shifts, is published by Burin et al. (2023).
- A study on the morphological diversity of lower jaws of cetaceans throughout their evolutionary history is published by Coombs et al. (2023), who find evidence of two periods of rapid evolution resulting in the greatest morphological diversity (in the early to mid-Eocene archaeocetes and in the mid-Oligocene toothed whales), and identify dietary specializations and echolocation as evolutionary drivers with the strongest influence on the lower jaw morphology.
- A hindlimb of a fully aquatic cetacean living 43–42 million years ago is described from Ukraine by Davydenko et al. (2023), who interpret this finding as indicating that some early fully aquatic cetaceans had functional hindlimbs that could be involved in advanced styles of swimming.
- Davydenko et al. (2023) describe an isolated tibia fragment from the Eocene of Helmstedt (Germany), which most likely belonged to an archaeocete and might represent either the first record of Protocetidae from Europe or evidence that early basilosaurids had large, protocetid-like hindlimbs.
- Van Vliet et al. (2023) assign a cetacean vertebra from the Eocene (Lutetian or Bartonian) strata of the Folgarolas/Folgueroles Formation (Spain) to a small-sized species of Pachycetus, expanding the geographic distribution of this genus to southwestern Europe.
- A study on the bone microanatomy of two basilosaurid specimens from the Eocene deposits of Ukraine assigned to the genus Basilotritus, providing evidence of an advanced system of ballast distribution in the skeleton, is published by Davydenko, Tretiakov & Gol'din (2023).
- Revision of the eurhinodelphinid cranial material from the Miocene Pietra da Cantoni Formation in the Monferrato area (Piedmont, Italy) is published by Tosetto et al. (2023), who also study the phylogenetic relationships and biogeography of eurhinodelphinids, interpreting their presence in the Mediterranean, Northwest Atlantic and Paratethys as the result of different dispersal events from a Northeast Atlantic center of origin.
- Viglino et al. (2023) describe tooth enamel and dentin microstructure in Notocetus vanbenedeni and Phoberodon arctirostris, and interpret their findings as indicative of a raptorial feeding strategy in P. arctirostris and of a combination suction feeding method in N. vanbenedeni, as well as indicative of greater diversity of tooth morphology and enamel structure in extant toothed whales than in extinct ones.
- Benites-Palomino et al. (2023) report the discovery of new fossil material of Caribbean cetaceans from the Miocene Chagres Formation (Panama), including Piscolithax sp. cf. Acrophyseter sp. and indeterminate scaphokogiine, and consider the studied assemblage to have the closest affinities with the cetacean assemblage from the Pisco Formation (Peru), providing evidence that the Caribbean–Pacific water interchange continued during the shallowing of the Central American Seaway in the Miocene.
- Fossil material of a member of Chaeomysticeti, representing the largest baleen whale from the early Miocene reported to date, is described from the Mannum Formation (Australia) by Rule et al. (2023), who argue that baleen whales first evolved large body size in the Southern Hemisphere.
- Ritsche & Hampe (2023) describe periotic bones of two basal members of Balaenomorpha from the Miocene Biemenhorst Subformation of the Breda Formation (Germany), showing characters or character combinations never seen before in known baleen whales, and revise important anatomical characteristics of the periotic bones of baleen whales.
- Tanaka, Nagasawa & Oba (2023) describe a skull of a rorqual from the Pliocene-Pleistocene Shinazawa Formation (Japan), identified as aff. Balaenoptera bertae and extending known geographic range of the lineage of B. bertae (formerly known only from the Pliocene Purisima Formation, California, United States).
- Govender & Marx (2023) describe new baleen whale fossils the early Pliocene localities of Saldanha Steel, Milnerton and Langebaanweg (South Africa), including fossils of rorquals belonging to the genera Diunatans and Fragilicetus (previously known only from the North Sea), as well as potentially younger specimens trawled from the seafloor off the Cape Peninsula and south coast of South Africa, including the first pygmy right whale fossil material from Africa reported to date.

==== Other artiodactyls ====
Name	Novelty	Status	Authors	Age	Type locality	Country	Notes	Images
Bos primigenius thrinacius	Ssp. nov		Siarabi et al.	Pleistocene		Greece	A subspecies of the aurochs.	
Dama celiae	Sp. nov		van der Made et al.	Pleistocene		Spain	A species of fallow-deer.	
Entelodontellus	Gen. et sp. nov	Valid	Yu et al.	Eocene	Caijiachong Formation	China	An entelodont. The type species is E. zhouliangi.	
Gazellospira tsaparangensis	Sp. nov	Valid	Wang, Li & Tseng	Pliocene	Zanda Basin	China	A twisted-horned antelope.	
Hispanomeryx linxiaensis	Sp. nov		Aiglstorfer et al.	Miocene	Linxia Basin	China	A member of the family Moschidae.	
Lophiomeryx triangularis	Sp. nov	Valid	Wang, Wang & Zhang	Oligocene		China	A member of Tragulina belonging to the family Lophiomerycidae.	
"Micromeryx" caoi	Sp. nov		Aiglstorfer et al.	Miocene	Linxia Basin	China	A member of the family Moschidae.	
Obotherium	Gen. et sp. nov		Bai et al.	Eocene	Irdin Manha Formation	China	A member of the family Tapirulidae. The type species is O. parvum, also includes new species O. tongi.	
Ovis gracilis	Sp. nov	Valid	Vislobokova	Pleistocene		Crimea	A species of Ovis.	
Paracamelus qiui	Sp. nov	Valid	Liu, Hou & Zhang	Miocene	Yushe Basin	China; Russia; Ukraine		
Stevenscamelus	Gen. et comb. nov	Valid	Prothero, Beatty & Marriott	Eocene (Chadronian)		United States (Texas)	A member of the family Camelidae belonging to the subfamily Floridatragulinae. The type species is "Poebrotherium" franki Wilson (1974).	
Tapiruloides	Gen. et sp. nov		Bai et al.	Eocene	Shara Murun Formation	China	A member of the family Tapirulidae. The type species is T. usuensis.	
Tavridia	Gen. et sp. nov	Valid	Vislobokova	Pleistocene		Crimea	A member of the tribe Antilopini. The type species is T. gromovi.	
Tragoportax perses	Sp. nov	Valid	Orak, Kostopoulos & Ataabadi	Miocene		Iran	A member of the family Bovidae belonging to the subfamily Bovinae and the tribe Tragoportacini.	
Turcocerus africanus	Sp. nov		Geraads, McCrossin & Benefit	Miocene		Kenya	A bovid.	
Umbrotherium engesserii	Sp. nov	Valid	Pandolfi & Rook	Miocene (Turolian)		Italy	A member of the family Giraffidae.	
Ustatochoerus tedfordi	Sp. nov	Valid	Skeels Stevens et al.	Hemingfordian	Runningwater Formation	United States (Nebraska)	An oreodont.	

===== Other artiodactyl research =====
- Evidence indicating that the turnover of European even-toed ungulates during the Eocene-Oligocene transition was more likely caused by environmental changes than by competition between endemic and immigrant ungulates is presented by Weppe et al. (2023).
- Watmore et al. (2023) revise the systematics of the late Eocene "oreonetine" oreodonts, interpreting Oreonetinae as a paraphyletic group and reinterpreting Limnenetes as a leptauchenine.
- A new specimen of Camelops hesternus is described from the Late Pleistocene sediments of the Cerro Grande de la Mesa Calderón monogenetic volcano (Valsequillo Basin, Mexico) by Carbot-Chanona et al. (2023), who determine the studied specimen to have a browsing diet, and estimate low population density of C. hesternus in the Valsequillo Basin.
- Tsubamoto, Kunimatsu & Nakatsukasa (2023) describe fossil material of Cainochoerus from the Miocene Nakali Formation (Kenya), representing the oldest record of the genus reported to date.
- Wimberly (2023) determines which skeletal proxies are the best predictors of body mass in extant ruminants, and estimates the body mass of Cosoryx furcatus, Aletomeryx sp. and Bison antiquus.
- New information on the anatomy of the skull of Hypisodus minimus is provided by Keppeler et al. (2023).
- Solounias & Jukar (2023) report new occurrences of Vishnutherium iravadicum, Honanotherium, Birgerbolhinia schaubi and Bramatherium sp. from the Vallesian and Turolian faunas of the Siwaliks, Pikermi, Samos and Maragheh, and re-classify "Giraffa" priscilla as Vishnutherium priscillium.
- Avilla, Román-Carrión & Rotti (2023) reinterpret the fossil material of Agalmaceros and Charitoceros as remains of the white-tailed deer, and consider the thorns of the antlers characterizing Agalmaceros and Charitoceros to be the symptom of a pathology that also affects extant deers.
- Uzunidis et al. (2023) describe fossil material of the Irish elk from the Teixoneres Cave, representing the first record of this species from the late Pleistocene of the eastern Iberian Peninsula, and interpret the fossil record of the Irish elk from the Iberian Peninsula in general to be indicative of rare incursions during the colder periods associated with a drop in sea level making it possible to bypass the Pyrenees, and indicative of differences in diets of Iberian individuals and Northern European individuals.
- Evidence from the study of pollen preserved with of an Irish elk specimen from the Marker Wadden (the Netherlands) living during the early Eemian or during an early Weichselian interstadial, interpret as indicating that the studied specimen foraged in a savannah-like landscape with a semi-arid climate, dominated by closed, mainly tall-herb vegetation, is presented by van der Knaap et al. (2023).
- Mecozzi, Sardella & Breda (2023) review fossil material of fallow deers from the late Early Pleistocene to the late Middle Pleistocene sites in Italy, and report that, in addition to the antler characters, morphological features of skull and teeth (especially of the lower teeth) might be useful for the distinction among different fallow deer taxa.
- Klein et al. (2023) describe partial bony labyrinth of a fetus of Miotragocerus pannoniae from the Miocene locality Höwenegg (Baden-Württemberg, Germany) and compare it with bony labyrinths of adult specimens from the same locality, providing the first information on the growth and ontogenetic variation of this structure in a fossil bovid.
- Description of new fossil material of Miotragocerus gregarius from the Linxia Basin and Fugu County (China) and a study on the affinities of this bovid is published by Shi & Zhang (2023).
- New fossil material of Neotragocerus is described from the Hemphillian Fort Rock Formation (Oregon, United States) by Martin & Mead (2023), who interpret the anatomy of members of this genus as indicative of boselaphine affinities, retain N. improvisus as a valid species, and consider N. lindgreni to be a nomen dubium.
- A study on the population dynamics of bisons from the Northern Great Plains, based on data from mitochondrial genomes from remains with the age ranging from 12,226 to 167 calibrated years before present, is published by Ovchinnikov & McCann (2023), who report evidence of two-fold population increase immediately following the Last Glacial Maximum, evidence indicating that the population of bisons was stable for at least 4000 years in the mid and late Holocene, and evidence of continuous population decline starting 2700 years ago.
- Kostopoulos, Sevim Erol & Mayda (2023) describe fossil material of "ovibovin" bovids from the Miocene of Çorakyerler (Turkey), providing evidence of the co-occurrence of two "ovibovins" (Criotherium argalioides and Hezhengia? cf. inundata) of similar size in the same assemblage; the authors also tentatively refer "Plesiaddax" simplex from Kayadibi (Turkey) to the genus Hezhengia.
- Kostopoulos & Merceron (2023) describe new fossil material of Procobus from the Dytiko-1 fossil site in Axios Valley (Greece), and interpret Procobus as a member of pan-Caprini.
- A study on the paleoecology of Rusingoryx atopocranion, as inferred from stable strontium and carbon isotope data from molars, is published by O'Brien et al. (2023), who interpret their findings as indicative of migratory behavior of R. atopocranion, comparable to that of extant wildebeest.
- Description of the fossil material of bovids from the Palan-Tyukan site (Azerbaijan) is published by Titov, Iltsevich & Sablin (2023), who interpret the composition of the studied assemblage as indicative of the presence of savanna-like forest-steppe landscapes in the studied area during the Early Pleistocene.
- A study on the auditory region morphology of extant and extinct members of Hippopotamoidea, and on its implications for putative aquatic affinities of fossil hippopotamoids, is published by Orliac et al. (2023), who interpret their findings as indicative of independent acquisitions of semiaquatic behaviour in hippopotamids and cetaceans.
- Jiménez-Hidalgo & Carbot-Chanona (2023) describe fossil material of an anthracothere belonging to the genus Arretotherium from the Oligocene Iniyoo Local Fauna (Oaxaca) and from the Miocene of Simojovel de Allende (Chiapas), representing the first records of anthracotheres in Mexico reported to date and the southernmost records of Arretotherium in North America during the Oligocene and the early Miocene.
- Description of new fossil material of Parabrachyodus hyopotamoides from the Miocene deposits from Samane Nala (Bugti Hills, Pakistan) and a study on the affinities of this anthracothere is published by Gernelle et al. (2023).
- A study on the affinities of "Hippopotamus" pantanellii is published by Martino et al. (2023), who transfer this species to the genus Archaeopotamus.
- Revision of the Early Pleistocene hippopotamid material from Buia (Eritrea) is published by Pandolfi et al. (2023), who report the presence of two hippopotamid species at Buia (Hippopotamus gorgops and aff. Hippopotamus karumensis, the latter representing the northernmost and one of the youngest occurrences of the species in Africa), and provide new characters for taxonomic discrimination between the two taxa.
- A study on the histology of ribs of extinct Pleistocene Hippopotamus species from Cyprus and Greece, providing evidence of increased density of osteocyte lacunae in the Cyprus dwarf hippopotamus compared to Hippopotamus creutzburgi and Hippopotamus antiquus, is published by Miszkiewicz et al. (2023), who interpret their findings as likely signifying bone remodelling in insular hippopotamids related to reduction of their body size.
- Mecozzi et al. (2023) revise the skull of a hippopotamid from the Tor di Quinto area (Italy), interpreting it as fossil material of the extant hippopotamus found in the strata of the Cava Montanari with an age spanning between 560,000 and 460,000 years, representing the earliest confirmed record of the hippopotamus in Europe.
- Description of new fossil material and a study on the affinities of Gujaratia indica is published by Rautela & Bajpai (2023), who find Gujaratia to be related to the North American diacodexeids and Diacodexis gigasei and D. morrisi from Europe, while finding raoellids and pakicetids to be closer to European dichobunoids such as D. morrisi than to Gujaratia.

=== Carnivorans ===
Name	Novelty	Status	Authors	Age	Type locality	Country	Notes	Images
Amphimachairodus hezhengensis	Sp. nov		Jiangzuo et al.	Miocene	Linxia Basin	China		
Cyonasua zettii	Sp. nov		Hontecillas et al.	Miocene	Cerro Azul Formation	Argentina	A member of the family Procyonidae.	
Dinofelis werdelini	Sp. nov		Jiangzuo et al.	Pliocene (Zanclean)	Varswater Formation	South Africa		
Eirictis zhangi	Sp. nov		Farjand et al.	Pleistocene	Yuanmou Formation	China	A member of the family Mustelidae belonging to the tribe Lyncodontini.	
Eoarctos	Gen. et sp. nov	Valid	Wang et al.	Oligocene	Brule Formation	United States (North Dakota)	A member of Ursoidea belonging to the family Subparictidae. The type species is E. vorax.	
Huracan	Gen. et comb. et sp. nov	Valid	Jiangzuo et al.	Miocene, Pliocene, possibly earliest Pleistocene		China; Spain; United States; Pakistan?	A bear belonging to the tribe Agriotheriini. The type species is "Agriotherium" schneideri Sellards (1916); genus also includes new species H. qiui from East Asia, as well as "Agriotherium" coffeyi Dalquest (1986) from North America, "Agriotherium" roblesi Morales & Aguirre (1976) from Europe and possibly "Hyaenarctos" punjabiensis Lydekker (1884) from South Asia.	
Lokotunjailurus chinsamyae	Sp. nov		Jiangzuo et al.	Pliocene (Zanclean)	Varswater Formation	South Africa		
Lonchocyon	Gen. et sp. nov	Valid	Zhang, Bai & Wang	Eocene	Baron Sog Formation	China	A member of Arctoidea of uncertain affinities, possibly an early offshoot of amphicyonids or hemicyonines. The type species is L. qiui.	
Nyctereutes peii	Sp. nov	Valid	Jiang et al.	Pleistocene		China	A species of Nyctereutes.	
Pachypanthera	Gen. et sp. nov		De Bonis et al.	Miocene		Thailand	A pantherine felid. The type species is P. piriyai.	
Palaeopanthera	Gen. et comb. nov	Valid	Hemmer	Miocene and Pliocene		China; Turkey	A felid with affinities to members of the genus Neofelis. Genus includes "Panthera" blytheae Tseng et al. (2014) and "Felis" pamiri Ozansoy.	
Panthera gombaszoegensis jinpuensis	Ssp. nov	Valid	Jiangzuo et al.	Middle Pleistocene		China	Announced in 2022; the final article version was published in 2023.	
Pinnarctidion iverseni	Sp. nov		Everett, Deméré & Wyss	Oligocene	Pysht Formation	United States (Washington)	A basal pinnipediform.	

==== Carnivoran research ====
- Morlo et al. (2023) describe amphicyonid fossil material from the Miocene site Napudet (Emunyan Beds; Kenya), including a molar of a large-bodied amphicyonid, interpreted as likely distinct from Cynelos jitu and probably belonging to the genus Myacyon.
- Varajão de Latorre (2023) compares the bacula of five species of borophagine canids with those of extant canids, and interprets their anatomy as indicating that borophagines had long copulatory durations and spontaneous ovulation, similar to those occurring in extant canines.
- A study on the morphology of the frontal sinuses of Eucyon adoxus, E. davisi and E. monticinensis is published by Frosali et al. (2023), who report that E. adoxus had frontal sinuses with adaptations to high stresses during feeding similar to adaptations present in hypercarnivorous canids that cooperatively hunt large prey, in spite of its overall craniodental morphology being suggestive of feeding on small prey.
- Partial left hindlimb assigned to cf. Aenocyon dirus is reported from the Upper Pleistocene deposits from the QM38 site in Quebrada Maní (Pampa del Tamarugal basin, Atacama Desert, northern Chile) by Caro et al. (2023), representing the only large predator in its ecosystem reported to date.
- Reynolds et al. (2023) confirm the identification of the dentary of a dire wolf reported from the Surprise Bluff locality in the Medicine Hat Buried Valley system (Alberta, Canada), representing the northernmost known occurrence of the species in North America.
- Martínez-Navarro et al. (2023) report the discovery of Early Pleistocene fossil material of the Ethiopian wolf from the Melka Wakena site-complex (Ethiopia), representing the first appearance of this species in the fossil record reported to date.
- Revision of the systematics of large canids from the Pleistocene of South America is published by Prevosti (2023), who synonymizes Protocyon orcesi with Protocyon troglodytes and Canis nehringi with Aenocyon dirus, transfers "Theriodictis" tarijensis to the genus Protocyon, and excludes "Canis" gezi from the genus Canis.
- A study on the brain anatomy and likely foraging ecology of Potamotherium is published by Lyras et al. (2023), who interpret their findings as indicating that Potamotherium likely relied on its whiskers to sense its environment when foraging.
- A study on the ecomorphology of percrocutoids, as inferred from postcanine teeth, is published by Pérez-Claros (2023).
- A study on the ecomorphology of Ictitherium viverrinum and Hyaenictitherium wongii is published by Kargopoulos et al. (2023), who consider both species to occupy a niche similar to that of extant coyote and to be likely engaged in interspecific competition.
- Evidence indicating that machairodontines were an exception to the general tendency of the smaller-sized members of groups of closely related species to have proportionally shorter rostra and larger braincases is presented by Tamagnini et al. (2023).
- A study on the elbow joint of Miracinonyx trumani is published by Figueirido et al. (2023), who find that M. trumani had an elbow morphology intermediate to that of extant cougar and extant cheetah, and argue that M. trumani was not as specialized as the cheetah for deploying a predatory behaviour based on fast running.
- A study on the mandible size variability in Panthera spelaea from the Pleistocene of Northern Eurasia is published by Puzachenko & Baryshnikov (2023), who interpret their findings as confirming the presence of sexual size dimorphism in cave lions, and supporting the subspecies status of the Beringian lion (Panthera spelaea vereshchagini).
- Purported large-bodied lion skull reported from the Pleistocene Natodomeri site (Kenya) is argued by Sherani & Sherani (2023) to have affinities with Panthera spelaea fossilis.
- A study on the evolutionary history of the tiger, as indicated by genomic data from ancient or historical (100–10,000 years old) specimens collected across mainland Asia, is published by Sun et al. (2023), who interpret their findings as indicating that Southwest China was a Late Pleistocene refugium for a relic basal tiger lineage, as well as indicative of a post-glaciation admixture of divergent lineages of South China tigers which took place in Eastern China.
- Deutsch et al. (2023) compare the hyoid elements of specimens of Smilodon fatalis and Panthera atrox from the La Brea Tar Pits with those of extant felids, and argue that the vocalizations P. atrox likely resembled those of extant pantherines, including having the ability to roar, while the vocalizations of S. fatalis are harder to determine, possibly more similar to that of purring cats than roaring cats, but produced at a lower frequency.
- Gross et al. (2023) describe coprolites from the Miocene Gratkorn site (Austria), interpreted as likely produced by members of the genera Protictitherium and Albanosmilus, and suggesting that Protictitherium mostly fed on small vertebrates, while Albanosmilus was a hypercarnivore.
- A study on the diversity of the Vallesian carnivorans from the Catalan locality of Can Llobateres 1, providing evidence of a major influx of carnivorans during the early Vallesian and evidence of the collapse of the studied fauna during the mid-Vallesian turnover, is published by Madern et al. (2023).
- Sianis et al. (2023) describe an assemblage of Early Pleistocene carnivorans from the Karnezeika locality (Greece), including new fossil material of the mustelid Baranogale helbingi, and providing evidence of the presence of Pachycrocuta brevirostris in southeastern Europe before the Olduvai subchron, similarly to western Europe.
- One of the richest (in terms of both specimens and number of species) carnivoran assemblages from the Early Pleistocene of Europe reported to date is described from the Grăunceanu site (Romania) by Werdelin et al. (2023).
- Schmökel, Farrell & Balisi (2023) report evidence of high prevalence of subchondral defects resembling osteochondritis dissecans in the femoral and humeral joint surfaces of specimens of Aenocyon dirus and Smilodon fatalis from the La Brea Tar Pits.

=== Chiropterans ===
Name	Novelty	Status	Authors	Age	Type locality	Country	Notes	Images
Americanycteris	Gen. et sp. nov	Valid	Morgan et al.	Miocene (Arikareean and Hemingfordian)	Cucaracha Formation	Panama	A leaf-nosed bat. The type species is A. cyrtodon.	
Eptesicus nilssonii varangus	Ssp. nov	Valid	Lopatin	Early Pleistocene		Crimea	A subspecies of the northern bat.	
Floridopteryx	Gen. et sp. nov	Valid	Morgan & Czaplewski	Miocene (Hemingfordian)		United States (Florida)	A member of the family Emballonuridae. The type species is F. poyeri.	
Icaronycteris gunnelli	Sp. nov		Rietbergen et al.	Wasatchian	Green River Formation	United States (Wyoming)		
Karstopteryx	Gen. et sp. nov	Valid	Morgan & Czaplewski	Oligocene (Arikareean)		United States (Florida)	A member of the family Emballonuridae. The type species is K. gunnelli.	
Oligopteryx	Gen. et 2 sp. nov	Valid	Morgan & Czaplewski	Oligocene (Whitneyan to Arikareean)		United States (Florida)	A member of the family Emballonuridae. The type species is O. floridanus; genus also includes O. hamaxitos.	
Rhinolophus mehelyi scythotauricus	Ssp. nov	Valid	Lopatin	Early Pleistocene		Crimea	A subspecies of Mehely's horseshoe bat.	
Vielasia	Gen. et sp. nov	Valid	Hand et al.	Eocene (Ypresian)	Quercy Phosphorites Formation	France	An early bat. The type species is V. sigei.	
Xenorhinos bhatnagari	Sp. nov	Valid	Hand et al.	Miocene	Riversleigh World Heritage Area	Australia	A member of the family Rhinonycteridae.	

==== Chiropteran research ====
- Fossil material of three taxa of bats (Antrozous cf. pallidus, a mouse-eared bat and a free-tailed bat approximately the size of the extant big free-tailed bat) is reported from the Miocene (Clarendonian) Ogallala Formation (Oklahoma, United States) by Czaplewski & Smith (2023), representing the only pre-Quaternary bats from Oklahoma reported to date.
- The first skull material of Eptesicus praeglacialis is described from the Lower Pleistocene deposits of the Taurida cave (Crimea) by Lopatin (2023).

=== Eulipotyphlans ===
Name	Novelty	Status	Authors	Age	Type locality	Country	Notes	Images
Ceutholestes acerbus	Sp. nov	Valid	Jones & Beard	Paleocene (Clarkforkian)		United States (Wyoming)	A member of the family Nyctitheriidae.	
Mystipterus austinae	Sp. nov	Valid	Korth, Boyd & Emry	Oligocene (Whitneyan)	Brule Formation	United States (North Dakota)	A member of the family Talpidae.	
Plagioctenodon dawsonae	Sp. nov	Valid	Jones & Beard	Paleocene (Clarkforkian)		United States (Wyoming)	A member of the family Nyctitheriidae.	
Plagioctenodon goliath	Sp. nov	Valid	Jones & Beard	Paleocene (Clarkforkian)		United States (Wyoming)	A member of the family Nyctitheriidae.	
Plagioctenoides cryptos	Sp. nov	Valid	Jones & Beard	Paleocene (Clarkforkian)		United States (Wyoming)	A member of the family Nyctitheriidae.	

==== Eulipotyphlan research ====
- Revision of the erinaceid and dimylid material from the late Miocene localities in Slovakia, including the first description of the deciduous premolars of Lantanotherium, is published by Cailleux, van den Hoek Ostende & Joniak (2023).
- Systematic revision of the Cuban species belonging to the genus Nesophontes is published by Orihuela León (2023).

=== Perissodactyls ===
Name	Novelty	Status	Authors	Age	Type locality	Country	Notes	Images
Aprotodon qiui	Sp. nov		Sun et al.	Miocene	Zhang'enbao Formation	China	A rhinoceros.	
Diceratherium marriottae	Sp. nov	Valid	Santos, Prothero & Welsh	Oligocene (Arikareean)	Sharps Formation	United States (South Dakota)	A rhinoceros.	
Eggysodon lingwuensis	Sp. nov		Lu et al.	Oligocene		China		
Idiodontherium	Gen. et 2 sp. nov		Perales-Gogenola et al.	Eocene		Spain	A member of the family Palaeotheriidae. Genus includes I. martindejesusi and I. astibiai.	
Parvorhinus	Gen et. comb. nov	In press	Pandolfi & Martino	Miocene		Germany	A rhinoceros. The type species is "Dicerorhinus" steinheimensis.	
Prosantorhinus yei	Sp. nov	Valid	Sun, Deng & Wang	Miocene	Zhang'enbao Formation	China	A rhinoceros belonging to the tribe Teleoceratini.	
Shansirhinus dengi	Sp. nov	Valid	Lu et al.	Miocene		China	A rhinoceros.	
Tongxinotherium	Gen. et sp. nov	Valid	Sun et al.	Miocene	Zhang'enbao Formation	China	An elasmothere rhinoceros. The type species is T. latirhinum.	

==== Perissodactyl research ====
- Kampouridis, Rățoi & Ursachi (2023) describe new chalicothere material from the Miocene Pogana 1 locality (Romania), and identify the locality as one of the few confirmed cases of the cooccurrence of schizotheriine and chalicotheriine chalicotheres.
- Pandolfi et al. (2023) describe new fossil material of Tapirus arvernensis from the Pliocene locality of Camp dels Ninots (Spain) and interpret T. arvernensis as a close relative of the Malayan tapir.
- Description of a new skull of Zaisanamynodon borisovi from the Eocene Aksyir Svita (Kazakhstan) and a new skull of Metamynodon planifrons from the Oligocene Brule Formation (South Dakota, United States), as well as a study on the phylogenetic relationships of amynodontids, is published by Veine-Tonizzo et al. (2023).
- A study on the phylogenetic relationships of rhinoceroses belonging to the group Aceratheriinae is published by Lu, Deng & Pandolfi (2023).
- A study on the reproductive strategy of Plesiaceratherium gracile is published by Lu et al. (2023), who report evidence of singleton pregnancy, suckling for 2–3 years and sexual maturity by approximately 5 years of age, and postulate that the evolution of litter size in odd-toed ungulates is determined by singleton pregnancy since the Eocene.
- Revision of the chilothere aceratheriine taxa from the Upper Miocene of Samos (Greece), supporting the validity of Chilotherium schlosseri and Eochilotherium samium as well as their separation on a generic level, is published by Kampouridis et al. (2023).
- Redescription of "Dicerorhinus" cixianensis is published by Li & Deng (2023), who transfer this species to the genus Lartetotherium.
- A skull of a rhinoceros is described from the late Neogene Qin Basin (Shanxi, China) by Shi et al. (2023), who assign this skull to the species Dihoplus ringstroemi, and confirm that D. ringstroemi was a distinct species.
- Belyaev et al. (2023) report the discovery of the nasal horn of a woolly rhinoceros from the permafrost of Sakha (Russia), with the shape of the base corresponding well to the shape of the nasal rugosity area, and argue that the narrower shape of the horn base in the previously found specimens was associated with damage after burial.
- Yuan et al. (2023) generate four mitogenomes from Late Pleistocene woolly rhinoceros from Northern China, report evidence of higher genetic diversity of Chinese woolly rhinoceros compared to Siberian ones, and report that one of the studied samples represent a lineage that diverged close to the timing of the first appearance of the species, where the other three samples represent a lineage also known from the Wrangel Island (Russia).
- Seeber et al. (2023) use genomic data from cave hyena coprolites from Middle Palaeolithic layers in Bockstein-Loch and Hohlenstein-Stadel caves (Germany) to assemble the first European woolly rhinoceros mitogenomes, and interpret the studied mitogenomes as genetically distinct from those of the Siberian woolly rhinoceros, and possibly indicative of a split of the populations coinciding with the earliest records of woolly rhinoceros in Europe.
- A study on the phylogenetic relationships of Eurasian Quaternary rhinoceroses is published by Pandolfi (2023).
- Revision of the fossil material of early Eocene hippomorphs from the Paris Barin (France) is published by Bronnert & Métais (2023), who provide evidence of differences between the faunas of Southern and Northern Europe at the very beginning of the Eocene, as well as evidence of homogenization of these faunas and evidence of faunal turnover between the sites close to MP7 and those close to MP8-9.
- A study on the evolution of body size in brontotheres is published by Sanisidro, Mihlbachler & Cantalapiedra (2023), who interpret their findings as indicative of higher survival of larger lineages resulting from reduced competition with other herbivores.
- Evidence indicating that Miocene hipparions from Maragheh (Iran) were either grass-dominated mixed feeders or grazers is presented by Niknahad et al. (2023).
- Description of new fossil material of hipparionines from the late Miocene to early Pliocene deposits of the Haritalyangar area (Himachal Pradesh, India), including the first record of Proboscidipparion from the Siwaliks, is published by Sankhyan et al. (2023).
- A study on the Hipparion tracks from the Laetoli site (Tanzania), and on their implications for the knowledge of digit loss in the evolutionary history of horses, is published by Vincelette et al. (2023), who find no evidence that distal portions of the accessory digits are retained in the feet of modern horses, argue that absence of frog impressions in Laetoli trackways does not prove the absence of a frog by itself, and report evidence of the presence of frog impressions in other footprints of tridactyl equids.
- Revision of the Pliocene and Early Pleistocene hipparionin equid species from western Eurasia is published by Cirilli et al. (2023).
- Singh et al. (2023) describe fossil material of a horse from the Upper Siwaliks of India, and interpret its anatomy as consistent with that of Equus sivalensis, extending the temporal distribution of this species into the latest Pliocene.
- Revision of Equus major, based on data from fossil material from the Early Pleistocene sites Pardines and Senèze (France), is published by Cirilli, Saarinen & Bernor (2023), who interpret E. major as larger than any other Early Pleistocene Eurasian species belonging to the genus Equus, comparable in size with Equus suessenbornensis, with a browse-dominated to mixed-feeding diet.

=== Other laurasiatherians ===
Name	Novelty	Status	Authors	Age	Type locality	Country	Notes	Images
Berracotherium	Gen. et sp. nov	Valid	Fernández et al.	Middle Eocene-early Oligocene	Quebrada de Los Colorados Formation	Argentina	A member of Pyrotheria belonging to the family Pyrotheriidae. The type species is B. koimeterion.	
Hapalodectes paradux	Sp. nov		Lopatin	Paleocene	Naran Bulak Formation	Mongolia	A mesonychian belonging to the family Hapalodectidae	
Maocyon	Gen. et sp. nov		Averianov et al.	Eocene	Youganwo Formation	China	A hyaenodont belonging to the family Hyainailouridae. The type species is M. peregrinus.	
Micrauchenia	Gen. et sp. nov	Valid	Püschel et al.	Late Miocene	Bahía Inglesa Formation	Chile	A member of Litopterna belonging to the family Macraucheniidae. The type species is M. saladensis.	
Pachyrukhos ngenwinkul	Sp. nov	Valid	Solórzano et al.	Miocene (Santacrucian)	Cura-Mallín Group	Chile	A notoungulate belonging to the family Hegetotheriidae and the subfamily Pachyrukhinae.	
Pascualhyrax	Gen. et sp. nov	Valid	Ferro et al.	Eocene (Bartonian)	Quebrada de los Colorados Formation	Argentina	An "archaeohyracid" typotherian notoungulate. Genus includes new species P. irqi.	
Prodissopsalis jimenezi	Sp. nov	Valid	Salesa et al.	Eocene (Bartonian)	Mazaterón Formation	Spain	A hyaenodont belonging to the family Hyaenodontidae.	
Promylophis	Gen. et sp. nov		Shockey et al.	Oligocene (Deseadan)	Salla Beds	Bolivia	A member of Litopterna belonging to the family Proterotheriidae. The type species is P. cifellii.	

==== Miscellaneous laurasiatherian research ====
- Carrillo et al. (2023) describe new fossil material of Megadolodus molariformis and Neodolodus colombianus from La Victoria and Villavieja formations (Colombia) and study the phylogenetic affinities of Megadolodus and Neodolodus, recovering them as closely related within the litopternan family Proterotheriidae.
- A study aiming to determine the optimal neck posture of Macrauchenia patachonica is published by Blanco, Yorio & Montenegro (2023).
- The first description of the atlas of Macrauchenia patachonica is published by Püschel & Martinelli (2023).
- Nelson, Engelman & Croft (2023) provide new estimates of body mass of 10 species of notoungulates.
- Revision of the fossil material and the systematic status of Peripantostylops and Othnielmarshia is published by Vera & Mones (2023).
- Systematic revisions of the species belonging to the genus Protypotherium are published by Fernández, Fernicola & Cerdeño (2023).
- Systematic revision of the genera Icochilus and Interatherium is published by Fernández, Fernicola & Cerdeño (2023), who consider Icochilus to be a junior synonym of Interatherium, conclude that the genus Interatherium comprises the species I. rodens and I. extensus with wide geographic and temporal distribution, and find that the Santa Cruz Formation cannot be subdivided based on the presence or absence of any species of Interatherium.
- A study on the phylogenetic relationships of mesotheriid notoungulates is published by Armella & Deforel (2023).
- A study on the bone histology of Caraguatypotherium munozi, providing evidence of inter-skeletal variation on bone growth rates and marked cyclical growth, is published by Campos-Medina et al. (2023).
- Fernández-Monescillo et al. (2023) interpret the anatomical variation observed in mesotheres from Monte Hermoso (Argentina) as consistent with ontogenetic and individual variation within a single species Pseudotypotherium exiguum.
- Redescription and a study on the affinities of Tegehotherium burmeisteri is published by Seoane, Cerdeño & Gaetano (2023), who name new clades Hemihegetotheriomorpha and Pachyrukhini.
- Revision of the litoptern and notoungulate fossil material from the Pampean Region of Argentina present in the Santiago Roth Collections housed in Geneva and Zurich, providing new information on the anatomy of Macrauchenia patachonica, is published by Carrillo & Püschel (2023).
- Vera & Reguero (2023) revise the fossil material of Paleogene South American native ungulates from the lower level of Cerro Pan de Azúcar (Argentina) collected by Santiago Roth in 1897, describe additional specimens from other historical collections from sites in the Chubut river valley, and reevalute the taxonomy of the species endemic to the Cerro Pan de Azúcar locality, interpreting Monolophodon minutum as a junior synonym of Henricosbornia lophodonta.
- Matsui & Pyenson (2023) describe a molar of a member of the genus Desmostylus from the Miocene (Aquitanian) Skooner Gulch Formation (California, United States), providing evidence that the specialized columnar teeth morphology of Desmostylus persisted for more than 15 million years.
- Bertrand et al. (2023) describe virtual endocasts of members of the genus Trogosus from the middle Eocene of North America, and report the presence of characteristics that could unite Tillodontia with Pantodonta and Arctocyonidae, probable adaptations to terrestrial lifestyle, and a relatively small neocortex which could have negatively impacted the abilities of Trogosus to compete with artiodactyls and avoid predation.
- Solé et al. (2023) reinstate Hyaenodictis as a genus distinct from Dissacus, and describe new fossil material of Hyaenodictis raslanloubatieri and H. rougierae from the Eocene (Ypresian) sites of La Borie and Palette (France), providing evidence that these mesonychids were digitigrade in posture and relatively cursorial in locomotion.
- Kort & Jones (2023) study the mobility of lumbar vertebrae of Patriofelis and Limnocyon, and interpret their findings as indicating that the revolute, interlocking zygapophyses of the studied vertebrae did not restrict dorsoventral flexion and extension of the spine, and their more likely function was to stabilize lumbar vertebrae against shear forces and disarticulation.

== Xenarthrans ==
=== Cingulatans ===
Name	Novelty	Status	Authors	Age	Type locality	Country	Notes	Images
Andinoglyptodon	Gen. et sp. nov		Salas-Gismondi et al.	Pliocene	El Descanso Formation	Peru	A glyptodont. The type species is A. mollohuancai.	
Plohophorus avellaneda	Sp. nov	Valid	Quiñones et al.	Latest Pliocene–earliest Pleistocene	El Polvorín Formation	Argentina	A glyptodont.	

==== Cingulatan research ====
- A study on the skull anatomy of specimens of Glyptodon, Doedicurus, Neosclerocalyptus and Panochthus from the Pampean Region of Argentina present in the Santiago Roth Collections housed in Europe is published by Christen, Sánchez-Villagra & Le Verger (2023), who evaluate the implications of the studied cranial characters to evolutionary hypotheses concerning relationships among Pleistocene glyptodonts.
- Troyelli et al. (2023) present the first digital reconstruction of the endocranial cavity of Propalaehoplophorus australis.
- Fossil material of Glyptotherium cylindricum representing the most complete Central American glyptodontine material reported to date is described from the latest Pleistocene of Guatemala by Cuadrelli et al. (2023).
- Barasoain et al. (2023) describe new fossil material of Epipeltephilus kanti from the Miocene Loma de Las Tapias Formation (Argentina), representing the youngest record of Peltephilidae reported to date.
- New collection of dasypodid osteoderms, identified as belonging to armadillos with strong affinities with taxa from Late Miocene localities in northwestern Argentina, is described from the Miocene Toro Negro Formation (La Rioja Province, Argentina) by Brandoni, Barasoain & González Ruiz (2023).
- A study on the shape variation of osteoderms of members of Dasypodini is published by Salgado-Ahumada et al. (2023), who interpret their findings as supporting the referral of disarticulated osteoderms from the Guanaco and Ituzaingó formations (Argentina) to the genus Dasypus, confirming its presence in the late Miocene.

=== Pilosans ===
==== Pilosan research ====
- A study on the dietary adaptations of Late Pleistocene and Early Holocene giant ground sloths belonging to the families Nothrotheriidae, Megatheridae, Mylodontidae and Megalonychidae is published by Dantas, Campbell & McDonald (2023).
- Evidence of niche differentiation between extinct giant sloths from the Late Pleistocene of the Brazilian Intertropical Region is presented by Santos, Mcdonald & Dantas (2023), who interpret megalonychids and nothrotheriids as mainly climbers, mylodontines as mainly diggers, and scelidotheres and megatheriids as strictly terrestrial.
- Varela et al. (2023) study the mandibles of fossil sloths, modeling the actions of the major muscles involved in mastication, and report that stress distribution and strain energy values differed between taxa predicted to be grazers and those predicted to be browsers; the authors also report findings indicating that sloths which had first tooth with a caniniform morphology did not use it for strenuous activities such as food processing.
- Miño-Boilini & Brandoni (2023) identify fossil material of a member of the genus Nematherium from the Honda Group (Colombia), extending known geographic range of members of this genus into the northern part of South America.
- Description of the skull anatomy of Schismotherium fractum is published by Gaudin et al. (2023), who confirm that S. fractum was a taxon distinct from Pelecyodon cristatus.
- Fossil material of a juvenile megalonychid, interpreted as likely belonging to the species Ahytherium aureum and bearing marks indicating that it was fed on (and possibly predated on) by a large felid, is described from the Engrunado cave (Bahia, Brazil) by da Costa et al. (2023).
- De Iuliis et al. (2023) consider Eucholoeops fronto and E. lafonei to be likely junior synonyms of Eucholoeops ingens, and consider Eucholoeops latifrons to be likely distinct from E. ingens.
- A well-preserved fetus of Nothrotherium maquinense is described from the Toca da Boa Vista cave (Brazil) by Pujos et al. (2023), who interpret the studied specimen as indicating that N. maquinense gave birth to a single offspring at a time, that the newborn was approximately one-third the length of its mother, and that the newborn was likely already capable of feeding on solid food after a short period of lactation.

=== General xenarthran research ===
- New estimates of the body mass of Catonyx cuvieri, Eremotherium laurillardi, Glyptotherium sp., Glossotherium phoenesis, Holmesina paulacoutoi, Nothrotherium maquinense, Ocnotherium giganteum, Pachyarmatherium brasiliense, Pampatherium humboldti and Valgipes bucklandi are presented by Barbosa et al. (2023).

== Other eutherians ==
Name	Novelty	Status	Authors	Age	Type locality	Country	Notes	Images
Aenigmictis	Gen. et sp. nov	Valid	Meehan & Korth	Uncertain, probably Eocene to Oligocene (Chadronian to Whitneyan)		United States (Nebraska)	A member of Leptictida. The type species is A. magnamolaris.	
Bayshinoryctes	Gen. et sp. nov		Lopatin & Averianov	Late Cretaceous (Turonian–Santonian)	Bayan Shireh Formation	Mongolia	A stem placental. The type species is B. shuvalovi.	
Didelphodus caloris	Sp. nov	Valid	Gingerich, Folie & Smith	Eocene (Wasatchian)		United States (Wyoming)	A member of the family Cimolestidae.	
Europotamogale	Gen. et sp. nov	Disputed	Crespo, Cruzado-Caballero, & Castillo	Pliocene		Spain	A placental of uncertain affinities. The type species is E. melkarti. Originally described as member of Afrosoricida; Furió, Minwer-Barakat & García-Alix (2024) reinterpreted its fossil material as remains of a water-mole of the genus Archaeodesmana, while Crespo & Castillo (2025) reaffirmed the validity of E. melkarti.	
Microtherulum	Gen. et sp. nov	Valid	Wang & Wang	Early Cretaceous	Jiufotang Formation	China	An early eutherian of uncertain affinities. The type species is M. oneirodes.	
Naranius hengdongensis	Sp. nov	Valid	Ting, Wang & Meng	Early Eocene	Lingcha Formation	China	A member of the family Cimolestidae.	
Sikuomys	Gen. et sp. nov	Valid	Eberle et al.	Late Cretaceous (Campanian)	Prince Creek Formation	United States (Alaska)	A eutherian related to Gypsonictops. The type species is S. mikros.	

=== Miscellaneous eutherian research ===
- Novacek, Hoffman & O'leary (2023) describe new fossil material of Asioryctes nemegtensis from the Upper Cretaceous Djadochta Formation (Mongolia), expanding known geographic and stratigraphic range of this species.

== Metatherians ==
Name	Novelty	Status	Authors	Age	Type locality	Country	Notes	Images
Acrobates magicus	Sp. nov	In press	Fabian et al.	Miocene	Riversleigh World Heritage Area	Australia	A relative of the feathertail glider.	
Acrobates pettitorum	Sp. nov	In press	Fabian et al.	Miocene	Riversleigh World Heritage Area	Australia	A relative of the feathertail glider.	
Ambulator	Gen. et comb. nov	Valid	Van Zoelen et al.	Pliocene	Tirari Formation	Australia	A member of the family Diprotodontidae. The type species is "Zygomaturus" keanei Stirton (1967).	
Archerus	Gen. et sp. nov	Valid	Myers & Crosby	Miocene	Riversleigh World Heritage Area	Australia	A member of the family Phalangeridae. The type species is A. johntoniae.	
Bohra planei	Sp. nov	Valid	Prideaux & Warburton	Pliocene	Otibanda Formation	Papua New Guinea		
Chunia faciaintermedius	Sp. nov		Case	Oligocene	Etadunna Formation	Australia	A member of the family Ektopodontidae.	
Chunia minkinensis	Sp. nov		Case	Oligocene	Etadunna Formation	Australia	A member of the family Ektopodontidae.	
Chunia pledgei	Sp. nov		Crichton et al.	Oligocene		Australia	A member of the family Ektopodontidae.	
Distoechurus georginae	Sp. nov	In press	Fabian et al.	Miocene	Riversleigh World Heritage Area	Australia	A relative of the feather-tailed possum.	
Distoechurus jeanesorum	Sp. nov	In press	Fabian et al.	Oligocene	Riversleigh World Heritage Area	Australia	A relative of the feather-tailed possum.	
Enigmaleo	Gen. et sp. nov		Gillespie	Early Miocene	Riversleigh World Heritage Area	Australia	A member of the family Thylacoleonidae. The type species is E. archeri.	
Eomicrobiotherium diluculum	Sp. nov		Chornogubsky et al.	Eocene	Las Flores Formation	Argentina	A member of the family Microbiotheriidae.	
Guggenheimia glykeia	Sp. nov		Chornogubsky et al.	Eocene	Las Flores Formation	Argentina	A member of Didelphimorphia belonging to the family Protodidelphidae.	
Lekaneleo myersi	Sp. nov		Gillespie	Middle Miocene	Riversleigh World Heritage Area	Australia	A member of the family Thylacoleonidae.	
Lumakoala	Gen. et sp. nov		Crichton et al.	Oligocene		Australia	Probably member of the family Phascolarctidae. The type species is L. blackae.	
Lutreolina tonnii	Sp. nov	Valid	Goin & de los Reyes	Pleistocene		Argentina	A species of Lutreolina.	
Malleodectes? wentworthi	Sp. nov		Churchill et al.	Miocene	Riversleigh World Heritage Area	Australia	A member of Dasyuromorphia belonging to the family Malleodectidae.	
Mukupirna fortidentata	Sp. nov		Crichton et al.	Oligocene		Australia	A member of the family Mukupirnidae.	
Nemolestes lagunafriensis	Sp. nov	Valid	Rangel et al.	Mid Eocene		Argentina	A member of Sparassodonta.	
Ngathachunia	Gen. et comb. nov		Case	Oligocene		Australia	A member of the family Ektopodontidae; a new genus for "Chunia" omega.	
Silvenator	Gen. et sp. nov		Rangel, Carneiro & Oliveira	Early Eocene	Itaboraí Basin	Brazil	A member of Sparassodonta. Genus includes "Nemolestes" brasiliensis Rangel et al. (2023).	
Urrayira	Gen. et sp. nov	Valid	Cramb et al.	Pleistocene (Chibanian)		Australia	A member of Dasyuromorphia belonging or related to the family Dasyuridae. The type species is U. whitei.	

=== Metatherian research ===
- A study on the ecomorphological diversity of the Late Cretaceous metatherians from North America, based on data from their teeth, is published by Brannick et al. (2023), who interpret their findings as indicative of a wide range of dietary niches in the studied metatherians, with moderately high and stable diversity of dental morphology and diets relative to other mammalian clades.
- A study on the affinities of metatherians from the Paleogene Itaboraí Basin (Brazil) is published by Carneiro & Oliveira (2023).
- Engelman & Croft (2023) redescribe partial skull of an unusual carnivorous metatherian from the Miocene-Pliocene Santa María Group (Catamarca Province, Argentina), representing the seventh carnivorous metatherian taxon from the late Cenozoic of northwestern Argentina, and interpret it as most likely representing a small-bodied sparassodont taxon.
- Guimarães et al. (2023) describe a large canine of a member of the family Proborhyaenidae from the Eocene Guabirotuba Formation (Brazil), representing the largest mammalian predator of the Guabirotuba Fauna reported to date and expanding known geographical range of proborhyaenids.
- Suarez et al. (2023) redescribe the skull of Anachlysictis gracilis and propose a new reconstruction of the external morphology of its head.
- A study on the skull and likely vision of Thylacosmilus atrox is published by Gaillard, MacPhee & Forasiepi (2023), who find that, while changes in the skull anatomy related to the growth of the canines of this sparassodont resulted in a divergent orbit orientation, frontation and verticality of the orbits compensated for their low convergence and made it possible to partially preserve binocularity.
- Gônet et al. (2023) present a model which can be used to determine posture from humeral parameters in extant mammals, and use it to infer a crouched posture for Peratherium cuvieri.
- Two new specimens of Orhaniyeia nauta, providing new information on the anatomy of this species and on the affinities of anatoliadelphyids, are described from the Eocene Uzunçarşıdere Formation (Turkey) by Beard et al. (2023).
- A study on the affinities of Estelestes ensis is published by Goin et al. (2023).
- New fossil material of didelphimorphian and paucituberculatan marsupials, including the first records of palaeothentines and abderitids from the Brazilian Amazonia, is described from the Miocene Solimões Formation by Stutz et al. (2023).
- A study on the bone histology of Nimbadon lavarackorum, providing evidence that this marsupial experienced cyclical growth rates and needed at least 7–8 years to reach skeletal maturity, is published by Chinsamy et al. (2023).
- Evidence from tooth microwear and stable isotope analysis of the fossil material of Nimbadon lavarackorum from the Riversleigh World Heritage Area, interpreted as indicative of a high proportion of fruit in the diet, is presented by DeSantis et al. (2023).
- A study on the diets of Pleistocene marsupial herbivores, inferred from calcium and strontium isotope compositions of fossils from Wellington Caves and the Bingara region (New South Wales, Australia), is published by Koutamanis et al. (2023), who interpret their findings as indicative of small home ranges and a diversity of dietary niches of the studied marsupials.

== Monotremes ==
Name	Novelty	Status	Authors	Age	Type locality	Country	Notes	Images
Patagorhynchus	Gen. et sp. nov	Valid	Chimento et al.	Late Cretaceous (Maastrichtian)	Chorrillo Formation	Argentina	The type species is P. pascuali.	

== Other mammals ==
Name	Novelty	Status	Authors	Age	Type locality	Country	Notes	Images
Mirusodens	Gen. et sp. nov	Valid	Mao et al.	Middle Jurassic (Bathonian–Callovian)		China	A member of Euharamiyida. The type species is M. caii.	
Spelaeomolitor	Gen. et sp. nov	Valid	Martin et al.	Early Cretaceous		Germany	A stem tribosphenidan mammal. The type species is S. speratus.	

=== Other mammalian research ===
- A study on the fossil material of eutriconodontans from the Early Cretaceous Teete vertebrate assemblage (Sakha, Russia), assigned to representatives of Sangarotherium aquilonium and two species of Gobiconodon (including the largest species of this genus known from Asia), is published by Averianov et al. (2023), who interpret the studied fossils as supporting the existence of a dispersal route from Asia to North America through Beringia in the Early Cretaceous.
- Han et al. (2023) describe entangled specimens of Repenomamus robustus and Psittacosaurus lujiatunensis from the Lujiatun Member of the Yixian Formation (China), and interpret the studied specimens as likely locked in combat as a result of the predation attempt on the part of the mammal.
- Description of the petrosal and inner ear morphology of a probable member of the genus Astroconodon from the Lower Cretaceous Cloverly Formation (Montana, United States) is published by Hoffmann et al. (2023).
- Krause & Hoffmann (2023) provisionally assign a caudal vertebra from the Anembalemba Member of the Upper Cretaceous Maevarano Formation (Madagascar) to Vintana sertichi, representing the first known postcranial material of this species.
- Won, So & Jon (2023) describe a partial skeleton of a multituberculate from the Lower Cretaceous Sinuiju Formation, representing the first finding of a Mesozoic mammal from North Korea reported to date.
- Luo & Martin (2023) describe new fossil material (mandibles and teeth) of Henkelotherium guimarotae, reporting evidence of late eruption of several molars after completion of replacement of antemolar teeth, possibly indicating longer-lived life or different life-history traits than in crown therians.

== General mammalian research ==
- A study on the masticatory muscle features of extant and extinct mammals is published by Ercoli et al. (2023), who find that early mammaliaforms and mammals had similar muscle proportions to those of living carnivores, and find similarities in the masticatory muscle features of rodents and derived extinct euungulates and diprotodonts.
- Martinez et al. (2023) find no evidence of a significant relation between the relative surface area of the maxilloturbinal and physiological traits such as metabolism and body temperature in extant mammals, and interpret their findings as challenging the hypothesis positing that respiratory turbinals reflect the thermal and metabolic physiology in extant and extinct tetrapods (especially in mammals).
- Claytor et al. (2023) describe new fossil material of mammals living within the first 80,000 years of the Paleocene from the Hell Creek region of northeastern Montana (United States), providing new information on the earliest phases of mammalian recovery after the Cretaceous–Paleogene extinction event.
- A study on the timing of the placental diversification, as inferred from genomic data, is published by Foley et al. (2023), who interpret their findings as indicative of diversification of placentals coinciding with the breakup of continental landmasses and rising sea levels in the Late Cretaceous, and a second pulse of diversification after the Cretaceous–Paleogene extinction event.
- Carlisle et al. (2023) estimate the timing of the origin of placental clades on the basis of the fossil record, arguing that Placentalia likely originated in the Late Cretaceous, but the majority of placental orders likely originated around or after the Cretaceous-Paleogene boundary, possibly during the Paleocene–Eocene Thermal Maximum.
- Benevento et al. (2023) study changes in species richness of terrestrial North American mammals throughout the Cretaceous and the Cenozoic, and interpret their findings as indicating that mammals of all body sizes, rather than only large-bodied ones, diversified substantially during the Cretaceous-Paleogene transition, and that increases in the diversity of small-bodied species were similar to those of larger ones.
- Friscia, Borths & Croft (2023) compare the evolutionary trajectories of sparassodonts and hyaenodonts, and find that both groups became increasingly carnivorous during the Cenozoic, but only in hyaenodonts this change corresponded with increase in body size.
- A study on the competition for prey between Miocene mammalian and reptilian predators at La Venta (Colombia) is published by Wilson & Parker (2023), who interpret their findings as indicative of limited competition for resources among the carnivore guild compared to the most similar extant communities, a dominant role of crocodyliform predators in the studied community, and low predation pressure which might have resulted in overpopulation leading to feeding stress in the notoungulate species Pericotoxodon platignathus.
- Evidence indicating that the greatest change in faunal composition of the mammalian assemblage from the Miocene Dove Spring Formation (California, United States) coincided with basin rotation and translation during the tectonic history of the studied geological formation is presented by Hardy & Badgley (2023).
- Revision of the fossil record of mammals from the Miocene to Pleistocene Salicas Formation (Argentina) is published by Ruiz-Ramoni et al. (2023).
- A study on biodiversity losses in large, eastern African mammalian herbivore fauna during the past 7.4 million years is published by Lauer et al. (2023), who report that large herbivore diversity losses occurring before the mid-Pleistocene were related to environmental changes and involved no significant threat to community ecological function, but the biodiversity losses that followed the interval of 1.9–1.7 million years ago threatened the assembly and function of large herbivore communities, which might have been related to the increase in the variability and aridity of eastern African climates.
- Evidence of gradual decrease in the abundance of large-sized mammals in the African fossil record over the past 4 million years is presented by Bibi & Cantalapiedra (2023).
- Evidence from stable carbon, nitrogen and sulfur isotope ratios of bone collagen of reindeers, bovids and horses from the Middle and Upper Paleolithic site of Les Cottés (France), interpreted as indicative of greater behavioural plasticity of Late Pleistocene reindeers compared to other studied ungulates (including significant consumption of lichen, probable larger total range and greater variability among reindeers themselves), is presented by Britton et al. (2023).
- Evidence from stable isotope composition of collagen and bioapatite of fossil bones of late Pleistocene mammals from the Arroyo del Vizcaíno site (Uruguay), interpreted as indicative of diverse dietary preferences of herbivores and supporting the existence of niche partitioning among closely related taxa, is presented by Varela et al. (2023).
- A study on the paleoecology of large mammals from the Pleistocene of southern Brazilian Pampa, providing evidence of the studied mammals living mostly in grassland environments with likely seasonal climate and feeding on mainly on cool-season grasses, is published by Carrasco et al. (2023).
- A study on the age of fossils of eight most common mammal species (coyotes and seven extinct species) from the La Brea Tar Pits (California, United States) is published by O'Keefe et al. (2023), who find that seven of the studied species disappeared before the onset of the Younger Dryas, that Paramylodon harlani and Camelops hesternus disappeared before the other five species, that the disappearances of Smilodon fatalis, Aenocyon dirus, Panthera atrox, Bison antiquus and Equus occidentalis were contemporaneous, and that the disappearances were likely primarily caused by large-scale fires, which in turn might have been caused by humans igniting fires in a warming and increasingly arid climate.
- A study on the population trajectories of members of extant terrestrial megafauna throughout the Quaternary, as indicated by genomic data, is published by Bergman et al. (2023), who find evidence of population declines in the majority of the studied species, and interpret the pattern of their decline as better explained by expansion Homo sapiens than by climate changes.
- Seeber et al. (2023) report the discovery of ancient environmental DNA of multiple mammoth and woolly rhinoceros individuals from recent lake sediments from the Yamal Peninsula (Russia), far from the time likely to host living individuals, and argue that physical processes, rather than presence of live organisms, are responsible for the recovery of the studied DNA.
