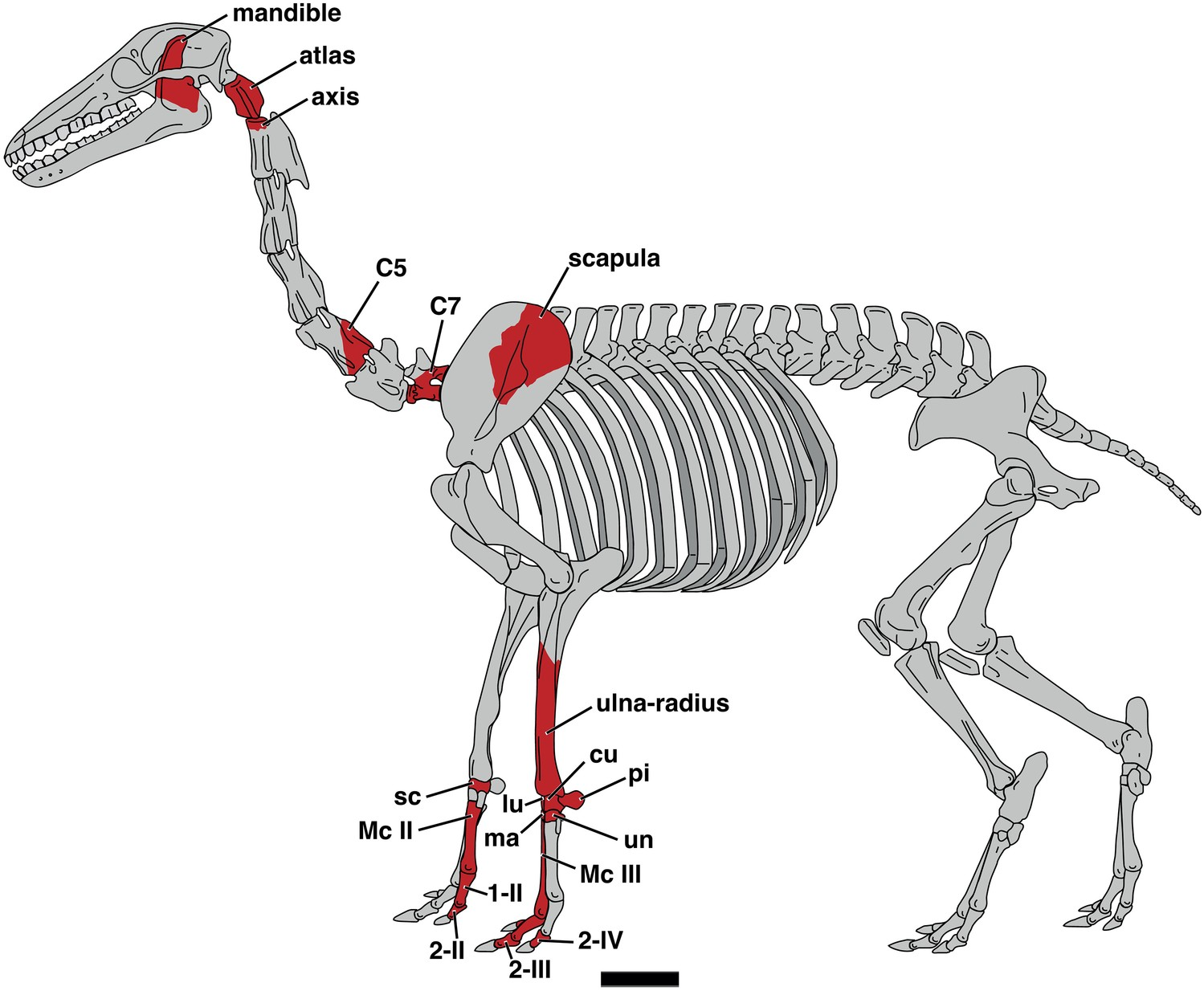
- Skeletal reconstruction of Micrauchenia saladensis

Scientific classification
- Kingdom: Animalia
- Phylum: Chordata
- Class: Mammalia
- Order: †Litopterna
- Family: †Macraucheniidae
- Subfamily: †Macraucheniinae
- Genus: †Micrauchenia; Püschel et al., 2023
- Species: †M. saladensis

Binomial name
- †Micrauchenia saladensis Püschel et al., 2023

= Micrauchenia =

Micrauchenia Temporal range: Late Miocene (Huayquerian) ~8–6 Ma

Extinct genus of litopterns

Micrauchenia is an extinct genus of macraucheniine litoptern that lived during the Late Miocene of what is now Chile. Fossils of this genus have been found in the Bahía Inglesa Formation in Chile.

== Discovery and naming ==
The holotype of this genus, SGO.PV.21700, was first discovered in 2005 in Quebrada Remolón, a creek with an outcrop of the Bahía Inglesa Formation, located in the Bahía Salado area, ~70 km south of Caldera, Atacama Region, Chile. The holotype consists of a lower mandible. The genus name, Micrauchenia, is derived from the Greek mikros, meaning "small", and auchen meaning "neck", in comparison to its larger relative Macrauchenia. The specific name refers to Bahía Salado, the locality in which the type specimen was found.

== Description ==
Micrauchenia was a small macruacheniid, similar in size to Cramauchenia normalis and Coniopternium andinum and smaller than Cullinia levis, which, prior to its description, was considered the smallest macraucheniine. Micrauchenia weighed up to 53–103 kg (117–227 lb). The robust metapodials are proportionally similar in terms of relative length and width to Theosodon, in contrast to Cullinia levis, in which they are proportionally more slender and elongated.

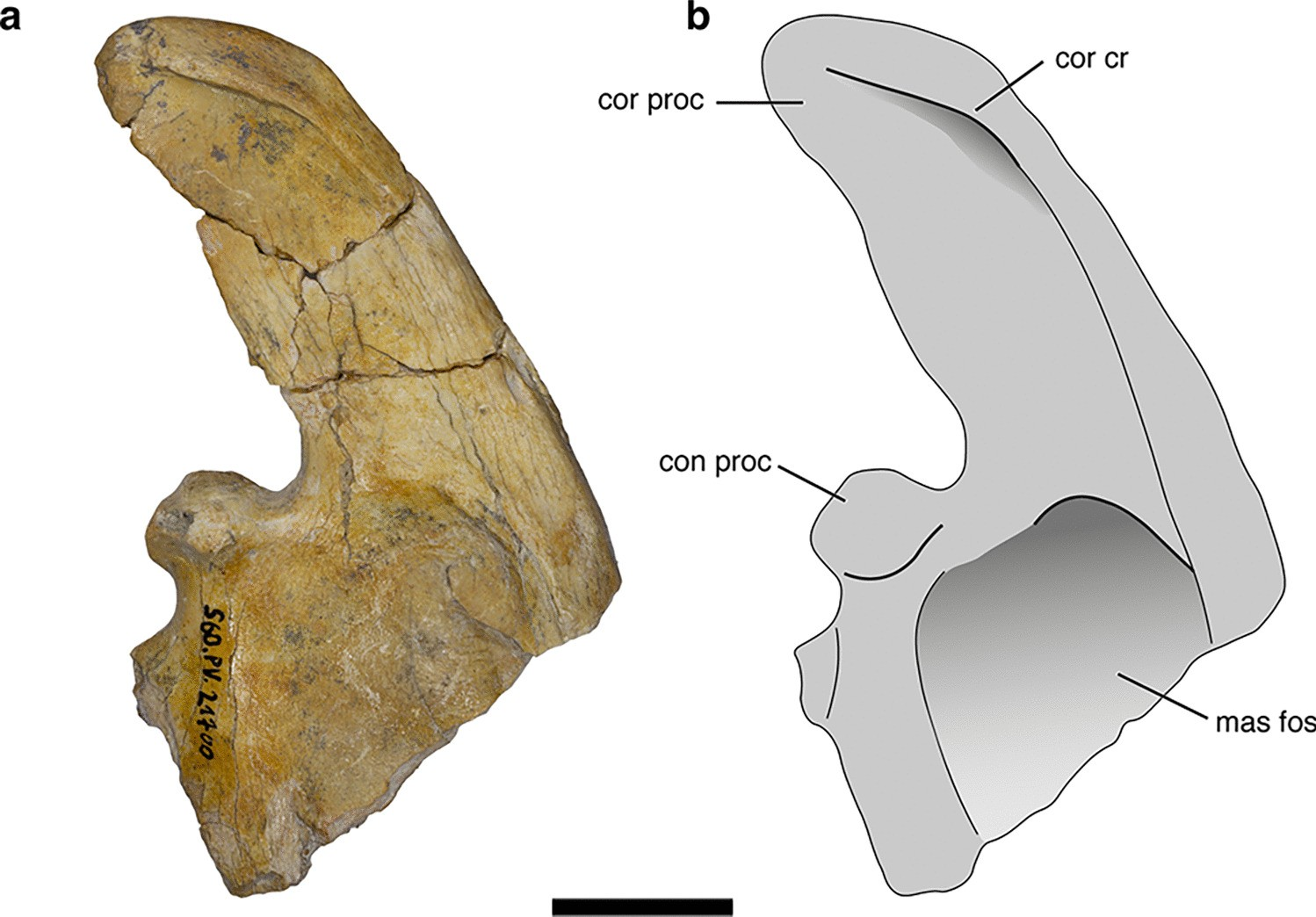
Right mandible of Micrauchenia

The right mandible fragment preserves just the dorsal portion of the ramus with the coronoid and the condylar processes. The condylar process is small, cylindrical and posteriorly has a slightly convex articular facet where it articulates with the glenoid fossa on the squamosal. The mandibular notch is anteroposteriorly very narrow. The coronoid process is anteroposteriorly narrow, dorsoventrally elongated and mediolaterally slender. There is no sign of a condyloid crest in contrast to Cramauchenia normalis and Macrauchenia which share a subtle but noticeable condyloid crest dividing the masseteric fossa into two halves. In Theosodon, the condyloid crest may be variable, as there appears to be a very subtle ridge in Theosodon garretorum, but this is absent in Theosodon lydekkeri specimens. Llullataruca shockeyi also seems to lack a condyloid crest. Apart from differences in the development of the condyloid crest and differences in size, the general outline of this element is very similar to Miocene macraucheniids like Theosodon and Llullataruca, and also to more derived Pleistocene macraucheniids like Macrauchenia, which indicates that over time this element has been mostly conserved within this family.

== Paleobiology ==
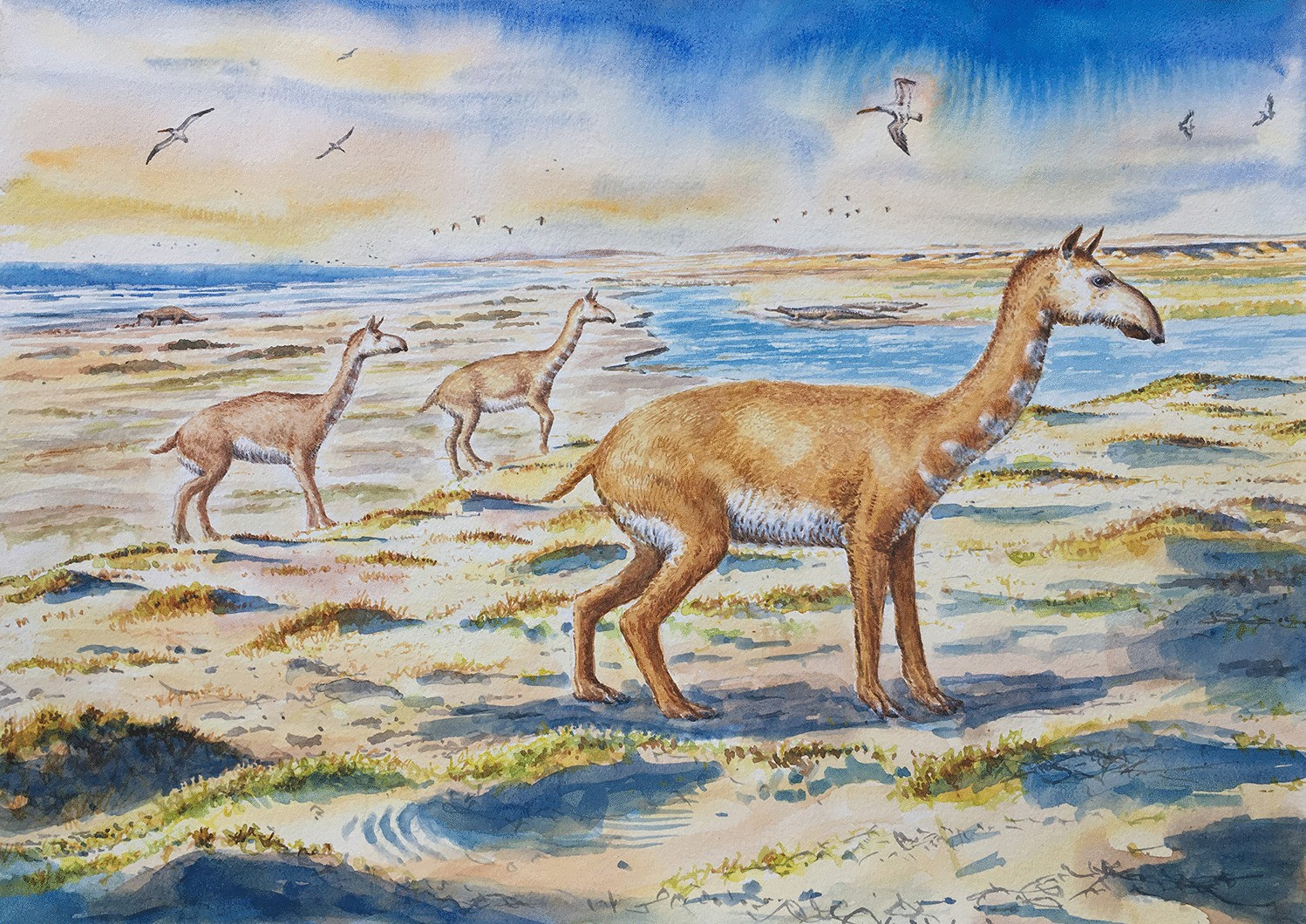
Life restoration

Micrauchenia lived in a coastal environment with lush sclerophyll woodland and shrubland vegetation.
