= Myospalax convexus =

Myospalax convexus Temporal range: Calabrian

Scientific classification
- Domain: Eukaryota
- Kingdom: Animalia
- Phylum: Chordata
- Class: Mammalia
- Order: Rodentia
- Family: Spalacidae
- Genus: Myospalax
- Species: †M. convexus

Binomial name
- †Myospalax convexus Golovanov & Zazhigin, 2023

Extinct species of mammal

Myospalax convexus is an extinct species of Myospalax that inhabited Russia during the Early Pleistocene.
