= Americanycteris =

Americanycteris Temporal range: Early Miocene

Scientific classification
- Kingdom: Animalia
- Phylum: Chordata
- Class: Mammalia
- Infraclass: Placentalia
- Order: Chiroptera
- Family: Phyllostomidae
- Genus: †Americanycteris
- Species: †A. cyrtodon

Binomial name
- †Americanycteris cyrtodon Morgan et al., 2023

Extinct genus of bats

Americanycteris is an extinct genus of phyllostomid bat that lived during the Early Miocene.

== Distribution ==
A. cyrtodon is known from Panama, being a member of the Arikareean Lirio Norte Local Fauna and the Hemingfordian Centenario Fauna.
