= Pictodelphis =

Pictodelphis Temporal range: Middle Miocene (Langhian) ~15.97–13.82 Ma

Scientific classification
- Domain: Eukaryota
- Kingdom: Animalia
- Phylum: Chordata
- Class: Mammalia
- Order: Artiodactyla
- Suborder: Whippomorpha
- Infraorder: Cetacea
- Clade: Delphinida
- Genus: †Pictodelphis; Godfrey & Lambert, 2023

Type species
- † Pictodelphis kidwellae

Extinct genus of mammals

Pictodelphis was a genus of basal delphinidan from the Calvert Formation (Plum Point Member), dating back to the Miocene of Maryland, USA. It is known from one species, Pictodelphis kidwellae.
