= Tavridia =

Tavridia Temporal range: Early Pleistocene

Scientific classification
- Kingdom: Animalia
- Phylum: Chordata
- Class: Mammalia
- Infraclass: Placentalia
- Order: Artiodactyla
- Family: Bovidae
- Subfamily: Antilopinae
- Genus: †Tavridia
- Species: †T. gromovi

Binomial name
- †Tavridia gromovi Vislobokova, 2023

Extinct genus of antilopin bovid

Tavridia is an extinct monotypic genus of antilopin bovid that lived in Crimea during the Early Pleistocene subepoch.

== Etymology ==
The generic name Tavridia references Taurida Cave, the fossil site from which the type specimen of the genus hails. The specific epithet of the type species, Tavridia gromovi, honours the Russian Quaternary scientist V. I. Gromov.
