= Vielasia =

Vielasia Temporal range: Early Eocene

Scientific classification
- Kingdom: Animalia
- Phylum: Chordata
- Class: Mammalia
- Order: Chiroptera
- Genus: †Vielasia; Hand, Maugoust, Beck, & Orliac, 2023

Type species
- †Vielasia sigei Hand, Maugoust, Beck, & Orliac, 2023

Species
- V. sigei

Extinct genus of bats

Vielasia is an extinct genus of bats from the Early Eocene of Europe. They are known from hundreds of specimens, some of them unusually complete, from a 50 million-year-old cave deposit in southern France and are the oldest bats definitively known to have lived in caves. The only known species is estimated to have weighed about 18.94 g (0.668 oz), compared with a median value of 13.8 g (0.49 oz) for living bat species. It is regarded as closely related to, but outside, the clade of all living bats, but already shared many features with modern species. For example, some details of the skeleton, including the shape and size of the inner ear canal, indicate that it was capable of both powered flight and echolocation, and that it probably ate flying insects.
