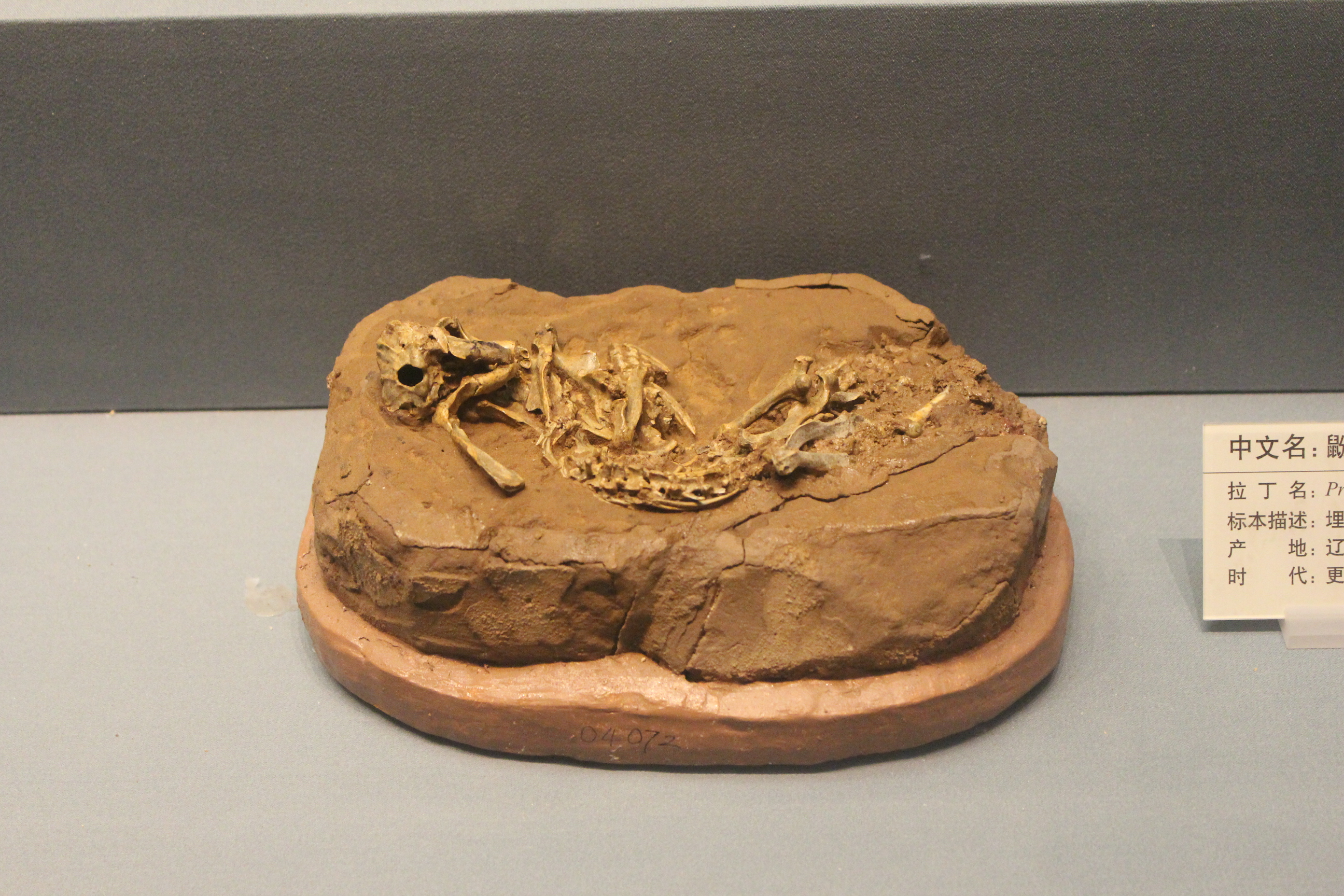
- Fossil specimen, Tianjin Natural History Museum

Scientific classification
- Domain: Eukaryota
- Kingdom: Animalia
- Phylum: Chordata
- Class: Mammalia
- Order: Rodentia
- Family: †Siphneidae
- Genus: †Prosiphneus; Teilhard de Jardin 1926
- Species: †P. licenti

Binomial name
- †Prosiphneus licenti Teilhard de Jardin 1926

= Prosiphneus =

Prosiphneus Temporal range: Miocene–Pleistocene

Extinct genus of rodents

Prosiphneus is an extinct genus of rodent that lived during Miocene to Quaternary of China and Russia.
