= Zorania =

Zorania Temporal range: Rupelian

Scientific classification
- Kingdom: Animalia
- Phylum: Chordata
- Class: Mammalia
- Infraclass: Placentalia
- Order: Rodentia
- Family: †Chapattimyidae
- Subfamily: †Baluchimyinae
- Genus: †Zorania; Van de Weerd et al., 2023
- Species: †Z. milosi

Binomial name
- †Zorania milosi Van de Weerd et al., 2023

Extinct genus of mammals

Zorania is an extinct genus of baluchimyine rodent that lived during the Rupelian stage of the Oligocene epoch.

== Distribution ==
Zorania milosi fossils are known from the Selimye Formation in the Sivas Basin of Turkey and date back to around 29 Ma.
