= Platysvercus =

Platysvercus Temporal range: Burdigalian

Scientific classification
- Kingdom: Animalia
- Phylum: Chordata
- Class: Mammalia
- Order: Artiodactyla
- Infraorder: Cetacea
- Family: †Lophocetidae
- Genus: †Platysvercus; Guo and Kohno, 2023
- Species: †P. ugonis

Binomial name
- †Platysvercus ugonis Guo and Kohno, 2023

Extinct genus of mammals

Platysvercus is an extinct genus of kentriodontid whale that inhabited the seas around what is now Japan during the Burdigalian stage of the Miocene epoch. It is a monotypic genus known from a single species, Platysvercus ugonis.
