= Octomys rosiae =

Octomys rosiae Temporal range: Holocene

Scientific classification
- Kingdom: Animalia
- Phylum: Chordata
- Class: Mammalia
- Infraclass: Placentalia
- Order: Rodentia
- Family: Octodontidae
- Genus: Octomys
- Species: †O. rosiae

Binomial name
- †Octomys rosiae Verzi et al., 2023

Extinct species of mammal

Octomys rosiae is an extinct species of Octomys that inhabited Argentina during the Holocene epoch.
