= Tapiruloides =

Tapiruloides Temporal range: Eocene

Scientific classification
- Kingdom: Animalia
- Phylum: Chordata
- Class: Mammalia
- Infraclass: Placentalia
- Order: Artiodactyla
- Family: †Tapirulidae
- Genus: †Tapiruloides
- Species: †T. usuensis

Binomial name
- †Tapiruloides usuensis Bai et al., 2023

Extinct genus of tapirulid artiodactyl

Tapiruloides is an extinct monotypic genus of tapirulid ungulate that lived in East Asia during the Eocene epoch.

== Etymology ==
The generic name Tapiruloides is derived from the name of the genus Tapirulus, a relative of Tapiruloides, and the Greek suffix -oides, meaning similar or alike, referencing its close kinship to Tapirulus. The specific epithet of the type species, Tapiruloides usuensis, is in reference to the locality of Ula Usu in Inner Mongolia, where the holotype fossil of the species was found.

== Description ==
Tapiruloides is distinct from related tapirulid genera due to the cristid obliqua being almost entirely absent on all of its mandibular molars and due to its M_{3} possessing a beak-like hypoconulid. Tapiruloides can also be distinguished from Tapirulus in that the former has a more anteriorly placed entoconid to the hypoconid compared to the latter.
