= Afrolagus =

Afrolagus Temporal range: Piacenzian–Gelasian

Scientific classification
- Kingdom: Animalia
- Phylum: Chordata
- Class: Mammalia
- Infraclass: Placentalia
- Order: Lagomorpha
- Family: Leporidae
- Genus: †Afrolagus
- Species: †A. pomeli

Binomial name
- †Afrolagus pomeli Sen & Geraads, 2023

Type of leporid

Afrolagus is an extinct genus of leporid that lived in the Maghreb during the Pliocene and Pleistocene epochs.

== Distribution ==
Afrolagus pomeli is known from the fossil site of Ahl al Oughlam in Morocco.
