= Palaeohodites =

Scientific classification
- Kingdom: Animalia
- Phylum: Chordata
- Class: Mammalia
- Order: Primates
- Suborder: Strepsirrhini
- Family: †Ekgmowechashalidae
- Genus: †Palaeohodites; Rust et al., 2023
- Species: †P. naduensis

Binomial name
- †Palaeohodites naduensis Rust et al., 2023

Extinct genus of primates

Palaeohodites is an extinct genus of primate from the Eocene Nadu Formation of China. Living about 35 million years ago during the late Eocene, Palaeohodites belongs to an extinct group of primates known as adapiforms, related to modern day lemurs and lorises. Specifically, this genus is one member of the family Ekgmowechashalidae, known primarily from the Eocene and Oligocene of Asia. Notably, Palaeohodites has been recovered as the sister taxon of Ekgmowechashala, the latest primate known to exist in North America before the arrival of humans at the end of the Pleistocene.

== Taxonomy ==
Palaeohodites is a monotypic genus currently represented only by the species P. naduensis. Palaeohodites belongs to the family Ekgemowechashalidae. The affinities of this clade have historically been quite contentious, with most previous research placing it within either Omomyidae or Plagiomenidae, which are typically considered as primates and dermopterans, respectively. More recent analyses have definitively recovered ekgmowechashalids as adapiform primates based on various characters such as their retention of a double-rooted lower second premolar, a plesiomorphic trait that does not occur in omomyids or anthropoids.

The family Ekgmowechasdhalidae includes two subfamilies: Bugtilemurinae, containing the genera Bugtilemur and Muangthanhinius, and Ekgmowechashalinae, containing Palaeohodites and Ekgmowechashala itself. The genus Gatanthropus has also been recovered within the family, but its exact placement relative to the other genera and subfamilies remains unresolved.

== Biogeographic implications ==
Palaeohodites lived in present-day China during the late Eocene, several million years before its sister taxon, Ekgmowechashala, appears in North America. As its morphology has been described as intermediate between that of Ekgmowechashala and more primitive Asian ekgmowechashalids, Palaeohodites provides evidence that Ekgmowechalinae originated in Asia, not North America. This suggests that Ekgmowechashala itself represents an immigrant lineage from southern Asia, where primates could take refuge in lower latitudes from the global cooling across the Eocene-Oligocene boundary that drove the extinction of their North American counterparts.

== Description ==
Although it was first discovered in the 1990s, very few specimens of Palaeohodites have been found, and a few upper and lower jaw fragments are all that is known about its anatomy. Palaeohodites shared many dental similarities with Ekgmowechashala, including the presence of double-rooted P2's, with a slight distinction being that Palaeohodites possessed more widely spaced roots. Both genera also had highly crenulated enamel, suggesting a diet that included hard foods like nuts and seeds. Unlike Ekgmowechashala, Palaeohodites also had longer and narrower P2 and P3. The upper molars (based on M2) of Palaeohodites and Ekgmowechashala share a unique feature in having a duplicated protocone cusp lingually, which is one of the most important characters supporting a close evolutionary relationship between these two primates. The distinctive upper and lower molars of Palaeohodites support it having a herbivorous diet consistent focusing on hard objects.

== Paleoenvironment ==
Palaeohodites lived in the Baise Basin of Guangxi Zhuang Autonomous Region in southern China near the Eocene-Oligocene boundary. The Baise Basin, more specifically the Nadu Formation where Paleohodites was discovered, is a rocky terrain filled with mudstone, sandstone, and coal. The adapiforms, including Palaeohodites, would have inhabited a subtropical climate similar to that of modern-day Madagascar. Evergreen and deciduous broad-leaved trees would have been widespread and easily accessible around the terrain, providing abundant food and habitat resources for arboreal species like Palaeohodites.

Palaeohodites lived just prior to the Eocene-Oligocene boundary, an interval marked by significant climatic changes, including the transition from the Eocene greenhouse to the Oligocene icehouse. The drastic drop in temperature associated with the Eocene-Oligocene boundary likely played a crucial role in the mass extinction of adapiforms living in North America and Europe by rapidly altering their environment. While the direct impact of this cooling event on Palaeohodites remains uncertain, it was probably able to survive the climatic deterioration around the Eocene-Oligocene boundary by inhabiting the warm, subtropical ecosystem of southern China and adjacent regions.

== Morphology ==
The upper and lower molars of Palaeohodites resemble those of Ekgmowechashala, with both taxa having a duplicated protocone on upper molars and neomorphic cusps on the lower molars. A prominent neomorphic cusp on the lower M1 is located on the central part of the postvallid, but additional neomorphic cusps occur in other locations on the lower molars. Palaeohodites and Ekgmowechashala share a similar number of cusps on M2 and a prominent "lingual wall" of cusps and crests that may be partly homologous with the postprotocingulum. Palaeohodites differs from Ekgmowechashala in having the protocone and duplicated protocone very closely spaced, while these structures are farther apart in Ekgmowechashala. The lower premolars of Palaeohodites and Ekgmowechashala are similar as well, both having a double-rooted P2 and P3. The lower premolars of Palaeohodites are longer and narrower than those of Ekgmowechashala.
