= Cat gap =

Gap in the fossil record

The cat gap is a period in the fossil record of approximately 25 million to 18.5 million years ago in which there is an absence of cat-like species found in North America following the extinction of nimravids. The cause of the "cat gap" is disputed, but it may have been caused by changes in the climate (global cooling), changes in the habitat and ecosystem, morphology of the Canidae species present in North America, or a periodicity of extinctions called van der Hammen cycles.

== Feliform evolution ==
Feliform evolutionary timeline

Nimravids, also known as false-sabertoothed cats, were a group of saber-toothed predators that occupied the cat-like niche prior to the appearance of felids. Despite their cat-like appearance, they aren’t actually true cats, but instead a distinct family of feliforms. Nimravids first appeared in North America around 40 Ma, with the appearance of Pangurban. The diversification of nimravids was due to the extinction of oxyaenids, which opened the niche of cat-like predators. North American nimravids reached their highest diversity of 6 contemporary species during the Whitneyan and early Arikareean. ^{Including supplementary materials} The last North American nimravid, Pogonodon, went extinct 26 Ma, which marked the beginning of the "cat gap". Proailurus appeared about 30 million years ago, is generally considered the first "true cat".

Following the appearance of the dawn cat, there is little in the fossil record for 10 million years to suggest that cats would prosper. In fact, although Proailurus persisted for at least 14 million years, there are so few felid fossils towards the end of the dawn cat's reign that paleontologists refer to this as the "cat gap". The turning point for cats came about with the appearance of a new genus of felids, Pseudaelurus.

Pseudaelurus crossed over to North America from surviving populations in Asia 18.5 million years ago, which marked the end of the cat gap. All modern-day felids are descended from Pseudaelurus-grade felids.

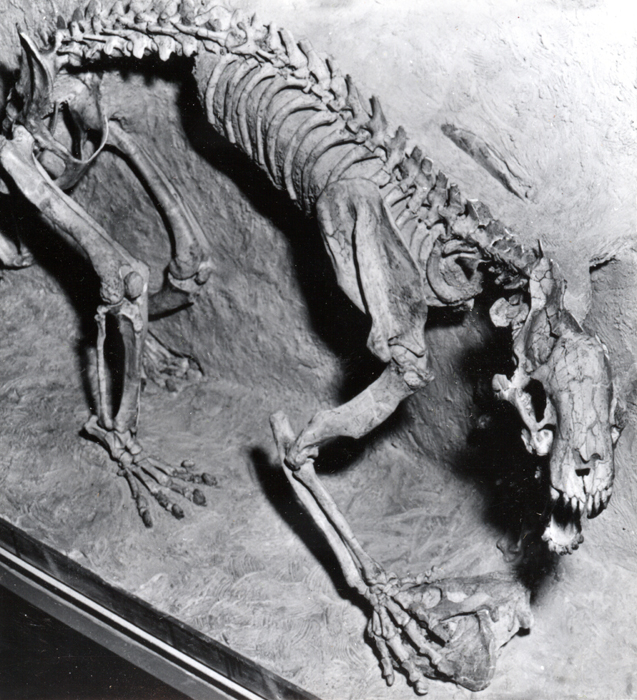
Skeleton reconstruction of Hoplophoneus primaevus, one of the cat-like predators present in North America during the Paleogene

== Possible causes ==
=== Changes in climate and habitat ===
Another possible explanation for the extinction of feliforms in North America is changes in the ecology of the continent. Evidence from the geologic temperature record shows that the earth was experiencing a period of global cooling, causing forests to give way to savannas. Nimravids favored forested environments, with a few exceptions such as Eusmilus, showing adaptations for open environments. Nimravids were significantly less agile and slower than their preferred prey, which was disadvantageous in expanding grasslands. Additionally, competition with caniforms, such as amphicyonids and canids, may have prevented nimravids from occupying open environments.

=== Other ===
There is also evidence that during the Miocene a sill surrounding the Arctic Ocean, known as the Greenland–Scotland Ridge, subsided, allowing more cold polar water to escape into the North Atlantic. As the salinity of the North Atlantic grew and as outflow of cold polar water increased, so the thermohaline circulation increased in vigour, providing the mild winter temperatures and large amounts of moisture to the North Atlantic, which are prerequisites to the build-up of the large continental ice caps on the adjacent cold continents.

== Evolution of caniforms during the gap ==
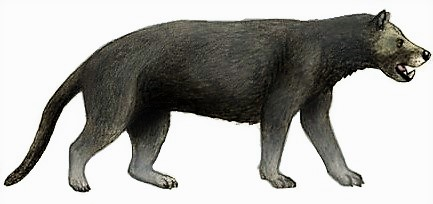
Some paleontologists argue that caniforms like Amphicyonidae – "bear dogs" - responded to the cat gap by evolving to become more cat-like, to fill the hypercarnivore niche.

However, Wesley-Hunt (2005) disagreed with this conclusion after their morphospace analysis.
