= Nanosmilus =

Nanosmilus Temporal range: Early Oligocene (Orellan) 33.89–32.1 Ma

Scientific classification
- Kingdom: Animalia
- Phylum: Chordata
- Class: Mammalia
- Order: Carnivora
- Family: †Nimravidae
- Subfamily: †Nimravinae
- Genus: †Nanosmilus; Martin, 1992
- Species: †N. kurteni

Binomial name
- †Nanosmilus kurteni Martin, 1992

Extinct species of carnivore

Nanosmilus is a nimravid from the Oligocene (Whitneyan to Arikareean stages) of Nebraska. As a member of Feliformia, it is related to the superficially similar-appearing true cats. As such, it and nimravid genera in general are often referred to as false saber-toothed cats. No larger than a small bobcat, it is the smallest known saber-toothed mammal currently recognized by science. It is most closely related to its fellow nimravid Eusmilus.

== Description ==
Nanosmilus was first discovered in 1880, by Edward Drinker Cope, and described from fragmentary material. It wasn't until more complete skulls were discovered that Nanosmilus became better known to science. For many decades, it was thought to be a member of the genus Eusmilus and was labelled as Eusmilus cerebralis. Its similarities to Eusmilus are such that they were often considered to be members of the same genus as recently as 2013; however, a 2016 phylogenetic analysis found it to be a separate taxon. Nanosmilus is more primitive than Eusmilus in regards to its anatomy. Its skull is narrower than both Hoplophoneus and Eusmilus and its sagittal crest, which is smaller, separates into a "V" shape above the glenoid facet, which is different to the sagittal crest's divergence points in Eusmilus and Hoplophoneus respectively. It also differs from these genera in having narrower frontals, among other features. Its orbits are large, indicating that it had good eyesight. Unlike Eusmilus, Nanosmilus was equipped with smaller flanges on its lower jaws than its later relative Eusmilus had to protect its saber-teeth, and it likely was more vulnerable to tooth breakage due to the lack of this protective adaptation. Despite its small size, Nanosmilus was still more than capable of killing animals as large as modern domestic pigs or deer, indicating it was already a specialist at hunting animals much larger than itself.
