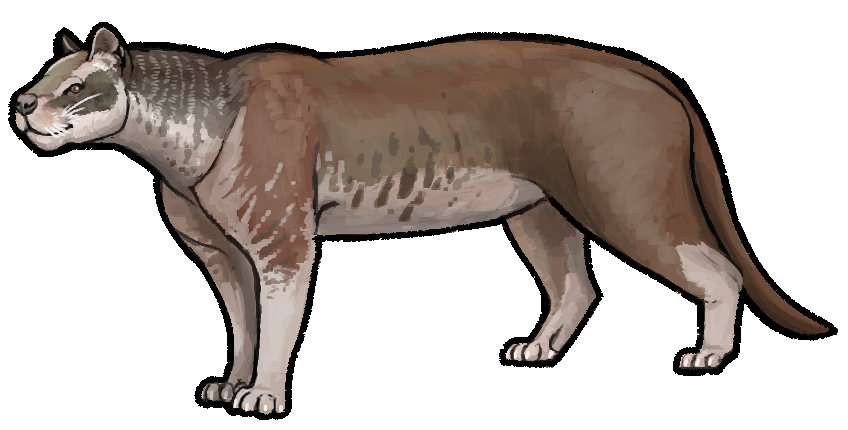
- Restoration of Taotienimravus songi

Scientific classification
- Kingdom: Animalia
- Phylum: Chordata
- Class: Mammalia
- Order: Carnivora
- Family: †Nimravidae
- Subfamily: †Nimravinae
- Genus: †Taotienimravus; Jiangzuo et al., 2025
- Species: †T. songi

Binomial name
- †Taotienimravus songi Jiangzuo et al., 2025

= Taotienimravus =

Taotienimravus Temporal range: Middle Oligocene 28 Ma

Extinct genus of false saber tooth cats

Taotienimravus is an extinct genus of false saber tooth cats (Nimravinae) that lived in Eastern Asia during the middle Oligocene epoch. Currently only species in this genus is Taotienimravus songi making it a monotypic genus. Its lack of saber teeth and bone-cracking adaptations make Taotienimravus unique among Nimravidae.

Phylogenetic analysis show that it is closely related to Nimravus and Dinaelurus. Genera like Taotienimravus show that with the extinction of many carnivorous groups like Oxyaenidae opened ecological niches to allow more members of Carnivora to fill those niches.
