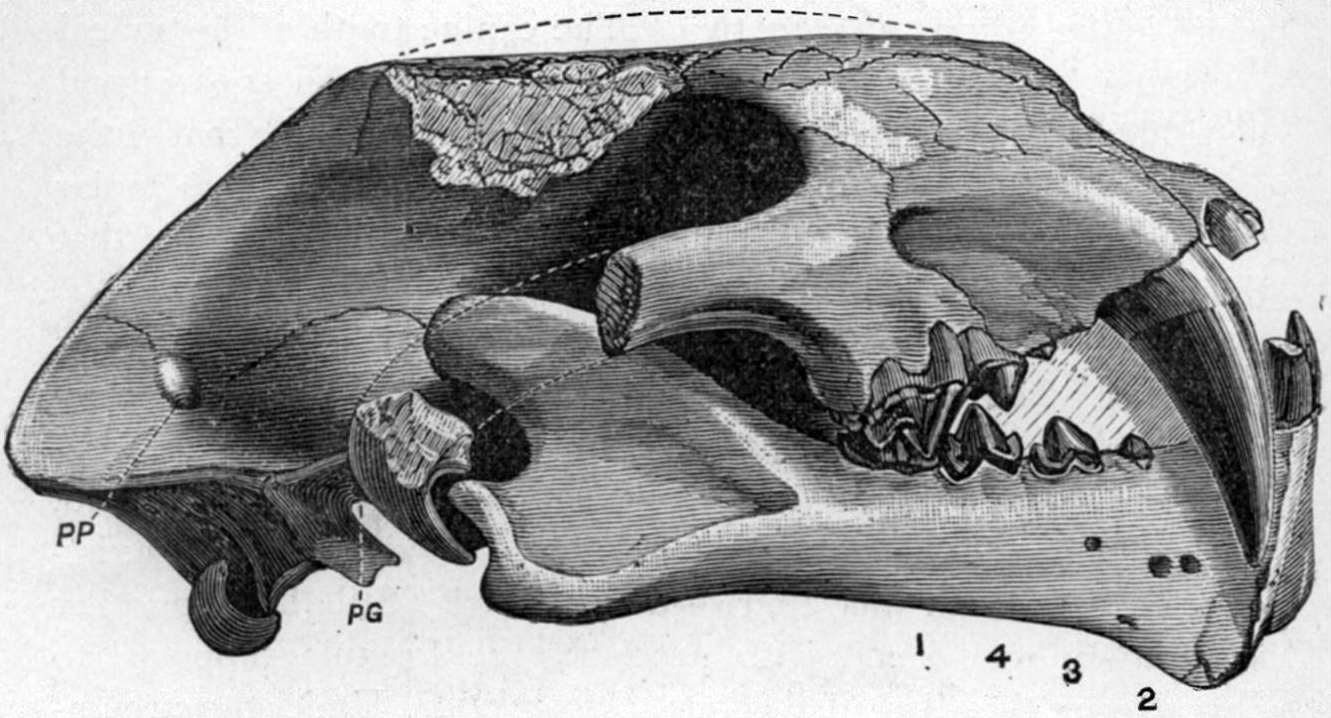
- Skull of P. platycopis

Scientific classification
- Kingdom: Animalia
- Phylum: Chordata
- Class: Mammalia
- Order: Carnivora
- Family: †Nimravidae
- Subfamily: †Nimravinae
- Genus: †Pogonodon; Cope, 1880

Type species
- †Pogonodon platycopis (Cope, 1879)

Species
- P. davisi Merriam, 1906; P. platycopis (Cope, 1879) (type)

Synonyms
- Hoplophoneus platycopis Cope, 1879; Pogonodon cismontanus Thorpe, 1920; Pogonodon serrulidens Eaton, 1922; Dinictis eileenae Macdonald, 1970

= Pogonodon =

Pogonodon Temporal range: Early-Late Oligocene, (Whitneyan to Arikareean) 32.0–25.9 Ma

Extinct genus of carnivores

Pogonodon is an extinct genus of cat-like nimravid endemic to North America during the Oligocene from 32.0 to 25.9 Ma. ^{Including supplementary materials} The genus the consists of two species P. davisi and P. platycopis. Pogonodon was the last nimravine to go extinct in North America, possibly due to competition with amphicyonids and expansion of grasslands. Its extinction marked the beginning of the cat gap, a 7 million year period without any cat-like predators in North America.

Nimravids wouldn’t reappear in North America until the arrival of barbourofelines, Albanosmilus whitfordi and Barbourofelis.

== Description ==
Pogonodon was have been similar in size to jaguars. Humerus measurements suggest P. platycopis had a humeral robustness greater than other nimravids, despite having shorter sabers than Hoplophoneus.

== Extinction ==
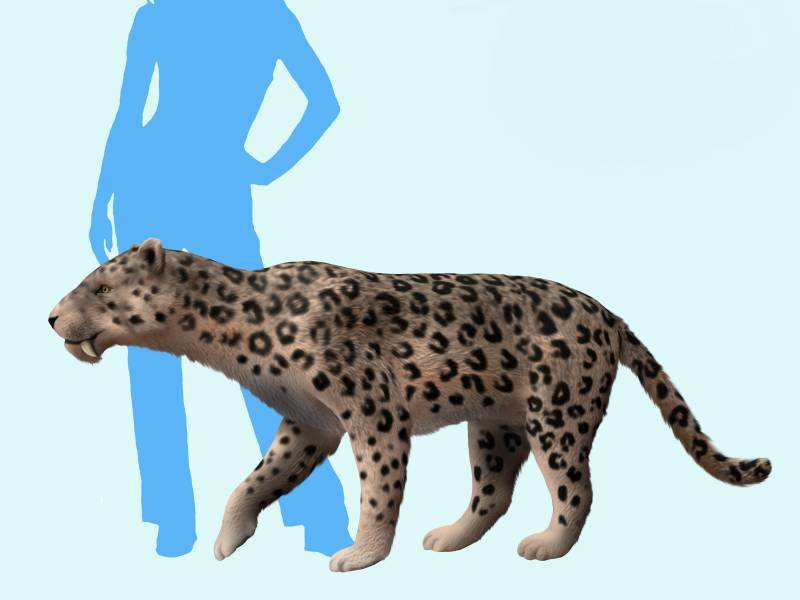
Life restoration

Pogonodon was the last nimravine to go extinct in North America. During the Early Oligocene, nimravids began to decline globally due to the increase in aridity, which saw an expansion of open environments. Pogonodon was able to persist longer than other North American nimravids due to its relative cursoriality. However, it likely wasn't able to compete withe amphicyonids due their cursoriality and more generalized dentition compared to nimravids. The extinction of last nimravids such as Pogonodon started the cat gap, a 7 million year period with no cat-predators in North America, which ended upon the arrival of the true cat, Pseudaelurus.

Nimravids wouldn't reappear in North America until the appearance of barbourofelines, Albanosmilus whitfordi and Barbourofelis, around 12 Ma.
