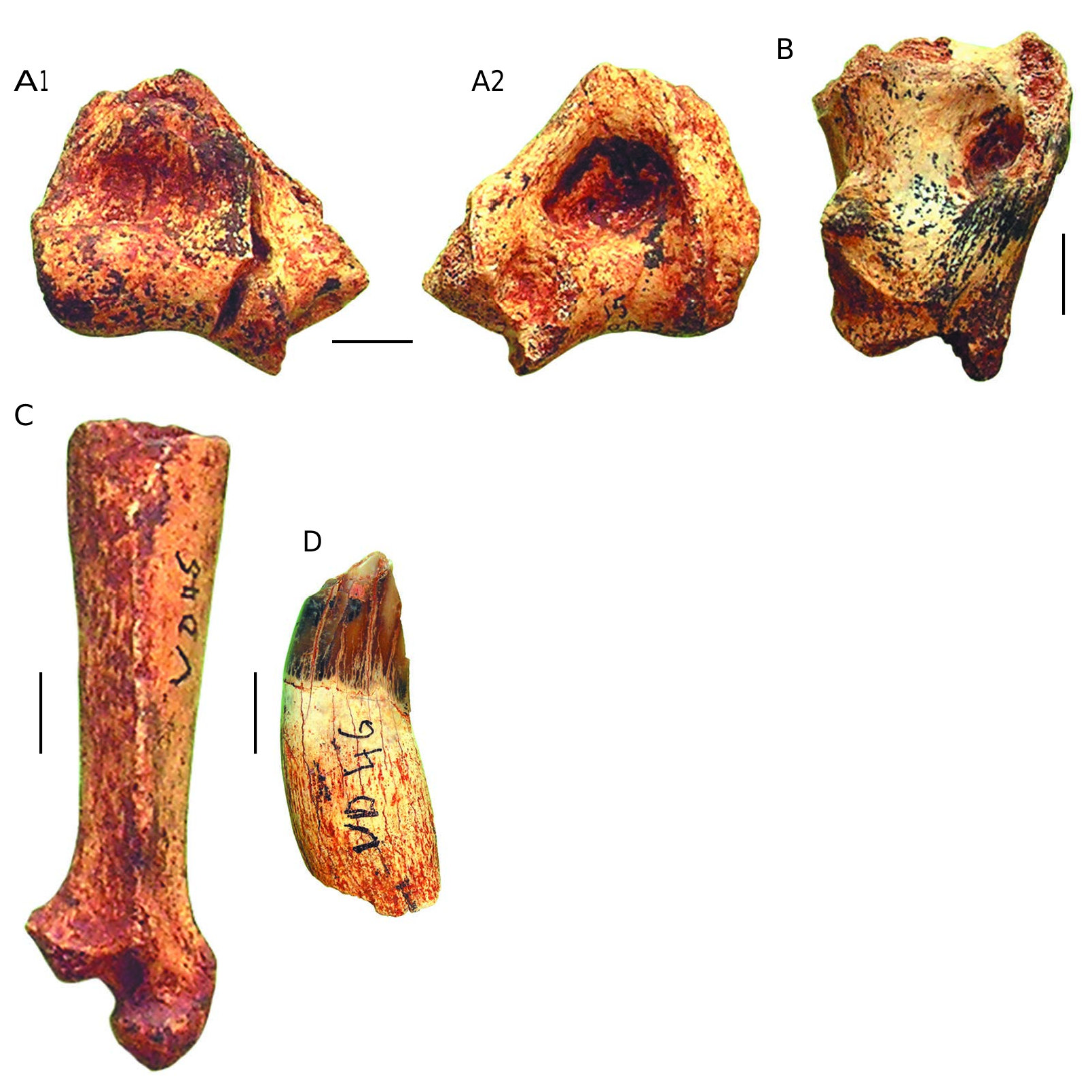

Scientific classification
- Kingdom: Animalia
- Phylum: Chordata
- Class: Mammalia
- Order: Carnivora
- Family: †Nimravidae
- Subfamily: †Nimravinae
- Genus: †Dinailurictis; Helbing, 1922
- Species: †D. bonali

Binomial name
- †Dinailurictis bonali Helbing, 1922

= Dinailurictis =

Dinailurictis Temporal range: Early to Late Oligocene (Rupelian to Chattian) 32.6–27.2 Ma

Extinct genus of carnivores

Dinailurictis is an extinct nimravid carnivoran (or "false sabre-toothed cat") belonging to the subfamily Nimravinae. It was named in 1922, with subsequent material being recovered from Early to Late Oligocene deposits across France and Spain.

== Taxonomy ==
There is only one known species classified within the genus, Dinailurictis bonali. Initial remains from La Tuque, France consisted of a left, upper canine noticeably larger than Eofelis, Nimravus, and Eusmilus. Subsequent remains consisting of limb bones and additional teeth have since been found.

Dinailurictis does resemble and was related to Nimravus as members of the Nimravinae subfamily, but do the two genera differ in several anatomical traits. Skeletal morphology aligns Dinailurictis closer with the somewhat larger genus, Quercylurus. Systematic review conducted in 2003 found Quercylus major and Dinailurictis bonali to be extremely similar to one another, with the larger size of the former being the major difference.

== Description ==
Dinailurictis was one of the larger nimravids of its time, estimated to have weighed 130 kg (290 lb), making it about the size of a lioness. Having had a sleek body like caracal, with its back being elongated and having feet more resembling basal Feliformia members like civets, with partially retractable claws. Dinailurictis was likely a generalist predator, hunting both small game whilst being capable of hunting larger ungulates. It likely was an ambush predator as the medial lip of the trochlea is less projecting than in modern large cats, with a projected lip affixing the elbow joint. These traits potentially indicate Dinailurictis was less cursorial in respect to cranio-caudal movements.

Its canine fangs were more conical in shape than some of more derived sabre-toothed condition of more derived Nimravidae genera, but were still scimitar-like in shape.

== Paleoecology ==
Within Quercy Phosporites of France, Dinailurictis coexisted with mammals such as the closely related, Quercylurus major, anthracotheriine Anthracotherium monsvialense, and lophiomerycidae Lophiomeryx mouchelini.
