= Tatrot Formation =

Geological formation

- Stratigraphic range: Late Miocene to Pliocene 5.5–2.58 Ma
- Type: Geologic formation
- Underlies: Pinjor Formation
- Overlies: Dhok Pathan Formation

Lithology
- Primary: Sandstone
- Other: Mudstone

Location
- Region: Siwalik Hills
- Country: Pakistan, India

Type section
- Named for: Tatrot Village, Pakistan
- Saketi Beds Tatrot Formation (India) Tatrot Beds Tatrot Formation (Pakistan)

The Tatrot Formation is a geological formation in Siwalik Hills of Northern India and Pakistan that date back to Late Miocene to Pliocene epochs.

== Fossil content ==
Color key: Taxon / Reclassified taxon / Taxon falsely reported as present / Dubious taxon or junior synonym / Ichnotaxon / Ootaxon / Morphotaxon

Notes
Uncertain or tentative taxa are in small text
~~crossed out~~ taxa are discredited.

=== Mammals ===
==== Eulipotypas ====
Eulipotyphlas from the Tatrot Formation
Genus	Species	Location	Stratigraphic position	Material	Notes	Image
Suncus	cf. S. murinus	Saketi Beds			A crocidurine soricid.	

==== Rodents ====
Rodents from the Tatrot Formation
Genus	Species	Location	Stratigraphic position	Material	Notes	Image
Chalicomys	sp.	Saketi Beds			A castorid, includes Palaeomys.	
Miorhizomys	M. pilgrimi	Saketi Beds			A rhizomyine spalacid.	
Rhizomyides	R. saketiensis	Saketi Beds			A rhizomyine spalacids.	
Rhizomyides	R. punjabiensis	Saketi Beds			A rhizomyine spalacids.	
Rhizomyides	R. sivalensis	Saketi Beds			A rhizomyine spalacids.	
Mus	M. flynni	Saketi Beds			A murine murid.	
Mus	M. jacobsi	Saketi Beds			A murine murid.	
Hadromys	H. primitivus	Saketi Beds			A murine murid.	
Hadromys	H. moginandensis	Saketi Beds			A murine murid.	
Cremnomys	cf. C. cutchicus	Saketi Beds			A murine murid.	
Bandicota	B. sivalensis	Saketi Bed			A murine murid.	
Parapelomys	P. robertsi	Saketi Beds			A murine murid.	
Parapelomys	cf. P. robertsi	Saketi Beds			A murine murid.	
Golunda	G. tatroticus	Saketi Beds			A murine murid.	
Dilatomys	D. moginandensis	Saketi Beds			A murine murid.	
Protatera	cf. P. kabulense	Saketi Beds			A gerbilline murid.	
Abudhabia	cf. A. kabulense	Saketi Beds			A gerbilline murid.	

==== Lagomorphs ====
Lagomorphs from the Tatrot Formation
Genus	Species	Location	Stratigraphic position	Material	Notes	Image
Pliosiwalagus	P. whitei	Saketi Beds			A Leporid.	

==== Proboscideans ====
Proboscideans from the Tatrot Formation
Genus	Species	Location	Stratigraphic position	Material	Notes	Image
Pentalophodon	P. khetpuraliensis	Saketi Beds			A gomphothere.	
Anancus	A.? perimensis	Saketi Beds			A elephantoid proboscidean.	
Anancus	A. sivalensis	Saketi Beds			A elephantoid proboscidean.	
Stegodon	S. bombifrons	Tatrot Beds			A stegodontid proboscidean.	
Stegodon	S. insignis				A stegodontid proboscidean.	
Stegodon	S. sp.	Saketi Beds			A stegodontid proboscidean.	
Elephas	E. planifrons	Saketi beds			A elephantid proboscidean.	

==== Feliforms ====
Feliforms from the Tatrot Formation
Genus	Species	Location	Stratigraphic position	Material	Notes	Image
Saketoteron	S. tatroinse	Saketi Beds		Partial Mandibular Ramus.	A nimravine nimravid.	
Metailurus	cf. M. hengduanshanensis	Tatrot Beds			A machairodontine felid.	
Lycyaena	cf. L. dubia	Tatrot Beds			A hyaenid.	

==== Caniforms ====
Caniforms from the Tatrot Formation
Genus	Species	Location	Stratigraphic position	Material	Notes	Image
Amblonyx	A. barryi	Tatrot Beds			A lutrine mustelid.	
Enhydriodon	E. falconeri	Tatrot Beds, Saketi Beds			A enhydriodontin lutrine.	

==== Perissodactyls ====
Perissodactyls from the Tatrot Formation
Genus	Species	Location	Stratigraphic position	Material	Notes	Image
Subchilotherium	S. intermedium	Saketi Beds			An aceratheriine rhinocerotid.	
Hipparion	H. antilopinum	Saketi Beds			An hipparionin equine.	
Cormohipparion	C. theobaldi	Saketi Beds			An hipparionin equine.	

==== Artiodactyls ====
Artiodactyls from the Tatrot Formation
Genus	Species	Location	Stratigraphic position	Material	Notes	Image
Antilope	A. intermedia	Tatrot Beds			An antilopin antilopine.	
Merycopotamus	M. dissimilis	Saketi Beds			A bothriodontine anthracotheriid.	
Hippohyus	H. tatroti	Saketi Beds			A hyppohyn suine.	
Proamphibos	P. kashmiricus	Saketi Beds, Tatrot Beds			A bovin bovine.	
Probison	P. dehumi	Saketi Beds			A bovin bovine.	
Camelus	C. sivalensis	Saketi beds		"partial mandibular ramus".	A camelin cameline. May only be restricted to Pinjor Formation.	
Bovini	indet	Saketi beds			A bovin bovine.	
Sivatherium	S. giganteum	Saketi beds			A sivatheriin giraffid.	
Potamochoerus	P. sp	Saketi beds			A suin suid.	
Leptobos	L. falconeri	Saketi beds			A bovin bovine.	
Hexaprotodon	H. sivalensis	Saketi beds			A hippopotamid.	

=== Reptiles ===
==== Crocodilians ====
Crocodilians from the Tatrot Formation
Genus	Species	Location	Stratigraphic position	Material	Notes	Image
cf. Rhamphosuchus	cf. R. sp.	Saketi Beds			A gavialine gavialid.	
Gavialis	G. leptodus	Saketi Beds			A gavialine gavialid.	

==== Turtles ====
Turtles from the Tatrot Formation
Genus	Species	Location	Stratigraphic position	Material	Notes	Image
Pangshura	P. tatrotia	Tatrot Beds			A geoemydine geoemydid.	

==== Birds ====
Birds from the Tatrot Formation
Genus	Species	Location	Stratigraphic position	Material	Notes	Image
Pelecanus	P. sivalensis	Saketi beds		Tarsometatarsus	A pelecanid.	
Anhinga	A. sp.	Saketi beds		Left Tarsometatarsus	A anhingid	
