= Quercylurus =

Quercylurus Temporal range: Early to Late Oligocene (Rupelian to Chattian) 28.8–27.2 Ma

Scientific classification
- Kingdom: Animalia
- Phylum: Chordata
- Class: Mammalia
- Order: Carnivora
- Family: †Nimravidae
- Subfamily: †Nimravinae
- Genus: †Quercylurus
- Species: †Q. major

Binomial name
- †Quercylurus major Ginsburg 1979

Extinct genus of carnivores

Quercylurus is an extinct nimravid carnivora (or "false sabre-toothed cat") from the Early to Late Oligocene of France and Spain. Its fossils were found in Early Oligocene strata in Quercy. It is known with only one species Quercylurus major. Q. major was one of the largest nimravids ever known, as its fossils suggest it was similar in size to the modern-day lion.

Currently there is only one described species within this genus, the type species, Q. major. Q. major lived in the moist and humid forests of Oligocene Europe, alongside the much smaller, fellow nimravid Eofelis.

== Taxonomy ==
Quercylurus was named by Ginsburg (1979), and initially assigned to Felidae by Carroll in 1988. It would be placed as a member of Nimravidae, within the subfamily Nimravinae. Quercylurus was at one point classified as Nimravus intermedius major, and then classed within the Dinailurictis genus. More recent research typically places Quercylurus, Dinailurictis, and Eofelis as closely related, but distinct genera representing a European clade of nimravids. Quercylurus and Dinailurictis in particular share many similarities, with size being the chief distinguishing factor in some research.

== Description ==
Quercylurus is considered the largest Nimravinae known, with remains indicating individuals roughly comparable to modern lions with mass estimates around 200 kg (440 lb); only barbourofelin Barbourofelis fricki grew larger. Quercylurus somewhat resembled actual felines, with an elongated back and shortened snout, whilst having plantigrade limbs. The robust premolars suggests it may have included some bone in its diet.
