= Late Hemingfordian =

The Late Hemingfordian North American Stage on the geologic timescale is the North American faunal stage according to the North American Land Mammal Ages chronology (NALMA), typically set from 20,430,000 to 16,300,000 years BP, a period of 4.1 million years. It is usually considered to overlap the Early Miocene. The Hemingfordian is preceded by the Early Barstovian and followed by the Early Hemingfordian NALMA stages.
