= North American land mammal age =

Geologic timescale for North American fauna

The North American land mammal ages (NALMA) establishes a geologic timescale for North American fauna beginning during the Late Cretaceous and continuing through to the present. These periods are referred to as ages or intervals (or stages when referring to the rock strata of that age) and were established using geographic place names where fossil materials were obtained.

== System ==
The North American land-mammal-age system was formalized in 1941 as a series of provincial land-mammal ages. The system was the standard for correlations in the terrestrial Cenozoic record of North America and was the source for similar time scales dealing with other continents. The system was revised into a formal chronostratigraphic system. This approach is nominally justified by international stratigraphic codes; it holds that first appearances of individual species in particular sections are the only valid basis for naming and defining the land-mammal ages.

The basic unit of measure is the first/last boundary statement. This shows that the first appearance event of one taxon is known to predate the last appearance event of another. If two taxa are found in the same fossil quarry or at the same stratigraphic horizon, then their age-range zones overlap.

The utility of the system led to its expansion into the Cretaceous (formalized 1986) and the Holocene (formalized 2014). These additions have been used in research related to the Cretaceous–Paleogene extinction event and the ensuing recovery, and to the Anthropocene debate, respectively. However, the ages that stretch into the Cretaceous are sometimes referred to as "North American land vertebrate ages" to reflect the fact that mammals, while still abundant, were not the dominant form of terrestrial life during the Mesozoic.

== Ages ==
Some land mammal ages have recognized biochronological subdivisions.

The lower boundary of each age or subdivision is the upper boundary of the next lower age or subdivision.

Age	Subdivision	Lower boundary	Global epoch / stage	Polarity chron(s)	Major events
Cenozoic land mammal ages
Saintaugustinean		0.0004 Ma (1540 CE)	Holocene – Anthropocene	C1n	The Columbian exchange: European colonization introduces domesticated horses, pigs, cattle, and many other non-native organisms into North America
Santarosean		0.014 Ma.	Holocene	C1n	Humans become well-established in North America, bringing domesticated dogs. End of the last ice age. The Late Pleistocene extinctions wipe out many species of megafauna, particularly xenarthrans (glyptodonts, pampatheres, ground sloths), proboscideans (mammoths, mastodons, gomphotheres), carnivorans (short-faced bears, saber-toothed cats, dire wolves), and native horses and camels
Santarosean		0.014 Ma.	Late Pleistocene	C1n	Humans become well-established in North America, bringing domesticated dogs. End of the last ice age. The Late Pleistocene extinctions wipe out many species of megafauna, particularly xenarthrans (glyptodonts, pampatheres, ground sloths), proboscideans (mammoths, mastodons, gomphotheres), carnivorans (short-faced bears, saber-toothed cats, dire wolves), and native horses and camels
Rancholabrean		0.210 Ma.	Late Pleistocene	C1n	The ice age continues. Bison expand south of Alaska alongside other northerly specialists such as caribou, muskoxen, moose, and woolly mammoths.
Rancholabrean		0.210 Ma.	Middle Pleistocene	C1n	The ice age continues. Bison expand south of Alaska alongside other northerly specialists such as caribou, muskoxen, moose, and woolly mammoths.
Irvingtonian		1.4 Ma.	Middle Pleistocene	C1r.2r – C1n	The ice age continues. Mammoths expand south of Alaska.
Irvingtonian		1.4 Ma.	Early Pleistocene	C1r.2r – C1n	The ice age continues. Mammoths expand south of Alaska.
Blancan		4.7 Ma.	Early Pleistocene	C3n – C1r.2r	The cooling climate reaches a tipping point, leading to the start of the Quaternary glaciation (ice age). Modern grasslands, deserts, and tundra are well-established. The Isthmus of Panama fully forms, intensifying the Great American Biotic Interchange. Many North American mammals spread into South America, while terror birds, glyptodonts, and pampatheres spread north. The last North American ailurids (red pandas) and rhinos lived during this age. The last and largest borophagine dogs go extinct. Modern horses (Equus) are abundant. Hyenas make a brief foray into the continent via Asia.
Blancan		4.7 Ma.	Late Pliocene	C3n – C1r.2r	
Blancan		4.7 Ma.	Early Pliocene	C3n – C1r.2r	
Hemphillian		9.4 Ma.	Early Pliocene	C4An – C3n	The last of the Miocene hallmarks (oreodonts, mylagaulids, dromomerycids) die out. Rabbits and short-faced bears diversify. Deer and bovids (sheep and cow relatives) enter the continent from Asia, alongside saber-toothed cats and skunks. Ground sloths enter from South America during an early phase of the Great American Biotic Interchange.
Hemphillian		9.4 Ma.	Late Miocene	C4An – C3n	The last of the Miocene hallmarks (oreodonts, mylagaulids, dromomerycids) die out. Rabbits and short-faced bears diversify. Deer and bovids (sheep and cow relatives) enter the continent from Asia, alongside saber-toothed cats and skunks. Ground sloths enter from South America during an early phase of the Great American Biotic Interchange.
Clarendonian		12.5 Ma.	Late Miocene	C5Ar – C4An	Bear dogs diminish, while "false saber-toothed cats" make a brief comeback in the form of barbourofelids.
Clarendonian		12.5 Ma.	Middle Miocene	C5Ar – C4An	Bear dogs diminish, while "false saber-toothed cats" make a brief comeback in the form of barbourofelids.
Barstovian		16.3 Ma.	Middle Miocene	C5Cn – C5Ar	The Middle Miocene Climatic Optimum gives way to the colder and drier Middle Miocene Climatic Transition. Scrubland spreads through the southwest and forests return to plains as the late Hemingfordian arrivals cement their roles. Proboscideans (elephant relatives, like mastodons and gomphotheres) and mylagaulines become widespread in North America. Grazing horse species become more common than browsing species. Borophagine dogs, amphicyonine "bear-dogs", and hemicyonine "dog-bears" are top predators. Ursine bears and cameline camelids appear.
Hemingfordian		18.5 Ma.	Middle Miocene	C5Er – C5Cn	Savanna and other grassy habitats dominate the landscape. Early-Middle Miocene variants of oreodonts, camels, and rhinos are well-established, though White River hallmarks are practically extinct. Later on, more carnivorans spread into North America, including procyonids (raccoon relatives), ailurids (red panda relatives), amphicyonine "bear dogs", and true cats, which end the "cat gap". Near the end of this age, the Middle Miocene Climatic Optimum leads to a brief resurgence of warm forests.
Hemingfordian		18.5 Ma.	Early Miocene	C5Er – C5Cn	Savanna and other grassy habitats dominate the landscape. Early-Middle Miocene variants of oreodonts, camels, and rhinos are well-established, though White River hallmarks are practically extinct. Later on, more carnivorans spread into North America, including procyonids (raccoon relatives), ailurids (red panda relatives), amphicyonine "bear dogs", and true cats, which end the "cat gap". Near the end of this age, the Middle Miocene Climatic Optimum leads to a brief resurgence of warm forests.
Arikareean		30.0 Ma.	Early Miocene	C11n – C5Er	Temperate forests dominate, but grasses begin to take over the ground cover. The White River fauna is gradually replaced with typical Miocene groups. Extinct mylagaulids ("horned gophers") supplement a growing set of still-living rodent families. Artiodactyl diversity increases with early pronghorns, peccaries, dromomerycids, and synthetoceratines. Chalicotheres briefly enter the continent. Borophagine dogs diversify alongside stem-group mustelids. Native primates, hyaenodonts, and nimravids ("false saber-toothed cats") go extinct, beginning the "cat gap".
Arikareean		30.0 Ma.	Late Oligocene	C11n – C5Er	
Arikareean		30.0 Ma.	Early Oligocene	C11n – C5Er	
Whitneyan	Wh2	31.4 Ma.	Early Oligocene	C12r – C11n	The White River fauna persists, though Eocene rodent families die out as modern rodents cement their roles.
Whitneyan	Wh1	32.0 Ma.	Early Oligocene	C12r	The White River fauna persists, though Eocene rodent families die out as modern rodents cement their roles.
Orellan	Or4	32.5 Ma.	Early Oligocene	C12r	Despite cooling and drying at the Eocene-Oligocene boundary, few North American mammals go extinct at this time. Artiodactyls are abundant. Rhinos are less common than before, but true tapirs appear and horses spread into open habitats. Dogs (particularly hesperocyonines) diversify.
Orellan	Or3	33.1 Ma.	Early Oligocene	C13n – C12r	Despite cooling and drying at the Eocene-Oligocene boundary, few North American mammals go extinct at this time. Artiodactyls are abundant. Rhinos are less common than before, but true tapirs appear and horses spread into open habitats. Dogs (particularly hesperocyonines) diversify.
Orellan	Or2	33.4 Ma.	Early Oligocene	C13n	Despite cooling and drying at the Eocene-Oligocene boundary, few North American mammals go extinct at this time. Artiodactyls are abundant. Rhinos are less common than before, but true tapirs appear and horses spread into open habitats. Dogs (particularly hesperocyonines) diversify.
Orellan	Or1	33.7 Ma.	Early Oligocene	C13r – C13n	Despite cooling and drying at the Eocene-Oligocene boundary, few North American mammals go extinct at this time. Artiodactyls are abundant. Rhinos are less common than before, but true tapirs appear and horses spread into open habitats. Dogs (particularly hesperocyonines) diversify.
Chadronian	Ch4	34.7 Ma.	Late Eocene	C15n – C13r	The White River fauna is in full swing. Modern rodents families (early beavers, squirrels, gophers, cricetids, etc.) replace older, more tropical families. Early relatives of bears, peccaries, and rabbits. The last and largest brontotheres live during this age.
Chadronian	Ch3	35.7 Ma.	Late Eocene	C16n – C15n	The White River fauna is in full swing. Modern rodents families (early beavers, squirrels, gophers, cricetids, etc.) replace older, more tropical families. Early relatives of bears, peccaries, and rabbits. The last and largest brontotheres live during this age.
Chadronian	Ch2	36.5 Ma.	Late Eocene	C16r – C16n	The White River fauna is in full swing. Modern rodents families (early beavers, squirrels, gophers, cricetids, etc.) replace older, more tropical families. Early relatives of bears, peccaries, and rabbits. The last and largest brontotheres live during this age.
Chadronian	Ch1	37.0 Ma.	Late Eocene	C17n – C16r	The White River fauna is in full swing. Modern rodents families (early beavers, squirrels, gophers, cricetids, etc.) replace older, more tropical families. Early relatives of bears, peccaries, and rabbits. The last and largest brontotheres live during this age.
Duchesnean		41.4 Ma.	Middle Eocene	C19n – C17n	Mammals start to more closely resemble the succeeding White River fauna. Early oreodonts, canids (dogs), daphoenine amphicyonids ("bear dogs"), and entelodonts ("hell pigs") evolve or immigrate into North America, while primates decline and Paleocene holdouts such as mesonychians die out.
Uintan	Ui3	42.8 Ma.	Middle Eocene	C20n – C19n	Tropical rainforests begin to break apart into seasonal woodlands. Artiodactyls diversify, with new families related to hippos, camels, and ruminants. Perissodactyls, particularly early rhinos and brontotheres, are still going strong. Older herbivores like taeniodonts and uintatheres die out. The earliest nimravids ("false saber-toothed cats") appear near the end of the Uintan, replacing the last of the oxyaenids.
Uintan	Ui2	45.7 Ma.	Middle Eocene	C20r – C20n	Tropical rainforests begin to break apart into seasonal woodlands. Artiodactyls diversify, with new families related to hippos, camels, and ruminants. Perissodactyls, particularly early rhinos and brontotheres, are still going strong. Older herbivores like taeniodonts and uintatheres die out. The earliest nimravids ("false saber-toothed cats") appear near the end of the Uintan, replacing the last of the oxyaenids.
Uintan	Ui1	46.3 Ma.	Middle Eocene	C21n – C20r	Tropical rainforests begin to break apart into seasonal woodlands. Artiodactyls diversify, with new families related to hippos, camels, and ruminants. Perissodactyls, particularly early rhinos and brontotheres, are still going strong. Older herbivores like taeniodonts and uintatheres die out. The earliest nimravids ("false saber-toothed cats") appear near the end of the Uintan, replacing the last of the oxyaenids.
Bridgerian	Br3	47.0 Ma.	Middle Eocene	C21r – C21n	The Early Eocene Climatic Optimum leads to a "Bridgerian crash", with a temporary reduction of mammal diversity. Even so, perissodactyls, true primates, rodents, and hyaenodonts continue to diversify.
Bridgerian	Br2	49.2 Ma.	Early Eocene	C22n – C21r	The Early Eocene Climatic Optimum leads to a "Bridgerian crash", with a temporary reduction of mammal diversity. Even so, perissodactyls, true primates, rodents, and hyaenodonts continue to diversify.
Bridgerian	Br1b	50.0 Ma.	Early Eocene	C22r – C22n	The Early Eocene Climatic Optimum leads to a "Bridgerian crash", with a temporary reduction of mammal diversity. Even so, perissodactyls, true primates, rodents, and hyaenodonts continue to diversify.
Bridgerian	Br1a	50.1 Ma.	Early Eocene	C23r – C22r	The Early Eocene Climatic Optimum leads to a "Bridgerian crash", with a temporary reduction of mammal diversity. Even so, perissodactyls, true primates, rodents, and hyaenodonts continue to diversify.
Wasatchian	Wa7	52.4 Ma.	Early Eocene	C24n.1r – C23r	The Paleocene-Eocene thermal maximum marks the arrival of more modern mammal groups and the decline of many Paleocene forms. Omomyids (tarsier relatives) and strepsirrhines (lemur relatives) fill in for declining "plesiadapiforms". Rodents diversify, including early relatives of squirrels and beavers. Early perissodactyls (relatives of horses, rhinos, tapirs, brontotheres) appear and begin to diversify. Artiodactyls also appear, though are less common at this time. Hyaenodonts enter the continent.
Wasatchian	Wa6	53.0 Ma.	Early Eocene	C24n.3n – C24n.1r	
Wasatchian	Wa5	53.4 Ma.	Early Eocene	C24r – C24n.3n	
Wasatchian	Wa4	54.1 Ma.	Early Eocene	C24r	
Wasatchian	Wa3	54.4 Ma.	Early Eocene	C24r	
Wasatchian	Wa2	54.7 Ma.	Early Eocene	C24r	
Wasatchian	Wa1	54.9 Ma.	Early Eocene	C24r	
Wasatchian	Wa0	56.0 Ma.	Early Eocene	C24r	
Clarkforkian		57.5 Ma.	Late Paleocene	C25n – C24r	Rodents, tillodonts, and coryphodontids immigrate from Asia. Oxyaenids and nyctitheriids diversify alongside a continued turnover of "plesiadapiform" and "condylarth" groups.
Tiffanian		62.3 Ma.	Late Paleocene	C26r – C25n	"Condylarths" and "plesiadapiforms" experience diversity turnover, with new families supplanting older forms. Pantodonts diversify. Earliest oxyaenids. Near the end of the Tiffanian, uintatheres and arctostylopids immigrate from Asia.
Tiffanian		62.3 Ma.	Middle Paleocene	C26r – C25n	"Condylarths" and "plesiadapiforms" experience diversity turnover, with new families supplanting older forms. Pantodonts diversify. Earliest oxyaenids. Near the end of the Tiffanian, uintatheres and arctostylopids immigrate from Asia.
Torrejonian		65.1 Ma.	Early Paleocene	C28r – C27n	Continued diversification, particularly among "plesiadapiforms" and other primate relatives, alongside new types of "condylarths" such as phenacodontids. Mesonychians become some of the earliest large mammalian carnivores on the continent. Palaeanodonts (pangolin relatives), nyctitheriids (shrew relatives), and viverravids (carnivoran relatives) appear. Some new groups (apatemyids, pantolestids, pantodonts) have no close living relatives.
Puercan		66 Ma.	Early Paleocene	C29r – C28r	Multituberculates, metatherians, and cimolestans survive into the Cenozoic as Cretaceous holdovers. Many new Paleocene mammals appear: taeniodonts, "condylarths" (early hoofed omnivores), and possible primate relatives such as Purgatorius.
Cretaceous land vertebrate ages
Lancian		67 Ma.			
"Edmontonian"		73 Ma.			
Kirtlandian		75 Ma.			
Judithian		79 Ma.			
Wahweapian		82 Ma.			
Aquilian		84 Ma.			

== Other continental ages ==
- European land mammal age
- South American land mammal age
- Asian land mammal age
- African land mammal age

== See also ==
- Appearance Event Ordination
- Biochronology
