= Saketoteron =

Saketoteron Temporal range: Pliocene

Scientific classification
- Kingdom: Animalia
- Phylum: Chordata
- Class: Mammalia
- Infraclass: Placentalia
- Order: Carnivora
- Family: †Nimravidae
- Subfamily: †Nimravinae
- Genus: †Saketoteron; Srivastava & Verma, 1970

Type species
- †Saketoteron tatroinse Srivastava & Verma, 1970

Extinct genus of Nimravidae

Saketoteron is an extinct genus of medium-sized nimravine nimravid that lived in Tatrot Formation of India during Pliocene epoch. The genus is monotypic, containing only one species, Saketoteron tatroinse. The taxon is known from only a partial mandibular ramus that was collected 300 metres south-east of Saketi Village, Himachal Pradesh, India(30.50611°N 77.24667°E).

== History and naming ==
The holotype specimen of Saketoteron, a partial mandibular ramus labelled as GSI type 18513, was discovered near the Saketi Village in Himachal Pradesh, India by the same describers.

They described the partial mandibular ramus as new genus and species of nimravine, Saketoteron tatroinse, where the genus name "Saketo" is after the nearby located Saketi Village, and the species name "tatroinse" is after the Tatrot Formation, the rock unit where its type fossil was discovered.

== Description ==
Saketoteron holotype ramus has typical characteristics of a feliform dentary, lacking P¹ and P² and instead have a smooth diastema between the lower Canine(not preserved in the specimen) and the P³, the dimensions of the P³ tooth are stated to be 15 x 9 mm^{2}.

The holotype has a very well developed P³ tooth and has no flange, characteristics of felids, but the specimen has a curve diastema, which is a unique characteristic present in nimravids but absent in felids, another characteristic is that the ramus has an angulation between the anterior and lateral margins of the jaw, which is again a characteristic present in nimravids, felids may(but at small extent) or may not have this angulation between their anterior and lateral jaw margins, which makes the authors to place this taxon in the subfamily nimravinae, which is currently under the family, nimravidae.

== Classification ==
On the basis of the diagnostic features mentioned by the authors, Saketoteron is currently classified as a part of the subfamily Nimravinae under the family Nimravidae.
