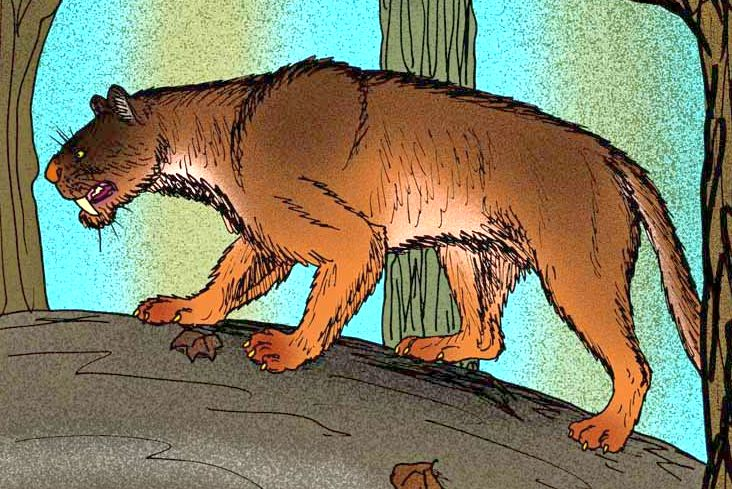
- Artist's reconstruction

Scientific classification
- Kingdom: Animalia
- Phylum: Chordata
- Class: Mammalia
- Infraclass: Placentalia
- Order: Carnivora
- Family: †Nimravidae
- Genus: †Maofelis; Averianov et al., 2016

Type species
- †Maofelis cantonensis Averianov et al., 2016

= Maofelis =

Maofelis Temporal range: Priabonian

Extinct genus of carnivores

Maofelis cantonensis is an extinct basal nimravid from Late Eocene-aged Youganwo Formation of Maoming Basin, Guangdong Province, China.
