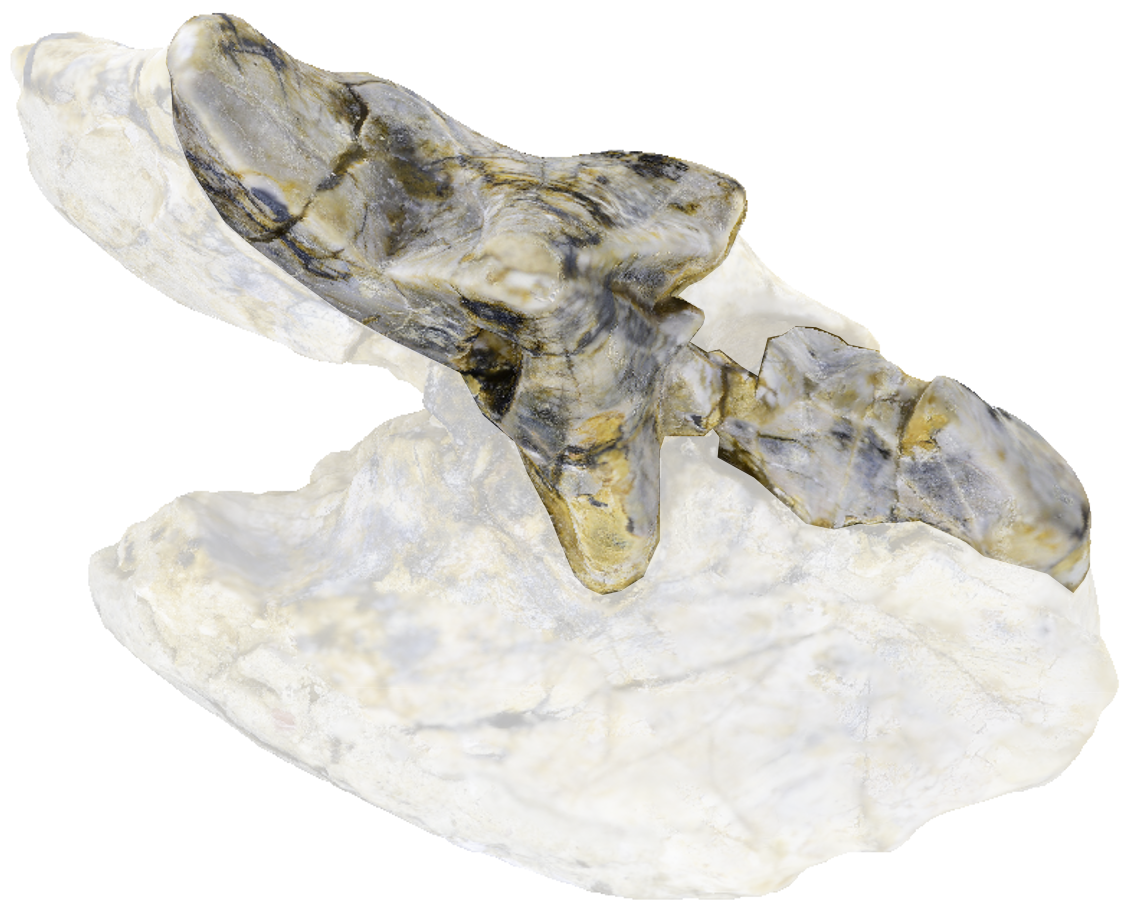
- Premolar teeth of Pangurban holotype in occlusal view

Scientific classification
- Kingdom: Animalia
- Phylum: Chordata
- Class: Mammalia
- Order: Carnivora
- Family: †Nimravidae
- Genus: †Pangurban; Poust et al., 2022

Species
- P. egiae (Poust et al., 2022)

= Pangurban =

Pangurban Temporal range: Late Eocene 40–37 Ma

Extinct genus of carnivores

Pangurban is an extinct genus of the family Nimravidae (the false saber-toothed cats), endemic to North America during the Eocene epoch (40–37 mya). It contains a single species, Pangurban egiae. Occurring several million years before other named nimravids in North America, the discovery of this species suggests that hypercarnivores evolved and spread quickly after the warm middle Eocene.

== Etymology ==
The namesake for the generic name Pangurban comes from the eponymous white cat in the anonymous 9th century Irish poem Pangur Bán. The species name honors scientist Naoko Egi.

== Description ==
P. egiae would have been cat-like in many respects, though since the holotype is incomplete most description would require comparison with close relatives. Using tooth dimensions, the body mass was estimated to be 28 kg (62 lb). The species may have been the size of the smallest mountain lions. Due to the close relationship with the better known nimravid Hoplophoneus, Pangurban may have had a similar appearance with a stocky build and a bony flange in its lower jaw to protect its saber-teeth.
