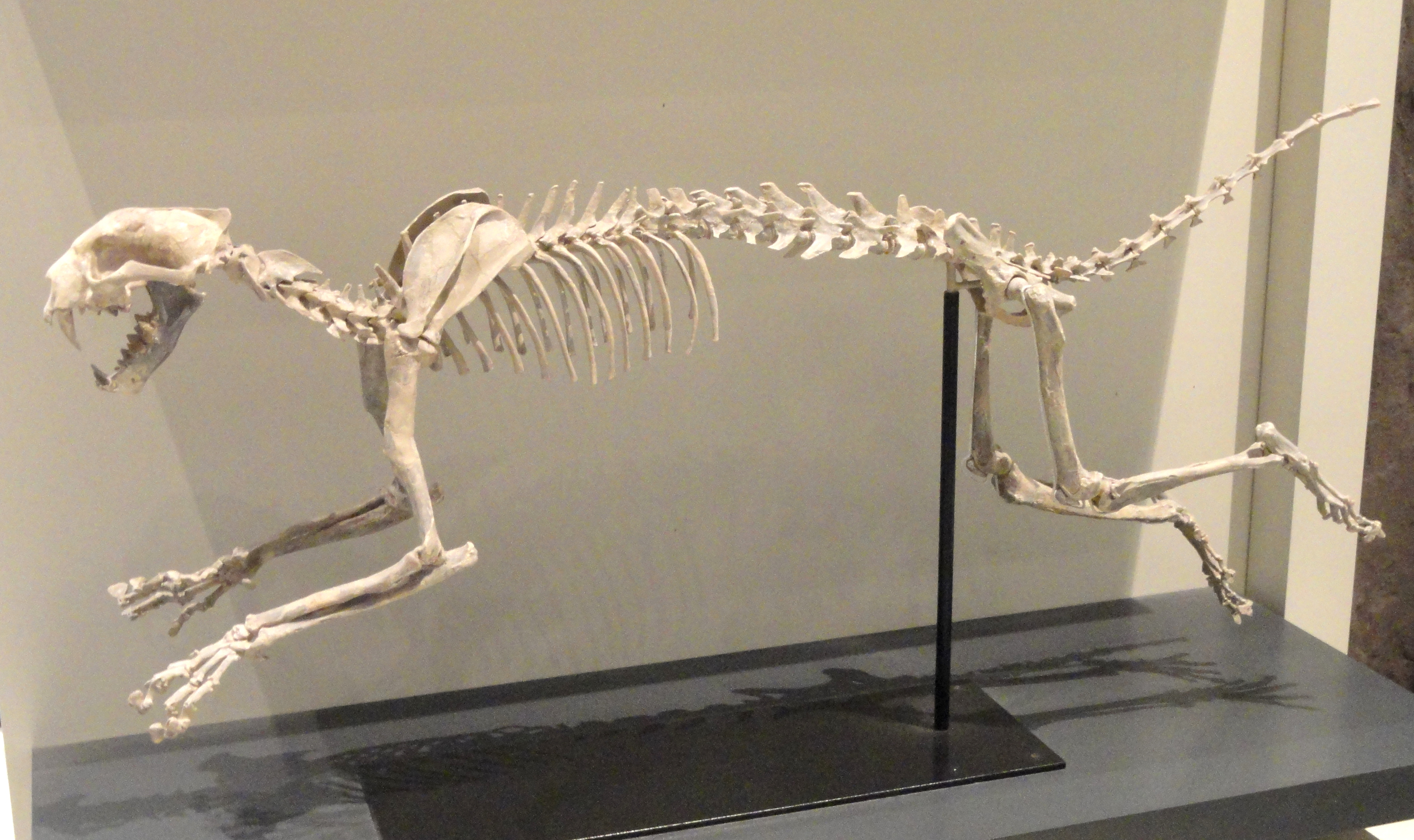
- Skeleton from South Dakota, Royal Ontario Museum, Toronto

Scientific classification
- Kingdom: Animalia
- Phylum: Chordata
- Class: Mammalia
- Order: Carnivora
- Family: †Nimravidae
- Subfamily: †Nimravinae
- Genus: †Dinictis; Leidy, 1854

Type species
- †Dinictis felina Leidy, 1854

= Dinictis =

Dinictis Temporal range: Late Eocene (Chadronian)to Late Oligocene (Arikareean), 35.7–29.5 Ma

Extinct genus of carnivores

Dinictis is a genus of the Nimravidae, an extinct family of feliform mammalian carnivores, also known as "false saber-toothed cats". Assigned to the subfamily Nimravinae, Dinictis was endemic to North America from the Late Eocene to Early Oligocene epochs (35.7—29.5 million years ago), existing for about 6.2 million years. ^{Including supplementary materials}

== Taxonomy ==
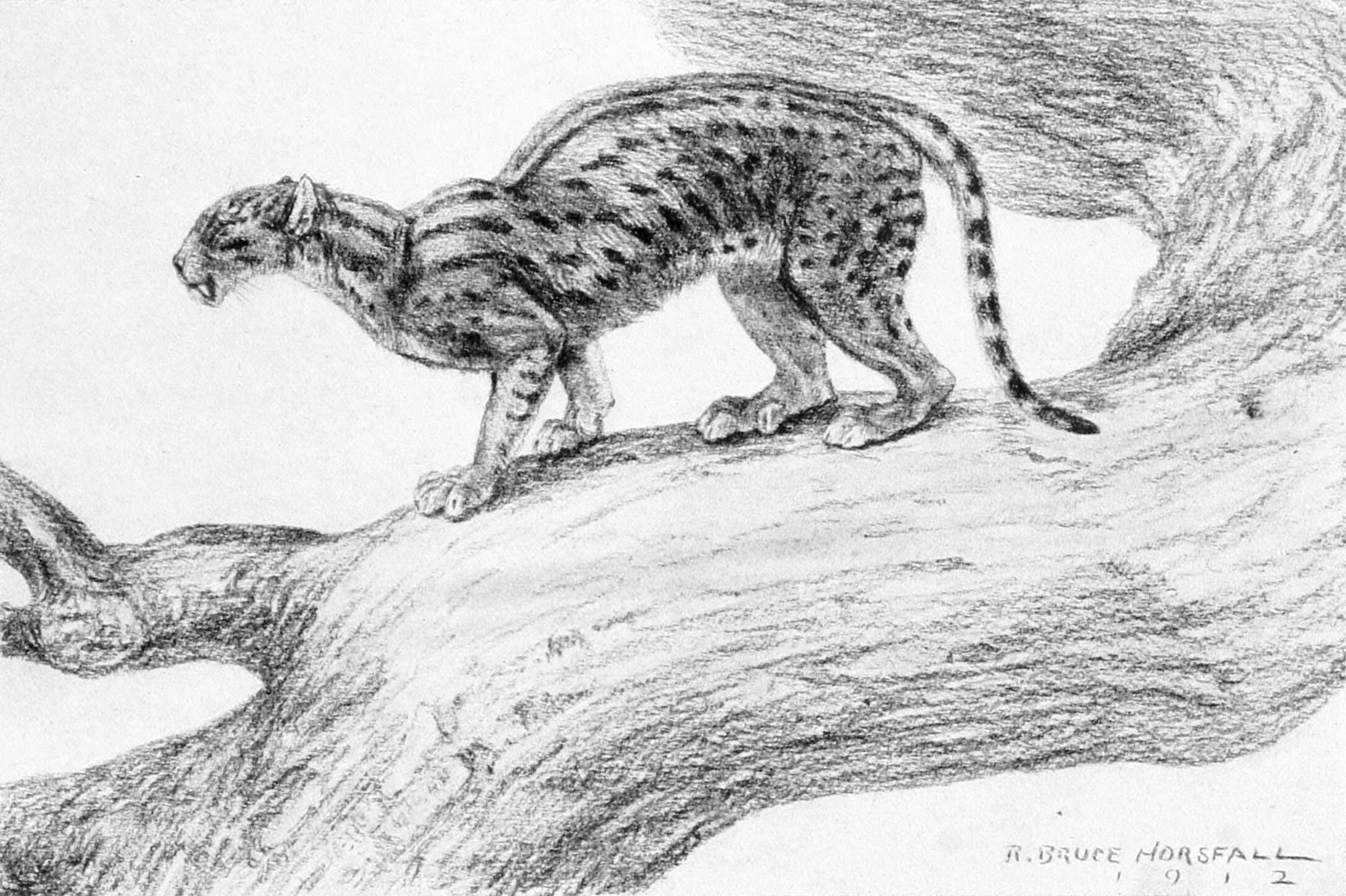
Restoration by Robert Bruce Horsfall

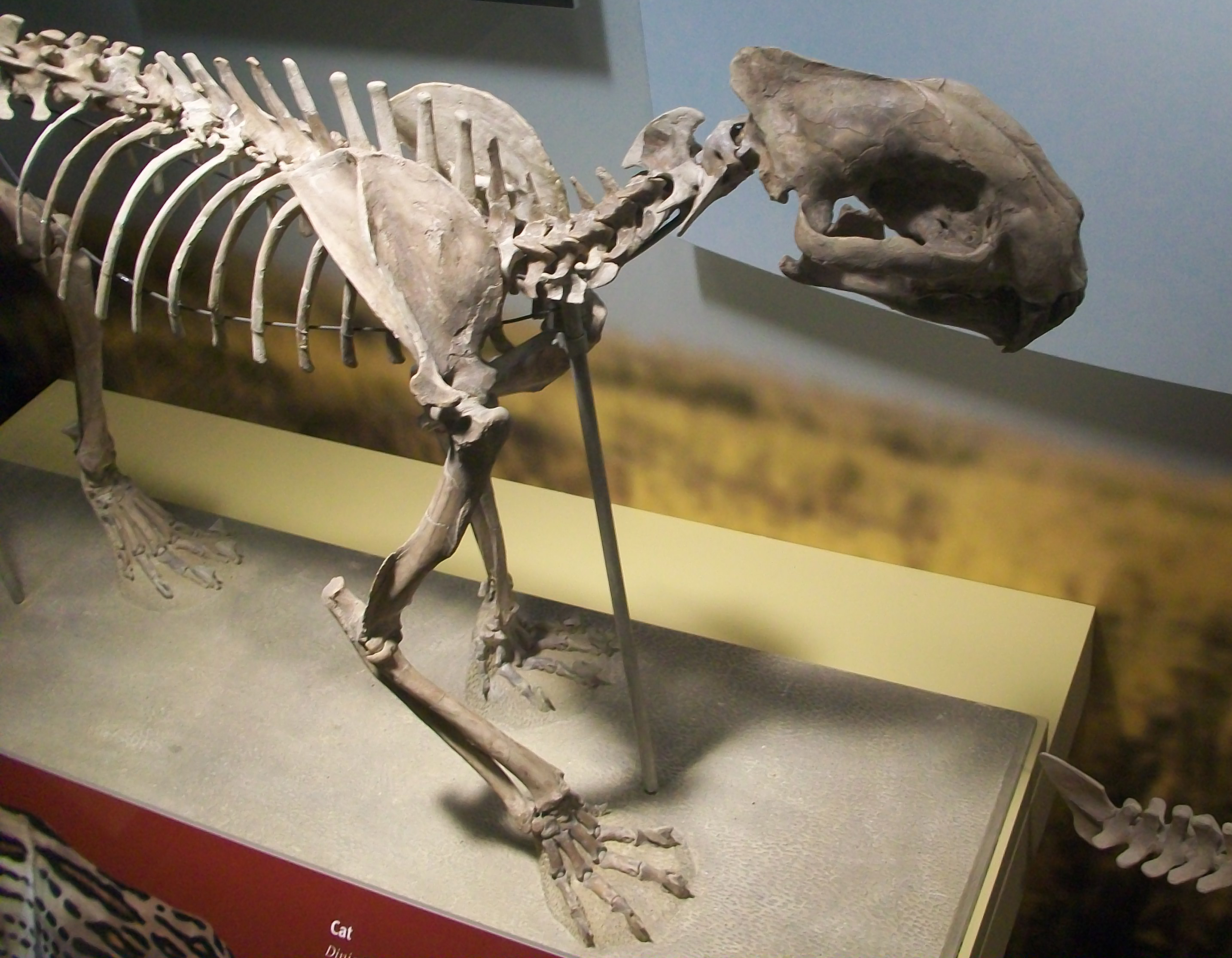
Skeleton in the Field Museum of Natural History

Dinictis was named by American paleontologist Joseph Leidy in 1854. Its type is Dinictis felina. It was assigned to the Nimravidae by Cope (1880); and to the Nimravinae by Flynn and Galiano (1982), Bryant (1991), and Martin (1998).

In a 2016 study, the genus was found to contain only the species Dinictis felina.

== Description ==
Dinictis had a sleek body 1.1 m (3 ft 7 in) long, short legs 45 cm (18 in) high with only incompletely retractable claws, powerful jaws, and a long tail. Dinictis walked plantigrade, unlike modern felids. A 2012 study estimated Dinictis could have weighed around 20 kg (44 lb). The shape of its skull is reminiscent of a felid rather than the extremely short skull of the Machairodontinae. Dinictis possessed an ectotympanic characterised by separated ossified caudal and rostral entotympanic elements. Compared with those of the more recent machairodonts, its upper canines were relatively small, but they nevertheless distinctly protruded from its mouth. Below the tips of the canines, its lower jaw spread out in the form of a lobe.

== Ecology ==
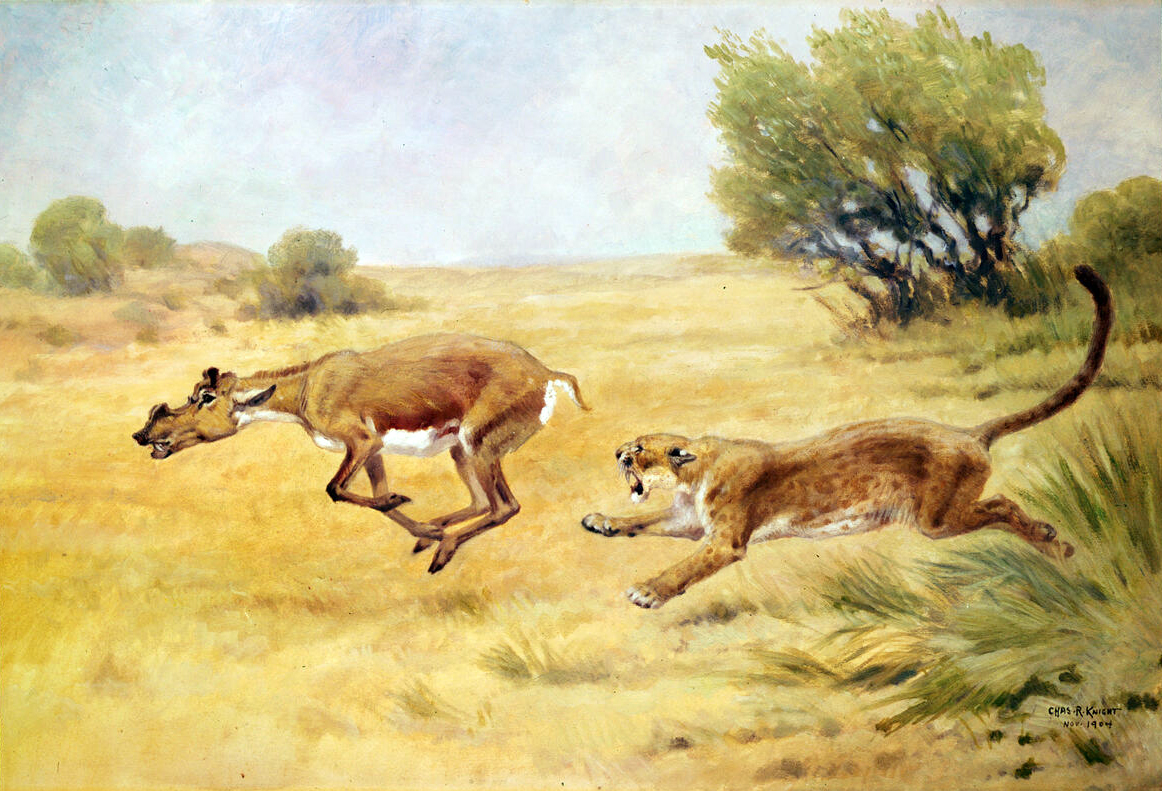
Restoration of Dinictis chasing a Protoceras, Charles R. Knight

Dinictis lived in North America with fossils found in Saskatchewan, Canada and Colorado, Montana, Nebraska, South Dakota, North Dakota, Wyoming, and Oregon in the United States. ^{Including supplementary materials} Fossil evidence suggests Hyenaodon horridus may have occasionally predated on Dinictis.
