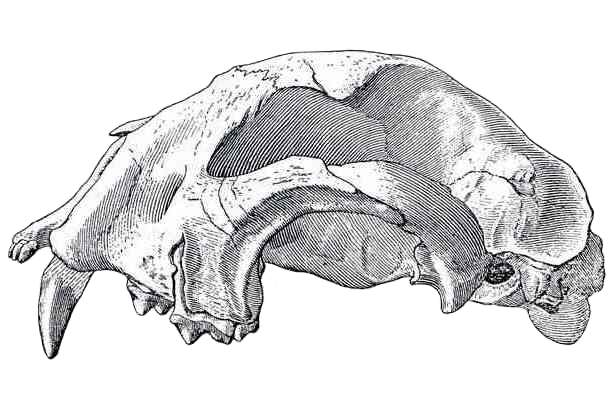
- Holotype skull

Scientific classification
- Kingdom: Animalia
- Phylum: Chordata
- Class: Mammalia
- Order: Carnivora
- Family: †Nimravidae
- Subfamily: †Nimravinae
- Genus: †Dinaelurus; Eaton, 1922
- Species: †D. crassus

Binomial name
- †Dinaelurus crassus Eaton, 1922

= Dinaelurus =

Dinaelurus Temporal range: Early to Late Oligocene (Rupelian to Chattian), 32.6–27.2 Ma

Extinct genus of carnivores

Dinaelurus is a genus of the Nimravidae, an extinct family of feliform mammalian carnivores, also known as "false saber-toothed cats". Assigned to the subfamily Nimravinae, Dinaelurus was endemic to North America during the Oligocene epoch (32.6—27.2 mya), existing for approximately 5.4 million years. ^{Including supplementary materials}

== Taxonomy ==
Dinaelurus was named by George Francis Eaton in 1922, with a single species, Dinaelurus crassus. It was assigned to Nimravinae by Flynn and Galiano in 1982. One specimen was found in the John Day Formation in Oregon.

== Description ==
Dinaelurus had a skull extremely broad for its length and had conical teeth; it exhibited little or no development of sabertooth features and had more rounded cheek teeth with no serrated ridges. It had a relatively gracile skeleton and may have had digitigrade feet. It is believed that Dinaelurus was a cursorial predator that ran down its prey. This is suggested by the nimravid's short face and large nostrils, similar to those of a cheetah, which is also a cursorial predator.

== Sources ==
- https://web.archive.org/web/20080620030107/http://home.earthlink.net/~ratha13/id5.html
