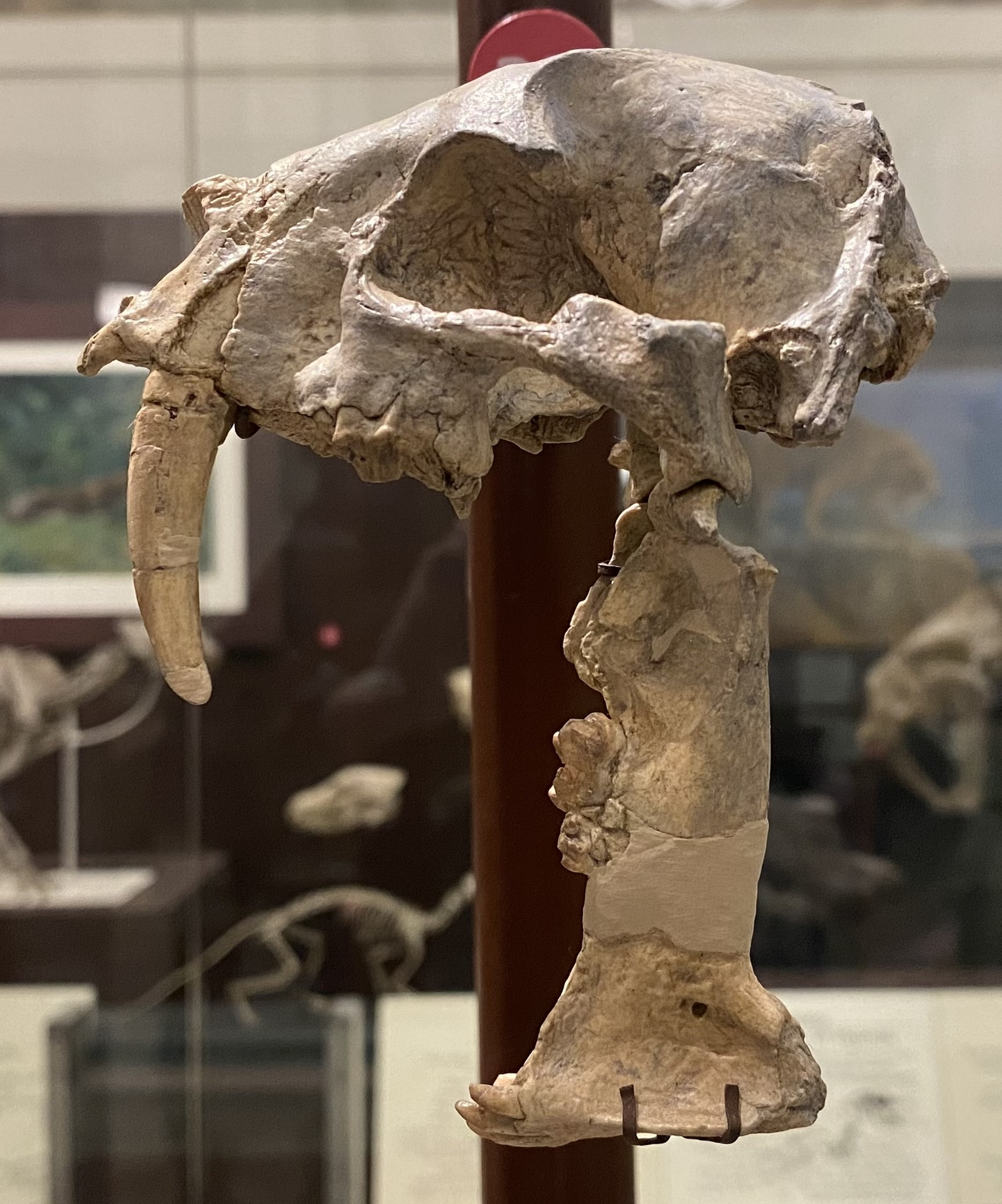
- Skull cast of Eusmilus olsontau at the American Museum of Natural History

Scientific classification
- Kingdom: Animalia
- Phylum: Chordata
- Class: Mammalia
- Order: Carnivora
- Family: †Nimravidae
- Subfamily: †Hoplophoninae
- Genus: †Eusmilus; Gervais, 1876

Type species
- Machairodus bidentatus Filhol, 1873

Other Species
- E. adelos Barrett, 2021; E. cerebralis Cope, 1880; E. dakotensis Hatcher, 1895; E. sicarius Sinclair and Jepsen, 1927; E. villebramarensis Peigné and Brunet, 2003

= Eusmilus =

Eusmilus Temporal range: Late Eocene to Early Oligocene, (Priabonian to Rupelian) 34.7–29.5 Ma

Extinct genus of carnivores

Eusmilus ('true sabre') is a prehistoric genus of nimravid that lived in Europe and North America during the Late Eocene to Early Oligocene epochs (34.7–29.5 mya).

== Taxonomy ==
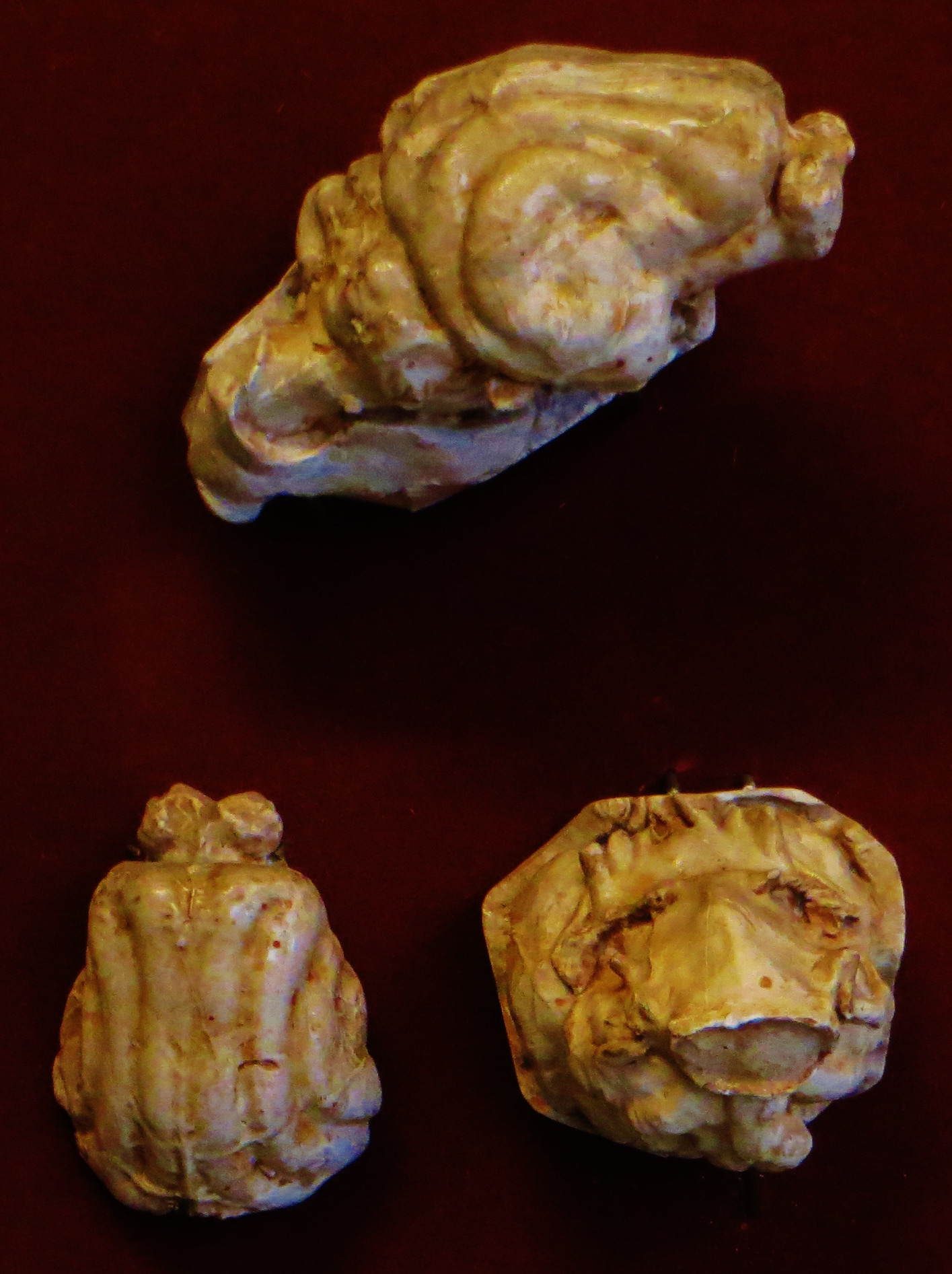
E. bidentatus brain endocasts

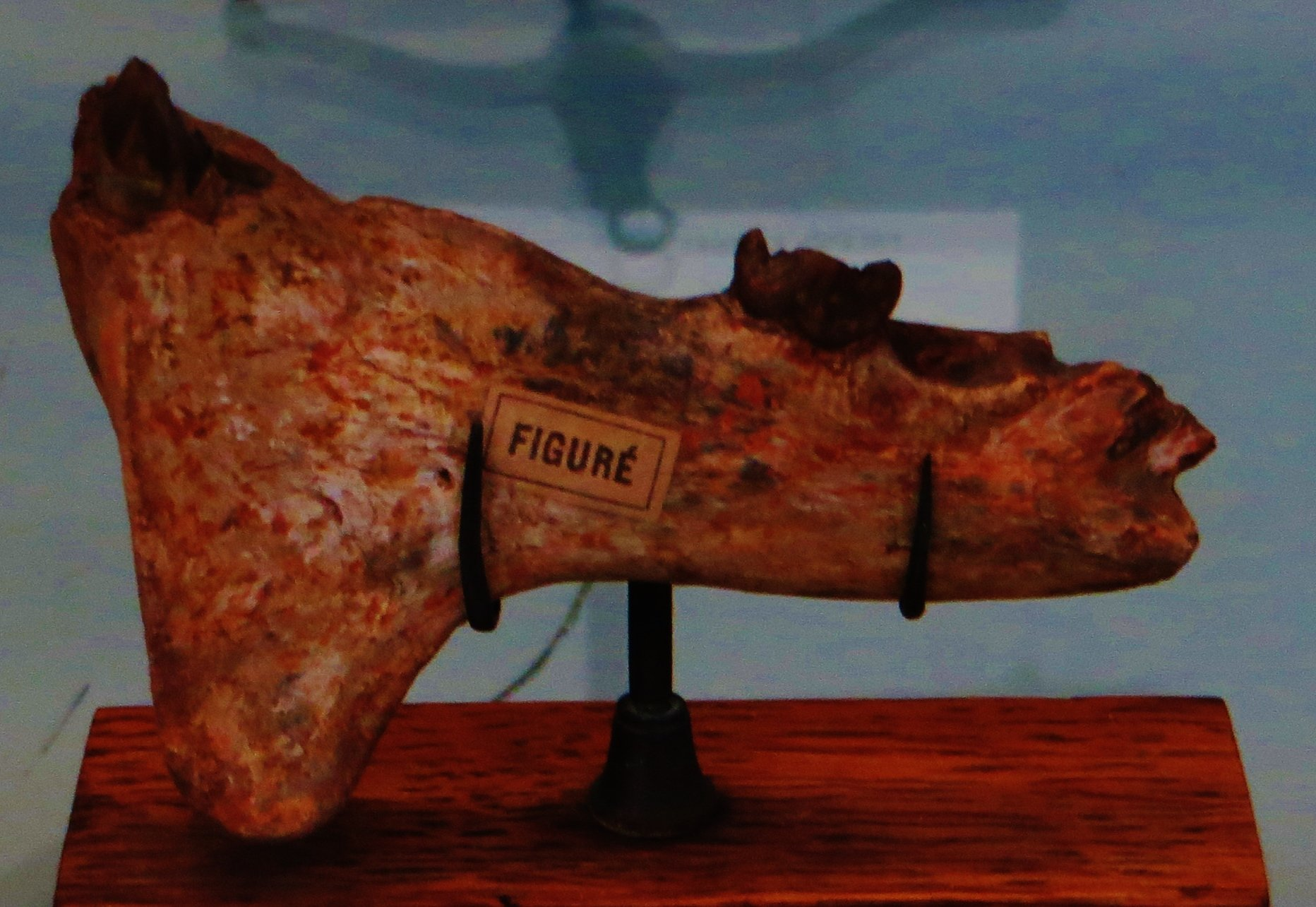
Jaw of E. bidentatus

There are at least three valid species of Eusmilus, E. bidentatus and E. villebramarensis. Ekgmoiteptecela MacDonald, 1963 was synonymized with Eusmilus by some authors, but is actually synonymous with Hoplophoneus. The third species, E. adelos, was described in 2021, and stands as the largest species in the genus.

One study performed in 2016 moved all North American species to Hoplophoneus.

The discovery of E. adelos, meanwhile, suggests that nimravids went along derived evolutionary pathways; conical-toothed, dirk-toothed, and scimitar-toothed, and that their evolutionary paths split in two, leading to saber-toothed and conical-tooth forms that convergently evolved with those of true felids tens of millions of years later. Its discovery also suggests that several species of Hoplophoneus were actually species of Eusmilus genus instead, increasing the total number of species to six.

== Description ==
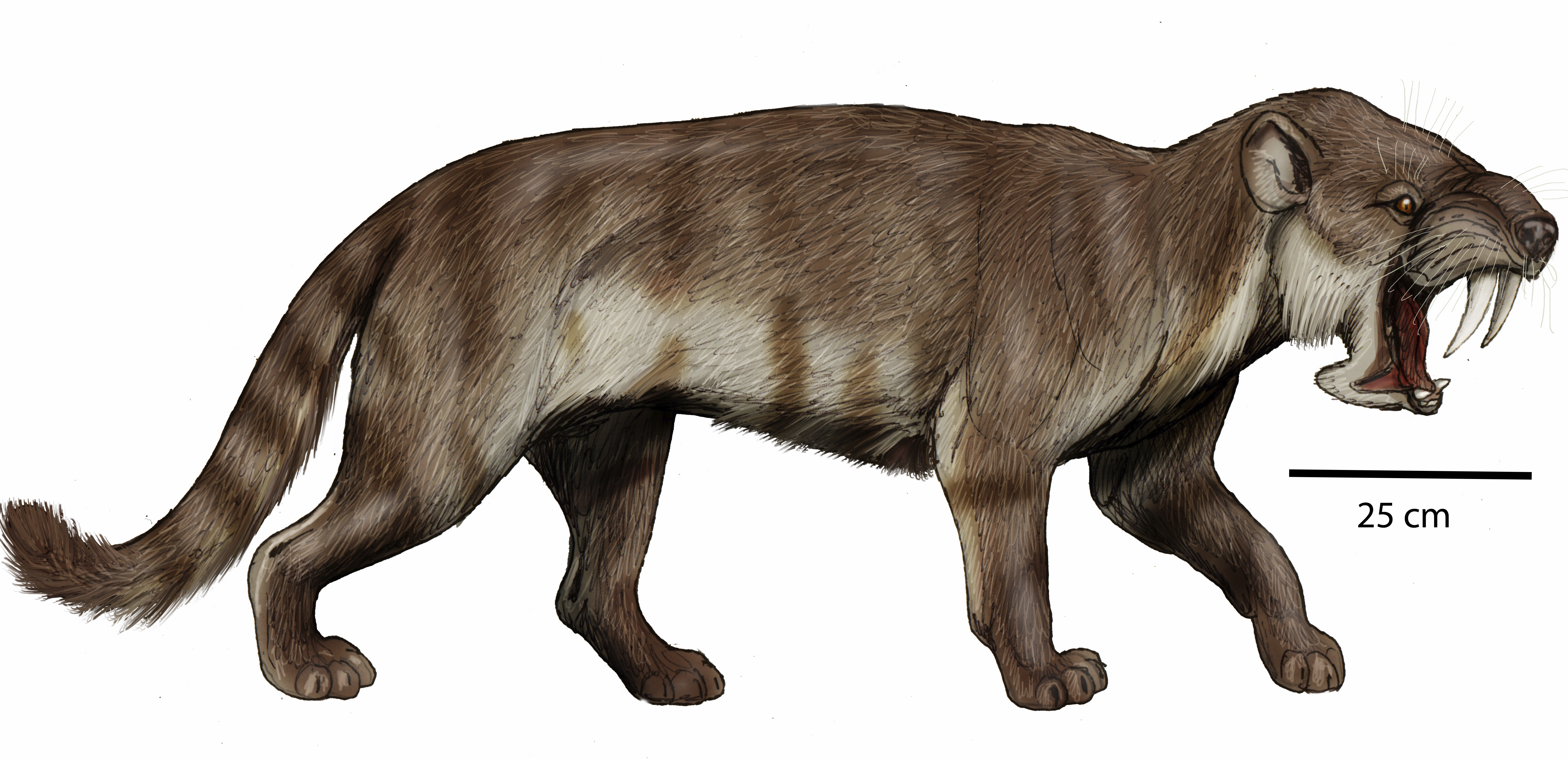
Life reconstruction of E. adelos

E. bidentatus was estimated to have weighed 10.2 kg (22 lb), making it no larger than a lynx, and is estimated at a shoulder height of 45 cm (1 ft 6 in). E. cerebralis is considered to have been similar in size to a bobcat. E. sicarius was considerably larger than the aforementioned species, being about the size of a large leopard. The largest species within the genus, E. adelos, was similar in size to a small lion, estimated to have weighed 111 kg (245 lb). This makes it the largest hoplophoneinae nimravid and one of the largest nimravids known, just behind Dinailurictis, Quercylurus, and Barbourofelis.

Eusmilus had developed long saber teeth and looked like a saber-toothed cat, but was actually a so-called '"false saber-tooth"' and only bore this resemblance convergently. E. sicarius had very large upper canines and a massive flange at the front of the lower jaw, compared to Hoplophoneus.

Eusmilus had lost many other teeth, possessing only 26 instead of the 44 usually seen in carnivore mammals. The bony flanges projected from Eusmilus ' lower jaw to protect the sabers (this is also seen in the unrelated marsupial Thylacosmilus and felid Megantereon).

== Paleobiology ==
=== Growth and development ===
Eusmilus cubs and adolescents have been discovered, and examinations of their skeletons indicates that their saber-teeth emerged late in life, indicating the animals were dependent on their mothers for a relatively long period. The milk teeth of Eusmilus, upon their eruption, were large enough to allow it to hunt effectively. The added advantage of these milk sabers was that because of the late growth of the permanent sabers, if the milk saber-teeth were damaged, the nimravid had a chance to grow a new set of saber-teeth, allowing it to continue hunting.

=== Predatory behavior ===
Barrett speculated the E. adelos could have hunted rhinoceratids, antelopes, suids, tapirids, and anthracotheriids, due to its large size. Lautenschlager et al. 2020 estimated that Eusmilus had a jaw gape of 89.13°, 102.87°, 106.30°, and 107.32° for E. sicarius, E. cerebralis, E. dakotensis, and E. bidentatus. Due to its actual jaw gape being over 90 degrees, the authors suggest it may have had a specialization towards larger bodied prey. ^{Including supplementary materials} There is fossil evidence of conflict between Eusmilus and Nimravus, another genus of nimravid.

Analysis on the elbow morphology suggests Eusmilus shows relative cursoriality compared to other nimravids. E. adelos was recovered as a pounce-pursuit predator, which may have been an adaptation for open habitats. On the other hand, E. cerebralis was recovered as an ambush predator, but was found in localities that borders woodland and shrub environments, suggesting it lived in more open environments than other sympatric nimravids.

=== Possible footprints ===
JODA feliform footprints from John Day Formation, is thought to have belong to E. cerebralis.
