= Whitneyan =

North American faunal stage

The Whitneyan North American Stage on the geologic timescale is the North American faunal stage according to the North American Land Mammal Ages chronology (NALMA), set from 32.0 to 30.0 million years ago. It falls within the Early Oligocene. The Whitneyan is preceded by the Orellan and followed by the Arikareean NALMA stages.

== Ecology ==
The Whitneyan saw a minor decline in the diversity of feeding adaptations among North American predators. The main cause of this was the disappearance of a number of nimravids and hyaenodonts that were highly specialist carnivores combined with the appearance of a number of generalist, omnivorous canids.
