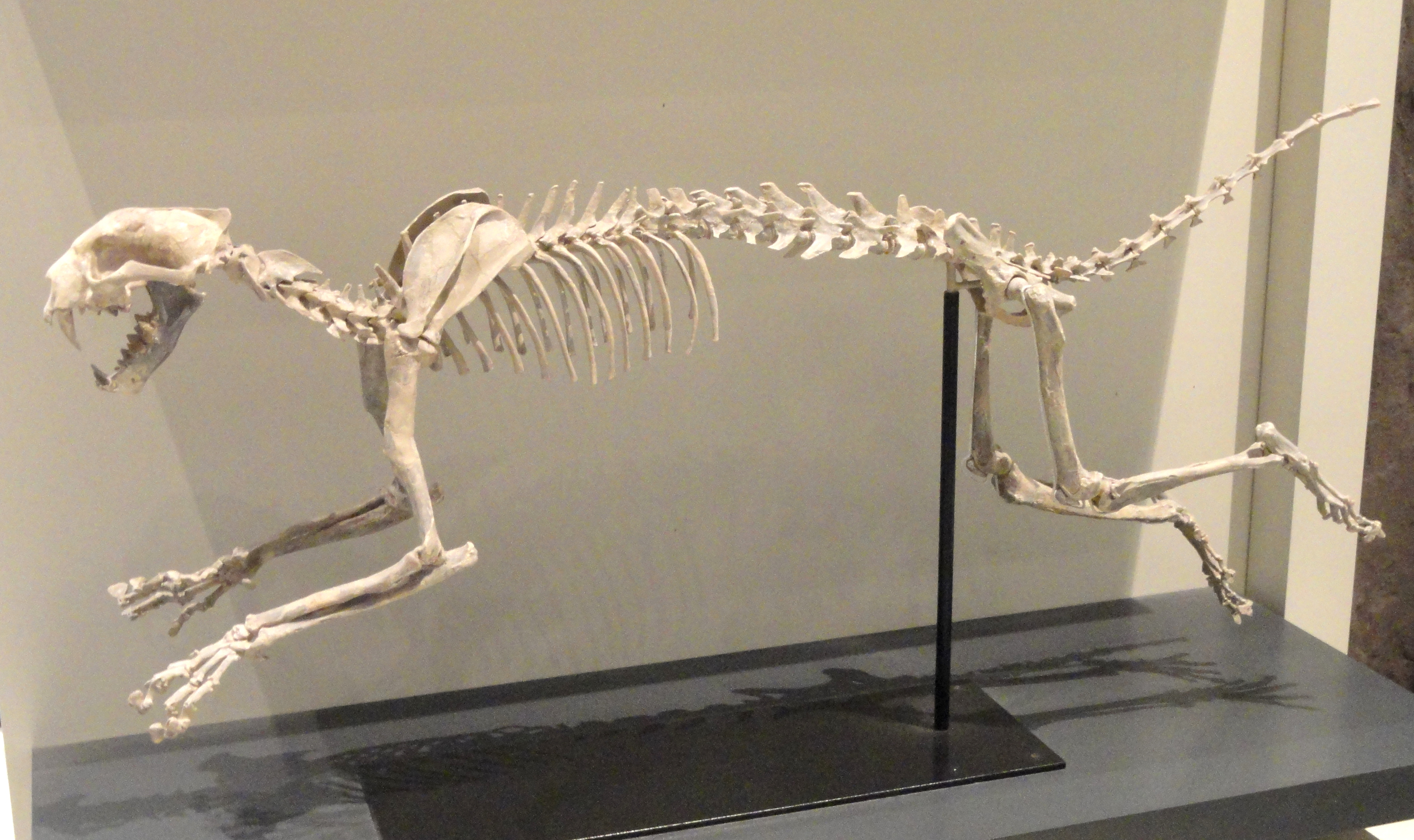
- Dinictis skeleton from South Dakota, displayed at the Royal Ontario Museum, Toronto

Scientific classification
- Kingdom: Animalia
- Phylum: Chordata
- Class: Mammalia
- Order: Carnivora
- Suborder: Feliformia
- Superfamily: †Nimravoidea
- Family: †Nimravidae
- Subfamily: †Nimravinae; Cope, 1880

Genera
- †Dinictis; †Dinaelurus; †Dinailurictis; †Eofelis; †Nimravus; †Pogonodon; †Quercylurus; †Taotienimravus

= Nimravinae =

Nimravinae Temporal range: Late Eocene (Bartonian) – Late Oligocene (Chattian) 35.37–25.9 Ma

Extinct subfamily of carnivores

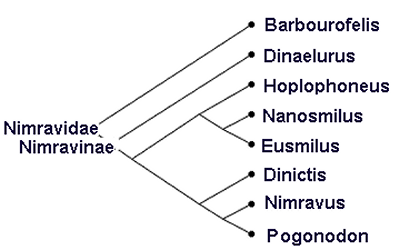
Nimravidae cladogram

The Nimravinae are a subfamily of the Nimravidae, an extinct family of feliform mammalian carnivores, sometimes known as false saber-toothed cats. They were found in Eurasia and North America from the Late Eocene through the Late Oligocene epochs (Bartonian through Chattian stages, 35.37—25.9 mya), spanning about 17.37 million years. ^{Including supplementary materials} Centered in North America, the radiation of the Nimravinae from the Eocene to Oligocene was the first radiation of cat-like carnivorans. This subfamily would later disperse into Africa and gave rise to Barbourofelinae.
