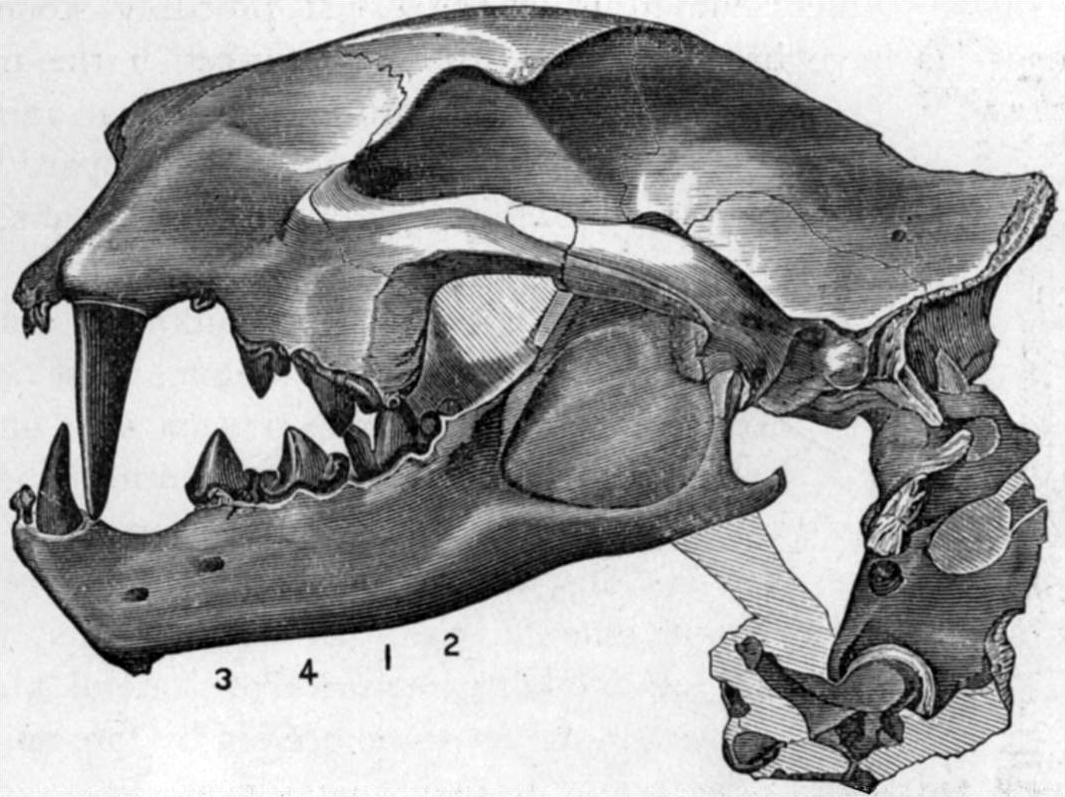
- N. brachyops skull

Scientific classification
- Kingdom: Animalia
- Phylum: Chordata
- Class: Mammalia
- Order: Carnivora
- Family: †Nimravidae
- Subfamily: †Nimravinae
- Genus: †Nimravus; Cope, 1879

Type species
- †Nimravus brachyops Cope, 1879

Other species
- N. intermedius Filhol, 1872

= Nimravus =

Nimravus Temporal range: Late Eocene to Late Oligocene (Priabonian to Chattian) 35.3–27.1 Ma

Extinct genus of carnivores

Nimravus is an extinct genus of "false" saber-toothed cat that lived in North America and Eurasia during the Eocene and Oligocene epochs 35.3—27.1 mya, existing for approximately 7.9 million years. Not closely related to true saber-toothed cats, they evolved a similar form through parallel evolution. Fossils have been uncovered from western U.S. from Oregon to Southern California and Nebraska, and also from Eurasia from France to Mongolia.

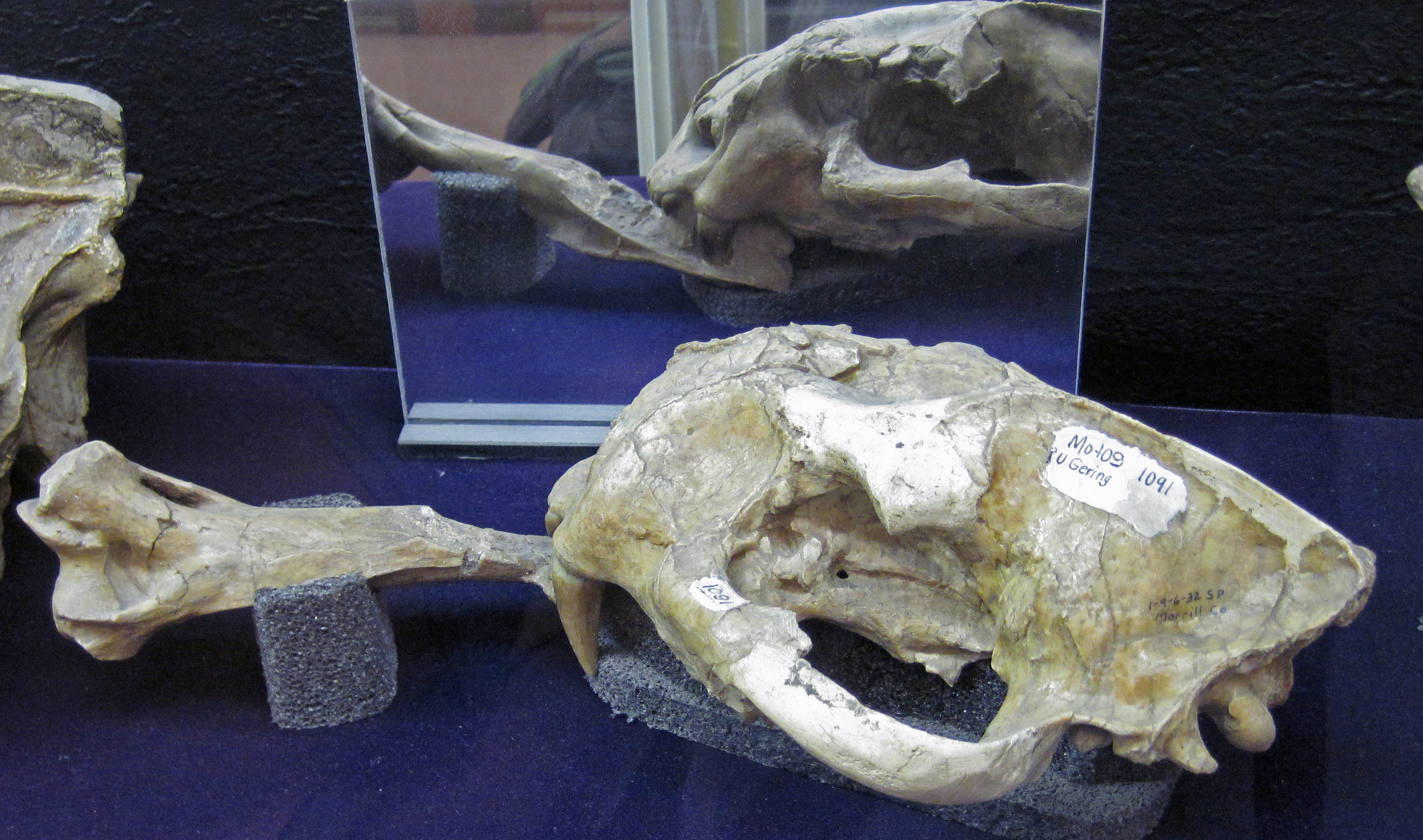
N. brachyops skull with canines piercing the leg bone of another specimen

== Description ==
Nimravus was around 1.2 metres (4 ft) in body length. With its sleek body, it may have resembled the modern caracal, although it had a longer back and more dog-like feet with partially retractile claws. It probably hunted birds and small mammals, ambushing them like modern cats, rather than chasing them down. Nimravus competed with other false sabre-tooths such as Hoplophoneus.

== Palaeobiology ==
=== Locomotion ===
Nimravus brachyops possessed an exceptionally high ankle gear ratio, which indicates that its foot extension performance emphasised speed over strength and would have made it capable of running at considerable velocities.

=== Palaeopathology ===
A Nimravus skull, found in North America, had been pierced in the forehead region, the hole exactly matching the dimensions of the sabre-like canine of Eusmilus. This particular individual of Nimravus apparently survived this encounter, as the wound showed signs of healing. Another Nimravus fossil from Nebraska was described in 1959 by paleontologist Loren Toohey, and comprises a Nimravus skull with saber-teeth embedded into the humerus of another Nimravus, indicating a fatal incident of intraspecific combat.

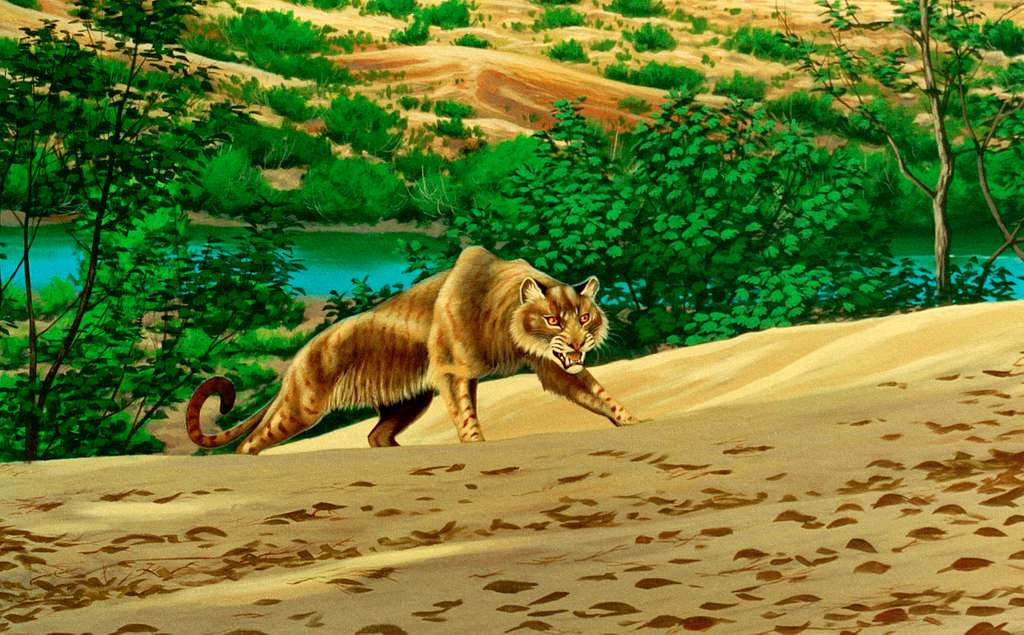
Life Restoration of Nimravus
