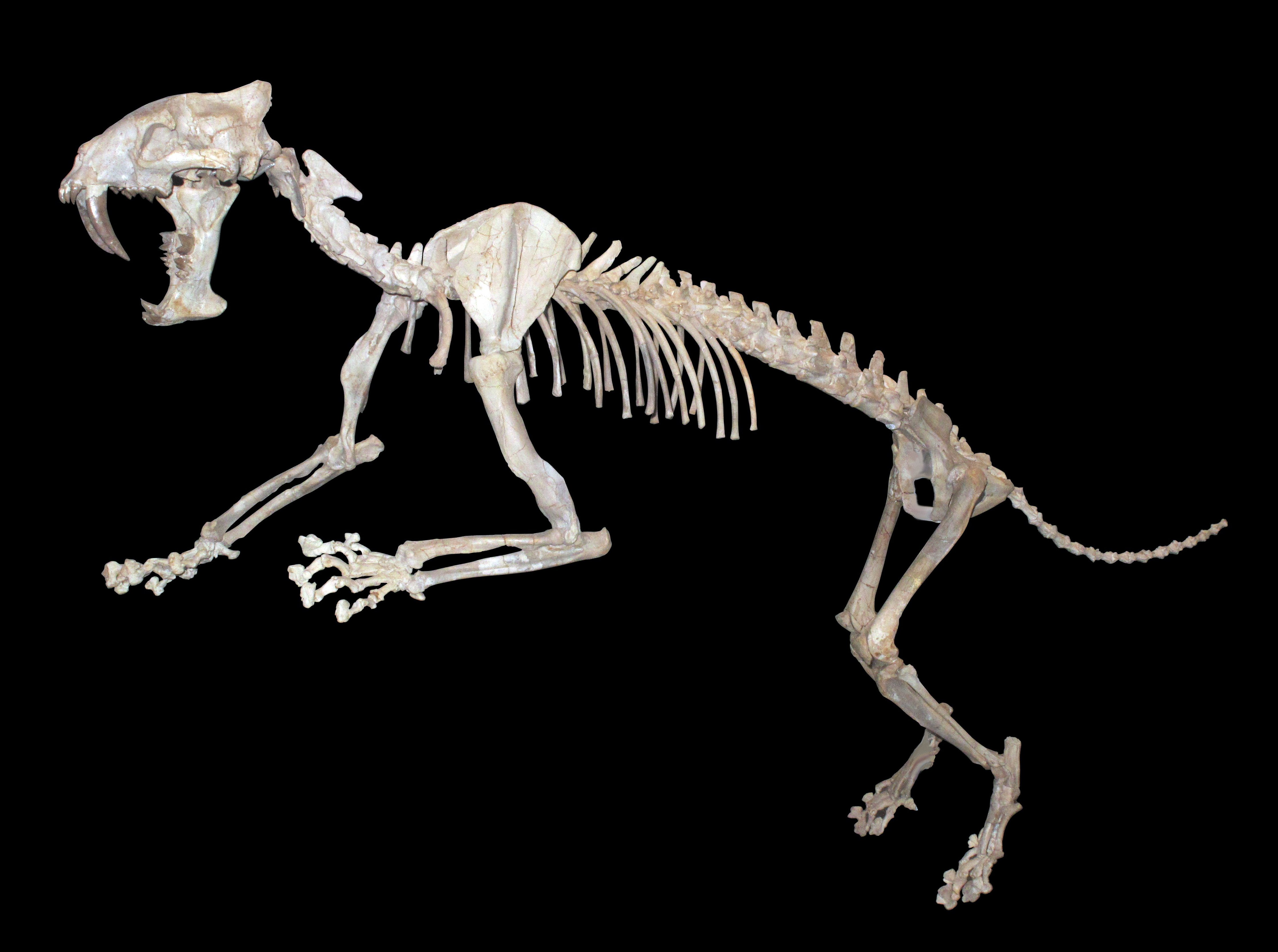
- H. primaevus skeleton, Zurich natural history museum

Scientific classification
- Kingdom: Animalia
- Phylum: Chordata
- Class: Mammalia
- Order: Carnivora
- Family: †Nimravidae
- Subfamily: †Hoplophoninae
- Genus: †Hoplophoneus; Cope, 1874

Type species
- Hoplophoneus primaevus Leidy, 1851

Other Species
- H. oharrai (Jepsen, 1926); H. occidentalis (Leidy, 1866)

Synonyms
- H. occidentalis: Dinotomius atrox Williston, 1895; Drepanodon occidentalis Leidy, 1866; Machairodus occidentalis Leidy, 1866; H. primaevus: Hoplophoneus mentalis Sinclair, 1921; Hoplophoneus oreodontis Cope, 1874

= Hoplophoneus =

Hoplophoneus Temporal range: Late Eocene to Early Oligocene (Priabonian to Rupelian) 35.7–30.5 Ma

Extinct genus of carnivores

Hoplophoneus is an extinct genus of saber-toothed carnivoran belonging to the family Nimravidae, sometimes known as false saber-toothed cats. The titular member of the subfamily Hoplophoninae, it is closely related to nimravids such as Eusmilus and Nanosmilus. Hoplophoneus lived in North America and Asia during the Late Eocene to Early Oligocene epochs from 35.7 to 30.5 mya, existing for approximately 5.2 million years. ^{Including supplementary materials} The genus currently consists of three named species: H. oharri, H. occidentalis, and H. primaveus.

== Taxonomy ==
H. strigidens was considered nomen dubium by Bryant in 1996. In 2000, an unnamed species of Hoplophoneus was found within late Eocene rocks of Thailand.

In 2016, all North American species of Eusmilus were placed in Hoplophoneus by Paul Z. Barrett. In addition, it was found that H. mentalis was a junior synonym of H. primaevus. However, in 2021, Barret revised this phylogeny. His phylogenetic analysis suggests H. cerebralis, H. dakotensis, and H. sicarius were actually species of Eusmilus instead of Hoplophoneus. A 2025 study recovered Hoplophoenus as paraphyletic genus.

== Description ==
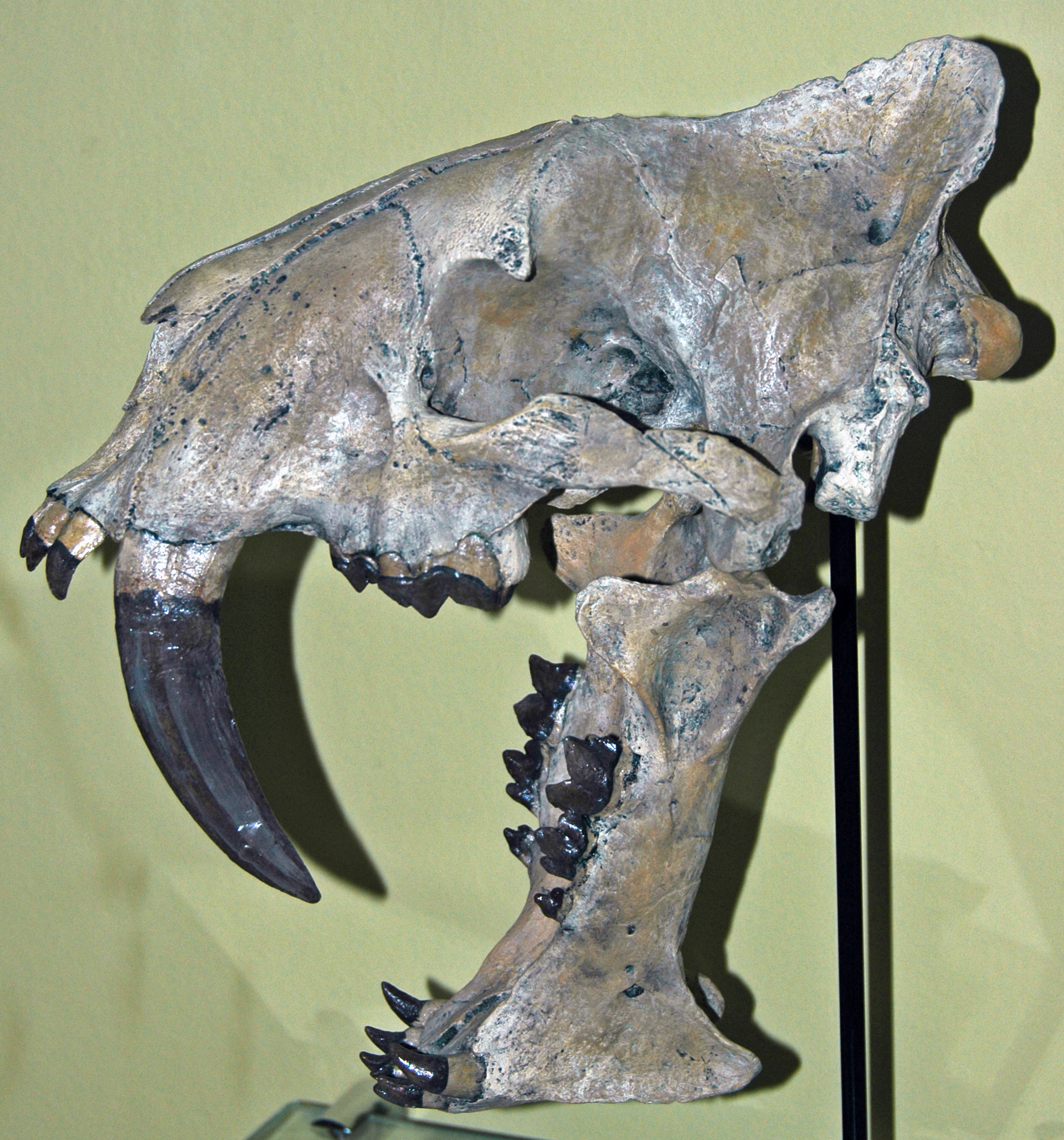
H. occidentalis skull

Hoplophoneus, though not a true felid, was similar to cats in outward appearance. Hoplophoneus showed adaptations of high specialization, such as the development of its canines and mandibular flange and overall robustness of its build. The humerus of Hoplophoneus showed prominent areas for insertion of deltoid and supinatory muscles, resembling that of later barbourofelins and thylacosmilids. H. primaevus is estimated to have weighed 15–19.5 kg (33–43 lb) and stood 48 cm (1 ft 7 in) at the shoulders. H. occidentalis was significantly larger than H. primaevus, standing 60 cm (2 ft 0 in). While Sorkin, in his 2008 study, estimated the species could've weighed 160 kg (350 lb), similar to a large jaguar. Other experts suggested a smaller size. Turner suggested H. occidentalis was about the size of a large leopard. Based on a sample size of 8 specimens, Meachen found that the species weighed 65 kg (140 lb). This species was also found to have been sexually dimorphic.

== Paleobiology ==
=== Brain anatomy ===
The posterior vermis of the cerebellum was found to be straight, although the overlap of the cerebellum by the cerebrum was smaller than extant felids. It was also found that the olfactory bulbs were relatively small in Hoplophoneus. Despite this, H. primaevus was found have an encephalization quotient score of 0.36-0.37. This EQ score is similar to that of cougars, and scoring higher than jaguars.

=== Predatory behavior ===
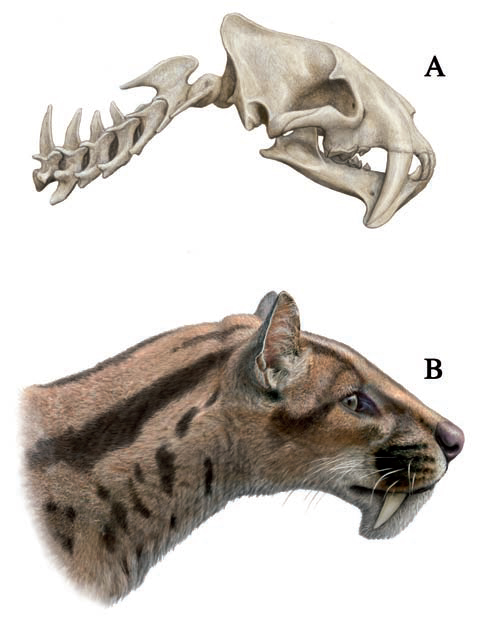
Reconstruction by Mauricio Antón

Hoplophoneus was found to have humeri as robust and deltopectoral crests as long as Oxyaeninae and Borhyaenoidea. This suggests much like oxyaenines and borhyaenoids, Hoplophoneus possessed a more robust humeri than any felid. Due to the presence of robust bones and large areas of muscle attachments, Meachen speculated that H. occidentalis showed specialization for large prey. Lautenschlager et al. 2020 estimated the jaw gape for this species to be around 98.22°. In addition, H. oharri and H. primaveus had a jaw gape of 97° and 95° respectively. They argue due to the wide jaw gape of over 90°, combined with little bending strength values over time suggests they have an intermediate killing strategy towards large prey. ^{Including supplementary materials}

However, Anderson et al. 2011 found that increased jaw gape and canine size has a great impact on small to medium sized prey, but little impact on large prey. Based on their analysis, they argue the adaptation of sabertoothed predators was killing normal sized prey faster than their nonsabertooth counterparts. Elbow morphology recovered Hoplophoneus as an ambush predator.

=== Pathology ===
An adult specimen of H. primaevus discovered in Badlands National Park, South Dakota, in 2010 by paleontologist Clint Boyd et al. was found to have bite marks on its skull from the teeth of another adult individual of Hoplophoneus. From examination of the wounds, it was found that the animal had been wounded by its rival's saber-teeth. Regrowth of bone around the injuries shows that the nimravid survived the attack. Similar finds also reveal that such fights were likely common among nimravids and that they would often aim for the back of the skulls and eyes of their opponents.

== Paleoecology ==
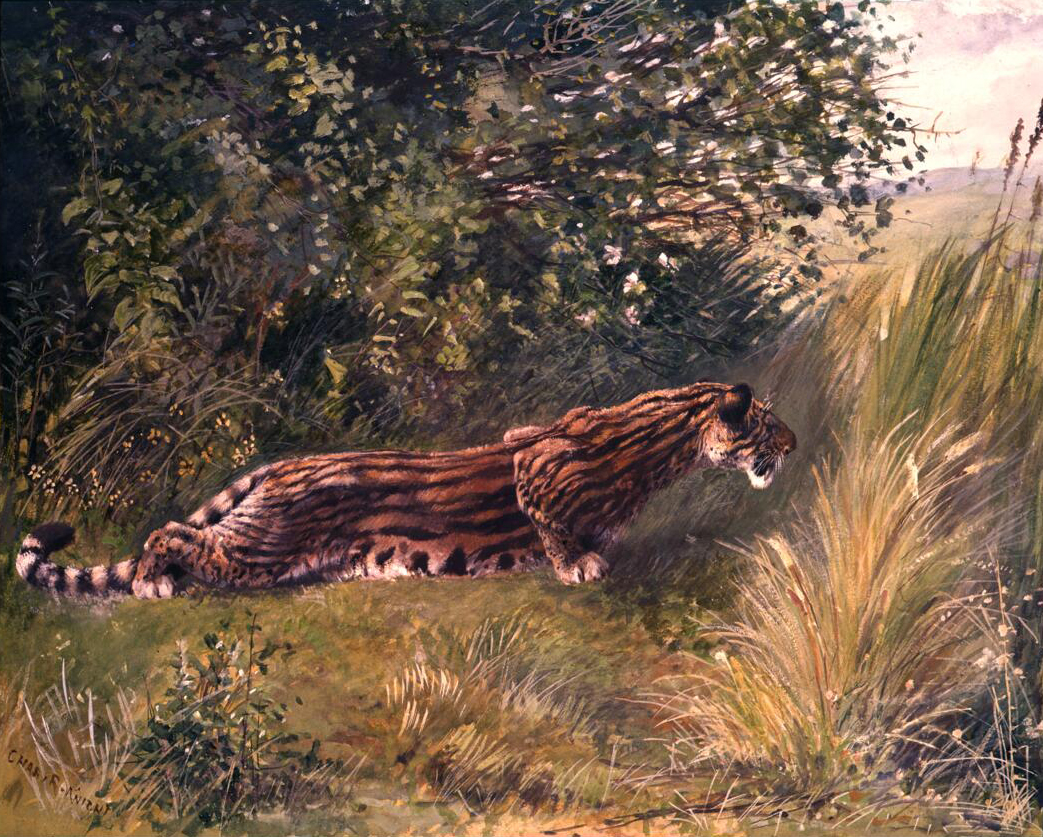
Life restoration by Charles R. Knight, 1897

H. occidentalis roamed North America from the late Eocene to early Oligocene from 33.4 to 31.4 mya, found in states such as Nebraska, North Dakota, South Dakota, and Wyoming. ^{Including supplementary materials} Within the Oreodon layer of the Brule Formation in South Dakota, it coexisted with predators such as fellow nimravid H. primaevus, the amphicyonid Daphoenus, entelodontidae Archaeotherium mortoni, hyaenodont Hyaenodon. Contemporary herbivores such the camel Poebrotherium wilsoni, the horse Mesohippus bairdi, tapirs such as Protapirus simplex and Colodon occidentalis, the hypertragulid Hypertragulus calcaratus and hornless rhinos such as the hyracodontid Hyracodon and Subhyracodon.

H. primaevus also roamed North America from the late Eocene to early Oligocene, from 35.7 to 30.58 mya, found in states such as Nebraska, South Dakota, Colorado, Wyoming, and Oregon. ^{Including supplementary materials} Within Chadron in Place, it coexisted with predators such as the nimravid Dinictis and canid Hesperocyon gregarius.

It was believed to have been the dominant cat-like predator, with its only serious competitor being the larger hyaenodonts like Hyaenodon.
