= Eofelis =

Eofelis Temporal range: Eocene–Miocene

Scientific classification
- Kingdom: Animalia
- Phylum: Chordata
- Class: Mammalia
- Order: Carnivora
- Family: †Nimravidae
- Genus: †Eofelis; Kretzoi, 1938

Type species
- †Eofelis edwardsii Kretzoi, 1938

Species
- E. edwardsii; E. giganteus

Extinct genus of carnivores

Eofelis is an extinct genus of small nimravid (false saber-toothed cats). They were catlike creatures that evolved in parallel with true cats but are not a part of the true cat lineage and have left no living descendants. The genus was first described in 1938 by Miklos Kretzoi.

Fossils have been found in the phosphorites of Quercy, France. It was recently determined that there were two distinct species of Eofelis from old collections, E. edwardsii being the most abundant.

E. giganteus was very large, almost twice the size of E. edwardsii.
