= Arikareean =

North American faunal stage

The Arikareean North American Stage on the geologic timescale is the North American faunal stage according to the North American Land Mammal Ages chronology (NALMA), set from 30 to 18.5 million years ago. It overlaps the Oligocene and Miocene epochs. The Arikareean is preceded by the Whitneyan and followed by the Hemingfordian NALMA stages.

The Arikareean can be further divided into the substages of:

- Ar4: late Late Arikareean: Lower boundary source, base of Geringian (approximate)
- Ar3: early Late Arikareean: base of Geringian (approximate). Upper boundary source: base of Hemingfordian (approximate).
- Ar2: late Early Arikareean: Lower boundary source of base of Geringian (approximate). Upper boundary source of base of Hemingfordian (approximate).
- Ar1: early Early Arikareean (shares lower boundary): Upper boundary source of base of Hemingfordian (approximate).
