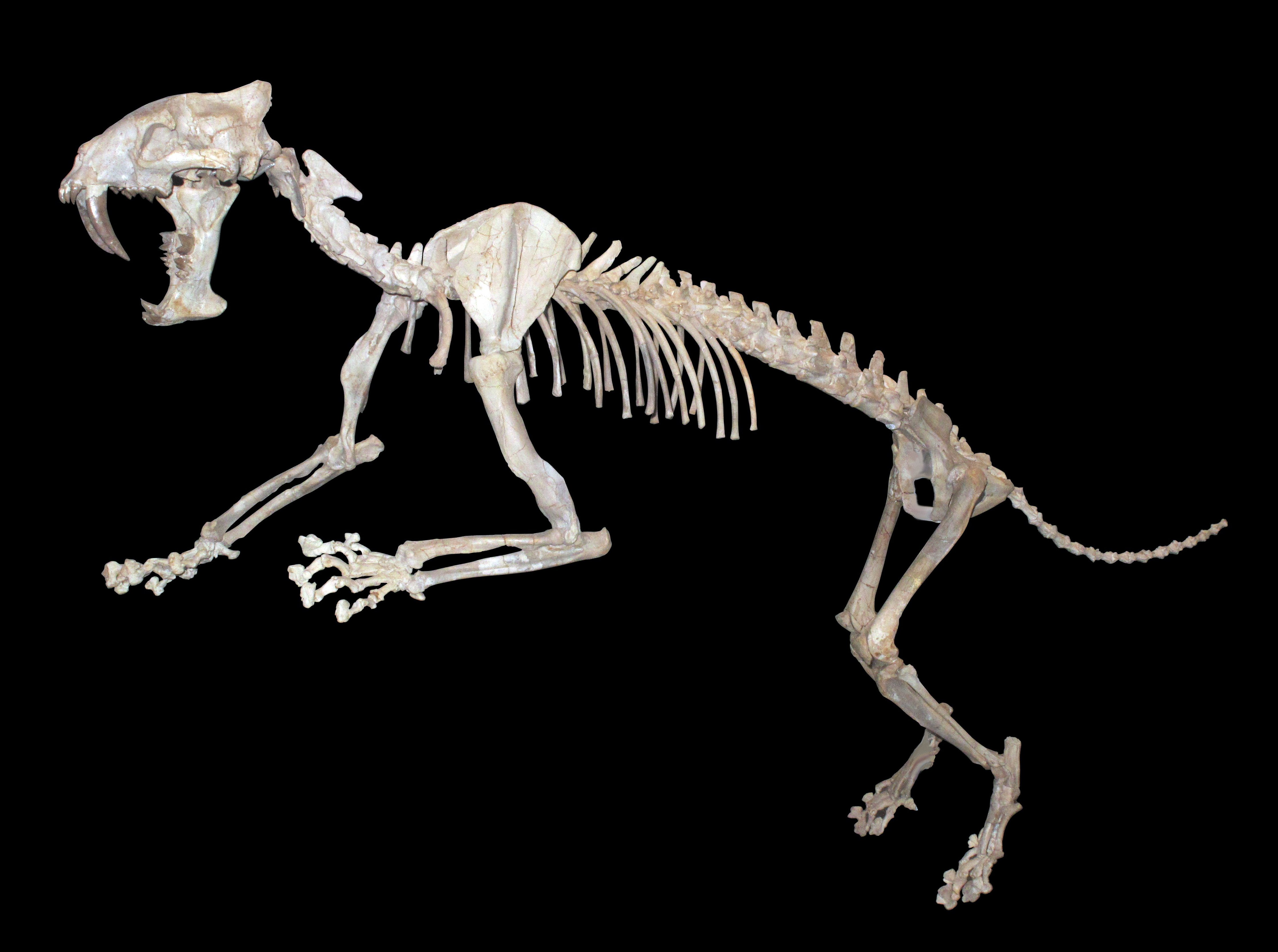
- Skeleton of Hoplophoneus primaevus

Scientific classification
- Kingdom: Animalia
- Phylum: Chordata
- Class: Mammalia
- Order: Carnivora
- Suborder: Feliformia
- Superfamily: †Nimravoidea
- Family: †Nimravidae; Cope, 1880

Genera
- †Maofelis; †Pangurban; †Hoplophoninae; †Hoplophoneus; †Eusmilus; †Nanosmilus; †Nimravinae (paraphyletic); †Barbourofelinae

Synonyms
- Barbourofelidae? Schultz, et al., 1970

= Nimravidae =

Nimravidae Temporal range: Middle Eocene–Late Miocene 41.03–7 Ma Possible Lutetian records

Extinct family of mammals in the order Carnivora

Nimravidae is an extinct family of carnivorans, sometimes known as false saber-toothed cats, whose fossils are found in North America, Africa, and Eurasia. Nimravids were the first lineage of carnivorans to evolve large body sizes and specialized into hunting large bodied prey. Not considered to belong to the true cats (family Felidae), the nimravids are generally considered closely related and classified as a distinct family in the suborder Feliformia.

The family consisted of three subfamilies hoplophonines, nimravines, and barbourofelines. Barboroufelines were initially classified as a subfamily of the Nimravidae since 1991, however in 2004, they were reassigned to their own distinct family. Since 2020, the majority of experts consider barbourofelines as nimravids again. Nimravids first appeared in the Middle Eocene in Asia, with Maofelis being the most plesiomorphic taxa. The family went extinct around 7 Ma.

== Taxonomy ==
The family Nimravidae was named by American paleontologist Edward Drinker Cope in 1880, with the type genus as Nimravus. The family was assigned to Fissipedia by Cope (1889); to Caniformia by Flynn and Galiano (1982); to Aeluroidea by Carroll (1988); to Feliformia by Bryant (1991); and to Carnivoramorpha, by Wesley-Hunt and Werdelin (2005).

Nimravids are placed in tribes by some authors to reflect closer relationships between genera within the family. Some nimravids evolved into large, toothed, cat-like forms with massive flattened upper canines and accompanying mandibular flanges. Some had dentition similar to felids, or modern cats, with smaller canines. Others had moderately increased canines in a more intermediate relationship between the saber-toothed cats and felids. The upper canines were not only shorter, but also more conical, than those of the true saber-toothed cats (Machairodontinae). These nimravids are referred to as "false saber-tooths". The barbourofelids were for a while no longer included in Nimravidae, following elevation to family as sister clade to the true cats (family Felidae). However, majority of recent studies have returned them to Nimravidae, with one study suggesting they are part of Nimravinae.

Not only did nimravids exhibit diverse dentition, but they also showed the same diversity in size and morphology as cats. Nimravids such as Barbourofelis morrisi, Eusmilus sicarius, and Hoplophoneus occidentalis were leopard-sized, while some, such as Albanosmilus jourdani and E. adelos, were the size jaguars to small lions. The largest nimravids, Quercylurus and Barbourofelis fricki, were able to reach even larger sizes, weighing 200 kg (440 lb) and 328 kg (723 lb) respectively. Dinaelurus had the short face, rounded skull, and smaller canines of the modern cheetah, and some such as E. bidentatus and Nanosmilus, were only the size of a small bobcat.

Family †Nimravidae
| Tribe | Image | Genus | Species |
|---|---|---|---|
| | | †Dinailurictis (Helbing, 1922) | †D. bonali |
| | | †Dinictis (Leidy, 1854) | †D. felina |
| | | †Eofelis (Kretzoi, 1938) | †E. edwardsii; †E. giganteus |
| | | †Saketoteron (Srivastava & Verma, 1970) | †S. tatroinse |
| | | †Maofelis (Averianov et al., 2016) | †M. cantonensis |
| | | †Pangurban (Poust et al, 2022) | †P. egiae |
| | | †Pogonodon (Cope, 1880) | †P. davisi; †P. platycopis |
| | | †Quercylurus (Ginsburg 1979) | †Q. major |
| †Nimravini | | †Dinaelurus (Eaton, 1922) | †D. crassus |
| †Nimravini | | †Nimravus (Cope, 1879) | †N. brachyops; †N. intermedius |
| †Hoplophoneini | | †Hoplophoneus (Cope, 1874) (Subgenus: †Eusmilus (Eaton, 1922)) | †H. bidentatus; †H. cerebralis; †H. dakotensis; †H. mentalis; †H. occidentalis; †H. oharrai; †H. primaevus; †H. sicarius; †H. villebramarensis |
| †Hoplophoneini | | †Nanosmilus (Martin, 1992) | †N. kurteni |

=== Phylogeny ===
The phylogenetic relationships of Nimravidae are shown in the following cladogram:

A 2021 study divides Nimravidae into Hoplophoninae and Nimravinae, the latter including the bulk of species in addition to barbourofelins.

Phylogeny of Nimravidae from the 2022 description of Pangurban:

- Nimravidae
  - Maofelis cantonensis
  - - MA-PHQ 348
    - - Nimravinae
        - - Dinictis felina
          - Pogonodon
            - Pogonodon davisi
            - Pogonodon platycopis
        - - - Dinaelurus crassus
            - Nimravus
              - Nimravus brachyops
              - Nimravus intermedius
          - - Eofelis edwardsii
            - - Dinailurictis bonali
              - Quercylurus major
      - Hoplophoneini
        - Pangurban egiae
        - - Hoplophoneus oharrai
          - - - Hoplophoneus occidentalis
              - Hoplophoneus primaevus
            - - Nanosmilus kurteni
              - Eusmilus
                - Eusmilus dakotensis
                - - Eusmilus sicarius
                  - - Eusmilus adelos
                    - - Eusmilus cerebralis
                      - - Eusmilus bidentatus
                        - Eusmilus villebramarensis

== Morphology ==
Most nimravids had muscular, low-slung, cat-like bodies, with shorter legs and tails than are typical of cats. Unlike extant Feliformia, the nimravids had a different bone structure in the small bones of the ear. The middle ear of true cats is housed in an external structure called an auditory bulla, which is separated by a septum into two chambers. Nimravid remains show ossified bullae with no septum, or no trace at all of the entire bulla. They are assumed to have had a cartilaginous housing of the ear mechanism. Nimravid feet were short, indicating they walked in a plantigrade or semiplantigrade posture, i.e., on the flat of the feet rather than the toes, like modern cats.

Although some nimravids physically resembled the saber-toothed cats, such as Smilodon, they were not closely related, but evolved a similar form through parallel evolution. They had synapomorphies with the barbourofelins in the cranium, mandible, dentition, and postcranium. They also had a downward-projecting flange on the front of the mandible as long as the canine teeth, a feature that also convergently evolved in the saber-toothed sparassodont Thylacosmilus. While most nimravids were thought to have been ambush predators, some such as Eusmilus adelos and Pogonodon davisi were recovered as pounce-pursuit predators. Albanosmilus whitfordi and Dinaelurus are thought to have been cursorial predators, although no post cranial remains have been found for Dinaelurus.

A 2021 study has shown that a sizeable number of species developed feline-like morphologies in addition to saber-toothed taxa.

== Evolution ==
Feliform evolutionary timeline

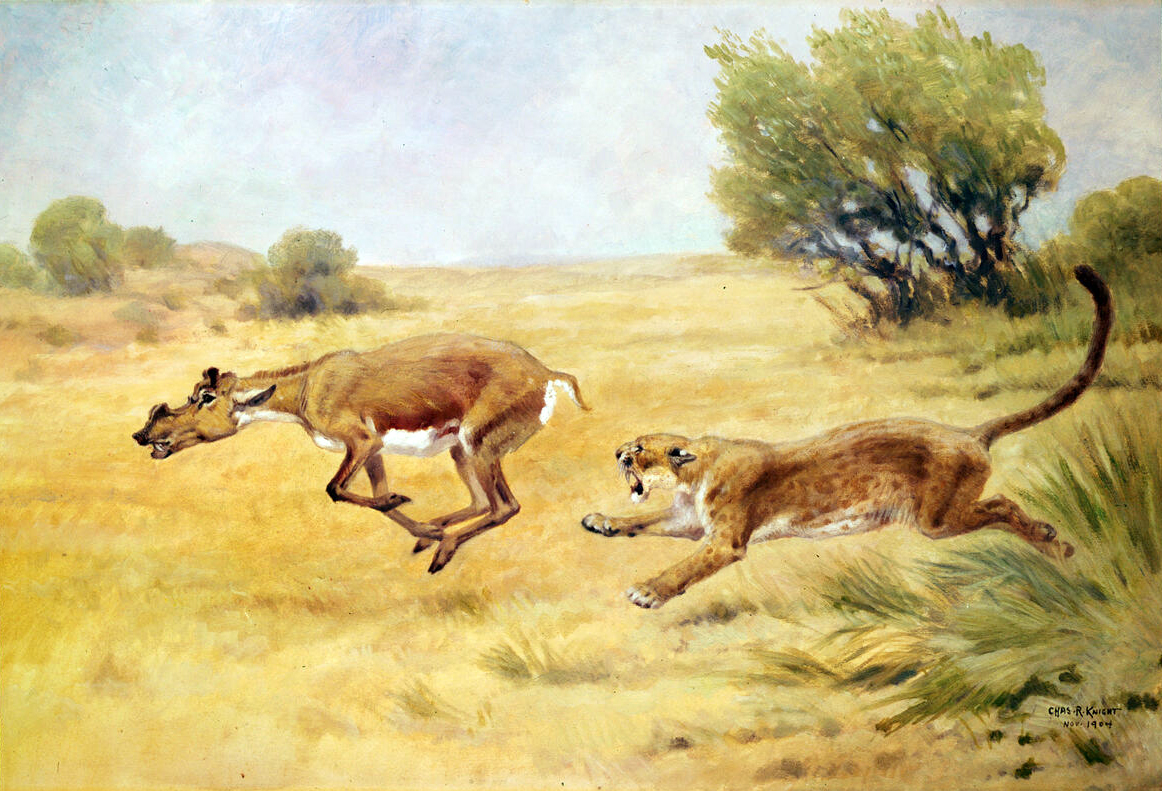
Restoration of Dinictis and Protoceras by Charles R. Knight

The ancestors of nimravids and cats diverged from a common ancestor soon after the Caniformia–Feliformia split, in the middle Eocene about 50 million years ago (Ma), with a minimum constraint of 43 Ma. Some of the first nimravids, Maofelis and Pangurban, appeared in the Middle Eocene epoch of Asia and North America respectively. Macrocarnivorous (specialization for hunting large prey) adaptations were already present in the earlist nimravids, making them one of the first carnivoran lineages to have specialization towards large bodied prey, as well as the first carnivoran lineage to evolve large body sizes.

The global climate at this time was warm and wet, but was trending cooler and drier toward the late Eocene. The lush forests of the Eocene were transforming to scrub and open woodland. This climatic trend continued in the Oligocene, and nimravids evidently flourished in this environment, with 13 contemporary species being present in the early Oligocene. Their diversification and increase in body size coincided with the decline and extinction of the oxyaenids, which opened the cat-like carnivore niche. Nimravids first appeared in Europe within MP21 following the Grande Coupure.

Barbourofelines probably evolved from nimravines dispersing into Africa during the Oligocene. The presence of large hyaenodonts prevented them from reaching a large size but were able to carve a niche due to their dental morphology. Eventually, they dispersed from Africa into Eurasia and later into North America. It was hypothesized that arrival of barbourofelines, along with felids, played a role in the decline and extinction of hesperocyonines. Barbourofelines experienced an increase in diversity during the Middle Miocene Climatic Optimum and the Late Miocene, roughly 10 Ma.

=== Extinction ===
Both hoplophonines and nimravines died out during the Oligocene epoch, with the last taxa going extinct 29.5 and 25.9 Ma respectively. In Europe, nimravids went extinct during the early Oligocene, coinciding with increased aridity in Europe. In North America, their extinction also coincided with the expansion of grasslands, in addition to competition with amphicyonids. The extinction of North American nimravids started the infamous cat gap, a 7 million year period when no cat-like predators were present in North America.

Barbourofelines went extinct during the late Miocene, around 7 Ma, for unknown reasons. Antón Mauricio suggested competition with machairodonts such as Machairodus and Nimravides, may have contributed to their extinction, as barbourofelines were widely successful despite the wider expansion of grasslands. However, Paul Barret has contested this hypothesis because of the limited temporal overlap between both clades. In addition, Albanosmilus, the last genus to go extinct in Eurasia, was also able to coexist and compete with machairodonts Amphimachairodus and Machairodus in some localities for over a million years. Other experts suggested it was more likely barbourofelines went extinct because of the faunal overturn during the Late Miocene due to the wider expansion of grasslands.
