= 2015 in paleomammalogy =

This paleomammalogy list records new fossil mammal taxa that were described during the year 2015, as well as notes other significant paleomammalogy discoveries and events which occurred during that year.

== General research ==
- Description of exceptionally preserved specimens of the pantodont species Alcidedorbignya inopinata and a study of its phylogenetic relationships is published by De Muizon et al. (2015).
- A study on the phylogenetic relationships of the family Nyctitheriidae based on new fossil remains of Plagioctenodon rosei and Plagioctenodon thewisseni is published by Manz et al. (2015).
- Studies of the phylogenetic relationships of litopterns and notoungulates within Placentalia, indicating that their closest living relatives are odd-toed ungulates, are published by Welker et al. (2015) and Buckley (2015).
- A study of the phylogenetic relationships of the Pleistocene camelid genus Camelops, based on genomic data extracted from its bones, is published by Heintzman et al. (2015).
- A study on the feeding habits of extant and fossil members of the family Canidae belonging to the tribe Canini, as indicated by skull size and shape, is published by Meloro, Hudson & Hook (2015).
- A study on the population dynamics of the cave lion (Panthera spelaea) during the Late Pleistocene is published by Ersmark et al. (2015).
- Description of tarsals attributed to Purgatorius and a study on the phylogenetic relationships of this mammal is published by Chester et al. (2015).
- A study on the age of the holotype specimen of Darwinius masillae at the time of death and on the life history of the species is published by López-Torres, Schillaci & Silcox (2015).
- Cranial endocast of Victoriapithecus macinessi is reconstructed by Gonzales et al. (2015).
- A study evaluating the evidence of association between extinctions or replacements of large mammals in the Northern Hemisphere in the Late Pleistocene with warming events is published by Cooper et al. (2015).
- A hominin Penghu 1, recovered sometime before 2008 by fishermen working in the Penghu Channel (between the Penghu Islands and mainland Taiwan) is described by Chang et al. (2015).

== Metatherians ==
Name	Novelty	Status	Authors	Age	Unit	Location	Notes	Images
Antawallathentes	Gen. et 2 sp. nov	Valid	Rincón et al.	Oligocene (Deseadan)	Salla Formation	Bolivia	A palaeothentid marsupial (a relative of the shrew opossums). Genus contains two species: Antawallathentes illimani and Antawallathentes quimsacruza.	
Archaeonothos	Gen. et sp. nov	Valid	Beck	Early Eocene	Murgon fossil site	Australia	A metatherian of uncertain phylogenetic placement. The type species is Archaeonothos henkgodthelpi.	
Ganguroo robustiter	Sp. nov	Valid	Cooke et al.	Miocene	Riversleigh World Heritage Area	Australia	A basal member of Macropodidae, a species of Ganguroo.	
Gaylordia mater	Sp. nov	Valid	De Oliveira & Goin	Itaboraian	Itaboraí Formation	Brazil	A metatherian of uncertain phylogenetic placement, possibly a relative of Pucadelphys; a species of Gaylordia.	
Lotheridium	Gen. et sp. nov	Valid	Bi et al.	Late Cretaceous	Qiupa Formation	China	A member of Deltatheridiidae. The type species is Lotheridium mengi.	
Lycopsis padillai	Sp. nov	Valid	Suarez et al.	Miocene	Castilletes Formation	Colombia	A member of Sparassodonta, a species of Lycopsis.	
Madju	Gen. et 2 sp. nov	Valid	Travouillon et al.	Late Oligocene to early late Miocene		Australia	A bandicoot. Genus contains two species: Madju variae and Madju encorensis.	
Nimbavombatus	Gen. et sp. nov	Valid	Brewer et al.	Early Miocene	Riversleigh World Heritage Area	Australia	A wombat. The type species is Nimbavombatus boodjamullensis.	
Oklatheridium wiblei	Sp. nov	Valid	Cifelli & Davis	Early Cretaceous (Albian)	Cloverly Formation	United States	A member of Deltatheroida, a species of Oklatheridium.	
Sedophascolomys	Gen. et comb. nov	Valid	Louys	Pliocene to Pleistocene		Australia	A wombat; a new genus for "Phascolomys" medius Owen (1872).	
Sparassocynus maimarai	Sp. nov	Valid	Abello et al.	Late Miocene	Maimará Formation	Argentina	A sparassocynid didelphoid (a relative of the opossums), a species of Sparassocynus.	
Thylacinus yorkellus	Sp. nov	Valid	Yates	Late Miocene or early Pliocene	Corra-Lynn Cave	Australia	A relative of the thylacine.	
Tsagandelta	Gen. et sp. nov	Valid	Rougier, Davis & Novacek	Late Cretaceous	Baynshiree Formation	Mongolia	A member of Deltatheroida. The type species is Tsagandelta dashzevegi.	
Wabularoo prideauxi	Sp. nov	Valid	Travouillon, Archer & Hand	Early Miocene	Riversleigh World Heritage Area	Australia	A member of Macropodoidea, a species of Wabularoo.	

== Eutherians ==
=== Xenarthrans ===
Name	Novelty	Status	Authors	Age	Unit	Location	Notes	Images
Eionaletherium	Gen. et sp. nov.	Valid	Rincón et al.	Late Miocene	Urumaco Formation	Venezuela	A mylodontoid sloth. The type species is Eionaletherium tanycnemius.	
Tonnicinctus	Gen. et sp. nov.	Valid	Góis et al.	Pleistocene (Ensenadan to Lujanian)		Argentina	A member of Pampatheriidae. The type species is Tonnicinctus mirus.	

=== Afrotherians ===
Name	Novelty	Status	Authors	Age	Unit	Location	Notes	Images
Arenagale	Gen. et sp. nov	Valid	Pickford	Eocene (Bartonian)	Eocliff Limestone	Namibia	A tenrec. The type species is A. calcareus.	
Callistosiren	Gen. et sp. nov.	Valid	Vélez-Juarbe & Domning	Late Oligocene	Lares Limestone	United States (Puerto Rico)	A dugong. The type species is Callistosiren boriquensis.	
Diamantochloris	Gen. et sp. nov	Valid	Pickford	Eocene (Lutetian)	Black Crow Limestone	Namibia	A golden mole. The type species is D. inconcessus.	
Namachloris	Gen. et sp. nov	Valid	Pickford	Eocene (Bartonian)	Eocliff Limestone	Namibia	A golden mole. The type species is N. arenatans.	
Namagale	Gen. et sp. nov	Valid	Pickford	Eocene (Bartonian)	Eocliff Limestone	Namibia	A member of Potamogalidae. The type species is N. grandis.	
Palaeoloxodon xylophagou	Sp. nov	Valid	Athanassiou et al.	Late middle Pleistocene		Cyprus	A member of Elephantidae, a species of Palaeoloxodon.	
Protanancus brevirostris	Sp. nov.	Valid	Wang et al.	Early Miocene	Linxia Basin	China	An amebelodont proboscidean. Originally described as a species of Protanancus, but subsequently transferred to the genus Saegusaia.	
Rupestrohyrax	Gen. et sp. nov	Valid	Pickford	Eocene (Bartonian)	Eoridge Limestone	Namibia	A hyrax related to Titanohyrax. The type species is R. palustris.	
Sperrgale	Gen. et sp. nov	Valid	Pickford	Eocene (Bartonian)	Eocliff Limestone	Namibia	A tenrec. The type species is S. minutus.	
Thyrohyrax libycus	Sp. nov	Valid	Coster et al.	Early Oligocene		Libya	A saghatheriid hyracoid, a species of Thyrohyrax.	

=== Bats ===
Name	Novelty	Status	Authors	Age	Unit	Location	Notes	Images
Cardioderma leakeyi	Sp. nov	Valid	Gunnell et al.	Early Pleistocene	Olduvai Gorge locality	Tanzania	A member of Megadermatidae related to the heart-nosed bat.	
Marnenycteris	Gen. et sp. nov	Valid	Hand et al.	Eocene (Ypresian)		France	A bat related to Onychonycteris. The type species is Marnenycteris michauxi.	
Mystacina miocenalis	Sp. nov.	Valid	Hand, Lee, Worthy & Archer in Hand et al.	Early Miocene (Altonian, 19–16 Ma)		New Zealand	A New Zealand short-tailed bat.	
Myzopoda africana	Sp. nov	Valid	Gunnell et al.	Early Pleistocene	Olduvai Gorge locality	Tanzania	A species of Myzopoda.	
Nycticeinops serengetiensis	Sp. nov	Valid	Gunnell et al.	Early Pleistocene	Olduvai Gorge locality	Tanzania	A vesper bat related to the Schlieffen's bat.	
Otonycteris rummeli	Sp. nov	Valid	Rosina	Late Miocene		Ukraine	A vesper bat related to the desert long-eared bat.	
Scotoecus olduvensis	Sp. nov	Valid	Gunnell et al.	Early Pleistocene	Olduvai Gorge locality	Tanzania	A vesper bat, a species of Scotoecus.	

=== Odd-toed ungulates ===
Name	Novelty	Status	Authors	Age	Unit	Location	Notes	Images
Boreohippidion	Gen. et comb. nov.	Valid	Avilla, Bernardes & Mothé	Early Pliocene (late Hemphillian)		United States	A member of Equidae; a new genus for "Onohippidium" galushai Macfadden & Skinner (1979).	
Cambaylophus	Gen. et sp. nov.	Valid	Kapur & Bajpai	Early Eocene	Cambay Shale	India	A member of Tapiroidea of uncertain phylogenetic placement. The type species is C. vastanensis.	
Chasmotherium depereti	Sp. nov	Valid	Remy	Eocene (Bartonian)		France	A relative of Hyrachyus, a species of Chasmotherium.	
Eolophiodon	Gen. et sp. nov.	Valid	Robinet et al.	Early Eocene		France	A relative of Lophiodon. The type species is Eolophiodon laboriense.	
Pachynolophus gaytei	Sp. nov	Valid	Remy	Eocene (Bartonian)		France	A member of Palaeotheriidae, a species of Pachynolophus.	
Persiatherium	Gen. et sp. et comb. nov	Valid	Pandolfi	Late Miocene		China; Iran	A rhinoceros related to Aceratherium. The type species is P. rodleri; genus also includes"Aceratherium" huadeensis Qiu (1979).	
Plesiohipparion shanxiense	Sp. nov.	Valid	Bernor, Sun & Chen	Early Pleistocene		China	A member of Equidae related to Hipparion; a species of Plesiohipparion.	
Vastanolophus	Gen. et sp. nov	Valid	Smith et al.	Eocene (Ypresian)	Cambay Shale Formation	India	A member of Tapiroidea, possibly a member of Helaletidae. The type species is Vastanolophus holbrooki.	

=== Even-toed ungulates ===
Name	Novelty	Status	Authors	Age	Unit	Location	Notes	Images
Anthracokeryx naduongensis	Sp. nov	Valid	Ducrocq et al.	Eocene	Na Duong Formation; Youganwo Formation	China; Vietnam	An anthracothere, a species of Anthracokeryx.	
Bothriogenys langsonensis	Sp. nov	Valid	Ducrocq et al.	Eocene	Na Duong Formation	Vietnam	An anthracothere, a species of Bothriogenys.	
Bothriogenys vietnamensis	Sp. nov	Valid	Ducrocq et al.	Eocene	Na Duong Formation	Vietnam	An anthracothere, a species of Bothriogenys.	
Eotragus lampangensis	Sp. nov	Valid	Suraprasit et al.	Late Middle Miocene (13.4-13.2 Ma)	Nakhaem Formation	Thailand	A bovid, a species of Eotragus.	
Epirigenys	Gen. et sp. nov	Valid	Lihoreau et al.	Oligocene	Lokone Sandstone Formation	Kenya	A relative of hippopotamuses. The type species is Epirigenys lokonensis.	
Eucladoceros montenegrensis	Sp. nov	Valid	Van der Made & Dimitrijević	Early Pleistocene		Montenegro	A deer, a species of Eucladoceros.	
Euprox grandis	Sp. nov	Valid	Hou	Late Miocene	Liushu Formation	China	A member of Cervidae related to muntjacs, a species of Euprox.	
Kachchhchoerus	Gen. et comb. nov	Valid	Bhandari, Pickford & Tiwari	Late Miocene		India	A member of Suidae. Genus includes K. salinus (Pilgrim, 1926).	
Kolpochoerus phillipi	Sp. nov	Valid	Souron, Boisserie & White	Late Pliocene or early Pleistocene (ca. 2.5 Ma)	Middle Awash	Ethiopia	A suid, a species of Kolpochoerus.	
Lucashyus	Gen. et sp. nov	Valid	Prothero	Late early Arikareean		United States	A peccary. The type species is Lucashyus coombsae.	
Marshochoerus	Gen. et comb. nov	Valid	Prothero	Late Arikareean to late Hemingfordian		United States	A peccary; a new genus for "Thinohyus" socialis Marsh (1875).	
Muntiacus ? huangi	Sp. nov	Valid	Dong & Chen	Pleistocene		China	A member of Cervidae, possibly a muntjac.	
Nguruwe ? galaticum	Sp. nov	Valid	Orliac et al.	Late early Miocene	Kumartaş Formation	Turkey	A hyotheriine suid, possibly a species of Nguruwe.	
Paratoceras coatesi	Sp. nov	Valid	Rincon et al.	Miocene (early Hemingfordian)	Cucaracha Formation	Panama	A member of Protoceratidae, a species of Paratoceras.	
Paratoceras orarius	Sp. nov	Valid	Rincon et al.	Early Miocene	Culebra Formation	Panama	A member of Protoceratidae, a species of Paratoceras.	
Sivacobus sankaliai	Sp. nov	Valid	Vrba, Bibi & Costa	Late Pleistocene		India	A member of Bovidae belonging to the subfamily Reduncinae, a species of Sivacobus.	
Stuckyhyus	Gen. et comb. nov	Valid	Prothero	Late Arikareean		United States	A peccary; a new genus for "Thinohyus" siouxensis Peterson (1905).	
Wrightohyus	Gen. et sp. nov	Valid	Prothero	Late Arikareean to early Hemingfordian		United States	A peccary. The type species is Wrightohyus yatkolai.	
Xenokeryx	Gen. et sp. nov	Valid	Sánchez et al.	Miocene (middle Aragonian)		Spain	A member of Palaeomerycidae. The type species is Xenokeryx amidalae.	

=== Cetaceans ===
Name	Novelty	Status	Authors	Age	Unit	Location	Notes	Images
Albicetus	Gen. et comb. nov	Valid	Boersma & Pyenson	Miocene (Langhian)	Monterey Formation	United States	A basal member of Physeteroidea. The type species is "Ontocetus" oxymycterus Kellogg (1925).	
Ashleycetus	Gen. et sp. nov	Valid	Sanders & Geisler	Oligocene (late Rupelian)	Ashley Formation	United States	A basal odontocete. The type species is Ashleycetus planicapitis.	
Brabocetus	Gen. et sp. nov	Valid	Colpaert, Bosselaers & Lambert	Pliocene (Zanclean)	Kattendijk Formation	Belgium	A porpoise. The type species is Brabocetus gigasei.	
Chilcacetus	Gen. et sp. nov	Valid	Lambert, De Muizon & Bianucci	Early Miocene	Chilcatay Formation	Peru	A toothed whale of uncertain phylogenetic placement, possibly related to Argyrocetus and Macrodelphinus. The type species is Chilcacetus cavirhinus.	
Chrysocetus fouadassii	Sp. nov	Valid	Gingerich & Zouhri	Eocene (Bartonian)	Aridal Formation	Western Sahara	A basilosaurid, a species of Chrysocetus.	
Fucaia	Gen. et sp. et comb. nov	Valid	Marx, Tsai & Fordyce	Oligocene	Makah Formation; Pysht Formation	United States	A member of Aetiocetidae. The type species is Fucaia buelli; genus also includes "Chonecetus" goedertorum Barnes & Furusawa in Barnes et al. (1994).	
Horopeta	Gen. et sp. nov	Valid	Tsai & Fordyce	Oligocene (early Chattian)	Kokoamu Greensand	New Zealand	An early baleen whale. The type species is Horopeta umarere.	
Isthminia	Gen. et sp. nov	Valid	Pyenson et al.	Miocene (Messinian)	Chagres Formation	Panama	An inioid river dolphin. The type species is Isthminia panamensis.	
Nanokogia	Gen. et sp. nov	Valid	Velez-Juarbe et al.	Late Miocene	Chagres Formation	Panama	A member of Kogiidae. The type species is Nanokogia isthmia.	
Otekaikea huata	Sp. nov	Valid	Tanaka & Fordyce	Oligo/Miocene boundary (Waitakian)	Otekaike Limestone	New Zealand	A relative of the South Asian river dolphin, a species of Otekaikea.	
Platyosphys aithai	Sp. nov	Valid	Gingerich & Zouhri	Eocene (Bartonian)	Aridal Formation	Western Sahara	A basilosaurid. Originally described as a species of Platyosphys, but subsequently made the type species of the separate genus Antaecetus.	
Tokarahia	Gen. et sp. et comb. nov	Valid	Boessenecker & Fordyce	Late Oligocene	Kokoamu Greensand; Otekaike Limestone	New Zealand	An eomysticetid baleen whale. The type species is Tokarahia kauaeroa; genus also contains "Mauicetus" lophocephalus Marples (1956).	
Tranatocetus	Gen. et comb. nov	Valid	Gol'din & Steeman	Miocene (Tortonian)	Gram Formation	Denmark	A baleen whale, of uncertain phylogenetic placement, possibly a relative of rorquals and gray whales or a member of the family Cetotheriidae; a new genus for "Mesocetus" argillarius Roth (1978).	Holotype of Tranatocetus argillarius
Waharoa	Gen. et sp. nov	Valid	Boessenecker & Fordyce	Late Oligocene	Otekaike Limestone	New Zealand	An eomysticetid baleen whale. The type species is Waharoa ruwhenua.	

=== Carnivorans ===
Name	Novelty	Status	Authors	Age	Unit	Location	Notes	Images
Archaeodobenus	Gen. et sp. nov	Valid	Tanaka & Kohno	Late Miocene	Ichibangawa Formation	Japan	A member of Odobenidae (a relative of the walrus). The type species is Archaeodobenus akamatsui.	
Australophoca	Gen. et sp. nov	Valid	Valenzuela-Toro et al.	Late Miocene	Bahía Inglesa Formation; Pisco Formation	Chile; Peru	An earless seal belonging to the subfamily Monachinae. The type species is Australophoca changorum.	
Cynelos malasi	Sp. nov	Valid	Hunt & Stepleton	Early Miocene		United States	An amphicyonid, a species of Cynelos.	
Cynotherium malatestai	Sp. nov	Valid	Madurell-Malapeira, Palombo & Sotnikova	Early middle Pleistocene		Italy	A relative of the Sardinian dhole.	
Devinophoca emryi	Sp. nov	Valid	Koretsky & Rahmat	Early Middle Miocene (early Badenian)		Slovakia	A devinophocine earless seal, a species of Devinophoca.	
Eotaria	Gen. et sp. nov	Valid	Boessenecker & Churchill	Miocene (Burdigalian–Langhian)		United States	A fur seal. The type species is Eotaria crypta.	
Lutra hearsti	Sp. nov	Valid	Geraads et al.	Pliocene	Hadar Formation	Ethiopia	An otter, a species of Lutra.	
Praepusa boeska	Sp. nov	Valid	Koretsky, Peters & Rahmat	Late Miocene—Pliocene		Belgium; Netherlands	An earless seal, a species of Praepusa.	
Vulpes mathisoni	Sp. nov	Valid	Geraads et al.	Pliocene	Mursi Formation	Ethiopia	A fox, a species of Vulpes.	
Yoshi	Gen. et sp. et comb. nov	Valid	Spassov & Geraads	Late Miocene		Greece; Macedonia	A felid. The type species is Yoshi garevskii; genus also contains "Metailurus" parvulus (Hensel, 1862) (nomen dubium) and "Metailurus" minor Zdansky, 1924.	

=== Rodents ===
Name	Novelty	Status	Authors	Age	Unit	Location	Notes	Images
Acarechimys leucotheae	Sp. nov	Valid	Vucetich et al.	Late Oligocene	Sarmiento Formation	Argentina	An octodontoid caviomorph of uncertain phylogenetic placement. Originally described as a species of Acarechimys; subsequently removed from the genus and transferred to the family Octodontidae by Verzi, Olivares and Morgan (2017).	
Allotypomys	Gen. et sp. nov	Valid	Korth & Samuels	Arikareean	John Day Formation	United States	A member of Eutypomyidae. The type species is Allotypomys pictus.	
Apeomys whistleri	Sp. nov	Valid	Korth & Samuels	Arikareean	John Day Formation	United States	A member of Eomyidae, a species of Apeomys.	
Bursagnathus	Gen. et sp. nov	Valid	Korth & Samuels	Arikareean	John Day Formation	United States	A member of Heteromyidae. The type species is Bursagnathus aterosseus.	
Cedromus woodi	Sp. nov	Valid	Korth	Oligocene (Whitneyan)	Brule Formation	United States	A member of the family Sciuridae.	
Cephalomys ceciae	Sp. nov	Valid	Vucetich et al.	Late Oligocene	Sarmiento Formation	Argentina	A cephalomyid, a species of Cephalomys.	
Chenomys	Gen. et sp. nov	Valid	Li & Meng	Earliest Eocene	Nomogen Formation	China	A ctenodactyloid rodent. The type species is Chenomys orientalis.	
Doryperimys	Gen. et sp. nov	Valid	Kramarz, Bond & Arnal	Early Miocene	Cerro Bandera Formation	Argentina	A member of Neoepiblemidae. The type species is Doryperimys olsacheri.	
Eliomys yevesi	Sp. nov	Valid	Mansino et al.	Late Miocene (late Turolian)	Villatoya-Venta del Moro Formation	Spain	A dormouse, a species of Eliomys.	
Ethelomys	Gen. et comb. nov	Valid	Vucetich et al.	Late Oligocene	Sarmiento Formation	Argentina	An octodontoid caviomorph of uncertain phylogenetic placement; a new genus for "Deseadomys" loomisi Wood & Patterson (1959).	
Eumysops marplatensis	Sp. nov	Valid	Olivares & Verzi	Late Pliocene to early Pleistocene	San Andrés Formation; Vorohué Formation	Argentina	A member of Echimyidae, a species of Eumysops.	
Galileomys baios	Sp. nov	Valid	Vucetich et al.	Late Oligocene	Sarmiento Formation	Argentina	An acaremyid octodontoid caviomorph, a species of Galileomys.	
Heterotamias	Gen. et comb. nov	Valid	Qiu	Early Miocene	Xiacaowan Formation	China	A chipmunk; a new genus for "Eutamias" sihongensis Qiu & Lin (1986).	
Incamys menniorum	Sp. nov	Valid	Vucetich et al.	Late Oligocene	Sarmiento Formation	Argentina	A chinchilloid caviomorph of uncertain phylogenetic placement, a species of Incamys.	
Kabirmys prius	Sp. nov	Valid	Coster et al.	Eocene		Libya	A nementchamyid anomaluromorph, a species of Kabirmys.	
Lamugaulus	Gen. et sp. nov	Valid	Tesakov & Lopatin	Early Miocene	Khalagay Formation	Russia	A promylagauline mylagaulid. The type species is Lamugaulus olkhonensis.	
Leggadina gregoriensis	Sp. nov	Valid	Klinkhamer & Godthelp	Early Pleistocene	Riversleigh World Heritage Area	Australia	A murine murid, a species of Leggadina.	
Leggadina macrodonta	Sp. nov	Valid	Klinkhamer & Godthelp	Pliocene or Pleistocene		Australia	A murine murid, a species of Leggadina.	
Leucokephalos	Gen. et 2 sp. nov	Valid	Vucetich et al.	Late Oligocene to early Miocene	Cerro Bandera Formation; Sarmiento Formation	Argentina	A caviomorph of uncertain phylogenetic placement. The type species is Leucokephalos zeffiae Vucetich et al. (2015); genus also contains Leucokephalos maior Kramarz, Bond & Arnal (2015).	
Llitun	Gen. et sp. nov	Valid	Vucetich et al.	Late Oligocene	Sarmiento Formation	Argentina	A caviomorph of uncertain phylogenetic placement. The type species is Llitun notuca.	
Loncolicu	Gen. et sp. nov	Valid	Vucetich et al.	Late Oligocene	Sarmiento Formation	Argentina	A chinchilloid caviomorph of uncertain phylogenetic placement. The type species is Loncolicu tretos.	
Metaphiomys zallahensis	Sp. nov	Valid	Coster et al.	Early Oligocene		Libya	A hystricognathous rodent, a species of Metaphiomys.	
Microtheriomys	Gen. et sp. nov	Valid	Korth & Samuels	Arikareean	John Day Formation	United States	An anchitheriomyine castorid. The type species is Microtheriomys brevirhinus.	
Miosciurus covensis	Sp. nov	Valid	Korth & Samuels	Arikareean	John Day Formation	United States	A sciurine sciurid, a species of Miosciurus.	
Mus denizliensis	Sp. nov	Valid	Erten, Sen & Sagular	Early Pleistocene	Denizli Basin	Turkey	A mouse.	
Neoadjidaumo arctozophus	Sp. nov	Valid	Korth & Samuels	Arikareean	John Day Formation	United States	A member of Eomyidae, a species of Neoadjidaumo.	
Neophiomys dawsonae	Sp. nov	Valid	Coster et al.	Early Oligocene		Libya	A relative of the cane rats, a species of Neophiomys.	
Omboomys	Gen. et sp. nov	Valid	Maridet et al.	Late Miocene		Mongolia	An eomyid rodent. The type species is Omboomys builstynensis.	
Palaeosciurus jiangi	Sp. nov	Valid	Qiu	Early Miocene	Xiacaowan Formation	China	A ground squirrel, a species of Palaeosciurus.	
Plesiosminthus fremdi	Sp. nov	Valid	Korth & Samuels	Arikareean	John Day Formation	United States	A dipodid related to the birch mice, a species of Plesiosminthus.	
Proafricanomys	Gen. et sp. nov	Valid	López-Antoñanzas et al.	Miocene (Tortonian)		Lebanon	A gundi. The type species is Proafricanomys libanensis.	
Proapeomys	Gen. et sp. nov	Valid	Korth & Samuels	Arikareean	John Day Formation	United States	A member of Eomyidae. The type species is Proapeomys condoni; genus might also contain the species "Florentiamys" lulli Wood (1936).	
Proheteromys latidens	Sp. nov	Valid	Korth & Samuels	Arikareean	John Day Formation	United States	A member of Heteromyidae, a species of Proheteromys.	
Promimomys enginae	Sp. nov	Valid	Suata-Alpaslan	Early Pliocene		Turkey	A member of Arvicolidae, a species of Promimomys.	
Protacaremys? adilos	Sp. nov	Valid	Vucetich et al.	Late Oligocene	Sarmiento Formation	Argentina	An octodontoid caviomorph of uncertain phylogenetic placement, possibly a species of Protacaremys.	
Prozenkerella	Gen. et sp. nov	Valid	Coster et al.	Early Oligocene		Libya	An anomalure. The type species is Prozenkerella saharaensis.	
Pseudoacaremys	Gen. et sp. nov	Valid	Arnal & Vucetich	Miocene (Santacrucian)	Santa Cruz Formation	Argentina	An acaremyid octodontoid caviomorph rodent. The type species is Pseudoacaremys kramarzi.	
Simplicimys	Gen. et sp. nov	Valid	Li & Meng	Early-middle Eocene	Arshanto Formation; Irdin Manha Formation	China	A ctenodactyloid rodent. The type species is Simplicimys bellus.	
Subathumys	Gen. et 2 sp. nov	Valid	Gupta & Kumar	Early Eocene (Ypresian)	Subathu Formation	India	A relative of gundis. The type species is Subathumys solanorius; genus also contains Subathumys globulus.	
Tachyoryctoides bayarmae	Sp. nov	Valid	Daxner-Höck, Badamgarav & Maridet	Late Oligocene		Mongolia	A subterranean rodent belonging to the subfamily Tachyorytoidinae, a species of Tachyoryctoides.	
Tachyoryctoides radnai	Sp. nov	Valid	Daxner-Höck, Badamgarav & Maridet	Late Oligocene		Mongolia	A subterranean rodent belonging to the subfamily Tachyorytoidinae, a species of Tachyoryctoides.	
Tamquammys fractus	Sp. nov	Valid	Li & Meng	Middle Eocene	Irdin Manha Formation	China	A ctenodactyloid rodent, a species of Tamquammys.	
Tamquammys longus	Sp. nov	Valid	Li & Meng	Early Eocene	Arshanto Formation	China	A ctenodactyloid rodent, a species of Tamquammys.	
Tamquammys robustus	Sp. nov	Valid	Li & Meng	Early Eocene	Arshanto Formation; Nomogen Formation	China	A ctenodactyloid rodent, a species of Tamquammys.	
Trogomys oregonensis	Sp. nov	Valid	Korth & Samuels	Arikareean	John Day Formation	United States	A member of Heteromyidae, a species of Trogomys.	
Yongshengomys	Gen. et sp. nov	Valid	Li & Meng	Middle Eocene	Irdin Manha Formation	China	A ctenodactyloid rodent. The type species is Yongshengomys extensus.	
Yuomys huheboerhensis	Sp. nov	Valid	Li & Meng	Middle Eocene	Irdin Manha Formation	China	A ctenodactyloid rodent, a species of Yuomys.	

=== Primates ===
Name	Novelty	Status	Authors	Age	Unit	Location	Notes	Images
Australopithecus deyiremeda	Sp. nov	Valid	Haile-Selassie et al.	Pliocene		Ethiopia	A species of Australopithecus.	
Ekembo	Gen. et comb. nov	Valid	McNulty et al.	Early Miocene	Hiwegi Formation	Kenya	An ape of uncertain phylogenetic placement. A new genus for "Proconsul" nyanzae Le Gros Clark & Leakey (1950); genus also contains "Proconsul" heseloni Walker et al. (1993).	
Ekgmowechashala zancanellai	Sp. nov	Valid	Samuels, Albright & Fremd	Arikareean	John Day Formation	United States	A primate of uncertain phylogenetic placement, probably an adapiform; a species of Ekgmowechashala.	
Homo naledi	Sp. nov	Valid	Berger et al.	Mid- to late-Middle Pleistocene	Rising Star Cave	South Africa	A species of Homo.	
Myanmarcolobus	Gen. et sp. nov	Valid	Takai et al.	Late Miocene to early Pliocene		Myanmar	A member of Colobinae. The type species is Myanmarcolobus yawensis.	
Namaloris	Gen. et sp. nov	Valid	Pickford	Eocene (Bartonian)	Eocliff Limestone	Namibia	A member of Lorisidae. The type species is N. rupestris.	
Necrolemur anadoni	Sp. nov	Valid	Minwer-Barakat, Marigó & Moyà-Solà	Middle Eocene (Robiacian)		Spain	A member of Omomyidae belonging to the subfamily Microchoerinae; a species of Necrolemur.	
Perupithecus	Gen. et sp. nov	Valid	Bond et al.	Probably late Eocene	Yahuarango Formation	Peru	A member of Anthropoidea of uncertain phylogenetic placement, probably a member of Platyrrhini. The type species is Perupithecus ucayaliensis.	
Pliobates	Gen. et sp. nov	Valid	Alba et al.	Miocene		Spain	Originally described as an ape; Bouchet et al. (2024) subsequently reinterpreted it as a member of Pliopithecoidea belonging to the family Crouzeliidae. The type species is Pliobates cataloniae.	

=== Other eutherians ===
Name	Novelty	Status	Authors	Age	Unit	Location	Notes	Images
Altacreodus	Gen. et comb. nov	Valid	Fox	Late Cretaceous		Canada; United States	A basal member of Eutheria; a new genus for "Cimolestes" magnus Clemens & Russell (1965).	
Ambilestes	Gen. et comb. nov	Valid	Fox	Late Cretaceous		Canada	A basal member of Eutheria; a new genus for "Cimolestes" cerberoides Lillegraven (1969).	
Carodnia inexpectans	Sp. nov	Valid	Antoine et al.	Early Eocene	Mogollón Formation	Peru	A member of Xenungulata, a species of Carodnia.	
Chilestylops	Gen. et sp. nov	Valid	Bradham et al.	Tinguirirican	Abanico Formation	Chile	A notostylopid notoungulate. The type species is Chilestylops davidsoni.	
Galerix wesselsae	Sp. nov	Valid	Zijlstra & Flynn	Miocene		Pakistan	A member of Erinaceidae (a relative of gymnures and hedgehogs); a species of Galerix.	
Hilarcotherium	Gen. et sp. nov	Valid	Vallejo-Pareja et al.	Miocene	La Victoria Formation	Colombia	An astrapotheriid astrapothere. The type species is Hilarcotherium castanedaii.	
Kerberos	Gen. et sp. nov	Valid	Solé et al.	Eocene (Bartonian)	Formation des Molasses de Saix et de Lautrec	France	A hyainailourine hyaenodont. The type species is Kerberos langebadreae.	
Lacrimodon	Gen. et sp. nov	Valid	Van den Hoek Ostende and Fejfar	Early Miocene		Czech Republic	A member of Eulipotyphla related to Dimylus. The type species is Lacrimodon vandermeuleni.	
Mimolagus aurorae	Sp. nov	Valid	Fostowicz-Frelik et al.	Early Middle Eocene	Irdin Manha Formation	China	A member of Glires belonging to the family Mimotonidae, a species of Mimolagus.	
Nesodon taweretus	Sp. nov	Valid	Forasiepi et al.	Early Miocene	Aisol Formation	Argentina	A toxodontid, a species of Nesodon.	
Paedotherium kakai	Sp. nov	Valid	Reguero et al.	Miocene (Huayquerian)	Palo Pintado Formation	Argentina	A hegetotheriid notoungulate, a species of Paedotherium.	
Pampahippus secundus	Sp. nov	Valid	Deraco & García-López	Eocene	Lumbrera Formation	Argentina	A member of Toxodontia, a species of Pampahippus.	
Periphragnis vicentei	Sp. nov	Valid	Bradham et al.	Tinguirirican	Abanico Formation	Chile	A member of Toxodontia belonging or related to the family Homalodotheriidae; a species of Periphragnis.	
Plagioctenodon thewisseni	Sp. nov	Valid	Manz & Bloch	Paleocene (Clarkforkian)	Willwood Formation	United States	A member of Nyctitheriidae, a species of Plagioctenodon.	
Preregidens	Gen. et sp. nov	Valid	Solé, Falconnet & Vidalenc	Eocene		France	A member of Hyaenodonta. The type species is Preregidens langebadrae.	
Prohegetotherium malalhuense	Sp. nov	Valid	Cerdeño & Reguero	Oligocene (Deseadan)		Argentina	A hegetotheriid notoungulate, a species of Prohegetotherium.	
Prolagus latiuncinatus	Sp. nov	Valid	Angelone & Čermák	Late Miocene		Hungary	A member of Lagomorpha, a species of Prolagus.	
Prolagus pannonicus	Sp. nov	Valid	Angelone & Čermák	Late Miocene		Hungary	A member of Lagomorpha, a species of Prolagus.	
Protypotherium sinclairi	Sp. nov	Valid	Kramarz, Bond & Arnal	Early Miocene	Cerro Bandera Formation	Argentina	An interatheriid notoungulate, a species of Protypotherium.	
Ricardocifellia	Nom. nov	Valid	Mones	Paleogene (Itaboraian)		Brazil	A didolodontid "condylarth"; a replacement name for Paulacoutoia Cifelli, 1983 and Depaulacoutoia Cifelli & Ortiz-Jaureguizar, 2014 (both preoccupied).	
Scollardius	Gen. et comb. nov	Valid	Fox	Late Cretaceous		Canada; United States	A basal member of Eutheria; a new genus for "Cimolestes" propalaeoryctes Lillegraven (1969).	
Seuku	Gen. et comb. nov	Valid	Beatty & Cockburn	Oligocene		United States	A desmostylian; a new genus for "Behemotops" emlongi Domning, Ray & McKenna (1986).	
Sigynorum	Gen. et sp. nov	Valid	McComas & Eberle	Paleocene (early Puercan)	Fort Union Formation	United States	A member of Arctocyonidae. The type species is Sigynorum magnadivisus.	
Sinclairella simplicidens	Sp. nov	Valid	Czaplewski & Morgan	Late Oligocene (Arikareean)	Crystal River Formation	United States	A member of Apatemyidae, a species of Sinclairella.	

== Other mammals ==
Name	Novelty	Status	Authors	Age	Unit	Location	Notes	Images
Agilodocodon	Gen. et sp. nov	Valid	Meng et al.	Middle Jurassic	"Daohugou site in Tiaojishan Formation (...), also known as Jiulongshan Formation"	China	A docodont. The type species is Agilodocodon scansorius.	
Argaliatherium	Gen. et sp. nov	Valid	Cifelli & Davis	Early Cretaceous (Albian)	Cloverly Formation	United States	A basal member of Tribosphenida. The type species is Argaliatherium robustum.	
Carinalestes	Gen. et sp. nov	Valid	Cifelli & Davis	Early Cretaceous (Albian)	Cloverly Formation	United States	A basal member of Tribosphenida. The type species is Carinalestes murensis.	
Docodon apoxys	Sp. nov	Valid	Rougier et al.	Late Jurassic	Morrison Formation	United States	A docodont, a species of Docodon.	
Docofossor	Gen. et sp. nov	Valid	Luo et al.	Late Jurassic	Tiaojishan Formation	China	A docodont. The type species is Docofossor brachydactylus.	
Gobiconodon haizhouensis	Sp. nov	Valid	Kusuhashi et al.	Early Cretaceous	Fuxin Formation	China	A gobiconodontid, a species of Gobiconodon.	
Gobiconodon tomidai	Sp. nov	Valid	Kusuhashi et al.	Early Cretaceous	Shahai Formation	China	A gobiconodontid, a species of Gobiconodon.	
Kimbetopsalis	Gen. et sp. nov	Valid	Williamson et al.	Early Paleocene (Puercan)	Nacimiento Formation	United States	A taeniolabidid multituberculate. The type species is Kimbetopsalis simmonsae.	
Spinolestes	Gen. et sp. nov	Valid	Martin et al.	Early Cretaceous (latest Barremian)	Calizas de La Huergina Formation	Spain	A gobiconodontid. The type species is Spinolestes xenarthrosus.	
Tirotherium	Gen. et sp. nov	Valid	Montellano-Ballesteros & Fox	Late Cretaceous (late Santonian to early Campanian)	Milk River Formation	Canada	An early member of Boreosphenida, probably a member of Picopsidae. The type species is Tirotherium aptum.	
Valenopsalis	Gen. et comb. nov	Valid	Williamson et al.	Early Paleocene (Puercan)	Bug Creek Anthills and Bug Creek West	United States	A taeniolabidoid multituberculate; a new genus for "Catopsalis" joyneri Sloan & Van Valen (1965).	
Yubaatar	Gen. et sp. nov	Valid	Xu et al.	Late Cretaceous	Qiupa Formation	China	A cimolodont multituberculate. The type species is Yubaatar zhongyuanensis.	
