= John Day Formation =

Geological formation in Oregon, United States

- Stratigraphic range: Eocene-Early Miocene; ~39–18 Ma
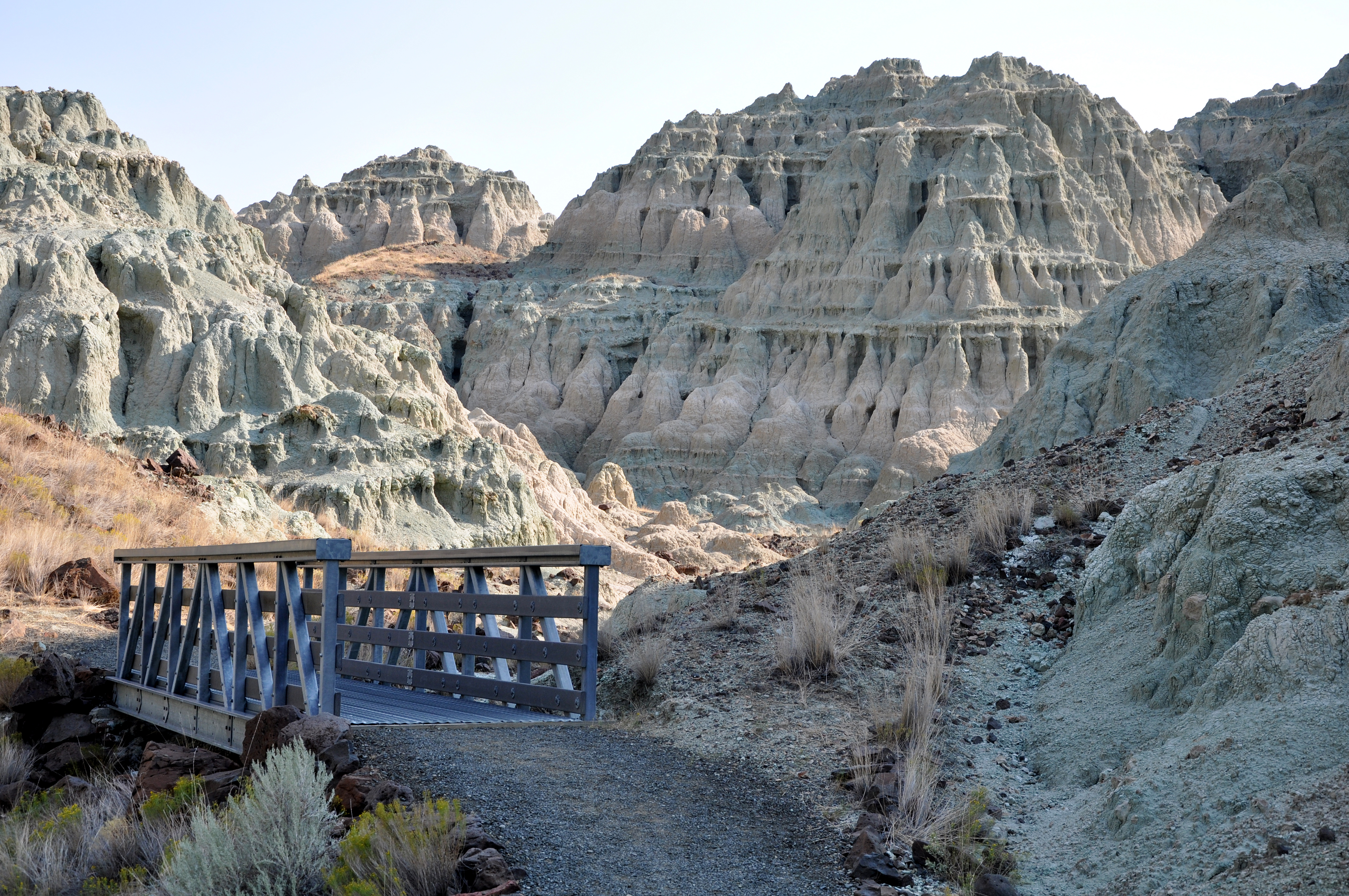
- Exposures of the Turtle Cove Member along a hiking trail in the Sheep Rock Unit of the John Day Fossil Beds National Monument
- Type: Sedimentary (mostly from clasts of igneous origin), igneous
- Underlies: Columbia River Basalt Group
- Overlies: Clarno Formation

Lithology
- Primary: Sandstone, tuff
- Other: Pyroclastic

Location
- Coordinates: 44°N 120°W
- Region: Central Oregon
- Country: United States

Type section
- Named for: John Day River
- John Day Formation (the United States) John Day Formation (Oregon)

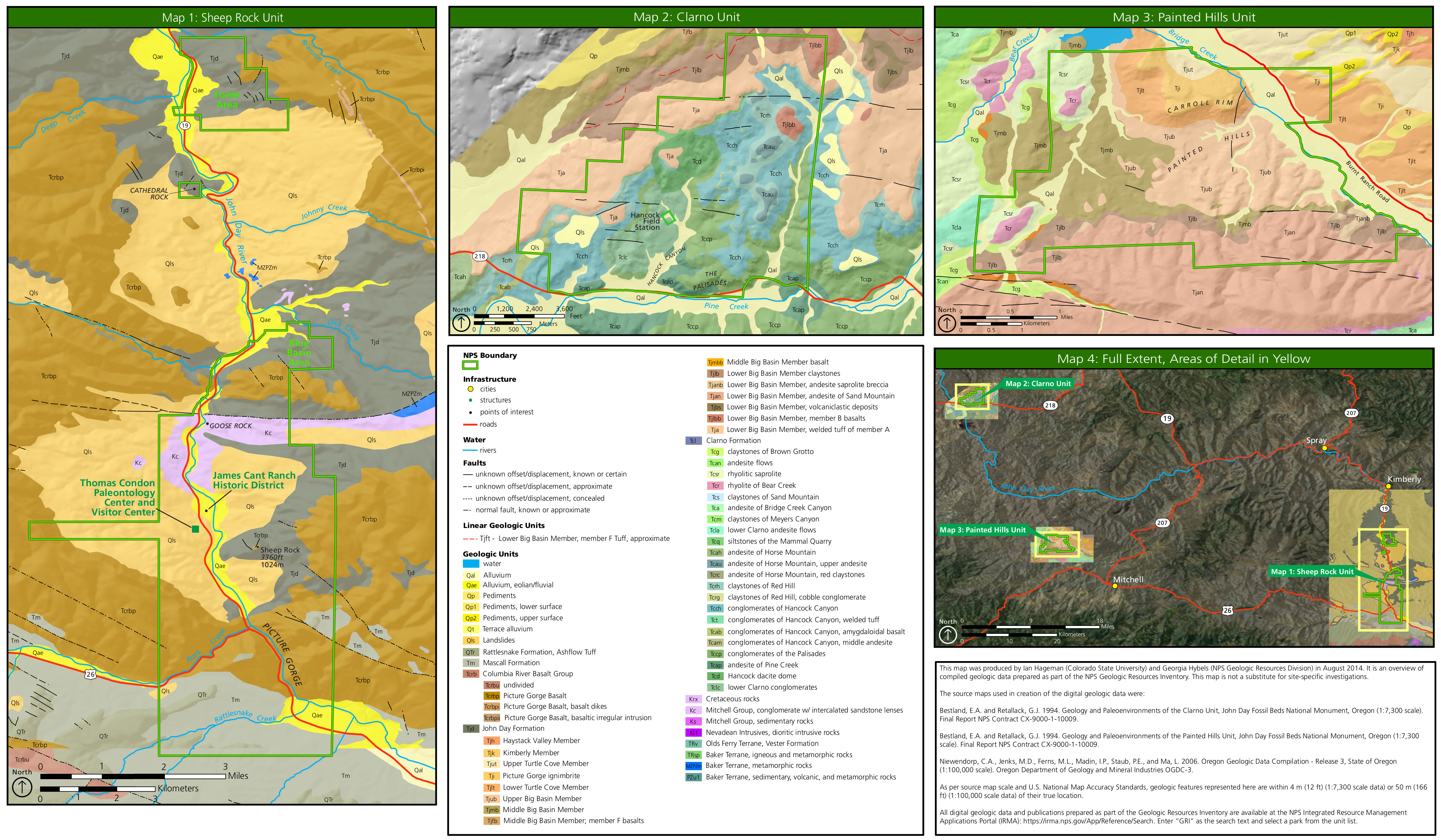
John Day Fossil Beds map

The John Day Formation is a series of rock strata exposed in the Picture Gorge district of the John Day River basin and elsewhere in north-central Oregon in the United States. The Picture Gorge exposure lies east of the Blue Mountains uplift, which cuts southwest–northeast through the Horse Heaven mining district northeast of Madras. Aside from the Picture Gorge district, which defines the type section, the formation is visible on the surface in two other areas; another exposure is in the Warm Springs district west of the uplift, between it and the Cascade Range, and the third is along the south side of the Ochoco Mountains. All three exposures, consisting mainly of tuffaceous sediments and pyroclastic rocks rich in silica, lie unconformably between the older rocks of the Clarno Formation below and Columbia River basalts above.

== Stratigraphy ==
The strata, which vary in age from 39 million years to 18 million years, were formed mainly from ashfalls from volcanoes due to a series of calderas now linked to the Yellowstone hotspot. Some of the major layers within the group exposed in the Picture Gorge district are the Big Basin Member and Bridge Creek Beds (35 to 32 million years), the Turtle Cove Member (30 to 28 million years), the Picture Gorge Ignimbrite (28.7 million years), the Kimberly Member (28 to 25 million years), and the Haystack Member (25 to 18 million years).

Located in the general vicinity of what became the Cascade Range, the John Day volcanoes emitted large volumes of ash and dust, much of which settled in the John Day basin. The rapid deposition of the ash preserved the remains of plants and animals living in the region. Some of the solidified ash and the fossils they contain are found in the John Day Fossil Beds National Monument. Because ash and other debris fell during varied climatic and volcanic conditions and accumulated from many eruptions extending into the early Miocene (about 20 million years ago), the sediment layers in the fossil beds vary in their substance, chemical composition and color. The lowermost layer contains red ash, such as that exposed in the Painted Hills Unit of the national monument. The layer above it is mainly pea-green clay. On top of the pea-green layer are buff-colored layers.

== Paleontology ==
Fossils found in the John Day Formation include a wide variety of plants and more than 100 species of mammals, including dogs, cats, oreodonts, horses, camels, and rodents. Among the notable plant fossils are Metasequoia (Dawn Redwood), a genus thought to have gone extinct worldwide until it was discovered alive in China in the early twentieth century.

Among the paleobiota found in the formation is the Daeodon, whose type species, Daeodon shoshonensis, has been found in the formation.

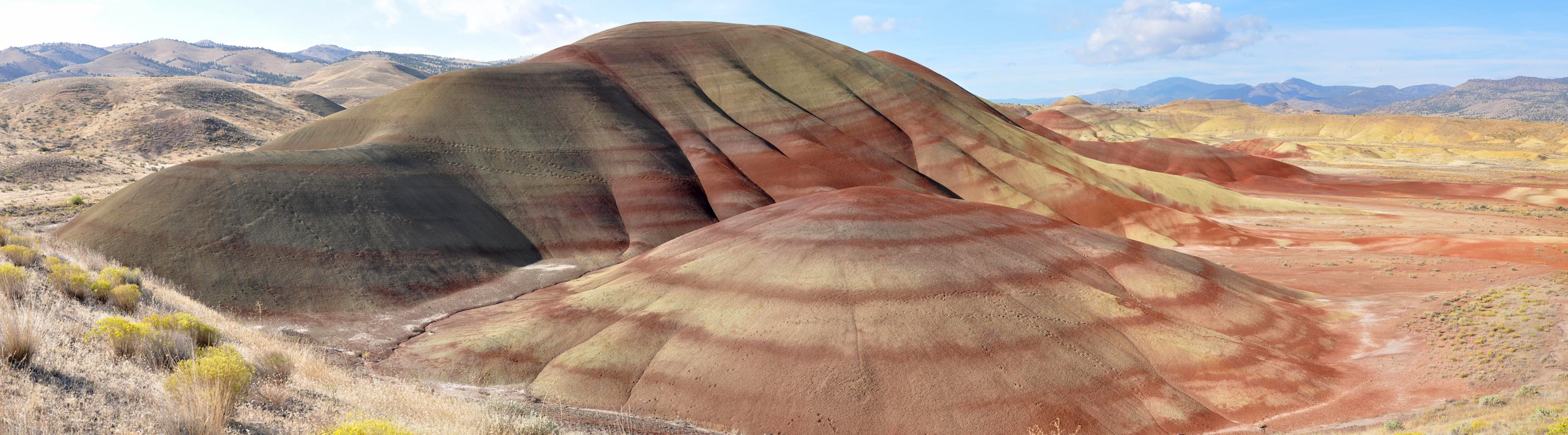
Panorama of some of the John Day Formation strata exposed in the Painted Hills Unit of the John Day Fossil Beds National Monument

Color key: Taxon / Reclassified taxon / Taxon falsely reported as present / Dubious taxon or junior synonym / Ichnotaxon / Ootaxon / Morphotaxon

Notes
Uncertain or tentative taxa are in small text
~~crossed out~~ taxa are discredited.

=== Mammals ===
==== Apatotheres ====
Genus	Species	Location	Stratigraphic position	Material	Notes	Images
Sinclairella	S. dakotensis	Blue Basin, Grant County, Oregon.	Turtle Cove Member.	Lower right incisor (JODA 15846) & upper right second molar (JODA 15850).	An apatemyid.	

==== Carnivorans ====
===== Amphicyonids =====
Genus	Species	Location	Stratigraphic position	Material	Notes	Images
Daphoenodon	D. robustum	Grant County, Oregon.	Rose Creek Member.	Teeth & astragalus.	A daphoenine amphicyonid (bear-dog) also found in the Runningwater & Zia Sand formations.	
Paradaphoenus	P. cuspigerus			Skull elements.	A daphoenine amphicyonid (bear-dog).	
Temnocyon	T. altigenis				A hyena-like temnocyonine amphicyonid (bear dog)	
Temnocyon	T. fingeruti				A hyena-like temnocyonine amphicyonid (bear dog)	

===== Canids =====
Genus	Species	Location	Stratigraphic position	Material	Notes	Images
Archaeocyon	A. pavidus	Picture Gorge 30, Blue Basin level 1.	Turtle Cove Member.	Maxillary & mandible fragments (UCMP 76652).	A borophagine dog.	
Cormocyon	C. copei	Wheeler & Grant counties, Oregon.	Turtle Cove Member.	Numerous specimens.	A borophagine dog also known from the Troublesome Formation.	
Cynarctoides	C. lemur	Wheeler & Grant counties, Oregon.	Turtle Cove Member.	Skull & jaw elements.	A borophagine dog also known from the Brule, Sharps & Browns Park formations.	
Desmocyon	D. thomsoni		Probably from the Haystack Valley Member.	Isolated right molars (AMNH 7238).	A borophagine dog also known from the Harrison Beds, Runningwater Formation & Zia Formation.	
Enhydrocyon	E. basilatus	Grant & Wheeler counties.	?Kimberly Member.	Skull and jaws.	A hesperocyonine dog also known from the Harrison Formation.	
Enhydrocyon	E. sectorius	Central Oregon, no detailed locality given.		Fragment of right maxillary (AMNH 6905).	A hesperocyonine dog.	
Enhydrocyon	E. stenocephalus	Grant County, Oregon.	Turtle Cove Member.	4 skulls.	A hesperocyonine dog.	
Leptocyon	L. douglassi	Between the Picture Gorge Ignimbrite & Deep Creek Tuff.	Turtle Cove Member.	Anterior part of skull (UCMP 79365).	A canine dog also known from the Toston & Sharps formations.	
Leptocyon	L. mollis	Turtle Cove, John Day River, Grant County, Oregon.	Turtle Cove Member.	Skull (UCMP 90).	A canine dog.	
Leptocyon	L. vulpinus	Wheeler County, Oregon.	Haystack Valley Member.	Fragment of right ramus.	A canine dog also known from the Harrison & Runningwater formations.	
Mesocyon	M. brachyops		May be from the Turtle Cove Member.	Skull elements & pelvis.	A hesperocyonine dog.	
Mesocyon	M. coryphaeus		Turtle Cove Member.	Numerous specimens.	A hesperocyonine dog.	
Osbornodon	O. sp.	Grant County, Oregon	Turtle Cove Member	m1 tooth	A hesperocyonine dog	
Otarocyon	O. sp.	Wheeler County, Oregon	Haystack Valley Member	m1 tooth	A small borophagine dog	
Paraenhydrocyon	P. josephi	Grant County, Oregon.	Turtle Cove Member.	Skull elements.	A hesperocyonine dog.	
Paraenhydrocyon	P. wallovianus	"John Day Badlands, Oregon".	May be from the Turtle Cove Member.	Crushed rostral part of skull (AMNH 6858).	A hesperocyonine dog also known from the Marsland & Harrison formations.	
Philotrox	P. condoni	Turtle Cove & Morgan Locality, Oregon.	Turtle Cove Member.	Skulls & vertebrae.	A hesperocyonine dog also known from the Sharps Formation.	
Phlaocyon	P. latidens	Grant & Wheeler counties, Oregon.	Turtle Cove Member.	Jaw elements.	A borophagine dog.	
Rhizocyon	R. oregonensis	Wheeler & Grant counties, Oregon.	Turtle Cove Member.	Skulls & jaw elements.	A borophagine dog.	

===== Felines =====
Genus	Species	Location	Stratigraphic position	Material	Notes	Images
Dinaelurus	D. crassus		Turtle Cove Member.	A mostly complete cranium.	A nimravid.	
Dinictis	D. felina		Turtle Cove Member.		A nimravid.	
Hoplophoneus	H. cerebralis		Turtle Cove Member.		A nimravid.	
Hoplophoneus	H. strigidens		Exact stratigraphic level unknown.	AMNH 6942, medial fragment of an upper canine.	A nimravid.	
Machaerodus	M. cerebralis		Turtle Cove Member.	A mostly complete cranium.	Reassigned to Hoplophoneus.	
Nimravus	N. brachyops		Turtle Cove & Kimberly members.		A nimravid.	
Palaeogale	P. dorothiae		Kimberly Member.	A left and a right dentary from separate individuals.	A palaeogalid.	
Palaeogale	P. sp.		Turtle Cove Member.	A largely complete cranium.	A palaeogalid & the oldest known occurrence of the genus in the Pacific Northwest.	
Pogonodon	P. davisi		Turtle Cove & Kimberly members.	Skull elements.	A nimravid also known from the White River, Brule & Sharps formations.	
Pogonodon	P. platycopsis		Turtle Cove Member.	Skull elements.	A nimravid also found in the White River Group & Brule Formation.	

===== Mustelids =====
Genus	Species	Location	Stratigraphic position	Material	Notes	Images
Corumictis	C. wolsani	Grant County, Oregon.	Turtle Cove & Kimberly members.	A nearly complete skull (JODA 8167) & a right dentary (JODA 396).	A small mustelid.	

==== Eulipotyphlans ====
Genus	Species	Location	Stratigraphic position	Material	Notes	Images
Micropternodus	M. morgani	Courtrock quadrangle, Grant County, Oregon.	Middle beds.	Rostrum (UCMP 60801).	A soricomorph.	

==== Metatherians ====
Genus	Species	Location	Stratigraphic position	Material	Notes	Images
Herpetotherium	H. merriami	Logan Butte, Crook County, Oregon.		Partial skull with teeth & mandible (UCMP 24240).	A herpetotheriid.	

==== Rodents ====
Genus	Species	Location	Stratigraphic position	Material	Notes	Images
Allotypomys	A. pictus	Grant & Wheeler counties.	Turtle Cove & possibly Kimberly members.	Jaw elements & teeth.	An eutypomyid.	
Apeomys	A. whistleri	Campbell Ranch, Gilliam County, Oregon.	Kimberly Member.	Jaw elements & teeth.	An eomyid.	
Bursagnathus	B. aterosseus	Grant County, Oregon.	Johnson Canyon & Rose Creek members.	2 nearly-complete skulls.	A perognathine.	
Leptodontomys	L. sp.	Campbell Ranch, Gilliam County, Oregon.	Kimberly Member.	Partial right dentary (JODA 12699).	An eomyid.	
Microtheriomys	M. brevirhinus	Grant County, Oregon.	Turtle Cove Member.	Skull elements.	A castorid.	
Miosciurus	M. ballovianus	Grant, Wheeler & Gilliam counties, Oregon.	Turtle Cove, Kimberly & Haystack Valley members.	Jaw elements & crushed skulls.	A squirrel.	
Miosciurus	M. covensis	Crook & Grant counties, Oregon.	Turtle Cove Member.	Jaw elements.	A squirrel.	
Miosciurus	M. sp.	Hayes Haven, Grant County, Oregon.	Turtle Cove Member.	Right partial dentary & associated postcranial fragments (JODA 4447).	A squirrel.	
Mookomys	M. sp.	Wheeler County, Oregon.	Haystack Valley Member.	Partial maxilla & left distal femur (JODA 7900).	A heteromyid.	
Neoadjidaumo	N. arctozophus	Crook & Grant counties, Oregon.	Turtle Cove Member.	Left dentary (JODA 16005) & right dentary (JODA 3615).	An eomyid.	
Palaeocastor	P. fossor	Grant & Wheeler counties.	Kimberly, Haystack Valley & possibly Johnson Canyon members.	Skull elements.	A castorid.	
Petauristodon	P. sp.	Campbell Ranch, Gilliam County, Oregon.	Kimberly Member.	Left molar (JODA 12597).	A flying squirrel.	
Plesiosminthus	P. fremdi	Campbell Ranch, Gilliam County, Oregon.	Kimberly Member.	Jaw elements.	A sicistine.	
Proapeomys	P. condoni	Grant & Crook counties, Oregon.	Turtle Cove Member.	Dentary & teeth.	An eomyid.	
Proapeomys	?P. lulli	Hayes Haven, Grant County, Oregon.	Turtle Cove Member.	Partial dentary (YPM 10573) & dentary fragment (JODA 16002).	An eomyid originally reported as Florentiamys lulli & Jimomys lulli.	
Proheteromys	P. latidens	Gilliam County, Oregon.	Kimberly Member.	Multiple specimens.	A heteromyid.	
Proheteromys	P. thorpei	Grant & Gilliam counties, Oregon	Turtle Cove & Kimberly members.	Partial dentaries & teeth.	A heteromyid.	
Protosciurus	P. mengi	Grant, Gilliam & Wheeler counties, Oregon.	Turtle Cove, Kimberly & Haystack Valley members.	Multiple specimens.	A squirrel.	
Protosciurus	P. rachelae	Grant, Gilliam & Wheeler counties, Oregon.	Turtle Cove & Kimberly members.	A nearly complete skull (UCMP 86367) & several teeth.	A squirrel.	
Tenudomys	T. sp.	Grant County, Oregon.	Haystack Valley Member.	Left dentary (JODA 3548).	A geomyoid.	
Trogomys	T. oregonensis	Hayes Haven, Grant County, Oregon.	Turtle Cove Member.	Left dentary (JODA 4534).	A heteromyid.	

==== Ungulates ====
===== Artiodactyls =====
Genus	Species	Location	Stratigraphic position	Material	Notes	Images
Archaeotherium	A. calkinsi		Upper Turtle Cove	Complete skull	An entelodont contains features of both Archaeotherium and Daeodon	
Daeodon	D. shoshonensis	Bridge Creek, Wasco County, Oregon.		Symphyseal fragment (AMNH 7387).	An entelodont.	
Desmatochoerus	D. curvidens	North Fork John Day River.	?Middle John Day deposits.	Partial skull & mandible (YPM 10997).	An oreodont.	
Desmatochoerus	D. leidyi	John Day Valley.	Upper John Day.	Multiple specimens.	An oreodont.	
Gentilicamelus	G. sternbergi	"The Cove" and possibly other localities.	Upper John Day Beds & possibly other parts of the Turtle Cove & Kimberly members.	Multiple specimens.	A camelid.	
Fremdohyus	F. osmonti	"About 6 miles north of Clarno's Ferry, Gilliam County, Oregon".	"Diceratherium beds, Middle John Day".	A nearly complete skull & mandible (UCMP 393).	A peccary.	
Marshochoerus	M. socialis		Level unknown but presumed to be late Arikareean.	Associated molars.	A peccary.	
Oreodontoides	O. (Paroreodon) marshi		Middle John Day.	10 specimens.	An oreodont.	
Oreodontoides	O. oregonensis		?Middle John Day.	14 specimens.	An oreodont.	
Oreodontoides	O. (Paroreodon) stocki			10 specimens.	An oreodont.	
Pseudodesmatochoerus	P. wascoënsis	Wasco County, Oregon.	Middle or upper John Day.	Partial skulls.	An oreodont.	
Superdesmatochoerus	S. lulli	Turtle Cove, John Day Valley.	Upper John Day.	Multiple specimens.	An oreodont.	
Superdesmatochoerus	S. microcephalus		Middle John Day.	6 specimens.	An oreodont.	
Thinohyus	T. lentus		Unknown level.	Broken juvenile skull (YPM 11783).	A peccary.	
Thinohyus	T. rostratus		Unknown level.	A complete skull (AMNH 7395).	A peccary.	

===== Perissodactyls =====
Genus	Species	Location	Stratigraphic position	Material	Notes	Images
Diceratherium	D. annectens			Numerous specimens.	A rhinoceros.	
Diceratherium	D. armatum			Numerous specimens.	A rhinoceros.	
Diceratherium	D. niobrarense			Numerous specimens.	Specimens reassigned to D. armatum & D. annectens.	
Moropus	M. oregonensis		Rose Creek Member.	Teeth & foot bones.	A chalicothere.	
Moropus	M. sp.		Rose Creek Member.	A juvenile maxilla.	A chalicothere.	

=== Reptiles ===
==== Squamates ====
Genus	Species	Location	Stratigraphic position	Material	Notes	Images
Dyticonastis	D. rensbergeri	North-central Oregon.	Uppermost Turtle Cove Member.	UCMP 76878-76883.	A worm lizard.	

=== Insects ===
Genus	Species	Location	Stratigraphic position	Material	Notes	Images
Curvellipsoentomoolithus	C. laddi	Turtle Cove member.	Twenty-six eggs or clusters of eggs, some preserved in Subterroothecichnus radialis ootheca.	Eggs of a Caeliferan.		Ootheca Subterroothecichnus containing eggs Curvellipsoentomoolithus.
Subterroothecichnus	S. radialis	Turtle Cove member.	Four oothecae, containing the eggs Curvellipsoentomoolithus laddi.	Oothecae of a Caeliferan.		
