= Phlaocyon mariae =

Phlaocyon mariae Temporal range: Miocene

Scientific classification
- Domain: Eukaryota
- Kingdom: Animalia
- Phylum: Chordata
- Class: Mammalia
- Order: Carnivora
- Family: Canidae
- Subfamily: †Borophaginae
- Tribe: †Phlaocyonini
- Genus: †Phlaocyon
- Species: †P. mariae

Binomial name
- †Phlaocyon mariae Wang, Tedford & Taylor 1999, p. 84

Extinct species of carnivore

Phlaocyon mariae is an extinct species of the genus Phlaocyon, belonging to the subfamily Borophaginae and tribe Phlaocyonini, a canid which inhabited central western North America from the Miocene living 20.6–16.3 Ma, and existed for approximately 4.3 million years.

Phlaocyon mariae was described and named by Wang, Tedford & Taylor 1999, the name honours S. Marie Skinner who assembled and documented specimens from Nebraska. The species is known from worn upper and lower teeth and skull fragments found at the Early Hemingfordian Aletomeryx Quarry Site, Runningwater Formation, Cherry County, Nebraska.

P. mariae is the largest Phlaocyon with teeth that display a mixture of hypo- and hypercarnivorous characters. Wang et al. noted that the poor preservation of P. mariae makes it difficult to assess its relationship within Phlaocyon, but, based on a cladistic analysis, concluded that P. mariae is one of the more derived species together with P. yatkolai and that these two species are the first and earliest borophagine to evolve hypercarnivory.
