= Phlaocyon yatkolai =

Phlaocyon yatkolai Temporal range: Hemingfordian

Scientific classification
- Domain: Eukaryota
- Kingdom: Animalia
- Phylum: Chordata
- Class: Mammalia
- Order: Carnivora
- Family: Canidae
- Subfamily: †Borophaginae
- Tribe: †Phlaocyonini
- Genus: †Phlaocyon
- Species: †P. yatkolai

Binomial name
- †Phlaocyon yatkolai Wang, Tedford & Taylor 1999, p. 83

Extinct species of carnivore

Phlaocyon yatkolai is an extinct species of canid mammal known from the early Hemingfordian (20.4 to 16 million years ago) Runningwater Formation, Box Butte County, Nebraska (42.2°N 103.1°W, paleocoordinates 42.9°N 99.2°W).

P. yatkolai, named after the collector late Daniel Yatkola, is known from a right dentary with teeth. It is a large species of Phlaocyon and it displays several derived characters in its dentition. These characters are, however, slightly less derived than in its sister taxon P. mariae. Wang et al. argued that these two species display a tendency towards hypercarnivorous dentition, in contrast to the hypocarnivorous dentition found in the other members of the genus.
