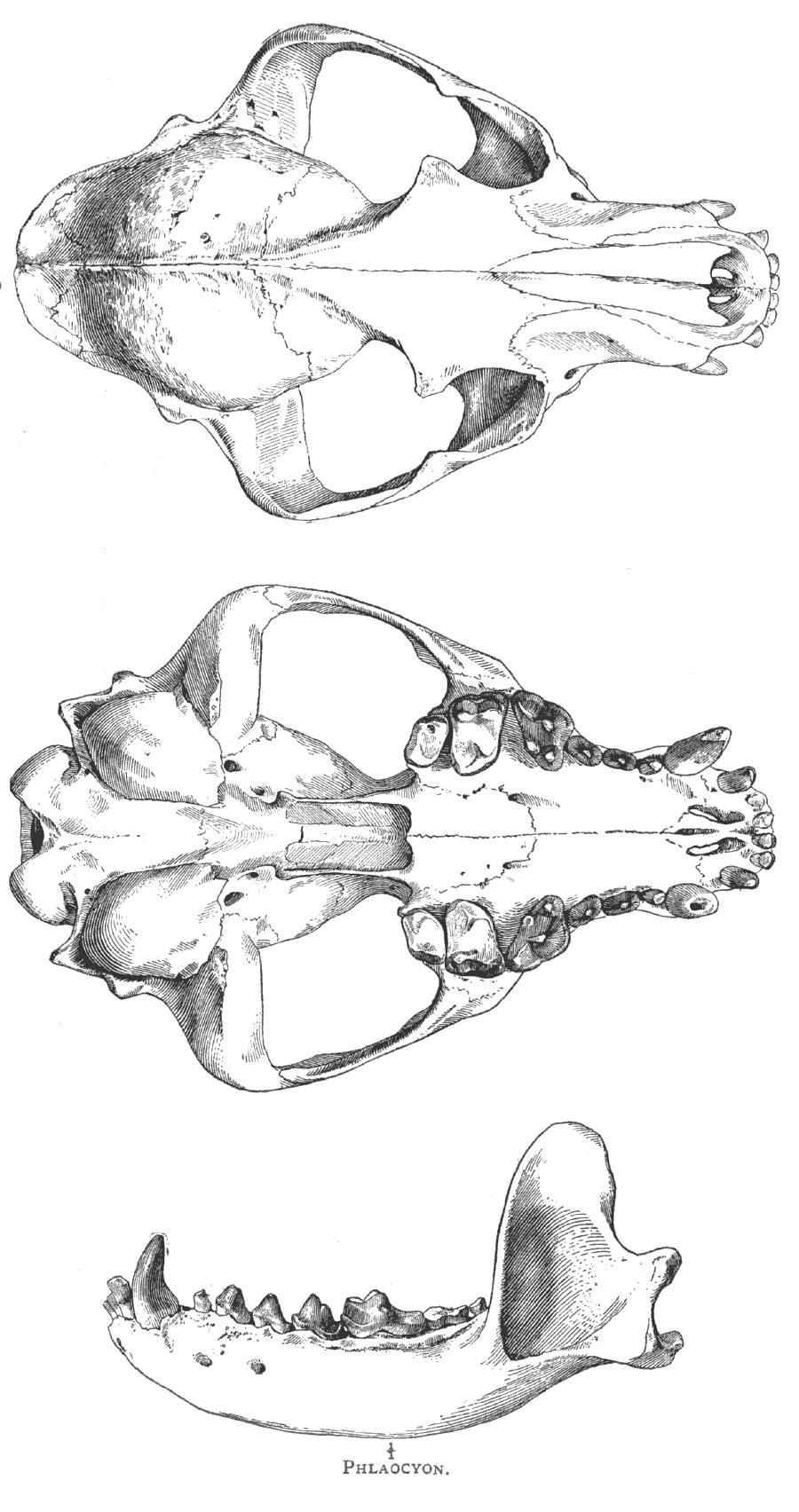
- Type specimen of Phlaocyon leucosteus

Scientific classification
- Kingdom: Animalia
- Phylum: Chordata
- Class: Mammalia
- Order: Carnivora
- Family: Canidae
- Subfamily: †Borophaginae
- Tribe: †Phlaocyonini
- Genus: †Phlaocyon; Matthew, 1899

Type species
- †P. leucosteus

Species
- See text

Synonyms
- Aletocyon Romer & Sutton 1927; Bassariscops Peterson 1924, p. 53

= Phlaocyon =

Phlaocyon Temporal range: Early Oligocene–Early Miocene

Extinct genus of carnivores

Phlaocyon (from Greek phlao, "eat greedily" and cyon, "dog") is an extinct genus of the Borophaginae subfamily of canids endemic to North America. It lives from the Early Oligocene to the Early Miocene epoch 33.3–16.3 Mya, existing for approximately 17.3 million years. It is closely related to Cynarctoides.

== Phylogeny ==
When discovered in the 19th century and during the following decades, Phlaocyon was thought to be ancestral to raccoons because of shared convergent adaptations toward hypocarnivorous dentitions, but Hough 1948 was the first to discover the canid nature of the middle ear region in P. leucosteus and Phlaocyon in now believed to be part of very diverse clade of hypocarnivorous canids, the Phlaocyonini, and only distantly related to raccoons.

P. mariae and P. yatkolai, both known from isolated teeth and fragmentary material, are the largest and most derived species, and both display a tendency away from the hypocarnivorous dentition of the genus and towards a more hypercarnivorous dentition.

== Anatomy ==
Phlaocyon was about 80 centimetres (31 in) in body length, and looked more like a cat or raccoon than a dog, but its skull anatomy shows it to be a primitive canid. Phlaocyon probably lived like a raccoon, often climbing trees. Its head was short, wide, and had forward-facing eyes. Unlike modern canides, Phlaocyon had no specialised teeth for slicing flesh. It is thought to have been an omnivore.

== Species ==
- †P. achoros Frailey 1979, p. 134
- †P. annectens Peterson 1907, p. 53
- †P. latidens Cope 1881, p. 181
- †P. leucosteus Matthew 1899, p. 54
- †P. mariae Wang, Tedford & Taylor 1999, p. 84
- †P. marslandensis McGrew 1941, p. 33
- †P. minor Matthew 1907, p. 189
- †P. multicuspus Romer & Sutton 1927
- †P. taylori Hayes 2000, p. 34
- †P. yatkolai Wang, Tedford & Taylor 1999, p. 83

== Fossil distribution ==
- Foree Site, John Day Formation, Wheeler County, Oregon (P. latidens) ~30.8–20.6 Ma.
- Brooksville 2 Site, Hernando County, Florida (P. taylori) ~30.8–20.6 Ma.
- SB-1A Live Oak Site, Suwannee County, Florida (P. leucosteus) ~24.8–20.6 Ma.
- Buda Mine, Alachua County, Florida (P. indent) ~24.8–20.6 Ma.
- Wewela Site, Tripp County, South Dakota (P. minor) ~26.3–24.8 Ma.

== Palaeobiology ==
=== Diet ===
Dental microwear of P. latidens indicates it had a modestly broad dietary niche. The species was a hypocarnivore that ate a modest proportion of hard, brittle foods that left pitting on its tooth occlusal surfaces.
