= Phlaocyon minor =

Phlaocyon minor Temporal range: Late Early Miocene

Scientific classification
- Domain: Eukaryota
- Kingdom: Animalia
- Phylum: Chordata
- Class: Mammalia
- Order: Carnivora
- Family: Canidae
- Subfamily: †Borophaginae
- Tribe: †Phlaocyonini
- Genus: †Phlaocyon
- Species: †P. minor

Binomial name
- †Phlaocyon minor Matthew 1907, p. 189

Synonyms
- Synodesmus minor Matthew 1907, p. 189; Tephrocyon sp. Wood & Wood 1937; Tomarctus minor White 1941; Nothocyon minor Cook & Macdonald 1962

Extinct species of carnivore

Phlaocyon minor is an extinct species of canid mammal known from the Miocene-Oligocene (Arikareean NALMA, more than 20 million years ago) of the United States (Wyoming, South Dakota, Nebraska, Wyoming, and Texas.)

The type specimen of P. minor is a partial maxilla, a partial dentary, and limb fragments found in Oglala Lakota County, South Dakota (43.3°N 102.5°E: paleocoordinates 44.1°N 97.4°W). Wang, Tedford & Taylor 1999 referred half a dozen other specimens to P. minor, including a nearly complete skull and a mandible from Wyoming.

P. minor is the most basal member of Phlaocyon but it can still be distinguished from more primitive borophagines such as Archaeocyon, Rhizocyon, and Cynarctoides. Characters placing it in Phlaocyon includes robust and shortened premolars, a quadrate first upper molar, and widened talonid on the first lower molar. Characters unique to P. minor include the double temporal crests and the elongated lower second molar.
