= Phlaocyon latidens =

Phlaocyon latidens Temporal range: Oligocene–Miocene

Scientific classification
- Domain: Eukaryota
- Kingdom: Animalia
- Phylum: Chordata
- Class: Mammalia
- Order: Carnivora
- Family: Canidae
- Subfamily: †Borophaginae
- Tribe: †Phlaocyonini
- Genus: †Phlaocyon
- Species: †P. latidens

Binomial name
- †Phlaocyon latidens Cope 1881, p. 181

Synonyms
- Galecynus latidens Cope 1881, p. 181; Cynodictis latidens Scott 1898, p. 364

Extinct species of carnivore

Phlaocyon latidens is an extinct species of the genus Phlaocyon, belonging to the subfamily Borophaginae and tribe Phlaocyonini, a canid which inhabited northwestern North America from the Late Oligocene to Miocene living 33.3–20.6 mya and existed for approximately 12.7 million years.

== Taxonomy ==
Phlaocyon latidens was originally named Galecynus latidens by Cope 1881. It was recombined as Cynodictis latidens by Scott 1898; it was recombined as Nothocyon latidens by Matthew 1899, Merriam (1906), Matthew 1907, Peterson 1907, Thorpe (1922), Hall and Martin (1930), Macdonald (1963) and Macdonald (1970); it was recombined as Cormocyon latidens by Wang and Fremd (1994); it was recombined as Phlaocyon latidens by Wang, Tedford & Taylor 1999.

== Fossil distribution ==
- North Blue Basin Site, John Day Formation, Grant County, Oregon ~33.3–30.8 Ma.
- Foree Site, John Day Formation, Wheeler County, Oregon ~30.8–20.6 Ma.
