= Phlaocyon achoros =

Phlaocyon achoros Temporal range: Miocene

Scientific classification
- Domain: Eukaryota
- Kingdom: Animalia
- Phylum: Chordata
- Class: Mammalia
- Order: Carnivora
- Family: Canidae
- Subfamily: †Borophaginae
- Tribe: †Phlaocyonini
- Genus: †Phlaocyon
- Species: †P. achoros

Binomial name
- †Phlaocyon achoros Frailey 1979, p. 134

Synonyms
- Bassariscops achoros Frailey 1979

Extinct species of carnivore

Phlaocyon achoros is an extinct species of the genus Phlaocyon, belonging to the subfamily Borophaginae and tribe Phlaocyonini, a canid which inhabited the southeastern North America from the Late Oligocene to Miocene living 24.6—20.8 mya and existed for approximately 4.2 million years.

== Taxonomy ==
Phlaocyon achoros was named by Frailey 1979. Its type locality is Buda Mine, which is in a Harrisonian sinkhole horizon in Florida. It was recombined as Phlaocyon achoros by Wang, Tedford & Taylor 1999 and Hayes 2000.

== Fossil distribution ==
Only known from Buda Mine Site, Alachua County, Florida ~24.8—20.6 Ma.
