= Phlaocyon annectens =

Phlaocyon annectens Temporal range: Oligocene–Miocene

Scientific classification
- Domain: Eukaryota
- Kingdom: Animalia
- Phylum: Chordata
- Class: Mammalia
- Order: Carnivora
- Family: Canidae
- Subfamily: †Borophaginae
- Tribe: †Phlaocyonini
- Genus: †Phlaocyon
- Species: †P. annectens

Binomial name
- †Phlaocyon annectens Peterson 1907, p. 53

Synonyms
- Nothocyon annectens Peterson 1907; Bassariscops willstoni

Extinct species of carnivore

Phlaocyon annectens is an extinct species of the genus Phlaocyon, belonging to the subfamily Borophaginae and tribe Phlaocyonini, a canid endemic to central and western North America from the Late Oligocene to Early Miocene living 24.6—20.8 mya and existed for approximately 4.2 million years.

== Taxonomy ==
Phlaocyon annectens was named by Peterson 1907. Its type locality is Beardog Hill, which is in a Harrisonian fluvial sandstone in the Upper Harrison Beds Formation of Nebraska. It was recombined as Phlaocyon annectens by Vanderhill (1980) and Wang, Tedford & Taylor 1999.

== Fossil distribution ==
- Castolon (TMM 40635), Brewster County, Texas ~24.8—20.6 Ma.
- American Museum-Cook Quarry, Sioux County, Nebraska ~24.8—20.6 Ma.
- Van Tassel, Niobrara County, Wyoming ~24.8—20.6 Ma.
- Beardog Hill, Upper Harrison Beds Formation, Sioux County, Nebraska ~24.8—20.6 Ma.
