= Lacrimodon =

Lacrimodon Temporal range: Burdigalian

Scientific classification
- Kingdom: Animalia
- Phylum: Chordata
- Class: Mammalia
- Order: Eulipotyphla
- Family: †Dimylidae
- Genus: †Lacrimodon
- Species: †L. vandermeuleni

Binomial name
- †Lacrimodon vandermeuleni Van den Hoek Ostende & Fejfar, 2015

Extinct genus of dimylid

Lacrimodon is an extinct genus of dimylid that lived during the Burdigalian stage of the Miocene epoch.

== Distribution ==
Lacrimodon vandermeuleni is known from the site of Akníkov 1 in Czechia.
