= Curvellipsoentomoolithus laddi and Subterroothecichnus radialis =

Curvellipsoentomoolithus laddi Temporal range: 29 Ma

Egg fossil classification
- Kingdom: Animalia
- Phylum: Arthropoda
- Clade: Pancrustacea
- Class: Insecta
- Oofamily: †Entomoolithidae
- Oogenus: †Curvellipsoentomoolithus
- Oospecies: †Curvellipsoentomoolithus laddi Lee et al. 2024

Binomial name
- Curvellipsoentomoolithus laddi Lee et al. 2024

Fossil grasshopper eggs and nests

Subterroothecichnus radialis Temporal range: 29 Ma

Trace fossil classification
- Kingdom: Animalia
- Phylum: Arthropoda
- Clade: Pancrustacea
- Class: Insecta
- Ichnofamily: †Entomoothecichnidae
- Ichnogenus: †Subterroothecichnus
- Ichnospecies: †Subterroothecichnus radialis Lee et al. 2024

Binomial name
- Subterroothecichnus radialis Lee et al. 2024

Curvellipsoentomoolithus laddi and Subterroothecichnus radialis are the parataxonomic names for certain fossil insect eggs and corresponding oothecae (egg pods), respectively, from the Oligocene of Oregon, United States. They are known from multiple exquisitely-preserved specimens. They are believed to have been produced by grasshoppers of the suborder Caelifera, and represent the oldest unambiguous evidence of buried grasshopper ootheca in the fossil record. C. laddi is the first invertebrate ootaxon to be described as such.

== Description ==
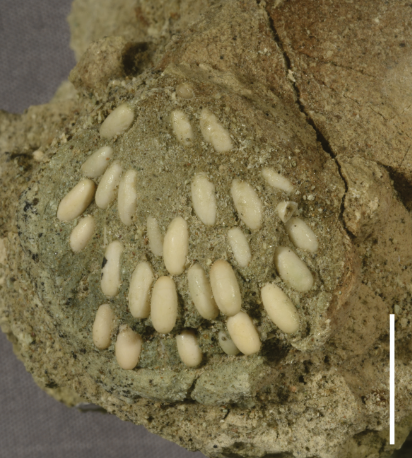
Type specimen ootheca and eggs. Scale bar is 1 centimetre (0.39 in).

The type specimen of both C. laddi and S. radialis, specimen number JODA 17384, is a well-preserved ootheca with 28 eggs visible on the surface layer and more eggs hidden underneath (the exact count is unknown, it is estimated to contain around 50 eggs in total). Four other fossil ootheca of S. radialis are known, each of which also preserves eggs of C. laddi. An additional 22 specimens of isolated or clustered eggs referred to C. laddi have been found.

The ootheca, or egg pods, are disc-shaped, with a cylindrical plug at the apex preserved in some specimens. The wall of the ootheca was made of cemented soil particles and had a thickness of 1.4–2.1 mm (0.055–0.083 in) in the midsection, while the wall is somewhat thicker at the top and bottom ends. The ootheca contained about 50 eggs, arranged in multiple layers pointing radially towards the apex. The eggs large for insect eggs, measuring 4.48–4.65 mm (0.176–0.183 in) long and 1.63–1.84 mm (0.064–0.072 in) wide. Their shape is ellipsoidal and slightly curved. The eggs are tightly packed, showing that they probably did not shrink during the preservation process. The chorion of C. laddi is sculptured with small oval protrusions, which is one of many types of sculpturing known among modern grasshopper eggs.

The orientation of the eggs indicates that the mother grasshopper inserted her ovipositor at a shallow angle into the soil. The ootheca was produced in the ground. Both caeliferans and mantophasmatodeans insert their ovipositor into the ground and produce it underground. The overall shape of S. radialis most closely resembles the egg pod of Hieroglyphus concolor.

The identification of the producer of the ootheca S. radialis and the eggs C. laddi as a caeliferan is based on many traits. The size and shape of the ootheca and eggs resemble those of modern caeliferans. Furthermore, the large number of eggs in the ootheca is most consistent with Orthoptera, as other insects do not lay such large eggs in clutches of this size. Within Orthoptera, only Caelifera are known to have subterrainian ootheca.

== Parataxonomy ==
Fossils related to animal activity are classified separately from animals themselves, due to the rarity of definitive association between an animal and its eggs, oothecae, footprints, or other non-bodily traces. Oothecae are classified as ichnotaxa, and the ichnospecies Subterroothecichnus radialis is the sole described ichnospecies of the ichnogenus Subterroothecichnus, which in turn is classified in the ichnofamily Entomoothecichnidae, alongside other fossil insect oothetca ichnotaxa such as Oothecichnus and Blattoothecichnus.

Fossil amniotic eggs are traditionally classified by their own parataxonomic system of oofamilies, oogenera, and oospecies. The oospecies Curvellipsoentomoolithus laddi is the first oogenus and oospecies described for any invertebrate eggs. Insect egg fossils are quite rare, due to the fragillity and small size of insect eggs, nonetheless some other fossil insect eggs had previously been described as species. Lee et al. (2024), who described C. laddi, recommended that these be reclassified as oospecies due to the lack of association with body fossils. They classified Curvellipsoentomoolithus and these other oospecies in the oofamily Entomoolithidae, an oofamily erected to include all known fossil insect eggs.

== Distribution ==
The known specimens of Curvellipsoentomoolithus laddi and Subterroothecichnus radialis are all from the Turtle Cove Member of the John Day Fossil Beds National Monument in Kimberly, Oregon. The Turtle Cove Member dates to 29 million years ago, during the Oligocene. At the time, this site was a wooded grassland.

== Discovery and significance ==
The type specimen JODA 17384 was first discovered in 2012 by Christopher Schierup, a collections manager of the National Parks Center. This was one of many fossil insect egg discoveries made in the John Day Fossil Beds since the 1990s, and was assumed to come from ants. In 2016, the fossil was catalogued by Nicholas Famoso, an Oregonian paleontologist working for the John Day Fossil Beds National Monument, who at the time did not recognize its significance. Later, when he realized that the eggs matched the descriptions of modern grasshopper eggs, he teamed up with Jaemin Lee, a doctoral student at UC Berkeley, and Angela Lin, director of the University of Oregon's X-ray imaging research core facility, to analyze the fossil more carefully.

In 2024, Lee, Famoso, and Lin published the results of their analysis. They assigned the eggs to a new oogenus and oospecies Curvellipsoentomoolithus laddi, the first use of ootaxonomy for invertebrate eggs. The oogenus name refers to the curved elliptical shape of the egg, with the suffix "-entomoolithus", which was proposed by the researchers as a standard oogeneric suffix for fossil insect eggs. The suffix "-oolithus" (meaning "stone egg" in Greek) is conventionally used for fossil eggs, and Lee et al. chose to include "entom" (meaning "insect" in Greek) to distinguish the naming convention from that of amniote ootaxa. The oospecific epithet "laddi" honors Benjamin Ladd, who was the first National Park Service superintendent of the John Day Fossil Beds National Monument, and served in that position from 1975 to 1993. The ootheca of JODA 17384 was also classified as a new ichnogenus and ichnospecies, Subterroothecichnus radialis. The ichnogeneric name is derived from the Latin subterra ("underground"), the Greek ootheca ("egg case"), and Greek ichnos ("trace"). The ichnospecific epithet refers to the radial arrangement of the eggs in the ootheca.

These eggs were recognized as the first definitive evidence of subterrainian grasshopper ootheca. However, identification of insect ootheca and egg fossils is quite difficult; they are often misidentified as parts of plants or seeds. One fossil from the late Pliocene to Quaternary of the Canary Islands may also represent an underground grasshopper ootheca, but that fossil is the subject of conflicting interpretations. In any case, the Oregonian Subterranoothecichnus radialis would be the oldest fossil of a subterrainian grasshopper ootheca, and are the oldest known orthopteran eggs.

Following the announcement of the discovery, the fossil was put on display at the John Day Fossil Beds visitor center.
