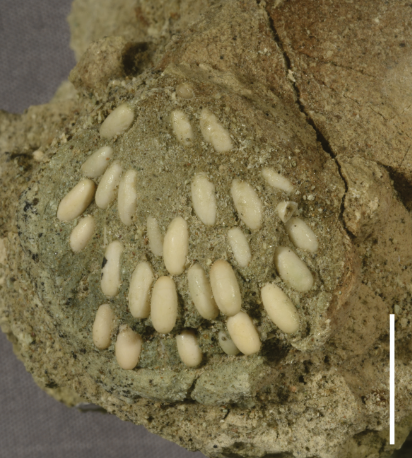
- Type specimen of Curvellipsoentomoolithus laddi.

Egg fossil classification
- Kingdom: Animalia
- Phylum: Arthropoda
- Clade: Pancrustacea
- Class: Insecta
- Oofamily: †Entomoolithidae; Lee et al. 2024

Oogenera
- Curvellipsoentomoolithus; Paleoovidus

= Entomoolithidae =

Oofamily of fossil insect eggs

Entomoolithidae is an oofamily of fossil insect eggs. Insect egg preservation is incredibly rare, due to their small size and fragile consistency. Furthermore, even when eggs are preserved, they are often misidentified as parts of plants. Impressions of insect eggs on plants are classified in the ichnofamily Paleoovoididae.
