= Cambaylophus =

Cambaylophus Temporal range: early Eocene, 55–54 Ma

Scientific classification
- Kingdom: Animalia
- Phylum: Chordata
- Class: Mammalia
- Order: Perissodactyla
- Clade: Tapiromorpha
- Genus: †Cambaylophus; Kapur & Bajpai, 2015

Type species
- †Cambaylophus vastanensis Kapur & Bajpai, 2015

Extinct genus of mammals

Cambaylophus is an extinct genus of tapiromorph (tapir and rhino relatives) from the early Eocene of India. It is known from a single species, Cambaylophus vastanensis, based on a maxilla fragment. The fossil was found in the Vastan Lignite Mine in Gujarat, within strata of the Cambay Shale Formation (about 54-55 million years ago). It is the oldest known tapiromorph from South Asia, part of an early Bumbanian mammal fauna close to the collision between the Indian subcontinent and the rest of Asia. It might also be the earliest perissodactyl from India, though the contemporaneous cambaytheres may qualify for this title as well.

== Description ==
The only preserved bone of Cambaylophus is a right maxilla fragment including the last two deciduous premolars (dP3-dP4), two fully erupted molars (M1-M2), and a partially erupted third molar (M3). There is no gap between the premolars and molars. Like other early tapiromorphs, the molars are roughly square-shaped, with four major cusps (protocone, paracone, metacone, hypocone) and two transverse crests or lophs (protoloph, metaloph). Compared to other early tapiromorphs, the molars are smaller and narrower (from side to side), and their lophs are less strongly developed.

The buccal cusps (the paracone and metacone, on the cheek side of each molar) are taller than the lingual cusps (the protocone and hypocone, on the tongue side). Apart from the main cusps, Cambaylophus also has a small parastyle, a small cusp shifted lingually, directly in front of the paracone. Other early tapiromorphs tend to have a larger and more buccally-positioned parastyle. Cambaylophus does not have a paraconule on its protoloph, but it does have a subtle metaconule on the metaloph.

== Classification ==
Cambaylophus is one of many early tapiromorphs within the paraphyletic "isectolophid" group. A phylogenetic analysis in its 2015 description placed it closest to Gandheralophus (from early Eocene Pakistan), followed by Orientolophus (from early Eocene China).
