= Madju =

Madju Temporal range: Chattian–Tortonian

Scientific classification
- Kingdom: Animalia
- Phylum: Chordata
- Class: Mammalia
- Infraclass: Marsupialia
- Order: Peramelemorphia
- Superfamily: †Perameloidea
- Genus: †Madju; Travouillon et al., 2014

Type species
- Madju variae Travouillon et al., 2014

Other species
- Madju encorensis Travouillon et al., 2014

Extinct genus of perameloid marsupial

Madju is an extinct genus of peramelemorphian marsupial that lived in Australia from the Chattian to the Tortonian stages of the Oligocene and Miocene epochs.

== Etymology ==
The generic name Madju is derived from a Waanyi word meaning "sister", referencing the similarity of the genus to recent bandicoots. The specific epithet of the type species of the genus, Madju variae, derives from the Latin word varius, meaning variable and referencing the sexually dimorphic nature of the species. The specific epithet of the species Madju encorensis is named after the Encore Site, the type locality of the species.
