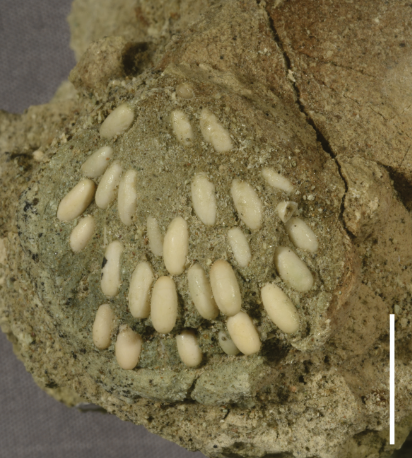
- Type specimen of Subterroothecichnus radialis

Trace fossil classification
- Kingdom: Animalia
- Phylum: Arthropoda
- Clade: Pancrustacea
- Class: Insecta
- Ichnofamily: †Entomoothecichnidae
- Ichnogenus: †Subterroothecichnus; Lee et al. 2024

Ichnospecies
- Subterroothecichnus radialis

= Subterroothecichnus =

Subterroothecichnus Temporal range: Oligocene-recent

Subterroothecichnus is an ichnogenus which is defined to contain the fossil oothecae that are produced underground and have walls incorporating soil particles. It was first named be Lee et al. (2024), who defined it in this way to include the oothecae of Caelifera and Mantophasmatodea. Unlike other insects, these insects produce their ootheca underground by mixing their oothecal secretion with the surrounding soil in an underground chamber.

Currently, it contains only one described ichnospecies, Subterroothecichnus radialis, which represents the eggs of an unknown grasshopper species from the Oligocene of Oregon. These are large, disc-shaped oothecae, known from multiple well-preserved specimens, representing the oldest known fossils of grasshopper oothecae. Additionally, some fossils from the Canary Islands dated to the late Pliocene to Quaternary are tentatively assigned to Subterroothecichnus as well. They are distinct from S. radialis in size and shape, and resemble the egg pods of Dociostaurus maroccanus. However, they have alternately been interpreted as hymenopteran brood chambers or coleopteran pupal chambers. Micrtomographic analysis is required to definitively identify them.
