= Namagale =

Namagale Temporal range: Bartonian

Scientific classification
- Kingdom: Animalia
- Phylum: Chordata
- Class: Mammalia
- Order: Afrosoricida
- Suborder: Tenrecomorpha
- Family: Potamogalidae
- Genus: †Namagale
- Species: †N. grandis

Binomial name
- †Namagale grandis Pickford, 2015

Extinct genus of mammals

Namagale is an extinct genus of potamogalid that lived during the Bartonian stage of the Eocene epoch.

== Distribution ==
Namagale grandis is known from the Eocliff Limestone of Namibia.
