= Arenagale =

Arenagale Temporal range: Bartonian

Scientific classification
- Kingdom: Animalia
- Phylum: Chordata
- Class: Mammalia
- Order: Afrosoricida
- Suborder: Tenrecomorpha
- Family: Tenrecidae
- Genus: †Arenagale
- Species: †A. calcareus

Binomial name
- †Arenagale calcareus Pickford, 2015

Extinct genus of mammals

Arenagale is an extinct genus of tenrecid that lived during the Bartonian stage of the Eocene epoch.

== Distribution ==
Arenagale calcareus is known from the Eocliff Limestone of Namibia.
