= Microtheriomys =

Microtheriomys Temporal range: Late Oligocene
- Partial skull (seen from below) from John Day Fossil Beds National Monument

Scientific classification
- Kingdom: Animalia
- Phylum: Chordata
- Class: Mammalia
- Order: Rodentia
- Family: Castoridae
- Subfamily: †Agnotocastorinae
- Tribe: †Anchitheriomyini
- Genus: †Microtheriomys; Korth & Samuels, 2015
- Species: †M. brevirhinus

Binomial name
- †Microtheriomys brevirhinus Korth & Samuels, 2015

Extinct genus of rodents

Microtheriomys is an extinct genus of anchitheriomyine castorid (beaver) that lived during the Arikareean.

== Distribution ==
Microtheriomys brevirhinus is known from the John Day Formation of Oregon.
