= Bursagnathus =

Bursagnathus Temporal range: Late Oligocene

Scientific classification
- Kingdom: Animalia
- Phylum: Chordata
- Class: Mammalia
- Infraclass: Placentalia
- Order: Rodentia
- Family: Heteromyidae
- Genus: †Bursagnathus; Korth & Samuels, 2015
- Species: †B. aterosseus

Binomial name
- †Bursagnathus aterosseus Korth & Samuels, 2015

Extinct genus of rodents

Bursagnathus is an extinct genus of heteromyid rodent that lived during the Arikareean.

== Distribution ==
Bursagnathus aterosseus is known from the John Day Formation of Oregon.
