= Mus denizliensis =

Mus denizliensis Temporal range: Early Pleistocene

Scientific classification
- Kingdom: Animalia
- Phylum: Chordata
- Class: Mammalia
- Infraclass: Placentalia
- Order: Rodentia
- Family: Muridae
- Genus: Mus
- Species: †M. denizliensis

Binomial name
- †Mus denizliensis Erten et al., 2015

Extinct species of rodent

Mus denizliensis is an extinct species of Mus that inhabited the Denizli Basin of Turkey during the Early Pleistocene.
