= Prozenkerella =

Prozenkerella Temporal range: Early Oligocene

Scientific classification
- Kingdom: Animalia
- Phylum: Chordata
- Class: Mammalia
- Infraclass: Placentalia
- Order: Rodentia
- Family: Anomaluridae
- Genus: †Prozenkerella; Coster et al., 2015
- Species: †P. saharaensis

Binomial name
- †Prozenkerella saharaensis Coster et al., 2015

Extinct genus of rodents

Prozenkerella is an extinct genus of anomalurid that lived during the Rupelian stage of the Oligocene epoch.

== Distribution ==
Prozenkerella saharaensis is known from Libya.
