= Sperrgale =

Sperrgale Temporal range: Bartonian

Scientific classification
- Kingdom: Animalia
- Phylum: Chordata
- Class: Mammalia
- Order: Afrosoricida
- Suborder: Tenrecomorpha
- Family: Tenrecidae
- Genus: †Sperrgale
- Species: †S. minutus

Binomial name
- †Sperrgale minutus Pickford, 2015

Extinct genus of mammals

Sperrgale is an extinct genus of tenrecid that lived during the Bartonian stage of the Eocene epoch.

== Distribution ==
Sperrgale minutus is known from the Eocliff Limestone of Namibia.
