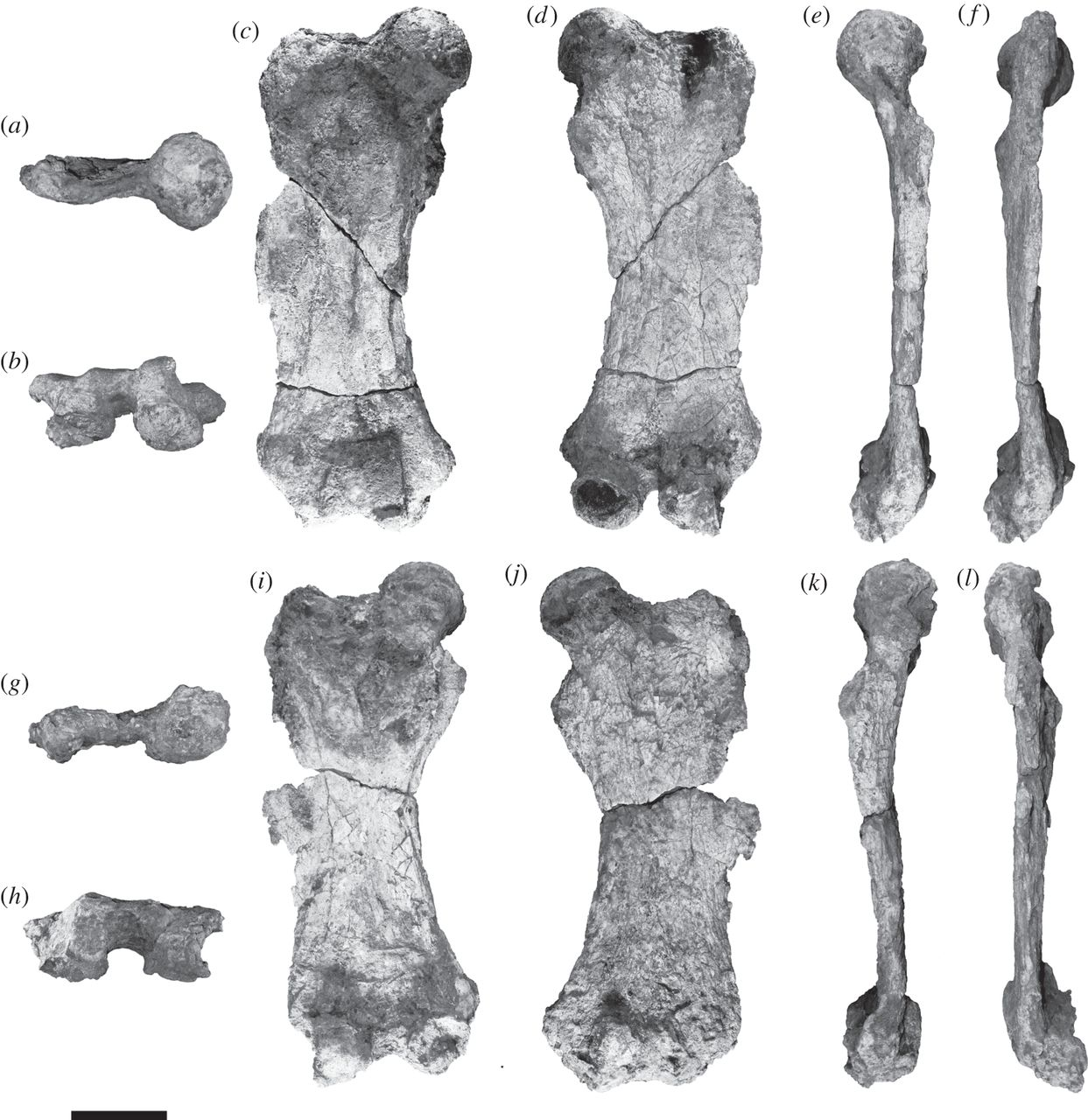
- Right and left femurs

Scientific classification
- Kingdom: Animalia
- Phylum: Chordata
- Class: Mammalia
- Order: Pilosa
- Family: †Mylodontidae
- Genus: †Eionaletherium; Rincón et al., 2015
- Species: †E. tanycnemius

Binomial name
- †Eionaletherium tanycnemius Rincón et al., 2015

= Eionaletherium =

Eionaletherium Temporal range: Mid-Late Miocene (Friasian-Montehermosan) ~15.97–5.332 Ma

Possibly marine ground sloth from Venezuela

Eionaletherium is an extinct genus of ground sloth from the Late Miocene coasts of Venezuela containing one species: E. tanycnemius.

== Taxonomy ==
Eionaletherium was discovered in the Late Miocene Urumaco Formation in the Falcón State of Venezuela and described in 2015 as a species of mylodontid ground sloth. It is a member of the family Mylodontidae in a clade including Bolivartherium, and Glossotherium. The holotype specimen, IVIC-P-2870, housed at the Venezuelan Institute for Scientific Research, comprises the femurs, a tibia, fibula, some vertebrae, and fragments of the scapulae, ribs, and the ankle bone.

The genus name Eionaletherium comes from the Greek words eion (shore), ale (wanderer), and therium (beast), in reference to the nearshore environment it probably inhabited. The species name tanycnemius comes from Greek tany (long) and cnemius (shin).

== Description ==
Eionaletherium, based on a femur-to-body-size ratio, is estimated to have been 1,098 kg (2,421 lb), smaller than contemporary ground sloths.

The tibia of Eionaletherium is unusually long for ground sloths, being 87% the size of the length of the femur versus the 45% to 73% in other mylodonts. The contemporary marine sloth Thalassocnus also developed this as an aquatic adaptation, so Eionaletherium may have been partially aquatic. However, the bones are not particularly dense (pachyosteosclerosis) to negate buoyancy, and the femoral head is missing indicating it could not create powerful strokes necessary for swimming.

== Paleoecology ==
The Urumaco sequence contains 3 formations–Socorro, Urumaco, and Codore formations–which date to the Middle Miocene to Early Pliocene, the Urumaco Formation from the Chasicoan to the Huayquerian according to the SALMA classification system. This area is representative of a nearshore coastal environment with river deltas emptying into it. Other ground sloths discovered here are Urumaquia, Urumacotherium, Mirandabradys socorrensis, M. zabasi, M. urumaquensis, B. coderensis, B. urumaquensis, and Magdalenabradys confusum.

A wide array of fish–including sharks and rays–crocodiles, turtle, and small mammals have also been found in the Urumaco Formation.

== See also ==
- Thalassocnus
- Ahytherium
