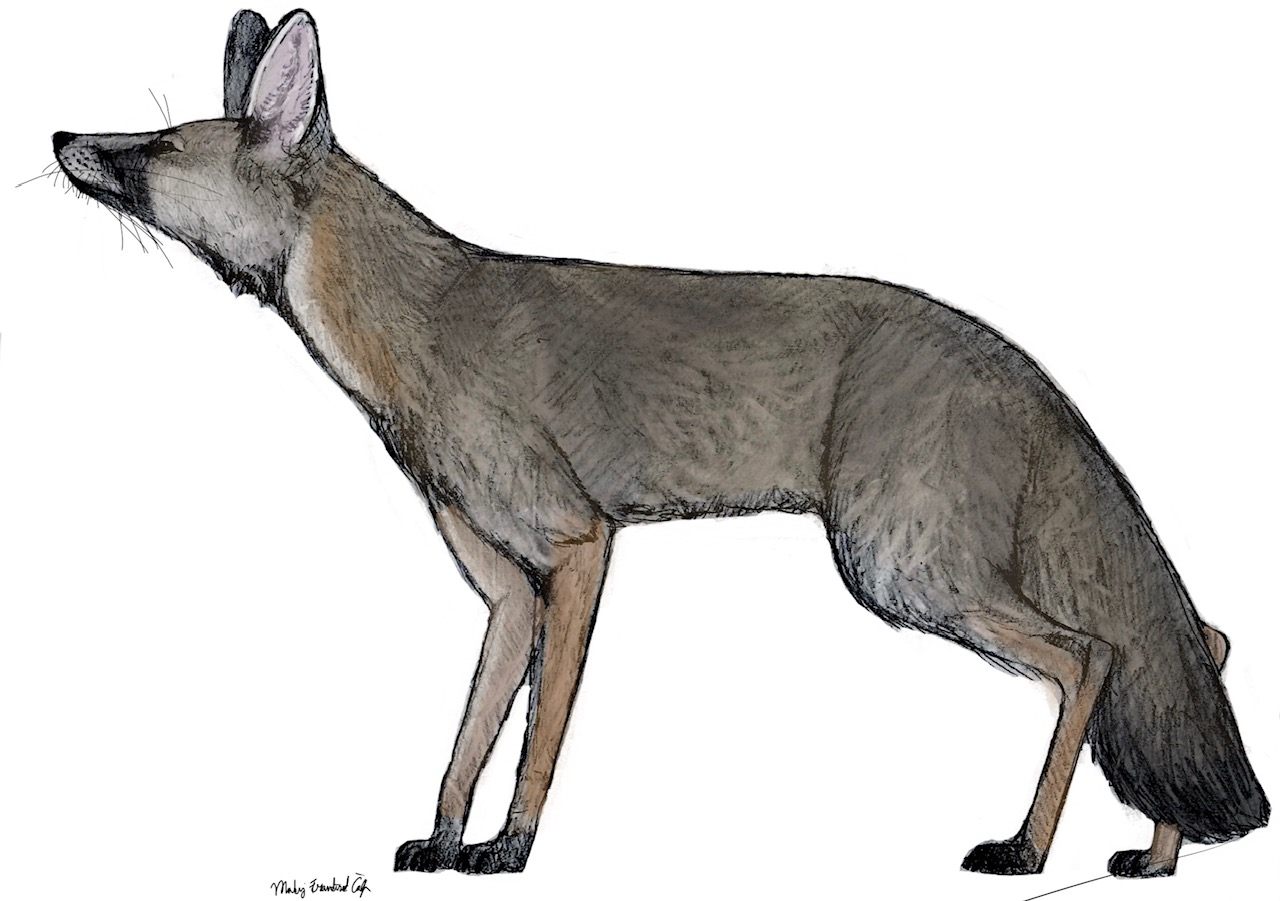

Scientific classification
- Kingdom: Animalia
- Phylum: Chordata
- Class: Mammalia
- Infraclass: Placentalia
- Order: Carnivora
- Family: Canidae
- Genus: Vulpes
- Species: V. mathisoni

Binomial name
- Vulpes mathisoni Geraads et al., 2015

= Vulpes mathisoni =

Vulpes mathisoni Temporal range: Early Pliocene

Extinct species of fox

Vulpes mathisoni is an extinct species of Vulpes that lived during the Early Pliocene. It has been named in honor of Mark Mathison, the fossil collector.

== Distribution ==
Vulpes mathisoni fossils are known from the Mursi Formation located in Ethiopia.
