= Proafricanomys =

Proafricanomys Temporal range: Tortonian

Scientific classification
- Kingdom: Animalia
- Phylum: Chordata
- Class: Mammalia
- Infraclass: Placentalia
- Order: Rodentia
- Family: Ctenodactylidae
- Genus: †Proafricanomys; López-Antoñanzas et al., 2015
- Species: †P. libanensis

Binomial name
- †Proafricanomys libanensis López-Antoñanzas et al., 2015

Extinct genus of rodents

Proafricanomys is an extinct genus of ctenodactylid that lived during the Tortonian stage of the Miocene epoch.

== Distribution ==
Pproafricanomys libanensis is known from Lebanon.
