= Entomoothecichnidae =

Trace fossil classification
- Kingdom: Animalia
- Phylum: Arthropoda
- Clade: Pancrustacea
- Class: Insecta
- Ichnofamily: †Entomoothecichnidae; Lee et al. 2024

Ichnogenera
- Blattoothecichnus; Oothecichnus; Subterroothecichnus

Family of insect trace fossils

Entomoothecichnidae is an ichnofamily consisting of known fossil oothecae (egg capsules) of insects. It was first erected in 2024 by Jaemin Lee, Nicholas Famoso, and Angela Lin, in order to aid systematic classification of fossil oothecae.
