= Sivacobus =

Sivacobus Temporal range: Late Pliocene - Late Pleistocene 2.7–0.2 Ma

Scientific classification
- Kingdom: Animalia
- Phylum: Chordata
- Class: Mammalia
- Order: Artiodactyla
- Family: Bovidae
- Subfamily: Reduncinae
- Genus: †Sivacobus; Pilgrim, 1939

Species
- †Sivacobus palaeindicus Lydekker, 1885; †Sivacobus patulicornis Lydekker, 1878; †Sivacobus sankaliai Vrba et al, 2015

Synonyms
- Genus synonymy: Gangicobus Pilgrim, 1939; Hydaspicobus Pilgrim, 1939; Indoredunca Pilgrim, 1939; Sivadenota Pligrim, 1939; Vishnucobus Pilgrim, 1939; S. palaeindicus synonymy: Kobus palaeindicus

Extinct genus of antelope

Sivacobus is an extinct genus of antelope that lived in South Asia during the Plio-Pleistocene.

Sivacobus was the only known member of the antelope subfamily Reduncinae to occur outside of Africa. Previously, the Asian reduncines were assigned to at least six genera, but newer studies suggest that only three species, all in Sivacobus, are valid. Most records of this genus are known from the Siwalik Pinjor Formation dated from 2.7 to 0.6 Ma. In 2015 a new species named Sivacobus sankaliai was described from an assemblage near Gopnath, northwestern India. The assemblage has been dated to under 200 ka, extending the temporal range of the genus, by over 300,000 years.
