= Kachchhchoerus =

Kachchhchoerus Temporal range: Late Miocene

Scientific classification
- Kingdom: Animalia
- Phylum: Chordata
- Class: Mammalia
- Order: Artiodactyla
- Family: Suidae
- Genus: †Kachchhchoerus
- Species: †K. salinus

Binomial name
- †Kachchhchoerus salinus Pilgrim, 1926

Extinct genus of mammals

Kachchhchoerus is an extinct genus of suid that lived during the Late Miocene.

== Distribution ==
Kachchhchoerus salinus is known from fossils found in India.
