= Allotypomys =

Allotypomys Temporal range: Late Oligocene

Scientific classification
- Kingdom: Animalia
- Phylum: Chordata
- Class: Mammalia
- Order: Rodentia
- Family: †Eutypomyidae
- Genus: †Allotypomys
- Species: †A. pictus

Binomial name
- †Allotypomys pictus Korth & Samuels, 2015

Extinct genus of rodents

Allotypomys is an extinct genus of eutypomyid that lived during the Arikareean.

== Distribution ==
Allotypomys pictus is known from the John Day Formation of Oregon.
