= Myanmarcolobus =

Myanmarcolobus Temporal range: Neogene

Scientific classification
- Kingdom: Animalia
- Phylum: Chordata
- Class: Mammalia
- Infraclass: Placentalia
- Order: Primates
- Family: Cercopithecidae
- Genus: †Myanmarcolobus
- Species: †M. yawensis

Binomial name
- †Myanmarcolobus yawensis Takai et al., 2015

Extinct genus of mammals

Myanmarcolobus is an extinct genus of colobine primate that inhabited Myanmar during the Neogene period. It is a monotypic genus containing the species M. yawensis.
