= Lamugaulus =

Lamugaulus Temporal range: Early Miocene

Scientific classification
- Kingdom: Animalia
- Phylum: Chordata
- Class: Mammalia
- Infraclass: Placentalia
- Order: Rodentia
- Family: †Mylagaulidae
- Genus: †Lamugaulus; Tesakov & Lopatin, 2015
- Species: †L. olkhonensis

Binomial name
- †Lamugaulus olkhonensis Tesakov & Lopatin, 2015

Extinct genus of rodents

Lamugaulus is an extinct genus of mylagaulid rodent that inhabited Eastern Siberia during the Early Miocene. It contains a single species, L. olkhonensis.
