= Tirotherium =

Tirotherium Temporal range: Santonian–Campanian

Scientific classification
- Kingdom: Animalia
- Phylum: Chordata
- Class: Mammalia
- Clade: Boreosphenida
- Family: †Picopsidae
- Genus: †Tirotherium
- Species: †T. aptum

Binomial name
- †Tirotherium aptum Montellano-Ballesteros and Fox, 2015

Extinct genus of boreosphenidan

Tirotherium is an extinct genus of boreosphenidan mammal that lived in Alberta during the Santonian and Campanian stages of the epoch.

== Taxonomy ==
Tirotherium likely belongs to the family Picopsidae within Boreosphenida, although its placement in this family is not certain.
