= Marshochoerus =

Marshochoerus Temporal range: Early Miocene

Scientific classification
- Kingdom: Animalia
- Phylum: Chordata
- Class: Mammalia
- Order: Artiodactyla
- Family: Tayassuidae
- Genus: †Marshochoerus
- Species: †M. socialis

Binomial name
- †Marshochoerus socialis Marsh, 1875

Extinct genus of mammals

Marshochoerus is an extinct genus of peccary that lived during the Early Miocene.

== Distribution ==
Marshochoerus socialis fossils are known from the United States.
