= Eutypomyidae =

Eutypomyidae Temporal range: Early Eocene - Early Miocene (Wasatchian - Arikareean)
- Partial lower jaw of Allotypomys

Scientific classification
- Kingdom: Animalia
- Phylum: Chordata
- Class: Mammalia
- Order: Rodentia
- Superfamily: Castoroidea
- Family: †Eutypomyidae; Miller & Gidley, 1918

Genera
- †Allotypomys; †Eutypomys; †Janimus; †Mattimys?; †Microeutypomys

Extinct family of rodents

Eutypomyidae is a family of extinct rodents from the Eocene to Miocene of North America, often considered the sister taxon to beavers (Castoridae). Eutypomyids lived from the Wasatchian NALMA (earliest Eocene) up to the Arikareean NALMA (early Miocene).

Eutypomyids probably had a squirrel-like lifestyle, and their skeletal anatomy is similar to other generalized early rodents such as ischyromyids, eomyids, and sciuravids. Both the snout and braincase are rather low and long, the jaw muscles have a sciuromorphous attachment to the snout, and the lower jaw has a sciurognathous structure. Functional analyses suggest that Eutypomys was terrestrial, with no strong adaptations for either digging or swimming.

Eutypomyids share with beavers a unique arrangement of skull foramina. Their quadrate (square-shaped) cheek teeth develop a complex pattern of ridges, folds, and enamel rings in later species, though earlier eutypomyids have low tooth crowns unlike modern beavers. Other major differences from most beavers include parallel tooth rows (rather than converging towards the front), a fourth premolar similar in size to the molars (instead of being larger), and the retention of an upper third premolar. This gives eutypomyids a dental formula of 1.0.2.31.0.1.3. Many of these traits are retained by early agnotocastorine beavers, which can only be distinguished from eutypomyids through subtler aspects of their tooth structure.

Anchitheriomys is a rodent which lived across North America and Eurasia during the Oligocene and Miocene. Though sometimes listed as a eutypomyid, most studies classify it as an early beaver.
