= Dimylus =

Dimylus Temporal range: Miocene

Scientific classification
- Domain: Eukaryota
- Kingdom: Animalia
- Phylum: Chordata
- Class: Mammalia
- Order: Eulipotyphla
- Superfamily: Talpoidea
- Family: †Dimylidae
- Genus: †Dimylus von Meyer, 1846

Dimylus is an extinct genus of insectivore mammal.

The creature probably resembled the modern desman in terms of size (10–20 cm in length) and physical appearance, possessing a proboscis. Its knobby teeth were small (no longer than 3,6 mm) and covered with enamel. Coupled with powerful jaw muscles this made Dimylus capable of crushing armored creatures such as crustaceans. Dimylus has been found in Europe, in areas that were abundant with water in the time it existed, suggesting it filled the same ecological niche as the modern desmans.
