= Hypocarnivore =

Animals with less than 30% meat in their diets

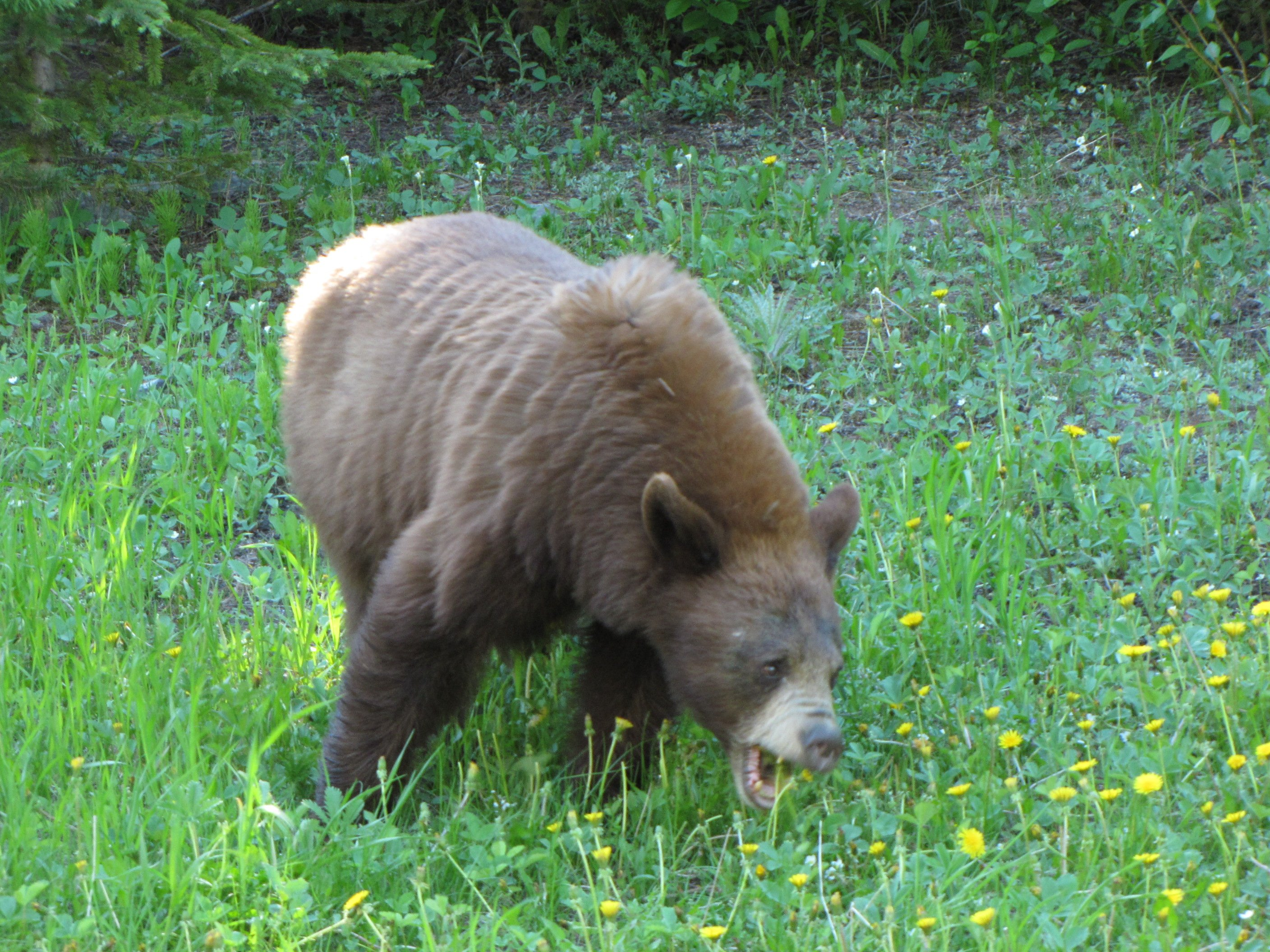
A black bear eating dandelions – an example of a hypocarnivore

A hypocarnivore is an animal that consumes less than 30% meat for its diet, the majority of which consists of fungi, fruits, and other plant material. Examples of living hypocarnivores are the grizzly bear (Ursus arctos horribilis), black bear (Ursus americanus), binturong (Arctictis binturong) and kinkajou (Potos flavus).

== Evolutionary history ==
The evolutionary division of carnivorans into three groups, including hypercarnivore and mesocarnivore, appears to have occurred about 40 million years ago (mya). The term hypocarnivory is used with increasing frequency in describing early Canidae evolution, and reliance upon that survival strategy has a documented history in North American Borophaginae during the Miocene (23.03 to 5.33 mya). Twenty-five species of hypocarnivore are documented as co-occurring on the North American continent 30 mya. A shift from hyper- to hypo- occurred at least three times among Oligocene and Miocene canids Oxetocyon, Phlaocyon, and Cynarctus.

Large hypocarnivores (Ursus) were rare and developed in the mid-to-late Miocene-Pliocene as borophagines became extinct.

== Dentition ==
Examination of dentition shows that post-carnassial molar volume expands with hypocarnivores while decreasing in hypercarnivores. Prohesperocyon (38 mya—33.9 mya) displayed a shift in relative proportion between slicing and grinding functions indicative of a dietary shift away from vertebrate foods to one including fruits.

== See also ==
- List of feeding behaviours
- Omnivore
