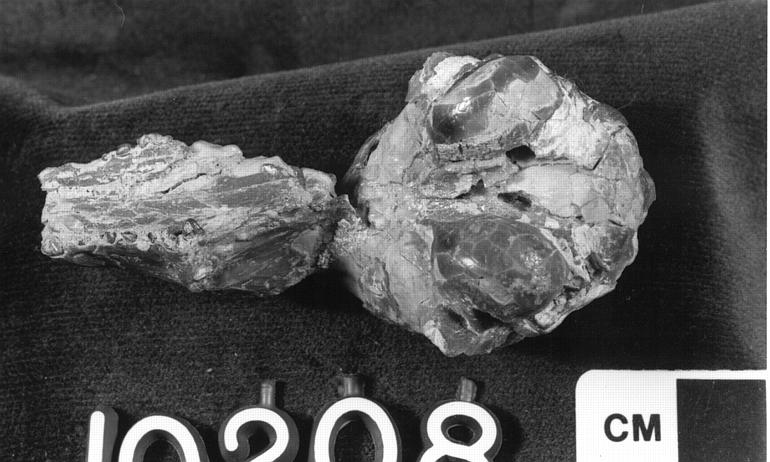
- Cynarctoides lemur fossil, University of California Museum of Paleontology.

Scientific classification
- Kingdom: Animalia
- Phylum: Chordata
- Class: Mammalia
- Order: Carnivora
- Suborder: Caniformia
- Family: Canidae
- Subfamily: †Borophaginae
- Tribe: †Phlaocyonini
- Genus: †Cynarctoides; McGrew, 1938

Species
- See text
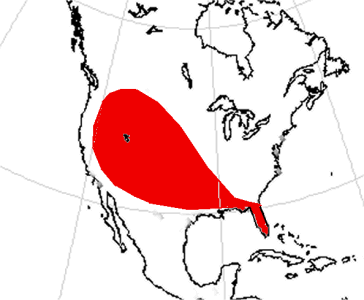
- Range of Cynarctoides based on fossil record

= Cynarctoides =

Cynarctoides Temporal range: Oligocene–Middle Miocene

Extinct genus of carnivores

Cynarctoides is an extinct genus of the Borophaginae subfamily of canids endemic to North America. It lived from the Early Oligocene to the Middle Miocene, 33.3—13.6 Mya, existing for approximately 19.7 million years. Seven species are currently recognised, all of which are estimated to have weighed no more than 1 kilogram (2.2 lb).

== Description ==
The genus had an unusual dentition that implies an omnivorous, or possibly even herbivorous, diet. Its Hunter-Schreger bands were undulating, indicating it was not adapted for durophagy.

== Species ==
- Cynarctoides acridens Barbour & Cook 1914 (syn. Cynarctus mustelinus) - Wyoming, California, New Mexico, Texas, ~20.6—16.3 Ma
- Cynarctoides emryi Wang et al. 1999 - Nebraska ~20.6—16.3 Ma
- Cynarctoides gawnae Wang et al. 1999 - New Mexico ~20.3—5.3 Ma
- Cynarctoides harlowi Loomis 1932 - Wyoming ~24.8—20.6 Ma
- Cynarctoides lemur Cope 1879 - Oregon, South Dakota, Florida ~24.8—20.6 Ma
- Cynarctoides luskensis Wang et al. 1999 - Wyoming ~24.8—20.6 M
- Cynarctoides roii Macdonald 1963 - South Dakota, Nebraska ~30.8—26.3 Ma

Fossil evidence suggests that C. lemur migrated to the east and southeast over time becoming extinct in the northwest followed by the upper Great Plains and then the southeast.
