= Hypercarnivore =

Animals with more than 70% meat in their diets

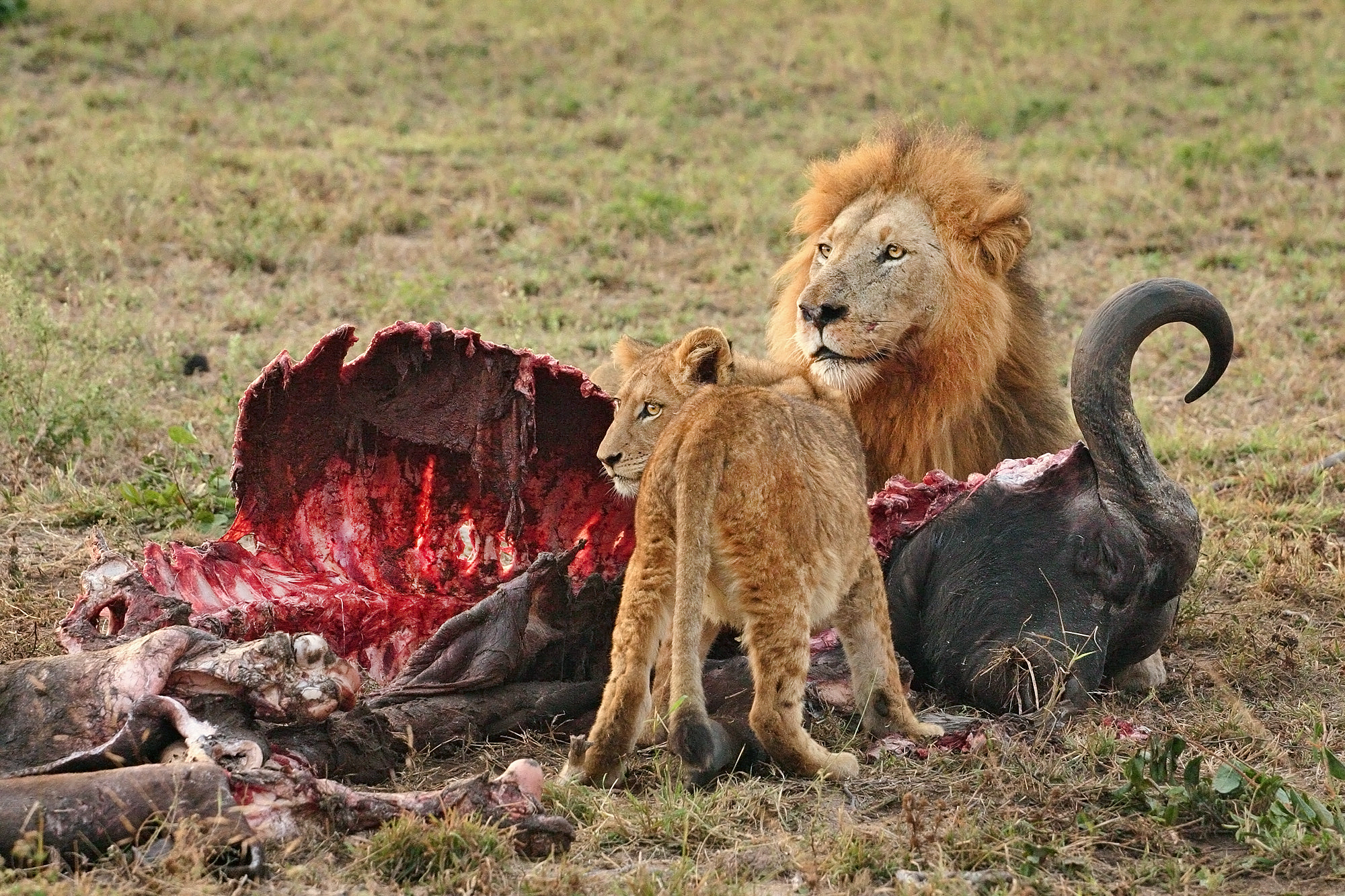
The lion, like all felids in their natural state, is a hypercarnivore.

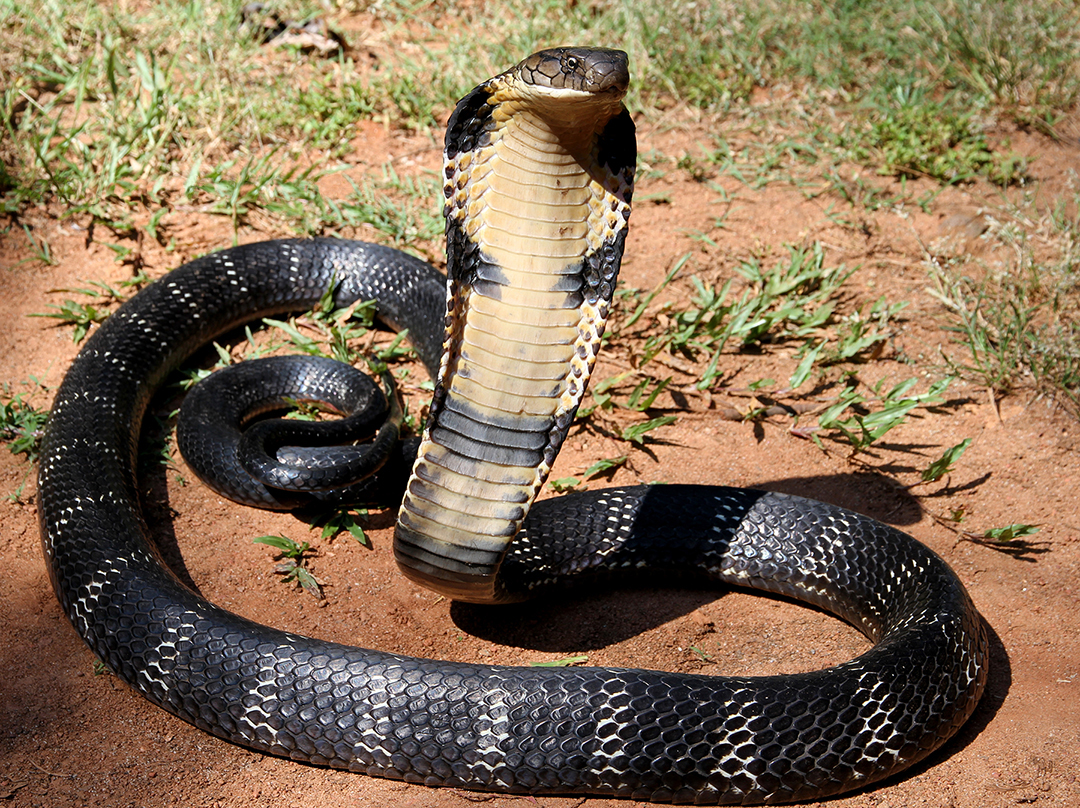
Most snakes, such as this king cobra, are hypercarnivores.

A hypercarnivore is a carnivorous animal that has a diet that is more than 70% meat, either via active predation or by scavenging. The remaining non-meat diet may consist of non-animal foods such as fungi, fruits, or other plant material. Some extant examples of hypercarnivorous animals include crocodilians, owls, shrikes, eagles, vultures, felids, some wild canids, polar bears, toothed whales, snakes, spiders, scorpions, mantises, marlins, groupers, piranhas and most sharks. Every species in the family Felidae, including the domesticated cat, is a hypercarnivore in its natural state. Additionally, this term is also used in paleobiology to describe taxa of animals which have an increased slicing component of their dentition relative to the grinding component. In domestic settings, e.g. cats may have a diet derived from only plant and synthetic sources using modern processing methods. Feeding farmed animals such as alligators and crocodiles mostly or fully plant-based feed is sometimes done to save costs or as an environmentally friendly alternative. Hypercarnivores are not necessarily apex predators. For example, salmon are exclusively carnivorous, yet they are prey at all stages of life for a variety of organisms.

As an example of related species with differing diets, even though they diverged only 150,000 years ago, the polar bear is the most highly carnivorous bear (more than 90% of its diet is meat) while the grizzly bear is one of the least carnivorous in many locales, with less than 10% of its diet being meat.

The genomes of the Tasmanian devil, killer whale, polar bear, leopard, lion, tiger, cheetah and domestic cat were analysed: shared positive selection for two genes have been found related to bone development and repair (DMP1, PTN), which is not a development seen in either omnivores or herbivores. This indicates that a stronger bone structure is a crucial requirement and drives selection towards predatory hypercarnivore lifestyle in mammals. Positive selection of one gene related to enhanced bone mineralisation has been found in the Scimitar-toothed cat (Homotherium latidens).

Animals that live almost exclusively on food of animal origin are incapable of biosynthesizing arachidonic acid. This characteristic has been found in the lion, the domestic cat, the turbot, and even the haematophagous mosquito.

In hypercarnivore mammals, the enzyme alanine:glyoxylate aminotransferase is expressed mainly or exclusively in the mitochondria, which would allow glyoxylate to be metabolised from the hydroxyproline present in animal matter.

== See also ==
- Hypocarnivore
- List of feeding behaviours
- Mesocarnivore
