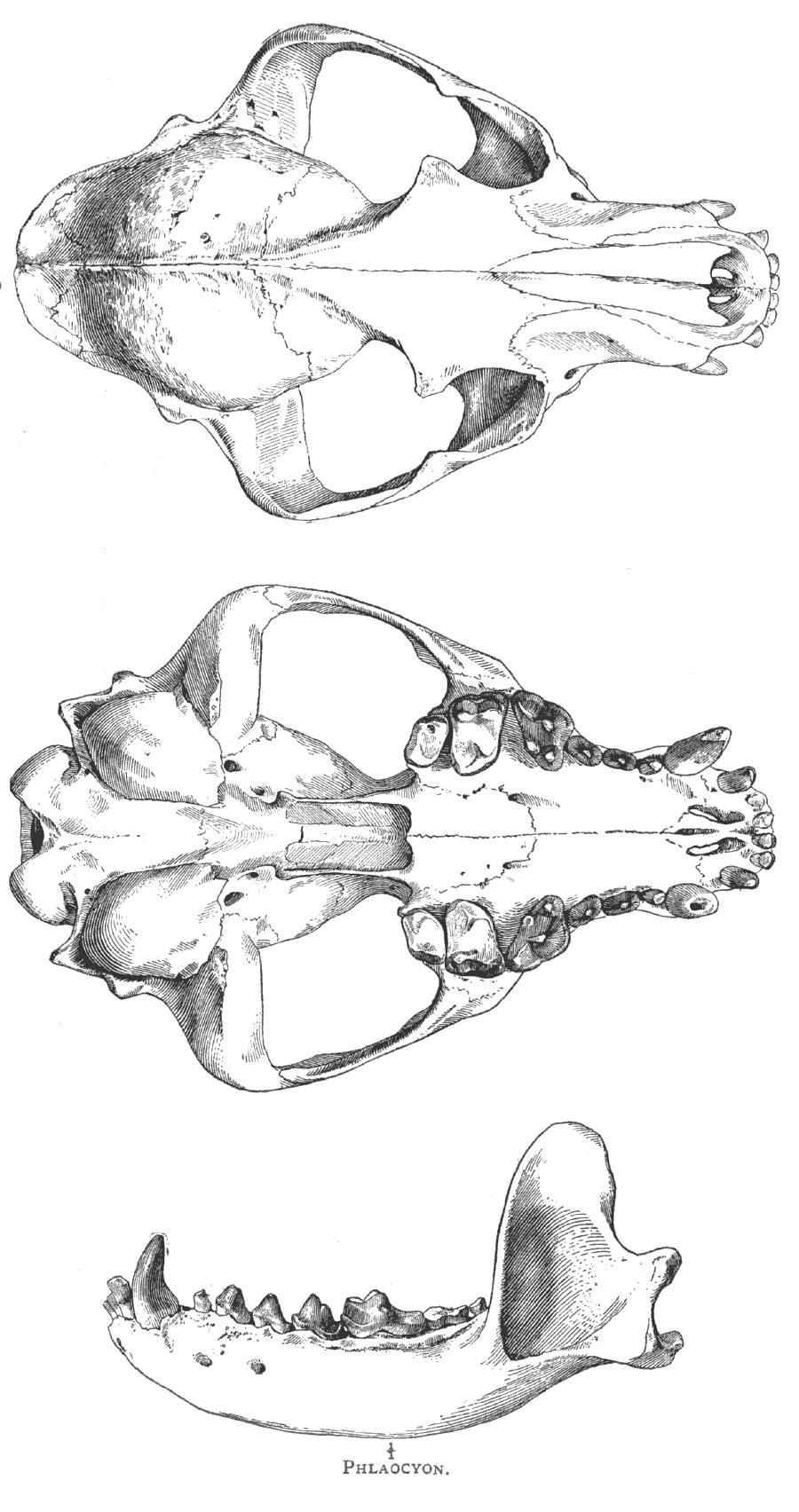
- Type specimen of Phlaocyon leucosteus

Scientific classification
- Domain: Eukaryota
- Kingdom: Animalia
- Phylum: Chordata
- Class: Mammalia
- Order: Carnivora
- Family: Canidae
- Subfamily: †Borophaginae
- Tribe: †Phlaocyonini; Wang, Tedford, & Taylor, 1999

Genera
- Cynarctoides; Phlaocyon
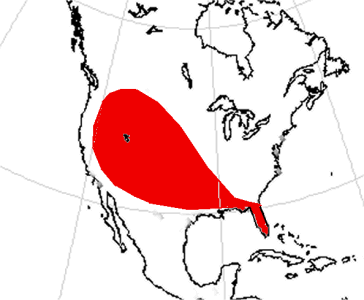
- Broad range of the clade Phlaocyonini based on fossil record

= Phlaocyonini =

Phlaocyonins Temporal range: Oligocene to Miocene

Extinct tribe of carnivores

Phlaocyonini is an extinct clade or tribe of hypocarnivorous borophagines (bone-crushing dogs). They were endemic to North America and from the Oligocene epoch (Whitneyan stage) to the Miocene (Early Barstovian) living ~33.3–5.3 Ma, existing for approximately 28 million years.

The clade includes Cynarctoides and Phlaocyon. These two genus members represent differing approaches of hypocarnivory. The Cynarctoides trend toward having molar teeth with crowns formed of crescent-shaped cusps and remain small in size. Phlaocyon specialize toward rounded cusps on the molar teeth but of increasing size, with an unusual trend toward being hypercarnivores by two terminal species in the clade.

Four transitional species of Cormocyon and Desmocyon occupy intermediate positions between the Phlaocyonini and Cynarctina. These represent a gradual size increase toward medium-size individuals.

== Fossil distribution ==
A few of many sites:

- Wewela Site, Turtle Butte Formation, Tripp County, South Dakota (Phlaocyon minor) ~30.8–20.6 Ma.
- Brooksville 2 Site, Hernando County, Florida (Phlaocyon taylori) ~26.3–24.8 Ma.
- Split Rock Site, Arikaree Formation, Fremont County, Wyoming, (Cynarctoides) ~20.6–16.3 Ma.
- Cedar Run Site, Oakville Formation, Washington County, Texas (Phlaocyon) ~20.3–5.3 Ma.
- Nambe Site, Tesuque Formation, Santa Fe County, New Mexico, (Cynarctoides acridens) ~20.3–5.3 Ma.
