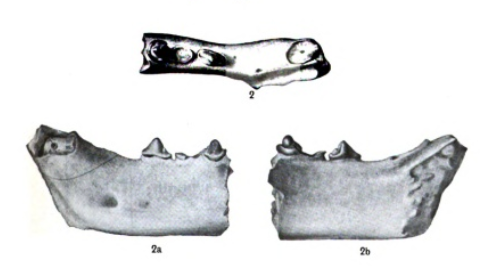
- The holotype of Sivasmilus copei as depicted by Pilgrim (1915).

Scientific classification
- Kingdom: Animalia
- Phylum: Chordata
- Class: Mammalia
- Order: Carnivora
- Family: Felidae
- Subfamily: †Machairodontinae
- Genus: †Sivasmilus; Kretzoi, 1929

Type species
- †Sivasmilus copei Kretzoi, 1929
- Map showing the location of the Chinji locality in Punjab, Pakistan.

= Sivasmilus =

Sivasmilus Temporal range: Miocene (14.1-11.4 Mya)

Extinct genus of saber-toothed cat from South Asia

Sivasmilus is a fossil genus of machairodontine (saber-toothed cat) from the Early or Middle Miocene of Pakistan. It contains one species, Sivasmilus copei, which is known from a single fossil, a partial lower jawbone, that was collected from the Chinji Formation in the Lower Siwaliks. The fossil was originally described in 1915 by British paleontologist G. E. Pilgrim, who assigned it to the prehistoric feline species Sivaelurus chinjiensis. It was subsequently used as the basis of a new genus and species in 1929 by Miklós Kretzoi. Sivasmilus copei was a medium-sized, cat-like animal that weighed between 30 and 50 kilograms (66 and 110 lb) and lived in a swampy forest environment.

== History and naming ==
The holotype and only specimen assigned to Sivasmilus, a partial left mandible labelled GSI-D 151, was collected from the Chinji type locality in the Salt Range of the Siwaliks. The similarly sized holotype of Sivaelurus chinjiensis was also found at this site, which led paleontologist Guy Ellcock Pilgrim to provisionally assign GSI-D 151 to S. chinjiensis when he described the fossil in 1915.

In 1929, American paleontologist William Diller Matthew considered the holotype of Sivaelurus to be distinctly feline, but the mandible fragment GSI-D 151 to be distinctly machaerodont (saber-toothed cat) based on features of the teeth. Hungarian paleontologist Miklós Kretzoi reached a similar conclusion that same year in a wholly separate paper and erected the new genus and species Sivasmilus copei for it; no etymology was given for either name. In his 1932 paper on Siwalik carnivorans, Pilgrim acknowledged this reassignment and agreed with its machaerodont affinities, stating that he had sought to avoid establishing an ill-defined genus when he assigned it to Sivaelurus.

In 2018, a paper by European paleontologists including Louis de Bonis and Stéphane Peigné describing the new genus Tchadailurus reviewed numerous other felid fossils for comparison, including Pilgrim's 1915 description of GSI-D 151. They noted that the mandible fragment seemed to fit the holotype of Sivaelurus (a near-complete right maxilla, or upper jaw bone) quite well. A 2025 book by geologist John C. Barry about the Siwalik fossil record discussed S. copei and mentioned another mandible in the collections of the Geological Survey of Pakistan that might also belong to Sivasmilus.

A 2025 study by Indian and Pakistani paleontologists describing Siwalik carnivoran fossils discussed the taxonomic history of GSI-D 151 in detail, then compared its mandibular flange to that of various machairodontines. They concluded that GSI-D 151 did not represent a Pseudaelurus-grade felid and was likely a distinct taxon, but that its broken teeth precluded any classification more specific than "Smilodontini indeterminate" based on the pictures and description provided by Pilgrim's 1915 paper and a 2021 study.

== Description ==
The holotype of Sivasmilus copei is a partial left mandibular ramus with the canine tooth and second, third, and fourth premolars. The mandible overall is small and relatively slender, with a moderately developed mental crest, and two mental foramina situated under the second and third premolars respectively. The ramus is broken off after the fourth premolar and any further teeth are unknown; additionally, the front part of the fourth premolar is broken off just above the root. It was noted by several authors that the chin formed a more obtuse angle with the lower edge of the ramus than was usual in "machaerodonts" (which at the time included the nimravids and barbourofelids).

The canine tooth is relatively large and somewhat elongated, situated above the level of the premolars, with an oval cross-section and missing or vestigial keels. The diastema between the canine and the third premolar is relatively long, with a vestigial second premolar (a primitive trait) situated at about the halfway point. The third premolar itself was small, low-crowned, with only a weak posterior (rear) accessory cusp and encircling cingulum (a shelf at the base of the tooth), and no anterior (front) accessory cusp or parastyle at all. The front edge of the third premolar, however, had a distinct series of very fine serrations. The fourth premolar was a longer tooth, with a large posterior accessory cusp and a broader cingulum than in the third premolar, a strong metastyle behind the principal cusp and room for a parastyle in front of the principal cusp, though Pilgrim could not say if a parastyle was present or not.

Kretzoi thought that Sivasmilus was situated evolutionarily between Afrosmilus africanus and Propontosmilus sivalensis [=Paramachaerodus orientalis]. Pilgrim, reviewing it in 1932, described it as a small and primitive species of machairodontine. The 2025 book of Siwalik fossils summarized it as relatively small, with an estimated weight of 30–50 kilograms (66–110 lb) based comparisons to extant related species.

The book also briefly described another specimen, in the collections of the Geological Survey of Pakistan, a mandible with a broken canine showing a distinct posterior crest, a completely absent second premolar, a two-rooted third premolar, and a pronounced blade-like anterior accessory cusp on the fourth premolar. It suggested but did not outright assign this specimen to Sivasmilus copei.

== Classification ==
When Kretzoi named Sivasmilus copei as a new taxon in 1929, he placed it in the subfamily Nimravinae of the family Nimravidae. When Pilgrim wrote his review in 1932, however, he assigned it to the subfamily Machairodontinae in the cat family Felidae. A 2021 study referred it without explanation to the Barbourofelinae. This was followed by two other papers in 2022 and 2023, though the latter study mentioned in passing that it bore a greater resemblance to machairodontines but that an inspection of the known material was needed. The 2025 book placed it back in Machairodontinae, while the 2025 study assigned GSI-D 151 to Smilodontini as a distinct but indeterminate taxon.

== Paleoecology ==
Sivasmilus copei is estimated to have lived 14.1–11.4 million years ago, during the Miocene. The presence of multiple species of the mouse-deer Dorcatherium from the same locality indicates the environment of the time was a humid, swampy forest with a dense understory.
