= Baranomys kowalskii =

Scientific classification
- Kingdom: Animalia
- Phylum: Chordata
- Class: Mammalia
- Order: Rodentia
- Family: Cricetidae
- Genus: †Baranomys
- Species: †B. kowalskii

Binomial name
- †Baranomys kowalskii Kretzoi, 1959

Species of mammal

Baranomys kowalskii is extinct species of rodent, from the Baranomys genus of the Baranomyinae subfamily of the Cricetidae family. It lived in Europe during the Pliocene epoch, 15 million years BCE, being one of the oldest known members of Baranomys family. It was an ancestor of modern Arvicolinae. The animal was described by Miklós Kretzoi in 1959, who based his research on the fossils found near the village in Podlesice in Silesian Voivodeship, Poland. It was named after a paleontologist and zoologist Kazimierz Kowalski.
