= Baranomys loczyi =

Scientific classification
- Kingdom: Animalia
- Phylum: Chordata
- Class: Mammalia
- Order: Rodentia
- Family: Cricetidae
- Genus: †Baranomys
- Species: †B. loczyi

Binomial name
- †Baranomys loczyi Kormos, 1933

Extinct species of rodent

Baranomys loczyi is an extinct species of rodent from the Baranomys genus, from the Baranomyinae subfamily of Cricetidae family. It lived in Pliocene epoch and was an ancestor to modern Arvicolinae. The species was first described by Theodor Kormos in 1933.
