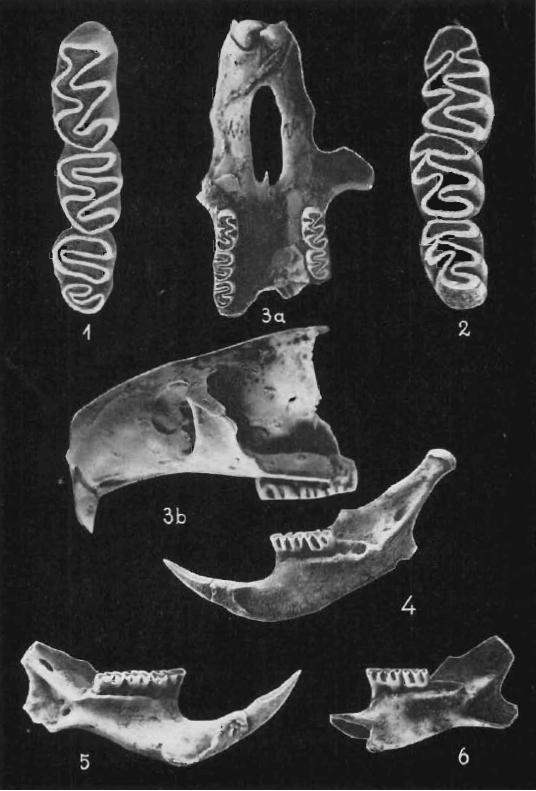
- Fossils of Baranomys longidens.

Scientific classification
- Kingdom: Animalia
- Phylum: Chordata
- Class: Mammalia
- Order: Rodentia
- Family: Cricetidae
- Subfamily: †Baranomyinae
- Genus: †Baranomys; Kormos, 1933

= Baranomys =

Extinct genus of rodent

Baranomys is an extinct genus of rodent from the Baranomyinae subfamily of Cricetidae family. It lived in the Pliocene epoch, and its fossils have been found in Canada, Germany, Hungary, Slovakia, and Poland. It was an ancestor to modern Arvicolinae. The species was described for the first time by Theodor Kormos in 1933.

== Species ==
- Baranomys kowalskii Kretzoi, 1962
- Baranomys langenhani Heller, 1937
- Baranomys loczyi Kormos, 1933
- Baranomys longidens Kowalski, 1960
