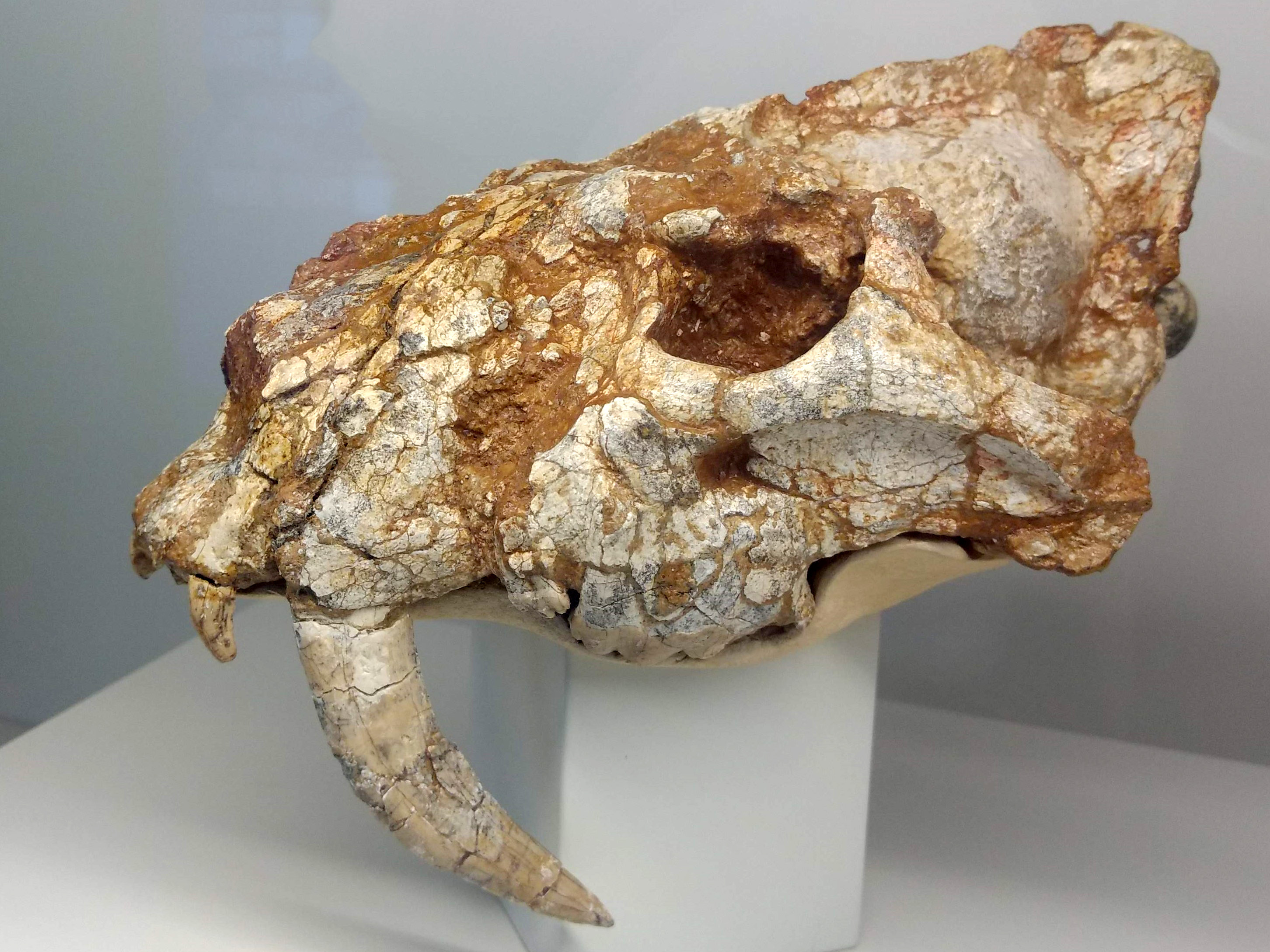
- Cranium of Albanosmilus jourdani

Scientific classification
- Kingdom: Animalia
- Phylum: Chordata
- Class: Mammalia
- Order: Carnivora
- Family: †Nimravidae
- Tribe: †Barbourofelini
- Genus: †Albanosmilus; Kretzoi, 1929

Type species
- Albanosmilus jourdani (Filhol, 1883)

Other Species
- Albanosmilus whitfordi (Barbour & Cook, 1915)

Synonyms
- A. jourdani: Albanosmilus vallesiensis; Barbourofelis vallesiensis; Sansanosmilus jourdani; A. whitfordi: Barbourofelis whitfordi

= Albanosmilus =

Albanosmilus Temporal range: Middle-Late Miocene (Serravallian to Messinian), 12–7 Ma

Extinct genus of carnivores

Albanosmilus is an extinct genus of the subfamily Barbourofelinae, part of the family of feliforms known as Nimravidae. The genus currently consists of two named species: Albanosmilus jourdani and Albanosmilus whitfordi. Albanosmilus lived in Eurasia and North America from the Middle to Late Miocene from 12 to 7 mya, making it one of the last nimravids. By the late Middle Miocene, A. jourdani replaced Sansanosmilus in Europe, additionally the genus may have been ancestral to Barbourofelis.

A. jourdani was found in Eurasia and was the largest species of the genus. With estimates suggesting it could've weighed 80–100 kg (180–220 lb), making it as large as a jaguar and smaller than Barbourofelis. Like Barbourofelis, A. jourdani was believed to have been an ambulatory, ambush predator and was likely an apex predator of its ecosystem. A. whitfordi was endemic to North America and was smaller in size, more similar in size a leopard. Unlike A. jourdani, A. whitfordi was believed to have been a cursorial predator. In addition, Albanosmilus was also recovered in East Asia. The extinction of Albanosmilus was due to the inability to adapt to more open environments, as well as the decline of its potential prey.

== Taxonomy ==
=== Classification ===
Bryant in his 1991 considered Albanosmilus as a member of the false sabre-toothed cat family Nimravidae. However, Albanosmilus was eventually considered part of the Barbourofelidae, where it was considered synonymous to Sansanosmilus. By 2013, this was refuted as the authors argued it had features that differed from Sansanosmilus such as larger size, more reduced p3, and displaying a double fused or single root. It also had features differed from Barbourofelis including the presence of a mesial cingulum cusp in P3 and lack of metaconid in m1. In the addition, the authors also moved Barbourofelis whitfordi to the genus Albanosmilus.

In the 2020s, majority of experts reclassified barbourofelids as nimravids, either as a subfamily known as Barbourofelinae, or within the subfamily Nimravinae.

=== Evolution ===
Nimravids were a group of saber-tooth predators, which is an ecomorph consisting of various groups of extinct predatory synapsids (mammals and close relatives), which convergently evolved extremely long maxillary canines, as well as adaptations to the skull and skeleton related to their use. Other than nimravids, this includes members of Gorgonopsia, Thylacosmilidae, Machaeroidinae, and Machairodontinae. The earliest known nimravid fossil was found in the Lushi and Dongjun formations of China, which dated to the middle Eocene. The oldest named nimravid was Maofelis of the middle of the Eocene epoch, about 41.03 Ma. The diversification of nimravids was thought to have been the result of the decline of oxyaenids, which opened up the niche of cat-like predators. They reached their peak diversity in the Early Oligocene, consisting of 13 contemporary species, mainly from hoplophonines. However, over the course of the Oligocene, nimravids would experience a decline because of an increase of open environments, in the case of North American nimravids, competition with amphicyonids.

Barbourofelines likely evolved when nimravines dispersed into Africa during the MN2 stage, with the earliest babrourofelines being small scimitar-toothed predators. Their size was likely constrained due to the diversity of hyaenodonts that roamed continent. Despite this, they were still able to carve a niche due to their derived dental morphology. Eventually they would disperse into Eurasia and North America, showing an increase in body size and degree of sabertooth morphology. During the late Middle Miocene, A. jourdani replaced Sansanosmilus in Europe. It was thought that A. jourdani migrated into North America, evolving into the genus Barbourofelis and the species A. whitfordi. The diversification of barbourofelines, canines, and felines, may have placed a role in the extinction of borophagines.

== Description ==
Albanosmilus jourdani is estimated to have weighed around 80–100 kg (180–220 lb), one study suggested this species could've even exceeded 100 kg (220 lb). Making it one of the largest nimravids, just behind Barbourofelis, Dinailurictis, Eusmilus adelos, and Quercylurus. A. whitfordi was considered to be similar in size to B. morrisi, which was as large as a leopard. A 2024 study found based on m1 regressions estimated that A. whitfordi could've weighed 72.8 kg (160 lb). ^{Including supplementary materials}

== Paleobiology and paleoecology ==
=== Predatory behavior ===
Albanosmilus is speculated to either have been a pack or solitary hunter. A 2020 study estimated that A. jourdani had a jaw gape of 90°. ^{Including supplementary materials} Coprolites likely referable to this genus were described in 2023, which may suggest that Albanosmilus was an apex predator in this locality. Presumably, like other carnivorans that weighed over 25 kg (55 lb), it probably hunted herbivores its size or larger. Due to the lack of bone fragments, it's suggested that the diet of Albanosmilus largely consisted of meat, which is consistent with its hypercarnviorous dentition and presumed nutrients. While A. jourdani was recovered as an ambush, ambulatory predator, A. whitfordi has been recovered as a cursorial predator based on elbow morphology.

=== Ecology ===
Albanosmilus jourdani was found in Eurasia, and lived from 11.9-9.6 Ma. ^{Including supplementary materials} This species was found in Gratkorn, it coexisted with herbivores such as would include equid Anchitherium, suids such as Parachleuastochoerus steinheimensis and listriodontinae Listriodon splendens, palaeomerycidae Palaeomeryx, chalicotheriidae Chalicotherium, aceratheriinae rhinos Aceratherium, Brachypotherium and Lartetotherium, and deinotheriinae proboscidean Deinotherium. The contemporary carnivoran within this locality was the hyena Protictitherium, both carnivores would've coexisted by hunting prey of different sizes. Based on the coprolites, equid, suids, and palaeomerycids were probable prey for Albanosmilus. While on the other hand, chalicotheres, rhinos, and proboscideans were would've been improbable prey, with social hunting comparable to lion prides being required to hunt young proboscideans. On the other hand, there is possible evidence of Albanosmilus scavenging on Deinotherium.

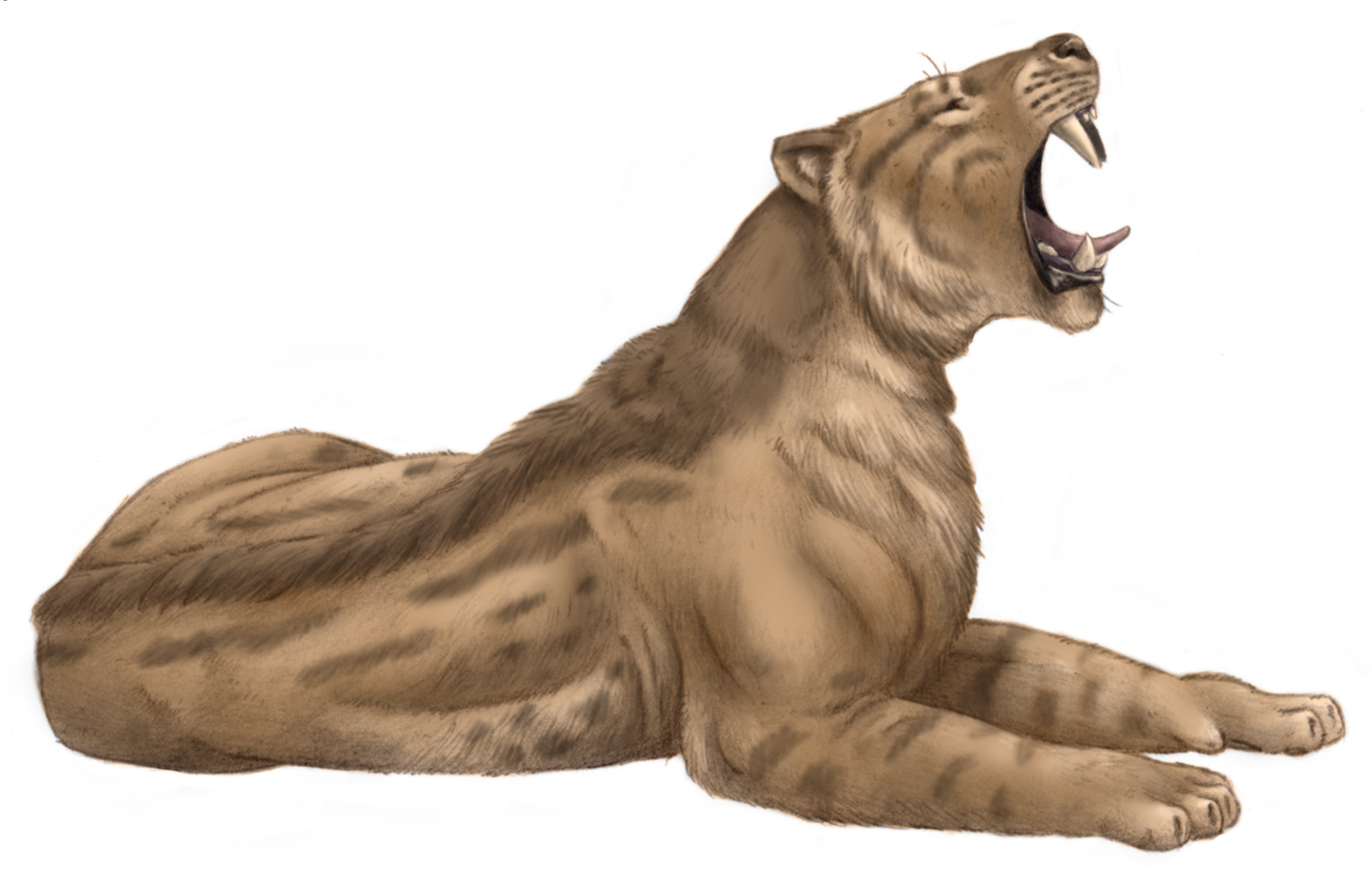
Life reconstruction of Machairodus, a machairodont that coexisted with Albanosmilus across Eurasia.

Within Los Valles de Fuentidueña, A. jourdani coexisted with carnivorans including felids such as the basal Pseudaelurus quadridentatus and machairodont Machairodus aphanistus, amphicyoninae Magericyon castellanus, and ictitheriinae hyena Lycyaena chaeretis. Herbivores within this locality include hipparionini equid Hippotherium primigenium, aceratheriinae rhinos Aceratherium incisivum and Alicornops simorrense, bovid Miotragocerus, cervid Euprox dicranocerus, tragulid Dorcatherium naui, giraffid Decennatherium pachecoi, and "tetralophodont gomphothere" Tetralophodon longirostris. Isotopic analysis shows Albanosmilus hunted in woodland to mesic grasslands and preyed upon Hippotherium, Miotragocerus, Euprox, Dorcatherium, and Chalicomys. Miotragocerus was found to make the greatest contribution to its diet while Dorcatherium was the least contributor. They also found that the megaherbivores were unlikely to have been frequent prey items by any of the carnivorans. The isotopic values also showed that there was a significant niche overlap between large predators within LVF, which strongly suggests resource competition, this is further supported by the density of large predators and low density of small and medium herbivores. ^{Including supplementary materials}

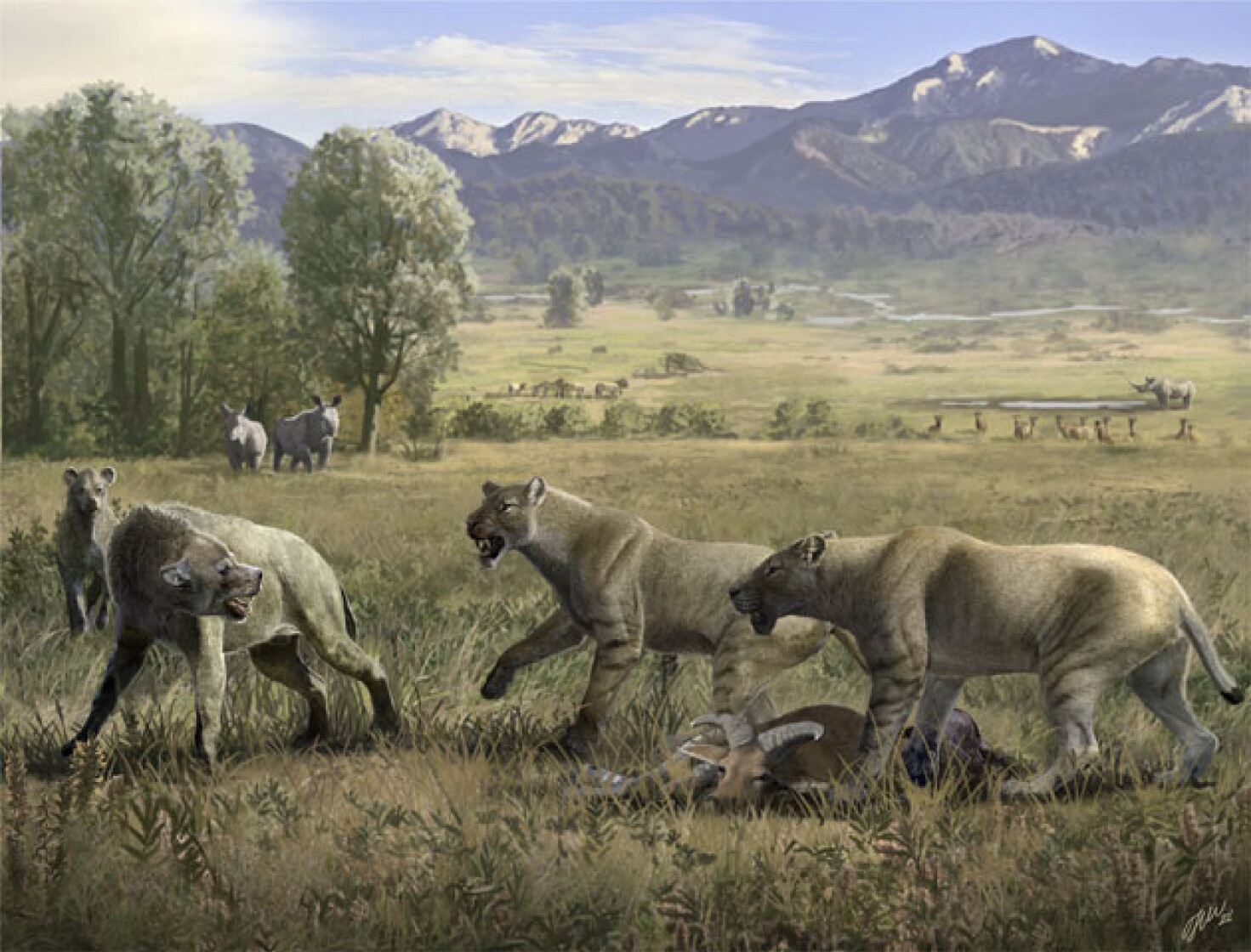
Life restoration of Amphimachairodus hezhengensis and Dinocrocuta gigantea, two large carnivorans present within the Dashengou Fauna

Within the Dashengou Fauna of the Linxia Basin, Albanosmilus coexisted with a number of large carnivorans such as the large percrocutid hyena Dinocrocuta gigantea, machairodonts Amphimachairodus hezhengensis and Machairodus aphanistus, and two unnamed agriotheriini bears. Other carnivorans known from the area include skunks, mustelids, and four species of small to medium-sized hyenas. Dinocrocuta was the most abundant carnivore found within this fauna found to be the most common carnivoran within this fauna and was likely a top predator within the fauna. Albanosmilus was rather rare, making up 6.2% of the carnivorans present. Herbivores within this fauna include rhinoceros such as Acerorhinus hezhengensis, Chilotherium wimani, and Iranotherium morgani, suid Chleuastochoerus stehlini, cervid Dicrocerus, bovid Miotragocerus, giraffids Honanotherium schlosseri and Samotherium, and proboscidean Tetralophodon exoletus. Due to the abundance of hypercarnivorous cursorial and non-cursorial terrestrial predators, suggests that the Linxia Basin environment was always relatively open likely the result of the uplifting of the Tibetan Plateau.

== Extinction ==
Albanosmilus jourdani disappeared from the Iberian Peninsula around 9.6 Ma. Within the Linxia Basin, Albanosmilus went extinct 8.5 Ma, and in North America, A. whitfordi went extinct around 7 Ma. Some have hypothesized that the extinction of barbourofelines, such as Albanosmilus, was due to competition with sabertooth cats such as Machairodus and Nimravides. However, this hypothesis has been questioned as their temporal overlap was limited. In addition, Albanosmilus was able to successfully coexist with both Amphimachairodus and Machairodus within Linxia Basin and Los Valles de Fuentidueña.

Other experts argued changes within the ecosystems was the likely cause of its extinction. The disappearance of Albanosmilus in the Iberian Peninsula was contemporary with Vallesian-Turolian turnover event, also known as the Vallesian Crisis, which saw high extinction rates along with high levels of appearances. The Vallesian Crisis saw an increase of precipitation of seasonality, which gave way for drier, more open environments. The disappearance of Albanosmilus within the Iberian Peninsula suggests it wasn’t adapted to the drier, open environments. In North America, barbourofelines went extinct because of the faunal turnover at the end of Hh2, which saw a decline in potential prey such as horses, camelids, antilocaprids, and dromomerycids.
