= Michael Morlo =

German palaeontologist

- Born: Michael Morlo
- Known for: Hyaenodontology
- Scientific career
- Fields: Palaeontology

Michael Morlo is a German palaeontologist best known for his study of hyaenodonts and their evolution and ecology.

== Career ==
Morlo earned his PhD in 1994 from the Department of Geology at Johannes-Gutenberg-Universität Mainz. From 1995 to 1999, he was a postdoctoral fellow at the Senckenberg Institute. Since 2000, he has held the title of Honorary Research Associate at Senckenberg.

Below is a list of taxa that Morlo has contributed to naming:

Year	Taxon	Authors
2021	Cynohyaenodon smithae sp. nov.	Solé, Morlo, Schaal, & Lehmann
2021	Eurotherium mapplethorpei sp. nov.	Solé, Morlo, Schaal, & Lehmann
2021	Lesmesodon gunnelli sp. nov.	Solé, Morlo, Schaal, & Lehmann
2015	Kerberos langebadreae gen. et sp. nov.	Solé, Amson, Borths, Vidalenc, Morlo, & Bastl
2014	Sinopa jilinia sp. nov.	Morlo, Bastl, Wenhao, & Schaal
2012	Apterodon langebadreae sp. nov.	Grohé, Morlo, Chaimanee, Blondel, Coster, Valentin, Salem, Bilal, Jaeger, & Brunet
2004	Prosansanosmilus eggeri sp. nov.	Morlo, Peigné, & Nagel
