= Baranomys langenhani =

Scientific classification
- Kingdom: Animalia
- Phylum: Chordata
- Class: Mammalia
- Order: Rodentia
- Family: Cricetidae
- Genus: †Baranomys
- Species: †B. langenhani

Binomial name
- †Baranomys langenhani Heller, 1937

Extinct species of rodent

Baranomys langenhani is an extinct species of rodent from the Baranomys genus, from the Baranomyinae subfamily of the Cricetidae family. It lived in Pliocene epoch and was an ancestor to modern Arvicolinae. The species was first described by Florian Heller in 1937.
