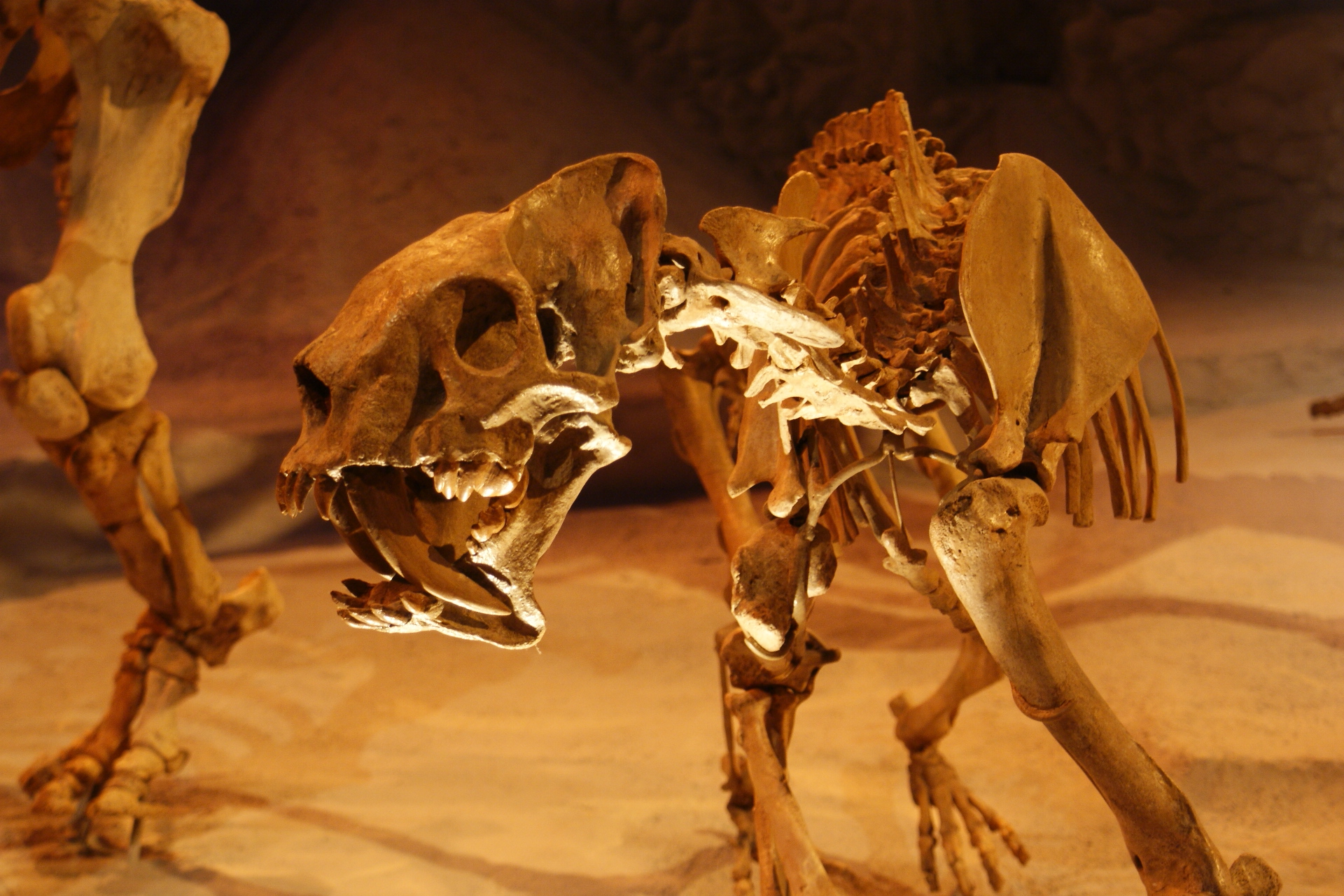
- B. loveorum, Florida Museum of Natural History Fossil Hall at the University of Florida

Scientific classification
- Kingdom: Animalia
- Phylum: Chordata
- Class: Mammalia
- Order: Carnivora
- Family: †Nimravidae
- Tribe: †Barbourofelini
- Genus: †Barbourofelis; Schultz, Schultz & Martin, 1970

Type species
- †Barbourofelis fricki Schultz, Schultz & Martin, 1970

Other Species
- †Barbourofelis loveorum; †Barbourofelis morrisi; †Barbourofelis oregonensis; †Barbourofelis piveteaui

= Barbourofelis =

Barbourofelis Temporal range: Middle to Late Miocene (Serravallian to Messinian), 12–7 Ma

Extinct genus of carnivores

Barbourofelis is an extinct genus of large feliform, from the subfamily Barbourofelinae, which is part of the family of false-sabertooth cats known as Nimravidae. Barbourofelis, along with Albanosmilus, were the last known nimravids. Barbourofelis lived in North America and Eurasia during the Miocene epoch from 12 to 7 Ma.

Five species are currently recognized within the genus: B. fricki, B. loveorum, B. morrisi, B. oregonensis, and B. piveteaui. B. morrisi likely evolved from Albanosmilus migrating into North America. With B. piveteaui evolving from reverse migration from North America into Eurasia. B. loveorum possibly evolved from B. morrisi, and may have evolved into B. fricki.

B. morrisi and B. piveteaui were the smallest species being about as large as a leopard. B. loveorum was the larger than B. morrisi and may have weighed anywhere from 70–128 kg (154–282 lb). B. fricki was the most recent and largest species of the genus, as well as the largest nimravid. Suggested to have been as large as lions, weighing around 328 kg (723 lb), although a later study suggested it was significantly smaller weighing 256 kg (564 lb). B. oregonensis was described to being similar in size and morphology to B. fricki. It's believed that Barbourofelis was an ambulatory, ambush predator that hunted within closed forested environments. The extinction of Barbourofelis was thought to have been the result of the decline of its preferred prey.

== Taxonomy ==
=== Classification ===
Barbourofelis was named by Bertrand Schultz, Marian Schultz, and Larry Martin in 1970 in honor of Erwin Hinckley Barbour, who died a few days before the holotype was discovered. Its type species is Barbourofelis fricki and is the type genus of the subfamily Barbourofelinae. Originally, barbourofelids were considered members of the machairodont subfamily. However, this was called into question, and by the 1980s and 90s barbourofelids were considered to be nimravids instead of felids. In the 2000s, Morlo et al. (2004) argued that barbourofelids ranked as their own family, known as Barbourofelidae. This was also the prevailing view for barbourofelids during the 2010s, although some experts still considered them to be nimravids.

However, in the 2020s, most experts have reclassified them as nimravids. Most experts classify them as the subfamily Barbourofelinae, although one study proposed them as a tribe, Barbourofelini, within the Nimravinae subfamily.

=== Evolution ===
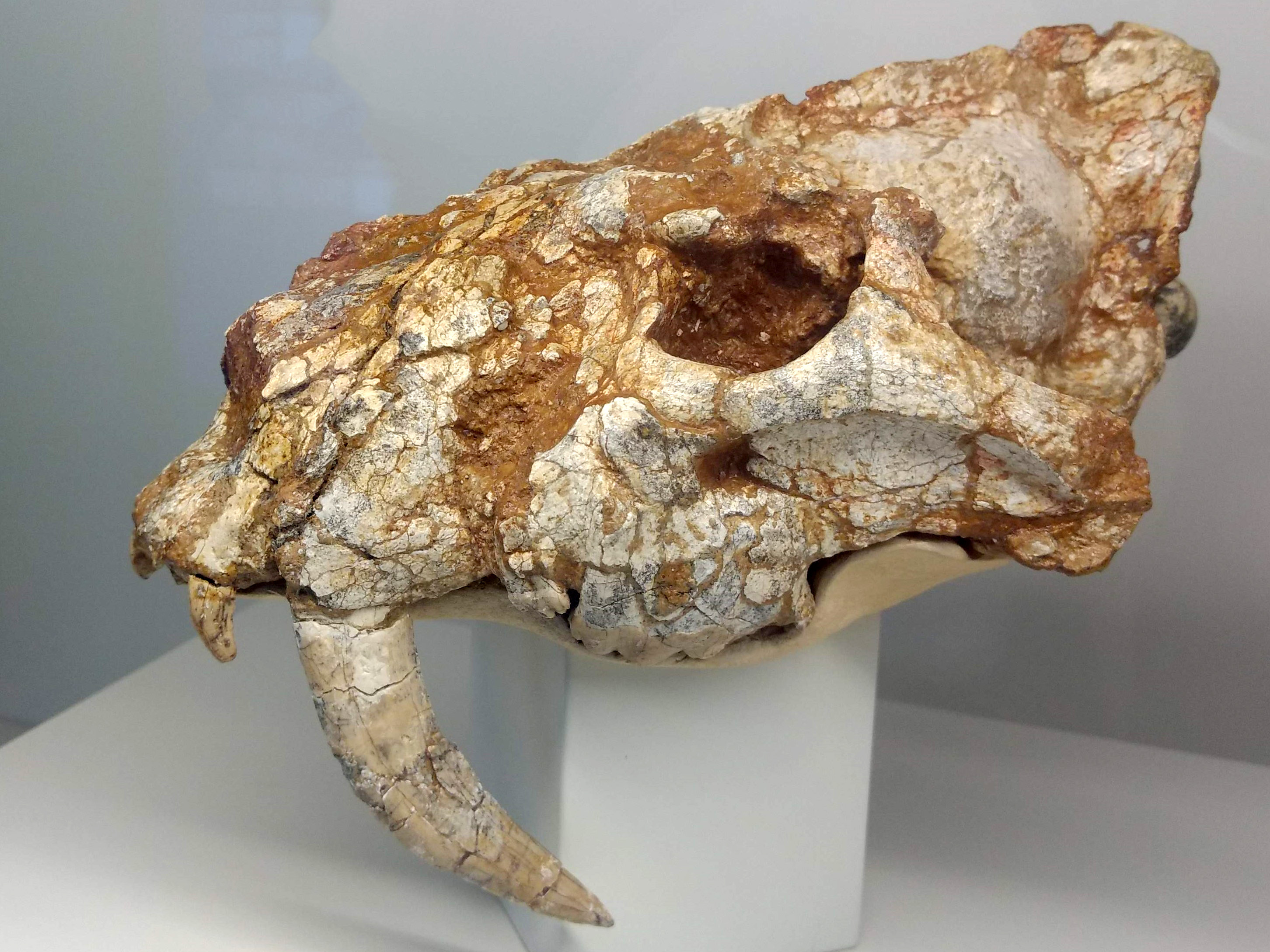
Cranium of Albanosmilus jourdani, the possible ancestor of Barbourofelis

Albanosmilus jourdani is believed to be the ancestor to the genus, which migrated into North America sometime during the Late Miocene. B. morrisi was the earliest species within the genus, probably the result of Albanosmilus migrating to North America and was likely ancestral to B. loveorum, which later evolved into B. fricki. The discovery of B. piveteau suggests Barbourofelis reverse migrated back into Eurasia.

== Description ==
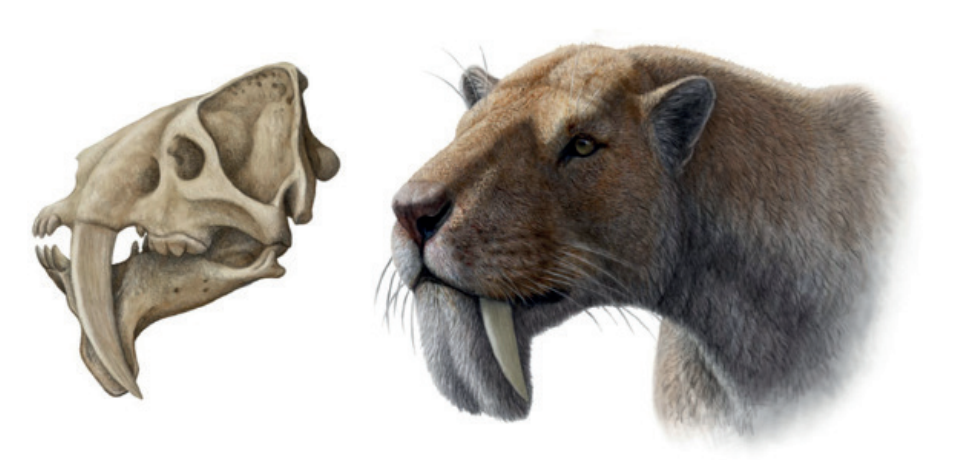
Restoration of the head of B. fricki by Mauricio Antón

The type species, B. fricki, is considered to have been the largest barbourofeline, as well as the largest nimravid. B. fricki was thought to have been a lion-sized predator, having a weight comparable to an African lion, with limb bones indicating a muscular, robust body. Individuals within the species have been reconstructed with shoulder heights of around 90 cm (2 ft 11 in). In 2021, Barret estimated based on m1 length regression, B. fricki may have weighed up to 328 kg (723 lb), however a 2024 study found a much lower body mass of 256 kg (564 lb). ^{Including supplementary materials} B. oregonensis was another large species, described to being similar in size and morphology to B. fricki, although it has some distinctions such as the absence of P4 and M1, as well as a more pronounced transverse.

The smaller species, B. morrisi, was believed to have been closer to the size of a large leopard and has a shoulder height around 65 cm (2 ft 2 in), being intermediate in size between Sansanosmilus and B. fricki. B. piveteaui is described to being similar in size to B. morrisi. B. loveorum was suggested to have been larger than B. morrisi. In a 2012 paper, Meachen estimated that B. loveorum may have weighed 70 kg (150 lb) on average. However, Orcutt and Calde estimated that based on articular width of the humerus, the species may have been larger, weighing between 87–128 kg (192–282 lb), with an average weight of 110 kg (240 lb).

The genus had the longest canines of all barbourofelines, which were also flattened, indicating a high degree of specialization to its diet. These canines had a longitudinal groove on the lateral surface that has been described as a means of allowing blood from a wound they have inflicted to flow away. This groove more likely was an adaptation to make the canines lighter while maintaining their strength. Other notable traits include the presence of a postorbital bar, the presence of a ventrally extended mental process (bony extensions on either side of the lower jaw), and the shortening of the skull behind the orbits, in addition to having a very robust constitution. The barbourofelin was probably very stocky in build, resembling a bear-like lion or lion-like bear. Based on its foot structure, species of Barbourofelis might have had a semi-plantigrade walking stance.

The most extensive selections of bones found for this genus come from B. loveorum and have allowed further inference to the proportions of other members of the genus.

== Paleobiology ==
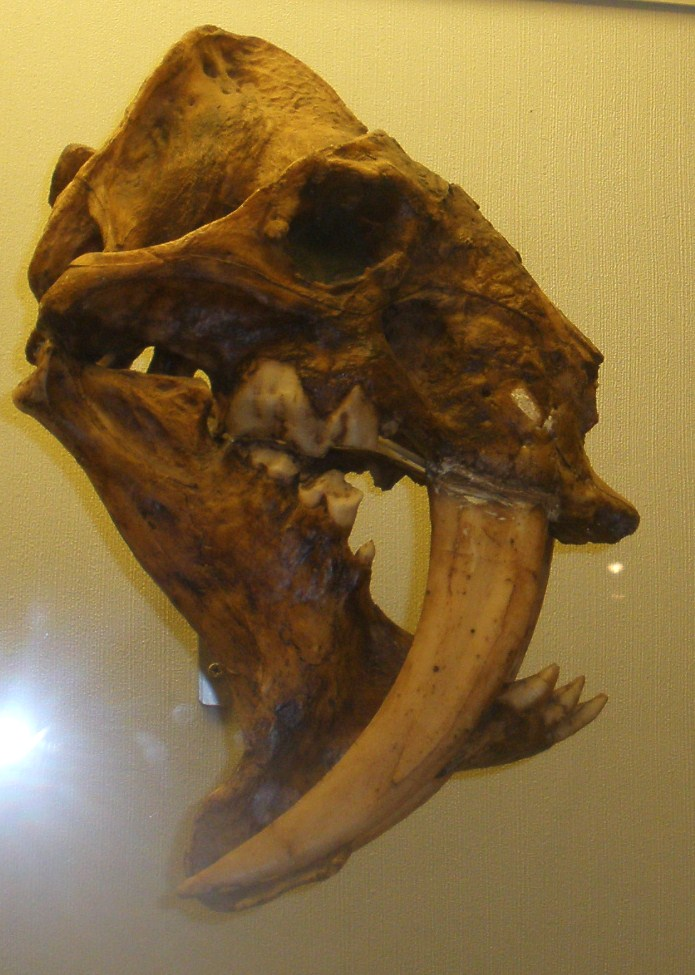
B. fricki skull

=== Growth and development ===
A 1988 study found that based on the analysis of the skulls and maxillary materials, Barbourofelis had delayed eruptions of deciduous upper canines, which suggests that Barbourofelis practiced a long period of parental care. Additionally, skeletons of juvenile Barbourofelis have been found, and examination of their skeletons indicates that the cubs would reach near-adult size before their milk sabers would begin to erupt. This indicates that they were dependent on their mother or potential family group until well into their second year, similar to that of modern lions. Such a long period of dependence would have likely led to situations in which near-adult cubs would have likely helped to restrain prey while their mother made the kill.

=== Social behavior ===
Barbourofelis was found to have large carnassial teeth, meant it was for efficiently processing a carcass and ate at a fast and competitive manner. This indicated it either lived in a highly competitive ecosystem or that it was social, or even a combination of both scenarios. In addition, experts argued due to the delayed eruption of their upper canines may have been further evidence of gregariousness in Barbourofelis. Although, some authors have suggested that Barbourofelis was a solitary ambush predator.

=== Predatory behavior ===
Forelimb analysis from a 2021 found that B. loveorum may have less constrained forelimb movement compared to the contemporary machairodont Nimravides galiani and extant felids. The increased mobility in the forelimbs suggests it relied on grappling prey and subduing prey, as an ambulatory ambush predator, that walked and trotted around the forest floor similar to ursids, wolverines, and badgers. It would've been opportunistic and attacked prey upon reach, and could've engaged in scavenging similar to wolverines due to their large carnassial teeth. In addition to possibly being able to climb, although it wouldn't have been arboreal. A 2005 study found that the leopard-sized B. morrisi had a similar crural index to the lion-sized Smilodon fatalis, but had a lower brachial index than the machairodont and ambush predators, having an index score closer to that of ambulators. This suggests B. morrisi had the same leverage as Smilodon. In addition, B. loveroum and B. fricki were found to have even lower brachial and crural indexes than Smilodon, suggesting that barbourofelins possibly had a greater power output of the limbs than Smilodon. The robustness of the humerus suggests it could've taken on prey larger than itself.

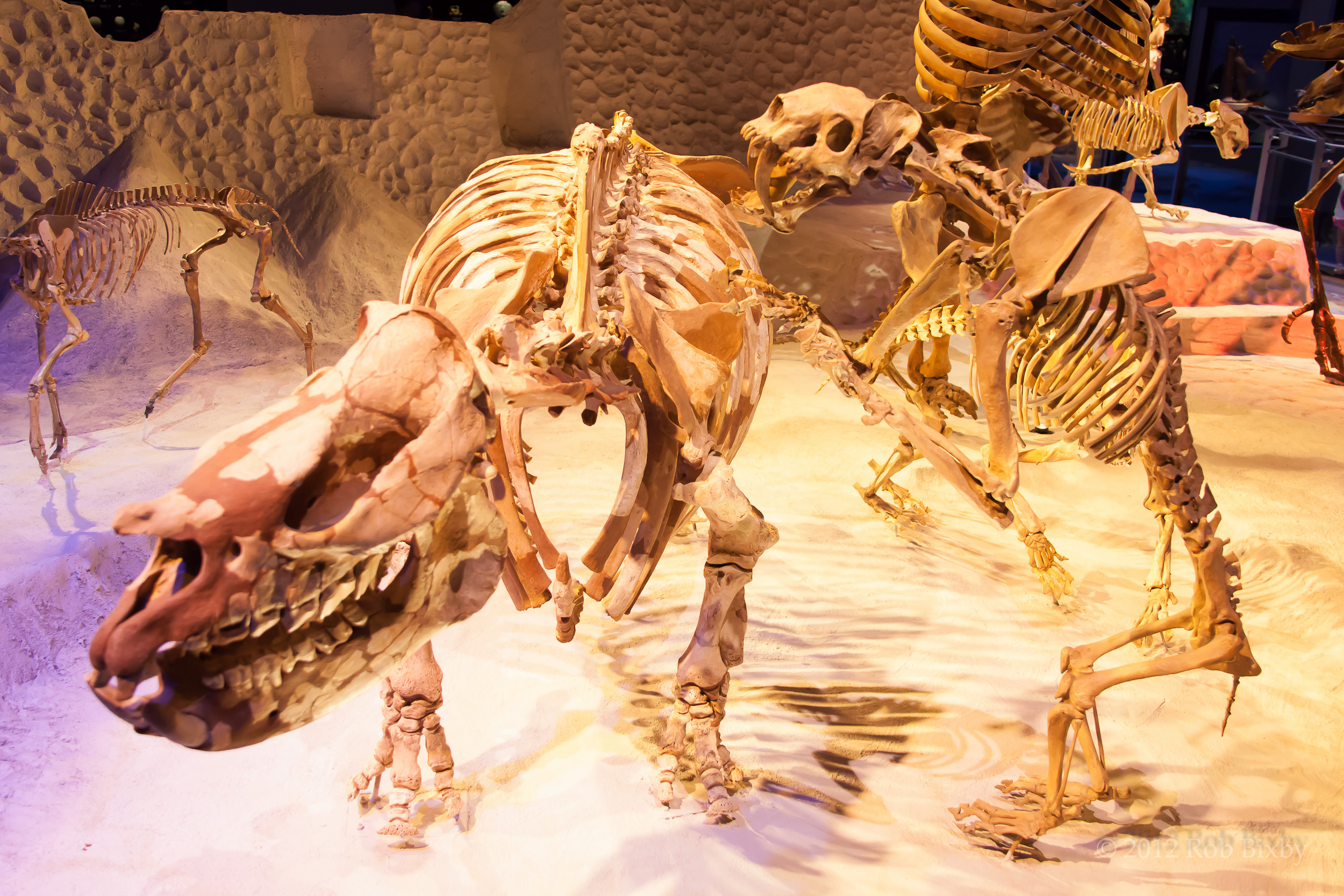
B. loveorum mounted as it attacks Teleoceras

Previously, it has been suggested by Naples and Martin that B. fricki had a jaw gape of 115° or greater. However, Lautenschlager et al. (2020) suggests a lower jaw gape for Barbourofelis. Their analysis suggests jaw gapes of 89.13°, 85.29°, and 65.68° for B. fricki, B. loveorum, and B. morrisi respectively. ^{Including supplementary materials}

Figueirido et al. (2024) study on the cranial biomechanics of B. fricki found based on m. masseter pars profunda, this species would've had a maximum jaw gape of 73° and found little evidence to support jaw gapes of over 90°. They also found that Barbourofelis skull was less stressed when it came to bilateral canine biting compared to Smilodon fatalis. When it came to stabbing, the skull of Barbourofelis were not as evenly distributed as Smilodon, with regional stresses mainly present in occipital and parietal bones, as well as the upper canines. With pulling-back, stress in Smilodon skull was more evenly distributed than Barbourofelis, with the stress of Barbourofelis being concentrated in the premaxilla, parietal-occipital region, postorbital bar, and canines. Despite having a stress resistant skull, the canines were found to be very weak when extrinsic forces are applied due to its sharp and flattened canines, so it would've been able to penetrate more easily than Smilodon. The authors argued, since Barbourofelis skull experiences less stress than Smilodon, it may have been more generalist in prey killing than Smilodon.

=== Brain anatomy ===
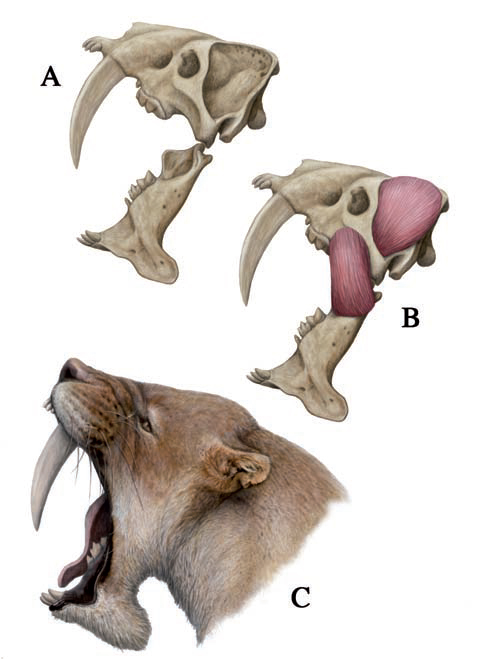
Reconstructions by Antón

Despite its derived craniodental adaptations, Barbourofelis brain was similar to that of Oligocene nimravids. Compared to living felids, its brain its anterior lobes were more narrow and the highest point of the cerebrum was situated more caudally.

== Paleoecology ==
B. loveorum's environment in the Love Bone Beds deposits (of Clarendonian Age) was a mixture of grassland, riverine forest, and marshes, in which it would have shared territory with herbivorous animals include rhinoceroses such as Teleoceras and Aphelops, the protoceratid Synthetoceras, the camel Aepycamelus, horses such as Neohipparion and Nannippus, the extinct tapir Tapirus webbi, the proboscidean Gomphotherium, and carnivores such as the machairodont Nimravides galiani, the borophaginae canid Epicyon, and mustelids such as Leptarctus and Sthenictis. Forelimb morphology suggests B. loveorum and N. galiani weren't directly competing with one another, but instead niche partitioned by preferring different habitats. The robust forelimbs of Barbourofelis suggests it preferred forested environments, while Nimravides preferred more open habitats. This is further supported by forest dwelling fauna such as tapirs, Prosthennops, Aepycamelus, and B. loveorum itself being unusually abundant in Love Bone Beds compared to Late Miocene sites. In addition, the shorter metacarpals of Barbourofelis suggested it hunted smaller prey than Nimravides.

B. fricki roamed western North America being found in states such as Kansas, Nebraska, Texas, and Nevada from 9 to 7 Ma. ^{Including supplementary materials} Within Ambelodon fricki Quarry of Nebraska, B. fricki coexisted with canids such as borophagines canids like Epicyon hayendi and Borophagus, and an extinct fox Vulpes stenognathus, the agriotherinii bear Indarctos oregonensis, the machairodont Nimravides, and mustelid Sthenictis. Large herbivores present included rhinoceros such as Aphelops and Teleoceras, horses such as Protohippus gidleyi, Calippus, Cormohipparion, Dinohippus leidyanus, and Neohipparion trampasense, and the proboscidean Amebelodon fricki.

=== Extinction ===
B. fricki, the last species of Barbourofelis, went extinct around 7 Ma. ^{Including supplementary materials} Some scientists thought its extinction may have been the result of competition with machairodonts such as Nimravides, as they were widely successful despite the expansion of grasslands. However, other experts have argued against competition playing a role in the extinction of Barbourofelis as the temporal overlap between barbourofelines and machairodonts were limited. Instead, they believe its extinction was the result of a faunal overturn at the end of Hh2, which saw a decline in horses, camelids, antilocaprids, and dromomerycids.
