= Microtodon =

Scientific classification
- Kingdom: Animalia
- Phylum: Chordata
- Class: Mammalia
- Order: Rodentia
- Family: Cricetidae
- Subfamily: †Baranomyinae
- Genus: †Microtodon; Miller, 1927

Extinct genus of rodent

Microtodon is an extinct genus of rodent, from the Baranomyinae subfamily of Cricetidae family. It lived in Pliocene epoch. It was described by Gerrit Smith Miller Jr. in 1927.

== Species ==
- Microtodon atavus (Shotwell, 1924)
- Microtodon mimus (Shotwell, 1956)
