= Ellesmereomys =

Ellesmereomys Temporal range: Pliocene

Scientific classification
- Kingdom: Animalia
- Phylum: Chordata
- Class: Mammalia
- Infraclass: Placentalia
- Order: Rodentia
- Family: Cricetidae
- Subfamily: †Baranomyinae
- Genus: Ellesmereomys; Martin & Zakrzewski, 2023
- Species: E. haringtoni

Binomial name
- Ellesmereomys haringtoni Martin & Zakrzewski, 2023

Extinct genus of rodent

Ellesmereomys is an extinct genus of baranomyine cricetid that inhabited Ellesmere Island during the Pliocene epoch. It is known from a single species, E. haringtoni.
