= Jinomrefu =

Scientific classification
- Kingdom: Animalia
- Phylum: Chordata
- Class: Mammalia
- Order: Carnivora
- Family: †Nimravidae
- Tribe: †Afrosmilini
- Genus: †Jinomrefu; Friscia, Macharwas, Muteti, Ndiritu & Rasmussen, 2020

Type species
- †Jinomrefu lakwanza Friscia, Macharwas, Muteti, Ndiritu & Rasmussen, 2020

Extinct genus of barbourofelid

Jinomrefu is a fossil genus of barbourofelin containing a single species Jinomrefu lakwanza. It was described in 2020 based on fossils from the Paleogene-Neogene boundary locality at Nakwai, Kenya.
