= Agenian =

Period of geologic time within the Miocene epoch

The Agenian age is a period of geologic time (23.8–20 Ma) within the Miocene used more specifically with European Land Mammal Ages. It follows the Orleanian age and overlaps the Aquitanian and Burdigalian ages.
