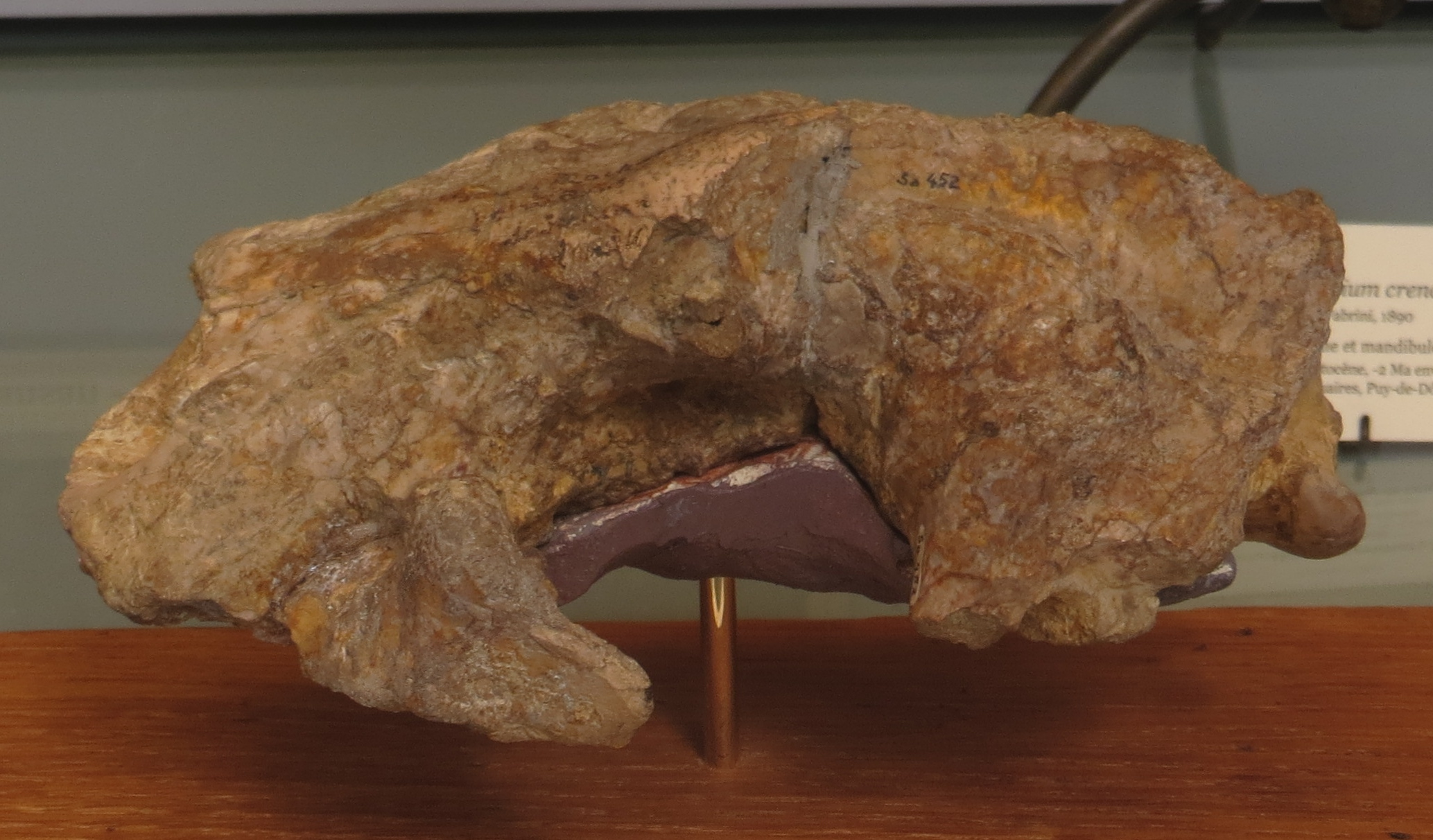
- Skull of S. palmidens

Scientific classification
- Kingdom: Animalia
- Phylum: Chordata
- Class: Mammalia
- Order: Carnivora
- Family: †Nimravidae
- Tribe: †Barbourofelini
- Genus: †Sansanosmilus; Kretzoi, 1929

Type species
- Sansanosmilus palmidens Kretzoi, 1929

Other Species
- Sansanosmilus rhomboidalis; Sansanosmilus serratus

= Sansanosmilus =

Sansanosmilus Temporal range: Middle-Late Miocene (Burdigalian to Tortonian), 16–11.4 Ma

Extinct genus of carnivores

Sansanosmilus is an extinct genus of carnivorous mammal of the subfamily Barbourofelinae, and was found in Eurasia and lived during the Miocene from 16 to 11.4 mya, existing for 4.6 million years. ^{Including supplementary materials}

== Taxonomy ==
Sansanosmilus is a member of the group of feiliforms known as barbourofelids, once considered to being a separate family of feliforms, now widely considered to be a subfamily of nimravids.

Although Albanosmilus was seen as a junior synonym of Sansanosmilus from the 1970s onwards, Robles et al. (2013) demonstrated that the type species of Albanosmilus, A. jourdani (which they considered to be a senior synonym of S. vallesiensis), is more closely related to Barbourofelis than to the type species of Sansanosmilus and thus generically distinct. Wang et al. (2020) agreed with Robles et al. (2013) in recovering Albanosmilus as closer to Barbourofelis than to Sansanosmilus.

A further two species of Sansanosmilus (S. rhomboidalis and S. serratus) were described by G.E. Pilgrim in 1932 based on fragmentary fossils from the Siwaliks. Sansanosmilus rhomboidalis was described further, with new material assigned, in 2022.

== Description ==
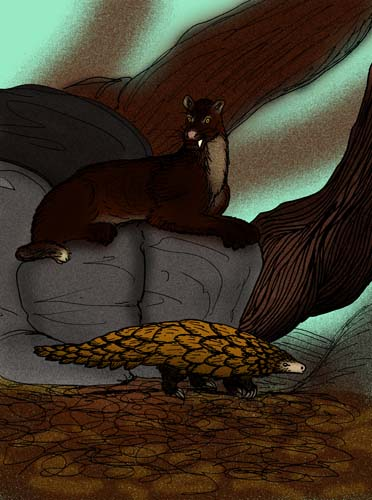
S. palmidens and Necromanis

Sansanosmilus had short legs, was very muscular and had a long tail. Sansanosmilus palmidens is believed to have been leopard-sized. S. palmidens is known from its well developed machairodont specialization in its skull, but with moderate saber teeth. Compared to Barbourofelis, it had smaller canines, less blade-like carnassials, and less derived mastoid region. In 1961, paleontologist L. Ginsburg concluded that Sansanosmilus was possessed of a plantigrade walking stance, after studying its foot bones and comparing it with those of the true felid Pseudaelurus from the same site. This is different from later barbourofelins, which are believed to have had semi-plantigrade or semi-digitigrade stances.

== Paleobiology ==
According to a 2012 study, S. palmidens had a jaw gape of 73°. The authors found based on the jaw anatomy of S. palmidens and other sabertooth predators, instead of being more suited of hunting megaherbivores, they were better suited for delivering deeper bites on smaller to medium sized prey. ^{Including supplementary materials} A 2020 study found that S. palmidens had an even lower jaw gape of 53°. ^{Including supplementary materials}

== Paleoecology ==
The type species, Sansanosmilus palmidens, is known from fossils from the Orleanian and Astaracian stages in France from 16 to 13 ma. ^{Including supplementary materials}
