= Vampyrictis =

Vampyrictis Temporal range: Miocene

Scientific classification
- Kingdom: Animalia
- Phylum: Chordata
- Class: Mammalia
- Order: Carnivora
- Family: †Nimravidae
- Subfamily: †Barbourofelinae
- Genus: †Vampyrictis; Kurtén, 1978

Type species
- †Vampyrictis vipera Kurtén, 1978

Extinct genus of barbourofelid

Vampyrictis is a fossil genus of barbourofelin containing a single species Vampyrictis vipera. It was described based on fragmentary jaw material from the Miocene-aged Beglia Formation in Tunisia.
