= Ginsburgsmilus =

Ginsburgsmilus Temporal range: Miocene

Scientific classification
- Kingdom: Animalia
- Phylum: Chordata
- Class: Mammalia
- Order: Carnivora
- Family: †Nimravidae
- Subfamily: †Barbourofelinae
- Genus: †Ginsburgsmilus; Morales, Salesa, Pickford, & Soria 2001
- Species: †G. napakensis

Binomial name
- †Ginsburgsmilus napakensis Morales, Salesa, Pickford, & Soria 2001

Extinct species of carnivore

Ginsburgsmilus is an extinct genus of carnivorous mammal of the subfamily Barbourofelinae. This genus was endemic to Africa during the early Miocene. There is only one known specimen of Ginsburgsmilus napakensis, dated to 20-19 mya.

== Taxonomy ==
Ginsburgsmilus was named by Morales et al. (2001). It was assigned to Barbourofelidae by Morlo et al. (2004) and Morlo (2006).

In 2001, a team led by Jorge Morales described Ginsburgsmilus as a new genus in the family Barbourofelidae; the fossil material had been previously identified as Afrosmilus turkanae.
