= Oriensmilus =

Oriensmilus Temporal range: Middle Miocene

Scientific classification
- Kingdom: Animalia
- Phylum: Chordata
- Class: Mammalia
- Infraclass: Placentalia
- Order: Carnivora
- Family: †Nimravidae
- Subfamily: †Barbourofelinae
- Genus: †Oriensmilus; Wang et al. 2020

Type species
- †Oriensmilus liupanensis Wang et al. 2020

Extinct genus of barbourofelid

Oriensmilus is a fossil genus of barbourofelin containing a single species Oriensmilus liupanensis. It was described in 2020 based a nearly complete skull from the Middle Miocene-aged Tongxin Basin in northern China.

The genus name comes from the Latin words "oriens", meaning "rising" but frequently used to refer to eastern Asia, and the Greek "smile" meaning "carving knife", in reference to the long canine teeth of other barbourofelines. The specific epithet liupanensis comes from the Liupan Mountains, where the Tongxin Basin is located.
