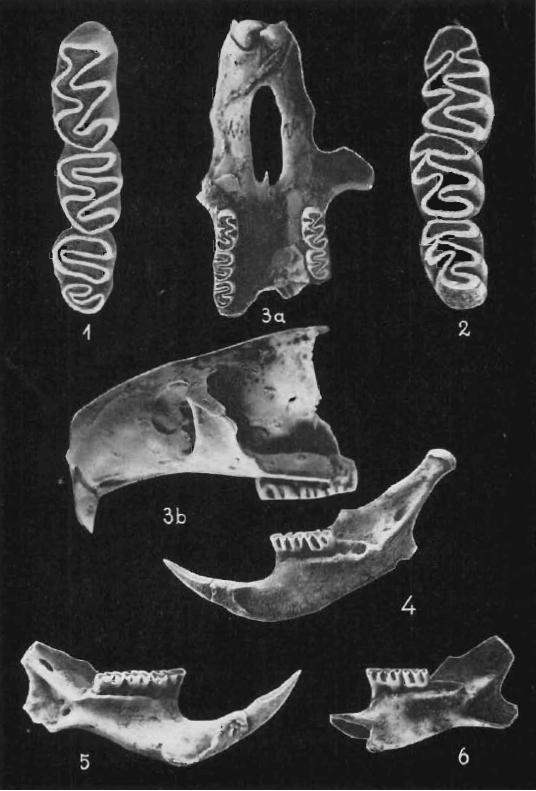

Scientific classification
- Kingdom: Animalia
- Phylum: Chordata
- Class: Mammalia
- Order: Rodentia
- Family: Cricetidae
- Genus: †Baranomys
- Species: †B. longidens

Binomial name
- †Baranomys longidens Kowalski, 1960

= Baranomys longidens =

Extinct species of rodent

Baranomys longidens is an extinct species of rodent from the Baranomys genus, from the Baranomyinae subfamily of the Cricetidae family. It lived in Pliocene epoch and was an ancestor to modern Arvicolinae. The fossils of the animals have been found in Europe, including near Gundersheim, Germany, and in Poland. It was first described by Kazimierz Kowalski in 1960.

== Discovery ==
The fossils of the animals have been found in Europe, including near Gundersheim, Germany, and in Poland. The species was first described by Kazimierz Kowalski in 1960. He based his research on fossils in a breccia rock, which were found in the Węże Nature Reserve, near the village of Węże in Łódź Voivodeship, Poland. It was first classified as microtodon longidens, and later reclassified as baranomys longidens.
