= Syrtosmilus =

Syrtosmilus Temporal range: Early Miocene

Scientific classification
- Kingdom: Animalia
- Phylum: Chordata
- Class: Mammalia
- Order: Carnivora
- Family: †Nimravidae
- Tribe: †Afrosmilini
- Genus: †Syrtosmilus; Ginsburg, 1978

Type species
- †Syrtosmilus syrtensis Ginsburg, 1978

Extinct genus of barbourofelid

Syrtosmilus is a fossil genus of barbourofelin with a single species Syrtosmilus syrtensis, which was described based on a single specimen: an edentulous mandible that was found at the Early Miocene-aged site of Gebel Zelten in Libya. Within the Barbourofelidae, it is classified as part of the tribe Afrosmilini.
