= Orleanian =

Geologic time period

The Orleanian age is a period of geologic time (MN 3–5, 20 to 16 million years ago (mya)), within the Miocene and used more specifically with European Land Mammal Ages. It precedes the Astaracian age and follows the Agenian age.

Agenian-Early Orleanian migration 23.8 to 18 mya

At the time for Oligocene-Miocene boundary (23.8 mya), the Tethys Seaway, a deep through between the Arabian and Iranian plates, isolated Africa from Eurasia; an isolation that lasted until the gradual closure of the Tethys at the end of MN 3 (19-18 mya), and America was connected to Asia by the Beringian landbridge. The horse-like equid Anchitherium dispersed into Asia over the latter and is known on the Iberian Peninsula from MN 3 and from Asia Minor in MN 6. It has not been found on the Balkan Peninsula, which suggests that the Balkans were isolated from Asia Minor at that time. In Western Europe, the pig-like suids Hyotherium appears in MN 1 and Xenohyus in MN 2. The hippo-like anthracothere Brachyodus appears in Western Europe in MN 3 and, while the MN 1-3 fauna is rare in the Eastern Mediterranean, also in Greece from around MN 3-4. The spalacid (rodent) Debruijnia is known from Asia Minor from MN 3 and from Aliveri, Greece, from early MN 4, suggesting the presence of some kind of early connection between Asia Minor and the Balkans.

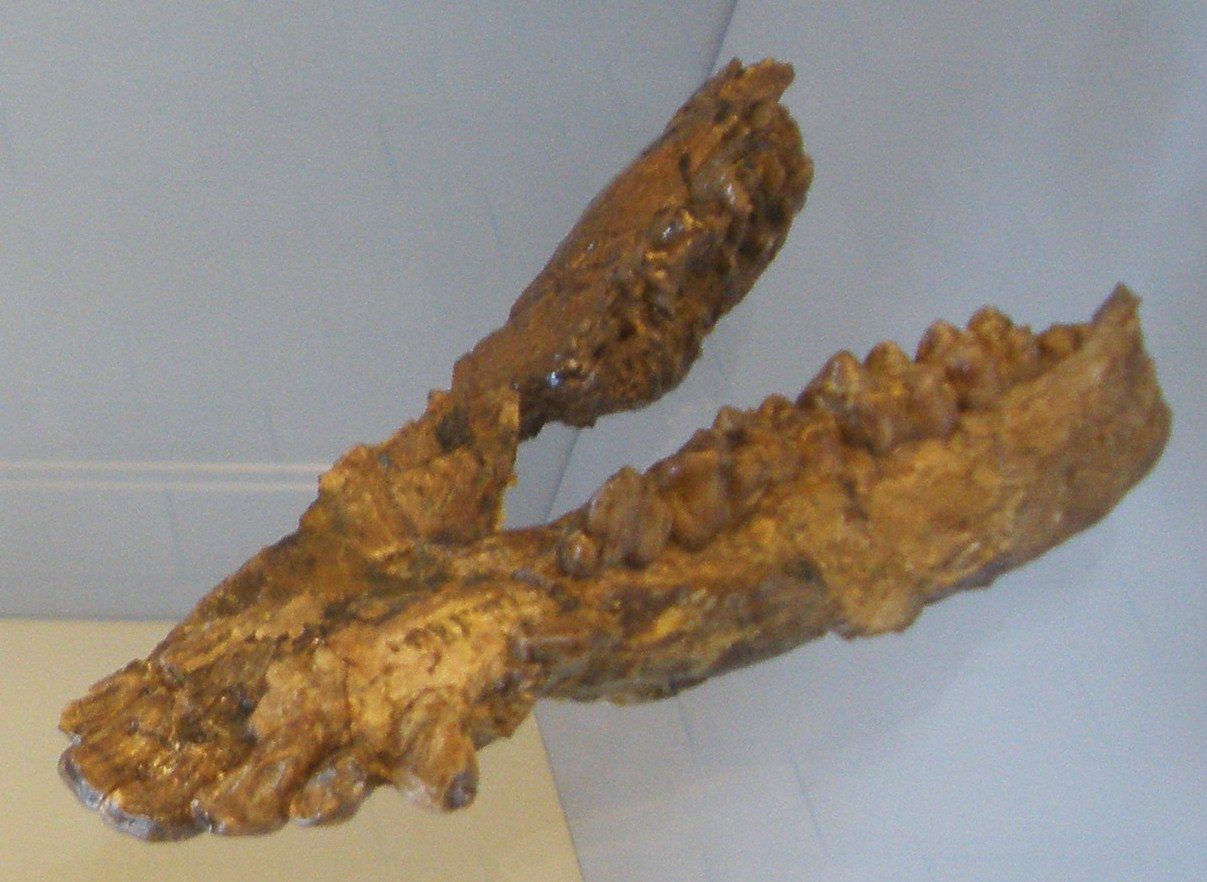
Hyotherium mandible

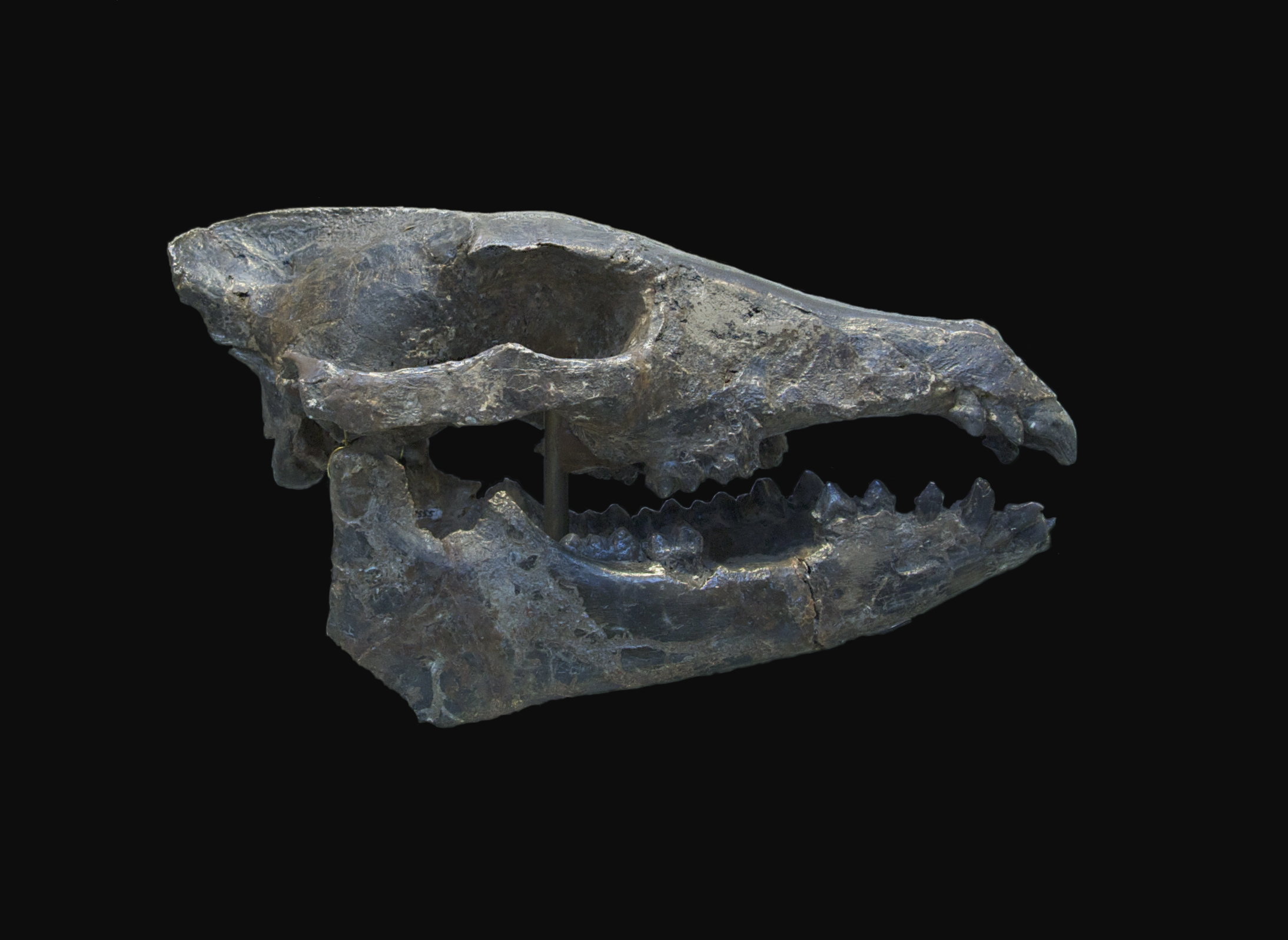
Hyotherium major skull

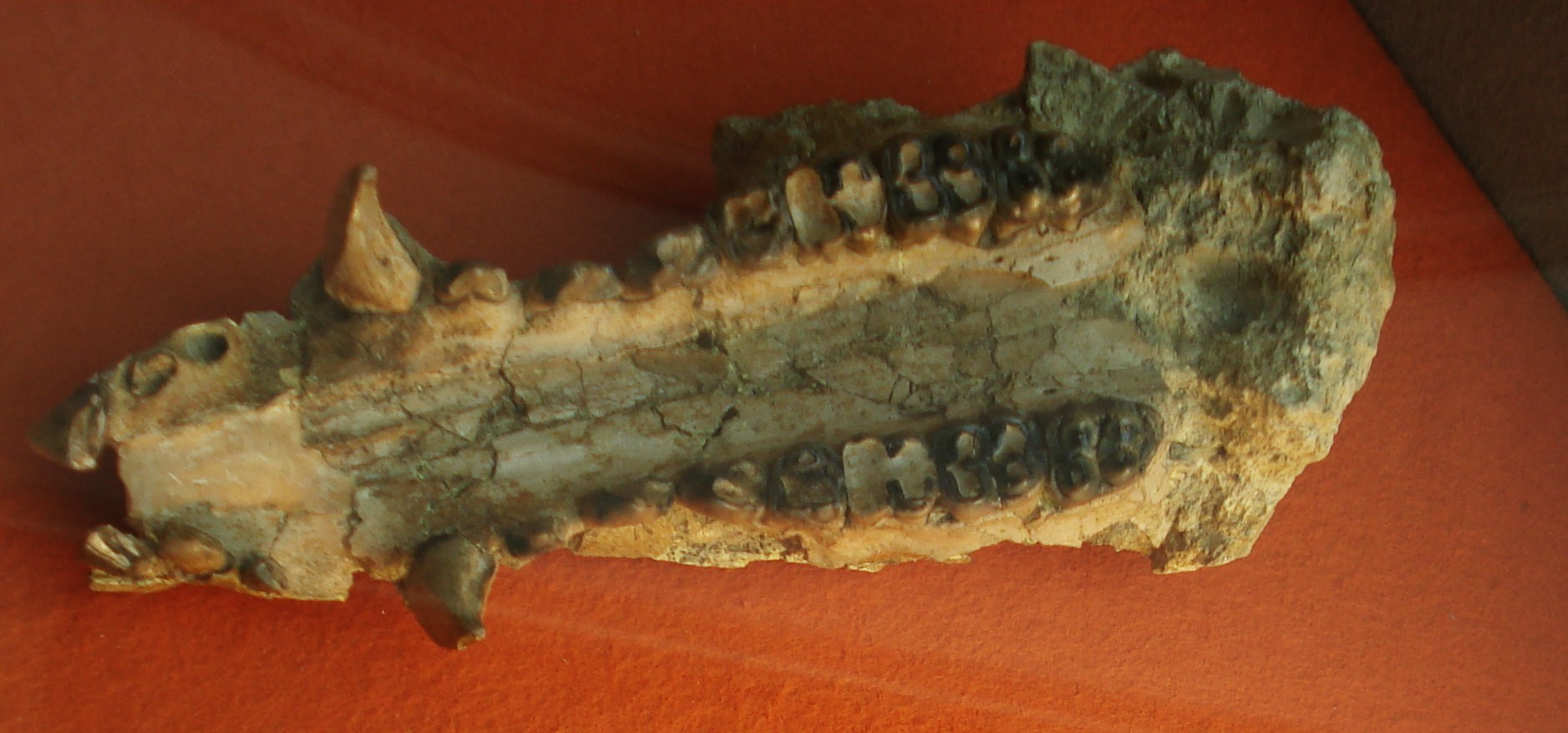
Hyotherium soemmeringi

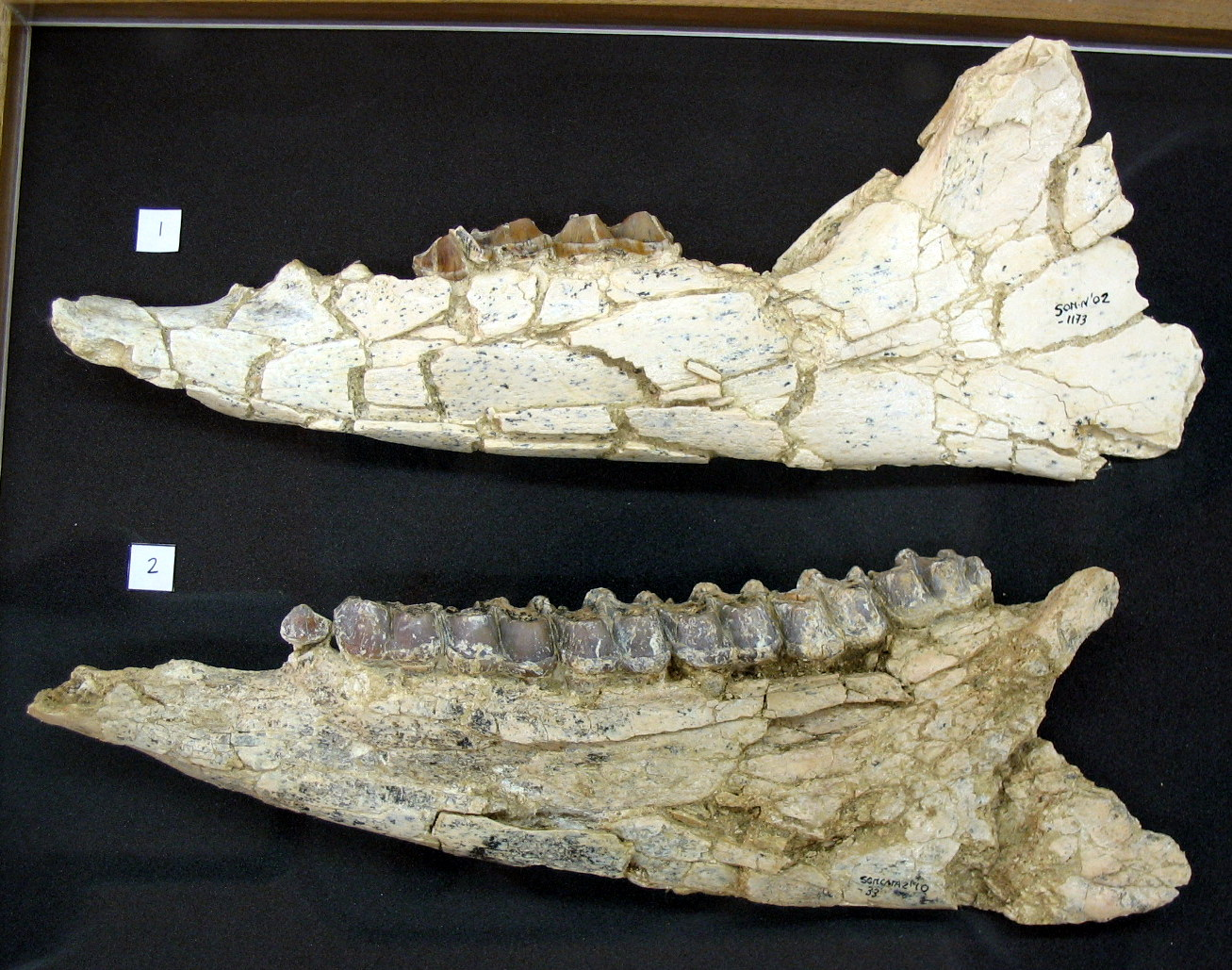
Anchitherium mandibles

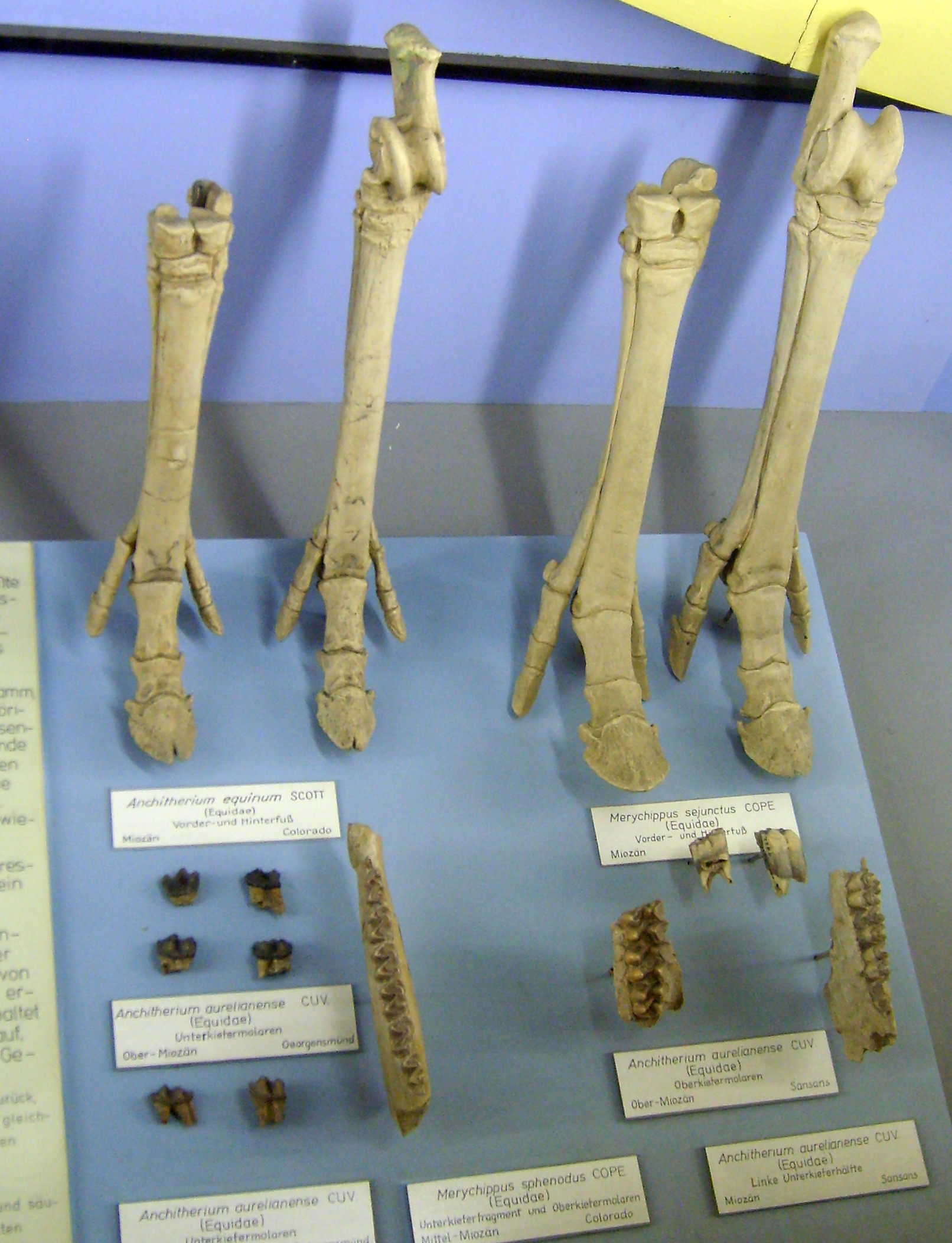
Anchitherium

Middle Orleanian migration 18 to 17 mya

The connection between Eurasia and Africa, known as the "Gomphotherium land bridge", was re-established at the end of MN 3. However, temporary landbridges appears to have connected Africa to Eurasia before the final closure of the Tethys Seaway, allowing some mammals to emigrate between the landmasses. With the Balkans solidly connected to Asia Minor, the seaways to the Paratethys were closed, which transformed the shallow sea into an isolated basin with its own endemic fauna. The Gomphotherium-landbridge provided the African hyrocoid Pliohyrax with the opportunity to emigrate to India where it is known from the end of MN 3. It has been found in Turkey from MN 6 and, as the primitive deinothere (elephant-like) Prodeinotherium is known from Lesbos, Greece, it seems likely there was a connection between the regions around 18.4 mya.

Emigration occurred in both directions across the landbridge around 20.7 mya. The MN 3 fauna of Negev, Israel, provides a mixture of African and Eurasian taxa representative for this interchange: the elephant-like Prodeinotherium and Gomphotherium, the carnivorous Anasinopa, the small ungulate Dorcatherium, the early pika Kenyalagomys, and rodent Megapedetes from Africa; and the bovid Eotragus, the suid Listriodon, and Rhinocerotidae from Asia. The first to emigrate from Africa were the proboscideans (elephant-like) Gomphoteres and Deinotheres who eventually formed part of the Bugti fauna in India around 18.3 mya and are known from the eastern Mediterranean around 18.4 mya and the Iberian Peninsula at the beginning of MN 4, 18 mya. Emigrants from Asia, included the bovid Eotragus, the suid Bunolistriodon, the nimravid (cat) Prosansanosmilus, and rodents such as Megacricetodon, Democricetodon, Cricetodon, and Eumyarion. The subfamily Democricetodontinae appeared in Asia Minor during MN 1-2, in Africa and Asia during MN 3, in America during MN 3-4 and finally in the Balkans and Western Europe during MN 4.

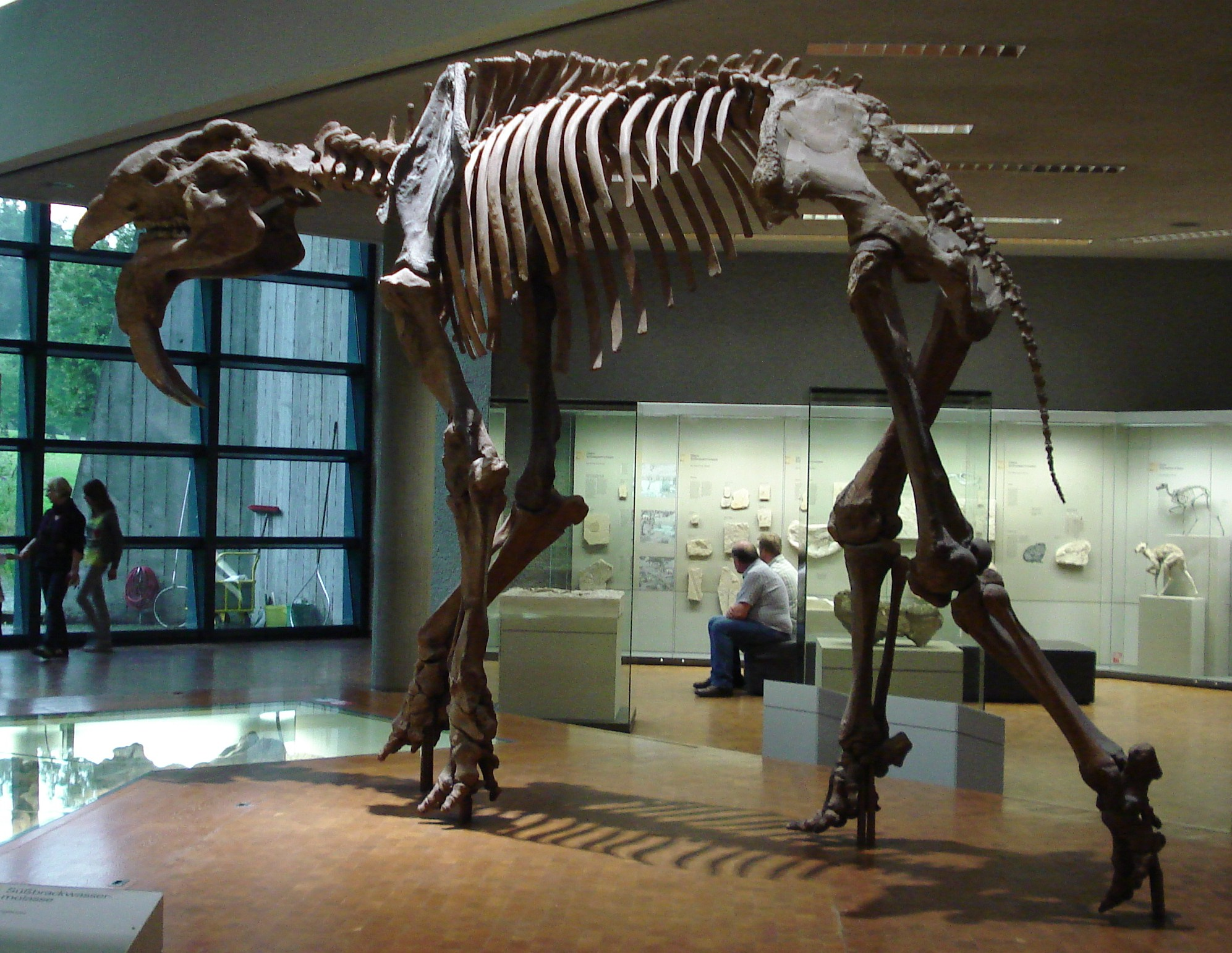
Prodeinotherium bavaricum

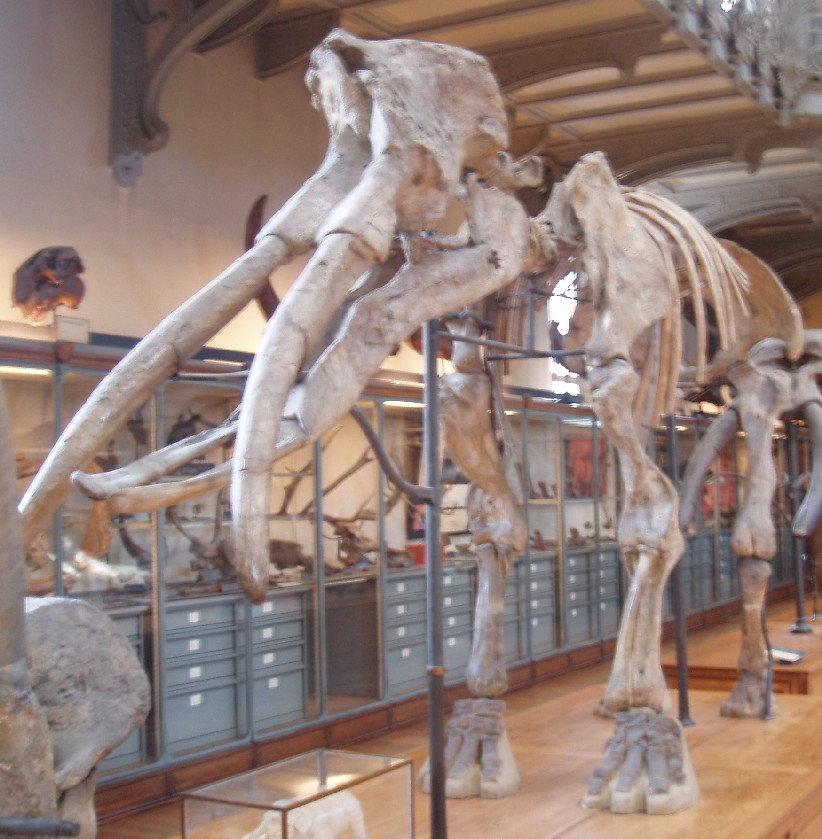
Gomphotherium angustidens

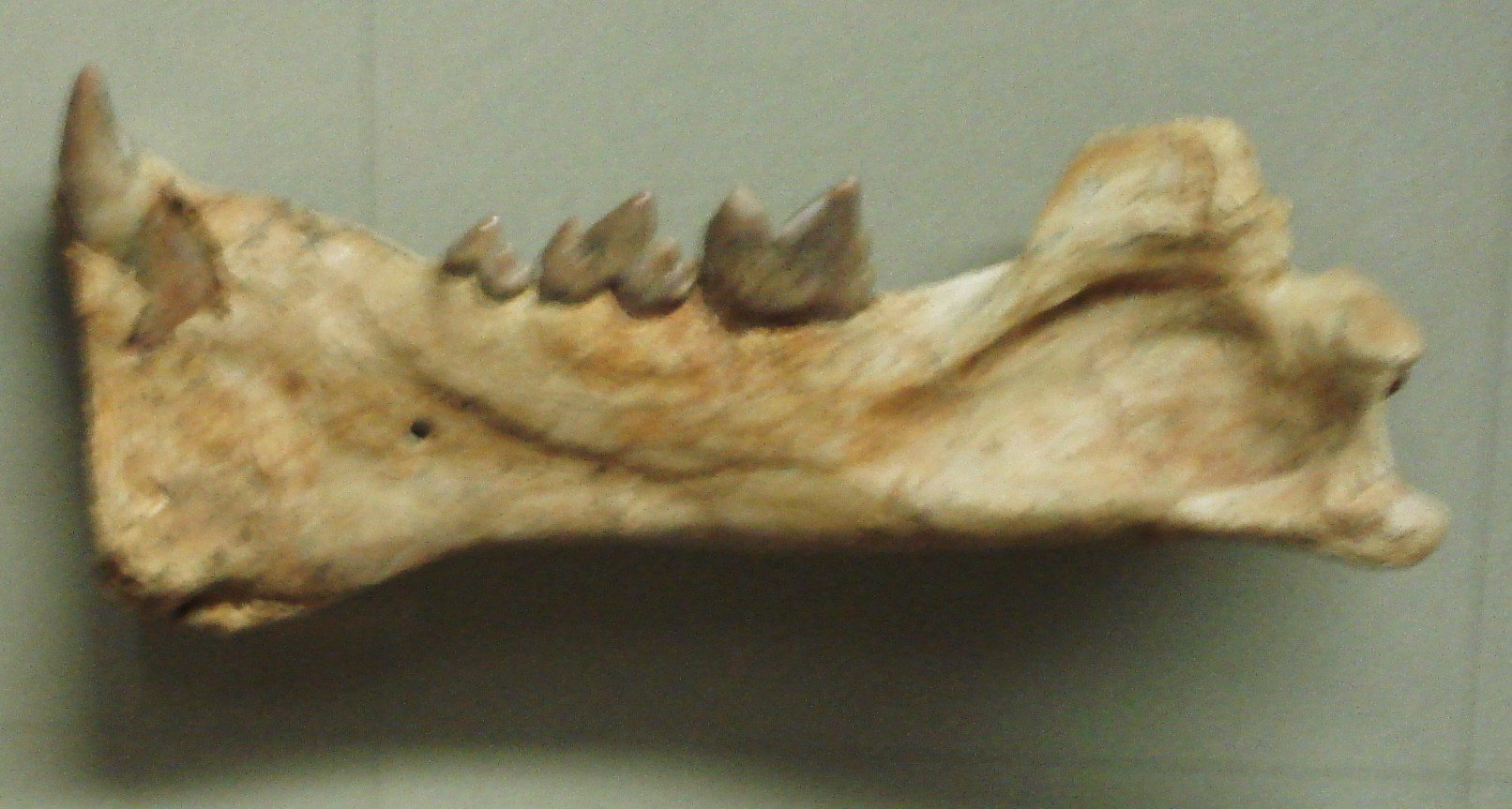
Prosansanosmilus mandible

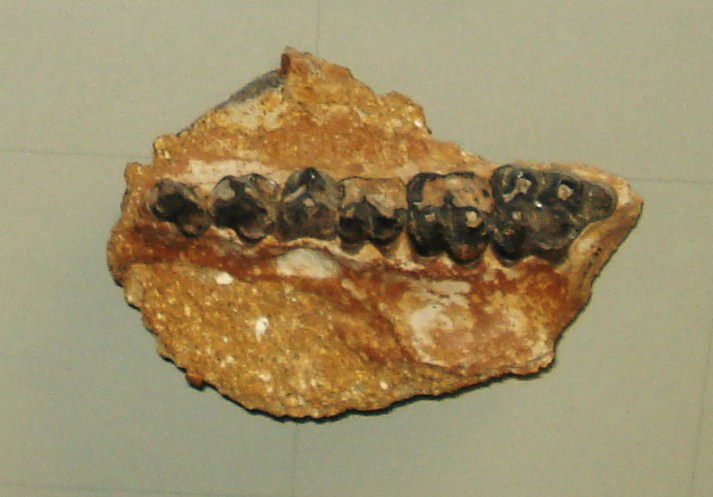
Bunolistriodon maxilla

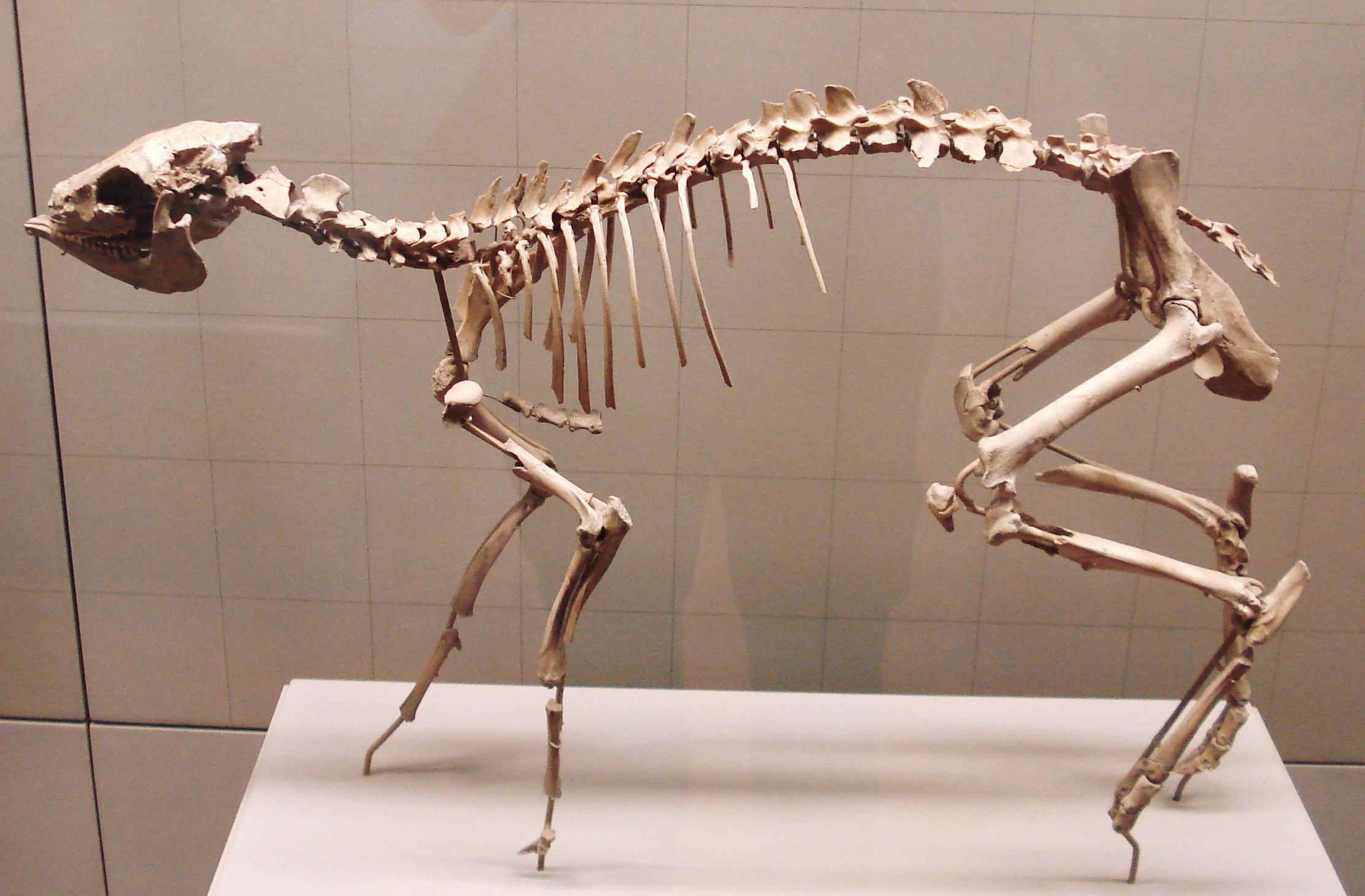
Dorcatherium

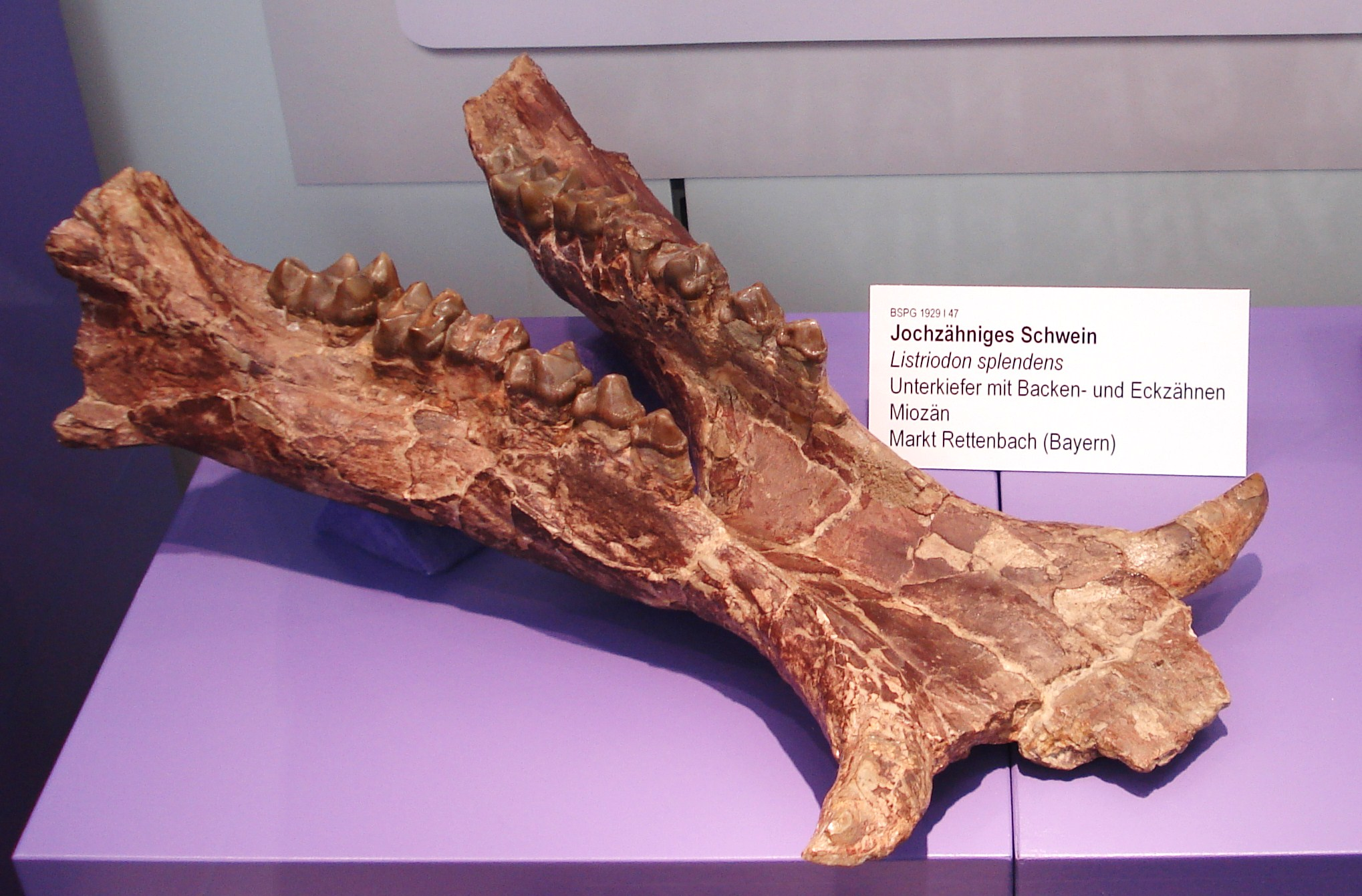
Mandible of Listriodon splendens

== See also ==
- Langhian
