= Anatolomys =

Scientific classification
- Kingdom: Animalia
- Phylum: Chordata
- Class: Mammalia
- Order: Rodentia
- Family: Cricetidae
- Subfamily: †Baranomyinae
- Genus: †Anatolomys; Schaub, 1934

Extinct genus of rodent

Anatolomys is an extinct genus of rodent, from the Baranomyinae subfamily of the Cricetidae family. It lived in Pliocene epoch, and its fossils have been found in the People's Republic of China. The only species in the genus, Anatolomys teilhardi, was described by Samuel Schaub in 1934.
