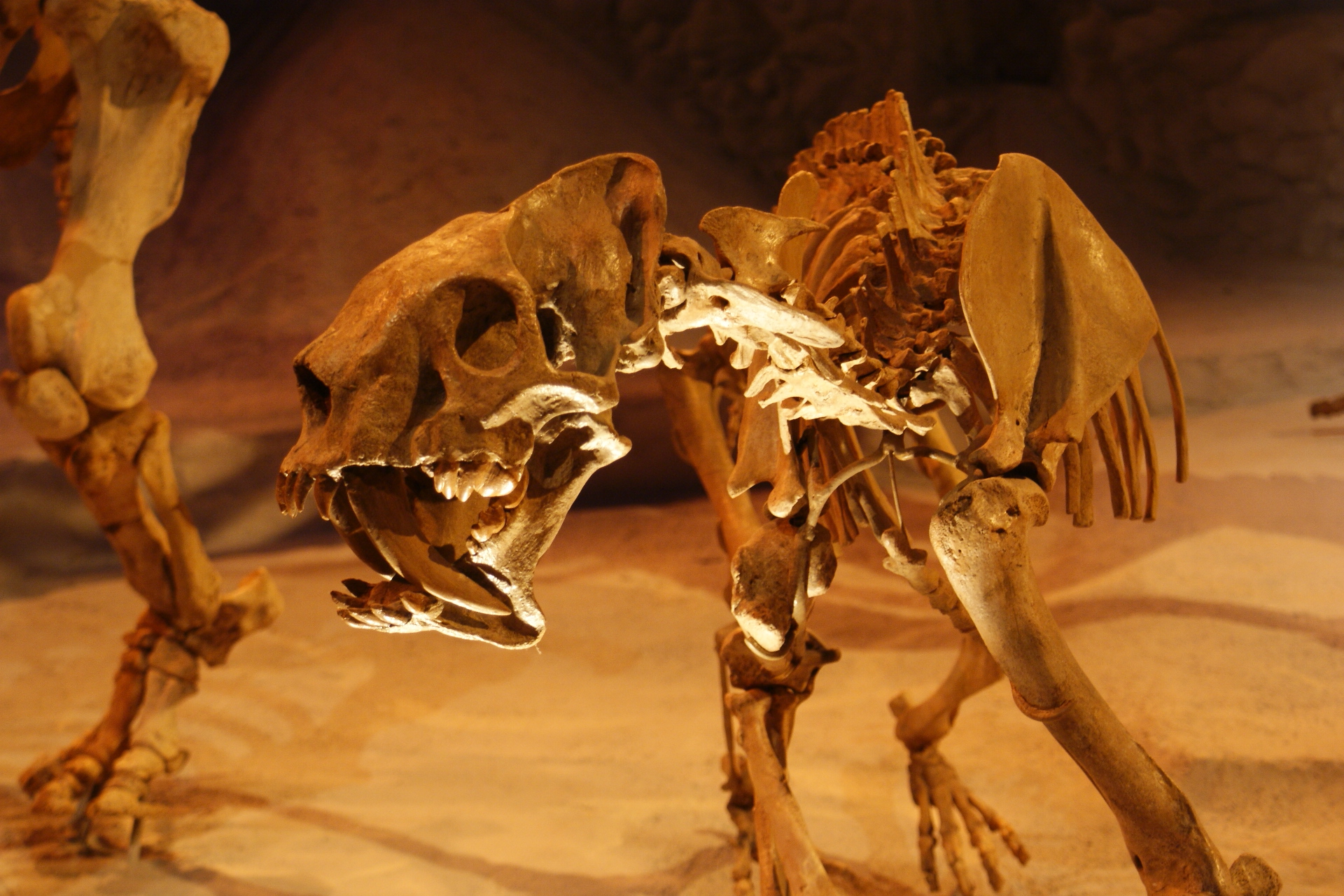
- Barbourofelis loveorum at the Florida Museum of Natural History

Scientific classification
- Kingdom: Animalia
- Phylum: Chordata
- Class: Mammalia
- Order: Carnivora
- Family: †Nimravidae
- Subfamily: †Barbourofelinae; Schultz, et al., 1970

Genera
- †Ginsburgsmilus; †Syrtosmilus; †Vampyrictis; †Oriensmilus; Tribe †Afrosmilini; †Afrosmilus; †Prosansanosmilus; †Jinomrefu; Tribe †Barbourofelini; †Albanosmilus; †Barbourofelis; †Sansanosmilus

= Barbourofelinae =

Barbourofelinae Temporal range: Miocene, 22.8–7 Ma

Extinct subfamily of carnivores

Barbourofelinae is a subfamily of carnivorans within the extinct family of feliforms known as Nimravidae. Sometimes known as false saber-toothed cats, that lived in North America, Eurasia and Africa during the Miocene epoch (22.8—7 million years ago) and existed for about 15.8 million years. Once thought to have been an independent lineage from the nimravids and Machairodontinae, most experts in recent years have reclassified them as nimravids.

== Taxonomy ==
The type genus, Barbourofelis, was originally described by Schultz et al. (1970) and assigned to a new tribe, Barbourofelini, within the felid subfamily Machairodontinae, along with the other sabre-toothed cats. Subsequently, the tribe was reassigned to the Nimravidae by Tedford (1978) and raised to a subfamily by Bryant (1991). However, a number of studies in the early 2000s identified a closer affinity of the barbourofelines to the Felidae than to the Nimravidae and they were reranked as a distinct family by Morlo et al. (2004). During the 2010s, prevailing view has the barbourofelids as the sister group to the Felidae, although this was challenged in 2020, following the description of the middle Miocene genus Oriensmilus from northern China, which provided evidence, mainly based on basicranial morphology, that barbourofelids may be more closely related to nimravids than to felids. Since then, the majority of experts had reclassified them as nimravids.

Barbourofelines first appear in the fossil record in the Early Miocene of Africa, believed to have evolved from nimravine migrating into Africa. By the end of the Early Miocene, a land bridge had opened between Africa and Eurasia, allowing for a faunal exchange between the two continents. Barbourofelines migrated at least three times from Africa to Europe. While the genus Sansanosmilus evolved in Europe, Albanosmilus jourdani also migrated through Eurasia and reached North America by the late Miocene, represented there by the genus Barbourofelis and the North American species A. whitfordi.

A further two species of Sansanosmilus (S. rhomboidalis and S. serratus) were described by G.E. Pilgrim in 1932 based on fragmentary fossils from the Siwaliks, and a third species from the same area and of similarly fragmentary nature, Sivasmilus copei, was described by Miklos Kretzoi in 1929. Sansanosmilus rhomboidalis was described further, with new material assigned, in 2022.

A much older species, Oriensmilus liupanensis, was described in 2020. Unlike other older barbourofelines, it was found in China.

Another species of Afrosmilini from Africa, Jinomrefu lakwanza, was also described in 2020. Further research into the relations of Afrosmilini was published in 2021; along with assigning new material to various species, it described an unusual specimen (FT3366, a p4) from Fort Ternan that could not be assigned to any genus, and suggested the Ginsburgsmilus was also part of Afrosmilini.

=== Classification ===
- Subfamily †Barbourofelinae
  - †Oriensmilus
    - †Oriensmilus liupanensis
  - †Sivasmilus
    - †Sivasmilus copei
  - †Vampyrictis
    - †Vampyrictis vipera
  - Tribe †Afrosmilini
    - †Afrosmilus
      - †Afrosmilus africanus
      - †Afrosmilus hispanicus
      - †Afrosmilus turkanae
    - †Ginsburgsmilus (Morales, Salesa, Pickford, & Soria; 2001)
      - †Ginsburgsmilus napakensis
    - †Jinomrefu
      - †Jinomrefu lakwanza
    - †Prosansanosmilus (Heizmann, Ginsburg, & Bulot; 1980)
      - †Prosansanosmilus eggeri
      - †Prosansanosmilus peregrinus
    - †Syrtosmilus
      - †Syrtosmilus syrtensis
  - Tribe †Barbourofelini
    - †Albanosmilus (Kretzoi, 1929)
      - †Albanosmilus jourdani
      - †Albanosmilus whitfordi
    - †Barbourofelis (Schultz, Schultz & Martin; 1970)
      - †Barbourofelis fricki
      - †Barbourofelis loveorum
      - †Barbourofelis morrisi
      - †Barbourofelis piveteaui
    - †Sansanosmilus (Kretzoi, 1929)
      - †Sansanosmilus palmidens
      - †Sansanosmilus rhomboidalis
      - †Sansanosmilus serratus

=== Phylogeny ===
The phylogenetic relationships of Barbourofelidae are shown in the following cladogram:

- †Barbourofelidae
  - - †Vampyrictis
      †Vampyrictis vipera
    - †Syrtosmilus
      †Syrtosmilus syrtensis
  - †Ginsburgsmilus
    †Ginsburgsmilus napakensis
  - - †Afrosmilini
      - †Afrosmilus
        - - †Afrosmilus africanus
          - †Afrosmilus hispanicus
        - †Afrosmilus turkanae
      - †Prosansanosmilus
        - †Prosansanosmilus eggeri
        - †Prosansanosmilus peregrinus
    - †Barbourofelini
      - †Sansanosmilus
        †Sansanosmilus palmidens
      - - †Albanosmilus
          - †Albanosmilus jourdani
          - †Albanosmilus whitfordi
        - †Barbourofelis
          - †Barbourofelis loveorum
          - - †Barbourofelis morrisi
            - †Barbourofelis fricki
            - †Barbourofelis piveteaui

== Palaeoecology ==
The arrival of barbourofelines in North America, along with that of felids, is believed to have played a role in the extinction of hesperocyonines by intensifying competition, causing a suppression of origination of new hesperocyonine species and an increase in extinction rates.
