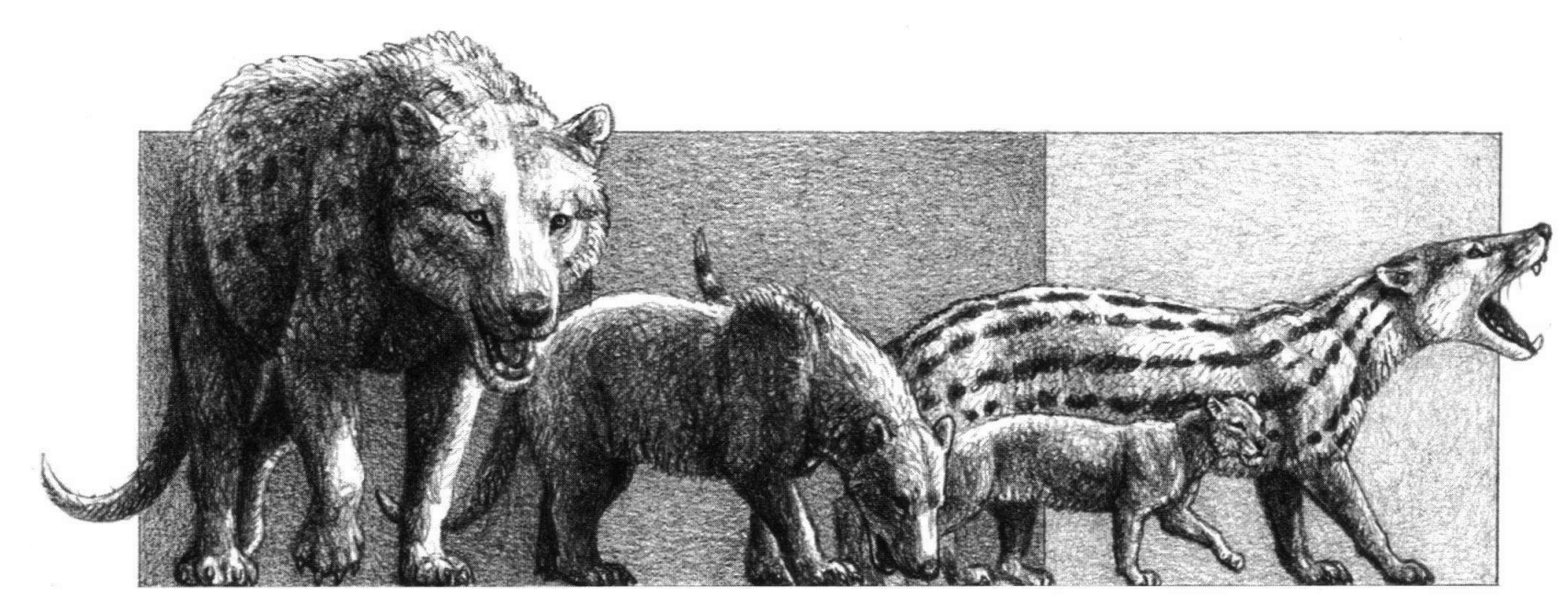
- Restoration of Hyainailouros sulzeri (far left), Cynelos eurydon, Afrosmilus africanus and Hyainailouros napakensis (far right)

Scientific classification
- Kingdom: Animalia
- Phylum: Chordata
- Class: Mammalia
- Order: Carnivora
- Family: †Nimravidae
- Tribe: †Afrosmilini
- Genus: †Afrosmilus; Kretzoi, 1929

Type species
- †Afrosmilus africanus (Andrews, 1914)

Species
- †Afrosmilus hispanicus Morales et al., 2001; †Afrosmilus turkanae Schmidt-Kittler, 1987

= Afrosmilus =

Afrosmilus Temporal range: Middle Miocene

Extinct genus of barbourofelid

Afrosmilus is a fossil genus of afrosmilin barbourofelin. It lived in Africa during the middle Miocene.

== Taxonomy and evolution ==
The species Pseudaelurus africanus was first described in 1914; in 1929 it was assigned to the new genus Afrosmilus by Miklós Kretzoi.

A second species Afrosmilus turkanae was described in 1987.

In 2001, a third species, Afrosmilus hispanicus, was described along with the closely related genus Ginsburgsmilus; for these earlier African barbourofelines the tribe Afrosmilini was erected.
