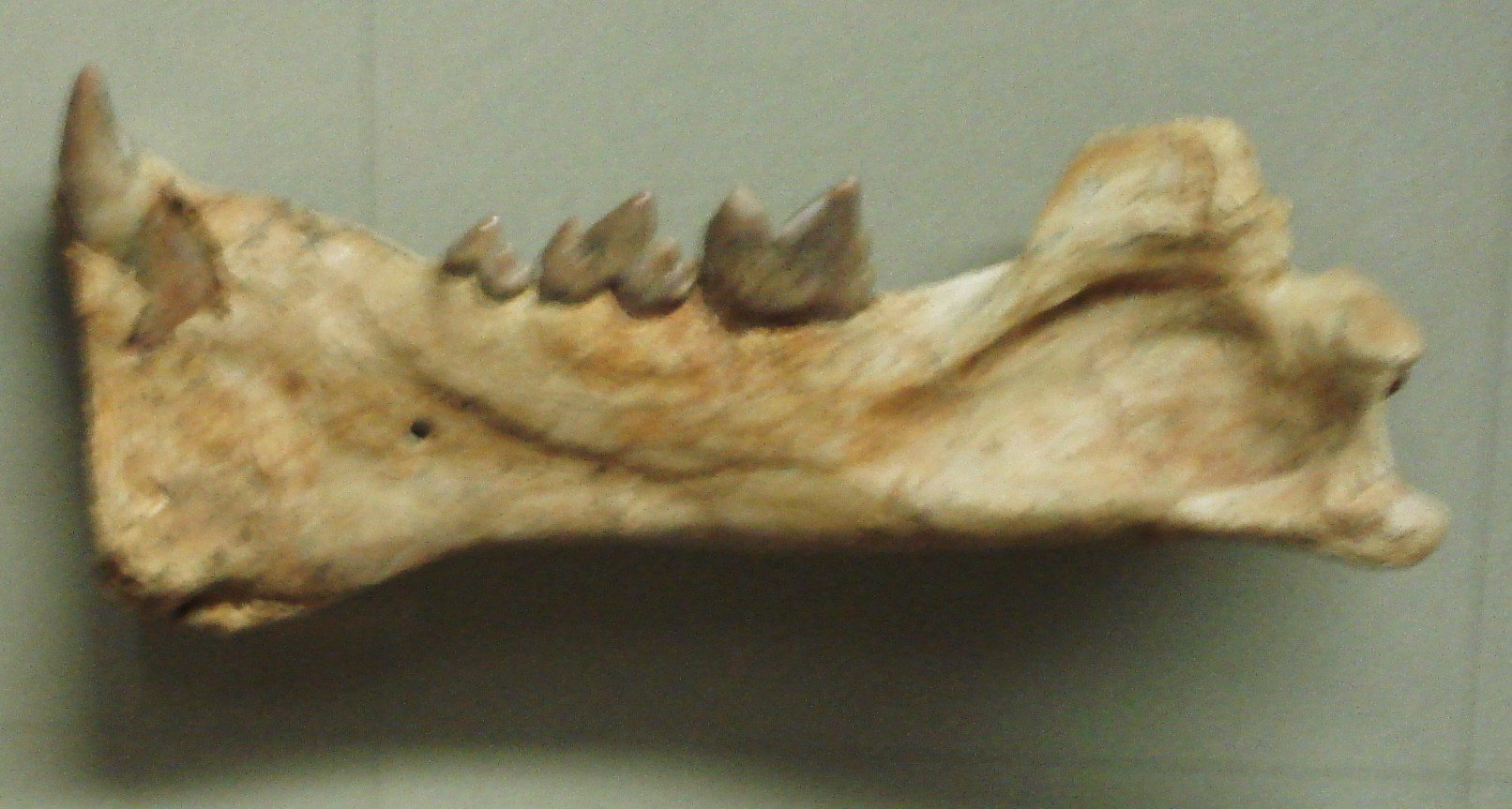
- Prosansanosmilus mandible

Scientific classification
- Kingdom: Animalia
- Phylum: Chordata
- Class: Mammalia
- Order: Carnivora
- Family: †Nimravidae
- Tribe: †Afrosmilini
- Genus: †Prosansanosmilus; Heizmann, Ginsburg, & Bulot, 1980

Type species
- Prosansanosmilus peregrinus Heizmann, Ginsburg, & Bulot, 1980

Other Species
- Prosansanosmilus eggeri Morlo, Peigné & Nagel, 2004

= Prosansanosmilus =

Prosansanosmilus Temporal range: Early Miocene (Orleanian to Astaracian), 18–15.97 Ma

Extinct genus of carnivores

Prosansanosmilus is an extinct genus of barbourofelin that lived in Europe during the Early Miocene epoch from 18 to 15.97 mya, existing for approximately 2.03 million years. ^{Including supplementary materials} It contains Prosansanosmilus peregrinus, which died out in the Miocene epoch.

== Taxonomy ==
Prosansanosmilus was named in 1980 by Heizmann et al. with the type species Prosansanosmilus peregrinus. It was assigned to Nimravinae by Heizmann et al. (1980); to Felidae by Carroll (1988); to Barbourofelinae by Bryant (1991); and to Barbourofelidae by Morlo et al. (2004) and Morlo (2006).

A second species, P. eggeri from the Middle Miocene locality of Sandelzhausen, Germany, was described in 2004. It differed from other European barbourofelids in having a more plesiomorphic ("ancestral") morphology, with less developed sabretooth adaptations and being smaller. However, the species is stratigraphically younger than P. peregrinus; and probably part of the African faunal immigration into Europe during the Middle Eocene.

== Distribution ==
P. peregrinus lived in MN4 of France and Germany. Two fossils of P. peregrinus have been found in France and another two have been found in Germany. P. peregrinus was a ground-dwelling creature.

== Morphology ==
Like all barbourofelids, Prosansanosmilus was very muscular, short legged and probably walked plantigrade (flat-footed). There are only two species of Prosansanosmilus, which lived in Spain, France and Germany during the Late Miocene epoch.

== Time range ==
P. peregrinus is thought to have lived between 16.9 and 16 Mya. New evidence suggests that P. peregrinus lived 20–16 Mya. German scientists excavated a fossil of P. peregrinus dating 20 Mya. Other scientists think that P. peregrinus lived between 16.9 and 15.7 Mya.
