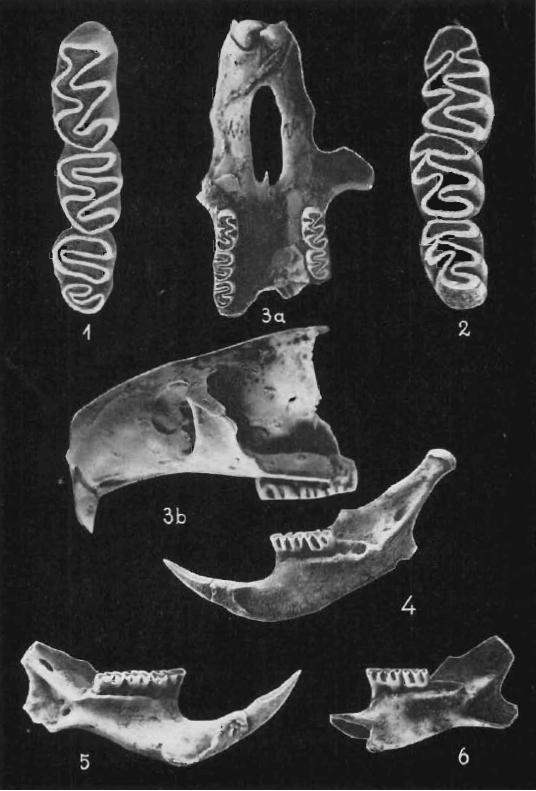
- Fossils of Baranomys longidens.

Scientific classification
- Kingdom: Animalia
- Phylum: Chordata
- Class: Mammalia
- Order: Rodentia
- Family: Cricetidae
- Subfamily: †Baranomyinae; Kretzoi, 1955

= Baranomyinae =

Extinct subfamily of rodents

Baranomyinae is an extinct subfamily of rodent from the Cricetidae family, that inhabited Asia, Europe, and North America in the Pliocene epoch. It was first described by Miklós Kretzoi in 1955.

== Genera ==
- Anatolomys Schaub, 1934
- Baranomys Kormos, 1933
- Microtodon Miller, 1928
- Ellesmereomys (Martin & Zakrzewski, 2023)
