= Miklós Kretzoi =

Hungarian geologist and paleontologist

- Born: 9 February 1907; Budapest, Austro-Hungarian Empire
- Died: 15 March 2005 (aged 98)
- Citizenship: Hungary
- Education: Pázmány Péter University, University of Pécs
- Known for: Paleoanthropology
- Awards: Széchenyi Prize
- Scientific career
- Fields: Geology, paleontology

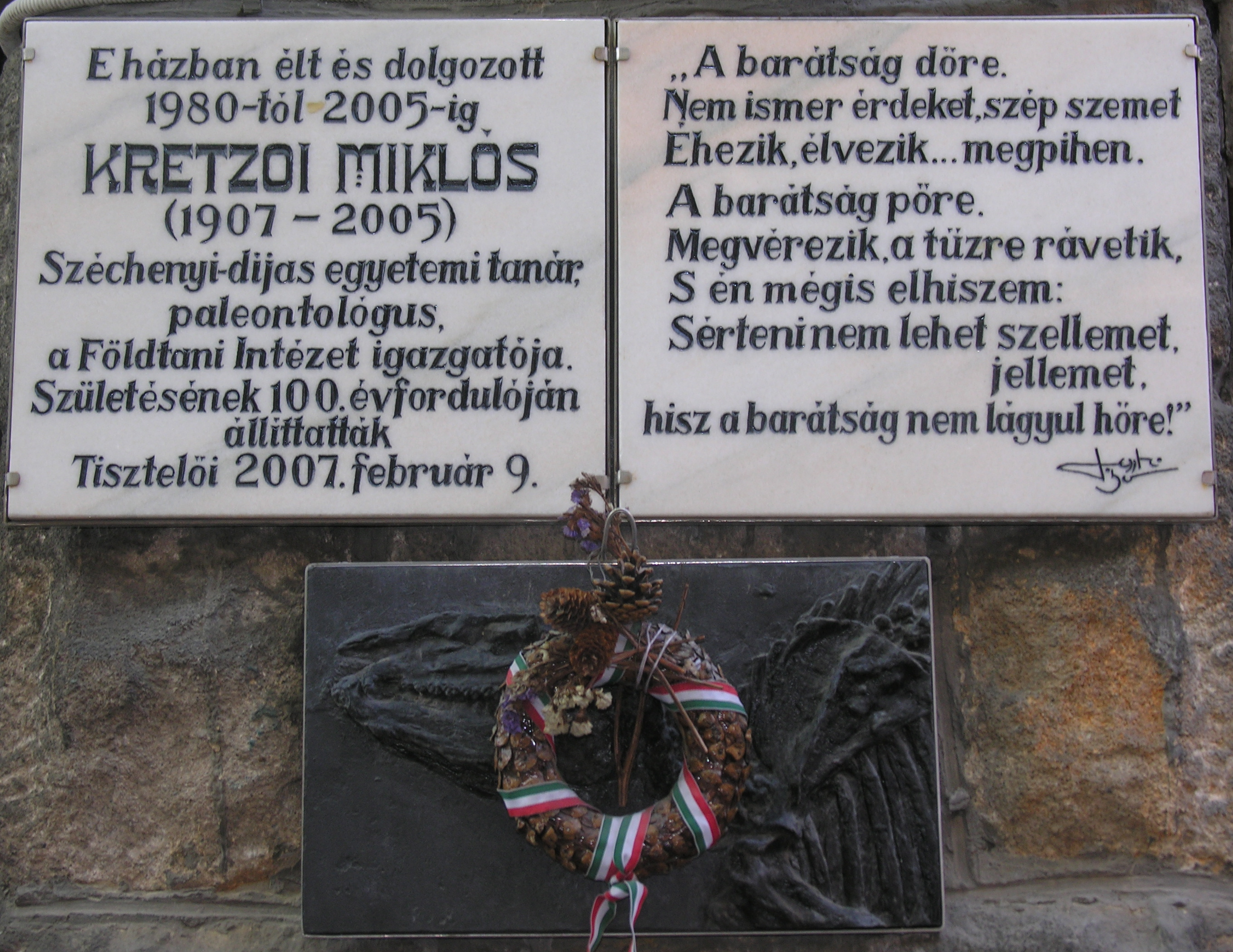
Commemorative plaque in Budapest

Miklós Kretzoi (9 February 1907 – 15 March 2005) was a Hungarian geologist, paleontologist and paleoanthropologist and Széchenyi Prize winner.

Kretzoi studied Arts and natural sciences at the then Pázmány Péter University, Budapest from 1925 to 1929. While still a student, he worked as a volunteer at the Geological Institute of Hungary.

In 1930 he graduated from the University of Pécs with a PhD in Palaeontology, Geology and Geography. In 1933 he commenced work with the "Hungarian-American Oil Inc" as a geologist and geophysicist. He remained at Hungarian-American Oil until the outbreak of the Second World War. Kretzoi moved to the National Museum of Hungary where he was curator of the Mineralogy and Paleontology departments until he began work at the Geological Institute of Hungary in 1950. Kretzoi was the director of the Geological Institute of Hungary from 1956 to 1958. From the mid-1960s he led the "digs" at Rudabánya where a number of Anthropoid fossil remains were discovered.

The genus Kretzoiarctos was named after Miklós Kretzoi. Its type species Kretzoiarctos beatrix was previously classified as a member of Agriarctos, and Agriarctos was described by Kretzoi.
