= Chambers Tuff =

Geologic group in Texas, United States

- Stratigraphic range: mid-late Eocene (late Duchesnean - early Chadronian, 38.29 - 37.14 Ma)
- Type: Formation
- Unit of: Vieja Group
- Underlies: Bracks Rhyolite
- Overlies: Buckshot Ignimbrite

Lithology
- Primary: sandstone, siltstone, conglomerate, tuff

Location
- Region: Texas
- Country: United States

Type section
- Named by: DeFord (1958)

The Chambers Tuff (or Chambers Tuff Formation) is a geological formation in the Trans-Pecos area of Texas. It preserves fossils dating back to the Eocene epoch, across the boundary between the Duchesnean and Chadronian North American land mammal ages. The Chambers Tuff is the middle of three fossil-bearing sedimentary formations in the Vieja Group, alongside the older Colmena Tuff and younger Capote Mountain Tuff.

== Geology ==
Though named as a tuff (airborne ash deposit), most of the Chambers Tuff actually represents water-carried sediments. Most of it comprises multicolored fine-grained sediments, alongside coarse gray conglomerates and a few marker beds with legitimate ash content. The lower marker bed is a soft pale-colored tuff about 100–175 feet above the base of the Chambers Tuff as a whole. The upper marker bed is a tough layer of sanidine-based dark red sandstone higher in the section. A third marker bed, another red sandstone layer, is occasionally found near the top of the Chambers Tuff.

Radiometric (^{40}Ar/^{39}Ar) dating has not been attempted for the Chambers Tuff itself, but it is possible for the volcanic layers which bracket it. Depending on the study, the underlying Buckshot Ignimbrite has been dated to anywhere between 38.29 ± 0.16 Ma and 37.68 ± 0.06 Ma. The overlying Bracks Rhyolite is dated to anywhere between 37.14 ± 0.08 Ma and 36.67 ± 0.04 Ma.

== Paleobiota ==
Mammal fossils are found at two particular local faunas in the Chambers Tuff, both found in Presidio County:

- The Porvenir local fauna occurs in the lower layers of the Chambers Tuff, below the lower marker bed and up to 100 feet above it. It corresponds to the late Duchesnean NALMA and an early part of magnetostratigraphic chron C17n.
- The Little Egypt local fauna occurs in the higher layers of the Chambers Tuff, exposed at sites such as Reeves Bonebed and Chalk Gap Draw. It corresponds to the earliest Chadronian NALMA and magnetostratigraphic chron C17n.1n. The Rancho Gaitan local fauna, in Chihuahua, Mexico, is very close to the Little Egypt local fauna in age and environment. Natural endocasts (brain molds) are abundant in the Reeves bonebed.

=== Mammals ===
==== Artiodactyla ====
Artiodactyls of the Chambers Tuff
Genus / Taxon	Species	Local fauna	Notes	Images
Aclistomycter	A.? dunagani	Little Egypt	An early aclistomycterine merycoidodontid (oreodont). Previously considered a species of Merycoidodon.	
Aclistomycter	A. middletoni	Porvenir	An early aclistomycterine merycoidodontid (oreodont).	
Agriochoerus	A. antiquus	Porvenir, Little Egypt	An agriochoerid (claw-bearing oreodont relative).	
Archaeotherium	A. cf. A. mortoni	Porvenir, Little Egypt	An entelodont (boar-like relative of hippos).	
Bathygenys	B. reevesi	Little Egypt	An early oreonetine merycoidodontid (oreodont).	
Brachyhyops	B. wyomingensis	Porvenir	An entelodont (boar-like relative of hippos).	
Eotylopus	E. cf. reedi	Little Egypt	An oromerycid (early camel).	
Hendryomeryx	H. defordi	Porvenir	A leptomerycid. Previously considered a species of Leptomeryx.	
Heteromeryx	H. dispar	Porvenir	An early protoceratid.	
Hidrosotherium	H. transpecoensis	Porvenir	A leptomerycid.	
Oromeryx	O. sp.	Porvenir	An oromerycid (early camel).	
Poabromylus	P. kayi	Porvenir	An early protoceratid.	
Protoreodon	P. pumilus	Porvenir	An agriochoerid (claw-bearing oreodont relative).	
Pseudoprotoceras	P. minor	Porvenir	An early protoceratid. Previously considered a species of Poabromylus.	

==== Carnivora ====
Carnivorans of the Chambers Tuff
Genus / Taxon	Species	Local fauna	Notes	Images
Angelarctocyon	A. australis	Porvenir	An indeterminate amphicyonid ("bear-dog"). Previously considered a species of Miacis.	
Brachyrhynchocyon	B. dodgei	Little Egypt	A daphoenine amphicyonid ("bear-dog"). Formerly known as Daphoenocyon dodgei.	
Daphoenictis	D. sp.	Porvenir	A daphoenine amphicyonid ("bear-dog").	
Daphoenus	D. lambei	Porvenir	A daphoenine amphicyonid ("bear-dog").	
Feliformia	indet.	Little Egypt	An unusual snout fragment with a deep premaxilla, broad incisors, and large canines. Potentially a new species of felid (cat) or nimravid ("false saber-toothed cat").	
Gustafsonia	G. cognita	Little Egypt	An indeterminate amphicyonid ("bear-dog"). Previously considered a species of Miacis.	

==== Eulipotyphla ====
Eulipotyphlans of the Chambers Tuff
Genus / Taxon	Species	Local fauna	Notes	Images
Centetodon	C. chadronensis	Porvenir	A geolabidid.	
Apternodus	A. iliffensis	Porvenir	An apternodontid.	

==== Hyaenodonta ====
Hyaenodonts of the Chambers Tuff
Genus / Taxon	Species	Local fauna	Notes	Images
Hemipsalodon	H. viejaensis	Porvenir	A hyainailourid.	
Hyaenodon	H. crucians	Porvenir	A hyaenodontid.	
Hyaenodon	H. cf. horridus	Little Egypt	A hyaenodontid.	
Hyaenodon	H. montanus	Porvenir	A hyaenodontid.	
Ischnognathus	I. savagei	Porvenir	A hyainailourid.	

==== Leptictida ====
Leptictids of the Chambers Tuff
Genus / Taxon	Species	Local fauna	Notes	Images
Leptictis	L. douglasi	Porvenir	A leptictid.	
Leptictis	L. wilsoni	Little Egypt	A leptictid.	

==== Perissodactyla ====
Perissodactyls of the Chambers Tuff
Genus / Taxon	Species	Local fauna	Notes	Images
Colodon	C. stovalli	Porvenir, Little Egypt	A helaletid (early tapir).	
Duchesneodus	D. uintensis	Porvenir	A large horned brontothere.	
Haplohippus	H. texanus	Porvenir	An early horse.	
Hyracodon	H. primus	Porvenir, Little Egypt	A hyracodontid (lightly-built, pony-like rhino).	
Metamynodon	M. chadronensis	Porvenir	An amynodontid (hippo-like rhino).	
Mesohippus	M. texanus	Porvenir, Little Egypt	An early three-toed horse.	
Penetrigonias	P. dakotensis	Porvenir	An early hornless rhinocerotid (rhino). Reports of Trigonias-like fossils probably represent this species.	
Protitanops	P. curryi	Porvenir, Little Egypt	A large horned brontothere. Texan fossils of this species were previously described under the dubious name "Menodus bakeri".	
Schizotheroides	S. jackwilsoni	Porvenir, Little Egypt	An enigmatic perissodactyl with teeth similar to hyracodontids.	
Subhyracodon?	S.? sp.	Porvenir	An early hornless rhinocerotid (rhino). Formerly known as Caenopus.	
Toxotherium	T. hunteri	Porvenir, Little Egypt	An enigmatic perissodactyl with a short, broad skull and rhino-like teeth.	

==== Primates ====
Primates of the Chambers Tuff
Genus / Taxon	Species	Local fauna	Notes	Images
Rooneyia	R. viejaensis	Porvenir	An omomyid (early tarsier relative)	

==== Rodentia ====
Rodents of the Chambers Tuff
Genus / Taxon	Species	Local fauna	Notes	Images
Adjidaumo	A. cf. A. minutus	Porvenir	An eomyid.	
Ardynomys	A. occidentalis	Porvenir, Little Egypt	A cylindrodontid.	
Aulolithomys	A. bounites	Porvenir	An eomyid.	
Aulolithomys	A. cf. A. bounites	Little Egypt	An eomyid.	
Cylindrodon	C. fontis	Little Egypt	A cylindrodontid.	
Dolocylindrodon	D. texanus	Porvenir, Little Egypt	A cylindrodontid. Previously considered a species of Pseudocylindrodon.	
Eutypomys	E. inexpectatus	Porvenir, Little Egypt	A eutypomyid.	
Ischyromys	I. blacki	Porvenir	An ischyromyine ischyromyid.	
Litoyoderimys	L. lustrorum	Porvenir	An eomyid. Previously considered a species of Yoderimys.	
Microparamys	M. perfossus	Porvenir	A paramyine ischyromyid.	
Pseudocylindrodon	P. neglectus	Porvenir, Little Egypt	A cylindrodontid.	
Pseudotomus	P. cf. P. petersoni	Porvenir	A paramyine ischyromyid. Previously considered a species of Ischyrotomus.	
Pseudotomus	P. johanniculi	Porvenir, Little Egypt	A paramyine ischyromyid. Previously considered a species of Manitsha.	
Quadratomus	Q. gigans	Porvenir	A paramyine ischyromyid. Previously considered a species of Leptotomus.	
cf. Simimys	cf. Simimys sp. indet.	Porvenir	A simimyid.	
Viejadjidaumo	V. magniscopuli	Porvenir	An eomyid.	

== See also ==
- List of fossiliferous stratigraphic units in Texas
- Paleontology in Texas
- Colmena Tuff
- Capote Mountain Tuff
