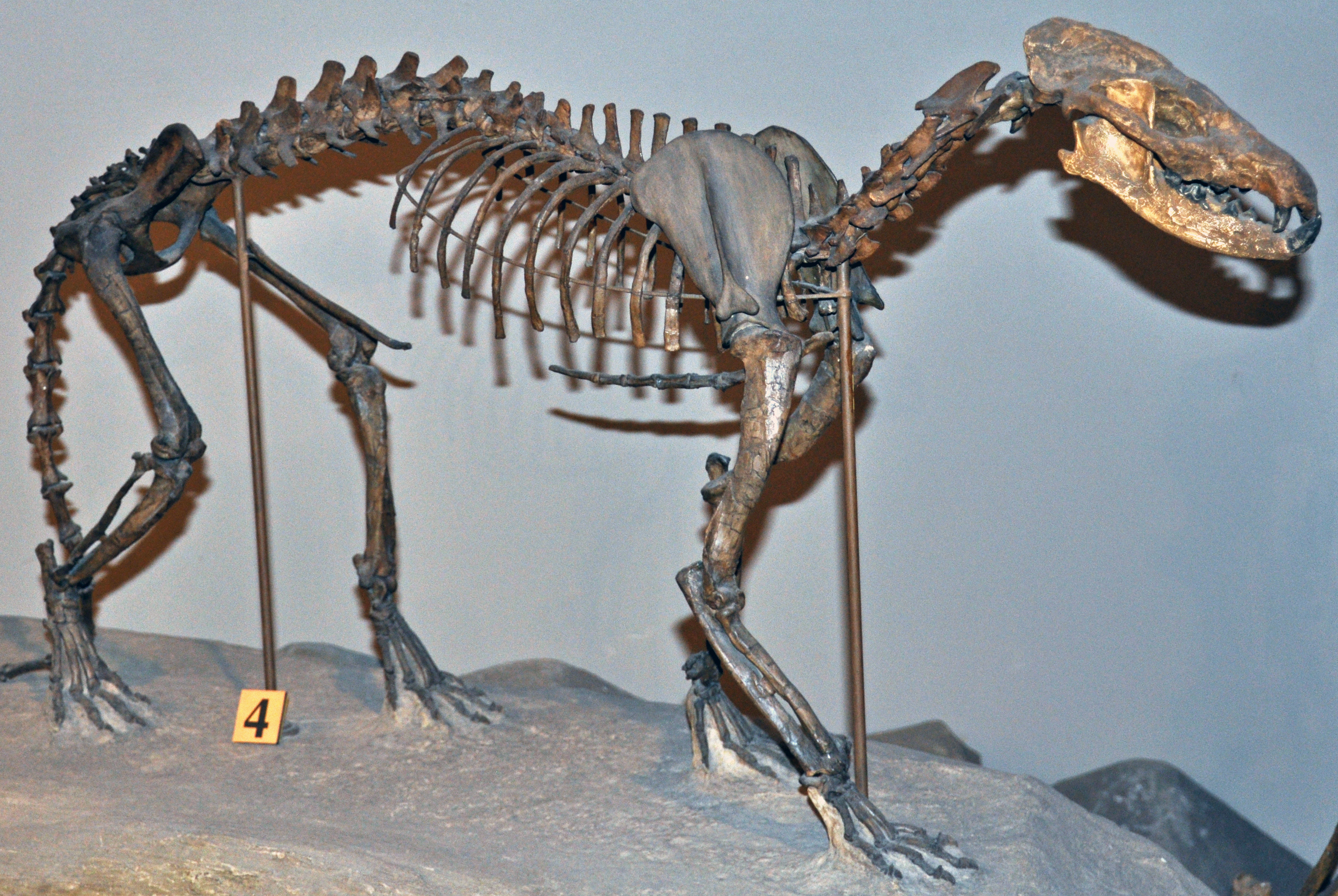
- D. vetus skeleton, Carnegie Museum of Natural History

Scientific classification
- Kingdom: Animalia
- Phylum: Chordata
- Class: Mammalia
- Order: Carnivora
- Family: †Amphicyonidae
- Subfamily: †Daphoeninae
- Genus: †Daphoenus; Leidy, 1853

Type species
- †Daphoenus vetus Leidy, 1853

Other species
- †D. demilo Dawson, 1980; †D. hartshorianus Cope, 1873; †D. lambei Russell, 1934; †D. ruber Stock, 1932; †D. socialis Thorpe, 1922; †D. transversus Wortman & Matthew, 1899

Synonyms
- Galecynus Cope, 1874; Pericyon Thorpe, 1922; Proamphicyon Hatcher, 1902

= Daphoenus =

Daphoenus Temporal range: 40–27 Ma Late Eocene-Early Oligocene

Extinct genus of carnivores

Daphoenus is an extinct genus of amphicyonids, a group colloquially known as "bear-dogs". It includes not just some of the best preserved material out of any amphicyonid, but also the earliest members of the family, first appearing in the middle Eocene and surviving into the Early Oligocene. The members of the genus are rather small compared to some of its later relatives, such as Amphicyon or Ysengrinia, ranging in size from comparable to a house cat to a small wolf. It was widely distributed across North America, with most of its remains being discovered in the White River Group of the Great Plains, though the John Day Beds of Oregon and the Cypress Hills Formation in Saskatchewan also represent important fossil sites. Other specimens have been described from localities in Texas, Georgia, Florida, and California.

== Taxonomy ==
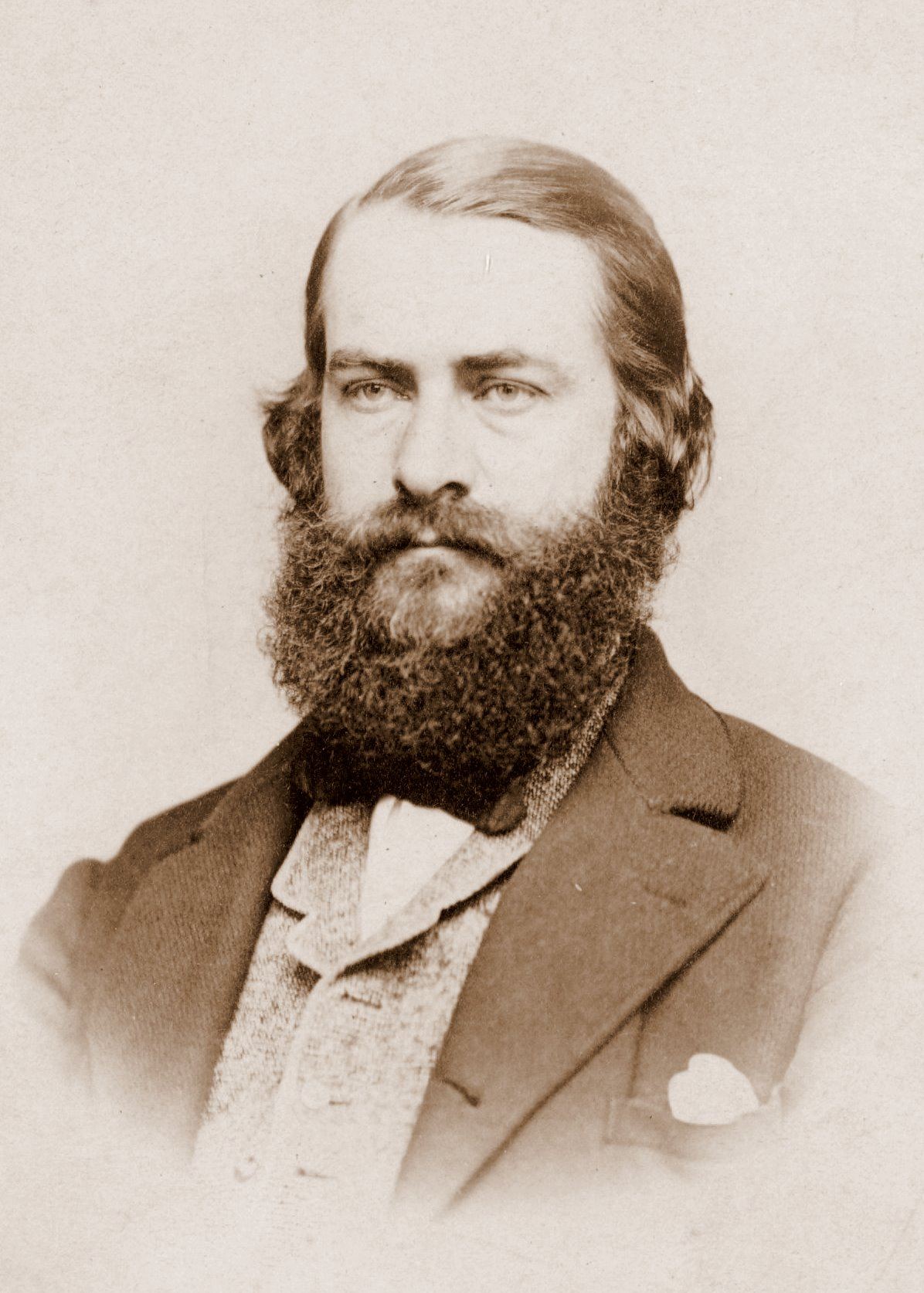
Portrait of Joseph Leidy, who first described Daphoenus in 1853

The first fossils of Daphoenus vetus were collected by John Evans in 1849, before they were described by Joseph Leidy in 1853, making them among the first White River mammals to be named. One year later, however, Leidy synonymized his newly erected genus with Amphicyon, though it was later resurrected by Scott in 1898. Hough considered their body shape to be more feline than canine. Two decades after the description of D. vetus, the smaller D. hartshornianus was named by Edward Drinker Cope on the basis of fossils he discovered in Cedar Creek, Colorado. Originally, the various species of the genus were considered to be primitive members of the Canidae. It is the most common genus of North American amphicyonids, with over sixty skulls, various rostra, and a number of postcranial skeletons having been discovered.

=== Evolution and classification ===
The origin of the amphicyonids is a highly debated topic, with their continent of origin remaining unresolved. This is partly a result of the plesiomorphic and homoplastic traits of early members of the family, as well as the poor fossil record of Middle Eocene Asia. As the genus Daphoenus includes the oldest known amphicyonid, the diminutive Daphoenus demilo from early Duchesnean Wyoming, it is integral to the understanding of the issue. The 2016 description of Angelarctocyon and Gustafsonia includes a review of the earliest Amphicyonidae, and a phylogenetic analysis that recovers Daphoenus as more derived than the aforementioned taxa, as well as the Eurasian Cynodictis. The authors also discuss the various proposals of the amphicyonid place of origin. They consider it unlikely that Europe was the cradle of their evolution, as their earliest securely dated appearance on the continent is Cynodictis lacustris from MP18 (~36-35 Ma). While Middle Eocene remains of Cynodoctis have been mentioned in faunal lists of the Lushi Basin and the Ulan Shireh Formation, which would make them the earliest known bear dogs, as well as a possible tooth of similar age from Myanmar, the validity of the assignment of these fossils to the Amphicyonidae could not be verified. Thus, the oldest known Asian occurrences of amphicyonids, belonging to Guangxicyon from China and an unnamed taxon from Mongolia, date to the Late Eocene and belong to animals more derived than both Angelarctocyon and Gustafsonia. Therefore, in the middle Eocene, amphicyonids are only known from North America, where they are represented by at least four different genera. This, in addition to the basal standing of A. australis and G. cognita in the phylogenetic analysis, supports a possible North American origin of the family. The lack of amphicyonid fossils from the late Uintan and early Duchesnean faunas west of the Rocky Mountains further supports this hypothesis, as they include some of the oldest known reports of other North American immigrants of Eurasian origin. Indeed, the earliest bear dogs are only known from the midst of the continent, rather than in high latitudes closer to Beringia. However, the position of the European Cynodictis as basal most amphicyonid in the consensus tree is puzzling, and may speak against a North American origin of the family.

The cladogram below follows the cladistic analysis of Tomiya & Tseng (2016).

- Carnivora
  - Oodectes herpestoides
  - Vulpavus profectus
  - Miacis parvivororus
  - Feliformia
  - Caniformia
    - "Miacis" cf. "M." sylvestris
    - - "Miacis" gracilis
      - - Amphicyonidae
          - Cynodictis spp.
          - - Gustafsonia cognita
            - - Angelarctocyon australis
              - - Paradaphoenus minimus
                - Daphoenus spp.
                - Brachyrhynchocyon dodgei
                - Daphoenictis tedfordi
        - - Lycophocyon hutchisoni
          - - Canidae
            - Arctoidea

Both the dental features and skull morphology of the earliest Daphoenus are reminiscent of Cynodictis, indicating a common origin between the two genera, though it differs from its European relative in the presence of a "closed" trigonid, the first two molars being rather robust, and the fact that its third molars are merely reduced, not absent. It is likely that Daphoenus was ancestral to the later daphoenines of North America, such as Daphoenictis, Paradaphoenus, and Daphoenodon, whereas Cynodictis gave rise to the diversity of Old World bear dogs. The daphoenines were a likely monophyletic group endemic to North America, and ranged from the middle Eocene to early Miocene epoch. Originally considered to be canids, Hough raised them to family status in 1948, including genera such as Amphicyon, evidently being unaware that Schlosser had created the family Amphicyonidae in 1888, before Hunt demoted them back to subfamily status in 1974, though as amphicyonids, rather than canids. Daphoenus was also closely related to Brachyrhynchocyon, and the later members of the genus, such as D. vetus & D. hartshornianus, probably descend from the early D. lambei.

=== Species ===
==== D. demilo ====
Described by Dawson on the basis of a jaw, a fragmentary maxilla and jaw fragment, this small, slender-jawed species was discovered at the Wood locality 20 and locality 20 of the Badwater Creek area in central Wyoming. It is more primitive than other species of the genus, as shown by the well-developed buccal shelf on its M1, a feature typical of miacids, as well as the less open trigonid of M1 and the greater development of the paraconid on M2. Furthermore, the gaps between its anterior premolars is smaller than in later members of Daphoenus. It dates to the early Duchesnean, making it the oldest known amphicyonid, with the Badwater 20 locality dating to ~40 Ma. A tooth possibly referable to this species is also known from the Lac Pelletier Lower Fauna of the Cypress Hills Formation in Saskatchewan. Hunt considers it to be conspecific with D. lambei.

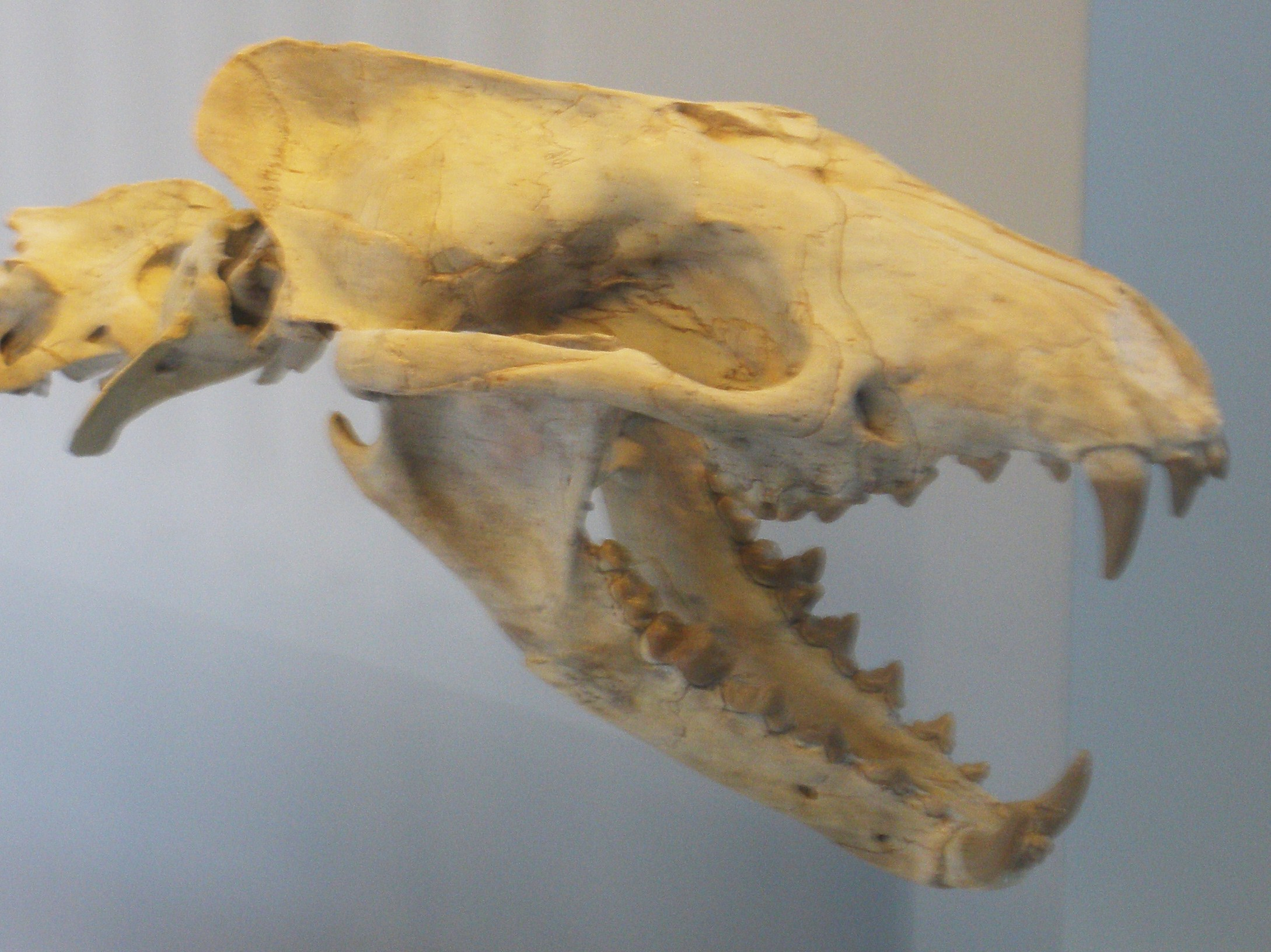
D. vetus skull, Paleontology Museum of Zurich

==== D. vetus ====
This is the most well-known species of the genus, being widely distributed across the White River faunas from ~36-35 Ma to 28.4 Ma, with the lineage continuing into the Whitneyan, where it is known from the Protoceras channels of South Dakota, represented by a form larger than the Orellan D. vetus, but smaller than the terminal Great Plains species. It is similar in size to a coyote, with a skull length of 17–20 cm.

==== D. hartshornianus ====
In the White River Group, D. vetus coexisted with D. hartshornianus, a much smaller relative that reached perhaps 11 kg, and had a skull length of 14–16 cm. It was common throughout the Orellan, from ~36-35 Ma to ~32-30 Ma.

==== D. lambei ====
This species is even smaller than D. hartshornianus, from which it also differs in its prominent deuterocone and well-developed cingulum. It is known from the Conglomerate Creek and Calf Creek valleys of the Cypress Hills Formation, Chadronian, Saskatchewan, and possibly the Texan Porvenir Local Fauna in the lower part of the Chambers Formation. Both of these localities date to the Chadronian. Hunt suggests that D. demilio might be a junior synonym of D. lambei, which would make the latter the oldest amphicyonid known.

==== D. ruber ====
Discovered in the Tecuya beds of California, this species was described by Stock on the basis of a fragmentary left ramus. It is slightly smaller than D. vetus, and the original author suggested that it might prove to be a connecting link between early Daphoenus and D. socialis. Hunt does not mention the species in his review of North American amphicyonids, but agrees with the referral of the Tecuya specimem to Daphoenus.

==== D. transversus ====
This species from the John Day beds is quite similar to D. hartshornianus, and its holotype was initially even assigned to the latter species. However, in 1899 Wortman and Matthew created Paradaphoenus transversus on the basis of the holotype rostrum, though later authors do not follow the assignment to this genus. Even though it is similar to D. hartshornianus in its size, frontal inflation less pronounced than in D. vetus, and a narrow snout, it differs in its more sectorial dentition, which is reminiscent of Oligocene canids. The dating of the fossils from the John Day beds is difficult, as the localities where many of them were discovered have been lost.

==== D. socialis ====
Whereas D. tranversus occupies a similar morphospace as D. hartshornianus, D. socialis is more similar to D. vetus in its larger size, broader snout, and inflated frontal region, though it also deviates from its Great Plains relative in its dentition. It was originally described as Pericyon socialis by Thorpe, on the basis of a specimen from the Haystack valley area of the John Day beds. In addition to fragmentary remains, and several isolated teeth, it is also known from a partial cranium (YPM 10064).

==== Undescribed species ====
In addition to the mentioned species, Daphoenus also includes two as of yet undescribed forms. Both of them are among the last and largest members of the genus. The first is known from a single cranium, discovered in the uppermost White River Group of Wildcat Ridge, located in western Nebraska, dating to 28.6 Ma, with a 24 cm long skull. Furthermore, a large maxilla with unusually big teeth (JODA 1411) is known from Fremd's Unit C from the Blue Basin, correlating with the earliest Arikareean, indicating that a third species of Daphoenus was present in the John Day beds. A review of carnivorans from John Day suggests that the size of the latter specimen is in line with other members of the gens Daphoenus, and that it rather was discovered in unit E2, which is higher in the basin.

== Description ==
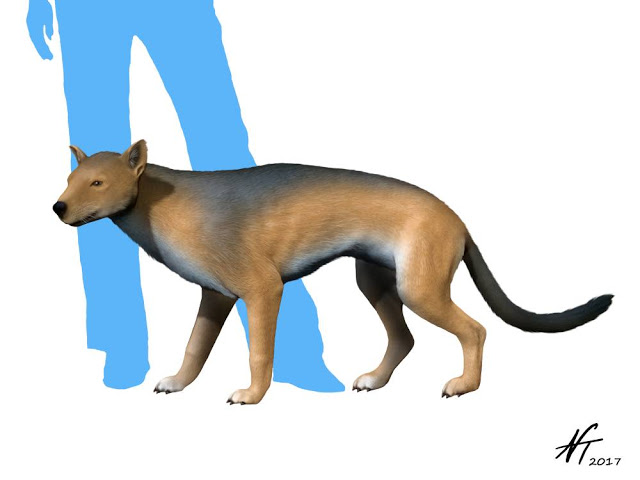
Restoration of D. vetus

Daphoenus was a plesiomorphic, rather unspecialized early member of the amphicyonids. This genus varied greatly in size, though it was much smaller than many other bear dogs, with the earliest members being among the smallest known members of the family, reaching the size of a house cat (2–4 kg), while the common D. vetus was a coyote-sized, and the terminal species approaching a small wolf in size (20–30 kg).

It is characterized through a dolichocephalic skull, with a long snout, and narrow, elongated premolars, which increase in size posteriorily. Whereas in other amphicyonids the first upper molar as well as the premolars tend to be reduced, while the second and third molar form are enlarged to form a crushing platform, this is not the case among daphoenines. Daphoenus possessed generally unspecialized teeth, their shearing molars had a plesiomorphic pattern, as indicated by the prominent tricuspid trigonid with well-developed paraconid-protoconid shear and a distinct metaconid. Daphoenus tooth formula was $\frac{3.1.4.3.}{3.1.4.3.}$. As with its teeth, the auditory bulla was among the most plesiomorphic of all amphicyonids, similar to Cynodictis and the modern African palm civet.

The postcranial skeleton of Daphoenus was gracile, with an anatomy possibly suggesting a scansorial animal, and even the earliest members of the genus show subcursorial adaptions, possessing a paraxonic digitigrade to subdigitigrade gate and the ability to evert and invert their hindfoot. Footprints belonging to the ichnogenus Axiciapes were most likely made by Daphoenus. If these animals were digitigrade, as indicated by their anatomy, suggests that their front feet possessed thick digital pads or semi-retractible claws as only the tips of their claws are preserved in the footprints. the tracks of their hind feet are puzzling, as no trace of their first digit is visible. This only supports the fact that their weight was spread unequally on its outer side, with digit I possibly being held clear of the ground while walking.

== Paleobiology ==
Daphoenus was a sexually dimorphic taxon, with the males being larger, and possessing a more robust rostrum and canines than the gracile females. Similar differences can be observed in a variety of other amphicyonid taxa, such as Amphicyon, Ysengrinia, and Daphoenodon. However, fossils of male Daphoenus vetus are remarkable for the presence of enormous bone spurs, which developed on both sides on the inner edge of its distal radii, and increase in size with age. These exostes are not pathological, but a bilateral development of normal bone, though they grow so large in size that they may have fractured or impeded the animals movement. So far, this feature is only known from this species, though this may be a result of the scarce postcranial remains known from males of the other members of the genus. The lesions are bilaterally symmetrical, and hang slightly downwards. Out of nine Daphoenus fossils surveyed by Romer, seven of them (78%) possessed such tumours, leading him to suggest that they were caused by 'local stimulation', and present an adaption to strengthen the muscles by increasing the distance between the point of insertion and the point of application of the force. However, unbeknownst to him, some specimens developed multiple Osteochondromas, including on the vertebral body. Similar tumours have also been discovered on the radii of Cynodictis and the basal canid Hesperocyon.

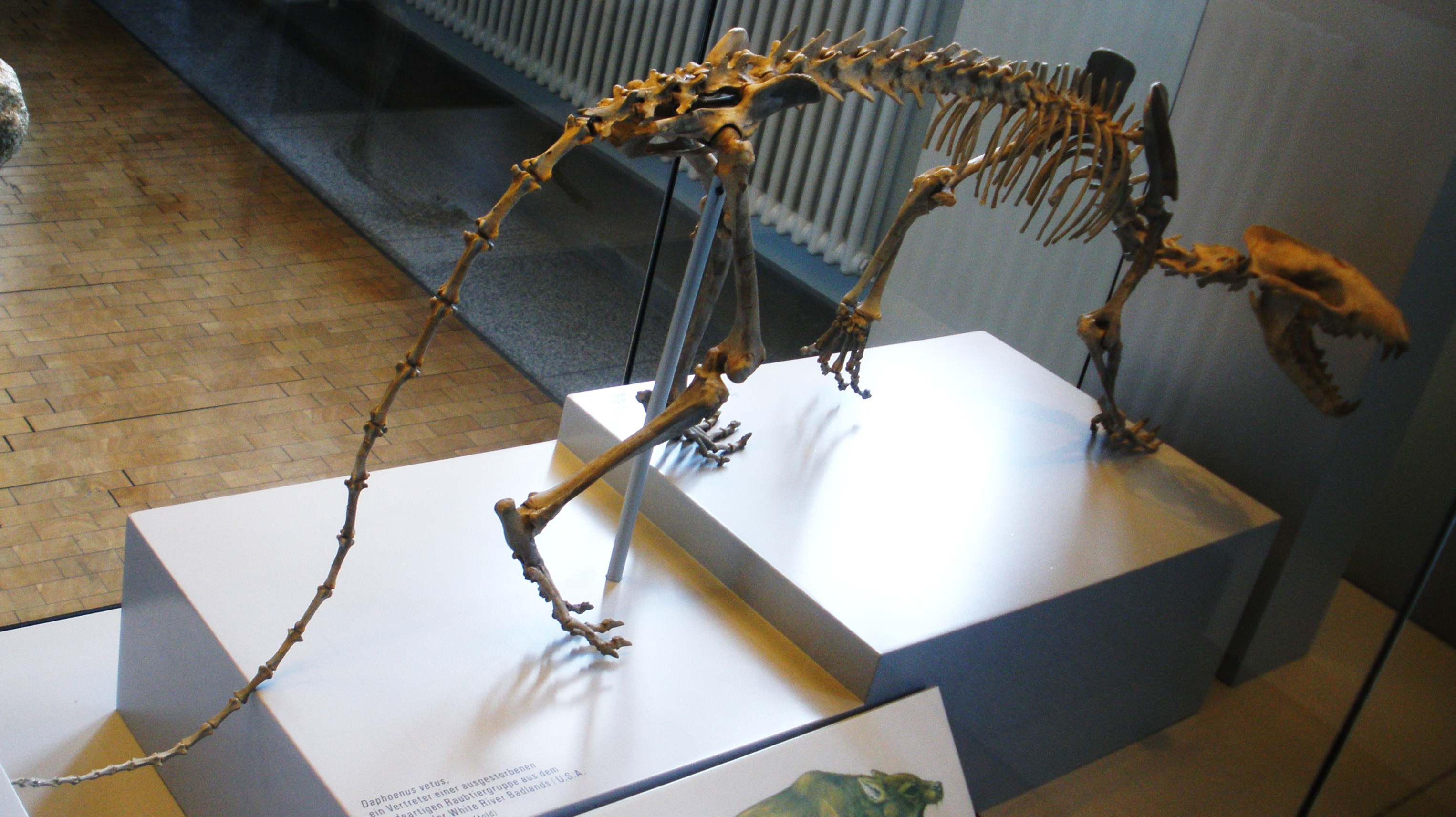
D. vetus skeleton, Paleontology Museum of Zurich

The volume of the endocast of D. hartshornianus is 56 cm^{3}, with an Encephalization quotient of 0.64, putting it near the bottom of amphicyonid EQ ranges, considerably lower than the likes of Cynelos rugidens and Daphoenodon superbus, with EQs of 0.82 and 0.97, respectively, though greater than in earlier 'miacid' carnivoramorphs. It possesses an arched neocortex, and therefore a sharp angle between the two branches of the rhinal sulcus. The ectomarginal sulcus is developed more strongly than in Gustafsonia, and is a common feature among amphicyonids, but not present in many other carnivorans, with the exception of canids. A further feature unique to the amphicyonids, and a few canids, is a notch at the caudal border of the temporal lobe. It did not possess a cruciate sulcus.

Due to its unspecialized teeth, Daphoenus has been recovered as omnivore, with one study suggesting that no food item dominated, but small mammals, hard-shelled invertebrates, and fruits were consumed frequently, indicating that their diet was similar to modern binturongs and golden jackals. Orellan coprolites, which include the remains of didelphimorphs, camelids, canids, lagomorphs, oreodonts, leptomerycids, and hypertragulids have been discovered, and were likely produced by a predator similar in size and diet to a coyote, presumably Daphoenus vetus. Daphoenus is recovered within the meat/non-vertebrate group by another study, which includes species whose diet includes 50-70% meat, though they supplement their diet with plants and invertebrates.

== Paleoecology ==
=== Eocene ===
The Duchesnean can be seen as a time of transition between the Uintan and the Chadronian. It is associated with a sharp drop of temperature of perhaps 10 °C in the mid-latitudes of North America by circa 40 Ma, with evidence of similar cooling being found from all across the globe. The mid-Duchesnean transition (38-37 Ma) saw a further major global fauna change, which mostly hit warm-adapted and tropical taxa, and the replacement of the Uintan-early Duchesnean fauna by the early White River chronofauna. Although the Uintan had seen a great diversity of 'miacid' stem-carnivoramophs, most of these went extinct between 42 and 40 Ma, with only the aberrantly large species Miocyon magnus being known to survive into the Duchesnean. They were replaced by more derived crow-group carnivorans, such as Daphoenus and the earliest canid Hesperocyon, both of which first appear in this epoch. Among the larger predators, the archaic oxyaenids also disappear after the Uintan, whereas the last mesonychians survive into the Duchesnean, which also saw the first appearance of nimravids like Pangurban in North America, showing a major restructuring of the continent's carnivore guild. At the same time, the diversity of primates declined, as the diversity of selenodont artiodactyls increased, possibly associated with a shift towards more open habitats.

Distribution of Daphoenus fossils in North America based on Hunt (1998) and Paleobiology Database. Duchesnean Chadronian, Orellan Whitneyan and Arikareean

Badwater Locality 20, where the oldest known fossils of Daphoenodus demilo were discovered, is notable for its diverse assemblage of microvertebrates, similar to the one seen in modern rainforest biomes. These include various rodents from the families Ischyromyidae, Eomyidae, Sciuravidae and Cylindrodontidae, a variety of insectivores, the marsupial relative Herpethotherium, and the multituberculate Ectypodus. Notable are the remains of early bats, and the omomyid primate Walshina. Larger mammals are represented by the leptomerycid Hendryomeryx, the agriochoerid Diplobunops, the protoceratids Leptotragulus and Poabromylus, and possibly the bronothere Telmatherium.

By the late Duchesnean, at least four genera of amphicyonids (Angelarctocyon, Daphoenictis, Daphoenus, and Gustafsonia) were distributed across North America, and two more (Brachyrhynchocyon and Daphoenocyon) appear during the following epoch. Other carnivorans that make their first appearance in North America during this epoch are the subparictids and mustelids. Early Chadronian representatives of Daphoenus are small, similar to the Duchesnean ones, but they increase in size throughout the period, reaching the size of a coyote, with the ones from the end of the epoch being morphologically more similar to the ones from the following Orellan. However, they coexisted with massive hyaenodonts belonging to the genera Hyaenodon and Hemipsalodon, and early nimravids, a group of cat-like carnivorans, some of which possessed sabertooths, both of which dwarfed the early amphicyonids. This association of hyaenodonts, nimravids and daphoenines would continue to dominate the carnivoran fauna of North America until the early Arikareean, when all three disappear in rapid succession.

A typical Chadronian locality was the Calf Creek Local Fauna, where Daphoenus coexisted with a variety of small mammals, among them Herpethotherium, Apatemys, and Leptictis. Other carnivorans present at the site include Hesperocyon, Parictis, and possibly the nimravids Dinictis and Hoplophoneus. Hyaenodonts are represented by Hemipsalodon, and two species of Hyaenodon, the large H. horridus and the smaller H. microdon. Ungulates are represented by a wide variety of genera, including the equid Mesohippus, the hornless rhinoceros-relative Hyracodon, the camelid Poebrotherium, the anthracothere Bothriodon, several leptomerycids and protoceratids, and the oreodont Merycoidodon. The brontothere Megacerops and entelodont Archaeotherium were among the largest mammals present. By this point, Daphoenus had spread as far as Georgia, where it was discovered in the Hardie Mine, dating to 36–34.2 Ma.

=== Oligocene ===
The Eocene-Oligocene transition and earliest Oligocene saw yet another notable drop in temperature, with the first ice sheets forming in Antarctica, a global decrease of temperatures by possibly 5-6 °C, and the extinction of many marine invertebrates. In North America, it is associated with the replacement of paratropical floras by broadleaved deciduous forests across large parts of the continent, the transformation of dry woodland to open grasslands in the Big Badlands, and the disappearance of amphibious herpetofauna across large parts of the western United States. The paleosols of White River group also show the replacement of dense woodlands, with annual precipitation of over 1000 mm, with more arid, open woodland-grassland mosaics, that received less than half that amount of rainfall. Despite this, the mammal associations of the continent saw only minor changes, most notably the extinction of Hemipsalodon, the brontotheres, oromerycids, and cylindrodont rodents, unlike in Europe, where the Grande Coupure transformed the mammalian fauna. Among daphoenines, Daphoenictis and Brachyrhynchocyon become extinct at the end of the Chadronian, whereas Paradaphoenus first appears in the Orellan.

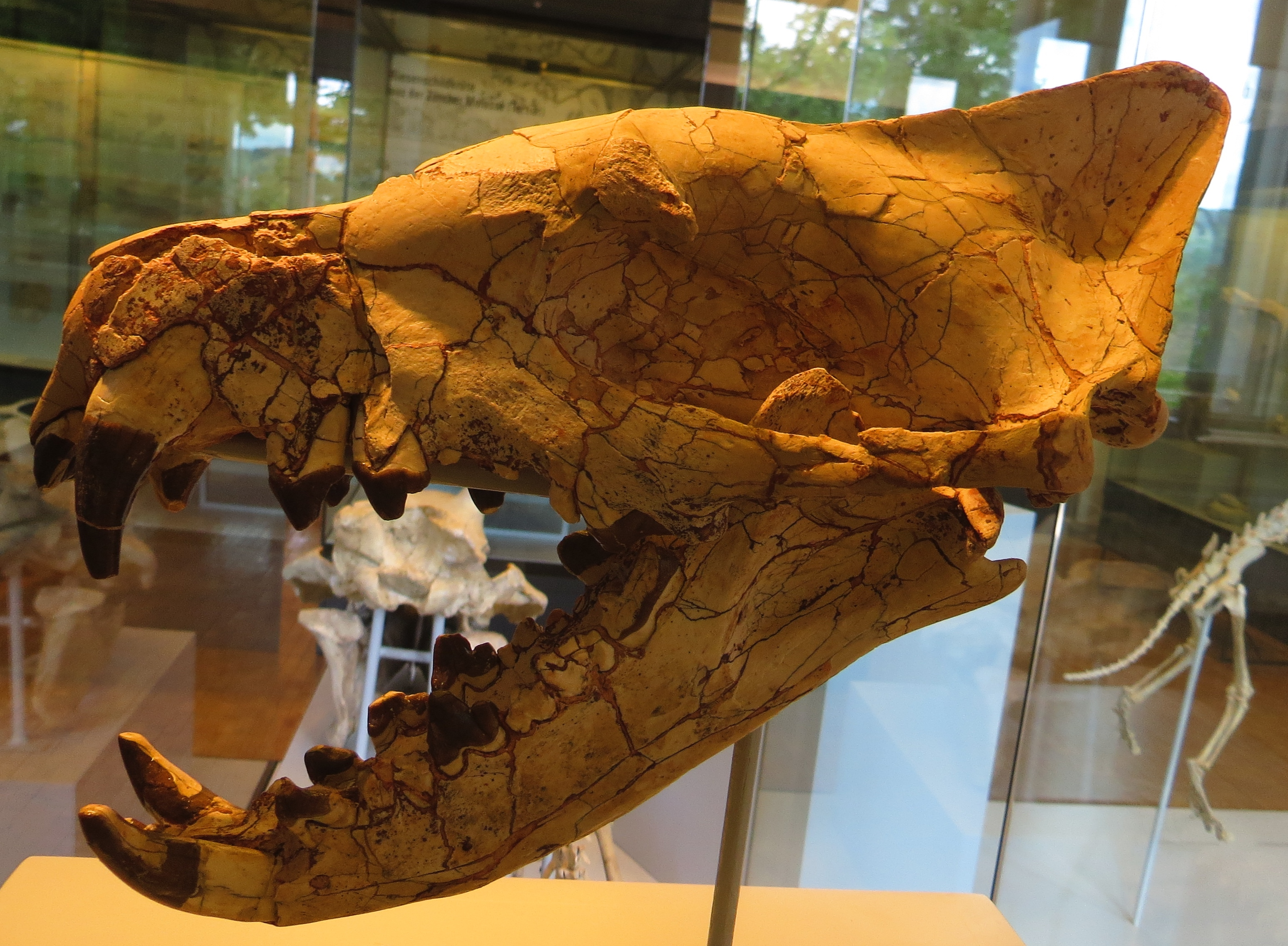
Skull of Hyaenodon horridus, which coexisted with Daphoenus throughout the Eocene and Oligocene epochs

In the White River faunas of the Orellan, D. vetus and D. hartshornianus coexisted, and likely avoided competition due to size difference, despite their similar morphology. Other survivors from the late Eocene carnivoran assemblage include Hyaenodon, Hesperocyon, Dinictis, and Hoplophoneus, whereas the canid Osbornodon newly emerged during this epoch. Common herbivores include the equids Mesohippus and Miohippus, the tapir Colodon, Archaeotherium, Poebrotherium and Paratylopus among the camelids, and a variety of rhinoceros relatives and oreodonts. An analysis of the trophic diversity of Orellan carnivorans recovers both White River species of Daphoenus as well as the early canid Mesocyon as mesocarnivores, whereas the large nimravids and Hyaenodon were found to be hypercarnivores.

Whitneyan fossils of this genus were discovered at the locality I-75 in Florida. The most abundant mammal of the site was the artiodactyl Leptomeryx, though it also lived alongside the equid Miohippus, a tayassuid, and two small oreodonts. Among the smaller mammals of the site are the marsupial Herpetotherium, the lagomorph Palaeolagus, four rodents, including the beaver like Eutypomys, the insectivorous Centetodon, and at least seven species of bats, including Koopmanycteris and two species of Speonycteris. The only other carnivoran known from the site is the small mustelid Palaeogale. The locality also preserves amphibians, the lizard Peltosaurus and an assemblage of at least nine boid and colubrid snakes.

The early Arikareean saw the disappearance of the genus Daphoenus from the Great Plains around 28.6 Ma, though they survived somewhat longer in the Pacific Northwest, until perhaps ~27 Ma, with their range in the John Day Beds extending into unit K2, which dates between 27.18 ± 0.13 and 25.9 ± 0.3 Ma. This coincides with the local extinction of hyaenodonts and nimravids around 28 Ma and ~25 Ma, respectively. This epoch also saw the emergence of the temnocyonine amphicyonids, in form of Temnocyon altigenis, the oldest fossil of which has been dated to ~29.3 Ma. This taxon was not unlike Daphoenus in terms of size and its plesiomorphic dentition. The extinction of the omnivorous Daphoenus, and the hypercarnivorous Hyaenodon and nimravids, meant that the mdidle Arikareean was characterized by a rather impoverished carnivoran assemblage, possessing less diversity of feeding morphologies, dominated by temnocyonines, several species of which developed durophagous and cursorial adaptions, and the huge, omnivorous Daeodon. However, Daphoenus is considered to be the probable of the early Miocene Daphoenodon, which would suggest that it survived past the early Arikareean, even though the two genera are separated by several million years.
