= Daphoenictis =

Daphoenictis Temporal range: Late Eocene (late Duchesnean - Chadronian)

Scientific classification
- Kingdom: Animalia
- Phylum: Chordata
- Class: Mammalia
- Order: Carnivora
- Family: †Amphicyonidae
- Subfamily: †Daphoeninae
- Genus: †Daphoenictis; Hunt, 1974

Type species
- Daphoenictis tedfordi Hunt, 1974

Extinct genus of carnivorans

Daphoenictis is an extinct genus of amphicyonid ("bear-dog") from the Late Eocene of North America, about 38-34 million years ago. It is known from a single species, Daphoenictis tedfordi. Daphoenictis was a member of the subfamily Daphoeninae and probably had cat-like proportions, though only the teeth and skull fragments have been described. Daphoenictis is a rare predator in the Chadronian portion of the White River fauna of the Northern Great Plains. It is also known from the Chambers Tuff of Texas and the Cypress Hills Formation of Saskatchewan.

Daphoenictis was rather small, with a maximum skull length of 12 cm (4.7 in). Compared to other daphoenines, it was better-adapted for shearing meat, with narrower premolars and molars. The lower premolars have small additional cusps on their blades, granting a leaf-shaped profile. The lower molars are also blade-like, though this was achieved by reducing the metaconid (inner cusp) and talonid (rear crushing "heel" of each molar).
