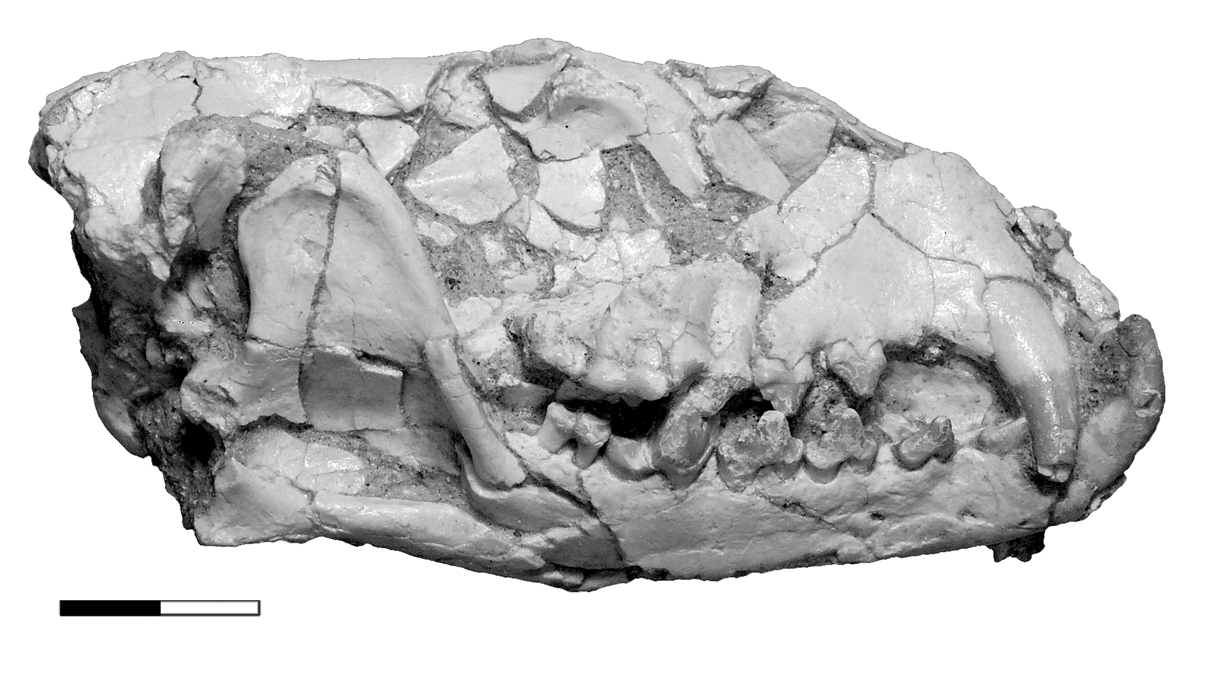
- Skull

Scientific classification
- Kingdom: Animalia
- Phylum: Chordata
- Class: Mammalia
- Order: Carnivora
- Suborder: Caniformia
- Genus: †Lycophocyon; Tomiya, 2011
- Species: †L. hutchisoni

Binomial name
- †Lycophocyon hutchisoni Tomiya, 2011

= Lycophocyon =

Lycophocyon Temporal range: Middle Eocene, 43–40 Ma

Extinct genus of carnivores

Lycophocyon is an extinct genus of caniformian carnivoran from Middle Eocene (early Duchesnean and possibly late Uintan NALMA) deposits of San Diego County, California. Lycophocyon is known from the holotype UCMP 85202, a partial left and right dentary. Paratypes include UCMP 170713, SDSNH 107658, SDSNH 107659, SDSNH 107442, SDSNH 107443 and SDSNH 107444, partial dentaries, mandibles and other cranial remains, and SDSNH 107446 and SDSNH 107447, cranial and postcranial fragments. Many additional specimens are also known. All specimens were collected from numerous localities, all of them from the upper portions of "member C" of the Santiago Formation. It was first named by Susumu Tomiya in 2011 and the type species is Lycophocyon hutchisoni. The generic name means "twilight dog" in Greek, in references to its occurrence on the west coast of North America, and its affinity to the Caniformia. The specific name honours the paleontologist J. Howard Hutchison.

== Phylogeny ==
The cladogram below follows the topology from a 2011 analysis by Susumu Tomiya.

- Caniformia
  - Amphicyonidae
    - "Miacis" cognitus
    - Daphoenus
  - - Lycophocyon hutchisoni
    - Canoidea
      - Canidae
        - Hesperocyon
        - Otarocyon
      - Arctoidea
        - Mustelavus
        - Pseudobassaris
        - - Amphicticeps
          - - Plesictis
            - Broiliana
