= Aclistomycter =

Aclistomycter Temporal range: 38–37 Ma Late Eocene (late Duchesnean – earliest Chadronian)

Scientific classification
- Kingdom: Animalia
- Phylum: Chordata
- Class: Mammalia
- Infraclass: Placentalia
- Order: Artiodactyla
- Family: †Merycoidodontidae
- Subfamily: †Aclistomycterinae; Lander, 1998
- Genus: †Aclistomycter; Wilson, 1971

Type species
- Aclistomycter middletoni Wilson, 1971

Other species
- Aclistomycter? dunagani (Wilson, 1971)

Extinct genus of mammals

Aclistomycter is an extinct genus of oreodont from the late Eocene of Texas and Mexico. It is the oldest known member of Merycoidodontidae (the family containing most oreodonts), and its distinctive qualities allow it to occupy its own monotypic subfamily, Aclistomycterinae. Aclistomycter was a small herbivorous artiodactyl with a short face and small, tusk-like canine teeth. Though small by the standards of Oligocene-Miocene oreodonts, it was somewhat larger than other late Eocene oreodonts.

The type species Aclistomycter middletoni was first reported from the Porvenir local fauna in the Chambers Tuff Formation, near Adobe Springs in Presidio County, Texas. This site is late Duchesnean in age (about 38 Ma). It has also been reported from the Rancho Gaitan site in Chihuahua, Mexico. A second potential species, Aclistomycter? dunagani, occurs in the nearby Little Egypt local fauna, which is slightly younger (earliest Chadronian, about 37 Ma).

== Diagnosis ==
The type specimen consists of a skull and jaws.

Generic characters assigned by Wilson (1971):

- Medium-small merycoidodontid with a very large and deep, probably perforated, antorbital fossae (a depression in front of the eyes).
- Brachycephalic (with a short, broad snout)
- Posterior part of skull extended.
- Molar teeth with thick enamel and deep fossettes.
- Posterior base of zygomatic processes wide, making the skull broad posteriorly.
- Bullae thought to be inflated (though the bullae are not exposed in the figures of the type specimen illustrated by Wilson).
