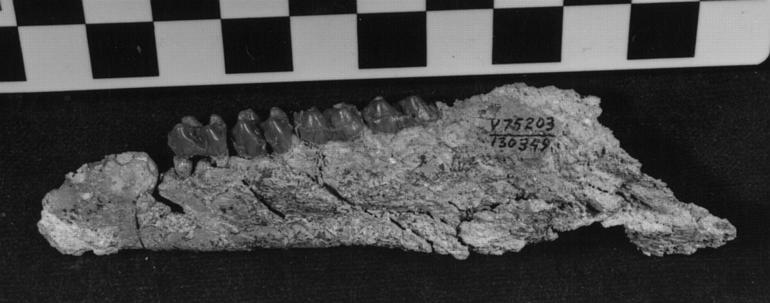

Scientific classification
- Domain: Eukaryota
- Kingdom: Animalia
- Phylum: Chordata
- Class: Mammalia
- Order: Perissodactyla
- Family: Equidae
- Genus: †Haplohippus; McGrew 1953

Species
- Haplohippus texanus

= Haplohippus =

Haplohippus Temporal range: 42.–38.0 Ma Duchesnean

Extinct genus of mammals

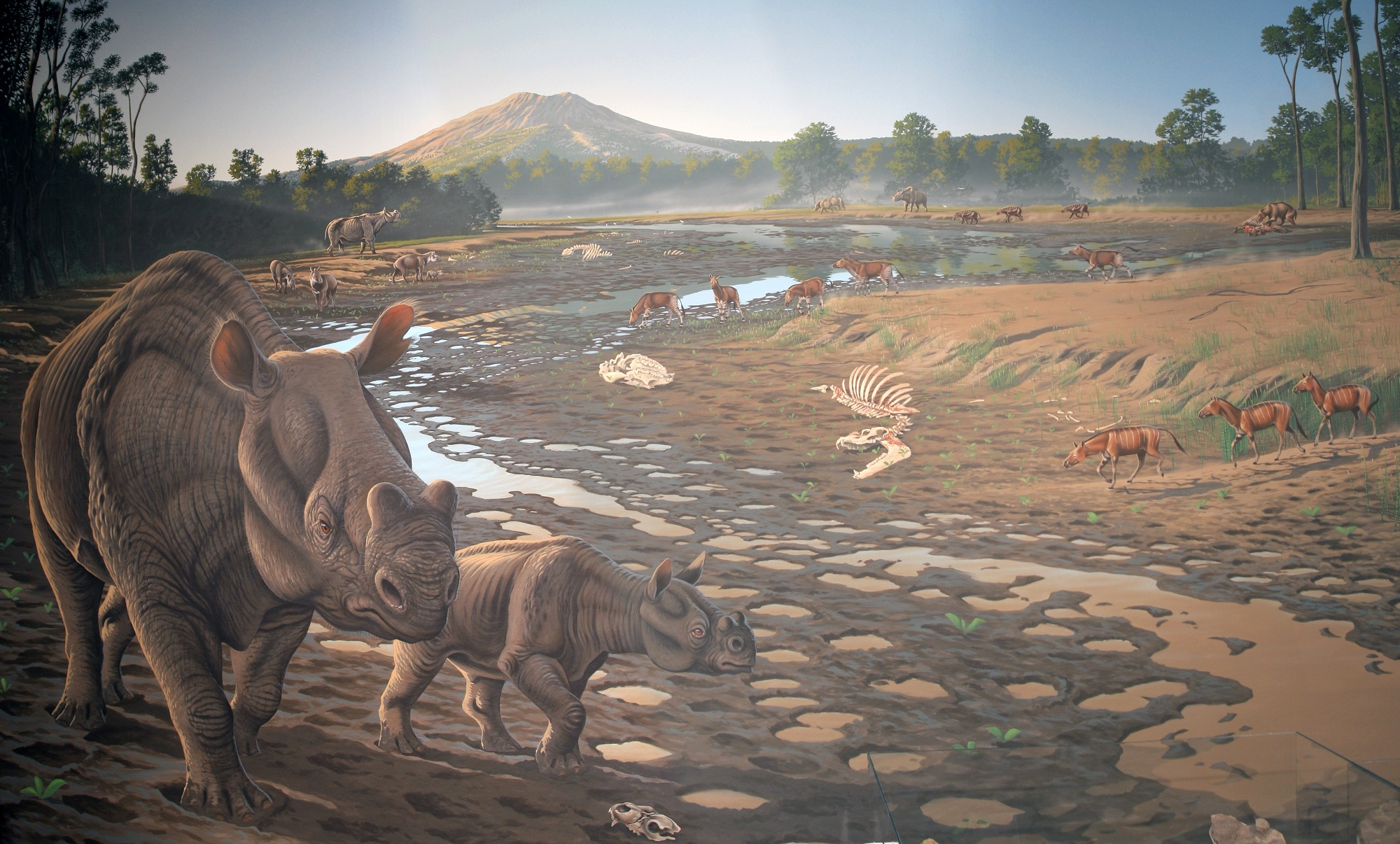
Restoration of Haplohippus (middle right) and other animals of the Hancock Mammal Quarry

Haplohippus is an extinct genus of the modern horse family Equidae, that lived in the Eocene, from 42 to 38 million years ago. Fossil remains of Haplohippus have been found in the Clarno Formation, part of the John Day Fossil Beds National Monument of the Northwestern United States. While Haplohippus is quite similar to Orohippus, it is considered more primitive in character than Epihippus.
