= Chadronian =

North American faunal stage

The Chadronian is a North American Land Mammal Age typically set from around 37,000,000 to 33,700,000 years BP, a period of 3.3 million years. The Chadronian is preceded by the Duchesnean and followed by the Orellan NALMA stages. Relative to global geological chronology (the geologic time scale), it is usually considered to fall within the later part (Priabonian stage) of the Eocene epoch, ending around the same time as the Eocene-Oligocene boundary.

The Chadronian is named after the Chadron Formation, a widespread component of the White River Group in Nebraska and South Dakota. The most well-studied examples of Chadronian strata in the White River Group/Formation are the Flagstaff Rim area of eastern Wyoming and the Toadstool Park area of northwest Nebraska.

The beginning of the Chadronian is defined by the first appearance of Bathygenys (a merycoidodontid, or "oreodont"). Other mammals which first appear at the start of the stage include Merycoidodon dunagani (a merycoidodontid), Brachyrhynchocyon dodgei, (a daphoenine amphicyonid, or "bear dog"), and Archaeotherium (an entelodont). The early horse Mesohippus appears only slightly before the start of the Chadronian.

== Subdivisions ==
Four subdivisions of the Chadronian were informally proposed by Prothero and Emry (1996), later formalized by the same authors in 2004. Type assemblages (diagnostic fossil faunas used to define the subdivision) are bolded and underlined. From youngest to oldest:

**Subdivision**	**Primary index fossil**	**Estimated age**	**Component assemblages**
Late Chadronian (Chadronian 4)	Miniochoerus chadronensis	33.7 - 34.7 Ma	**upper Flagstaff Rim, White River Formation** (around ash J) (Wyoming); Upper Chadron Formation (Nebraska); Peanut Peak Member, Chadron Formation (South Dakota); Florissant Formation (Colorado); Ash Springs local fauna, Vieja Group (Texas)
Middle Chadronian (Chadronian 3)	Leptomeryx mammifer	34.7 - 35.7 Ma	**middle Flagstaff Rim, White River Formation** (around ashes B-G) (Wyoming); Pipestone Springs and Little Pipestone Creek local faunas, Renova Formation (Montana); Raben Ranch local fauna, Chadron Formation (Nebraska); Crazy Johnson Member, Chadron Formation (South Dakota)
Late Early Chadronian (Chadronian 2)	Leptomeryx yoderi	35.7 - 36.5 Ma	**lower Flagstaff Rim, White River Formation** (around ash A) (Wyoming); Yoder local fauna, White River Formation (Wyoming); Pipestone Springs local fauna, Renova Formation (Montana); McCarty's Mountain local fauna (Montana); Ahearn Member, Chadron Formation (South Dakota); Medicine Pole Hills local fauna (North Dakota); Airstrip local fauna, Capote Mountain Tuff (Texas)
Earliest Chadronian (Chadronian 1)	Bathygenys	36.5 - 37 Ma	**Little Egypt local fauna, upper Chambers Tuff (Texas)**; Rancho Gaitan local fauna, Preitos Formation (Chihuahua, Mexico); lowermost Flagstaff Rim, White River Formation? (Wyoming); Pipestone Springs local fauna, Renova Formation (Montana); Diamond O Ranch local fauna, Renova Formation? (Montana)

Part of the Cypress Hills Formation (Saskatchewan, Canada) is also considered to be Chadronian in age. The Black Butte High site in the Gravelly Range of Montana is probably Chadronian in age. In Colorado, Chadronian mammal faunas are found in the Florissant Formation, the Antero Formation, and the White River Formation in the Kings Canyon area. In New Mexico, the Conejos, Espinaso, Spears, Sanders Canyon, Bell Top, upper Rubio Peak, and upper Palm Park formations all overlap with the Chadronian NALMA. The Iniyoo local fauna (Oaxaca, Mexico) was initially reported to be Chadronian, though revised dating suggests that it is Arikareean (late Oligocene) instead.
