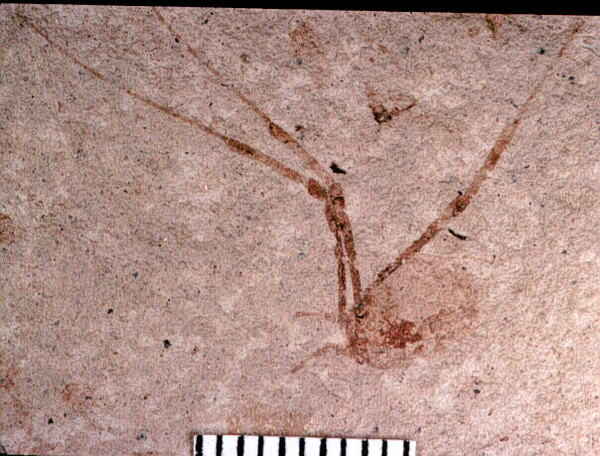
- holotype adult

Scientific classification
- Domain: Eukaryota
- Kingdom: Animalia
- Phylum: Arthropoda
- Subphylum: Chelicerata
- Class: Arachnida
- Order: Opiliones
- Family: Sclerosomatidae
- Subfamily: Leiobuninae
- Genus: †Amauropilio; Mello-Leitão, 1937

= Amauropilio =

Amauropilio Temporal range: Chadronian

Genus of harvestmen/daddy longlegs

Amauropilio is an extinct genus of harvestmen in the family Sclerosomatidae. It is known from the Chadronian aged Florissant Formation in Colorado.

== Species ==
- Amauropilio atavus (Cockerell, 1907)
- Amauropilio lacoei (Petrunkevitch, 1922) (note, this was later miswritten "Amauropilio lawei" in Mello-Leitão, 1937).
