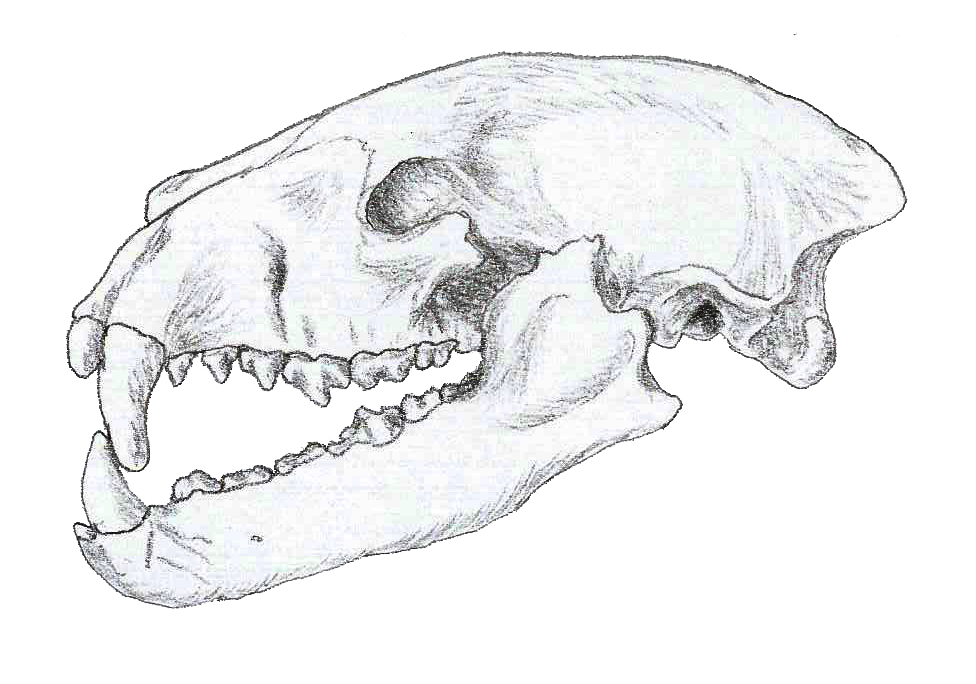
- Illustrated skull

Scientific classification
- Kingdom: Animalia
- Phylum: Chordata
- Class: Mammalia
- Order: Carnivora
- Family: †Amphicyonidae
- Genus: †Adilophontes; Hunt, 2002
- Species: †A. brachykolos

Binomial name
- †Adilophontes brachykolos Hunt, 2002

= Adilophontes =

Adilophontes Temporal range: Early Miocene (latest Arikareean)

Extinct genus of carnivores

Adilophontes is an extinct genus of amphicyonid ("bear-dog") from the early Miocene of Wyoming. It is known from a single species, Adilophontes brachykolos, which is only found in the upper Harrison Formation of the Arikaree Group. This area is dated to the latest Arikareean, about 19 million years ago. Adilophontes roughly translates to "fearless slayer", and brachykolos means "short-legged".

Adilophontes is a medium-large amphicyonid, with the largest skull about 30 cm (12 in) long. Its body mass is estimated at around 125 kg (276 lb). The skull is deep but very narrow, and the limb bones are notably short (hence the species name). Adilophontes is classified in the subfamily Daphoeninae, and like other daphoenines it has well-developed premolars and smaller molars.
