= Bathygenys =

Bathygenys Temporal range: 37–34 Ma (Chadronian, late Eocene)

Scientific classification
- Kingdom: Animalia
- Phylum: Chordata
- Class: Mammalia
- Order: Artiodactyla
- Family: †Merycoidodontidae
- Genus: †Bathygenys; Douglass, 1901

Type species
- †Bathygenys alpha

Species
- B. alpha Douglass, 1901; B. hedlundae Schultz & Falkenbach, 1968; B. reevesi Wilson, 1971

Synonyms
- Genus synonymy: Megabathygenys Schultz & Falkenbach, 1968; Parabathygenys Schultz & Falkenbach, 1968; Species synonymy: M. goorisi Schultz & Falkenbach, 1968; P. paralpha Schultz & Falkenbach, 1968

Extinct genus of mammals

Bathygenys is an extinct genus of oreodont within the family Merycoidodontidae and subfamily Oreonetinae, endemic to western North America. It lived during the late Eocene (Chadronian NALMA).

Like other oreodonts, Bathygenys was a herbivore which probably had a heavily-built body, short tail, short feet, and four-toed hooves. It was one of the earliest and smallest known oreodonts, with a relatively deep lower jaw and a small, rounded periotic bone. Bathygenys is used as the main mammalian index fossil of the Chadronian age.

== Species ==
=== B. alpha ===
The type species, B. alpha, was originally named based on lower jaw fragments from Pipestone Springs, a site in the Renova Formation of Montana dated to the middle Chadronian (about 35 Ma). The species was named by Carnegie Museum paleontologist Earl Douglass in 1901, who described these original fragments. William Diller Matthew (1903), from the American Museum of Natural History, also collected some skull material from the site, though the AMNH fossils have subsequently been lost.

More extensive fossils of B. alpha are known from the White River Formation of Wyoming, particularly the Flagstaff Rim and Ledge Creek areas of Natrona County and the Yoder local fauna of Goshen County. "Megabathygenys goorisi" from Ledge Creek is probably a junior synonym of B. alpha.

Bathygenys fossils have also been reported from the Calf Creek local fauna (Cypress Hills Formation) in Saskatchewan and the Kings Canyon site (White River Formation) in Colorado.

=== B. hedlundae ===
B. hedlundae is the smallest Bathygenys species, and is only found in middle Chadronian beds at Flagstaff Rim in Wyoming. Originally considered a subspecies of B. alpha, it can be distinguished by a deeper preorbital fossa. Parabathygenys paralpha is a junior synonym of this species.

=== B. reevesi ===
B. reevesi is the largest Bathygenys species, and the most abundant, with numerous fossils from the Little Egypt local fauna in the Chambers Tuff of Presidio County, Texas. This also makes it the oldest Bathygenys species, since the Little Egypt local fauna is earliest Chadronian in age (~37 Ma). Bathygenys fossils from other Chadronian local faunas in the area (Airstrip and Ash Springs in the Capote Mountain Tuff of Texas, Rancho Gaitan in Chihuahua) also appear to be B. reevesi.
