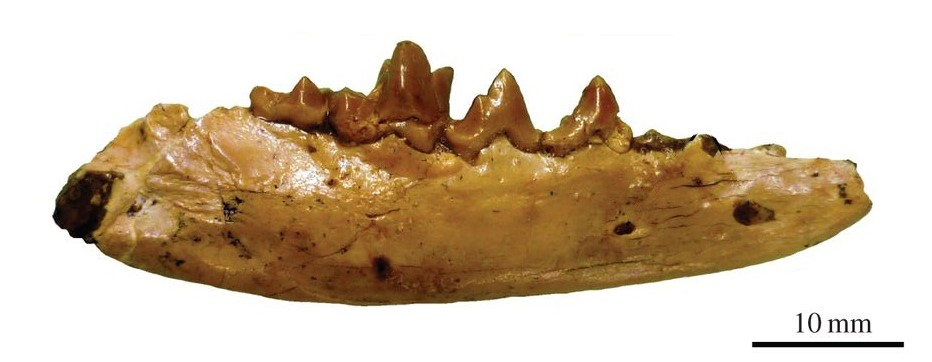
- Lower jaw

Scientific classification
- Kingdom: Animalia
- Phylum: Chordata
- Class: Mammalia
- Infraclass: Placentalia
- Order: Carnivora
- Family: †Amphicyonidae
- Genus: †Angelarctocyon; Tomiya & Tseng, 2016
- Species: †A. australis

Binomial name
- †Angelarctocyon australis (Gustafson, 1986)

= Angelarctocyon =

Angelarctocyon Temporal range: 39–33 Ma Middle Eocene to Early Oligocene

Extinct genus of carnivores

Angelarctocyon is an extinct genus of Amphicyonidae (bear dog), which belongs to the order Carnivora.

It was originally interpreted as a miacid and named Miacis australis; however, a 2016 study suggested it is an early amphicyonid. Analysis of skeletal morphology suggests it is most closely related to another taxon previously attributed to Miacidae, Gustafsonia (formerly Miacis cognitus), alongside the well known New World amphicyonid, Daphoenus.
