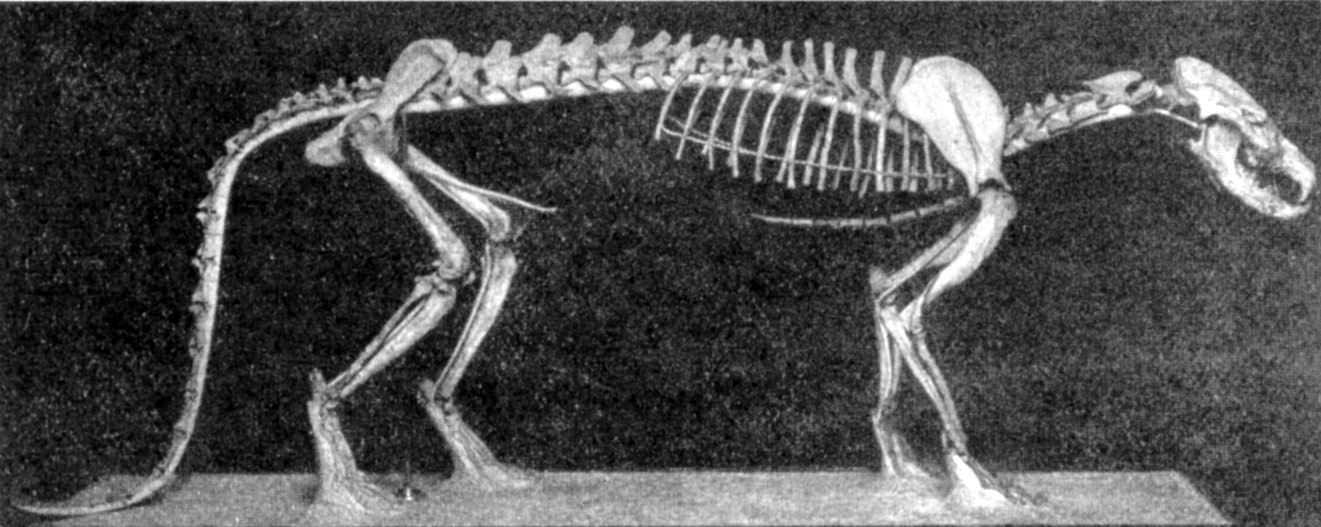
- Daphoenodon skeleton.

Scientific classification
- Kingdom: Animalia
- Phylum: Chordata
- Class: Mammalia
- Order: Carnivora
- Family: †Amphicyonidae
- Subfamily: †Daphoeninae; Leidy, 1853

Type species
- †Daphoenus vetus

Genera
- Adilophontes; Brachyrhynchocyon; Daphoenictis; Daphoenodon; Daphoenus; Paradaphoenus

= Daphoeninae =

Daphoeninae Temporal range: 42–15.97 Ma Middle Eocene-Middle Miocene

Extinct subfamily of carnivores

The Daphoeninae are an extinct subfamily of dog-like, terrestrial carnivores, which belonged to the family Amphicyonidae of the suborder Caniformia. The group inhabited North America from the Middle Eocene subepoch to the Middle Miocene subepoch 42—15.97 million years ago (Mya), existing for about 26.03 million years.

== Fossil distribution ==
Daphoenus fossils found in late Oligocene rocks in the Great Plains are dated about 28 million years old. Daphoenus survived to 27 Mya in the Pacific Northwest in the John Day beds of Oregon. Other sites include: Alachua County, Florida (Whitneyan) estimated at 31.1—24.3 Ma., Tecuya Canyon, California (Arikareean age) 30.8—20.6 Ma., Haystack Member Formation, Wheeler County, Oregon (Hemingfordian) 20.6—16.3 Mya, Lac Pelletier, Alberta, Canada (Duchesnean) around 42 Mya.
