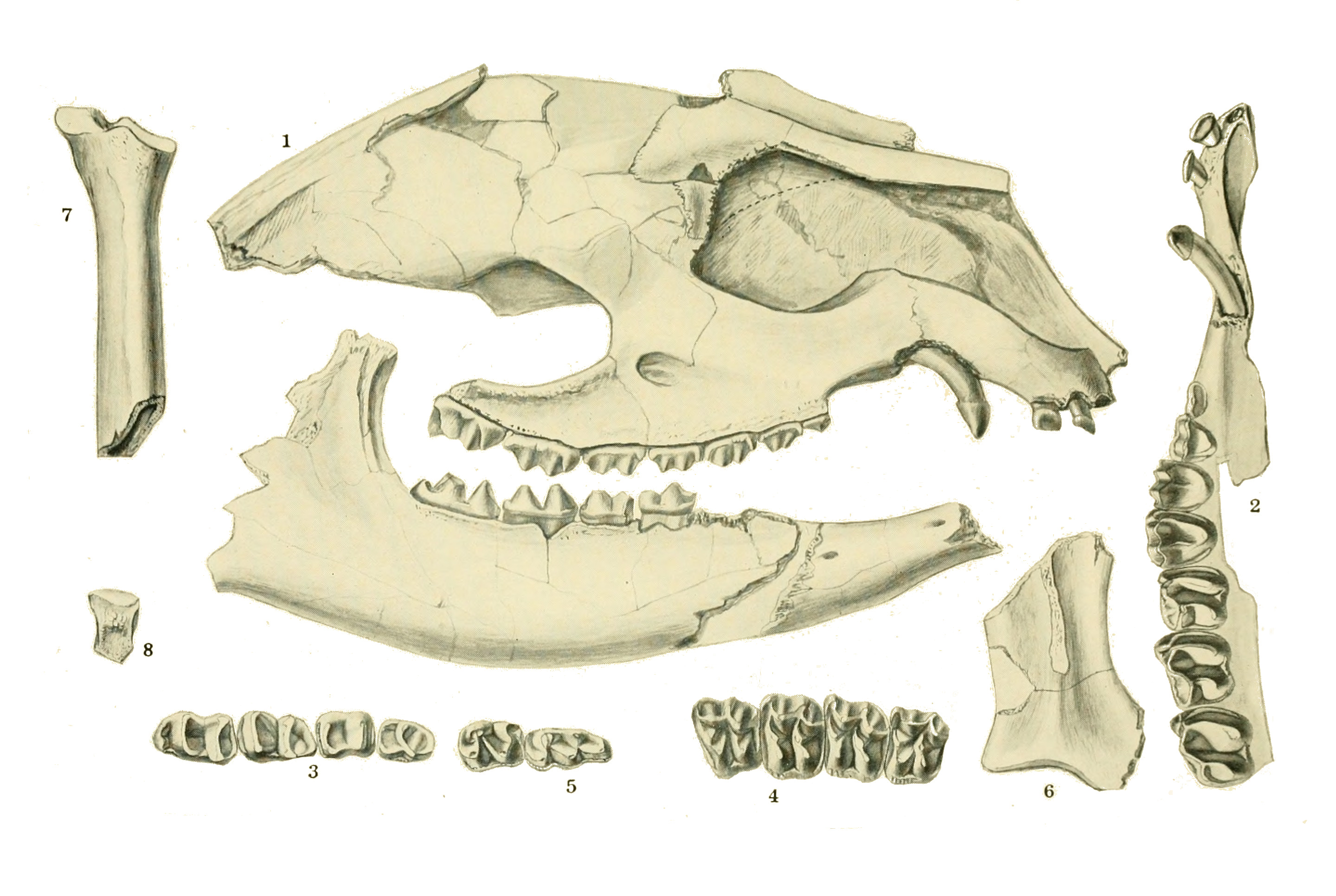
- Illustration of Helaletes nanus skull and teeth (1-3) and Epihippus gracilis teeth and bone fragments (4-8)

Scientific classification
- Kingdom: Animalia
- Phylum: Chordata
- Class: Mammalia
- Order: Perissodactyla
- Family: Equidae
- Genus: †Epihippus; Marsh, 1877

Synonyms
- Duchesnehippus

= Epihippus =

Epihippus Temporal range: 46.2–38.0 Ma Early Uintan to Duchesnean

Extinct genus of horse

Epihippus is an extinct genus of the modern horse family Equidae that lived in the Eocene, from 46 to 38 million years ago.

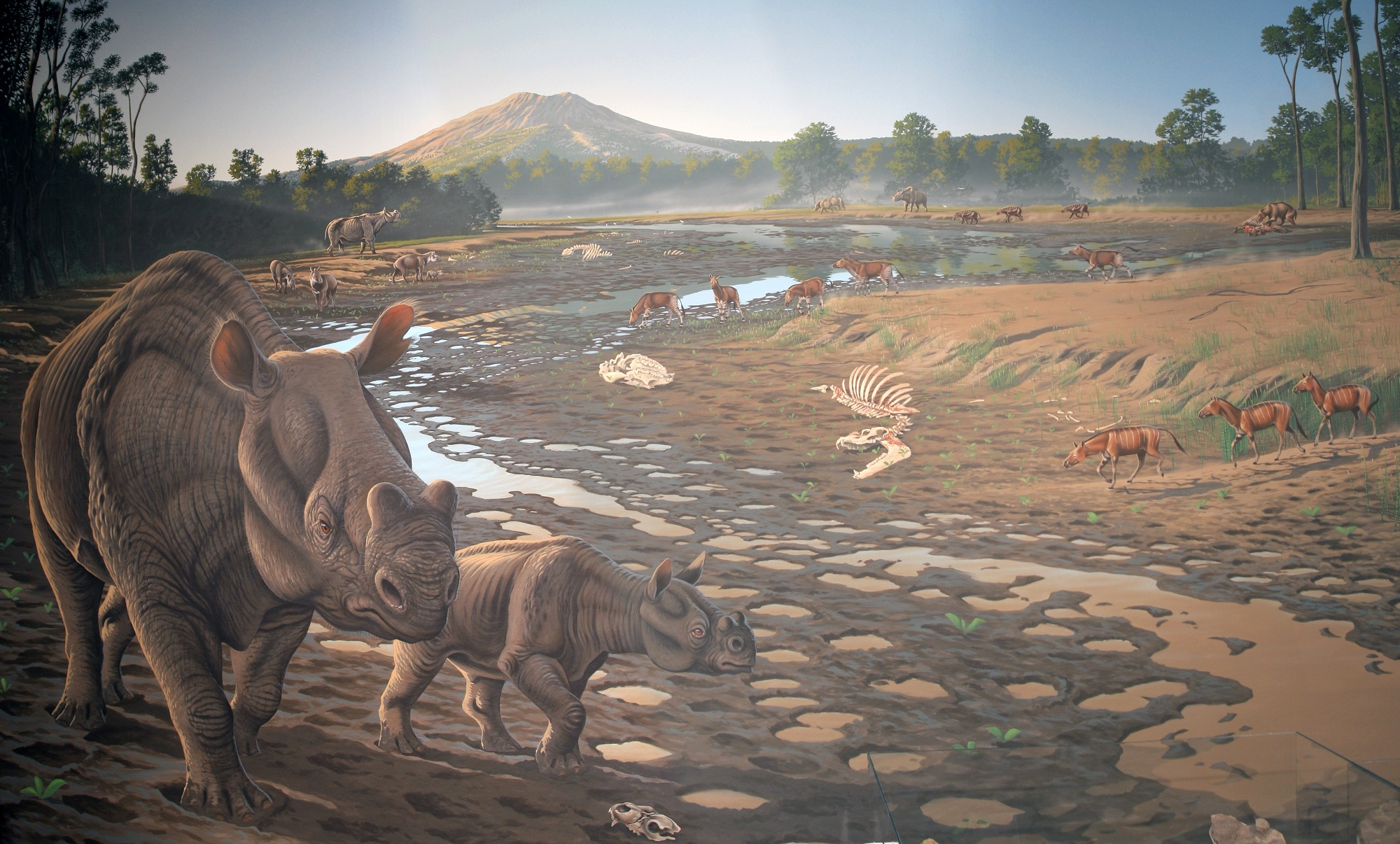
Restoration of Epihippus (middle) and other animals of the Hancock Mammal Quarry

Epihippus is believed to have evolved from Orohippus, which continued the evolutionary trend of increasingly efficient grinding teeth. It had five grinding, low-crowned cheek teeth with well-formed crests. A late and partially recognized species of Epihippus, sometimes called Duchesnehippus intermedius, had teeth similar to Oligocene equids, although slightly less developed. The genus fed mostly on insects, berries and plant material.

== Species ==
There are three species:

- Epihippus gracilis
- Epihippus intermedius (Used to be classified in the Epihippus Genus, now classified elsewhere)
- Epihippus uintensis
