= Endocast =

Internal cast of a hollow object

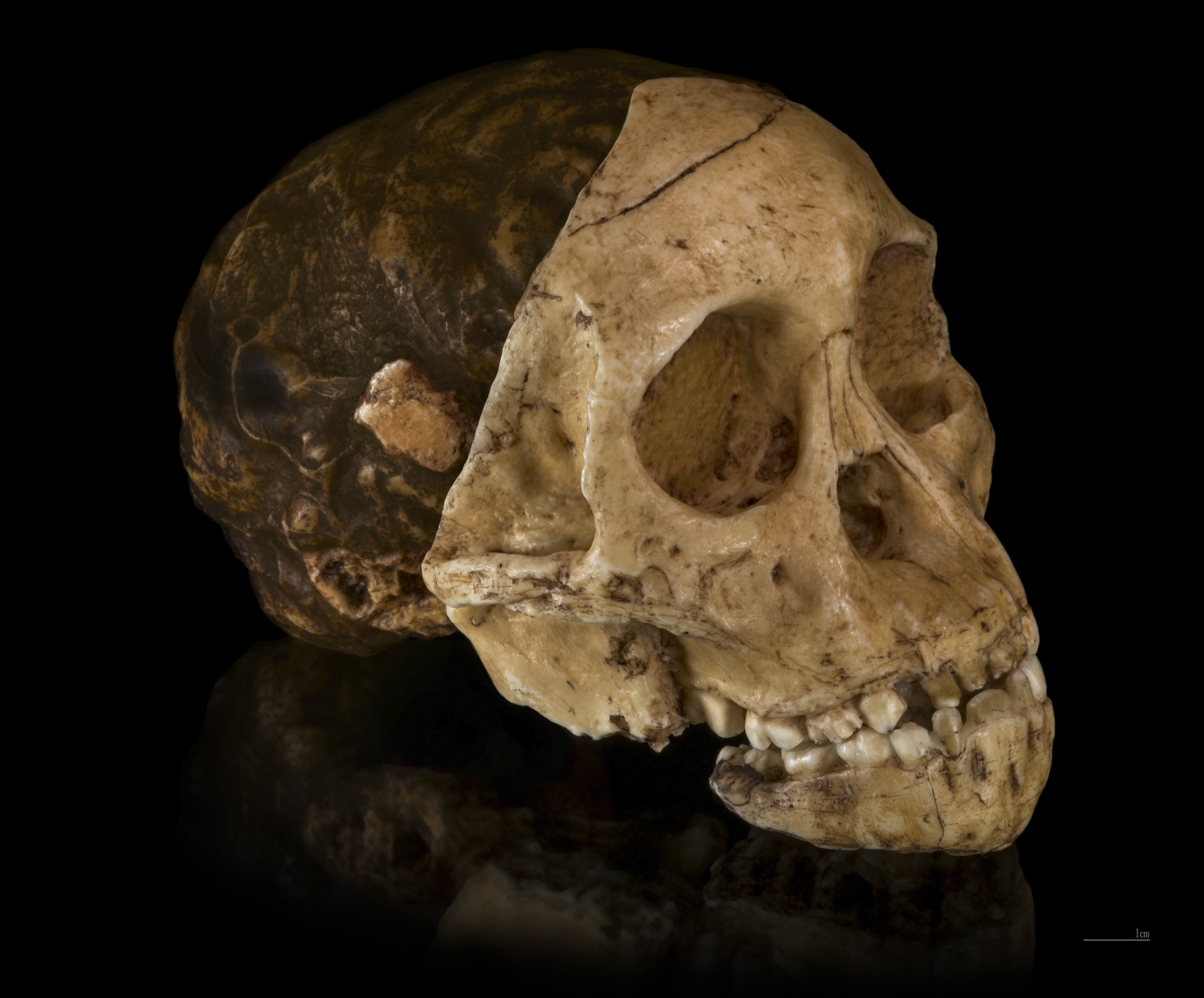
A natural endocast of the brain of the Taung Child, a young Australopithecus africanus, with the facial portion of the skull attached

An endocast is the internal cast of a hollow object, often referring to the cranial vault in the study of brain development in humans and other organisms. Endocasts can be artificially made for examining the properties of a hollow, inaccessible space, or they may occur naturally through fossilization.

== Cranial endocasts ==
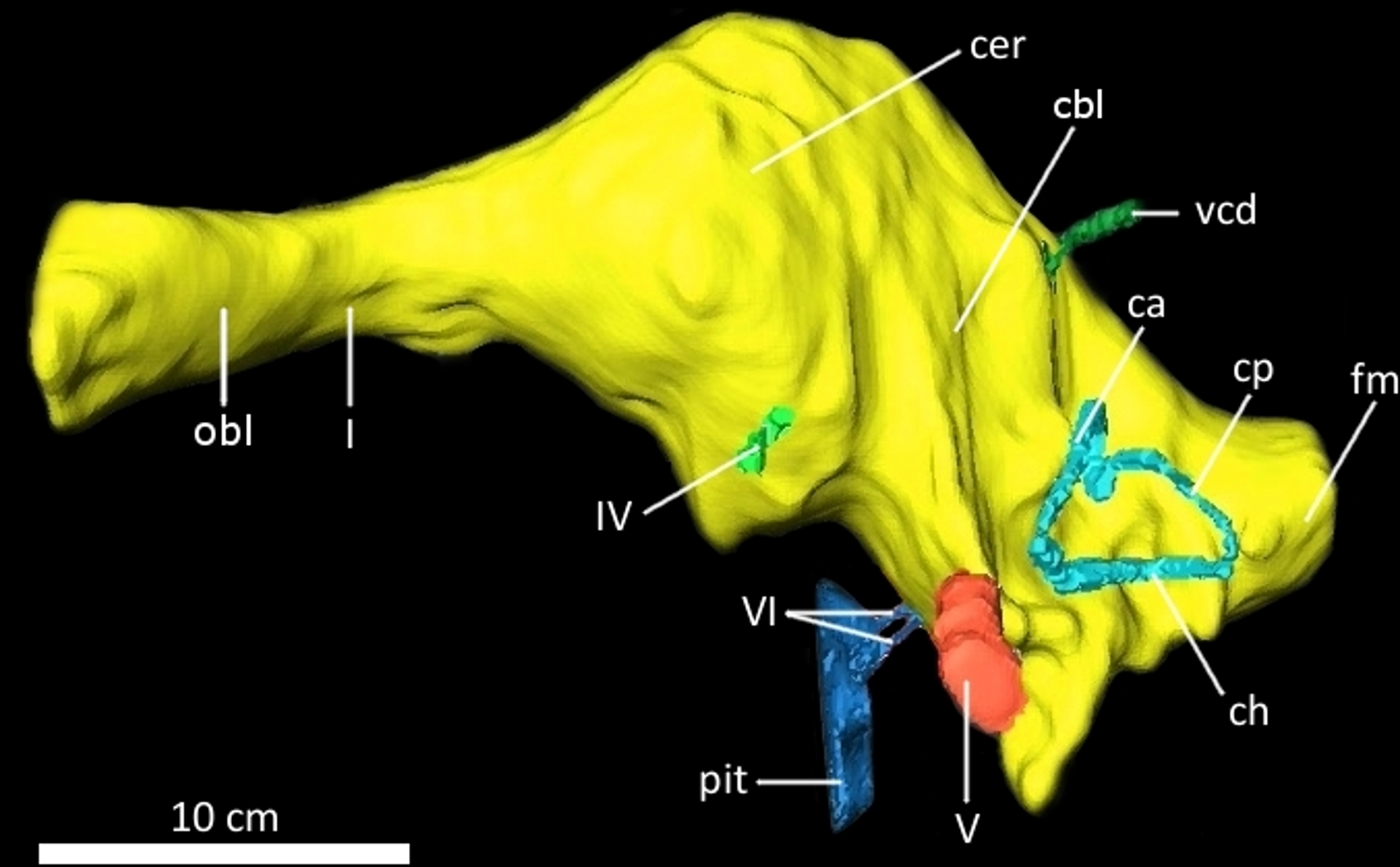
Digital cranial endocast of Acrocanthosaurus, an early Cretaceous theropod

=== Artificial casts ===
Endocasts of the inside of the neurocranium (braincase) are often made in paleoanthropology to study brain structures and hemispheric specialization in extinct human ancestors. While an endocast can not directly reveal brain structure, it can allow scientists to gauge the size of areas of the brain situated close to the surface, notably Wernicke's and Broca's areas, responsible for interpreting and producing speech.

Traditionally, the casting material is some form of rubber or rubber-like material. The openings to the brain cavity, except for the foramen magnum, are closed, and the liquid rubber is slushed around in the empty cranial vault and then left to set. The resulting hollow sphere can then be drained of air like a balloon and pulled out through the foramen magnum. Rubber endocasts like these were the standard practice until the end of the 20th century and are still used in some fields. However, scientists are increasingly utilizing computerized tomography scanning technology to create digital endocasts in order to avoid risking damage to valuable specimens.

=== Natural endocasts ===
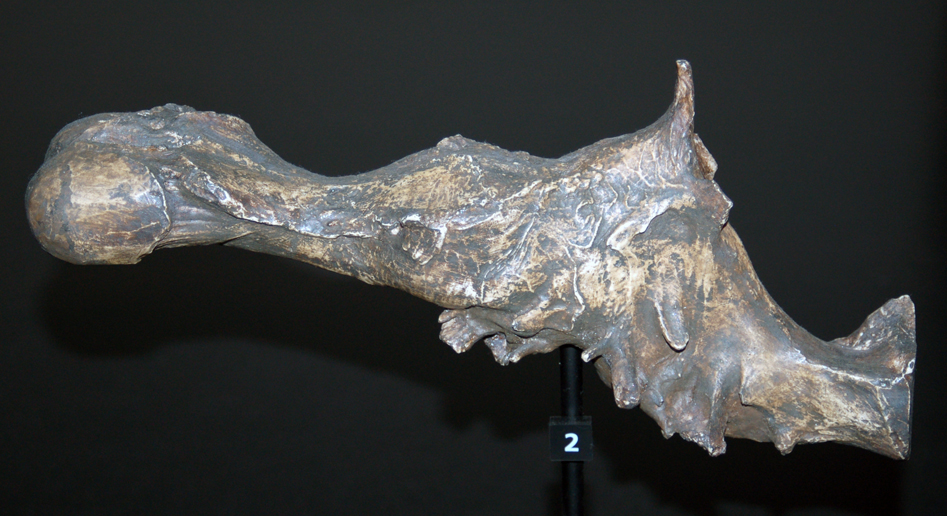
Natural (fossil) endocast of a Tyrannosaurus cranial vault, showing extensive olfactory bulb (left)

Natural cranial endocasts are also known. The famous Taung Child, the first Australopithecus found, consists of a natural endocast connected to the facial portion of the skull. It was the shape of the brain that allowed Raymond Dart to conclude that the fossil was that of a human relative rather than an extinct ape.

Mammal endocasts are particularly useful, as they resemble the fresh brain with the dura mater in place. Such "fossil brains" are known from several hundred different mammal species. More than a hundred natural casts of the cranial vault of Bathygenys (a small oreodont) alone are known, some having identifiable features down to the major gyri. Several hundred casts of various dinosaurs are known, among them a Tyrannosaurus brain vault, showing the animal had limited intelligence and a well-developed sense of smell. The oldest known natural cranial endocast is a fossil fish brain from a Holocephalan, some 300 million years old.

== Endocasts of other hollows ==
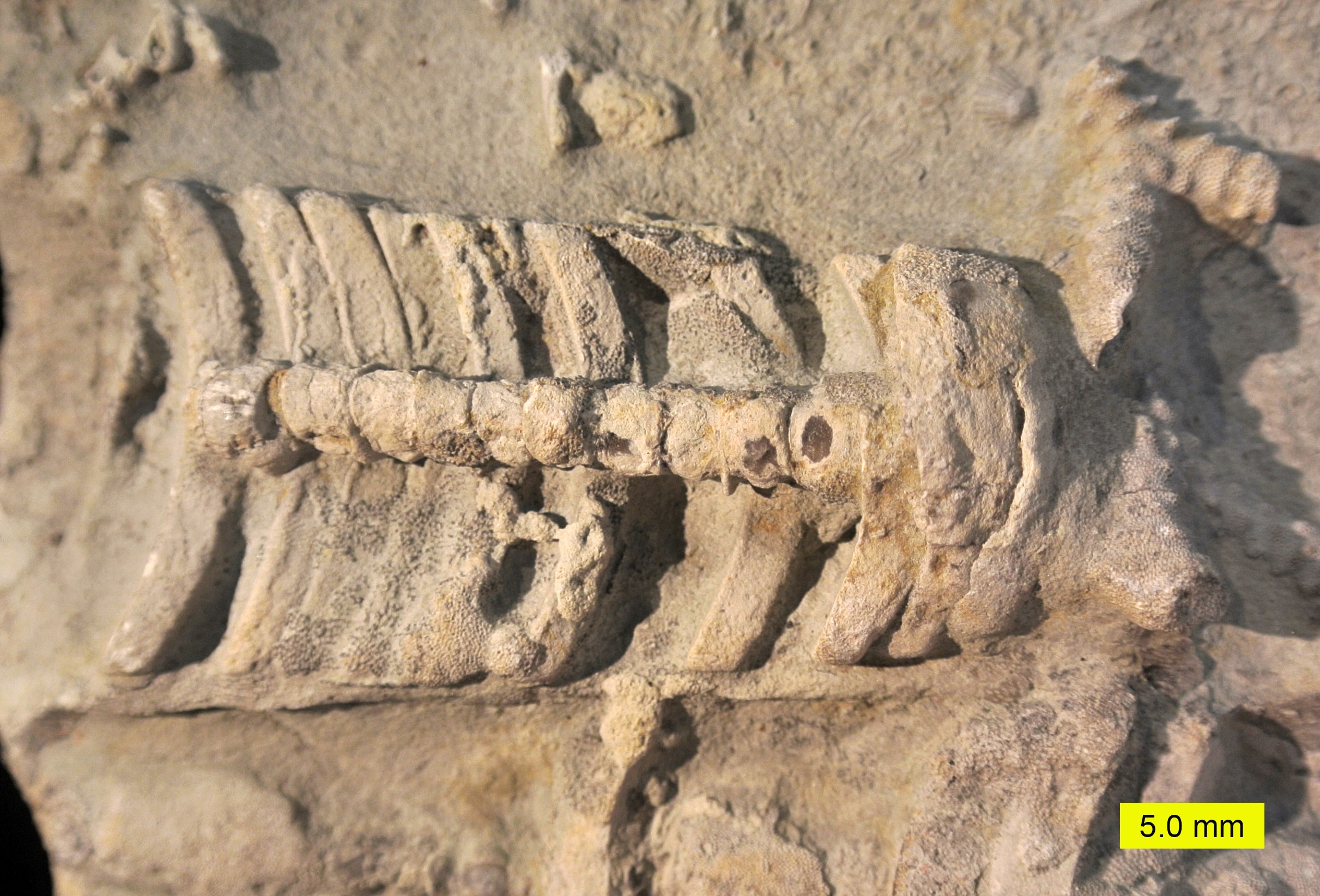
Endocast of the shell of an Ordovician straight-shelled cephalopod, showing the internal shell structure

Endocast fossils from animals with shells that easily disintegrate or dissolve can often be encountered free from their mold fossil, like the aragonite shells of certain molluscs and the tests of sea urchins. A frequently occurring form is the internal mold of brachiopods and bivalves. In the quite symmetrical genus brachiopod Pentamerus, the endocast resembles a vulva, giving these fossils the name Schamstein or Mutterstein ("shame stone" or "mother stone") in German, while some bivalve endocasts are traditionally known as heart-of-stone or bull hearts in Britain. The "Venus of Svinesund", an early Mesolithic Venus figurine from Norway, is a re-worked Ordovician bivalve endocast. Endocasts are also known to develop from snail shells and sea urchins, and even from the stomach hollow of jellyfish, a group that rarely leaves fossil traces.

Artificial endocasts are sometimes made from blood vessels for medical or anatomical reasons. The blood vessel of an organ (e.g. brain or liver) is injected with a resin. When it is set, the organ itself is dissolved, leaving a three-dimensional image of the blood supply to the organ.
