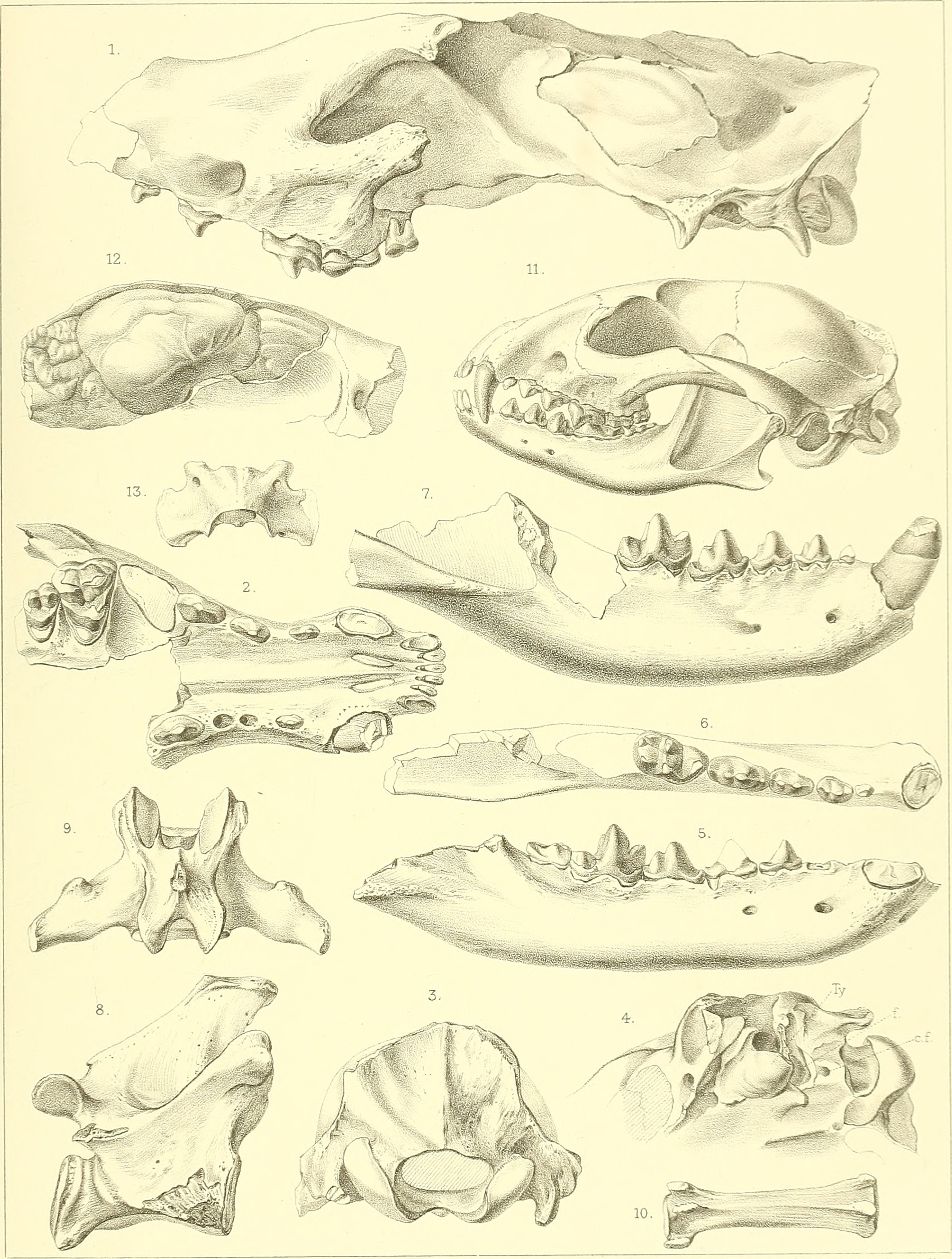
- Illustrated jaw fossils of Brachyrhynchocyon dodgei (6-7) and other amphicyonids

Scientific classification
- Kingdom: Animalia
- Phylum: Chordata
- Class: Mammalia
- Infraclass: Placentalia
- Order: Carnivora
- Family: †Amphicyonidae
- Subfamily: †Daphoeninae
- Genus: †Brachyrhynchocyon; Scott & Jepsen, 1936

Species
- †B. dodgei Scott 1898; †B. intermedius; †B. montanus

Synonyms
- Daphoenocyon dodgei; Daphoenus dodgei; Daphoenus felinus; Brachicyon; Daphoenocyon

= Brachyrhynchocyon =

Brachyrhynchocyon Temporal range: 33.9–33.3 Ma Late Eocene-Early Oligocene

Extinct genus of carnivores

Brachyrhynchocyon is an extinct genus of terrestrial carnivore, which belonged to the family Amphicyonidae ("bear dogs") of the suborder Caniformia.

Many coprolites of B. dodgei are known from the Chadronian-aged site of Pipestone Springs Main Pocket in the Renova Formation.
