= Paradaphoenus =

Paradaphoenus Temporal range: 33.3–15.97 Ma Early Oligocene-Middle Miocene

Scientific classification
- Kingdom: Animalia
- Phylum: Chordata
- Class: Mammalia
- Order: Carnivora
- Family: †Amphicyonidae
- Genus: †Paradaphoenus; Wortman, Matthew (1899)

Species
- P. cuspigerus; P. minimus; P. tooheyi

Extinct genus of carnivores

Paradaphoenus is a physically small amphicyonid that inhabited North America from the Early Oligocene to the Middle Miocene, 33.3—15.97 Ma, existing for approximately 17 million years. Fossils have been found at Haystack, Oregon, Banner County, Nebraska, Dawes County, Nebraska, and Sheep Mtn, South Dakota.
