= Cypress Hills Formation =

Geologic formation in Canada

- Stratigraphic range: Middle Eocene to early Miocene
- Type: Geological formation
- Underlies: current erosional surface
- Overlies: Ravenscrag Formation
- Thickness: up to 80 metres (260 ft)

Lithology
- Primary: Gravel, sand
- Other: Conglomerate, sandstone, marl

Location
- Coordinates: 49.594°N 108.796°W
- Region: Alberta; Saskatchewan
- Country: Canada

Type section
- Named for: Cypress Hills
- Named by: M.Y. Williams and W.S. Dyer, 1930

The Cypress Hills Formation is a stratigraphic unit of middle Eocene to early Miocene age in the Western Canada Sedimentary Basin. It is named for the Cypress Hills of southeastern Alberta and southwestern Saskatchewan and was first described from outcrops on the slopes of the Cypress Hills in 1930. It is known for preserving a wealth of vertebrate fossils.

== Lithology ==
The Cypress Hills Formation is composed primarily of gravel and sand, some of which has been cemented to conglomerate and sandstone. There is also some minor marlstone. The majority of the pebbles, cobbles and boulders are well-rounded and consist of quartzite and chert. There are minor pebbles and cobbles of porphyritic rocks and argillite. Sedimentary structures include cross-bedding and imbricate cobbles and boulders. The sediments are generally coarser-grained in the western areas.

== Environment of deposition ==
The gravels and sands of the Cypress Hills Formation were derived primarily from the Rocky Mountains of northwestern Montana and southernmost Alberta and British Columbia when those areas were uplifted during the Laramide Orogeny. The resulting sediments were deposited across southeastern Alberta and southwestern Saskatchewan by northeast-flowing braided rivers. Additional material came from the Sweetgrass Hills, Bearpaw Mountains and Highwood Mountains in northern Montana when they were uplifted due to igneous intrusive activity.

== Paleontology ==
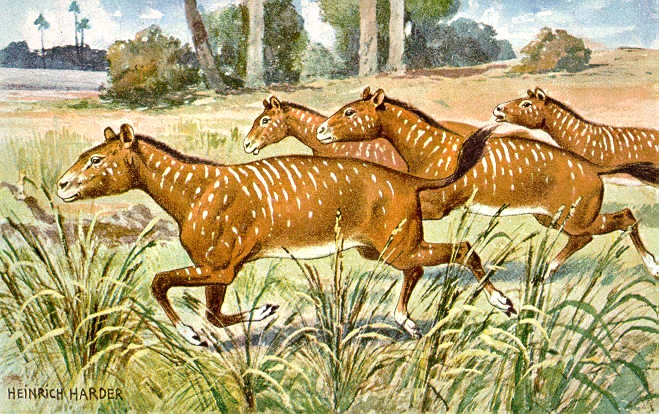
A reconstruction of Mesohippus. Bones of this extinct horse have been found in the Cypress Hills Formation.

Vertebrate fossils have been recovered from the Cypress Hills Formation since 1883, producing a wealth of material for study. The largest bones and teeth come from brontotheres; some of the skulls are almost four feet (1.2 m) long. There are also bones of entelodonts (the so-called "giant pigs" or "hell pigs"), hornless members of the rhinoceros family, small camels, antelopes, oreodonts, anthracotheres, and several genera of horses including Mesohippus, Parahippus, and Hypohippus. Carnivores include small canids, medium sized sabre-toothed cats, and the bear-like Hemipsalodon. Small mammals, represented primarily by teeth and jaw fragments, include rabbits and many kinds of rodents, as well as proscalopid insectivores. Reptiles and amphibians include crocodilians, turtles, boid snakes, burrowing toads, and spadefoot toads. There are also bones of freshwater fish such as catfish and bowfins.

== Climate ==
The climate during the time of deposition was semi-arid with seasonal rainfall, as indicated by the vertebrate fossils, as well as by the sedimentology and palynology. The browsing and grazing animals are characteristic of woodland savannas, dry savannas, and grassland plains. The remains of freshwater fish, reptiles, and amphibians attest to the presence of rivers and streams. The marlstones were probably deposited in shallow temporary lakes, mudflats, and debris flows.

== Age ==
The age of the Cypress Hills Formation has been determined primarily by biostratigraphy. Its vertebrate fossils indicate North American Land Mammal Ages of Uintan (middle Eocene) to Hemingfordian (early Miocene).

== Thickness and distribution ==
The Cypress Hills Formation is present primarily on the Cypress Hills and Swift Current plateaus in southeastern Alberta and southwestern Saskatchewan. It is exposed on the present day erosional surface, or covered by glacial drift and loess that were deposited during and after the Wisconsin glaciation. It reaches a maximum thickness of 80 metres (260 ft) and is typically about 40 metres (130 ft) thick. It rests unconformably on the Ravenscrag Formation.

== See also ==
- Missouri Coteau
