= Duchesnean =

North American faunal stage

The Duchesnean North American Stage is a North American Land Mammal Age (NALMA), covering an age of around 41.4 to 37.0 million years ago. It corresponds to part of the Eocene epoch (specifically the Bartonian stage of the Middle Eocene and the earliest Priabonian or Late Eocene). The Duchesnean is preceded by the Uintan and followed by the Chadronian NALMA.

Mammals which first appear in North America near the base of the Duchesnean include Hyaenodon (a large hyaenodont), Duchesneodus (a large brontothere), Duchesnehippus intermedius (an early horse), Amynodontopsis (an amynodont rhino), and Eotylopus (an oromerycid, an early relative of camels). Duchesneodus and Amynodontopsis seem to persist from the later part of the Uintan, so they are not surefire taxa for defining the Duchesnean. Though there are major differences between early and late Duchesnean mammal faunas, the Duchesnean as a whole lacks formal subdivisions.

The Middle Eocene Climatic Optimum (MECO) occurred early in the Duchesnean, followed by a resumed cooling trend. This climate instability began to break up rainforests in some regions, such as California, where shrubbier plants became more dominant. North American primate diversity declined as their habitats became more open and seasonal, though predatory mammals diversified. Hyaenodontines (large predators) and anthracotheriines (large herbivores related to hippos) immigrated into North America from Eurasia. Towards the end of the Duchesnean, mammal faunas are similar to the succeeding White River Fauna (Chadronian-Whitneyan). For example, merycoidodontids ("oreodonts", low-slung herbivores related to camels) begin to diversify around this time.

== Age ==
The oldest directly dated Duchesnean layer is the LaPoint ash in Utah, an ash bed which was dated to 39.74 ± 0.07 Ma in 1992. This age was later recalibrated to 40.26 ± 0.08 Ma in 2012, and the actual start of the Duchesnean would be slightly older. Based on magnetostratigraphy at early Duchesnean sites in the Sespe Formation of California, the Uintan-Duchesnean boundary may be within chron C19n (about 41.4 Ma). In the Chambers Tuff of Texas, bracketing ash beds and magnetostratigraphy correlate the Duchesnean-Chadronian boundary to between 38-37 Ma, within chron C17n.

== Formations ==
The Duchesnean is named after the Duchesne River Formation in the Uinta Basin of Utah. The Duchesne River Formation's LaPoint Member is considered the type locality for the Duchesnean. Geological formations preserving Duchesnean fossils include:

- California:
  - Upper Pomerado Conglomerate
  - Santiago Formation (Member C, "Bone Sands")
  - Sespe Formation (Pearson Ranch local fauna, Simi Valley Landfill local fauna)
  - Sweetwater Formation (Bonita local fauna)
- Montana:
  - Climbing Arrow Formation (= Climbing Arrow Member of the Renova Formation, Shoddy Springs local fauna)
  - Black Butte Low site?
  - Rapamys site?
  - Teepee Mountain site?
- New Mexico:
  - Baca Formation
  - Cub Mountain Formation?
  - Upper Galisteo Formation (Tonque local fauna)
- Oregon:
  - Clarno Formation (Hancock Quarry?)
- Saskatchewan:
  - Cypress Hills Formation (Lac Pelletier local fauna)
- South Dakota:
  - Slim Buttes Formation (Antelope Creek local fauna)
- Texas:
  - Chambers Tuff (Porvenir local fauna)
  - Colmena Tuff (upper Candelaria local fauna?)
  - Devil's Graveyard Formation (Skyline Channels local fauna, Cotter Channels local fauna)
- Utah:
  - Brian Head Formation (Turtle Basin local fauna)
  - Duchesne River Formation ("Halfway" fauna, Dry Gulch Creek Member, LaPoint Member)
- Wyoming:
  - Wagon Bed Formation (upper Hendry Ranch Member)
