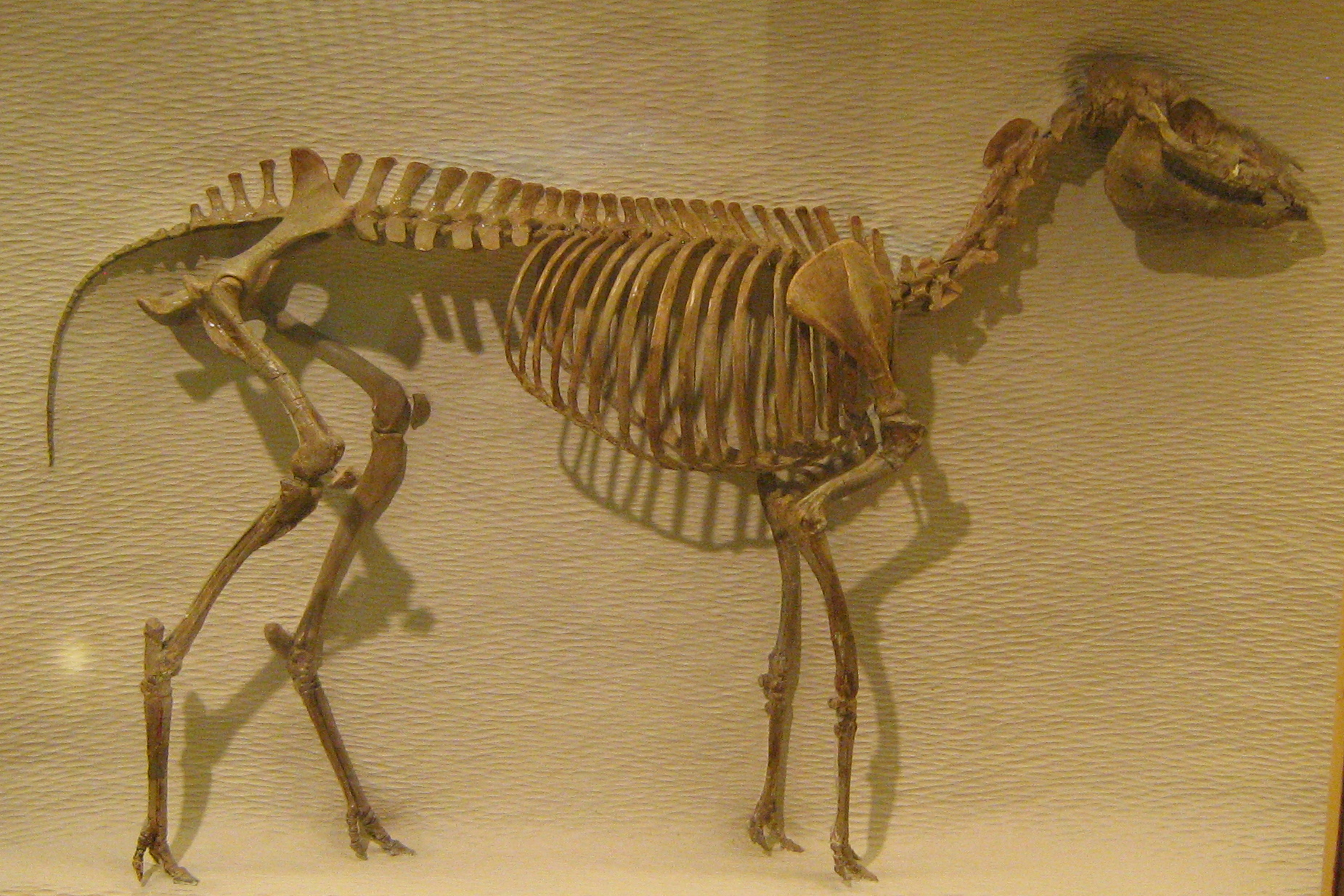
- Mesohippus barbouri skeleton at the Harvard Museum of Natural History

Scientific classification
- Kingdom: Animalia
- Phylum: Chordata
- Class: Mammalia
- Order: Perissodactyla
- Family: Equidae
- Subfamily: †Anchitheriinae
- Genus: †Mesohippus; Marsh, 1875

Species
- See text

= Mesohippus =

Mesohippus Temporal range: Late Eocene – Early Oligocene, 37–32 Ma

Extinct genus of mammals

Mesohippus (Greek: μεσο/meso meaning "middle" and ιππος/hippos meaning "horse") is an extinct genus of early horse. It lived 37 to 32 million years ago in the Early Oligocene. Like many fossil horses, Mesohippus was common in North America. Its shoulder height is estimated at 60 cm.

== Description ==
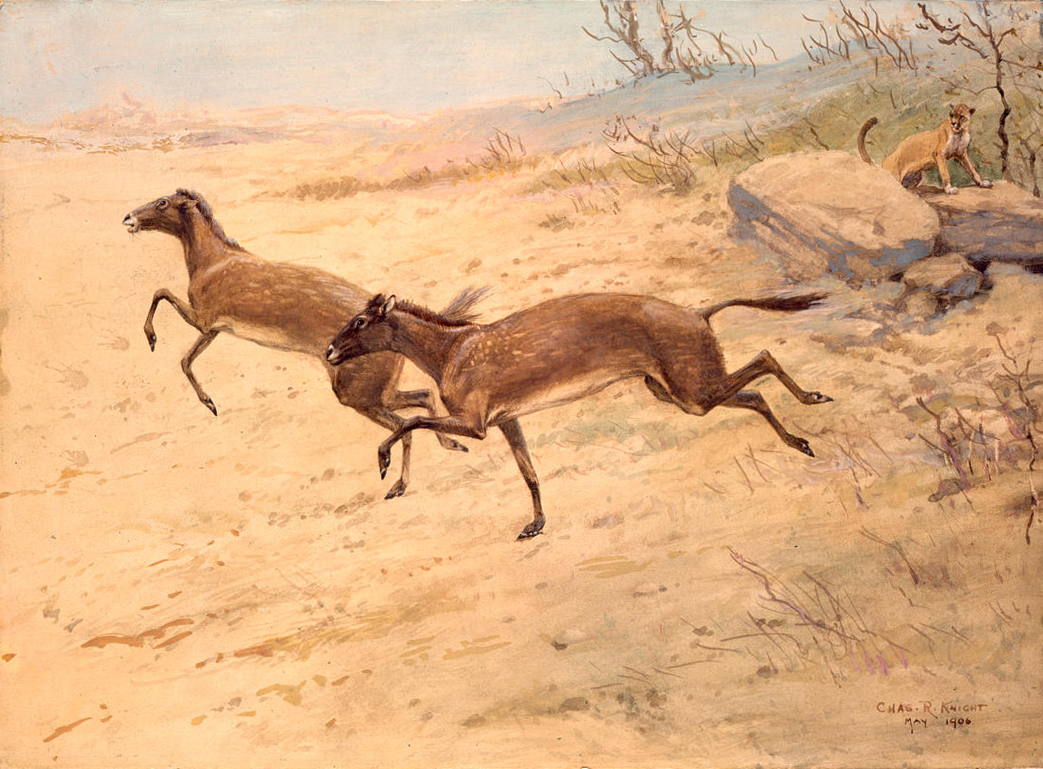
Restoration by Charles R. Knight

Mesohippus had longer legs than its predecessor Eohippus and stood about 60 cm (6 hands) tall. This equid is the first fully tridactyl horse in the evolutionary record, with the third digit being longer and larger than its first and second digits; Mesohippus had not developed a hoof at this point, rather it still had pads as seen in Hyracotherium and Orohippus. The face of Mesohippus was longer and larger than earlier equids. It had a slight facial fossa, or depression, in the skull. The eyes were rounder, and were set wider apart and further back than in Hyracotherium.

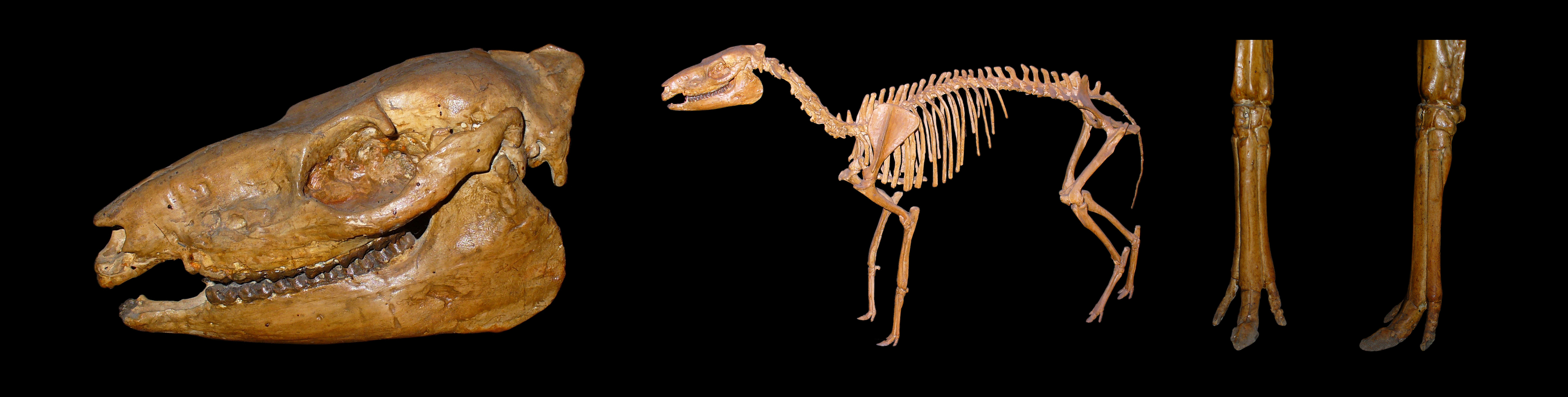
Skeleton

Unlike earlier horses, its teeth were low crowned and contained a single gap behind the front teeth, where the bit now rests in the modern horse. In addition, it had another grinding tooth, making a total of six. Mesohippus was a browser that fed on tender twigs and fruit. The cerebral hemisphere, or cranial cavity, was notably larger than that of its predecessors and its brain was similar to modern horses.

== Species ==
- M. bairdi
- M. barbouri
- M. braquistylus
- M. equiceps
- M. hypostylus
- M. intermedius
- M. latidens
- M. longiceps
- M. metulophus
- M. montanensis
- M. obliquidens
- M. proteulophus
- M. westoni

== See also ==
- Eohippus
- Protohippus
