= 2017 in paleomammalogy =

This paleomammalogy list records new fossil mammal taxa that were described during the year 2017, as well as notes other significant paleomammalogy discoveries and events which occurred during that year.

== Metatherians ==
=== Research ===
- A study on the morphology and phylogenetic relationships of Eobrasilia coutoi is published by Carneiro & Oliveira (2017).
- New information on the skull anatomy of Peratherium cuvieri is published by Selva & Ladevèze (2017).
- Zeusdelphys complicatus from the Eocene of Brazil is interpreted as a member of Hatcheriformes by Carneiro & Oliveira (2017).
- Description of the skull morphology of Epidolops ameghinoi and a study on the phylogenetic relationships of Polydolopimorphia is published by Beck (2017).
- A study on the causes of decline and extinction of sparassodonts is published by López-Aguirre et al. (2017).
- A study on the age of a specimen of Zygomaturus trilobus recovered from the Willandra Lakes locality (Australia), indicating that this species persisted for a considerable time after the first arrival of Indigenous Australians, is published by Westaway, Olley & Grün (2017).
- A study evaluating whether the decline of Australian megafaunal population in the Pleistocene, leading to megafaunal extinction in Australia, was caused by the climate changes is published by van der Kaars et al. (2017).
- A study on the environmental setting and diet of marsupials from two concentrated, fossil bone horizons at Cuddie Springs (Australia: one from the middle Pleistocene, and the second from the late Pleistocene, based on isotopic data and teeth microwear, is published by DeSantis et al. (2017).
- A study on the Pleistocene marsupial Diprotodon optatum, indicating it undertook seasonal, two-way migration in eastern Sahul, is published by Price et al. (2017).
- A study on the species richness and relative abundance of macropodiform marsupials from Riversleigh is published by Butler et al. (2017).
- A study exploring the potential of the collagen fingerprinting method also known as Zooarchaeology by Mass Spectrometry in studying Australian vertebrate palaeobiodiversity, using it to identify Late Pleistocene kangaroo fossils from two caves in Tasmania, is published by Buckley et al. (2017).
- A study on the Oligo-Miocene local faunas from the Riversleigh World Heritage Area (Australia), aiming to identify potential mammalian palaeocommunities and palaeocommunity types, is published by Myers et al. (2017).

=== New taxa ===
Name	Novelty	Status	Authors	Age	Unit	Location	Notes	Images
Anatoliadelphys	Gen. et sp. nov	Valid	Maga & Beck	Eocene (Lutetian)	Uzunçarşıdere Formation	Turkey	A probable non-marsupial member of Marsupialiformes. The type species is A. maasae.	
Barinya kutjamarpensis	Sp. nov	Valid	Binfield et al.	Miocene	Wipajiri Formation	Australia		
Perameles wilkinsonorum	Sp. nov	Valid	Travouillon et al.	Pliocene		Australia	A bandicoot, a species of Perameles.	
Silvicultor	Gen. et comb. et 2 sp. nov	Valid	Travouillon et al.	Pliocene		Australia	A bandicoot. The type species is "Peroryctes" tedfordi Turnbull, Ludelius & Archer (2003); genus also includes new species S. karae and S. hamiltonensis.	
Wakaleo schouteni	Sp. nov	Valid	Gillespie, Archer & Hand	Late Oligocene and early Miocene	Riversleigh World Heritage Area	Australia	A member of the family Thylacoleonidae.	

== Eutherians ==
=== Research ===
- A study on the timing of the diversification of placental mammals based on genomic data, indicating that the placentals underwent a continuous radiation across the Cretaceous–Paleogene boundary without apparent interruption by the Cretaceous–Paleogene extinction event, is published by Liu et al. (2017).
- A study on the completeness of the eutherian fossil record, intending to establish whether the lack of placental mammal fossils in the Cretaceous is more likely to be caused by poor fossil record or by genuine absence of placental mammals in the Cretaceous, is published by Davies et al. (2017).
- Revision of the fossil material of the species assigned to the basal eutherian genus Prokennalestes and a study on their morphological and size variability is published by Lopatin & Averianov (2017).
- A study on the impact of biotic (competition pressure) and abiotic factors (environmental change) on the evolutionary success, decline and extinction of large fossil herbivorous mammals from North America, Europe and Turkana Basin in Africa is published by Žliobaitė, Fortelius & Stenseth (2017).
- A study on the impacts of temperature and human activities in causing extirpations on local and regional scales, as well as on the causes of the extinction or major extirpations of four megafauna mammalian groups (i.e. mammoth, rhinoceros, horse and deer) in the Late Pleistocene and Holocene, is published by Wang & Zhang (2017).
- A study of the phylogenetic relationships of the Paleocene placental mammals is published by Halliday, Upchurch and Goswami (2017).
- A study on the impact of the Eocene Thermal Maximum 2 on the evolution of the body size in four placental lineages, especially in the early equid lineage Arenahippus pernix, is published by D'Ambrosia et al. (2017).
- A study evaluating whether the extinction of the Pleistocene megafauna of North America was caused by rapid overhunting after the appearance of humans by comparing the dates of the last appearances of megafauna and first appearances of humans across North America is published by Emery-Wetherell, McHorse & Davis (2017).
- Menéndez et al. (2017) infer the climatic variables for the middle Miocene of the Somosaguas vertebrate fossil site (Spain) on the basis of the body size structure of the mammal fauna known from the site, which is intimately related to climate and vegetation.
- Carnivore marks are identified on mammal bones from the Pleistocene of Argentina, including three ground sloth bones and one toxodontid bone, by Chichkoyan et al. (2017).
- Description of the osteology of the skull of the pampathere Holmesina floridanus based on the fossils from the Blancan of Florida is published by Gaudin & Lyon (2017).
- A study on the diet of Pleistocene glyptodonts and ground sloths from the Pleistocene of Argentina as indicated by δ13C values in bone collagen and carbonate is published by Bocherens et al. (2017).
- A study on the phylogenetic placement of members of the genus Thalassocnus within Megatheria is published by Amson, de Muizon & Gaudin (2017).
- Description of new mylodontine sloth remains from the late Pleistocene of Ecuador and Peru and a revision of the taxonomy of the genus Glossotherium is published by De Iuliis et al. (2017), who consider Glossotherium tropicorum to be a valid species.
- A study on a specimen of Stegomastodon platensis (or Notiomastodon platensis) recovered from Pleistocene fluvial sediments in the Santiago Basin (Chile), recovering life history information relating to the final four years of life and the season of death, is published by El Adli et al. (2017).
- An incomplete juvenile skull of Gomphotherium wimani from the Miocene Hujialiang Formation and cheek teeth of a member of the same species from the Miocene Dongxiang Formation (China) are described by Yang, Li & Wang (2017).
- A study on the dietary differences between members of the genera Sinomastodon, Stegodon and Elephas from the Pleistocene of South China is published by Zhang et al. (2017).
- Pleistocene proboscidean remains associated with human teeth are described from the Mawokou Cave (Guizhou, China) by Wang et al. (2017), who assign this fossil material to the species Stegodon orientalis and Elephas maximus.
- A study on the population dynamics of the mammoths and mastodons in the North American Midwest during the late Pleistocene and the possible causes of their regional extinction is published by Widga et al. (2017).
- A study on the regional variability of the diet of the American mastodon (Mammut americanum) is published by Green, DeSantis & Smith (2017).
- Meyer et al. (2017) report the recovery of full mitochondrial genomes from four and partial nuclear genomes from two fossils of the straight-tusked elephant (Palaeoloxodon antiquus), the analysis of which indicated that the straight-tusked elephant was a close relative of the African forest elephant.
- A study on the detrimental mutations in members of the relict, Holocene population of the woolly mammoth from the Wrangel Island prior to the extinction of the population is published by Rogers & Slatkin (2017).
- A study on the phylogenetic relationships of the late Pleistocene woolly mammoth populations based on the data set of 143 mammoth mitochondrial genomes is published by Chang et al. (2017).
- A study determining the sex of 98 woolly mammoth specimens collected at various locations throughout Siberia is published by Pečnerová et al. (2017), who report a significant skew toward males among the studied specimens and search for possible explanations of the observed skew in sex ratio.
- Fellows Yates et al. (2017) identify and generate twenty woolly mammoth mitochondrial genomes based on Late Pleistocene material from central Europe.
- A study on the habitat preferences of the desmostylians Desmostylus and Paleoparadoxia as indicated by their fossil occurrences is published by Matsui et al. (2017).
- A study on the humeral morphology of the desmostylians, intending to establish whether different desmostylian genera can be distinguished on the basis of their humeri, is published by Matsui (2017).
- Description of cranial and postcranial remains of Pyrotherium from the Oligocene locality of Quebrada Fiera (Mendoza Province, Argentina) is published by Cerdeño & Vera (2017).
- A study on the diversity of bats of Haiti through time based on fossil evidence is published by Soto-Centeno, Simmons & Steadman (2017).
- A study on the body size variation in Neogene odd-toed ungulates and even-toed ungulates from Europe and North America and on whether it is correlated with origination and/or extinction rates across clades and regions is published by Huang et al. (2017).
- A redescription of the skull anatomy of the holotype specimen of Eoastrapostylops riolorense, with an emphasis on the auditory region, is published by Kramarz, Bond & Rougier (2017), who interpret this species as a member of a basal meridiungulate lineage that diverged before the differentiation among astrapotheres, pyrotheres and notoungulates.
- A description of the microstructure of the tooth enamel of Carodnia vieirai is published by Bergqvist & von Koenigswald (2017).
- A fossil of the litoptern species Neolicaphrium recens is described from the Pleistocene deposits of the Río Dulce (Santiago del Estero Province, Argentina) by Gaudioso et al. (2017), representing the northernmost and westernmost record of the species.
- A nearly complete mitochondrial genome of the litoptern Macrauchenia patachonica is recovered by Westbury et al. (2017).
- A study on variation in teeth growth and eruption in notoungulates in the context of geological, climatic and environmental changes taking place in South America from the late Paleocene onwards is published by Gomes Rodrigues, Herrel & Billet (2017).
- A systematic revision of members of the family Archaeopithecidae from the Eocene of Patagonia (Argentina) is published by Vera (2017), who recognizes Archaeopithecus rogeri as the only valid species.
- A study on the phylogenetic relationships of hegetotheriid notoungulates, as well as their possible ancestral area and vicariance, dispersal and extinction events, is published by Seoane, Roig Juñent & Cerdeño (2017).
- Revision of the content of the hegetotheriid species Prohegetotherium sculptum based on a reexamination of the type specimens and a study on the phylogenetic relationships of hegetotheriids is published by Kramarz & Bond (2017).
- Description of a skeleton of Thomashuxleya externa with a well-preserved skull and jaws associated with postcrania, recovered from the Eocene of Cañadón Vaca (Argentina), and a study on the phylogenetic relationships of the species is published by Carrillo & Asher (2017).
- A study comparing tooth morphology and development in mesotheriid notoungulates and extant gundis is published by Gomes Rodrigues et al. (2017).
- A study on the diet of the three most abundant ungulates from the La Brea Tar Pits (Bison antiquus, Camelops hesternus and Equus occidentalis) is published by Jones & DeSantis (2017).
- Description of the morphology of the skeleton of Hyrachyus modestus is published by Bai et al. (2017).
- A description of new fossil material of the helaletid tapiroids Paracolodon fissus and Desmatotherium mongoliense from the Eocene Irdin Manha Formation (Inner Mongolia, China) and a study on the phylogenetic relationships of these species is published by Bai et al. (2017).
- A study on the phylogenetic relationships of the rhinoceros genus Stephanorhinus based on ancient protein sequences is published by Welker et al. (2017).
- Skull of Stephanorhinus kirchbergensis is described from the Chondon River valley (Arctic Yakutia, Russia) by Kirillova et al. (2017), representing the first find of a member of the genus Stephanorhinus above the Arctic Circle.
- A study on the incidence of developmental abnormalities in the neck vertebrae (the presence of cervical ribs) in the late Pleistocene population of the woolly rhinoceros (Coelodonta antiquitatis) is published by van der Geer & Galis (2017).
- Skeleton of a pregnant mare of Eurohippus messelensis with preserved soft tissues is described from the Eocene Messel pit (Germany) by Franzen & Habersetzer (2017).
- A study on the speciation rates and the evolution of body size and tooth morphology in Neogene and Quaternary radiation of horses is published by Cantalapiedra et al. (2017).
- A study on the fossil horse metapodials, testing how locomotor bone stresses changed with digit reduction and increasing body size across the horse lineage, is published by McHorse, Biewener & Pierce (2017).
- A study on the ontogenetic changes in the teeth of the late Miocene hipparionines based on fossils from Fugu (Shaanxi, China) is published by Li et al. (2017).
- A study on the diet and habitat of specimens of Dinohippus mexicanus and Neohipparion eurystyle known from the late Hemphillian localities in central Mexico as indicated by stable carbon and oxygen isotopes determined in molar enamel is published by Pérez-Crespo et al. (2017).
- A study on the number of species of horses that inhabited the Western Interior of North America prior to the end-Pleistocene extinction, based on cheek tooth morphology and ancient mtDNA, is published by Barrón-Ortiz et al. (2017).
- A study on the growth pattern of the first lower molar in extant and extinct species of Equus and its relationship with life history events is published by Nacarino-Meneses et al. (2017).
- A study on the morphology of the middle ear and bony labyrinth of the anoplotheriid even-toed ungulate Diplobune minor and their implications for the locomotion of members of this species is published by Orliac, Araújo & Lihoreau (2017).
- Fossils of a member of the camelid genus Hemiauchenia are described from the late Pliocene of Argentina by Gasparini et al. (2017), representing the oldest record of the tribe Lamini in South America reported so far.
- DNA sequence data is generated for samples of 12 flat-headed peccary specimens from the Sheriden Cave (Ohio, United States) by Perry et al. (2017).
- A study on the morphology of the bony labyrinth of extant and extinct deers and on the phylogenetic relationships of fossil deers is published by Mennecart et al. (2017).
- Deer fossil (almost complete humerus) is reported from the late Miocene sedimentary sequence of the Bira Formation at Hagal Stream (western margin of the Jordan Valley, Israel) by Rozenbaum et al. (2017), representing the first record of a terrestrial mammal reported from the sequence.
- An ossicone and postcranial remains of giraffes of uncertain specific assignment are described from the Miocene of the Potwar Plateau (Pakistan) by Danowitz, Barry & Solounias (2017).
- Mouflon bones are reported from the late Pleistocene of eastern Jordan by Yeomans, Martin & Richter (2017).
- A study on the diet of the Miocene bovid Hezhengia bohlini as indicated by enamel microwear is published by Semprebon, Solounias & Tao (2017).
- A study on the timing of bison arrival in North America as indicated by mitochondrial genomes extracted from fossil specimens is published by Froese et al. (2017).
- A study on the phylogenetic relationships of the Pleistocene species Bison schoetensacki as indicated by recovered ancient DNA is published by Palacio et al. (2017).
- Partial skeleton of a bison related to the steppe bison is described from the middle Holocene (~ 5,400 years ago) of Yukon (Canada) by Zazula et al. (2017), confirming local survival of northern steppe bison populations into the Holocene.
- Description of new dental remains of the anthracothere Hemimeryx blanfordi from Late Oligocene deposits of the Bugti Hills (Chitarwata Formation, Pakistan), representing the first undisputed Oligocene occurrence of the species, and a study on the molar enamel microstructure and the phylogenetic relationships of the species is published by Lihoreau et al. (2017).
- Description of the bony labyrinth of two Eocene (Lutetian) protocetid specimens from Kpogamé (Togo) and a study on the implications of the anatomy of the specimens for the hearing abilities of early whales is published by Mourlam & Orliac (2017).
- A detailed description of the holotype specimen of Cynthiacetus peruvianus and a study on the phylogenetic relationships of archaeocetes (especially basilosaurids) is published by Martínez-Cáceres, Lambert & de Muizon (2017).
- A study on the anatomy of the inner ear of Oligocene mammalodontid and aetiocetid cetaceans and their ability to detect low frequencies is published by Park et al. (2017).
- New Oligo-Miocene eomysticetid specimens are described from New Zealand by Boessenecker & Fordyce (2017), including a member of the genus Waharoa from the earliest Miocene (the most recent eomysticetid specimen reported so far).
- Five xenorophid specimens (four specimens belonging to the species Albertocetus meffordorum and one member of the genus Echovenator) are described from the Oligocene of North and South Carolina (United States) by Boessenecker, Ahmed & Geisler (2017).
- Two teeth of a large toothed whale from the group Physeteroidea (belonging or related to the genus Zygophyseter) are described from the Middle or Upper Miocene of Netherlands by Reumer, Mens & Post (2017).
- A study on the phylogenetic relationships of Araeodelphis natator (Miocene relative of the South Asian river dolphin) is published by Godfrey, Barnes & Lambert (2017).
- A study of the fossil record of the mysticetes, testing when and how gigantism evolved in mysticetes, is published by Slater, Goldbogen & Pyenson (2017).
- A study on the teeth sharpness and function in archaic mysticetes is published by Hocking et al. (2017).
- Exceptionally preserved baleen apparatus of Piscobalaena nana from the Miocene Pisco Formation (Peru) is described by Marx et al. (2017).
- Pygmy right whale fossils are described from the Pleistocene of Italy and Japan by Tsai et al. (2017).
- A study on the anatomy and phylogenetic relationships of the Miocene balaenid Morenocetus parvus is published by Buono et al. (2017).
- A partial skull of a right whale (a member or a relative of the genus Eubalaena) is described from the Pliocene Tjörnes Formation (Iceland) by Field et al. (2017).
- A Miocene breeding site for Parietobalaena yamaokai known from Itahashi Formation (Japan) is reported by Tsai (2017).
- The oldest known fossil of a fin whale (a tympanic bulla) is described from the Early Pleistocene of Northern California by Tsai & Boessenecker (2017).
- A study on the correlates between the morphology of the calcaneum and the locomotor mode in extant carnivorans, and their implications for determining the locomotor mode in extinct carnivorans and creodonts, is published by Panciroli et al. (2017).
- A study on the morphology of the primary teeth and teeth eruption sequence in hyainailouroid hyaenodonts is published by Borths & Stevens (2017).
- A study on the anatomy of the bony labyrinth of Hyaenodon exiguus and its implications for the paleobiology of the species is published by Pfaff et al. (2017).
- An incus of Hyaenodon (the first known auditory ossicle of this genus and of any hyaenodont mammal so far) is described and compared to a large set of includes of extant carnivorans by Bastl, Nagel & Solé (2017).
- A study on the frequency of traumatic injuries across skeletal elements in the saber-toothed cat Smilodon fatalis and the dire wolf (Canis dirus) from La Brea Tar Pits is published by Brown et al. (2017).
- A revision of canid fossils from the late Pliocene site of Kvabebi (Georgia), revealing the co-occurrence of members of the genera Nyctereutes, Eucyon and Vulpes, is published by Rook et al. (2017).
- A study on the morphological adaptations linked to grasping and digging ability, substrate preference and locomotory mode in the forelimb of Cyonasua is published by Tarquini et al. (2017).
- A reevaluation of the Miocene mustelid Hadrictis fricki is published by Valenciano et al. (2017), who consider Hadrictis to be a junior synonym of the genus Eomellivora and transfer H. fricki to the genus Eomellivora.
- An upper carnassial of the tayra (Eira barbara) is described from the Late Pleistocene of Entre Ríos (Argentina) by Schiaffini et al. (2017).
- Fossil otter Enhydritherium terraenovae is reported from the late Miocene deposits of Juchipila Basin (Mexico) by Tseng et al. (2017).
- A study on the mandibular feeding capability of the fossil otter Siamogale melilutra is published by Tseng et al. (2017).
- Teeth and humerus of the fossil otter Lutra simplicidens are described from the early Middle Pleistocene site of Voigtstedt (Germany) by Cherin (2017).
- A description of the skull and neck morphology and a study on the feeding behaviour of the bear dog Magericyon anceps is published by Siliceo et al. (2017).
- A revision of the fossil bear species "Ursus" abstrusus Bjork (1970) based on new remains from the Pliocene of Ellesmere Island (Nunavut, Canada) is published by Wang et al. (2017), who transfer this species to the genus Protarctos.
- A study on the absolute and relative brain size of the cave bear (Ursus spelaeus), comparing it with brain size of extant bear species, an on potential variables affecting their brain size evolution is published by Veitschegger (2017).
- A study estimating the extinction time of the cave bear and Ursus ingressus is published by Mackiewicz et al. (2017).
- A revision and a study on the phylogenetic relationships of the Miocene earless seals assigned to the genera Prophoca and Leptophoca is published by Dewaele, Lambert & Louwye (2017).
- A skull of Hyaenictis aff. almerai, representing the most complete European specimen of the genus, is described from the Miocene of Spain by Vinuesa et al. (2017).
- A study on the dietary ecology of the Pleistocene hyena Crocuta crocuta ultima from China, evaluating its similarity to the dietary ecology of the extant spotted hyena, is published by DeSantis et al. (2017).
- A study on the evolution of the fore- and hindlimbs of sabretooth carnivorans is published by Martín-Serra, Figueirido & Palmqvist (2017).
- A study on the growth of forelimb bones of Smilodon fatalis as indicated by the anatomy of specimens recovered from the La Brea Tar Pits is published by Long et al. (2017).
- Paijmans et al. (2017) present partial mitochondrial genomes of Smilodon populator and members of the genus Homotherium, and identify a late Pleistocene (~28,000 years old) mandible recovered from the Brown Bank region in the North Sea as a fossil of a member of the genus Homotherium.
- A study on the phylogenetic relationships of "Felis" pamiri Ozansoy (1959) from the late Miocene of Turkey is published by Geraads & Peigné (2017).
- A study on the braincase anatomy of the American lion (Panthera atrox) is published by Cuff, Stockey & Goswami (2017).
- Cuff, Goswami & Hutchinson (2017) estimate the size of the musculature of the limbs and vertebral column of the American lion.
- Fossils of a large felid from the late Pleistocene localities at southern Chile and Argentina are interpreted as fossils of the American lion by Chimento & Agnolin (2017).
- A study on the tooth morphology of extant and extinct murine and non-arvicoline cricetid rodents and its implications for inferring the paleoecology of the Neogene rodents from southern France and Iberian Peninsula is published by Gomez Cano et al. (2017).
- First known fossil remains of the Ilin Island cloudrunner (Crateromys paulus) are described by Reyes et al. (2017).
- Description of new specimens of the castorid rodent Propalaeocastor irtyshensis from the Oligocene Irtysh River Formation (China and a study on the phylogenetic relationships among early castorids is published by Li et al. (2017).
- Virtual cranial endocast of the Oligocene sciurid Cedromus wilsoni is reconstructed by Bertrand, Amador-Mughal & Silcox (2017).
- The oldest known plesiadapiform skeleton (partial skeleton of Torrejonia wilsoni) is described from the early Paleocene Nacimiento Formation (New Mexico, United States) by Chester et al. (2017).
- Report on the discovery of a talus bone of Donrussellia provincialis and a study on the anatomy of this bone and on the phylogenetic relationships of this species is published by Boyer, Toussaint & Godinot (2017).
- A study on the locomotion and lifestyle of Adapis parisiensis as indicated by inner ear morphology is published by Bernardi & Couette (2017).
- New material attributed to Agerinia smithorum, consisting of isolated teeth and a fragment of calcaneus, is described from the Eocene locality of Casa Retjo-1 (Spain) by Femenias-Gual et al. (2017).
- Jaws referred to the species Notharctus tenebrosus are described from the middle Eocene Sheep Pass Formation (Nevada, United States) by Perry, Gunnell & Emry (2017).
- The first known nearly complete female skull of the gelada subspecies Theropithecus oswaldi leakeyi is described from the Pleistocene site of Makuyuni (Tanzania) by Frost et al. (2017).
- A study on the anatomy of the teeth of Mesopithecus pentelicus and its implication for dietary preferences of members of the species is published by Thiery et al. (2017).
- New fossil material of Krishnapithecus krishnaii is described from the late Miocene of Himachal Pradesh (India) by Sankhyan, Kelley & Harrison (2017), who confirm the pliopithecoid affinities of the species.
- A study on the morphology of the teeth and jaws of Morotopithecus bishopi and Afropithecus turkanensis, indicating them to be likely distinct species with dissimilar feeding adaptations, is published by Deane (2017).
- A study on the phylogenetic relationships of Graecopithecus, indicating its possible affinity with hominins (humans and their non-ape ancestors), is published by Fuss et al. (2017); a different analysis, aiming to refute the hypothesis that Graecopithecus is a member of the hominin clade, is subsequently published by Benoit & Thackeray (2017).
- A study on the age of the fossils of Graecopithecus freybergi, and on the environmental conditions under which it thrived, is published by Böhme et al. (2017).
- Putative tetrapod footprints with hominin-like characteristics are described from the late Miocene of Crete (Greece) by Gierliński et al. (2017); the study is subsequently criticized by Meldrum & Sarmiento (2018) in regards to the interpretation of the putative footprints and by Zachariasse & Lourens (2022) in regards to their age.
- A study on the evolution of body mass and stature of hominins is published by Will, Pablos & Stock (2017).
- Partial skeleton of Australopithecus afarensis, preserving all seven neck vertebrae and 12 rib-bearing vertebrae (like humans, rather than 13 like African apes) is described from Dikika (Ethiopia) by Ward et al. (2017).
- New fossils attributable to the species Australopithecus anamensis are described from Kanapoi (Kenya) by Ward, Plavcan & Manthi (2017).
- A study on the skeletal maturation of Australopithecus sediba is published by Cameron et al. (2017).
- A study on the morphology of the holotype skull of Australopithecus sediba and its implications for the phylogenetic relationships of the species is published by Kimbel & Rak (2017).
- A study on the aridity in eastern Africa over the past 4.4 million years as indicated by oxygen isotope ratios in fossil herbivore tooth enamel, and on its implications for inferring the role of climate in shaping early hominin environments, is published by Blumenthal et al. (2017).
- A study on the environmental changes in the lower Awash Valley and Turkana Basin from 3.5 to 1 million years ago (with a focus on the latest Pliocene) based on new analyses of mammal communities and new stable carbon isotope data for mammalian tooth enamel, including that of the earliest members of the genus Homo, is published by Robinson et al. (2017).
- A study on the modified mammalian bones from the Plio–Pleistocene of Ethiopia is published by Sahle, El Zaatari & White (2017), who interpret the marks on some of these bones as more likely to be produced by crocodiles than by hominids using stone tools.
- A study on the knapping skills of the hominins inhabiting North China during early Pleistocene as indicated by stone tools from the Donggutuo locality is published by Yang et al. (2017).
- A study on the phylogenetic relationships of Homo floresiensis is published by Argue et al. (2017).
- A study on the age of the fossils of Homo naledi is published by Dirks et al. (2017).
- New fossils of Homo naledi are described from the Lesedi Chamber of the Rising Star Cave system by Hawks et al. (2017).
- A study on the phylogenetic relationships of Homo naledi as indicated by skull morphology is published by Schroeder et al. (2017).
- Studies on the anatomy of the skeleton of Homo naledi are published by Laird et al. (2017), Williams et al. (2017), Feuerriegel et al. (2017) and Marchi et al. (2017).
- A study on the location, number, and severity of fractures in the teeth of Homo naledi and their implications for the diet of the taxon is published by Towle, Irish & De Groote (2017).
- A study on the body size, proportions and absolute and relative brain size in Homo naledi is published by Garvin et al. (2017).
- A study on the tooth formation and eruption in Homo naledi is published by Cofran & Walker (2017).
- A phenetic analysis of the fossils of Homo naledi is published by Neves, Bernardo & Pantaleoni (2017), who consider both Homo naledi and Australopithecus sediba to be likely junior synonyms of Homo habilis.
- A study on the age of the Vallonnet site (France) and on its implications for the knowledge of the first dispersals of members of the genus Homo during the early Pleistocene (Calabrian) in this area of Europe is published by Michel et al. (2017).
- Two skulls of archaic members of the genus Homo of uncertain phylogenetic placement are described from the Pleistocene of China by Li et al. (2017).
- A study on the affinities of the Pleistocene hominin cranium from Dali in Shaanxi Province, China is published by Athreya & Wu (2017).
- A description of a hominin skull recovered from the Aroeira cave in Portugal, dated as approximately 400,000 years old, and a study on its implications for the diversity of the Middle Pleistocene European hominins is published by Daura et al. (2017).
- A 130,000-year-old rocks interpreted as hammerstones and stone anvils, associated with remains of a mastodon (Mammut americanum) showing signs of breakage, are described from the Cerutti Mastodon site in California by Holen et al. (2017), who interpret the finding as indicating that an unidentified species of Homo reached North America during the early late Pleistocene; the study is subsequently criticized by Haynes (2017), Braje et al. (2017), Ferraro et al. (2018), Ferrell (2019) and Sutton, Parkinson & Rosen (2019).
- Traces of ancient mammalian DNA, including Neanderthal and Denisovan DNA, are identified in Pleistocene cave sediments, including those lacking skeletal remains, by Slon et al. (2017).
- A study on the evolutionary history of Neanderthals and Denisovans based on genetic data is published by Rogers, Bohlender & Huff (2017).
- Slon et al. (2017) report the retrieval of DNA from a molar of a Denisovan, considered by the authors to be one of the oldest hominin remains discovered at Denisova Cave.
- A study on the age of Neanderthal remains recovered from Vindija Cave (Croatia) is published by Devièse et al. (2017).
- Prüfer et al. (2017) sequence the genome of a Neanderthal woman known from remains found in Vindija Cave.
- Complete mtDNA is reported from a Neanderthal femur from the Hohlenstein-Stadel cave (Germany) by Posth et al. (2017), who evaluate the implications of this finding for the knowledge of the timing of genetic introgression event from African hominins into Neanderthal populations.
- A study on the growth patterns of Neanderthals based on a partial skeleton of a Neanderthal child from the El Sidrón site (Spain) is published by Rosas et al. (2017).
- A study on the genetic contribution of Neanderthals to phenotypic variation in modern humans is published by Dannemann & Kelso (2017).
- A reconstruction of the internal nasal cavity of a Neanderthal and a study comparing the breathing cycle in Neanderthals and modern humans is published by de Azevedo et al. (2017).
- A study on the hunting strategies of the Neanderthals based on data from the deer and horse remains from the Abric Romaní site (Catalonia, Spain) is published by Marín et al. (2017).
- The first genetic analysis of dental calculus from five Neanderthal individuals from El Sidrón cave in Spain, Spy Cave in Belgium and Breuil Grotta in Italy is published by Weyrich et al. (2017), who also evaluate the implications of their findings for inferring Neanderthal diet, behaviour, and disease; the authors' interpretation of their results is subsequently criticized by Charlier, Gaultier & Héry-Arnaud (2019).
- Fossils of early humans (Homo sapiens) are described from the Middle Stone Age site of Jebel Irhoud (Morocco) by Hublin et al. (2017) and their age is estimated by Richter et al. (2017).
- Teeth of modern humans recovered from the Lida Ajer cave in Sumatra (Indonesia) are dated as between 73,000 and 63,000 years old by Westaway et al. (2017).
- Artifacts recovered at Madjedbebe, a rock shelter in northern Australia, indicating that humans colonized Australia at least 65,000 years ago, are reported by Clarkson et al. (2017); their conclusions about the age of these artifacts are subsequently questioned by Allen (2017) and O'Connell et al. (2018).
- A study on the diet of the oldest anatomically modern humans from southeast Europe, based on isotopic data from human bones from the Pleistocene of Crimea, is published by Drucker et al. (2017).

=== New taxa ===
==== Xenarthrans ====
Name	Novelty	Status	Authors	Age	Unit	Location	Notes	Images
Baraguatherium	Gen. et sp. nov	Valid	Rincón et al.	Early Miocene	Castillo Formation	Venezuela	A mylodontoid sloth. The type species is Baraguatherium takumara.	
Epipeltephilus caraguensis	Sp. nov	Valid	Montoya-Sanhueza et al.	Late Miocene	Huaylas Formation	Chile	An armadillo.	
Eutatus crispianii	Sp. nov	Valid	Brambilla & Ibarra	Lujanian	Saladillo Formation	Argentina	An armadillo.	
Lumbreratherium	Gen. et sp. nov	Valid	Herrera et al.	Eocene	Lumbrera Formation	Argentina	An armadillo. The type species is L. oblitum.	
Nohochichak	Gen. et sp. nov	Valid	McDonald, Chatters & Gaudin	Late Pleistocene		Mexico	A ground sloth belonging to the family Megalonychidae. The type species is N. xibalbahkah.	
Panochthus hipsilis	Sp. nov	Valid	Zurita et al.	Pleistocene		Bolivia	A glyptodont.	
Proeocoleophorus	Gen. et sp. nov	Valid	Sedor et al.	Probably late middle Eocene	Guabirotuba Formation	Brazil	A member of Cingulata. Genus includes new species P. carlinii.	
Ronwolffia	Gen. et sp. nov	Valid	Shockey	Late Oligocene (Deseadan)	Salla Formation	Bolivia	A member of Cingulata belonging to the family Peltephilidae. Genus includes new species R. pacifica.	
Xibalbaonyx	Gen. et sp. nov	Valid	Stinnesbeck et al.	Late Pleistocene		Mexico	A ground sloth belonging to the family Megalonychidae. The type species is X. oviceps.	
Zacatzontli	Gen. et sp. nov	Valid	McDonald & Carranza-Castañeda	Late Miocene (Hemphillian)		Mexico	A ground sloth belonging to the family Megalonychidae. The type species is Z. tecolotlanensis.	

==== Afrotherians ====
Name	Novelty	Status	Authors	Age	Unit	Location	Notes	Images
Gomphotherium tassyi	Sp. nov	Valid	Wang et al.	Late middle Miocene	Hujialiang Formation	China		
Italosiren	Gen. et comb. nov	Valid	Voss, Sorbi & Domning	Oligocene (late Chattian)	Belluno Glauconitic Sandstone Formation	Italy	A member of Dugongidae; a new genus for "Halitherium" bellunense De Zigno (1875).	
Kaupitherium	Gen. et sp. et comb. nov	Valid	Voss & Hampe	Oligocene (Rupelian)	Alzey Formation; Bodenheim Formation; Böhlen Formation; Boom Clay Formation	Belgium; France; Germany; Hungary; Switzerland	A member of Dugongidae. The type species is K. gruelli; genus also includes "Halitherium" bronni Krauss (1858).	
Libysiren	Gen. et sp. nov	Valid	Domning, Heal & Sorbi	Eocene (Lutetian)		Libya	A member of Protosirenidae. Genus includes new species L. sickenbergi.	
Tetralophodon euryrostris	Sp. nov	Valid	Wang et al.	Late Miocene	Linxia Basin	China		

==== Bats ====
Name	Novelty	Status	Authors	Age	Unit	Location	Notes	Images
Amazonycteris	Gen. et sp. nov	Valid	Czaplewski & Campbell	Late Miocene	Içá Formation	Brazil	A member of the family Thyropteridae. The type species is A. divisus.	
Myotis belgicus	Sp. nov	Valid	Gunnell, Smith & Smith	Oligocene (Rupelian)	Borgloon Formation	Belgium	A mouse-eared bat.	
Pipistrellus rouresi	Sp. nov	Valid	Crespo et al.	Late Miocene		Spain	A vesper bat, a species of Pipistrellus.	
Rhinolophus antonioi	Sp. nov	Valid	Crespo et al.	Late Miocene		Spain	A horseshoe bat.	
Xylonycteris	Gen. et sp. nov	Valid	Hand & Sigé	Eocene (Ypresian)		France	A member of the family Archaeonycteridae. The type species is X. stenodon.	

==== Odd-toed ungulates ====
Name	Novelty	Status	Authors	Age	Unit	Location	Notes	Images
Haringtonhippus	Gen. et comb. nov	Valid	Heintzman et al.	Pleistocene	Lissie Formation	Canada (Yukon; Alberta?); United States (Nevada; New Mexico; Texas; Wyoming; Alaska?); Mexico?	A member of the family Equidae belonging to the subfamily Equinae and the tribe Equini; a new genus for "Equus" francisci Hay (1915).	
Lophiohippus	Gen. et comb. nov	Disputed	Bai	Eocene	Lunan Basin	China	A member of the family Palaeotheriidae belonging to the subfamily Pachynolophinae; a new genus for "Lophialetes" yunnanensis Huang & Qi (1982). Subsequently, Bai (2022) considered it a possible junior synonym of the genus Lunania.	
Orolophus	Gen. et comb. nov	Valid	Remy	Eocene		France	A palaeotheriid; a new genus for "Pachynolophus" maldani Lemoine (1878).	
Paraceratherium huangheense	Sp. nov	Valid	Li et al.	Early Oligocene	Hanjiajing Formation	China		
Pliolophus quesnoyensis	Sp. nov	Valid	Bronnert et al.	Early Eocene		France		
Samburuceros	Gen. et sp. nov	Valid	Handa et al.	Late Miocene		Kenya	A rhinoceros belonging to the tribe Elasmotheriini. Genus includes new species S. ishidai.	

==== Even-toed ungulates ====
Name	Novelty	Status	Authors	Age	Unit	Location	Notes	Images
Afrotragus	Gen. et comb. nov	Valid	Geraads	Miocene	Nawata Formation	Kenya	A member of the family Bovidae; a new genus for "Aepyceros" premelampus Harris (2003).	
Archaeopotamus qeshta	Sp. nov	Valid	Boisserie et al.	Late Miocene	Baynunah Formation	United Arab Emirates	A member of the family Hippopotamidae.	
Beatragus vrbae	Sp. nov	Valid	Bibi, Rowan & Reed	Late Pliocene		Ethiopia	A relative of the hirola	
Bubalus grovesi	Sp. nov	Valid	Rozzi	Late Pleistocene-Holocene		Indonesia	A species of Bubalus.	
Choeromorus ibericus	Sp. nov	Valid	Pickford	Miocene		France; Spain	A member of Suoidea belonging to the family Siderochoeridae.	
Choeromorus petersbuchensis	Sp. nov	Valid	Pickford	Miocene		Germany	A member of Suoidea belonging to the family Siderochoeridae.	
Chororatherium	Gen. et sp. nov	Valid	Boisserie et al.	Late Miocene		Ethiopia	A member of the family Hippopotamidae. Genus includes new species C. roobii.	
Decennatherium rex	Sp. nov	Valid	Ríos, Sánchez & Morales	Miocene (late Vallesian)		Spain	A member of the family Giraffidae.	
Grevenobos	Gen. et sp. nov	Valid	Crégut-Bonnoure & Tsoukala	Late Pliocene		Greece	A member of the family Bovidae belonging to the tribe Bovini. Genus includes new species G. antiquus.	
Merycobunodon? walshi	Sp. nov	Valid	Murphey & Kelly	Uintan	Bridger Formation	United States (Wyoming)	A member of the family Oromerycidae.	
Micromeryx? eiselei	Sp. nov	Valid	Aiglstorfer et al.	Miocene		Germany	A member of the family Moschidae, possibly a species of Micromeryx.	
Muknalia	Gen. et sp. nov	Disputed	Stinnesbeck et al.	Probably latest Pleistocene		Mexico	A peccary. The type species is M. minima. Schubert et al. (2020) considered this species to be synonymous with the collared peccary (Pecari tajacu).	
Paalitherium	Gen. et sp. nov	Valid	Métais, Mennecart & Roohi	Oligocene	Chitarwata Formation	Pakistan	A stem-pecoran. Genus includes new species P. gurki.	
Parabos savelisi	Sp. nov	Valid	Crégut-Bonnoure & Tsoukala	Pliocene		Greece	A member of the family Bovidae belonging to the tribe Boselaphini.	
Praeelaphus australorientalis	Sp. nov	Valid	Croitor	Early Pliocene		Romania; Ukraine	An Old World deer.	
Protherohyus	Gen. et comb. nov	Valid	Parisi Dutra et al.	Hemphillian		Mexico; United States	A peccary; a new genus for "Desmathyus" brachydontus Dalquest & Mooser (1980).	
Siderochoerus	Gen. et sp. nov	Valid	Pickford	Miocene		Germany	A member of Suoidea belonging to the family Siderochoeridae. Genus includes new species S. minimus.	
Turkanatragus	Gen. et sp. nov	Valid	Geraads	Miocene	Nawata Formation	Kenya	A member of the family Bovidae. The type species is T. marymuunguae.	
Urmiatherium kassandriensis	Sp. nov	Valid	Lazaridis et al.	Late Miocene		Greece	An ovibovine-like bovid.	

==== Cetaceans ====
Name	Novelty	Status	Authors	Age	Unit	Location	Notes	Images
Africanacetus gracilis	Sp. nov	Valid	Ichishima et al.	Uncertain (middle Miocene-early Pliocene)	São Paulo Ridge (offshore)	Brazil	A beaked whale.	
Beneziphius cetariensis	Sp. nov	Valid	Miján, Louwye & Lambert	Middle Miocene to early Pliocene		Spain	A beaked whale.	
Brujadelphis	Gen. et sp. nov	Valid	Lambert et al.	Miocene (Serravallian to early Tortonian)	Pisco Formation	Peru	A member of Inioidea. The type species is B. ankylorostris.	
Coronodon	Gen. et sp. nov	Valid	Geisler et al.	Oligocene (Rupelian)	Ashley Formation	United States (South Carolina)	A basal member of Mysticeti. The type species is C. havensteini.	
Dilophodelphis	Gen. et sp. nov	Valid	Boersma, McCurry & Pyenson	Miocene (early Burdigalian)	Astoria Formation	United States (Oregon)	A relative of the South Asian river dolphin. The type species is D. fordycei.	
Eubalaena ianitrix	Sp. nov	Valid	Bisconti, Lambert & Bosselaers	Pliocene (Piacenzian)	Lillo Formation	Belgium	A right whale.	
Inermorostrum	Gen. et sp. nov	Valid	Boessenecker et al.	Oligocene		United States (South Carolina)	A member of the family Xenorophidae. The type species is I. xenops.	
Inticetus	Gen. et sp. nov	Valid	Lambert et al.	Miocene (Burdigalian)	Chilcatay Formation	Peru	A dolphin of uncertain phylogenetic placement, assigned to the new family Inticetidae. The type species is I. vertizi.	
Koristocetus	Gen. et sp. nov	Valid	Collareta et al.	Miocene (latest Tortonian or Messinian)	Pisco Formation	Peru	A member of the family Kogiidae. The type species is K. pescei.	
Mystacodon	Gen. et sp. nov	Valid	Lambert et al.	Eocene (early Priabonian)	Yumaque Formation	Peru	A basal member of Mysticeti. The type species is M. selenensis.	
Olympicetus	Gen. et sp. nov	Valid	Vélez-Juarbe	Late Oligocene	Pysht Formation	United States (Washington)	A stem-odontocete. The type species is O. avitus.	
Scaldiporia	Gen. et sp. nov	Valid	Post, Louwye & Lambert	Late Miocene or earliest Pliocene	Breda Formation	Netherlands	A relative of the La Plata dolphin. The type species is S. vandokkumi.	
Tiucetus	Gen. et sp. nov	Valid	Marx, Lambert & de Muizon	Miocene (Serravallian to early Tortonian)	Pisco Formation	Peru	A member of the family Cetotheriidae. The type species is T. rosae.	
Urkudelphis	Gen. et sp. nov	Valid	Tanaka et al.	Oligocene (probably Chattian)	Dos Bocas Formation	Ecuador	A member of Platanistoidea. The type species is U. chawpipacha.	

==== Carnivorans ====
Name	Novelty	Status	Authors	Age	Unit	Location	Notes	Images
Amphictis timucua	Sp. nov	Valid	Baskin	Early Hemingfordian		United States (Florida)	A member of the family Ailuridae.	
Canis othmanii	Sp. nov	Valid	Amri et al.	Early Middle Pleistocene		Tunisia	A member of the family Canidae.	
Eotaria citrica	Sp. nov	Valid	Velez-Juarbe	Miocene (late Burdigalian to early Langhian)		United States (California)	A stem eared seal.	
Floridictis	Gen. et sp. nov	Valid	Baskin	Early Hemingfordian		United States (Florida)	A member of the family Mustelidae belonging to the subfamily Oligobuninae. Genus includes new species F. kerneri.	
Leptofelis	Gen. et comb. nov	Valid	Salesa et al.	Late Miocene		Spain	A member of the family Felidae belonging to the subfamily Felinae; a new genus for "Styriofelis" vallesiensis Salesa et al. (2012). Announced in 2017; the final version of the article naming it was published in 2019.	
Megantereon microta	Sp. nov	Valid	Zhu et al.	Early Pleistocene		China	A machairodontine felid, a species of Megantereon.	
Miomaci	Gen. et sp. nov	Valid	De Bonis et al.	Miocene (Vallesian)		Hungary	A relative of the giant panda. The type species is M. panonnicum.	
Nanophoca	Gen. et comb. nov	Valid	Dewaele et al.	Miocene	Berchem Formation; Diest Formation; Kattendijk Formation	Belgium	An earless seal; a new genus for "Phoca" vitulinoides Van Beneden (1871).	
Panthera spelaea intermedia	Subsp. nov	Valid	Argant & Brugal	Late Middle Pleistocene		France	A subspecies of the Eurasian cave lion.	
Parabrachypsalis	Gen. et sp. nov	Valid	Baskin	Early Hemingfordian		United States (Florida)	A member of the family Mustelidae belonging to the subfamily Oligobuninae. Genus includes new species P. janisae.	
Paramachaerodus transasiaticus	Sp. nov	Valid	Li & Spassov	Late Miocene		Bulgaria; China	A machairodontine felid.	
Siamogale melilutra	Sp. nov	Valid	Wang et al.	Late Miocene-Pliocene	Yushe Basin; Zhaotong Basin	China	An otter, a species of Siamogale.	
Terranectes	Gen. et 2 sp. nov	Valid	Rahmat et al.	Late Miocene	Eastover Formation; St. Marys Formation	United States (Virginia)	An earless seal belonging to the subfamily Monachinae. The type species is T. magnus; genus also includes T. parvus.	

==== Lagomorphs ====
Name	Novelty	Status	Authors	Age	Unit	Location	Notes	Images
Alilepus parvus	Sp. nov	Valid	Wu & Flynn	Late Neogene	Yushe Basin	China	A member of the family Leporidae.	
Hypolagus mazegouensis	Sp. nov	Valid	Wu & Flynn	Late Pliocene	Yushe Basin	China	A member of the family Leporidae.	
Ochotonoides teilhardi	Sp. nov	Valid	Wu & Flynn	Late Pliocene	Yushe Basin	China	A pika.	
Paludotona minor	Sp. nov	Valid	Angelone, Čermák & Rook	Miocene (Turolian)		Italy	A member of Lagomorpha of uncertain phylogenetic placement.	
Sericolagus yushecus	Sp. nov	Valid	Wu & Flynn	Late Neogene	Yushe Basin	China	A member of the family Leporidae.	
Sinolagomys badamae	Sp. nov	Valid	Erbajeva et al.	Late Oligocene		Mongolia	A pika.	

==== Rodents ====
Name	Novelty	Status	Authors	Age	Unit	Location	Notes	Images
Acarechimys pascuali	Sp. nov	Valid	Verzi, Olivares & Morgan	Early Miocene (Santacrucian)	Santa Cruz Formation	Argentina	A stem-abrocomid, a species of Acarechimys.	
Acritoparamys naomugengensis	Sp. nov	Valid	Li, Mao & Wang	Eocene	Erlian Basin	China	A member of the family Ischyromyidae.	
Allactaga fru	Sp. nov	Valid	Nesin & Kovalchuk	Miocene (early Turolian)		Ukraine	A jerboa, a species of Allactaga.	
Allocricetus primitivus	Sp. nov	Valid	Wu & Flynn	Pliocene	Yushe Basin	China	A hamster.	
Altasciurus	Gen. et comb. nov	Valid	Korth & Tabrum	Oligocene (Orellan to Whitneyan)		United States (Colorado; Montana; Nebraska; South Dakota; Wyoming)	A member of the family Aplodontidae belonging to the subfamily Prosciurinae. The type species is "Paramys" relictus Cope (1873); genus also includes A. albiclivus (Korth, 1994) and A. clausulus (Korth, 2009).	
Ameghinomys	Gen. et comb. nov	Valid	Verzi, Olivares & Morgan	Early Miocene		Argentina	A stem-abrocomid; a new genus for "Acarechimys" constans (Ameghino, 1887).	
Apeomys asiaticus	Sp. nov	Valid	Qiu	Late Early Miocene	Xiacaowan Formation	China	A member of the family Eomyidae.	
Apeomys oldrichi	Sp. nov	Valid	Mörs & Flink	Early Miocene		Germany	A member of the family Eomyidae.	
Apocricetus darderi	Sp. nov	Valid	Torres-Roig et al.	Pliocene (Zanclean)		Spain	A member of the family Cricetidae.	
Argyromys cicigei	Sp. nov	Valid	López-Guerrero et al.	Late Oligocene		China; Mongolia	A member of the family Cricetidae.	
Cardiomys leufuensis	Sp. nov	Valid	Pérez, Deschamps & Vucetich	Late Miocene (Chasicoan)	Arroyo Chasicó Formation	Argentina	A relative of the capybara.	
Cavia cabrerai	Sp. nov	Valid	Candela & Bonini	Miocene–Pliocene boundary	Andalhuala Formation	Argentina	A species of Cavia (a relative of the guinea pig).	
Caviodon andalhualensis	Sp. nov	Valid	Pérez, Deschamps & Vucetich	Miocene (Messinian)	Andalhuala Formation	Argentina	A relative of the capybara.	
Collimys caucasicus	Sp. nov	Valid	Tesakov in Tesakov et al.	Miocene (Turolian)		Russia (Adygea)	A member of the family Cricetidae.	
Cricetinus mesolophidos	Sp. nov	Valid	Wu & Flynn	Pliocene	Yushe Basin	China	A hamster.	
Cricetodon goklerensis	Sp. nov	Valid	Joniak et al.	Early Miocene		Turkey		
Cricetops auster	Sp. nov	Valid	Li et al.	Early Oligocene	Caijiachong Formation	China	A muroid rodent, a species of Cricetops.	
Debruijnia kostakii	Sp. nov	Valid	De Bruijn	Early Miocene		Greece	A member of Spalacinae.	
Democricetodon fejfari	Sp. nov	Valid	Lindsay	Middle Miocene		India Pakistan	A member of the family Cricetidae.	
Democricetodon haltmari	Sp. nov	Valid	Joniak et al.	Early Miocene		Turkey		
Desmodillus magnus	Sp. nov	Valid	Denys & Matthews	Early Pliocene	Varswater Formation	South Africa	A relative of the Cape short-eared gerbil.	
Eobranisamys javierpradoi	Sp. nov	Valid	Boivin et al.	Late middle Eocene	Pozo Formation	Peru	A member of Caviomorpha belonging to the superfamily Cavioidea.	
Eomys helveticus	Sp. nov	Valid	Engesser & Kälin	Oligocene (Chattian)		Switzerland	A member of the family Eomyidae.	
Eomys schluneggeri	Sp. nov	Valid	Engesser & Kälin	Oligocene (Chattian)		Switzerland	A member of the family Eomyidae.	
Eumyarion lukasi	Sp. nov	Valid	Joniak et al.	Early Miocene		Turkey		
Extrarius	Gen. et sp. nov	Valid	Erten	Quaternary	Tosunlar Formation	Turkey	A member of the family Muridae. The type species is E. orhuni.	
Ferigolomys	Gen. et sp. nov	Valid	Kerber et al.	Late Miocene	Solimões Formation	Brazil	A member of Dinomyidae. Genus includes new species F. pacarana.	
Germanomys progressiva	Sp. nov	Valid	Wu & Flynn	Pliocene	Mazegou Formation	China	A member of Arvicolinae.	
Germanomys yusheica	Sp. nov	Valid	Wu & Flynn	Pliocene	Gaozhuang Formation	China	A member of Arvicolinae.	
Glirudinus matusi	Sp. nov	Valid	Joniak et al.	Early Miocene		Turkey		
Heosminthus nomogenesis	Sp. nov	Valid	Li, Gong & Wang	Late Eocene		China	A member of Dipodidae.	
Hispanomys romeroi	Sp. nov	Valid	Piñero & Agustí			Spain	A member of the family Cricetidae.	
Hydrochoeropsis wayuu	Sp. nov	Valid	Pérez et al.	Late Pliocene	Ware Formation; Cocinetas Basin	Colombia	A member of Hydrochoerinae.	
Hylopetes yuncuensis	Sp. nov	Valid	Qiu	Late Neogene	Yushe Basin	China	A squirrel, a species of Hylopetes.	
Inopinatia	Gen. et sp. nov	Valid	Marković et al.	Early Oligocene		Serbia	A member of the family Diatomyidae. The type species is I. balkanica.	
Karnimata fejfari	Sp. nov	Valid	Kimura, Flynn & Jacobs	Late Miocene	Nagri Formation	Pakistan	A member of the family Muridae.	
Latocricetodon	Gen. et comb. nov	Valid	Joniak et al.	Early Miocene		Turkey	A new genus for "Spanocricetodon" sinuosus Theocharopoulos (2000).	
Lophicylindrodon	Gen. et sp. nov	Valid	Korth & Tabrum	Oligocene (Whitneyan)		United States (Montana)	A member of the family Cylindrodontidae. The type species is L. expiratus.	
Metanoiamys norejkoi	Sp. nov	Valid	Korth & Tabrum	Possibly Chadronian	Beaverhead Basin	United States (Montana)	A member of the family Eomyidae.	
Milimonggamys	Gen. et sp. nov		Turvey et al.	Late Holocene		Indonesia	A member of the family Muridae belonging to the subfamily Murinae and the tribe Rattini. The type species is M. juliae.	
Montanacastor	Gen. et sp. nov	Valid	Korth & Tabrum	Oligocene (Whitneyan)		United States (Montana)	A member of the family Castoridae. The type species is M. simplicidens.	
Mubhammys atlanticus	Sp. nov	Valid	Marivaux et al.	Oligocene (earliest Rupelian)	Upper Samlat Formation	Western Sahara	A member of Phiomorpha of uncertain phylogenetic placement.	
Neocometes magna	Sp. nov	Valid	Qiu & Jin	Probably Miocene		China	A member of the family Platacanthomyidae.	
Neocometes sinensis	Sp. nov	Valid	Qiu & Jin	Probably Miocene		China	A member of the family Platacanthomyidae.	
Neophiomys minutus	Sp. nov	Valid	Marivaux et al.	Oligocene (earliest Rupelian)	Upper Samlat Formation	Western Sahara	A member of Phiomorpha of uncertain phylogenetic placement.	
Orelladjidaumo exiguus	Sp. nov	Valid	Korth & Tabrum	Oligocene (Whitneyan)		United States (Montana)	A member of the family Eomyidae.	
Palaeocavia? mawka	Sp. nov	Valid	Madozzo-Jaén & Pérez	Late Miocene	Chiquimil Formation	Argentina	A member of Caviinae, possibly a species of Palaeocavia.	
Parapodemus badgleyae	Sp. nov	Valid	Kimura, Flynn & Jacobs	Late Miocene	Nagri Formation	Pakistan	A member of the family Muridae.	
Phenacophiomys	Gen. et sp. nov	Valid	Marivaux et al.	Oligocene (earliest Rupelian)	Upper Samlat Formation	Western Sahara	A member of the family Phiomyidae. The type species is P. occidentalis.	
Plesiosminthus margaritae	Sp. nov	Valid	Freudenthal & Martín-Suárez	Late Oligocene		Spain	A member of the family Dipodidae.	
Plesiosminthus moniqueae	Sp. nov	Valid	Freudenthal & Martín-Suárez	Late Oligocene		France	A member of the family Dipodidae.	
Pliosiphneus antiquus	Sp. nov	Valid	Zheng	Late Neogene	Gaozhuang Formation	China	A zokor.	
Pozomys	Gen. et sp. nov	Valid	Boivin et al.	Late middle Eocene	Pozo Formation	Peru	A member of Caviomorpha of uncertain phylogenetic placement. The type species is P. ucayaliensis.	
Priusaulax wilsoni	Sp. nov	Valid	Korth	Miocene (Hemingfordian)	Pawnee Creek Formation; Runningwater Formation	United States (Colorado; Nebraska; Wyoming)	A member of the family Castoridae.	
Progonomys morganae	Sp. nov	Valid	Kimura, Flynn & Jacobs	Late Miocene	Nagri Formation	India; Pakistan	A member of the family Muridae belonging to the subfamily Murinae. Originally described as a species of Progonomys, but subsequently made the type species of the separate genus Maneramus.	
Proischyromys	Gen. et sp. nov	Valid	Samuels & Korth	Eocene (Chadronian)	John Day Formation	United States (Oregon)	A member of the family Ischyromyidae. The type species is P. perditus.	
Raksasamys	Gen. et sp. nov		Turvey et al.	Late Holocene		Indonesia	A member of the family Muridae belonging to the subfamily Murinae and the tribe Rattini. The type species is R. tikusbesar.	
Sayimys sihongensis	Sp. nov	Valid	Qiu	Late Early Miocene	Xiacaowan Formation	China	A gundi.	
Sciuravus inclinatus	Sp. nov	Valid	Anderson	Bridgerian	Bridger Formation	United States (Wyoming)	A member of the family Sciuravidae.	
Sciuravus metalinguas	Sp. nov	Valid	Anderson	Bridgerian	Bridger Formation	United States (Wyoming)	A member of the family Sciuravidae.	
Sciuravus nexus	Sp. nov	Valid	Anderson	Bridgerian	Bridger Formation	United States (Wyoming)	A member of the family Sciuravidae.	
Spalax denizliensis	Sp. nov	Valid	Erten	Early Pleistocene	Tosunlar Formation	Turkey	A species of Spalax.	
Spurimus hoffmani	Sp. nov	Valid	Korth & Tabrum	Possibly Chadronian	Beaverhead Basin	United States (Montana)	A member of the family Ischyromyidae.	
Tedfordomys	Gen. et sp. nov	Valid	Wu, Flynn & Qiu	Late Miocene	Gaozhuang Formation; Mahui Formation	China	A member of Murinae. The type species is T. jinensis.	
Willeumys argosorus	Sp. nov	Valid	Korth & Tabrum	Oligocene (Whitneyan)		United States (Montana)	A member of the family Cricetidae belonging to the subfamily Eumyinae.	
Yuneomys	Gen. et comb. nov	Valid	Qiu	Late Miocene	Shihuiba Formation	China	A member of the family Eomyidae; a new genus for "Leptodontomys" pusillus Qiu (2006).	
Yuomys altunensis	Sp. nov	Valid	Wang	Middle Eocene	Xishuigou Formation	China	A relative of the gundis.	
Yuomys magnus	Sp. nov	Valid	Li	Eocene		China	A relative of the gundis.	

==== Primates ====
Name	Novelty	Status	Authors	Age	Unit	Location	Notes	Images
Agerinia marandati	Sp. nov	Valid	Femenias-Gual et al.	Early Eocene	Corçà Formation	Spain		
Kalepithecus kogolensis	Sp. nov	Valid	Pickford et al.	Miocene		Uganda	A small ape.	
Masradapis	Gen. et sp. nov	Valid	Seiffert et al.	Late Eocene	Birket Qarun Formation	Egypt	A member of Adapiformes belonging to the subfamily Caenopithecinae. The type species is M. tahai.	
Microchoerus hookeri	Sp. nov	Valid	Minwer-Barakat et al.	Late Eocene		Spain	A member of Omomyidae.	
Mioeuoticus kichotoi	Sp. nov	Valid	Kunimatsu et al.	Early Middle Miocene	Aka Aiteputh Formation	Kenya	A member of the family Lorisidae.	
Nyanzapithecus alesi	Sp. nov	Valid	Nengo et al.	Middle Miocene		Kenya	An ape.	
Ramadapis	Gen. et sp. nov	Valid	Gilbert et al.	Miocene		India	A member of Sivaladapidae. The type species is R. sahnii.	

==== Other eutherians ====
Name	Novelty	Status	Authors	Age	Unit	Location	Notes	Images
Bharatlestes	Gen. et sp. nov	Valid	Kapur et al.	Early Eocene	Cambay Shale Formation	India	A member of the family Adapisoriculidae. Genus includes new species B. kalamensis.	
Carpolestes twelvemilensis	Sp. nov	Valid	Mattingly, Sanisidro & Beard	Paleocene (late Tiffanian)		United States (Wyoming)	A member of Plesiadapiformes.	
Crustulus	Gen. et sp. nov	Valid	Clemens	Paleocene (latest Puercan)	Tullock Member of the Fort Union Formation	United States (Montana)	Probably a member of Pantodonta. The type species is C. fontanus.	
Deinogalerix samniticus	Sp. nov	Valid	Savorelli et al.	Miocene (Tortonian)	Lithothamnion Limestone	Italy	A gymnure.	
Durlstodon	Gen. et sp. nov	Valid	Sweetman, Smith & Martill	Early Cretaceous (Berriasian)	Purbeck Group	United Kingdom	An early eutherian of uncertain phylogenetic placement. The type species is D. ensomi.	Durlstotherium (A), Durlstodon (B)
Durlstotherium	Gen. et sp. nov	Valid	Sweetman, Smith & Martill	Early Cretaceous (Berriasian)	Purbeck Group	United Kingdom	An early eutherian of uncertain phylogenetic placement. The type species is D. newmani.	Durlstotherium (A), Durlstodon (B)
Entomolestes westgatei	Sp. nov	Valid	Murphey & Kelly	Uintan	Bridger Formation	United States (Wyoming)	A member of the family Erinaceidae.	
Exiguodon	Gen. et comb. nov	Valid	Morales & Pickford	Early Miocene		Kenya; Uganda	A member of Hyaenodonta belonging to the group Hyainailourinae. The type species is "Hyaenodon" pilgrimi Savage (1965).	
Falcatodon	Gen. et comb. nov	Valid	Morales & Pickford	Oligocene (Rupelian)	Jebel Qatrani Formation	Egypt	A member of Hyaenodonta belonging to the group Hyainailourinae. The type species is "Metapterodon" schlosseri Holroyd (1999).	
Hapalodectes lopatini	Sp. nov	Valid	Solé et al.	Middle Paleocene	Upper Doumu Formation	China	A hapalodectid mesonychian.	
Masrasector nananubis	Sp. nov	Valid	Borths & Seiffert	Eocene (latest Priabonian)	Jebel Qatrani Formation	Egypt	A member of Hyaenodonta belonging to the group Hyainailouroidea and the subfamily Teratodontinae.	
Notiolofos regueroi	Sp. nov	Valid	Gelfo, López & Santillana	Eocene (Ypresian)	La Meseta Formation	Antarctica	A member of Litopterna belonging to the family Sparnotheriodontidae.	
Nyctitherium gunnelli	Sp. nov	Valid	Murphey & Kelly	Uintan	Bridger Formation	United States (Wyoming)	A member of Soricomorpha belonging to the family Nyctitheriidae.	
Pakakali	Gen. et sp. nov	Valid	Borths & Stevens	Late Oligocene	Nsungwe Formation	Tanzania	A member of Hyaenodonta belonging to the group Hyainailouroidea. The type species is P. rukwaensis.	
Pampahippus powelli	Sp. nov	Valid	García-López, Deraco & del Papa	Eocene	Quebrada de los Colorados Formation	Argentina	A notoungulate.	
Percymygale	Gen. et comb. nov	Valid	Hugueney & Maridet	Late Eocene to early Miocene		Czech Republic; France; Germany; United Kingdom	A member of Talpidae belonging to the tribe Urotrichini. The type species is "Myxomygale" minor Ziegler (1990); genus also includes "Myxomygale" vauclusensis Crochet (1995).	
Plesiodimylus ilercavonicus	Sp. nov	Valid	Crespo et al.	Early Miocene		Spain	A member of Dimylidae.	
Plesiosorex fejfari	Sp. nov	Valid	Oshima, Tomida & Orihara	Early Miocene	Nakamura Formation	Japan	A member of Eulipotyphla belonging to the family Plesiosoricidae.	
Protypotherium colloncurensis	Sp. nov	Valid	Nardoni, Reguero & González Ruiz	Miocene (Colloncuran)	Collón Cura Formation	Argentina	An interatheriid notoungulate.	
Sectisodon	Gen. et sp. et comb. nov	Valid	Morales & Pickford	Oligocene and Early Miocene		Egypt; Uganda	A member of Hyaenodonta belonging to the group Hyainailourinae. The type species is S. occultus; genus also includes "Metapterodon" markgrafi Holroyd (1999).	
Taizimylus	Gen. et sp. nov	Valid	Mao et al.	Late Paleocene		China	A stem-rodent belonging to the family Eurymylidae. The type species is T. tongi.	
Tegulariscaptor	Gen. et comb. nov	Valid	Sansalone et al.	Early Oligocene		Germany	A member of Talpidae; a new genus for "Geotrypus" minor Ziegler (2012).	
Xotodon maimarensis	Sp. nov	Valid	Bonini et al.	Late Miocene–early Pliocene	Maimará Formation	Argentina	A toxodontid notoungulate.	
Yanshuella yushensis	Sp. nov	Valid	Flynn & Wu	Late Neogene	Yushe Basin	China	A mole belonging to the tribe Scalopini.	

== Other mammals ==
=== Research ===
- A study on the ancestral activity patterns of mammals inferred from the activity patterns of extant mammals is published by Maor et al. (2017), who argue that mammals most likely originated from ancestors which remained nocturnal throughout the Mesozoic until either shortly before the Cretaceous–Paleogene extinction event or just after it (considered more likely by the authors).
- A study on the evolution of jaw muscles across the cynodont–mammaliaform transition is published by Lautenschlager et al. (2017).
- A study on the morphological changes to the jaw processes in the evolution of Mesozoic mammals (especially early cladotherians) and their implications for changes to the jaw muscle vectors and jaw rotation is published by Grossnickle (2017).
- Tracks of a small hopping mammal trackmaker are described from the Early Cretaceous Jinju Formation (South Korea) by Kim et al. (2017), who name a new ichnotaxon Koreasaltipes jinjuensis belonging to the morphofamily Ameghinichnidae.
- Tracks of a raccoon-sized mammaliaform representing the morphofamily Ameghinichnidae are described from the Early Cretaceous (late Aptian) Calonda Formation (Angola) by Mateus et al. (2017), who name a new ichnotaxon Catocapes angolanus.
- New specimen of the morganucodontan species Wareolestes rex (partial dentary) is described from the Middle Jurassic Kilmaluag Formation (Scotland) by Panciroli, Benson & Walsh (2017).
- A description of the morphology of the postcranial skeleton of Yanoconodon allini and a study on its implications for the posture and locomotion of members of this species is published by Chen, Luo & Wilson (2017).
- New fossil material of members of the genus Gobiconodon is described from the Early Cretaceous of Mongolia by Lopatin (2017).
- A multituberculate femur is described from the Upper Cretaceous (Maastrichtian) Maevarano Formation (Madagascar) by Krause, Hoffmann & Werning (2017), confirming the presence of multituberculates on Gondwana.
- A study on the anatomy of the skull of Necrolestes patagonensis, with emphasis on its adaptations to a fossorial lifestyle, is published by Wible & Rougier (2017).
- Vertebrae and fragmentary elements of the fore- and hindlimb of therian mammals are described from the Upper Cretaceous (Turonian) Bissekty Formation (Uzbekistan) by Averianov & Archibald (2017).

=== New taxa ===
Name	Novelty	Status	Authors	Age	Unit	Location	Notes	Images
Arboroharamiya allinhopsoni	Sp. nov	Valid	Han et al.	Late Jurassic (Oxfordian)	Tiaojishan Formation	China	A member of Euharamiyida belonging to the family Arboroharamiyidae.	
Baidabatyr	Gen. et sp. nov	Valid	Averianov et al.	Early Cretaceous	Ilek Formation	Russia	A multituberculate of uncertain phylogenetic placement. The type species is B. clivosus.	
Fluctuodon	Gen. et sp. nov	Valid	Debuysschere	Late Triassic (Rhaetian)		France	A member of Kuehneotheriidae. The type species is F. necmergor.	
Kuehneotherium stanislavi	Sp. nov	Valid	Debuysschere	Late Triassic (Rhaetian)		France; Luxembourg	A member of Kuehneotheriidae.	
Maiopatagium	Gen. et sp. nov	Valid	Meng et al.	Late Jurassic (Oxfordian)	Tiaojishan Formation	China	A member of Haramiyida belonging to the group Eleutherodontida. The type species is M. furculiferum.	
Vilevolodon	Gen. et sp. nov	Valid	Luo et al.	Late Jurassic (Oxfordian)	Tiaojishan Formation	China	A member of Haramiyida belonging to the family Eleutherodontidae. The type species is V. diplomylos.	
