= Magnetic field reversal =

Magnetic field reversal may refer to:

- Geomagnetic reversal
  - Brunhes–Matuyama reversal, approximately 780,000 years ago
  - Gauss-Matuyama reversal, approximately 2.588 million years ago
  - Jaramillo reversal, approximately one million years ago
  - Laschamp event, a short reversal that occurred 41,000 years ago
- Reversal of the solar magnetic field
- Magnetization reversal, a process leading to a 180° reorientation of the magnetization vector with respect to its initial direction
- Polarity reversal (seismology), a local amplitude seismic anomaly

== See also ==
- Geomagnetic excursion
- Polarity chron
- Pole shift hypothesis
- True polar wander
