= Grotte du Vallonnet =

Cave and archaeological site in France

- Grotte du Vallonnet
- Vallonnet cave
- location in France Grotte du Vallonnet (France)
- 43°45′51″N 7°28′11″E
- Location: near Roquebrune-Cap-Martin, between Monaco and Menton
- Region: Alpes-Maritimes Department, France

Site notes
- Excavation dates: 1962

Grotte du Vallonnet is an archaeological site located in the municipality of Roquebrune-Cap-Martin, between Monaco and Menton, in France, that was first discovered in 1958. Stone tools found at the site have been dated to c. 1.2 million years old, making it one of the earliest sites of human settlement known in Europe.

== Description ==
The cave of Vallonnet is located on the western slope of Cap Martin, about 110 m (360 ft) above the Bay of Menton, at Roquebrune-Cap-Martin in the Alpes-Maritimes Department in France. It opens onto a ravine with a small creek, the Vallonnet, which drops down to the bay. The mountain is a massif of calcite-dolomitic rock formed during the Jurassic period, covered with puddingstone and hardened sands of the Miocene. The porch of the cave is narrow and low, and opens to a corridor 5 m (16 ft) in length, followed by a 4 m (13 ft) high room. The cave is not accessible to the public. Findings from the cave can be viewed in the Regional Prehistory Museum in Menton.

== Discovery ==
The cave was discovered in 1958 by 13 year old Marianne Poire, who regularly visited the cave to collect pieces of calcite and one day showed them to René Pascal, an employee of a Monte Carlo casino and an amateur prehistorian. Marianne then led her parents, Pascal and others to the entry of the cave. The first systematic excavations were carried out in 1962.

=== Layers of sediment ===
The excavations found five distinct layers of sediment in the cave:

1. Layer I was a floor of stalagmites, which could be dated between 1.4 and 1.370 million years BC. Analysis of the pollen found in this layer showed it was located in a forested landscape, where platanes were dominant.
2. Layer II was composed of beach sand, mixed with seashells and fish bones, dated to a little over 1.05 million years. The types of fish bones found showed that at this time the cave was washed by a tropical or subtropical sea. The pollen found indicated that the landscape had been covered with pine forest, and that the climate at that time was relatively warm, with mild winters.
3. Layer III was the thickest layer (1.5 metres) composed of sand mixed with stones and rocks from the pudding which hung over the cave. Mixed into this layer were numerous animal bones, either brought there by man or by predatory animals. The pollen indicated a drier climate at that time, dominated by clusters of white oak trees. This layer was dated by magnetostratigraphy; the studies showed that the layer corresponded with the Jaramillo normal event period of direct geomagnetic polarity, between the periods of inverse geomagnetic polarity of Motonori Matuyama. This allowed the archaeologists to date the layer to between 1.050 and 1 million years.
4. About one million years ago the entry to the cave was emptied by erosion, leaving only the sediments in the deepest part of the interior chamber. The fourth layer, A thick stalagmitic floor, formed over these sediments, and was dated by Electron paramagnetic resonance to between 900,000 and 890,000 years. Pollen showed that the climate of this time was cooler and much wetter than the present climate.
5. The fifth and highest layer of sediment is composed of different sands from earlier layers of the cave, deposited during the successive wet periods which followed.

=== Animal species ===
Layer III contained the most important finds in the cave; a collection of animal bones, and 11 simple tools used by human visitors. It appears that the cave was used as a dining room by large carnivores, notably the bear, the panther, the saber-tooth tiger, and the large hyena. These brought to the cave the carcasses of herbivores; deer, bison, small bovids, rhinoceros, horses, and boars. When the predators were not in the cave, it was used by humans, who left the tools.

The bones of 25 different species of mammals were found in the cave, all characteristic of the lower Pleistocene age. Besides those named above, bones were found of the Eurasian jaguar (Panthera gombaszoegensis), the leopard, (Acinonyx pardinensis) the meridional elephant (Mammuthus meridionalis), and others. Other species were found from the middle Pleistocene period, including an early species of wolf (Canis mosbachensis), an early fox (Alopex praeglacialis), and a cave lynx (Lynx spelaea).

=== Tools ===
About 100 basic tools made by man were found in the cave. Most were made of calcaire (limestone), less often of sandstone, with a small number of tools made of quartz and flint. Percussion, or pounding, tools, were the most frequent. These included chopping tools, of poor quality. None of the tools had been reworked to improve their quality. The middle part of a femur bone of a bison was found which showed signs of being crafted into a pounding tool.

While most of the bones in the cave showed that they had been broken by the teeth of predators, a number of bones had marks that showed that they had been broken by these early tools. It appears that the early human visitors to Vallonnet cave used their stone tools to break bones and eat the marrow inside.

There were no indications of fire in the cave; fire had apparently not yet been domesticated. It appears that the people who visited the cave were not primarily hunters, but scavengers, who lived on the meat of animals killed by predators. There were also no signs that they lived in the cave.

== Comparison with other archaeological sites ==
- Gona, Afar, Ethiopia. Oldest known man-made stone tools, 2.55 million years BC.
- Dmanisi, Georgia. Remains of Homo georgicus, oldest fossils of man in Europe, 1.8 million years BC.
- Basin of Gaudix-Baza, Barranco Leon, Fuenta Nueva Three, Sima del Elefante, Atapuerca, Spain. 1.1 million–1.2 million years BC.
- Grotte du Vallonnet. 1 million–1.05 million years BC.
- Gran Dolina, Atapuerca, Spain. 780,000 years BC.
- Terra Amata, Nice, France. 480,000 BC.
- Lascaux Caves, Dordogne, France. 17,300 BC.

== Bibliography ==
Henry de Lumley, La Grande Histoire des premiers hommes européens, Odile Jacob, Paris, 2010. (ISBN 978-2-7381-2386-2)
