= Brunhes =

Brunhes may refer to:

- Bernard Brunhes (1867–1910), French geophysicist
  - Brunhes–Matuyama reversal, the reversal of the Earth's magnetic field approximately 781,000 years ago named after Brunhes and Motonori Matuyama
- Jean Brunhes (1869–1930), French geographer

== See also ==
- Brunhes-Chavany syndrome or Fahr's syndrome, a rare genetic neurological disorder
- Mid-Brunhes Event, a climatic shift approximately 430,000 years ago
