= Fumarole Butte =

Shield volcano in Juab County, Utah, United States

Coordinates: 39.61°N 112.79°W

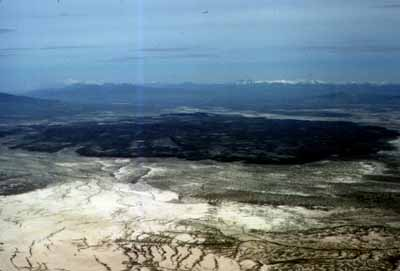
Oblique aerial view of Fumarole Butte, with Oquirrh Mountains in the background, 1978

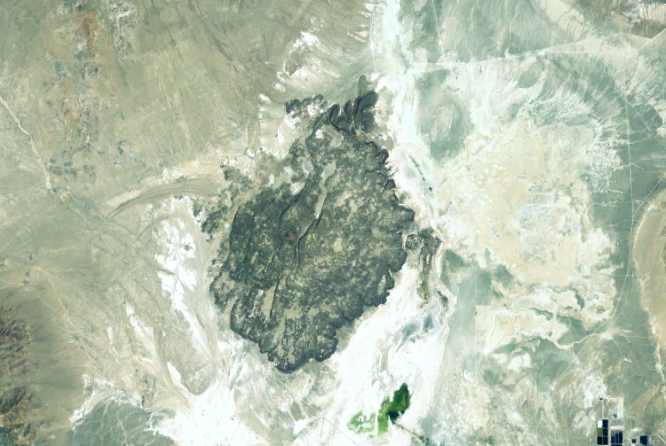
Satellite photograph of Fumarole Butte, November 2010

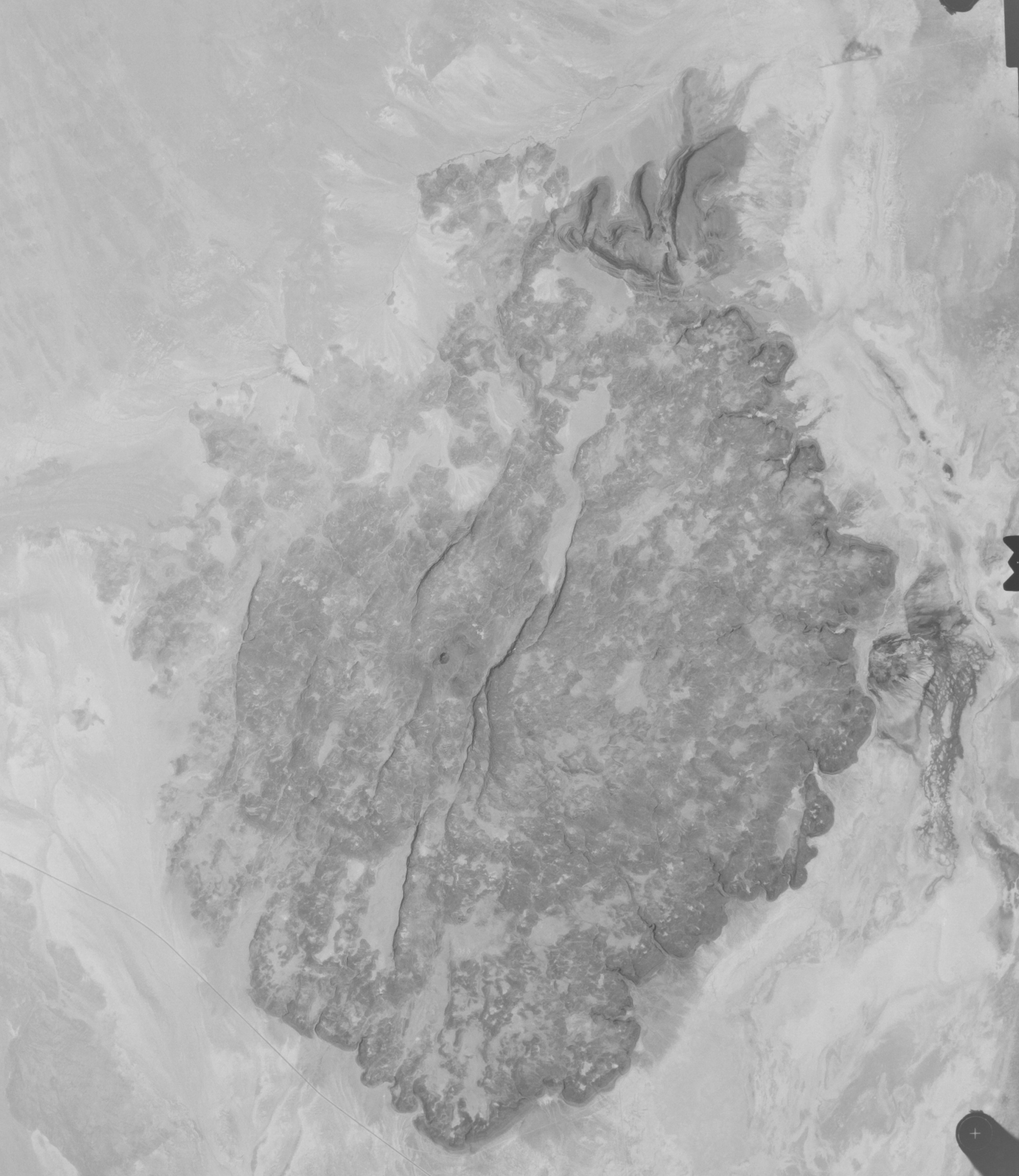
Air photo from 1978

Fumarole Butte is a shield volcano in central Juab County, Utah, United States. Built during the Quaternary period, it is composed of basaltic andesite. It stands 207 meters (679 ft) in height and has a diameter of 12 kilometers (7 mi). Under the volcano lies Crater Bench, the result of an eruption of basaltic andesite. To the east of the volcano are a series of hot springs, known as Baker Hot Springs.

== Background ==
Fumarole Butte is located in the area once dominated by Lake Bonneville, a massive body of water nearly 19,750 square miles (51,152 km^{2}) in area. The lake was created more than 800,000 years ago by extensive precipitation and glacier melting, and has dried up and re-emerged at least 28 times since. The cycles have been matched almost exactly to periods of glaciation by drilling and stratigraphic studies.

== Description ==
Fumarole Butte lies north of the Sevier Desert. It is located in the scoria-rich valley of a basaltic lava field, on top of Tertiary-aged structures of rhyolitic lava. Made of red and gray material, its composition ranges from dark basalt to reddish scoria.

Fumarole Butte formed during the Jaramillo normal event, approximately one million years ago. It is a shield volcano with a volcanic neck protruding from the center. On the edges of the volcano, lacustrine deposits can be found where the volcano was once covered by Lake Bonneville.

== Crater Bench Formation ==
Eruptions from Fumarole Butte created the basaltic Crater Bench Formation, which lies beneath the neck. It is around 900,000 years of age, dated to the Pleistocene. The area is divided by faults and ranges in thickness from 6 meters (20 ft) to 180 meters (591 ft). The primary component of the lava is aphyric basaltic andesite in which tiny crystalline structures are visible.
