= Polar drift =

Geological phenomenon resulting in shifts in the magnetic poles

The North Magnetic Pole's drift

Polar drift is a geological phenomenon caused by variations in the flow of molten iron in Earth's outer core, resulting in changes in the orientation of Earth's magnetic field, and hence the position of the magnetic north- and south poles.

The North magnetic pole is approximately 965 kilometres (600 mi) from the geographic North Pole. The pole drifts considerably each day, which results in a change of 5-60 km per year. The speed of the change was around 10 km/year for the majority of the 20th century, then increased in the 1990s to over 50 km/year, but slowed down slightly after 2020.

The South magnetic pole is constantly shifting due to changes in the Earth's magnetic field. As of 2005 it was calculated to lie at 64°31′48″S 137°51′36″E, placing it off the coast of Antarctica, between Adélie Land and Wilkes Land.

In 2015, it lay at 64.28°S 136.59°E (est). That point lies outside the Antarctic Circle and it is moving northwest by about 10 to 15 km (6 to 9 mi) per year. Its current distance from the actual Geographic South Pole is approximately 2,860 kilometres (1,780 mi). The nearest permanent science station is Dumont d'Urville Station. Wilkes Land contains a large gravitational mass concentration.

North magnetic pole
1900: 70.5°N 96.2°W
1905: 70.7°N 96.5°W
1910: 70.8°N 96.7°W
1915: 71.0°N 97.0°W
1920: 71.3°N 97.4°W
1925: 71.8°N 98.0°W
1930: 72.3°N 98.7°W
1935: 72.8°N 99.3°W
1940: 73.3°N 99.9°W
1945: 73.9°N 100.2°W
1950: 74.6°N 100.9°W
1955: 75.2°N 101.4°W
1960: 75.3°N 101.0°W
1965: 75.6°N 101.3°W
1970: 75.9°N 101.0°W
1975: 76.2°N 100.6°W
1980: 76.9°N 101.7°W
1985: 77.4°N 102.6°W
1990: 78.1°N 103.7°W
1995: 79.0°N 105.3°W
2000: 81.0°N 109.6°W
2005: 83.2°N 118.2°W
2010: 85.0°N 132.8°W
2011: 85.4°N 137.4°W
2012: 85.7°N 142.5°W
2013: 85.9°N 148.0°W
2014: 86.1°N 153.9°W
2015: 86.3°N 160.0°W
2016: 86.4°N 166.3°W
2017: 86.5°N 172.6°W
2018: 86.5°N 178.8°W
2019: 86.4°N 175.3°E
2020: 86.4°N 169.8°E
2021: 86.4°N 156.8°E
2022: 86.4°N 151.4°E
2023: 86.1°N 146.6°E
2024: 85.9°N 142.3°E
2025: 85.7°N 138.6°E

South magnetic pole
1998: 64.6°S 138.5°E
2004: 63.5°S 138.0°E (estimated)
2007: 64.497°S 137.684°E
2015: 64.28°S 136.59°E

== See also ==
- Geomagnetic excursion
- Geomagnetic reversal
- Polar wander
