= Geomagnetic excursion =

Change in the Earth's magnetic field

A geomagnetic excursion, like a geomagnetic reversal, is a significant change in the Earth's magnetic field. Unlike reversals, an excursion is not a long-term re-orientation of the large-scale field, but rather represents a dramatic, typically a (geologically) short-lived change in field intensity, with a variation in pole orientation of up to 45° from the previous position.

Excursion events typically only last a few thousand to a few tens of thousands of years, and often involve declines in field strength to between 0 and 20% of normal. Unlike full reversals, excursions are generally not recorded around the entire globe. This is certainly due in part to them not registering well in the sedimentary record, but it also seems likely that excursions may not typically extend through the entire global geomagnetic field. There are significant exceptions, however. (Note: One of the first excursions studied was the Laschamp event, dated at around 40000 years ago. Although it is thought that many excursions only affect the field over a part of the globe, the Laschamp event did in fact involve a few hundred years when the magnetic poles were completely reversed; later discoveries showed that the reversed field was only 5% of its "normal" strength. Since the Laschamp event has also been seen in sites around the Earth, it is suggested as one of the few examples of a truly global excursion.)

== Occurrence ==
Except for recent periods of the geologic past, it is not well known how frequently geomagnetic excursions occur. Unlike geomagnetic reversals, which are easily detected by the change in field direction, the relatively short-lived excursions can be easily overlooked in long-duration, coarse-resolution records of the past geomagnetic field. Present knowledge suggests that they are around ten times more abundant than reversals, with up to twelve excursions documented since the last reversal, Brunhes–Matuyama: these excursions during the Brunhes geomagnetic chron are relatively well described (the most famous is the Laschamp event).

Geomagnetic excursions in the Matuyama, Gauss and Gilbert chrons are also reported, and new possible excursions are suggested for these chrons based on analysis of the deep drilling cores from Lake Baikal and their comparison with the oceanic core (ODP) and Chinese loess records.

== Possible causes ==
Scientific opinion is divided on what causes geomagnetic excursions. The dominant hypothesis is that they are an inherent instability of the dynamo processes that generate the magnetic field. Others suggest that excursions occur when the magnetic field is reversed only within the liquid outer core, and complete reversals would occur when the outer and inner core are both affected.

=== Disorganized dynamo hypothesis ===
The most popular hypothesis is that they are an inherent aspect of the dynamo processes that maintain the Earth's magnetic field. In computer simulations, it is observed that magnetic field lines can sometimes become tangled and disorganized through the chaotic motions of liquid metal in the Earth's core. In such cases, this spontaneous disorganization can cause decreases in the magnetic field as perceived at the Earth's surface. (Note: Under the "disorganized dynamo" scenario, the Earth's internal magnetic field intensity does not significantly change within the core itself, but rather, its energy is transferred from the ordinary dipole configuration to higher order multipole configurations. The field external to a multipole decays more rapidly with the distance from the source – in this case the Earth's core. The magnetic field then expressed at the surface of the Earth would be considerably less intense, even without significant changes in its field strength deep in the core.)

This scenario is supported by observed tangling and spontaneous disorganization in the solar magnetic field (the 22 or 11 year solar cycle). However, the equivalent process in the sun invariably leads to a reversal of the solar magnetic field: It has never been observed to recover without a full-scale change in its orientation.

=== Outer-core inner-core opposition hypothesis ===
The work of David Gubbins suggests that excursions occur when the magnetic field is reversed only within the liquid outer core; reversals occur when the inner core is also affected. This fits well with observations of events within the current chron of reversals taking 3,000–7,000 years to complete, while excursions typically last 500–3,000 years. However, this timescale does not hold true for all events, and the need for separate generation of fields has been contested, since the changes can be spontaneously generated in mathematical models.

=== External driver hypothesis ===
==== Plate tectonic-driven ====
A minority opinion, held by such figures as Richard A. Muller, is that geomagnetic excursions are not spontaneous processes but rather triggered by external events which directly disrupt the flow in the Earth's core. Such processes may include the arrival of continental slabs carried down into the mantle by the action of plate tectonics at subduction zones, the initiation of new mantle plumes from the core–mantle boundary, and possibly mantle-core shear forces and displacements resulting from very large impact events. Supporters of this theory hold that any of these events lead to a large scale disruption of the dynamo, effectively turning off the geomagnetic field for a period of time necessary for it to recover.

==== Substantial cosmic impact ====
Richard A. Muller and Donald E. Morris suggest some geomagnetic reversals may be caused by very large impact events and following rapid climate change. In this theory, the impact triggers a little ice age, and water redistribution toward the poles alters the rotation rate of crust and mantle. If the sea-level change is sufficiently large (>10 meters) and rapid (within a few hundred years), the velocity shear in the liquid core disrupts the convective cells that drive the Earth's dynamo.

== Effects ==
Due to the weakening of the magnetic field, particularly during the transition period, more radiation would reach the Earth's surface, increasing production of beryllium 10 and levels of carbon 14.

Homo erectus and possibly Homo heidelbergensis lived through the Brunhes–Matuyama reversal. A major hazard to modern society is likely to be similar to that of geomagnetic storms, where satellites and power supplies may be damaged, and compass navigation would also be affected. Some forms of life that are thought to navigate based on magnetic fields may be disrupted, but these species have also survived past excursions. Since excursion periods are not always global, any effect might be experienced only in certain places, with others relatively unaffected. The time involved could be as little as a century, or as much as 10,000 years.

=== Relationship to climate ===
There is evidence that geomagnetic excursions are associated with episodes of rapid short-term climatic cooling during periods of continental glaciation (ice ages).

Recent analysis of the geomagnetic reversal frequency, oxygen isotope record, and tectonic plate subduction rate, which are indicators of the changes in the heat flux at the core mantle boundary, climate and plate tectonic activity, shows that all these changes indicate similar rhythms on million years' timescale in the Cenozoic Era occurring with the common fundamental periodicity of ~13 Myr during most of the time.

== See also ==
- March 1989 geomagnetic storm
- Polar drift
- Solar storm of 1859
