= Matsuyama Rocks =

Antarctic rock formation

The Matsuyama Rocks (66°40′S 66°35′W) are a small group of rocks close off the west side of Stefan Ice Piedmont, Graham Land, Antarctica. They are located towards the western end of Crystal Sound. They were mapped from air photos taken by the Falkland Islands and Dependencies Aerial Survey Expedition (1956–57), and were named by the UK Antarctic Place-Names Committee after Motonori Matsuyama, Professor of Geology and Geophysics at Kyoto University, Japan, who made laboratory studies of the crystal forms of ice.
