= Motonori Matuyama =

Japanese geophysicist (1884–1958)

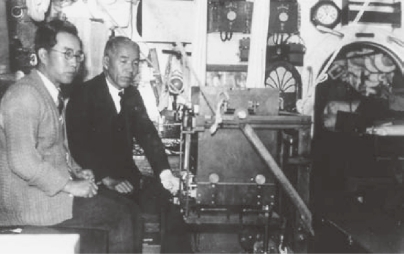
- Professor Motonori Matuyama (right) and technical assistant Naoiti Kumagai (left) with Meinesz’s pendulum aboard submarine Ro 57 in 1934
- Born: October 25, 1884; Uyeda, Japan
- Died: January 27, 1958 (aged 73); Yamaguchi, Japan
- Education: Kyoto Imperial University
- Known for: First evidence and time-scale for geomagnetic reversals; Matuyama reversed chron
- Scientific career
- Fields: Geophysics
- Workplaces: Kyoto Imperial University
- Doctoral advisor: Toshi Shida

Motonori Matsuyama (松山 基範, Matsuyama Motonori; October 25, 1884 – January 27, 1958) was a Japanese geophysicist who was (in the late 1920s) the first to provide systematic evidence that the Earth's magnetic field had been reversed in the early Pleistocene and to suggest that long periods existed in the past in which the polarity was reversed. He remarked that the Earth's field had later changed to the present polarity. The era of reversed polarity preceding the current Brunhes Chron of normal polarity is now called the Matuyama Reversed Chron; and the transition between them is called the Brunhes–Matuyama or Matuyama-Brunhes reversal.

== Life ==
Matuyama Motonori was born at Uyeda (now Usa) in Oita prefecture Japan on October 25, 1884, a son of a Zen abbot, Sumie (Sumiye) Tengai. His name was at first registered as Suehara Motonori after his mother’s family name, Suehara Kou, and was later changed to Sumie Motonori when his father became the chief priest at an eminent Zen Buddhist temple in Yamaguchi. In 1910 he was adopted by the Matsuyama (松山) family, when he married their daughter, Matsuyama Matsuye, and was known as Matsuyama Motonori. About 1926, in conformity with a then new convention of transliteration, he altered the romanization of his adoptive family name to Matuyama.

Matuyama was educated at the University of Hiroshima and Kyoto Imperial University, where he was appointed to a lectureship in 1913. After spending the period 1919–21 at the University of Chicago working with Thomas C. Chamberlin studying ice, he returned to Japan and was made professor of theoretical geology at Kyoto Imperial University in 1922. He conducted a gravity survey of Japan during the period 1927–32, extending this to also cover Korea and Manchuria, and studied marine gravity using the Vening–Meinesz pendulum apparatus in a submarine.

While rocks had earlier been found with polarities opposite to the present field and the hypothesis advanced that the field had reversed in the past, Matuyama was the first to conduct a disciplined study of the hypothesis. In 1926 he began collecting basalt specimens in Manchuria and Japan, and in 1929 published a paper showing that there was a clear correlation between the polarity and the stratigraphic position. He remarked that the Earth's field had been reversed in the early Pleistocene age and older, and that it had later changed to the present polarity.

This reversed polarity, particularly as shown by the rocks of the ocean floor, provided crucial evidence for the sea floor spreading hypothesis of Harry H. Hess.

Matuyama served the Kyoto Imperial University as dean of the Faculty of Science from June 1936 until December 1937; he retired from teaching in 1944 and was made professor emeritus in 1946. In May 1949, Matuyama was appointed the founding president of Yamaguchi University (N.B. the University transliterated his family name as Matsuyama). In 1950 he was elected a fellow of the Japan Academy.

== Legacy ==
"The Japanese geophysicist Motonori Matsuyama (1884–1958, as spelled and pronounced but mistransliterated in his own publications and others as Matuyama) was the first to document clearly from basalts in the Genbudō (basalt caves), Japan, the reversed magnetic polarity interval from 2.58 to 0.773 Ma that we now call the Matuyama Reversed Polarity Chron." --Martin J. Head

The transition, about 0.78 Ma, to normal polarity (i.e., that of the present Earth's field) is the Brunhes-Matuyama or Matuyama-Brunhes reversal. At the 1973 Burg Wartenstein Symposium, it was recommended that “The beginning of the Middle Pleistocene should be so defined as to either coincide with or be closely linked to the boundary between the Matuyama Reversed Epoch and the Brunhes Normal Epoch of paleomagnetic chronology”. This was finalized in 2020, when the Executive Committee of the International Union of Geological Sciences officially ratified the Global Boundary Stratotype Section and Point (GSSP) defining the base of the Chibanian Stage and Middle Pleistocene Subseries at the Chiba section, Japan, using the Matuyama-Brunhes reversal as a marker.

The boundary, about 2.58 Ma, between the Gauss Normal Chron and the Matuyama Reversed Chron is known as the Gauss-Matuyama reversal.

Matsuyama Rocks, in Crystal Sound, Antarctica, are named in his honour and his work on ice crystals.
