= Baker Hot Springs =

Geothermal springs

- Crater Springs; Abraham Hot Springs
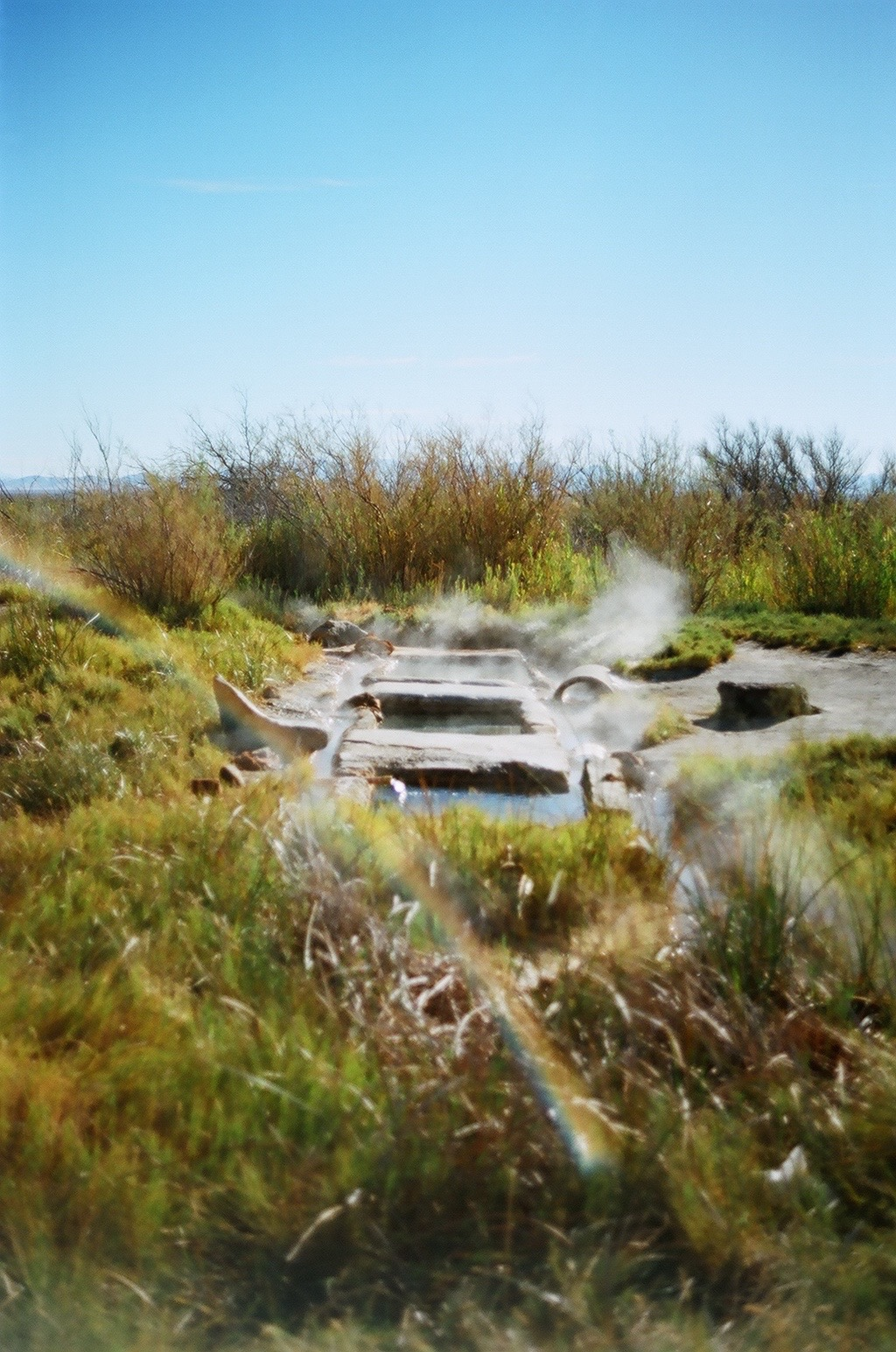

- Location within Utah
- Interactive map of Baker Hot Springs
- Coordinates: 39.61°N 112.73°W
- Elevation: 1460
- Type: volcanic
- Discharge: 17 gallons per second
- Temperature: 180 °F (82 °C)

Baker Hot Springs are a system of geothermal springs located on Fumarole Butte, northwest of the town of Delta, Utah. The springs were formerly known as Crater Springs and Abraham Hot Springs.

== Water profile ==
The hot mineral water emerges from the spring at 180 °F/82 °C. The primary mineral content is manganese, and water has a high sulphur content giving it the characteristic "rotten egg" smell.

A 1976 inventory mapped 40 spring openings with an estimated flow of 90 liters per second. In 2011, the spring water discharged at 17 gallons per second, and flows into three concrete soaking pools, approximately 5' x 8'; these concrete structures are all that is left of an old resort. Next to the soaking pools is a channel with cold spring water that can be diverted into the soaking pools to cool the water. Nearby are hot water seeps that can be dug out to create primitive soaking pools.

== Geology ==
The hot springs and seeps are located in the Sevier Desert on Fumarole Butte which is a basaltic andesite type of shield volcano from the Quaternary period, overlaying basalt and rhyolite. The hot water emerges from a travertine and alluvial mound (sometimes described as a tufa mound) that flank the eastern side of the basalt lava formation. The area is fenced, but accessible, and used primarily by locals. There are a series of concrete soaking tubs constructed west of the spring heads.

== See also ==
- List of hot springs in the United States
- List of hot springs in the world
