= Neil D. Opdyke =

American geologist (1933–2019)

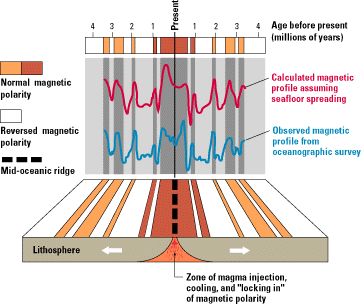
Illustration of magnetic reversal

Neil D. Opdyke (February 7, 1933 – April 7, 2019) was an American geologist.

He was the Distinguished Professor Emeritus in the Department of Geological Sciences at the University of Florida in Gainesville, Florida, United States. He was previously with Lamont-Doherty Geological Observatory of Columbia University, including a stint as Director. He was well known for his groundbreaking research in the 1950s on paleoclimate and continental drift, with Keith Runcorn, and later in Africa and Australia with Mike McElhinny and others. Back the U.S. in the mid-1960s he worked on the documentation of magnetic reversals in deep-sea sediments, which led to proof of the Vine–Matthews–Morley hypothesis the governing paradigm for marine magnetic anomalies.

In 1969, Dr. Opdyke & Ken Henry used marine core data for a convincing test of the GAD hypothesis that is central to the use of paleomagnetism in continental reconstruction. Opdyke’s work with Nick Shackleton in 1973 marked the beginning of the integration of oxygen isotope stratigraphy and magnetostratigraphy that has led to current methods of tuning timescales. Neil pioneered magnetic stratigraphy in terrestrial (non-marine) sediments and produced some of the most impressive records, notably from Pakistan and southwestern United States. These studies led to a vastly improved time frame for vertebrate evolution and allowed the documentation of mammal migration.

== Research interests ==
- Paleomagnetism and its application to tectonics and magnetostratigraphy.
- Paleoclimatology and paleogeography of the Phanerozoic.

== Education ==
- B.A., Columbia University, 1955
- D.Sc., University of Newcastle upon Tyne, 1982
- Ph.D., Durham University, England, 1958

== Memberships and distinctions ==
- European Geosciences Union Petrus Peregrinus Medal 2008 for pioneering work in magnetic stratigraphy of marine and continental sediments and its contribution to our understanding of the history of the magnetic field and its geological applications.
- National Academy of Sciences, 1996
- American Academy of Arts and Sciences, 1998
- Geological Society of America, fellow
- American Association for the Advancement of Science, Fellow
- American Geophysical Union, Fellow
- American Geophysical Union John Adam Fleming Medal 1996
