= Dilophodelphis =

Dilophodelphis Temporal range: Early Miocene
- 3D model of a Dilophodelphis fordycei skull

Scientific classification
- Domain: Eukaryota
- Kingdom: Animalia
- Phylum: Chordata
- Class: Mammalia
- Order: Artiodactyla
- Infraorder: Cetacea
- Genus: †Dilophodelphis; Boersma, McMurry, and Pyenson, 2017
- Species: †D. fordycei

Binomial name
- †Dilophodelphis fordycei Boersma, McMurry, and Pyenson, 2017

Extinct genus of dolphins

Dilophodelphis is an extinct genus of river dolphin from Early Miocene (Burdigalian) marine deposits in Oregon. The type species, Dilophodelphis fordycei, was named in 2017.

== Biology and description ==
Dilophodelphis is distinguished from other extinct relatives of the South Asian river dolphin in having enlarged supraorbital crests resembling a twin mountain arrangement, quite similar to the crests of the theropod dinosaur Dilophosaurus.
