= Raksasamys =

Raksasamys Temporal range: Holocene

Scientific classification
- Kingdom: Animalia
- Phylum: Chordata
- Class: Mammalia
- Infraclass: Placentalia
- Order: Rodentia
- Family: Muridae
- Subfamily: Murinae
- Tribe: Rattini
- Genus: †Raksasamys; Turvey et al., 2017
- Species: †R. tikusbesar

Binomial name
- †Raksasamys tikusbesar Turvey et al., 2017

Genus of fossil rodents

Raksasamys is a genus of large subfossil murids that lived on Sumba in Indonesia around 3500 years ago. The only known species is R. tikusbesar. Remains have been found on Mahaniwa (East Sumba) in Liang Liwaula, consisting of maxillary parts, scapula, and femur. Judging from the size of the jaw bone, Raksasamys was a very large rodent that could reach 468.2–680.5 g. Besides its large size, Raksasamys also differs from most eastern Lesser Sunda rodent in having very high-crowned and strongly fluted molars with simplified crown morphology and thin flattened upper molar laminate. Raksasamys coexisted with another extinct rodent, Milimonggamys, which had a smaller size.
