= Milimonggamys =

Milimonggamys Temporal range: Holocene

Scientific classification
- Kingdom: Animalia
- Phylum: Chordata
- Class: Mammalia
- Infraclass: Placentalia
- Order: Rodentia
- Family: Muridae
- Subfamily: Murinae
- Tribe: Rattini
- Genus: †Milimonggamys; Turvey et al., 2017
- Species: †M. juliae

Binomial name
- †Milimonggamys juliae Turvey et al., 2017

Extinct genus of rodents

Milimonggamys is a genus of large murids that lived on Sumba in Indonesia during Holocene epoch until around 1889 year ago.

== Description ==
Its fossil have been found on Mahaniwa (East Sumba) inside Liang Liwaula that consist most of the mandibulary parts of the animal. Its mandible has reduced coronoid and angular processes that do not extend dorsally or posteriorly beyond the level of the articular condyle; this mandible morphology is only similar to Komodomys among the endemic Flores murid genera, but is otherwise similar to some southeast Asian Rattini (e.g. Maxomys). Although not as big as some extinct and extant Lesser Sunda rodents, Milimonggamys is still a large rodent that can reach 251.2–336.3 g. They lived alongside other giant rat species that have been named Raksasamys ("giant rat").
