= Turkanatragus =

Turkanatragus Temporal range: Miocene

Scientific classification
- Domain: Eukaryota
- Kingdom: Animalia
- Phylum: Chordata
- Class: Mammalia
- Order: Artiodactyla
- Family: Bovidae
- Subfamily: Antilopinae
- Genus: †Turkanatragus; Geraads, 2017
- Species: †T. marymuunguae

Binomial name
- †Turkanatragus marymuunguae Geraads, 2017

Extinct species of mammal

Turkanatragus is an extinct genus of bovid that inhabited Kenya during the Miocene epoch.
