= Gauss–Matuyama reversal =

Earth's geomagnetic reversal 2.58 million years ago

The Gauss–Matuyama Reversal was a geologic event approximately 2.58 Ma when the Earth's magnetic field underwent a geomagnetic reversal from normal polarity (Gauss Chron) to reverse polarity (Matuyama Chron). The reversal is named after German physicist Johann Carl Friedrich Gauss and Japanese geophysicist Motonori Matuyama.

The Gauss–Matuyama reversal is a natural phenomenon that is frequently used as a boundary between the Pliocene and Pleistocene epochs, marking the start of the Quaternary period, and is often used to date sediments. The reversal is thought to have contributed to a hostile environment on Earth due to the lack of protective features of magnetic fields to shield life from ionizing radiation generated by the early Pleistocene supernova.

== Biological effects ==
The Gauss–Matuyama reversal is marked by a minor mass extinction of calcareous nannofossils Discoaster pentaradiatus and Discoaster surculus, among others. The Earth's magnetic field is approximately four times stronger today than it was during the Gauss–Matuyama reversal. The reversal is thought to have weakened the shielding that the magnetic field provides the surface Earth, resulting in more exposure to ionizing radiation generated by the early Pleistocene supernova, and leaving the Earth unshielded for ~15 ky.

The propagation of charged particles is dependent in the magnetic field intensity and changes in the dipole moment found in the magnetic field. The ionospheric ionization at the poles and equator reduces the energy on cosmic rays by several orders of magnitude. During the reversal, the dipole field was reduced or entirely canceled because the virtual poles were located at low and intermediate latitudes, which would expose these regions to cosmic rays.

== Methods for dating reversal ==
Luminescence dating of lacustrine sediment are used to date the Gauss–Matuyama reversal. This method is a form of geochronology that measures the amount of photons released from a material after being stimulated. This method primarily observes the movement of U, Th, Rb and K as ionizing radiation. The product of stimulating these elements is a reliable date on the sediment.

== See also ==
- Brunhes–Matuyama reversal
- Eltanin impact of 2.51 ± 0.07 million years ago
- Jaramillo reversal
- Electromagnetic field
- Field (physics)
- Electric charge
