= Yoel Rak =

German-Israeli paleontologist

- יואל רק
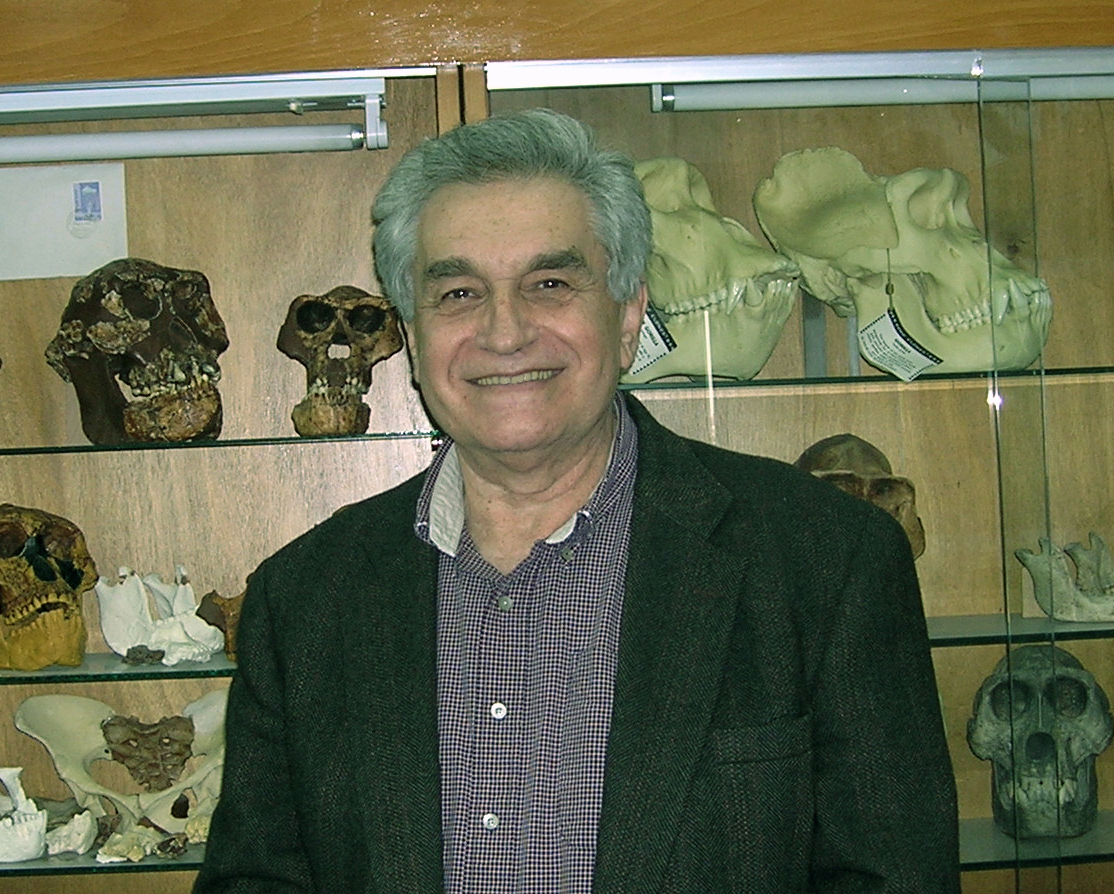
- Known for: Member of Israel Academy of Sciences and Humanities
- Awards: Igor Orenstein Chair
- Scientific career
- Fields: Paleoanthropology; Anatomy; Anthropology

Yoel Rak (Hebrew: יואל רק; born 29 June 1946) is an Israeli anatomist, paleoanthropologist and researcher. He is a professor emeritus in the Department of Anatomy and Physical Anthropology at Tel Aviv University's School of Medicine.

== Career ==
In 1972, Rak received a bachelor's degree in prehistoric archaeology from the Hebrew University. After earning his master's degree in 1975, he moved to the University of California, Berkeley. There, under the guidance of Sherwood L. Washburn, Tim D. White, and Francis Clark Howell, Rak completed his doctoral dissertation, The Morphology and Architecture of the Australopithecine Face, in 1981. Two years later, an edited version of his dissertation was published in New York by Academic Press as The Australopithecine Face. In 1981, Rak returned to Israel and was appointed as a lecturer at Tel Aviv University, where he became a full professor in 1991. From 2004 to 2008, he headed the Department of Anatomy and Physical Anthropology.

== Research areas ==
Yoel Rak studies human anatomy and evolution. He focuses on facial anatomy, jaw function, and the mechanics of walking upright.

Yoel Rak’s second area of research focuses on Neanderthal remains found in Israel. For a long period of time, this region was inhabited by Neanderthals migrating from the north while Homo sapiens was coming from the south. Both groups took turns living in the same caves.

Rak led several excavations and took part in projects such as the exploration of Amud Cave(1990–1994) and Kebara Cave (1982–1990), where the southernmost evidence of a Neanderthal presence was identified. Since 1990, Rak has participated as the expedition’s anatomist for the Hadar project in Ethiopia. In 1992 he discovered the first complete skull of A. afarensis (AL444.2).

== Honors ==
In 2008, Rak was elected as a member of the Israel Academy of Sciences and Humanities. In 1999, he was awarded the Igor Orenstein Chair for the Study of Aging at Tel Aviv University.

== Selected publications ==
=== Books ===
- The Australopithecine Face. Academic Press, New York 1983, ISBN 978-0125762809.
- William H. Kimbel, Yoel Rak, Donald Johanson, Ralph L Holloway and Michael S Yuan: The Skull of Australopithecus afarensis. Oxford University Press , London 2004, ISBN 978-0195157062.

=== Articles ===
- Rak, Yoel (1978). "The functional significance of the squamosal suture in Australopithecus boisei". American Journal of Physical Anthropology. 49 (1): 71–78. doi:10.1002/ajpa.1330490111. ISSN 0002-9483. PMID 98055.
- Rak, Yoel; Howell, F. Clark (1978). "Cranium of a juvenile Australopithecus boisei from the lower Omo Basin, Ethiopia". American Journal of Physical Anthropology. 48 (3): 345–365. doi:10.1002/ajpa.1330480311. ISSN 1096-8644.
- Rak, Yoel; Clarke, Ronald J. (1979). "Ear ossicle of Australopithecus robustus". Nature. 279 (5708): 62–63. Bibcode:1979Natur.279...62R. doi:10.1038/279062a0. ISSN 1476-4687. PMID 377094.
- Rak, Y.; Clarke, R. J. (1979). "Aspects of the middle and external ear of early South African hominids". American Journal of Physical Anthropology. 51 (3): 471–474. doi:10.1002/ajpa.1330510320. ISSN 0002-9483. PMID 119440.
- Rak, Y (1985). Australopithecine taxonomy and phylogeny in light of facial morphology, American Journal of Physical Anthropology. doi:10.1002/ajpa.1330660305
- Rak, Yoel (1986-03-01). "The Neanderthal: A new look at an old face". Journal of Human Evolution. 15 (3): 151–164. Bibcode:1986JHumE..15..151R. doi:10.1016/S0047-2484(86)80042-2. ISSN 0047-2484.
- "On the differences between two pelvises of Mousterian context from the Qafzeh and Kebara caves, Israel". scispace.com.
- Kimbel, William H.; Johanson, Donald C.; Rak, Yoel (1994). "The first skull and other new discoveries of Australopithecus afarensis at Hadar, Ethiopia". Nature. 368 (6470): 449–451. Bibcode:1994Natur.368..449K. doi:10.1038/368449a0. ISSN 1476-4687. PMID 8133889.
- Rak, Y.; Kimbel, W. H.; Johanson, D. C. (1996). "The crescent of foramina in Australopithecus afarensis and other early hominids". American Journal of Physical Anthropology. 101 (1): 93–99. doi:10.1002/(SICI)1096-8644(199609)101:1<93::AID-AJPA6>3.0.CO;2-E. ISSN 0002-9483. PMID 8876815.
- Rak, Yoel; Ginzburg, Avishag; Geffen, Eli (2007-04-17). "Gorilla-like anatomy on Australopithecus afarensis mandibles suggests Au. afarensis link to robust australopiths". Proceedings of the National Academy of Sciences. 104 (16): 6568–6572. doi:10.1073/pnas.0606454104. PMC 1871826. PMID 17426152.
