= Montanacastor =

Montanacastor Temporal range: Rupelian

Scientific classification
- Kingdom: Animalia
- Phylum: Chordata
- Class: Mammalia
- Infraclass: Placentalia
- Order: Rodentia
- Family: Castoridae
- Genus: †Montanacastor; Korth & Tabrum, 2017
- Species: †M. simplicidens

Binomial name
- †Montanacastor simplicidens Korth & Tabrum, 2017

Extinct genus of rodents

Montanacastor is an extinct genus of castorid that lived in North America during the Rupelian stage of the Oligocene epoch.

== Distribution ==
The only species in the genus, Montanacastor simplicidens, is known from southwestern Montana.
