= Araeodelphis =

Araeodelphis natator Temporal range: early Miocene

Scientific classification
- Domain: Eukaryota
- Kingdom: Animalia
- Phylum: Chordata
- Class: Mammalia
- Order: Artiodactyla
- Infraorder: Cetacea
- Family: Platanistidae
- Genus: †Araeodelphis; Kellogg, 1957
- Species: †A. natator

Binomial name
- †Araeodelphis natator Kellogg, 1957

Extinct genus of dolphins

Araeodelphis is an extinct genus of river dolphin from the early Miocene of the East Coast of the United States.

== Fossils ==
Remains of Araeodelphis are known from the early Miocene Burdigalian-age Plum Point Member of the Calvert Formation in Maryland.

== Phylogeny ==
Cladistic analysis by Godfrey et al. (2017) recovers Araeodelphis as basal to the South Asian river dolphin the platanistid subfamily Pomatodelphinae.
