= Afrotragus =

Afrotragus Temporal range: Miocene

Scientific classification
- Domain: Eukaryota
- Kingdom: Animalia
- Phylum: Chordata
- Class: Mammalia
- Order: Artiodactyla
- Family: Bovidae
- Subfamily: Antilopinae
- Genus: †Afrotragus; Geraads, 2017
- Species: †A. premelampus

Binomial name
- †Afrotragus premelampus Harris, 2003

Extinct species of mammal

Afrotragus is an extinct genus of bovid that inhabited Kenya during the Miocene epoch.
