= Pozomys =

Pozomys Temporal range: Bartonian

Scientific classification
- Kingdom: Animalia
- Phylum: Chordata
- Class: Mammalia
- Infraclass: Placentalia
- Order: Rodentia
- Genus: †Pozomys; Boivin et al., 2017
- Species: †P. ucayaliensis

Binomial name
- †Pozomys ucayaliensis Boivin et al., 2017

Extinct genus of rodents

Pozomys is an extinct genus of caviomorph that lived during the Bartonian stage of the Eocene epoch.

== Distribution ==
Pozomys ucayaliensis is known from the Pozo Formation of Peru.
