= Mioeuoticus =

Mioeuoticus Temporal range: Burdigalian–Langhian, ~19–15 Ma

Scientific classification
- Kingdom: Animalia
- Phylum: Chordata
- Class: Mammalia
- Order: Primates
- Suborder: Strepsirrhini
- Family: Lorisidae
- Subfamily: †Mioeuoticinae; Harrison, 2010
- Genus: †Mioeuoticus; Leakey, 1962

Extinct genus of primates

Mioeuoticus is an extinct genus of lorisid primates from the Miocene of East Africa. It is the only genus in the subfamily Mioeuoticinae. Mioeuoticus was a relatively small, potto-sized animal with an omnivorous diet consisting of fruit and insects.

== Species ==
- †M. bishopi Leakey, 1962 (Type)
- †M. kichotoi Kunimatsu et al., 2017
- †M. shipmani Phillips and Walker, 2000
