= Phenacophiomys =

Phenacophiomys Temporal range: Rupelian

Scientific classification
- Kingdom: Animalia
- Phylum: Chordata
- Class: Mammalia
- Infraclass: Placentalia
- Order: Rodentia
- Family: †Phiomyidae
- Genus: †Phenacophiomys; Marivaux et al., 2017
- Species: †P. occidentalis

Binomial name
- †Phenacophiomys occidentalis Marivaux et al., 2017

Extinct genus of rodents

Phenacophiomys is an extinct genus of phiomyid that lived during the Rupelian stage of the Oligocene epoch.

== Distribution ==
Phenacophiomys occidentalis is known from the Samlat Formation of Western Sahara.
