= Kalepithecus =

Kalepithecus Temporal range: Burdigalian–Langhian

Scientific classification
- Missing taxonomy template (fix): Kalepithecus

Type species
- Micropithecus songhorensis Andrews, 1978

Other species
- Kalepithecus kogolensis Pickford et al., 2017

Extinct genus of catarrhine primate

Kalepithecus is an extinct genus of catarrhine primate that lived in Africa during the Miocene epoch.

== Etymology ==
The specific epithet of the species Kalepithecus kogolensis references Kogole, a basalt hill near the fossil site of Moroto II, where the holotype of the species was found.
