= Laschamp event =

Brief reversal of the Earth's magnetic field about 41,400 years ago

The Laschamp or Laschamps event, (Note: The name derives from the Laschamps lava flows from which it was discovered, but appears as 'Laschamp' in most scientific literature.) also termed the Adams event, was a geomagnetic excursion (a short reversal of the Earth's magnetic field) that occurred between 42,200 and 41,500 years ago, during the Last Glacial Period. It was discovered from geomagnetic anomalies found in the Laschamps and Olby lava flows near Clermont-Ferrand, France in the 1960s.

The Laschamp event was the first known geomagnetic excursion and remains the most thoroughly studied among the known geomagnetic excursions.

It is named after the village of Laschamps, part of the commune of Saint-Genès-Champanelle in France.

== Background and effects ==
Since its discovery, the magnetic excursion has been demonstrated in geological archives from many parts of the world. The transition from the normal field to the reversed field lasted approximately 250 years, while the magnetic field remained reversed for approximately 440 years. During the transition, Earth's magnetic field declined to a minimum of 5% of its current strength, and was at about 25% of its current strength when fully reversed. This reduction in geomagnetic field strength resulted in more cosmic rays reaching the Earth, causing greater production of the cosmogenic isotopes beryllium-10 and carbon-14, a decrease in atmospheric ozone, and changes in atmospheric circulation.

This loss of the geomagnetic shield has been claimed to have contributed to the extinction of Australian megafauna, the extinction of the Neanderthals and the appearance of cave art. However, the lack of corroborating evidence of a causal link between the Laschamp event and population bottlenecks of many megafauna species, and the relatively moderate radio-isotopic changes during the event, have cast significant doubt on the real impact of the Laschamp event on global environmental changes.

Because it occurred approximately 42,000 years ago, the period has been termed the Adams Event or Adams Transitional Geomagnetic Event, a tribute to science fiction writer Douglas Adams, who wrote in The Hitchhiker's Guide to the Galaxy that "42" was the answer to life, the universe and everything.

== Research ==
The Australian Research Council funded research to analyze a fossilized kauri tree found in New Zealand in 2019. Radiocarbon dating revealed that the tree was alive from 42,500–41,000 years ago, within the timeframe of the event.

== See also ==
- Late Pleistocene extinctions
- Solar cycle
- Solar cycle 1
- Timeline of prehistory#Upper Paleolithic
