= Jaramillo reversal =

The Jaramillo reversal was a reversal and excursion of the Earth's magnetic field that occurred approximately one million years ago. In the geological time scale it was a "short-term" positive reversal in the then-dominant Matuyama reversed magnetic chronozone; its beginning is widely dated to 990,000 years before the present (BP), and its end to 950,000 BP (though an alternative date of 1.07 million years ago to 990,000 is also found in the scientific literature).

The causes and mechanisms of short-term reversals and excursions like the Jaramillo, as well as the major field reversals like the Brunhes–Matuyama reversal, are subjects of study and dispute among researchers. One theory associates the Jaramillo with the Bosumtwi impact event, as evidenced by a tektite strewnfield in the Ivory Coast, though this hypothesis has been claimed as "highly speculative" and "refuted". A later study found the deposition of the Ivory Coast strewn field and the onset of the Jaramillo reversal not to be contemporaneous as previously inferred. They are separated in time by 30,000 years.

== See also ==
- Gauss-Matuyama reversal
- Bosumtwi impact event
- List of geomagnetic reversals
