= Bernard Brunhes =

French geophysicist (1867–1910)

Antoine Joseph Bernard Brunhes
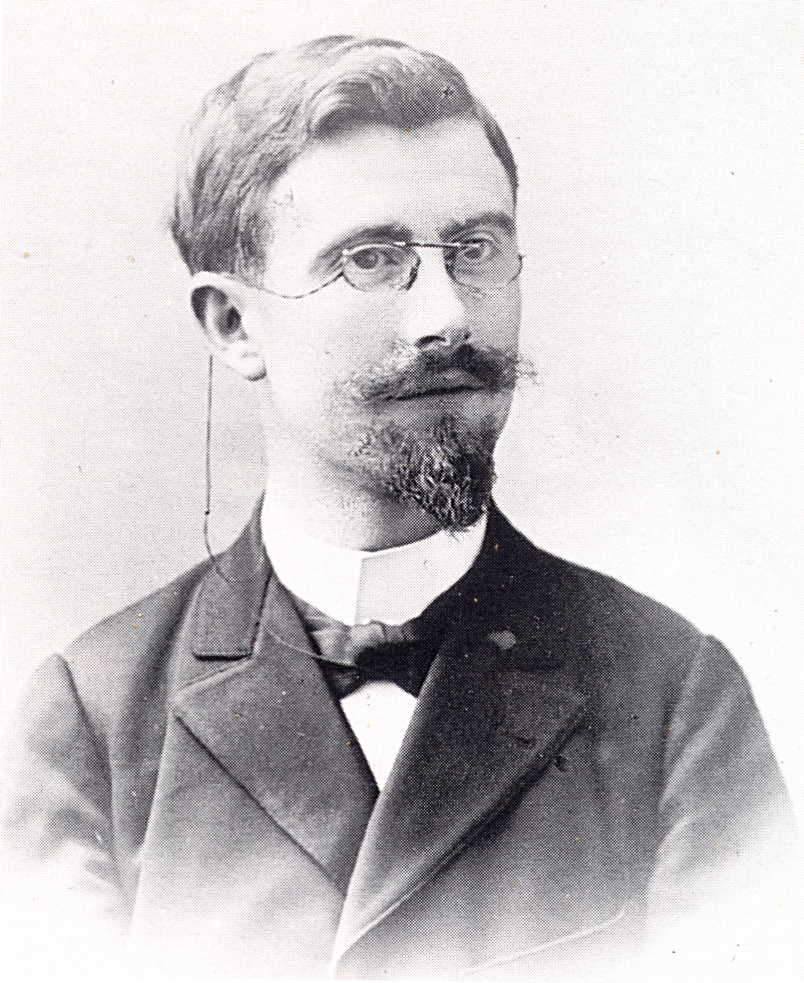
- Born: 3 July 1867; Toulouse, France
- Died: 10 May 1910 (aged 42); Clermont-Ferrand, France
- Education: École Normale Supérieure, Paris
- Known for: Discovery of geomagnetic reversal
- Scientific career
- Fields: Geophysics
- Workplaces: Université Lille Nord de France, École centrale de Lille, Puy-de-Dôme Observatory

Antoine Joseph Bernard Brunhes (3 July 1867 – 10 May 1910) was a French geophysicist known for his pioneering work in paleomagnetism, in particular, his 1906 discovery of geomagnetic reversal. The current period of normal polarity, Brunhes Chron, and the Brunhes–Matuyama reversal are named for him.

Brunhes was educated at the École Normale Supérieure in Paris, from which he graduated as an agrégé qualified in physics. Appointed at Université Lille Nord de France, he taught physics and electrical engineering at École centrale de Lille from 1893 to 1895.

In November 1900, he was appointed as head of the Puy-de-Dôme Observatory, built on an extinct volcano in the Auvergne region of France, where he worked until his death in 1910.

It was during his time at the observatory that he made the crucial observation that led to his discovery of geomagnetic reversal. In 1905, he found that rocks in an ancient lava flow at Pontfarin in the commune of Cézens (part of the Cantal département) were magnetised in a direction almost opposite to that of the present-day magnetic field. From this, he deduced that the magnetic North Pole of the time was close to the current geographical South Pole, which could only have happened if the magnetic field of the Earth had been reversed at some point in the past. He was correct, though it took another 50 years before his theory was fully accepted by the scientific community.
