= Brunhes–Matuyama reversal =

Most recent geomagnetic reversal event

The Brunhes–Matuyama reversal, named after Bernard Brunhes and Motonori Matuyama, was a geologic event, approximately 781,000 years ago, when the Earth's magnetic field last underwent reversal. Estimations vary as to the abruptness of the reversal. A 2004 paper estimated that the process of reversal took several thousand years; a 2010 paper estimated that it occurred more quickly, perhaps within a human lifetime; a 2019 paper estimated that the reversal lasted 22,000 years.

The apparent duration at any particular location can vary by an order of magnitude, depending on geomagnetic latitude and local effects of non-dipole components of the Earth's field during the transition.

The Brunhes–Matuyama reversal is a marker for the Global Boundary Stratotype Section and Point (GSSP) defining the base of the Chibanian Stage and Middle Pleistocene Subseries at the Chiba section, Japan, which was officially ratified in 2020 by the International Union of Geological Sciences. It is useful in dating ocean sediment cores and subaerially erupted volcanics.

There is a highly speculative theory that connects this reversal event to the large Australasian strewnfield (c. 790,000 years ago), although the causes of the two are almost certainly unconnected and only coincidentally happened around the same time. Adding to the data is the large African Bosumtwi impact event (c. 1.07 million years ago) and the later Jaramillo reversal (c. 1 million years ago), another coincident pair of events.

== See also ==
- Bosumtwi impact event
- Gauss–Matuyama reversal
- Geomagnetic reversal
- Jaramillo reversal
- List of geomagnetic reversals
