= 2019 in paleomammalogy =

This paleomammalogy list records new fossil mammal taxa that were described during the year 2019, as well as notes other significant paleomammalogy discoveries and events which occurred during that year.

== Afrotherians ==
=== Afrosoricida ===
Name	Novelty	Status	Authors	Age	Type locality	Country	Notes	Images
Damarachloris	Gen. et sp. nov	Valid	Pickford	Middle Eocene	Black Crow Limestone	Namibia	A chrysochlorid golden mole. The type species is D. primaevus.	
Nanogale	Gen. et sp. nov	Valid	Pickford	Middle Eocene	Black Crow Limestone	Namibia	A Tenrecomorph. The type species is N. fragilis.	

=== Proboscidea ===
Name	Novelty	Status	Authors	Age	Type locality	Country	Notes	Images
Blancotherium	Gen. et comb. nov	Valid	May	Early Clarendonian	Goliad Formation	United States (Texas)	A gomphothere. The type species is "Gnathabelodon" buckneri Sellards (1940)	
Mammut pacificus	Sp. nov	Valid	Dooley et al.	Pleistocene (Rancholabrean)		United States (California; Idaho)	A mastodon	
Saloumia	Gen. et sp. nov	Valid	Tabuce et al.	Eocene (Lutetian)		Senegal	An early proboscid. The type species is S. gorodiskii.	

==== Proboscidean research ====
- A study on the relationship between brain size and body mass in the evolutionary history of the proboscideans is published by Benoit et al. (2019).
- New proboscidean remains from the late Miocene (Turolian) of Samos Island (Greece), representing juvenile individuals of deinotheres, choerolophodonts and amebelodonts, are described by Konidaris & Koufos (2019).
- Revision of proboscidean fossils from the Pliocene site of Kanapoi (Kenya) is published online by Sanders (2019).
- A study comparing the diversity of elephantimorph proboscideans of northern and southern China during the late Miocene is published by Wang et al. (2019).
- A study on the intestinal contents of two late-glacial mastodons preserved in lake sediments in Ohio and Michigan (Burning Tree mastodon and Heisler mastodon), and on their implications for inferring diet and habitats of these specimens, is published by Birks et al. (2019).
- A study on the diet of end-Pleistocene mastodons and mammoths from North America is published online by Cammidge, Kooyman & Theodor (2019).
- New fossil material of Choerolophodon from the early and middle Miocene of China is reported by Li et al. (2019).
- A study on the diet of the American gomphotheres, as indicated by stable isotope data from tooth enamel and dentine from tusks, is published online by Pérez-Crespo et al. (2019).
- Mothé, Ferretti & Avilla (2019) support the validity of Notiomastodon as a genus separate from Stegomastodon, arguing that members of the genus Stegomastodon were absent from South America.
- Description of teeth of a member of the genus Anancus from the Miocene (Turolian) locality Chomateri (Greece), constituting the first late Miocene record of this genus in Greece, and a revision of the late Miocene anancines from Europe, is published by Konidaris & Roussiakis (2019).
- A skull of a derived member of the genus Tetralophodon of uncertain specific assignment is described from the late Miocene of the Ouarzazate Basin (Morocco) by Geraads, Zouhri & Markov (2019).
- A study on the evolution of the genus Palaeoloxodon, as indicated by data on skull morphology, is published online by Larramendi et al. (2019).
- A study on fossil molars of Elephas jolensis from the Pleistocene Kibish Formation (Kenya) and on the timing and causes of extinction of members of the genus Elephas in Africa is published online by Manthi et al. (2019).
- A mammoth skeleton, probably belonging to a member of the species Mammuthus rumanus, is described from the Erq el Ahmar Elephant Site (Central Jordan Valley part of the Dead Sea Transform, Israel) by Rabinovich et al. (2019), representing the first known skeleton of a member of this species from the southern Levant.
- A study on the chemical composition, microstructure and mechanical properties of tusk dentine from woolly mammoth and from extant African elephant, and on its implications for inferring the utility of mammoth ivory as a raw material for Late Pleistocene osseous projectile points, is published by Pfeifer et al. (2019).
- Stable carbon and nitrogen data of woolly mammoth fossils from north-eastern Siberia ranging throughout the last ~50,000 years of the existence of this species is presented by Kuitems et al. (2019).
- A study on the age and origin of the Berelyokh mammoth site in northeast Siberia published by Lozhkin & Anderson (2018) is criticized by Pitulko et al. (2019).
- Nucleus-like structures are extracted from Yuka mammoth specimen by Yamagata et al. (2019), who visualise their dynamics after transfer into living mouse oocytes.
- A study on the isotopic compositions of carbon, nitrogen and sulfur in collagen in the population of woolly mammoths from the Wrangel Island (Russia), aiming to determine the ecology of the Wrangel Island mammoth population and most likely cause of its extinction, is published by Arppe et al. (2019).
- A study on the cause of the extinction of the Columbian mammoth, using mathematical modelling to test the overkill hypothesis, is published by Klapman & Capaldi (2019).
- A study on the diet of coexisting early Late Pleistocene Asian elephants and members of the species Stegodon orientalis, as indicated by data from stable isotope analyses of enamel of teeth from the Quzai Cave (southern China), is published by Ma et al. (2019).
- A review of Pleistocene proboscideans from the Eastern Mediterranean islands is published by Athanassiou, van der Geer & Lyras (2019).

=== Sirenia ===
Name	Novelty	Status	Authors	Age	Type locality	Country	Notes	Images
Culebratherium	Gen. et sp. nov	Valid	Velez-Juarbe & Wood	Early Miocene	Culebra Formation	Panama	A dugongine dugong. The type species is C. alemani.	
Norosiren	Gen. et sp. nov	Valid	Samonds et al.	Miocene	Mahajanga Basin	Madagascar	A dugongid dugong. The type species is N. zazavavindrano.	
Stegosiren	Gen. et sp. nov	Valid	Domning & Beatty	Oligocene	Ashley Formation; Chandler Bridge Formation	United States (South Carolina)	A dugongid dugong. The type species is S. macei.	

==== Sirenian research ====
- Description of the hindlimb bones of Sobrarbesiren cardieli is published online by Díaz-Berenguer et al. (2019).
- Dugongid fossils are described from the Oligocene (Rupelian) Borysthenic Formation (Ukraine) by Gol'din, Kovalchuk & Krakhmalnaya (2019), representing the first known sirenian record from inner seas of the Old World (Paratethys).
- Three dugongid specimens preserving the first sirenian endocranial casts from the West Indies reported so far are described from the upper Oligocene–lower Miocene Colón Formation (Cuba) by Orihuela, López & Macrini (2019).

=== Other afrotherians ===
Name	Novelty	Status	Authors	Age	Type locality	Country	Notes	Images
Eteketoni	Gen. et sp. nov	Valid	Pickford	Early Miocene		Uganda	An orycteropodid relative of the aardvark. The type species is E. platycephalus.	

== Euarchontoglires ==
=== Lagomorpha ===
==== Lagomorph research ====
- A study on the phylogenetic relationships of rodents and lagomorphs, based on data from extant and fossil taxa, is published by Asher et al. (2019).

=== Rodentia ===
Name	Novelty	Status	Authors	Age	Type locality	Country	Notes	Images
Altasciurus leonardi	Sp. nov	Valid	Korth et al.	Oligocene	Brule	United States (North Dakota)	A member of the family Aplodontiidae belonging to the subfamily Prosciurinae	
Aplodontia minor	Sp. nov	Valid	Hopkins	Late Hemphillian		United States (Oregon)	A relative of the mountain beaver	
Borsodia prechinensis	Sp. nov	Valid	Zheng, Zhang & Cui	Late Pliocene−Early Pleistocene	Nihewan	China	A member of Arvicolinae	
Capromys pilorides lewisi	Subsp. nov	Valid	Morgan et al.	Late Pleistocene-Holocene		Cayman Islands	A subspecies of Desmarest's hutia	
Cardiatherium calingastaense	Sp. nov	Valid	Cerdeño et al.	Late Miocene	Las Flores	Argentina	A relative of the capybara. Announced in 2018; the final version of the article naming it was published in 2019.	
"Cricetodon" venczeli	Sp. nov	Valid	Hír, Codrea & Prieto	Miocene		Romania	A large hamster. Announced in 2019; the final version of the article naming it was published in 2020.	
Cupressimus perissos	Sp. nov	Valid	Storer	Eocene (Chadronian)	Cypress Hills Formation	Canada (Saskatchewan)	A member of the family Eomyidae	
Deperetomys calefactus	Sp. nov	Valid	Marković et al.	Late Oligocene		Bosnia and Herzegovina	A member of Cricetodontinae	
Deperetomys saltensis	Sp. nov	Valid	Marković et al.	Late Oligocene		Serbia	A member of Cricetodontinae	
Ecclesimus mcdougalli	Sp. nov	Valid	Storer	Eocene (Chadronian)	Cypress Hills Formation	Canada (Saskatchewan)	A member of the family Florentiamyidae	
Eumys lammersi	Sp. nov	Valid	Korth et al.	Oligocene	Brule	United States (North Dakota)	A member of the family Cricetidae	
Geocapromys caymanensis	Sp. nov	Valid	Morgan et al.	Late Pleistocene-Holocene		Cayman Islands	A species of Geocapromys	
Gobiocylindrodon	Gen. et sp. nov	In press	Li et al.	Eocene	Erlian	China	A member of the family Cylindrodontidae. Genus includes new species G. ulausuensis.	
Heliscomys borealis	Sp. nov	Valid	Korth et al.	Oligocene	Brule	United States (North Dakota)	A member of the family Heliscomyidae	
Heterocricetodon serbicus	Sp. nov	Valid	Marković et al.	Oligocene		Serbia	A member of the family Muridae belonging to the subfamily Pseudocricetodontinae	
Japaneomys	Gen. et sp. nov	Valid	Kimura et al.	Early Miocene	Nakamura	Japan	A member of the family Eomyidae. The type species is J. yasunoi.	
Liodontia bathypotamos	Sp. nov	Valid	Hopkins	Late Hemingfordian		United States (Montana)	A member of the family Aplodontiidae	
Liodontia dailyi	Sp. nov	Valid	Hopkins	Late Hemingfordian		United States (Nevada)	A member of the family Aplodontiidae	
Maquiamys	Gen. et comb. nov	Valid	Boivin in Boivin, Marivaux & Antoine	Late Oligocene	Chambira	Peru	A member of the superfamily Chinchilloidea. The type species is "Scleromys" praecursor Boivin	
Metanoiamys woodi	Sp. nov	Valid	Korth	Oligocene (Orellan)	Sage Creek	United States (Montana)	A member of the family Eomyidae	
Mimomys nihewanensis	Sp. nov	Valid	Zheng, Zhang & Cui	Late Pliocene	Nihewan	China	A member of Arvicolinae	
Monamys	Gen. et comb. nov	Valid	Sallam & Seiffert	Oligocene (Rupelian)	Jebel Qatrani	Egypt	A member of Phiomorpha. The type species is "Paraphiomys" simonsi Wood (1968).	
Montanamus taranae	Sp. nov	Valid	Storer	Eocene (Chadronian)	Cypress Hills Formation	Canada (Saskatchewan)	A member of the family Eomyidae.	
Natrona	Gen. et sp. nov	Valid	Dawson	Uintan and Duchesnean	Wagon Bed	United States (Wyoming)	A member of the family Sciuravidae. The type species is N. natronensis.	
Paradjidaumo obritschorum	Sp. nov	Valid	Korth, Boyd & Person	Oligocene (Whitneyan)	Brule	United States (North Dakota)	A member of the family Eomyidae	
Paraethomys balearicus	Sp. nov	Valid	Torres Roig et al.	Pliocene (Zanclean)		Spain	A member of the family Muridae belonging to the subfamily Murinae	
Petaurista tetyukhensis	Sp. nov	In press	Tiunov & Gimranov	Late Pleistocene		Russia	A species of Petaurista. Announced in 2019; the final version of the article naming it is scheduled to be published in 2020.	
Pitymys simplicidens	Sp. nov	Valid	Zheng, Zhang & Cui	Early Pleistocene	Nihewan	China	A species of Pitymys	
Pliosiphneus daodiensis	Sp. nov	Valid	Zheng, Zhang & Cui	Late Pliocene	Nihewan	China	A zokor	
Pliosiphneus puluensis	Sp. nov	Valid	Zheng, Zhang & Cui	Late Pliocene	Nihewan	China	A zokor	
Proclinodontomys	Gen. et sp. et comb. nov	Valid	Candela et al.	Early-Middle Pleistocene and early Holocene		Argentina Brazil; Bolivia?	A member of the family Echimyidae. The type species is P. dondasi; genus also includes "Mesomys" mordax Winge (1887).	
Progonomys manolo	Sp. nov	Valid	López Antoñanzas et al.	Late Miocene		Lebanon	A member of the family Muridae belonging to the subfamily Murinae	
Prosciurus hogansoni	Sp. nov	Valid	Korth et al.	Oligocene	Brule	United States (North Dakota)	A member of the family Aplodontiidae belonging to the subfamily Prosciurinae	
Prosigmodon tecolotum	Sp. nov	Valid	Pacheco Castro, Carranza Castañeda & Jiménez Hidalgo	Early Pliocene (late Hemphillian)	Tecolotlán (San José)	Mexico	A member of Sigmodontini	
Protorepomys	Gen. et 2 sp. nov	Valid	Martin & Zakrzewski	Hemphillian	Shutler	United States (Oregon)	A member of the family Cricetidae belonging to the subfamily Neotominae. The type species is P. mckayensis; genus also includes P. bartlettensis.	
Pseudocricetodon heissigi	Sp. nov	Valid	Marković et al.	Oligocene		Serbia	A member of the family Muridae belonging to the subfamily Pseudocricetodontinae	
Saremmys	Gen. et sp. nov	Valid	Busker, Pérez & Dozo	Miocene (Colhuehuapian)		Argentina	A member of Chinchilloidea of uncertain phylogenetic placement. Genus includes new species S. ligcura.	
Spermophilinus kumkolensis	Sp. nov	Valid	Li et al.	Middle Miocene	Shimagou	China	A member of the family Sciuridae belonging to the subfamily Sciurinae. Announced in 2019; the final version of the article naming it was published in 2020.	
Spermophilus praecox	Sp. nov	Valid	Sinitsa & Pogodina	Late Pliocene and Early Pleistocene		Ukraine	A species of Spermophilus	
Tsaphanomys	Gen. et comb. nov	Valid	Martin & Zakrzewski	Hemphillian	Grassy Mountain	United States (Oregon)	A member of the family Cricetidae belonging to the subfamily Neotominae. The type species is "Paronychomys" shotwelli Korth (2011).	
Typhlomys storchi	Sp. nov	Valid	Qiu & Ni	Late Miocene	Xiaohe	China	A relative of the Chinese pygmy dormouse	
Wilsoneumys focarius	Sp. nov	Valid	Korth	Oligocene (Orellan)	Sage Creek	United States (Montana)	A member of the family Cricetidae	

==== Rodent research ====
- A study on the upper incisors of extant southern African rodents, evaluating whether the morphology of isolated rodent incisors can be used to provide dietary information, is published by Paine et al. (2019), who also apply their dietary model to fossil rodent incisors from the South African hominin-bearing sites Sterkfontein and Swartkrans.
- A study on the anatomy and affinities of rodent teeth from the early Miocene sites of Napak (Uganda) and on probable diets of rodents from these sites is published by Bento Da Costa et al. (2019).
- A study on the phylogenetic relationships of extant and fossil caviomorph rodents is published by Boivin, Marivaux & Antoine (2019), who name new clades Erethicavioi Boivin and Octochinchilloi Boivin.
- A study on the enamel microstructure of the incisors of caviomorph rodents from the Eocene and Oligocene localities in Peruvian Amazon is published by Boivin et al. (2019).
- A study on the anatomy of three tarsal bones of Eocene caviomorph rodents from Peruvian Amazon, and on their implications for inferring the locomotor behaviors of these rodents, is published by Boivin et al. (2019).
- New fossils of caviomorph rodents are described from the Paleogene of the vicinity of the cities of Juanjui and Balsayacu (Peruvian Amazonia) by Assemat et al. (2019).
- A study on the morphology of the limb bones of caviomorph rodents from the Miocene Santa Cruz Formation of Patagonia, and on its implications for interpreting the use of substrate by these rodents, is published by Muñoz et al. (2019).
- A study on the evolution of the variation of the mandibular shape in caviomorph rodents is published online by Álvarez, Ercoli & Verzi (2019).
- A study on the enamel microstructure of the incisors of the hystricognaths and anomaluroids from the Oligocene of Western Sahara is published by Marivaux et al. (2019).
- A study on the phylogenetic relationships and evolutionary history of early hystricognaths is published by Marivaux & Boivin (2019).
- A study on the morphology of the lower deciduous premolars of extant and fossil caviomorph rodents and its implications for inferring the phylogenetic relationships of fossil caviomorphs is published by Verzi, Olivares & Morgan (2019), who argue that Eocene genus Cachiyacuy might be a stem-octodontoid.
- A study on the anatomy and phylogenetic relationships of the dolichotine caviid rodent Prodolichotis prisca is published by Madozzo-Jaén (2019).
- Description of a well-preserved skull of Telicomys giganteus, estimation of body mass and analysis of the bite mechanics of this species is published by Rinderknecht et al. (2019).
- A study on the morphology of the ossicles of the extinct neoepiblemid rodent Perimys and of extant and extinct caviomorph rodents in general is published by Kerber & Sánchez-Villagra (2019).
- A study on the morphology of cheek teeth, teeth replacement and systematics of members of the genus Neoepiblema is published by Kerber, Negri & Sanfelice (2019).
- A study on the anatomy of the skull of Neoepiblema acreensis is published by Kerber, Ferreira & Negri (2019).
- A study on the morphology of upper molars of extant and fossils members of Chinchilloidea, and on the phylogenetic relationships of members of this group, is published by Rasia & Candela (2019).
- Description of a new specimen of Litodontomys from the Deseadan of Argentina and a study on the phylogenetic relationships of this taxon is published by Busker & Dozo (2019).
- Nine virtual skull endocasts of members of the family Ischyromyidae (members of the genera Pseudotomus, Notoparamys, Reithroparamys and Rapamys) are reconstructed by Bertrand et al. (2019).
- Description of the skull anatomy of the Pleistocene ground squirrel "Urocitellus" nogaici and a study on the phylogenetic relationships of this species and other European ground squirrel species previously attributed to Urocitellus is published by Sinitsa, Pogodina & Кryuchkova (2019), who transfer "U." nogaici, "U." polonicus and "U." primigenius to the genus Spermophilus.
- A study on the living and extinct species of Spermophilus from Europe, focusing on factors affecting species distribution and speciation, is published by Popova et al. (2019).
- New specimen of Trogontherium cuvieri is described from the upper Pleistocene of the Songhua River drainage area near Harbin (Heilongjiang, China) by Yang et al. (2019), documenting the survival of this species into the late Pleistocene in northeast China.
- A study on the ecology of giant beavers, as indicated by stable isotope data, is published by Plint, Longstaffe & Zazula (2019).
- Coster et al. (2019) describe a well-preserved astragalus of the anomaluroid Pondaungimys anomaluropsis from the Eocene Pondaung Formation (Myanmar), and evaluate its implications for inferring the anatomy and phylogenetic relationships of this species.
- A study on impact of climate changes on the populations of the bushy-tailed woodrat in western North America over the late Quaternary is published by Balk, Betancourt & Smith (2019).
- A study on the evolutionary change in body mass and correlated ecological variables over the 3.75 million year history of the North American muskrat is published by Martin (2019).
- A study on the morphological variation in Middle to Late Pleistocene populations of the common vole and the field vole from northern Iberian Peninsula and southern France is published by Luzi & López-García (2019).
- Lyman (2019) describes four molars of the water vole from the late Holocene Stemilt Creek Village archaeological site (Washington, United States), and evaluates the implications of this finding for reconstructions of local environment in prehistoric times.
- A study on melanin pigment distribution in 3-million-year-old specimens of the Old World field mouse species Apodemus atavus is published by Manning et al. (2019).
- A study on the diet, habitat and timing and cause of extinction of the Tenerife giant rat (Canariomys bravoi) is published by Crowley et al. (2019).
- Three molar fossils of the greater bandicoot rat are described from the Middle Pleistocene of Taiwan by Kawamura, Chang & Kawamura (2019), indicating that this species inhabited Taiwan in the early Middle Pleistocene.
- A study on variations of size of fossil murine rodents from Liang Bua (Flores, Indonesia) through time, and on their implications for reconstructions of paleoclimate and paleoenvironment of Flores, is published by Veatch et al. (2019).
- A study on the femur histology of an extinct (late Quaternary) form of Timorese giant rat is published by Miszkiewicz, Louys & O'Connor (2019).

== Laurasiatheria ==
=== Artiodactyla ===
==== Cetaceans ====
Name	Novelty	Status	Authors	Age	Type locality	Country	Notes	Images
Aegicetus	Gen. et sp. nov	Valid	Gingerich, Antar & Zalmout	Eocene (Priabonian)	Gehannam Formation	Egypt	A protocetid. The type species is A. gehennae.	
Borealodon	Gen. et sp. nov	Valid	Shipps, Peredo & Pyenson	Oligocene (Rupelian)	Pysht Formation	United States (Washington)	A stem-mysticete. The type species is B. osedax.	
Casatia	Gen. et sp. nov	Valid	Bianucci et al.	Early Pliocene		Italy	A monodontid. The type species is C. thermophila.	
Kentriodon nakajimai	Sp. nov	Valid	Kimura & Hasegawa	Miocene (Serravallian/Tortonian)	Haraichi Formation	Japan	A Kentriodontid.	
Miobalaenoptera	Gen. et sp. nov	Valid	Tanaka & Watanabe	Late Miocene	Horokaoshirarika Formation	Japan	A rorqual. The type species is M. numataensis.	
Nehalaennia	Gen. et sp. nov	Valid	Bisconti, Munsterman & Post	Miocene (late Tortonian)	Breda Formation	Netherlands	A rorqual. The type species is N. devossi.	
Niparajacetus	Gen. et sp. nov	Valid	Solis-Añorve, González-Barba & Hernández-Rivera	Oligocene (Chattian)	El Cien Formation	Mexico	An aetiocetoid baleen whale. The type species is N. palmadentis	
Norrisanima miocaena	Gen. et comb. nov	Valid	Leslie, Peredo & Pyenson	Miocene (late Tortonian)	Monterey Formation	United States (California)	A Pan-balaenopteroid. The type species is "Megaptera" miocaena Kellogg (1922).	
Peregocetus	Gen. et sp. nov	Valid	Lambert et al.	Eocene (Lutetian)	Pisco Basin	Peru	A protocetid. The type species is P. pacificus.	
Pliokogia	Gen. et sp. nov	Valid	Collareta, Cigala Fulgosi & Bianucci	Pliocene (Zanclean)		Italy	A kogiid sperm whale. The type species is P. apenninica.	
Tranatocetus maregermanicum	Sp. nov	Valid	Marx et al.	Late Miocene	Breda Formation	Netherlands	A Cetotheriid mysticete	
Tupelocetus	Gen. et sp. nov	Valid	Gibson, Mnieckowski & Geisler	Eocene (Bartonian)	Tupelo Bay Formation	United States (South Carolina)	A protocetid. The type species is T. palmeri.	
Yaquinacetus	Fam., Gen. et sp. nov	Valid	Lambert, Godfrey & Fitzgerald	Latest Oligocene–early Miocene	Nye Mudstone	United States (Oregon)	A Squaloziphiid relative of Squaloziphius. The type species is Y. meadi.	

===== Cetacean research =====
- A review of the Eocene fossil record of cetaceans from Antarctica is published by Buono et al. (2019).
- Partial skeleton of an archaeocete is described from the Paleogene Tongeren Formation (the Netherlands) by van Vliet et al. (2019).
- New protocetid fossils, including a nearly complete articulated forelimb providing new information on the locomotion and forelimb evolution of early cetaceans, are described from the upper Lutetian of Senegal by Vautrin et al. (2019).
- A study on the evolution of the ossicles in early cetaceans, as indicated by data from a partially complete ossicular chain of a protocetid specimen collected in Eocene (Lutetian) phosphate deposits at Kpogamé (Togo), is published by Mourlam & Orliac (2019).
- A study on the anatomy of the olfactory and respiratory turbinates of Aegyptocetus tarfa is published online by Peri et al. (2019).
- A study on the morphology of teeth and enamel microstructure of two fossil cetaceans from Antarctica (a basilosaurid from the La Meseta Formation and a member of the genus Llanocetus from the Submeseta Formation) is published online by Loch et al. (2019).
- Partly preserved tail vertebra of a basilosaurid is described from the Eocene Cajaruro Formation (Peru) by Davydenko, Laime & Gol'din (2019), representing the first record of an Eocene marine mammal from the northwestern Amazon region.
- The discovery of over a hundred basilosaurid specimens from the middle to upper Eocene Gehannam and Birket Qaroun formation (Wadi El Hitan, Egypt) is reported by Mahdy et al. (2019), who also compare the anatomy and habitat of Dorudon atrox and extant killer whale.
- A study on the stomach contents of a new specimen of Basilosaurus isis from Wadi Al Hitan in Egypt is published by Voss et al. (2019).
- A study on the variation in feeding behavior of fossil toothed whales with extremely long rostra is published by McCurry & Pyenson (2019).
- A study on the evolution of echolocation of toothed whales, as indicated by the anatomy of a skull of a toothed whale from the Oligocene Pysht Formation (Washington, United States) resembling Olympicetus avitus, is published by Racicot et al. (2019).
- Redescription of the holotype and referred specimen of Prosqualodon australis from the Miocene Gaiman Formation (Argentina) and a study on the phylogenetic relationships of this species is published by Gaetán, Buono & Gaetano (2019).
- Isolated teeth resembling tooth taxon Phococetus vasconum are described from the Pungo River Formation (North Carolina, United States) by Boessenecker (2019), who also notes their similarities to the teeth of Inticetus vertizi, and suggests that Phococetus may be an Inticetus-like, large heterodont toothed whale.
- A study on the anatomy and phylogenetic relationships of Phoberodon arctirostris is published by Viglino et al. (2019).
- An isolated tooth of an Inticetus-like cetacean is described from the Miocene deposits close to the village of Melpignano (Province of Lecce, Italy) by Peri et al. (2019), who also review the geographic distribution of fossils of Inticetus-like cetaceans.
- A skull of a late Miocene beaked whale belonging or related to the species Messapicetus longirostris, imaged by means of computed tomography rather than being extracted mechanically from the stone matrix, is described from Menorca (Spain) by Bianucci et al. (2019).
- A new beaked whale specimen, with anatomy indicating that it relied primarily on suction feeding, is described from the upper Miocene Gram Formation (Denmark) by Ramassamy & Lauridsen (2019).
- A study on the anatomy and phylogenetic relationships of Diaphorocetus poucheti is published online by Paolucci et al. (2019).
- A study on dental damage in a set of teeth of Scaldicetus caretti from the Miocene of Belgium is published by Lambert & Bianucci (2019), who interpret this damage as evidence indicating that S. caretti was a macroraptorial (rather than suction-feeding) top predator.
- A study on the anatomy and phylogenetic relationships of Mystacodon selenensis is published by de Muizon et al. (2019).
- Three premolar teeth of a member of the genus Llanocetus reaching an estimated total body length of up to 12 m are described from the Eocene Submeseta Formation (Seymour Island, Antarctica) by Marx et al. (2019), who interpret these fossils as indicative of at least two independent origins of gigantism in baleen whale evolutionary history.
- A study aiming to explain the disappearance of baleen whales from the fossil record from 23 Ma to 18–17 Ma is published by Marx, Fitzgerald & Fordyce (2019).
- New specimen of Joumocetus shimizui, providing new information on the anatomy of this species, is described from the Miocene Haraichi Formation (Japan) by Kimura & Hasegawa (2019).
- A study on the age of fossil gray whale finds from Florida and Georgia is published by Garrison et al. (2019).
- Partial forelimb of a rorqual with several shark bite marks is described from the Pliocene Burica Formation (Panama) by Cortés et al. (2019).
- Partial skeleton of a Pleistocene blue whale with an estimated total body length of 23.4–26.1 m, representing the largest whale fossil reported so far, is described from the Lago di San Giuliano (Italy) by Bianucci et al. (2019), who also estimate body size of a specimen of Pelocetus from the Middle miocene locality of Mal Paso and two late Miocene rorquals from the Cerro Los Quesos site (Pisco Formation, Peru), and evaluate the implications of these fossils for the knowledge of evolution of gigantism of baleen whales.
- A study on the cetacean-bearing Miocene Gaiman Formation (Argentina), and on its implications for inferring which factors affected the distribution and preservation of fossil cetaceans in several localities of the Southwestern Atlantic Ocean, is published by Cuitiño et al. (2019).
- A study on the diversity and abundance of cetaceans in the area of present-day Italy through the Pliocene, as indicated by chronostratigraphic data from Castell'Arquato Basin (northern Apennine Mountains), is published by Freschi et al. (2019).
- A study on the oxygen isotope composition of whale barnacle shells from three Pleistocene localities along the eastern Pacific coast, and on their implications for the knowledge of the history of whale migrations, is published by Taylor et al. (2019).

==== Other artiodactyls ====
Name	Novelty	Status	Authors	Age	Type locality	Country	Notes	Images
Cervus canadensis combrayicus	Subsp. nov	Valid	Croitor	Late Pleistocene		France	A subspecies of the elk. Announced in 2019; the final version of the article naming it was published in 2020.	
Decennatherium asiaticum	Sp. nov	Valid	Rios, Danowitz & Solounias	Late Miocene		Pakistan		
Dorcatherium dehmi	Sp. nov	Valid	Guzmán-Sandoval & Rössner	Miocene		Pakistan	A chevrotain.	
Elaphurus davidianus predavidianus	Subsp. nov	Valid	Dong et al.	Early Pleistocene	Nihewan Formation	China	A subspecies of the Père David's deer.	
Hispanomeryx lacetanus	Sp. nov	Valid	Sánchez et al.	Miocene (Vallesian)		Spain	A member of the family Moschidae.	
Kubanochoerus parvus	Sp. nov	Valid	Hou & Deng	Latest Middle or earliest Late Miocene		China	A member of the family Suidae belonging to the subfamily Listriodontinae.	
Kubwachoerus	Gen. et comb. et sp. nov	Valid	Pickford & Tsujikawa	Miocene	Aka Aiteputh Formation	Kenya; Libya	A member of the family Suidae related to Kubanochoerus. Genus includes K. khinzikebirus (Wilkinson, 1976) and K. marymuunguae (Van der Made, 1996), as well as a new species K. nyakachensis.	
Megaloceros matritensis	Sp. nov	Valid	Van der Made	Middle Pleistocene		Spain		
Palaeochoerus australis	Sp. nov	Valid	Pickford & Tsujikawa	Miocene		Namibia	A member of the family Suidae.	
Palaeoryx minor	Sp. nov	Valid	Vasileiadis, Tsoukala & Kostopoulos	Late Miocene		Greece	A bovid.	
Qurliqnoria chorakensis	Sp. nov	Valid	Kostopoulos et al.	Late Miocene		Turkey	A stem-caprine bovid. Announced in 2019; the final version of the article naming it was published in 2020.	

===== Other artiodactyl research =====
- A study on the phylogenetic relationships and timing of the origin of Cetartiodactyla is published by Zurano et al. (2019).
- A study on the teeth eruption pattern of a wide range of extinct cetartiodactyl families is published by Rodrigues et al. (2019).
- Description of an articulated postcranial skeleton of an oreodont from the Oligocene Tehuitzingo Formation, representing the first postcranial skeleton of an oreodont from Mexico reported so far, is published online by Ferrusquía-Villafranca & Ruiz-González (2019).
- New specimen of the fossil peccary Parachoerus carlesi is described from the Upper Pleistocene of the Chaco Province of Argentina by Gasparini et al. (2019), representing the most complete fossil material of a member this species reported so far, and providing new information on the morphology of the species and the environment it lived in.
- A study on the paleobiology of the fossil peccary Platygonus compressus, based on fossils from Bat Cave (Missouri, United States), is published by Woodruff & Schubert (2019).
- A description of the skull anatomy of the fossil suid Nyanzachoerus jaegeri based on new fossil material and a study on the phylogenetic relationships of the species is published by Reda, Lazagabaster & Haile-Selassie (2019).
- New fossil suid specimens, providing new information on the classification and relationships of the Miocene Suinae from China, are described from the latest Miocene site of Shuitangba (Zhaotong Basin, China) by Hou et al. (2019).
- A study on the diet of Pliocene suids from the Australopithecus anamensis site of Kanapoi and the Australopithecus afarensis site of Hadar is published by Lazagabaster (2019).
- Description of deer fossils from the Pleistocene localities in Buenos Aires Province (Argentina), including the southernmost record of the genus Morenelaphus and the species M. lujanensis, is published by Chimento et al. (2019).
- A systematic, macroscopic, radiographic, and histologic study of the fossil bones of the Cretan deer Candiacervus will be published by Lyras et al. (2019), who interpret their findings as indicative of the occurrence of a metabolic bone disease in the Cretan deer population, probably caused by habitat degradation.
- New fossil material of Eucladoceros boulei, providing new information on the anatomy of this species, is described from the Shanshenmiaozui site in the Nihewan Basin (China) by Tong & Zhang (2019).
- A study comparing the characteristics of the postcranial skeletons of Arvernoceros ardei and Cervus perrieri is published online by Pfeiffer-Deml (2019).
- A study on the age and morphometrics of a partial fossil caribou antler from Graham Island (Canada) is published by Mathewes, Richards & Reimchen (2019).
- A study on the ontogenetic variation of the antlers of the Yabe's giant deer (Sinomegaceros yabei) reported from all over Japan is published by Taruno, Okumura & Ishida (2019).
- A study on the pattern of extinction of the Irish elk, as indicated by radiocarbon data from fossil specimens from western and eastern Europe, is published by Lister & Stuart (2019).
- A study testing whether the antlers of the Irish elk could have withstood forces generated during fighting is published by Klinkhamer et al. (2019).
- A mandible of the giant muntjac (Muntiacus gigas, considered by the authors to be synonymous with M. vuquangensis) is described from the Late Pleistocene to Early Holocene deposits in the cave site of Hang Boi (Vietnam) by Stimpson et al. (2019).
- A study on the diet of the late Pleistocene Indian muntjacs from Sumatra, as indicated by data from fossil teeth from cave sites of Lida Ajer, Sibrambang and Jambu, is published by Wirkner & Hertler (2019).
- A study on the long- and short-term dietary behavior of the Miocene moschids Micromeryx flourensianus and M.? eiselei, as indicated by data from tooth wear, is published by Aiglstorfer & Semprebon (2019).
- A revision of putative fossil material of Lagomeryx reported from the Miocene locality Ulan Tolgoi (Loh Formation; Mongolia) is published by Mennecart et al. (2019), who reinterpret this material of fossils of a moschid, representing the first Miocene moschid remains from Mongolia.
- Description of new specimens of Sardomeryx oschiriensis from the Miocene (Burdigalian) of Sardinia (Italy) and a study on the phylogenetic relationships of this species is published by Mennecart et al. (2019).
- The first detailed description of the giraffid species Schansitherium tafeli is published by Hou et al. (2019), who compare this taxon with Samotherium boissieri.
- Description of an almost complete skull and a second partial skull of Bohlinia attic from the late Miocene of Maragheh (Iran), as well as a complete upper dentition of a member of this species from Samos (Greece), is published by Parizad et al. (2019).
- New skull remains of Decennatherium rex are described from the late Miocene (Vallesian) Batallones-4 site (Cerro de los Batallones fossil site complex, Spain) by Ríos & Morales (2019).
- A revision of giraffid fossils from the late Miocene of the Thermopigi site (Greece) is published by Xafis et al. (2019).
- A study on the evolution of Neogene bovids from central Myanmar is published by Nishioka et al. (2019), who also describe new caprine and bovine specimens from the upper Miocene to Pliocene part of the Irrawaddy beds.
- Description of new fossil material of Leptobos merlai from the early late Villafranchian of Umbria (Italy), providing new information on the anatomy of this species, is published by Cherin, D'Allestro & Masini (2019).
- Description of new fossil remains of spiral horned antelope Spirocerus wongi from Nihewan Formation (Shanxi, China) and a study on the taxonomy and phylogenetic relationships of the genus Spirocerus is published by Bai et al. (2019).
- New fossil material of the stem-caprine species Olonbulukia tsaidamensis is described from the Wuzhong region of northern China by Wang et al. (2019), who also revise fossil stem-caprine taxa from the Wuzhong Fauna and so-called "Qaidam Fauna".
- A study on past distribution of the long-tailed goral and causes of its range shift over time, based on data from fossil specimens from the Paleolithic sites, is published by Kim et al. (2019).
- New specimen of Bubalus murrensis, representing the westernmost occurrence of this species, is described from Médoc (France) by Koenigswald et al. (2019).
- A study on the paleoecology of Northern Great Plains bisons from the late Pleistocene and throughout the Holocene, based on carbon and nitrogen isotope data from bison specimens from 22 archaeological sites across the Northern Great Plains, is published by Davies et al. (2019).
- Entelodontid teeth are described from the late Eocene of the Krabi coal mine in southern Thailand by Ducrocq, Chaimanee & Jaeger (2019), representing the southernmost occurrence of entelodontids in Asia during the Paleogene reported so far.
- An upper molar of the anthracothere Sivameryx palaeindicus is described from the early Miocene Kamus Junction site (Israel) by Grossman et al. (2019).
- A study on the paleoecology of Pleistocene Mediterranean dwarf hippos is published by Bethune et al. (2019).
- The first directly dated fossil of a member of the genus Hexaprotodon (an upper right canine fragment) from the Narmada Valley of Central India is described by Jukar et al. (2019), who also present a tentative extinction chronology of Hexaprotodon, indicating that this genus survived into the Early Holocene.
- Putative helohyids Pakkokuhyus and Progenitohyus are transferred to the family Dichobunidae by Ducrocq (2019).

==== Carnivorans ====
Name	Novelty	Status	Authors	Age	Type locality	Country	Notes	Images
Agriotherium hendeyi	Sp. nov	Valid	Jiangzuo & Flynn	Late Hemphillian	Quiburis	United States (Arizona)	Announced in 2019; the final version of the article naming it was published in 2020.	
Amblonyx barryi	Sp. nov	Valid	Jiangzuo, Yu & Flynn	Pliocene	Sivalik Hills	Nepal	A relative of the Asian small-clawed otter. Announced in 2019; the final version of the article naming it was published in 2021.	
Amphicyon zhanxiangi	Sp. nov	Valid	Jiangzuo et al.	early Middle Miocene		China	A bear dog	
Amphimachairodus alvarezi	Sp. nov	Valid	Ruiz-Ramoni, Rincón & Montellano-Ballesteros	Late Hemphillian		Mexico	A machairodontine felid	
Ballusia zhegalloi	Sp. nov	Valid	Sotnikova et al.	Early Miocene		Mongolia; Russia	A bear. Announced in 2019; the final version of the article naming it was published in 2021.	
Corumictis	Gen. et sp. et comb. nov	Valid	Paterson in Paterson et al.	Oligocene (Arikareean) and early Miocene	John Day	France United States (Oregon)	A member of the family Mustelidae. The type species is C. wolsani; genus also includes "Plesictis" julieni Viret 1929.	
Cynelos anubisi	Sp. nov	Valid	Morlo et al.	Early Miocene		Egypt; Libya?	A bear dog. Originally described as a species of Cynelos; Morales & Pickford (2022) made it the type species of a separate genus Mogharacyon.	
Gobicyon acutus	Sp. nov	Valid	Jiangzuo et al.	late Middle Miocene		China	A bear dog belonging to the subfamily Haplocyoninae	
Gobicyon yei	Sp. nov	Valid	Jiangzuo et al.	early Middle Miocene		China	A bear dog belonging to the subfamily Haplocyoninae	
Hoplictis baihu	Sp. nov	Valid	Valenciano et al.	Middle Miocene	Halamagai	China	A member of the family Mustelidae	
Izmirictis	Gen. et sp. nov	Valid	Morales et al.	Early Miocene		Turkey	A member of Feliformia belonging to the family Lophocyonidae (new rank, formerly ranked as the subfamily Lophocyoninae within the Viverridae). Genus includes new species I. cani.	
Lartetictis pasalarensis	Sp. nov	Valid	Valenciano, Mayda & Alpagut	Middle Miocene		Turkey	An otter	
Leptofelis	Gen. et comb. nov	Valid	Salesa et al.	Late Miocene		Spain	A member of the family Felidae belonging to the subfamily Felinae; a new genus for "Styriofelis" vallesiensis Salesa et al. (2012). Announced in 2017; the final version of the article naming it was published in 2019.	
?Myacyon peignei	Sp. nov	Valid	Werdelin	Miocene (Serravallian)		Kenya	A bear dog	
Peignecyon	Gen. et sp. nov	Valid	Morales et al.	Early Miocene		Czech Republic	A bear dog belonging to the subfamily Thaumastocyoninae. The type species is P. felinoides.	
Peignictis	Gen. et sp. nov	Valid	De Bonis, Gardin & Blondel	Early Oligocene	Quercy	France	A member of Mustelida of uncertain phylogenetic placement. The type species is P. pseudamphictis.	
Trochictis peignei	Sp. nov	Valid	Morlo et al.	Miocene		Germany	A member of the family Mustelidae. Announced in 2019; the final version of the article naming it was published in 2021.	
Wangictis	Gen. et comb. nov	Valid	De Bonis, Gardin & Blondel	Early Oligocene	Wulanbulage	China	A member of Amphicynodontinae. The type species is "Pachycynodon" tedfordi Wang & Qiu (2003).	

===== Carnivoran research =====
- A study on the morphology of bony labyrinths of extant and fossil carnivorans, and on its implications for inferring hunting behaviours of extinct carnivorans, is published by Schwab et al. (2019).
- A study assess the usefulness of the scapholunar (one of the carpal bones) for determining ecology and habitat of carnivorans, based on data from living and extinct carnivorans, is published by Dunn et al. (2019).
- A study on the morphology and functional anatomy of the thoracolumbar and sacrocaudal regions of the vertebral column of Magericyon anceps is published online by Siliceo et al. (2019).
- Carnivoran fossils from the Hoyo Negro pit in the Sac Actun cave system (Mexico), initially identified as remains of a bear belonging to the genus Tremarctos and a coyote, a reinterpreted as remains of Arctotherium wingei and Protocyon troglodytes by Schubert et al. (2019), representing the first record of these taxa outside South America.
- Description of fossils of Nyctereutes donnezani from the early Pliocene locality of Çalta (Turkey), and study on the phylogenetic relationships of species belonging to the genus Nyctereutes, is published by Daguenet & Sen (2019).
- Revision of Pleistocene canid fossils from the Sangiran Dome (Java, Indonesia), evaluating their implications for the knowledge of the timing of the arrival of members of the genus Cuon in Java, is published by Volmer et al. (2019).
- A study on the taxonomy of the dire wolf, assessing whether fossils from Mexico and the western coast of the United States should be assigned to the distinct subspecies Canis dirus guildayi, is published by Ruiz-Ramoni & Montellano-Ballesteros (2019).
- A study on the origin of the current genetic uniqueness of the Italian wolves, as indicated by data from mitochondrial DNA of the Pleistocene and Holocene canid specimens from Italy, is published by Ciucani et al. (2019).
- A study on the age of dog remains from the Koster Site and Stilwell II site in Illinois, dated to between 10,190 and 9,630 cal BP, is published by Perri et al. (2019), who interpret these remains as representing the earliest confirmed evidence of domestic dogs in the Americas and the earliest confirmed individual dog burials anywhere in the world.
- A study on the history of pre-contact dogs in the North American Arctic, aiming to determine the relationship between dogs from archaeological Paleo-Inuit and Inuit sites and modern Arctic dog populations, is published by Ameen et al. (2019).
- Remains of Indarctos punjabiensis are described from the late Miocene locality of Las Casiones (Spain) by Abella et al. (2019), representing the last population of members of the subfamily Ailuropodinae from the Iberian fossil record, and possibly from Europe.
- A study on the trophic and ecological niche widths of ancient and modern pandas is published by Han et al. (2019).
- Nuclear genome of an ~5,000-year-old giant panda from Jiangdongshan (Yunnan, China) is sequenced by Sheng et al. (2019), who assign this specimen to a genetically distinct extinct population forming the sister group to all extant populations, and present evidence indicative of genetic admixture from this extinct population in extant pandas.
- A study on functional adaptations in the anatomy of the elbow joint of extant and fossil bears, and on its implications for inferring paleobiology of Quaternary fossil species of bears, is published by Meloro & de Oliveira (2019).
- A study on the evolution of the shape and size of the basicranium of bears, as indicated by data from extant and extinct taxa, is published by Arnaudo et al. (2019).
- A study on the evolution of bear teeth, and on its implications for inferring the phylogenetic placement of fossil bear taxa, is published by Jiangzuo, Liu & Chen (2019).
- A study on the diet of Agriotherium africanum from the South African fossil site of Langebaanweg, as indicated by tooth microwear, is published by Stynder et al. (2019).
- The first fossil of a member of the genus Agriotherium from Italy will be described by Bellucci et al. (2019).
- A study on the systematics and paleobiology of bears from the Dmanisi site (Georgia), and on their coexistence with early members of the genus Homo, is published by Medin et al. (2019).
- A study aiming to decipher the various factors influencing the isotopic composition of bones of a potentially omnivorous species like cave bear, as well examining how likely are the different interpretations of the palaeodiet of the Romanian cave bears in comparison with the rest of the European cave bears, is published by Bocherens (2019).
- A study on the cranial and mandibular morphology of Ursus deningeri compared to other bear species, and on its implications for inferring the palaeobiology of this species, is published by van Heteren et al. (2019).
- A study on the tooth-root morphology of maxillary teeth of living bears, and on its implications for inferring the diet and feeding behaviour of the cave bears, is published by Pérez-Ramos et al. (2019).
- A study on the feedings preferences and timing of extinction of cave bears in Mediterranean Europe based on data from two Paleolithic cave bear sites in northeastern Italy (Paina Cave and Trene Cave) is published by Terlato et al. (2019).
- A study on the timing and causes of extinction of cave bears in the Alps is published by Döppes et al. (2019).
- A study on the morphometric and morphotypic variability of upper incisors of the Middle and Late Pleistocene cave bears from the Caucasus and Ural Mountains is published by Baryshnikov, Gimranov & Kosintsev (2019).
- A study on the morphometrical variability of upper cheek teeth of cave bears from 123 geographical sites of Pliocene – Pleistocene ages is published by Baryshnikov & Puzachenko (2019).
- A study evaluating how the morphology of teeth of cave bears from the Scladina Cave (Belgium) changed over time is published by Charters et al. (2019).
- A study on the feeding habits of cave bears from the Toll Cave in Catalonia, as indicated by data from tooth microwear and from stable isotopes extracted from bone collagen, is published by Ramírez-Pedraza et al. (2019).
- A study on the feeding habits of cave bears from six Late Pleistocene caves in Catalonia will be published by Ramírez-Pedraza et al. (2019).
- A study on the timing of the occupation of the Schwabenreith Cave (Austria) by cave bears is published by Spötl et al. (2019).
- A study on the palaeoecology of cave bears from three Late Pleistocene cave bear sites from Romanian Carpathians, based on stable isotope data from their teeth, is published by Robu et al. (2019).
- A study on population dynamics and phylogeography of cave bears during the Late Pleistocene, based on data from reconstructed cave bear mitochondrial genomes, is published by Gretzinger et al. (2019).
- A study on the evolutionary history and paleoecology of brown bears in North-East Siberia, as indicated by mitochondrial DNA and stable isotopic data from subfossil remains from Yakutia (Russia), is published by Rey-Iglesia et al. (2019).
- A study on the morphology and taxonomical status of the Late Pleistocene steppe brown bear is published by Marciszak et al. (2019).
- A study on the evolutionary history of the European brown bears in northern Iberian Peninsula is published by García-Vázquez, Llona & Grandal-d'Anglade (2019), who report evidence indicating that the Pleistocene lineages of the Iberian brown bears were not the direct ancestors of the Holocene ones, and interpret their findings as indicative of the Holocene recolonization of the Iberian Peninsula by brown bears from a cryptic refugium in continental Atlantic Europe.
- A study on the evolutionary history and changes of range and diet of the European brown bears, as indicated by data from mitochondrial DNA from brown bear remains collected from across Europe and ranging in age between the Late Pleistocene and historical times, is published by
- A study on the biomechanical capabilities of the musteloid species Leptarctus primus relative to living carnivoran taxa, and on their implications for inferring the paleoecology of this species, is published by Prybyla, Tseng & Flynn (2019).
- A revision of the systematics of fossil hog-nosed skunks from Argentina will be published by Schiaffini & Juan (2019).
- A skull of a large fossil mustelid showing similarities to both Oriensictis melina from Zhoukoudian and Enhydrictis from Sardinia is described from the Jinyuan cave (Liaoning, China) by Jiangzuo et al. (2019), who relegate Oriensictis to the rank of a subgenus of Enhydrictis.
- Fossil remains of a late Pleistocene European badger are described from Grotta Laceduzza (Apulia, Italy) by Mecozzi et al. (2019), representing the largest sample of this taxon in the European Pleistocene record.
- A study aiming to determine occurrence and timing of shifts in skull shape, body size and body shape in the evolutionary history of mustelids is published by Law (2019).
- A study on the functional morphology of the teeth of Cyonasua and Chapalmalania and on the diet of these taxa, aiming to determine whether these carnivorans may have ecologically overlapped with extinct predatory metatherians from South America, is published by Engelman & Croft (2019).
- A study on feeding strategies used by extinct pinnipeds, as indicated by morphology of their skulls and mandibles, and on the evolution of phocid feeding strategies is published by Kienle & Berta (2019).
- A study aiming to qualitatively and quantitatively characterize the fossil record of pinnipeds from taxonomic, geographical and temporal perspectives is published by Valenzuela-Toro & Pyenson (2019).
- A study on the morphological differences between humeri and femora of different modern phocid taxa, and on their implications for the utility of these limb bones in diagnosing fossil taxa, is published by Churchill & Uhen (2019).
- A study on the bone histology of Nanophoca vitulinoides is published by Dewaele et al. (2019).
- Miocene monk seal teeth are described from the upper Monterey Formation (California, United States) by Velez-Juarbe & Valenzuela-Toro (2019), representing the oldest fossil record of crown phocids from the North Pacific region reported so far.
- A study on the impact of changing sea ice conditions on the diet of the Pacific walrus during the last ~4000 years is published by Clark et al. (2019).
- Description of new dentary material of Percrocuta carnifex from the Nagri Formation (Pakistan), and a study on the occurrence and stratigraphic position of this species within the Sivalik Hills and on the phylogenetic relationships of species assigned to the genus Percrocuta, is published by Ghaffar et al. (2019).
- A study evaluating the ability of the extinct giant fossa to hunt large lemurs is published by Meador et al. (2019).
- Description of mongoose fossils from the early Pleistocene fossil locality Cooper 's D in the Cradle of Humankind (South Africa) is published by Cohen, O'Regan & Steininger (2019).
- A study on the anatomy of the basicranium of Dinocrocuta gigantea is published by Xiong (2019).
- Two isolated teeth of hyenas belonging to the genus Chasmaporthetes are described from the Old Crow Basin (Yukon, Canada) by Tseng, Zazula & Werdelin (2019).
- A study on the upper canine replacement process in sabertooth carnivores belonging to the family Nimravidae is published by Wysocki (2019), who also compares the juvenile morphologies and upper canine replacement processes in the sabertooth lineages of the families Felidae, Barbourofelidae and Nimravidae.
- A study on the brain anatomy of an early Miocene felid known from a skull from Ginn Quarry (Nebraska, United States), representing the oldest known felid specimen in the New World, is published by Lyras, Giannakopoulou & Werdelin (2019).
- A study on a sample of fossils of two species of Machairodus from the early Vallesian site of Los Valles de Fuentidueña (Province of Segovia, Spain), evaluating their implications for the knowledge of palaeoecology of these species, is published by Fernández-Monescillo, Antón & Salesa (2019).
- A study on the anatomy of the neck vertebrae of Machairodus aphanistus, evaluating its implications for the knowledge of the early evolution of adaptations enabling the killing bite of the sabre-toothed cats, is published online by Antón et al. (2019).
- Description of felid fossils recovered from bluffs along the South Saskatchewan River near Medicine Hat (Alberta, Canada), including the first confirmed occurrence of Smilodon fatalis in Canada, is published by Reynolds, Seymour & Evans (2019).
- A study on canines of Smilodon fatalis, aiming to determine whether extreme canine size functioned as a sexually selected signal, is published by O'Brien (2019).
- Two specimens of Smilodon populator with injuries on their skulls are described by Chimento et al. (2019), who interpret these injuries as most likely caused by upper canines of another Smilodon.
- A felid calcaneum is described from the late Pliocene–early Pleistocene Uquía Formation (Argentina) by Ercoli et al. (2019), who assign this specimen to the puma lineage, and interpret it as one of the earliest records of this lineage in America, and of Felidae in South America.
- Tooth enamel strontium isotopic values of a specimen of the American lion from Cedral (San Luis Potosí, Mexico) are determined by Pérez-Crespo et al. (2019), who also evaluate the implications of their findings for inferring the mobility of the studied specimen.
- The first fossil tiger specimen from the Kyushu area (Japan) is reported by Hasegawa et al. (2019).

=== Chiroptera ===
Name	Novelty	Status	Authors	Age	Type locality	Country	Notes	Images
Barbastella maxima	Sp. nov	Valid	Rosina, Kruskop & Semenov	Late Miocene		Ukraine	A species of Barbastella	
Koopmanycteris	Gen. et sp. nov	Valid	Morgan, Czaplewski & Simmons	Oligocene		United States (Florida)	A member of the family Mormoopidae. The type species is K. palaeomormoops.	
Myotis gerhardstorchi	Sp. nov	Valid	Horáček & Trávníčková	Early Pliocene		Hungary	A mouse-eared bat	
Quinetia frigidaria	Sp. nov	Valid	Czaplewski et al.	Whitneyan	Brule Formation	United States (North Dakota)	A member of the family Vespertilionidae	

==== Chiropteran research ====
- A study on the completeness of the bat fossil record is published by Brown et al. (2019).
- A study on aerodynamic features of Onychonycteris finneyi is published by Amador, Simmons & Giannini (2019).
- Description of Pleistocene and Holocene bat fossils from the Grotta dei Pipistrelli (Sicily, Italy) is published by Salari et al. (2019).

=== Notoungulates ===
Name	Novelty	Status	Authors	Age	Type locality	Country	Notes	Images
Hemihegetotherium tantillum	Sp. nov	Valid	Vera	Miocene	Collón Curá	Argentina	A hegetotheriid notoungulate	
Orome	Gen. et sp. nov	Valid	Bauzá, Gelfo & López	Eocene (Ypresian)	Las Flores	Argentina	A henricosborniid notoungulate. The type species is O. deepi.	
Protypotherium concepcionensis	Sp. nov	Valid	Solórzano et al.	Miocene	Cura-Mallín	Chile	An interatheriid notoungulate	

==== Notoungulate research ====
- A study on variations of incisor enamel microstructure in notoungulates and on their evolutionary and ecological significance is published online by Filippo et al. (2019).
- First skeletal remains of Notostylops murinus recovered from middle Eocene levels of the Sarmiento Formation (Argentina) are described by Lorente, Gelfo & López (2019).
- New fossil specimen of Pampahippus secundus is described from the Eocene Upper Lumbrera Formation (Argentina) by García-López et al. (2019).
- A study on the anatomy and phylogenetic relationships of Notohippus toxodontoides, as indicated by data from specimens from the Río Bote locality in the early Miocene Santa Cruz Formation (Argentina), is published by Del Pino et al. (2019).
- A systematic revision of the genus Patriarchus and a study on the phylogenetic relationships of this genus within the Interatheriidae is published by Fernández, Fernicola & Cerdeño (2019).
- A study on the braincase anatomy in mesotheriid notoungulates is published by Fernández-Monescillo et al. (2019).
- Partial skeleton of Plesiotypotherium achirense showing multiple skeletal and dental pathologies is described from the late Miocene locality of Achiri (Bolivian Altiplano) by Fernández-Monescillo et al. (2019).
- A revision and a study on the phylogenetic relationships of the Friasian and Mayoan interatheriine interatheriid notoungulates from southern Argentina and Chile is published by Vera et al. (2019).
- A systematic re-evaluation of hegetotheriid notoungulates belonging to the genera Hegetotherium and Pachyrukhos is published by Seoane & Cerdeño (2019).
- A revision of the fossil material assigned to the genera Propachyrucos and Prosotherium is published by Seoane, Cerdeño & Singleton (2019).
- Detailed reconstruction of the masticatory muscles of Paedotherium and Tremacyllus is presented by Ercoli, Álvarez & Candela (2019), who report the presence of a true sciuromorph condition convergent with the condition evolved by rodents.
- A study on the anatomy of limbs of the toxodont Isotemnus is published online by Lorente (2019).

=== Perissodactyla ===
Name	Novelty	Status	Authors	Age	Type locality	Country	Notes	Images
"Ceratotherium" advenientis	Sp. nov	Valid	Pandolfi et al.	Late Miocene		Italy	A rhinoceros. Announced in 2019; the final article version was published in 2021.	
Chowliia europea	Sp. nov	Valid	Bronnert et al.	Early Eocene		France	An "isectolophid"	
Irenolophus	Gen. et sp. et comb. nov	valid	Bai et al.	Eocene	Arshanto Formation	China	A Deperetellidae Tapiroidean. The type species is I. qii; genus also includes "Teleolophus" primarius Qi (1987).	
Pachynolophus ruscassierensis	Sp. nov	Valid	Remy et al.	Eocene		France	A palaeotheriid	
Plesiaceratherium balkanicum	Sp. nov	Valid	Becker & Tissier	Miocene (MN5)	Bugojno Basin	Bosnia and Herzegovina		
Teleoceras aepysoma	Sp. nov	Valid	Short, Wallace & Emmert	Latest Hemphillian	Gray Fossil Site	United States (Tennessee)		

==== Perissodactyl research ====
- A study on the anatomy of the skeleton of extant tapirs and endemic Eocene European odd-toed ungulates, aiming to determine whether tapirs represent viable analogues for locomotion in palaeotheres and lophiodontids, is published online by MacLaren & Nauwelaerts (2019).
- A study on the diet and habitat of Schlosseria magister and Lophialetes expeditus is published online by Gong et al. (2019).
- A study on the intraspecific variation of the skeletal anatomy in the lophiodontid species Eolophiodon laboriense is published by Vautrin et al. (2019).
- A study on the morphology of the nares of the brontotheres Metarhinus and Sphenocoelus, and on their functional significance, is published by Mader (2019).
- A revision of the fossil material of rhinocerotids from the Miocene (Agenian) of Wischberg (Switzerland) is published by Jame et al. (2019).
- A study on the abundance of members of the genera Aphelops and Teleoceras from the middle Miocene to the Pliocene of the Great Plains, and on possible causes of their extinction, is published online by Wang & Secord (2019).
- A study on the phylogenetic relationships of the Eurasian rhinocerotids of the Pleistocene epoch, based on data from the proteome from enamel of a tooth of a member of the genus Stephanorhinus from the Dmanisi site (Georgia), is published by Cappellini et al. (2019).
- A study on the timing of extinction of Elasmotherium sibiricum will be published by Kosintsev et al. (2019), who report evidence indicating that this species survived in Eastern Europe and Central Asia until at least 39,000 years ago.
- A study on cheek teeth and mandibular remains of a middle Pleistocene rhinoceros from the Matsugae Cave (Japan), previously identified as belonging to a member of the genus Dicerorhinus, is published online by Handa, Kohno & Kudo (2019), who reinterpret this fossil material as belonging to a member of the genus Stephanorhinus.
- A study on efficiency of the different modes of mastication, changes in the different masticatory paths and probable diets of early members of Equoidea is published by Engels & Schultz (2019).
- A study on the daily and seasonal movements of equids from two Miocene fossil sites in northern Florida, as indicated by data from strontium isotope ratios in tooth enamel, will be published by Wallace, Crowley & Miller (2019).
- A study on the life history of Miocene hipparionins, as indicated by teeth histology, is published by Orlandi-Oliveras, Nacarino-Meneses & Köhler (2019).
- Description of new fossil material of hipparions from the Miocene locality Ravin des Zouaves-5 (Greece), and a study on the taxonomy and phylogenetic relationships of these equids, is published by Koufos & Vlachou (2019).
- Limb bones fossils referred to Hipparion (Hippotherium) chiai are described from the Miocene of the middle reaches of the Yellow River (Shaanxi, China) by Li et al. (2019), who evaluate the implications of these fossils for the knowledge of the locomotor abilities of H. chiai and the environment inhabited by members of this species.
- Fossils of members of the genus Eurygnathohippus of uncertain specific assignment are described from the late Pliocene sediments of the Potwar Plateau in Pakistan and the Siwalik Hills in northwest India by Jukar et al. (2019), representing the first occurrence of members of this genus outside Africa reported so far.
- Revision and a study on variability of fossils of Dinohippus mexicanus from the Hemphillian localities in central Mexico is published by Carranza-Castañeda (2019).
- A review of the evolutionary history of equid locomotor morphology, attempting to explain why the monodactyly evolved only in the lineage leading to modern equids, is published by Janis & Bernor (2019).
- A study assessing the evidence for different hypotheses explaining how and why monodactyly evolved in equids is published by McHorse, Biewener & Pierce (2019).
- A study on the functions of hypsodonty of the tooth crowns in equids, as indicated by data from extant and fossil equids, is published by Solounias et al. (2019).
- A review of biochronologic evidence which is the basis of recognizing Land Mammal Ages across different continents, evaluating is implications for the knowledge of the major equid evolutionary events for the last 8 million years, is published by Rook et al. (2019).
- Description of Pleistocene equid fossils from Cooper's D locality (Cooper's Cave, South Africa) is published by Badenhorst & Steininger (2019).
- A study on DNA extracted from Pleistocene equid fossils from Kunni River bed at Taiping village (Heilongjiang, China) is published by Yuan et al. (2019), who report evidence of presence of Equus ovodovi in China.
- A study on teeth of Pleistocene equids from the Anagni Basin (central Italy) and on their implications for the knowledge of the niche occupation and resource exploitation mechanisms of these equids is published by Strani et al. (2019).
- A study on the diversity and evolution of members of the genus Equus in North America, Asia, Europe, and Africa, and on its implications for the knowledge origin and evolution of ancient and living zebras, is published by Bernor et al. (2019).
- An overview of research advances from the preceding years concerning the biostratigraphy and palaeoecology of the genus Equus in Europe is published by Boulbes & van Asperen (2019).
- A review and a study on the evolutionary history of early members of the genus Equus from China is published by Sun & Deng (2019).
- A study on the diversity of native South American members of the genus Equus is published by Machado & Avilla (2019).
- A study on the potential range of distribution of South American horses during the transition from the Last Glacial Maximum to the Holocene, and on its implications for the knowledge of the causes of the Late Quaternary extinction of South American horses, is published by Villavicencio, Corcoran & Marquet (2019).
- A review of the Neogene fossil record of members of Equinae from Mexico is published by Bravo-Cuevas & Jiménez-Hidalgo (2019).
- A study on the diversity and paleoecology of late Pleistocene horses from northwestern and central Oaxaca and central Chiapas (Mexico) is published by Jiménez-Hidalgo et al. (2019).
- A study on the metapodial bone histology of Equus mosbachensis and Equus steinheimensis, and on its implications for the knowledge of the life history of these species, is published online by Nacarino-Meneses & Orlandi-Oliveras (2019).
- A study on the evolutionary history of domestic horses, based on DNA data from horse subfossils with ages mostly spanning the last six millennia, is published by Fages et al. (2019), who present evidence of existence of two extinct horse lineages in Iberia and Siberia during early domestication.
- A review of the use of the generic name Equus within different phylogenetic frameworks and a study on the phylogenetic relationships of derived members of Equini is published by Barrón-Ortiz et al. (2019).

== Xenarthrans ==
=== Cingulata ===
Name	Novelty	Status	Authors	Age	Type locality	Country	Notes	Images
Holmesina cryptae	Sp. nov	Valid	Moura et al.	Late Pleistocene (Lujanian)		Brazil		

==== Cingulatan research ====
- A study on the evolution of morphological traits associated with tail weaponry in glyptodonts and ankylosaur dinosaurs, aiming to quantitatively test the hypothesis that tail weaponry of these groups is an example of convergent evolution, is published online by Arbour & Zanno (2019).
- New fossil material of the glyptodont Neuryurus, including associated remains of carapace and endoskeletal bones, is described from the Pleistocene Sopas Formation (Uruguay) by Perea, Toriño & Ghizzoni (2019).
- A review of the late Pleistocene species of Glyptodon from southern South America is published by Cuadrelli et al. (2019).
- New specimen of Pucatherium parvum is described from the Eocene of the Lumbrera Formation (Argentina) by Herrera et al. (2019).
- A study on the impact of climate changes on the distribution of armadillos as indicated by fossil record is published by Soibelzon (2019).
- A study on the internal structure of the osteoderms of extinct armadillos, and on its possible associations with the climate and environmental conditions of the distribution areas of various armadillo species, is published by Ciancio et al. (2019).

=== Pilosa ===
Name	Novelty	Status	Authors	Age	Type locality	Country	Notes	Images
Archaeomylodon	Gen. et sp. nov	Valid	Brambilla & Ibarra	Ensenadan		Argentina	A member of the family Mylodontidae belonging to the subfamily Mylodontinae. Genus includes new species A. sampedrinensis.	
Glossotherium phoenesis	Sp. nov	Valid	Cartelle et al.	Late Pleistocene		Brazil		

==== Pilosan research ====
- A study on the phylogeny, macroevolution, and historical biogeography of sloths is published by Varela et al. (2019).
- A study on the phylogenetic relationships and evolutionary history of extinct and living sloths, as indicated by data from extinct sloth mitogenomes, is published by Delsuc et al. (2019).
- A study on the phylogenetic relationships of tree sloths and their extinct relatives, as indicated by collagen sequence information and mitochondrial DNA evidence, is published by Presslee et al. (2019).
- A study on the musculoskeletal diseases of Pleistocene sloths from the Brazilian Intertropical Region is published by Barbosa et al. (2019).
- A study comparing the ungual phalanges of the third finger from the manus of Pleistocene ground sloths and a wide range of extant mammals, and aiming to determine possible life habits of Pleistocene ground sloths, is published online by Patiño, Zerpa & Fariña (2019).
- A study on the phylogenetic relationships and evolutionary history of members of the family Mylodontidae is published by Boscaini, Pujos & Gaudin (2019).
- New skull and teeth remains of Simomylodon uccasamamensis are described from the latest Miocene–Pliocene of the Bolivian Altiplano by Boscaini et al. (2019).
- A study on the skeletal morphology of Simomylodon uccasamamensis is published by Boscaini et al. (2019), who report evidence indicative of sexual dimorphism.
- New specimen of Lestodon armatus, providing new information on the anatomy of this species, is described from a Quaternary deposit in Caçapava do Sul (Brazil) by Vargas-Peixoto et al. (2019).
- New fossil remains of Proscelidodon rothi are described from the Pliocene El Polvorín Formation (Buenos Aires Province, Argentina) by Miño-Boilini et al. (2019).
- Partial specimen of Megalonyx jeffersonii is described from a peat deposit near Newburgh, Orange County by McDonald, Feranec & Miller (2019), representing the first record of this species from New York reported so far.
- A study on sexual dimorphism and geographic variation of fossil megalonychid sloths from Hispaniola is published online by McAfee & Beery (2019).
- New fossil specimens belonging to the genus Neocnus, representing the easternmost record of this genus reported so far, are described from the Upper Pleistocene localities of Padre Nuestro and Oleg's Bat House (Dominican Republic) by McAfee & Rimoli (2019).
- Description of a partial dentary with teeth and an astragalus of Megathericulus patagonicus from the Miocene Collón Curá Formation (Argentina) is published online by Brandoni, Ruiz & Bucher (2019), who consider the species Megathericulus primaevus to be a junior synonym of M. patagonicus.
- Description of new fossil material of Thalassocnus from the Mina Fosforita member of the Bahía Inglesa Formation (Chile) and a study on the taxonomic diversity of members of the genus Thalassocnus in Chile is published by Peralta-Prato & Solórzano (2019).
- Description of new fossil material of Nothrotheriops from the late Pleistocene of the Esperanza Lithostratigraphic Unit from the Salado Fluvial Accumulation Depression (Santa Fe Province, Argentina), and a study on the implications of this finding for the knowledge of the dispersal of ground sloths during the Great American Interchange, is published by Brandoni & Vezzosi (2019).
- A study on the paleoecology of the first fossilized specimen of Eremotherium laurillardi from Belize, as indicated by stable isotope analysis, is published by Larmon et al. (2019).
- Description of fossils of Megatherium americanum from the Pleistocene deposits of the Coastal Plain of the State of Rio Grande do Sul (Brazil) is published by Lopes & Pereira (2019).
- A study on the morphology of the scapulae of juvenile and adult specimens of Megalonyx jeffersonii and Paramylodon harlani, and on its implications of the knowledge of the behavior of these sloths, is published by Grass (2019).

=== General xenarthran research ===
- A study on the anatomy of the bone elements of the hyoid apparatus of xenarthrans, and on its implications for the knowledge of the phylogenetic relationships of xenarthrans, is published by Zamorano (2019).

== Other eutherians ==
Name	Novelty	Status	Authors	Age	Type locality	Country	Notes	Images
Astrapotherium guillei	Sp. nov	Valid	Kramarz, Garrido & Bond	Middle Miocene	Collón Curá	Argentina	A new species of Astrapotherium	
Cartierodon	Gen. et sp. nov	Valid	Solé & Mennecart	Eocene (Lutetian)		France; Switzerland	A member of Hyaenodonta belonging to the family Hyaenodontidae. The type species is C. egerkingensis.	
Enantiostylops	Gen. et comb. nov	Valid	Averianov	Early Eocene		China	A member of Arctostylopida; a new genus for "Sinostylops" progressus Tang & Yan (1976)	
Fratrodon	Gen. et sp. nov	Valid	Solé et al.	Eocene (Ypresian)	Paris	France	A member of the family Paroxyclaenidae. Genus includes new species F. tresvauxi.	
Hyaenodon pumilus	Sp. nov	Valid	Lavrov	Late Eocene		Mongolia		
Lophocion grangeri	Sp. nov	Valid	Bai, Wang & Meng	Late Paleocene	Clark's Fork	United States (Wyoming)	A member of the family Phenacodontidae. Announced in 2019; the final version of the article naming it was published in 2021.	
Merialus bruneti	Sp. nov	Valid	Solé et al.	Eocene (Ypresian)	Paris	France	A member of the family Paroxyclaenidae	
Nesophontes hemicingulus	Sp. nov	Valid	Morgan et al.	Late Pleistocene-Holocene		Cayman Islands	A species of Nesophontes	
Oligoechinus	Gen. et sp. nov	Valid	Li et al.	Late Oligocene	Lanzhou Basin	China	A member of the family Erinaceidae. Genus includes new species O. lanzhouensis.	
Pahelia	Gen. et sp. nov	Valid	Zack et al.	Early Eocene	Cambay	India	An ungulate-like herbivorous mammal. Genus includes new species P. mysteriosa.	
Paraspaniella	Gen. et sp. nov	Valid	Solé et al.	Eocene (Ypresian)	Paris	France	A member of the family Paroxyclaenidae. Genus includes new species P. gunnelli.	
Propterodon witteri	Sp. nov	Valid	Zack	late Uintan	Uinta Formation	United States (Utah)	A member of the family Hyaenodontidae	
Saltaodus	Gen. et sp. nov	Valid	Gelfo et al.	Eocene	Lumbrera	Argentina	A native South American ungulate belonging to the family Didolodontidae. Genus includes new species S. sirolli. Announced in 2019; the final version of the article naming it was published in 2020.	
Simbakubwa	Gen. et sp. nov	Valid	Borths & Stevens	Early Miocene		Kenya	A member of Hyaenodonta belonging to the group Hyainailouroidea and to the subfamily Hyainailourinae. The type species is S. kutokaafrika.	
Sororodon	Gen. et sp. nov	Valid	Solé et al.	Eocene (Ypresian)	Paris	France	A member of the family Paroxyclaenidae. Genus includes new species S. tresvauxae.	
Uruguayodon	Gen. et sp. nov	Valid	Corona, Perea & Ubilla	Pleistocene		Uruguay	A member of Litopterna belonging to the subfamily Proterotheriinae. Genus includes new species U. alius.	

=== Other eutherian research ===
- A study on the phylogenetic relationships of extant and fossil moles belonging to the tribe Scalopini is published by Schwermann et al. (2019).
- A study on early Miocene fossils of members of the families Soricidae and Heterosoricidae from the Ribesalbes-Alcora Basin (Spain) is published by Crespo et al. (2019).
- A study on the anatomy of tarsals of Batodonoides powayensis, and on its implications for the knowledge of the phylogenetic relationships of the family Geolabididae, is published by Zack & Penkrot (2019).
- Description of the brain, inner ear, sinuses and endocranial nerves and vessels of the periptychid Carsioptychus coarctatus is published by Cameron et al. (2019).
- Virtual endocasts of endocranium and inner ear of Chriacus pelvidens and Chriacus baldwini are reconstructed by Bertrand et al. (2019).
- Description of new fossil material of Molinodus suarezi, Simoclaenus sylvaticus, Tiuclaenus minutus, Tiuclaenus robustus and Pucanodus gagnieri from the Paleocene of the Tiupampa locality (Bolivia), providing new information on the anatomy of skulls and teeth of these taxa, is published by de Muizon, Billet & Ladevèze (2019).
- New astrapothere fossils from the Eocene Cañadón Vaca Member of the Sarmiento Formation (Argentina), providing new information the early diversification of this group, are described by Kramarz, Bond & Carlini (2019).
- Redescription of Protolipterna ellipsodontoides and a study on the teeth variation between members of this species is published by Zanesco, Bergqvist & Pereira (2019).
- Description of litopterns from the early Miocene Pampa Castillo fauna (Galera Formation, Chile) and a study on the phylogenetic relationships of proterotheriids is published online by McGrath, Flynn & Wyss (2019).
- Description of new cranial remains of the proterotheriid Neolicaphrium recens from the Pleistocene Sopas Formation (Uruguay), and a study on the diet of this species as indicated by tooth microwear, is published by Corona, Ubilla & Perea (2019).
- A study on the dietary and environmental preferences of Neolicaphrium recens is published by Morosi & Ubilla (2019).
- New proterotheriid and macraucheniid fossil material is described from the late Oligocene Quebrada Fiera locality (Mendoza Province, Argentina) by Schmidt, Cerdeño & Del Pino (2019), extending the geographical range of Coniopternium, and including the first Argentinian record of Lambdaconus outside Patagonia.
- Left dentary of a member of the genus Harpagolestes belonging or related to the species H. uintensis is described from the Eocene Clarno Formation (Oregon, United States) by Robson et al. (2019), representing the first mesonychid from this formation reported so far.
- A study on the phylogenetic relationships of desmostylians is published by Matsui & Tsuihiji (2019).
- New fossil material of Pantolestes is described from the Uinta Basin (Utah, United States) by Dunn & Townsend (2019), who also revise species-level diversity of Pantolestes from the Bridgerian and Uintan North American land mammal ages.
- A study comparing the teeth of Prionogale to the teeth of subadult hyaenodonts and carnivorans, as well as evaluating the phylogenetic affinities of Prionogale and Namasector within Hyaenodonta, is published by Borths & Stevens (2019), who reinterpret the type specimen of Prionogale breviceps and some of the paratype materials as preserving deciduous teeth which were previously interpreted as permanent dentition.
- A reconstruction of the endocast of Proviverra typica based on X-ray microtomography is presented by Dubied, Solé & Mennecart (2019), who also study the phylogenetic relationships of hyaenodonts.
- Description of a partial skeleton of a medium-sized carnivorous mammal (classified as a machaeroidine oxyaenid) from the Uinta Formation (Utah, United States) and a study on machaeroidine locomotor habits and on phylogenetic affinities of machaeroidines and "creodonts" in general is published by Zack (2019).
- Description of rabbit fossils from the Late Miocene Shuitangba site (Zhaotong Basin; Yunnan, China), assigned to the extant genus Nesolagus, and a study on their implications for the knowledge of the evolutionary history of this genus and paleoecology of the site, is published by Flynn et al. (2019).
- A study on the size of fossil rabbits from 14 late Pleistocene and Holocene archaeological sites in Portugal, and on its implications for the knowledge of temperatures and environment in the area of Portugal during the last glaciation, is published by Davis (2019).
- Description of the anatomy of a partial skeleton and a dentary with anterior teeth of the plesiadapiform Torrejonia wilsoni from the lower Paleocene Nacimiento Formation (New Mexico, United States) is published by Chester et al. (2019).
- A study on the anatomy, life history and phylogenetic relationships of Plesiadapis cookei is published by Boyer & Gingerich (2019).

== General eutherian research ==
- A study on the relationship between morphological and molecular rates of evolution of placental mammals is published by Halliday et al. (2019), who interpret their findings as supporting a Late Cretaceous origin of crown placentals, and indicating that early members of major placental groups may not be easily distinguishable from one another or from stem eutherians.
- A study on the phylogenetic distribution, morphological variation and functions of apicobasal ridges (elevated ridges of tooth enamel) in aquatic mammals and reptiles, as indicated by data from extant and fossil taxa, is published by McCurry et al. (2019).
- New late Rupelian mammal fossils, including new specimens of the shrew Srinitium marteli and fossils of taxa formerly unknown in this locality, are described from the Aubenas-les-Alpes locality (France) by Maridet, Hugueney & Costeur (2019).
- A study on the brain size of extinct insular dwarf species of hippos and elephants is published by Lyras (2019).
- A study on the relative contributions of grass and grit as a driving force of evolutionary changes in teeth of North American ungulates is published by Semprebon, Rivals & Janis (2019).
- A study on fossils of Micromeryx flourensianus from a Miocene locality in France, preserving signs of carnivore activity, and on the possible identity of the predator which produced marks on these bones, is published by Aiglstorfer, Heizmann & Peigné (2019).
- A study on changes in local climate and habitat conditions in central Spain in a period from 9.1 to 6.3 million years ago, and on the diet and ecology of large mammals from this area in this time period as indicated by tooth wear patterns, is published by De Miguel, Azanza & Morales (2019).
- Miocene (Turolian) mammal faunas from several fossiliferous localities at Gorna Sushitsa (southwestern Bulgaria) are described by Spassov et al. (2019).
- New late Miocene vertebrate assemblage, including turtle, rodent and xenarthran fossils (among which is the oldest record of an armadillo belonging to the genus Dasypus reported so far), is described from the Los Alisos locality (Guanaco Formation, Argentina) by Ercoli et al. (2019).
- A study on modern and fossil mammal herbivore communities from eastern Africa spanning the last ~7 million years, aiming to determine whether modern herbivore communities are suitable analogs for the ancient ecosystems in which early hominins evolved, is published by Faith, Rowan & Du (2019).
- A study on the anatomical traits of teeth and inferred diet of bovids, suids and rhinocerotids from the Pliocene site of Kanapoi (Kenya), and on their implications for reconstructing the environments of this site, is published online by Dumouchel & Bobe (2019).
- A study on the mortality profiles of bovids from the Oldowan localities in Kanjera South (Kenya) and Olduvai Gorge (Tanzania), and on their implications for inferring hunting and scavenging behavior of early hominins in different (i.e. grassland and woodland) habitats, is published by Oliver et al. (2019).
- A study on spatial and temporal variation in species composition of ungulates from the Koobi Fora Formation throughout the Early Pleistocene is published online by O'Brien et al. (2019).
- Results of stable carbon and oxygen isotope analyses of tooth enamel samples from Pleistocene mammals from the Yugong Cave and Baxian Cave (China) are presented by Sun et al. (2019), who evaluate the implications of their findings for the knowledge of Pleistocene climatic and environmental changes in South China.
- A study on the affinities and ages of Pleistocene mammalian faunas from China is published online by Dong, Liu & Bai (2019).
- A study on Pleistocene mammal fossils from the Yai Ruak Cave (Krabi Province, Thailand), including the southernmost known record of Crocuta crocuta ultima in Southeast Asia, is published by Suraprasit et al. (2019), who evaluate the implications of these fossils for reconstructions of the environment in the area of the Malay Peninsula in the Pleistocene.
- A study on Paleolithic faunal remains from the Manot Cave (Israel), comparing human and hyena prey choice in the Upper Paleolithic Galilee, is published online by Orbach & Yeshurun (2019).
- A study on Pleistocene small mammal remains from Stratigraphic Unit V from El Salt site (Alcoy, Spain), evaluating their implications for the knowledge of climatic conditions in the eastern Iberian Peninsula at the time of the disappearance of local Neanderthal populations during Marine Isotope Stage 3, is published by Fagoaga et al. (2019).
- A study on leporid assemblages from 8 sites in southern France associated with Acheulean and Middle Paleolithic occupations by hominins, aiming to examine small fast game exploitation by archaic Homo populations, is published by Morin et al. (2019).
- A study on the taxonomic and skeletal identification and on surface modifications of mammals bones from the Fumane cave (Italy), evaluating their implications for the knowledge of subsistence behaviour of hominins inhabiting the cave across the Middle to Upper Paleolithic transition, is published by Sinet-Mathiot et al. (2019).
- A study on the dietary patterns and the ecological niches occupied by ungulates from the Mousterian of the Covalejos Cave (Cantabria, Spain), as inferred from analyses of teeth wear and dental cementum, is published by Sánchez-Hernández et al. (2019), who evaluate the implications of their findings for the knowledge of the environmental conditions of this region, the knowledge of the age and season at the time of death these ungulates, and the knowledge of the seasonality and duration of Neanderthal occupations of the Covalejos Cave and the seasonality of their hunting activities.
- A study on animal remains from the El Cierro cave (Asturias, Spain), evaluating how much energy red deer supplied to the diet of the humans that inhabited El Cierro during the Lower Magdalenian in comparison with other animals, is published by Portero et al. (2019).
- A study on movement patterns of the Columbian mammoths and other herbivores from the Waco Mammoth National Monument site (Texas, United States), based on strontium isotope data from their teeth, is published by Esker et al. (2019).
- Description of Pleistocene mammal fossils from Extinction Cave (Belize), including one of the southernmost record of the bison and one of two records of the bear species Tremarctos floridanus from Central America, is published online by Churcher (2019).
- A revision and a study on the age of the Late Pleistocene megafauna of Guatemala is published by Dávila et al. (2019).
- Evidence from the Campo Laborde site in Argentina indicating that humans hunted and butchered a giant ground sloth Megatherium americanum is presented by Politis et al. (2019).
- A study on diet and niche width of late Quaternary large herbivorous mammals from the Brazilian Intertropical Region is published by Pansani et al. (2019).
- A study on late Pleistocene mammal fossils recovered from a tank deposit in Lagoa de Pedra (Anagé municipality, Bahia State, Brazil), aiming to determine the diet of these mammals and the paleoenvironment they lived in, is published by da Silva et al. (2019).
- A study on late Quaternary mammal remains from the Upper Gunnison Basin (Colorado, United States), focusing on their implications for the knowledge of impact of climate changes since the Last Glacial Maximum on small mammals from this area, is published by Emslie & Meltzer (2019).
- A study on the ecology of mammals from the La Brea Tar Pits, focusing on the dietary responses of carnivorans to changing climate and megafaunal extinctions at the end of the Pleistocene, is published by DeSantis et al. (2019).
- A study on possible causes of the late Pleistocene extinctions, as indicated by the analysis of tooth wear and enamel hypoplasia in late Pleistocene horses and bisons from North America, is published by Barrón-Ortiz et al. (2019).
- A study aiming to identify community assembly effects of the end-Pleistocene extinctions of large mammals in North America is published by Tóth et al. (2019).
- A study on the role of past climate, extinct megafauna and guanaco in shaping the vegetation of the Patagonian steppe is published by Hernández, Ríos & Perotto-Baldivieso (2019).
- A study on the impact of climate change on the faunal composition and extinction dynamics of European mammal species during the Late Pleistocene-Holocene transition, aiming to test the hypothesis of the existence of common evolutionary processes of change in faunal composition during the Late Pleistocene and Holocene, independent of the regions of Europe, is published by Puzachenko & Markova (2019).
- A study on population density of large herbivores in Europe during the late Pleistocene and early Holocene, reconstructed on the basis of data from fossil dung fungus spores from central Latvia, is published by Stivrins et al. (2019).
- The discovery of ancient bear, roe deer and bat DNA recovered from stalagmites from the Solkota cave (Georgia) is reported by Stahlschmidt et al. (2019).
- A study on evolutionary changes in body size and sexual size dimorphism associated with the independent colonization of Madagascar by primates, carnivorans, tenrecs and rodents is published by Kappeler et al. (2019).
- A study aiming to evaluate whether introduced deer and hares fill the same ecological niches as extinct moa birds in New Zealand, as indicated by data from pollen extracted from moa coprolites and mammal feces, is published by Wood & Wilmshurst (2019).
- Description of small mammal fossils from the Pliocene site of Kanapoi (Kenya) is published online by Manthi & Winkler (2019).

== Metatherians ==
Name	Novelty	Status	Authors	Age	Type locality	Country	Notes	Images
Apeirodon	Gen. et sp. nov	Valid	Babot et al.	Eocene (Priabonian)	Geste Formation	Argentina	A small bunodont metatherian, possibly an early divergent member of Polydolopimorphia. The type species is A. sorianoi. Announced in 2019; the final article version was published in 2020.	
Chaeropus yirratji	Sp. nov	Valid	Travouillon et al.	Holocene		Australia	A relative of the pig-footed bandicoot	
Patene coloradensis	Sp. nov	Valid	Rangel et al.	Middle Eocene	Quebrada de Los Colorados Formation	Argentina	A sparassodont	
Unnuakomys	Gen. et sp. nov	Valid	Eberle et al.	Late Cretaceous (Maastrichtian)	Prince Creek Formation	United States (Alaska)	A member of the family Pediomyidae. Genus includes new species U. hutchisoni.	Unnuakomys (lower left)

=== Metatherian research ===
- Description of the anatomy of the postcranial skeleton of Argyrolagus scaglai from the Pliocene of Argentina is published online by Abello & Candela (2019), who interpret this species as having bipedal jumping locomotion.
- Description of the anatomy of the caudal part of the cranium of Thylacosmilus atrox is published by Forasiepi, Macphee & del Pino (2019).
- Description of a nearly complete juvenile skull of Sparassocynus derivatus from the Pliocene Chapadmalal Formation (Argentina) and a study on the phylogenetic relationships of "sparassocynids" is published online by Beck & Taglioretti (2019).
- A study on the locomotion of balbarids is published by Den Boer, Campione & Kear (2019).
- A study on the phylogenetic relationships of a giant short-faced kangaroo Simosthenurus occidentalis and giant wallaby Protemnodon anak, as indicated by data from fossils and near-complete mitochondrial genomes, is published by Cascini et al. (2019).
- A study on the skull morphology of Simosthenurus occidentalis, and on its implications for inferring the diet of this mammal, is published by Mitchell & Wroe (2019).
- A study on the skull of Simosthenurus occidentalis, evaluating whether it was capable of consuming tough vegetation and withstanding twisting forces while biting resistant objects, is published by Mitchell (2019).
- The first descriptions of the appendicular skeleton and body mass estimates for three palorchestid species (Palorchestes azael, Palorchestes parvus and a member of the genus Propalorchestes of uncertain specific assignment from the Bullock Creek Fossil Site) are presented by Richards et al. (2019).
- A study on fossils of a putative Cretaceous dicynodont from Australia reported by Thulborn & Turner (2003) is published online by Knutsen & Oerlemans (2019), who consider these fossils to be of Pliocene-Pleistocene age, and reinterpret it as fossils of a large mammal, probably a diprotodontid.
- A study on the range and ecological tolerances of the Tasmanian devil living in the mainland Australia in prehistoric times, and on its implications for the viability of the proposal to reintroduce Tasmanian devils to mainland Australia, is published by Westaway et al. (2019).
- A study on the pre-Pleistocene evolutionary history of the family Thylacinidae is published by Rovinsky, Evans & Adams (2019).
- An atlas of the skeletal elements of the thylacine is published by Warburton, Travouillon & Camens (2019).

== Other mammals ==
Name	Novelty	Status	Authors	Age	Type locality	Country	Notes	Images
Cimbriodon	Gen. et sp. nov	Valid	Martin et al.	Late Jurassic (Kimmeridgian)	Süntel	Germany	A multituberculate. Genus includes new species C. multituberculatus.	
Cimolodon akersteni	Sp. nov	Valid	Weaver et al.	Late Cretaceous (Cenomanian)	Wayan	United States (Idaho)	A multituberculate	
Dolichoprion	Gen. et sp. nov	Valid	Kusuhashi, Wang & Jin	Early Cretaceous	Fuxin	China	An eobaatarid multituberculate. Genus includes new species D. lii. Announced in 2019; the final version of the article naming it was published in 2020.	
Fuxinoconodon	Gen. et sp. nov	Valid	Kusuhashi et al.	Early Cretaceous (Aptian–Albian)	Fuxin	China	A member of the family Gobiconodontidae. The type species is F. changi. Announced in 2019; the final version of the article naming it was published in 2020.	
Galulatherium	Gen. et sp. nov	Valid	O'Connor et al.	Late Cretaceous (Turonian–Campanian)	Galula	Tanzania	Possibly a member of Gondwanatheria and the family Sudamericidae. The type species is G. jenkinsi.	
Guibaatar	Gen. et sp. nov	Valid	Wible, Shelley & Bi	Late Cretaceous (Campanian)	Bayan Mandahu	China	A djadochtatheriid multituberculate. The type species is G. castellanus.	
Jeholbaatar	Gen. et sp. nov	Valid	Wang, Meng & Wang	Early Cretaceous (Aptian)	Jiufotang	China	An eobaatarid multituberculate. Genus includes new species J. kielanae.	
Maiopatagium sibiricum	Sp. nov	Valid	Averianov et al.	Middle Jurassic	Itat	Russia	A member of Euharamiyida	
Microdocodon	Gen. et sp. nov	Valid	Zhou et al.	Middle Jurassic	Daohugou	China	A member of Docodonta. Genus includes new species M. gracilis.	
Origolestes	Gen. et sp. nov		Mao et al.	Early Cretaceous (Aptian)	Yixian	China	A member of the family Zhangheotheriidae. Genus includes new species O. lii. Announced in 2019; the final version of the article naming it was published in 2020.	
Qishou	Gen. et sp. nov	Valid	Mao & Meng	Late Jurassic (Oxfordian)	Tiaojishan	China	A member of Euharamiyida. Genus includes new species Q. jizantang.	
Sharypovoia	Gen. et 2 sp. nov	Valid	Averianov et al.	Middle Jurassic	Itat	Russia	A member of Euharamiyida belonging to the family Shenshouidae. Genus includes new species S. arimasporum and S. magna.	
Storchodon	Gen. et sp. nov	Valid	Martin et al.	Late Jurassic (Kimmeridgian)	Süntel	Germany	A member of Morganucodonta. The type species is S. cingulatus.	

=== Miscellaneous mammaliformes research ===
- A study on occlusion and function of teeth in Morganucodon watsoni and Megazostrodon rudnerae is published by Jäger et al. (2019).
- A study on teeth development and replacement in Jurassic euharamiyidan mammals from the Yanliao Biota (China) is published by Mao et al. (2019).
- A study on the anatomy of the auditory and hyoid bones of Arboroharamiya allinhopsoni and Arboroharamiya jenkinsi is published online by Meng et al. (2019).
- A study on the tooth wear in Qishou and Shenshou from the Yanliao Biota, and on the occlusal modes present in "haramiyidan" taxa, is published by Mao & Meng (2019).
- A study on the anatomy of the petrosal of Borealestes is published by Panciroli, Schultz & Luo (2019), who also generate an endocast of the inner ear of Borealestes.
- A study on the anatomy of the mandible and teeth of Borealestes serendipitus and on the phylogenetic relationships of this species, based on data from new specimens from the Isle of Skye (Scotland), is published by Panciroli, Benson & Luo (2019).
- A revision of the teeth and mandibular fossils of members of the genus Docodon from Yale Quarry 9 at the Como Bluff site in the Upper Jurassic Morrison Formation is published by Schultz, Bhullar & Luo (2019), who argue that the fossils from that quarry represent only one species, Docodon victor.
- A study on the anatomy of the inner ear and surrounding structures in Priacodon fruitaensis and two isolated stem therian petrosal specimens from the Aptian or Albian Höövör locality (Mongolia) is published by Harper & Rougier (2019).
- A study comparing the anatomy and function of skulls of rodents and multituberculates, and evaluating their implications for inferring whether the extinction of multituberculates was caused by competition with rodents, is published by Adams et al. (2019).
- A study on the anatomy of skull and teeth of Maotherium sinense, based on data from a three-dimensionally preserved skull from the Lower Cretaceous Yixian Formation (China), is published online by Plogschties & Martin (2019).
- A study on the anatomy of the postcranial skeleton of Henkelotherium guimarotae is published online by Jäger, Luo & Martin (2019).
- Description of new dental and dentary specimens of Reigitherium from the Upper Cretaceous La Colonia Formation (Argentina) and a study on the phylogenetic relationships of this taxon is published by Harper, Parras & Rougier (2019).

== General research ==
- A study on the origin of the mammalian middle ear ossicles, as indicated by the anatomy of the jaw-otic complex in 43 synapsid taxa, is published by Navarro-Díaz, Esteve-Altava & Rasskin-Gutman (2019).
- A study on the evolution of the morphological complexity of the mammalian vertebral column, as indicated by data from mammals and non-mammalian synapsids, is published by Jones, Angielczyk & Pierce (2019).
- A study on the ecological structure of Mesozoic mammaliaform communities is published by Chen, Strömberg & Wilson (2019).
- A study on the diversification of functional morphology of jaws in Mammaliaformes in general and crown-therians in particular from the Early Jurassic to the end of the Eocene, focusing on changes occurring across the Cretaceous-Paleogene boundary, is published by Benevento, Benson & Friedman (2019).
- A study on the evolution of foot posture in mammals, and on the effects of posture on body size evolution, is published by Kubo et al. (2019).
- A study on arrangements of tarsal bones in mammals, focusing on extinct South American ungulates, is published by Lorente (2019).
- A review of ecological diversifications of mammals throughout their evolutionary history is published by Grossnickle, Smith & Wilson (2019).
- A study on the ancestral tribosphenic therian chewing stroke, as conserved in the extant gray short-tailed opossum, is published by Bhullar et al. (2019).
- A review of the biogeographic history of mammals and other terrestrial vertebrates from the Mesozoic of Gondwana is published by Krause et al. (2019).
- A protocol for reconstructing 3D models of skulls of extinct species of small mammals known only from fragmentary fossils is proposed by Moya-Costa, Cuenca-Bescós & Bauluz (2019), who present reconstructions of the skulls of fossil shrews Beremendia fissidens and Dolinasorex glyphodon.
- A study on the impact of uncertainty of stratigraphic age of fossils on studies estimating species divergence times which incorporate fossil taxa, based on data from the fossil record of North American mammals and from the dataset of extant and fossil cetaceans, is published by Barido-Sottani et al. (2019).
- A study on the ecological spectrum of six sequential terrestrial mammal faunas of the North American Cenozoic, aiming to assess the potential influence of long-term climatic shifts on the ecomorphological composition of these faunas, is published by Figueirido et al. (2019).
- A study comparing the utility of classic morphometric indices and three-dimensional landmarks configuration to infer diet of carnivorous fossil mammals is published by Tarquini et al. (2019).
- A review of the fossil record of terrestrial mammals from Antarctica is published by Gelfo et al. (2019).
- A study on the taphonomy and age of mammal fossils from the Gruta do Ioiô cave (Salitre Formation; Chapada Diamantina region, Brazil), and on the paleoecology of fossil mammals from this site, is published online by Eltink et al. (2019).
- A study determining the sex of 186 Holarctic bison specimens known from subfossil remains, of 91 subfossil brown bear specimens and of mammal specimens from 4 large museum mammal collections representing multiple orders is published by Gower et al. (2019), who report a significant skew toward males among the studied specimens and search for possible explanations of the observed skew in sex ratio.
- A study determining the origins of nocturnal behavior in early mammals as correlating to sperm preservation.
