= Natrona natronensis =

Natrona natronensis Temporal range: Eocene (Lutetian–Bartonian)

Scientific classification
- Kingdom: Animalia
- Phylum: Chordata
- Class: Mammalia
- Infraclass: Placentalia
- Order: Rodentia
- Family: †Sciuravidae
- Genus: †Natrona; Dawson, 2019
- Species: †N. natronensis

Binomial name
- †Natrona natronensis Dawson, 2019

Extinct rodent species

Natrona natronensis is an extinct species of sciuravid rodent known from the Eocene Wagon Bed Formation (Hendry Ranch locality) of Wyoming, United States. It is the only species in the genus Natrona.
