= Tohoraonepu =

Tohoraonepu Temporal range: Late Oligocene

Scientific classification
- Kingdom: Animalia
- Phylum: Chordata
- Class: Mammalia
- Order: Artiodactyla
- Suborder: Whippomorpha
- Infraorder: Cetacea
- Family: †Kekenodontidae
- Genus: †Tohoraonepu; Corrie & Fordyce, 2024
- Species: †T. nihokaiwaiu

Binomial name
- †Tohoraonepu nihokaiwaiu Corrie & Fordyce, 2024

Extinct genus of mammals

Tohoraonepu is an extinct genus of kekenodontid cetacean that lived in the South Pacific during the Chattian stage of the Oligocene epoch. It is a monotypic genus known from the species Tohoraonepu nihokaiwaiu.
