= Borealodon =

Borealodon Temporal range: Early Oligocene (Rupelian), 30.6–28.3 Ma

Scientific classification
- Kingdom: Animalia
- Phylum: Chordata
- Class: Mammalia
- Infraclass: Placentalia
- Order: Artiodactyla
- Infraorder: Cetacea
- Family: †Aetiocetidae
- Genus: †Borealodon; Shipps, Peredo & Pyenson, 2019
- Species: †B. osedax

Binomial name
- †Borealodon osedax Shipps, Peredo & Pyenson, 2019

Extinct genus of whales

Borealodon is a genus of extinct baleen whale known from the Oligocene of Washington State, USA. First described in 2019, the genus currently contains only the type species: B. osedax. The bones of the holotype specimen were first described not for their own sake, but for the preserved feeding traces of bone-eating worms (Osedax) found on them. This feature is also where the specific epithet was sourced from, directly referencing the worms. The genus name means "tooth of the north", from Boreal-, meaning "of or relating to the Northern Hemisphere or the north", and the Latin -odon, meaning "tooth".

== Classification ==
Borealodon is a member of the extinct baleen whale family Aetiocetidae. These form an early offshoot of the group, and arose during the Oligocene period. Unlike later mysticetes, these animals did not possess baleen plates, instead having toothed jaws. Within this group, Borealodon generally places alongside the slightly younger Salishicetus, also found in Washington State.

Below is a modified phylogenetic tree of Aetiocetidae reproduced from Hernández Cisneros & Velez-Juarbe, 2024:

- Cetacea
  - †Zygorhiza
  - Neoceti
    - - †Mystacodon
      - †Llanocetus
    - - Odontoceti
      - Mysticeti
        - †Coronodon
        - - †Mammalodontidae
          - - †Aetiocetidae
              - - †Morawanocetus
                - †Chonecetus
              - - - †Fucaia
                - - - †Salishicetus
                    - †Borealodon
                  - - - †Kaaucetus
                    - - †Aetiocetus
            - - Chaeomysticeti (toothless mysticetes)
