= Inticetus =

Inticetus Temporal range: Early Miocene ~18–16.0 Ma

Scientific classification
- Domain: Eukaryota
- Kingdom: Animalia
- Phylum: Chordata
- Class: Mammalia
- Order: Artiodactyla
- Infraorder: Cetacea
- Parvorder: Odontoceti
- Family: †Inticetidae
- Genus: †Inticetus; Lambert et al. 2017

Species
- I. vertizi Lambert et al. 2017 (type)

Extinct genus of mammals

Inticetus is an extinct genus of Early Miocene odontocete from the Chilcatay Formation, Pisco Basin, Peru.

== Description ==
Inticetus is distinguished from other archaic heterodont odontocetes by the following features: long and robust rostrum bearing at least 18 teeth per quadrant; the absence of procumbent anterior teeth; many large, broad-based accessory denticles in double-rooted posterior cheek teeth; a reduced ornament of dental crowns; the styliform process of the jugal being markedly robust; a large fovea epitubaria on the periotic, with a correspondingly voluminous accessory ossicle of the tympanic bulla; and a shortened tuberculum of the malleus.

== Classification ==
Inticetus was judged by Lambert et al. to be sufficiently distinct from other archaic heterodont odontocetes to be placed in a new family, Inticetidae. The authors recovered it as either outside crown Odontoceti or as an early-branching member of Platanistoidea.

Phococetus, previously assigned to Kekenodontidae, is apparently a relative of Inticetus.
