= Hercynodon =

Hercynodon Temporal range: Kimmeridgian

Scientific classification
- Kingdom: Animalia
- Phylum: Chordata
- Class: Mammalia
- Order: †Dryolestida
- Family: †Dryolestidae
- Genus: †Hercynodon
- Species: †H. germanicus

Binomial name
- †Hercynodon germanicus Martin et al., 2021

Hercynodon is an extinct genus of dryolestid that lived during the Kimmeridgian stage of the Late Jurassic epoch.

== Distribution ==
Hercynodon germanicus is known from the Langenberg Quarry. a fossiliferous locality of the Süntel Formation in North Rhine-Westphalia, Germany.
