= Lyrakeryx =

Lyrakeryx Temporal range: Middle Miocene, 12.1–10.1 Ma

Scientific classification
- Kingdom: Animalia
- Phylum: Chordata
- Class: Mammalia
- Order: Artiodactyla
- Family: Giraffidae
- Subfamily: †Sivatheriinae (?)
- Genus: †Lyrakeryx; Ríos & Solounias, 2025
- Species: †L. sherkana

Binomial name
- †Lyrakeryx sherkana (Ríos & Solounias, 2024)

Synonyms
- Lyra Ríos & Solounias, 2024 (preoccupied)

Genus of extinct giraffid mammals

Lyrakeryx is an extinct genus of giraffid artiodactyl ungulates from the Miocene Chinji Formation of Pakistan. The genus contains a single species, Lyrakeryx sherkana, known from a partial skull and fragmentary ossicones. Lyrakeryx may be a member of the subfamily Sivatheriinae, making it the oldest known record of this clade.

== Discovery and naming ==
The fossil material of Lyrakeryx was discovered in sediments of the Chinji Formation in the Siwalik Hills of Pakistan. The holotype specimen, YGSP 47357, was discovered in 1994 and comprises a partial skull, including the braincase, basicranium, occipital, and ossicones ("horn-like" structures in giraffids). Four additional ossicone fragments (YGSP 6392, 47192, 49597, and 20651) from other localities in the Chinji Formation were also assigned as paratypes.

In 2024, Ríos & Solounias described Lyra sherkana as a new genus and species of giraffids based on these fossil remains. The generic name, Lyra references the lyre string instrument. This name was chosen after the similarity between the shape of the animal's ossicones and the instrument. The specific name, sherkana, honors Tanya Sher Khan, the discoverer of the holotype.

The original proposed genus name, Lyra, is preoccupied by a snail, clam, brachiopod, and fish. As such, Ríos & Solounias (2025) coined the replacement generic name Lyrakeryx, adding the suffix "-keryx", meaning "horns".

In 2025, Solounias and Danowitz provisionally referred three Lyrakeryx specimens (YGSP 47357, 6392, and 47192) to Decennatherium. However, they also noted differences from this taxon and several similarities to Bramatherium.
