= Süntel Formation =

Geological formation in Germany

- Stratigraphic range: Kimmeridgian; ~155–151 Ma
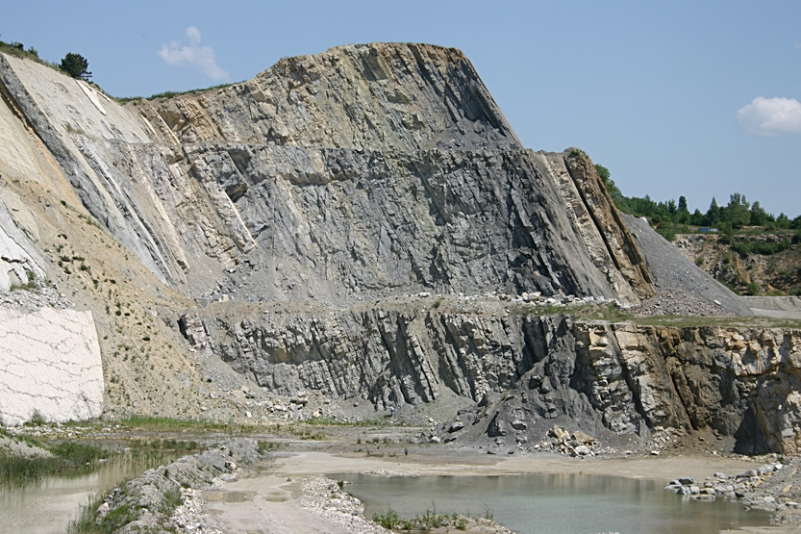
- Süntel Formation at Langenberg quarry
- Type: Geological formation
- Sub-units: Sand-Tonkomplex & Unterbank Members
- Underlies: Gigas-Schichten & Holzen Formation
- Overlies: Korallenoolith Formation
- Thickness: Variable, over 60 m (200 ft) at Langenberg Quarry

Lithology
- Primary: Limestone
- Other: Sandstone, claystone, marl

Location
- Coordinates: 52.3°N 8.8°E
- Approximate paleocoordinates: 43.4°N 16.9°E
- Region: Nordrhein-Westfalen, Niedersachsen
- Country: Germany
- Extent: Lower Saxony Basin

Type section
- Named for: Süntel
- Location: Lower Saxon Hills
- Region: Niedersachsen
- Süntel Formation (Germany)

The Süntel Formation, previously known as the Kimmeridge Formation (German: "Mittlerer Kimmeridge"; Middle Kimmeridge), is a geological formation in Germany. It is Late Jurassic in age, spanning the early to late Kimmeridgian stage. It predominantly consists of limestone deposited in shallow marine carbonate ramp conditions.

== Description ==
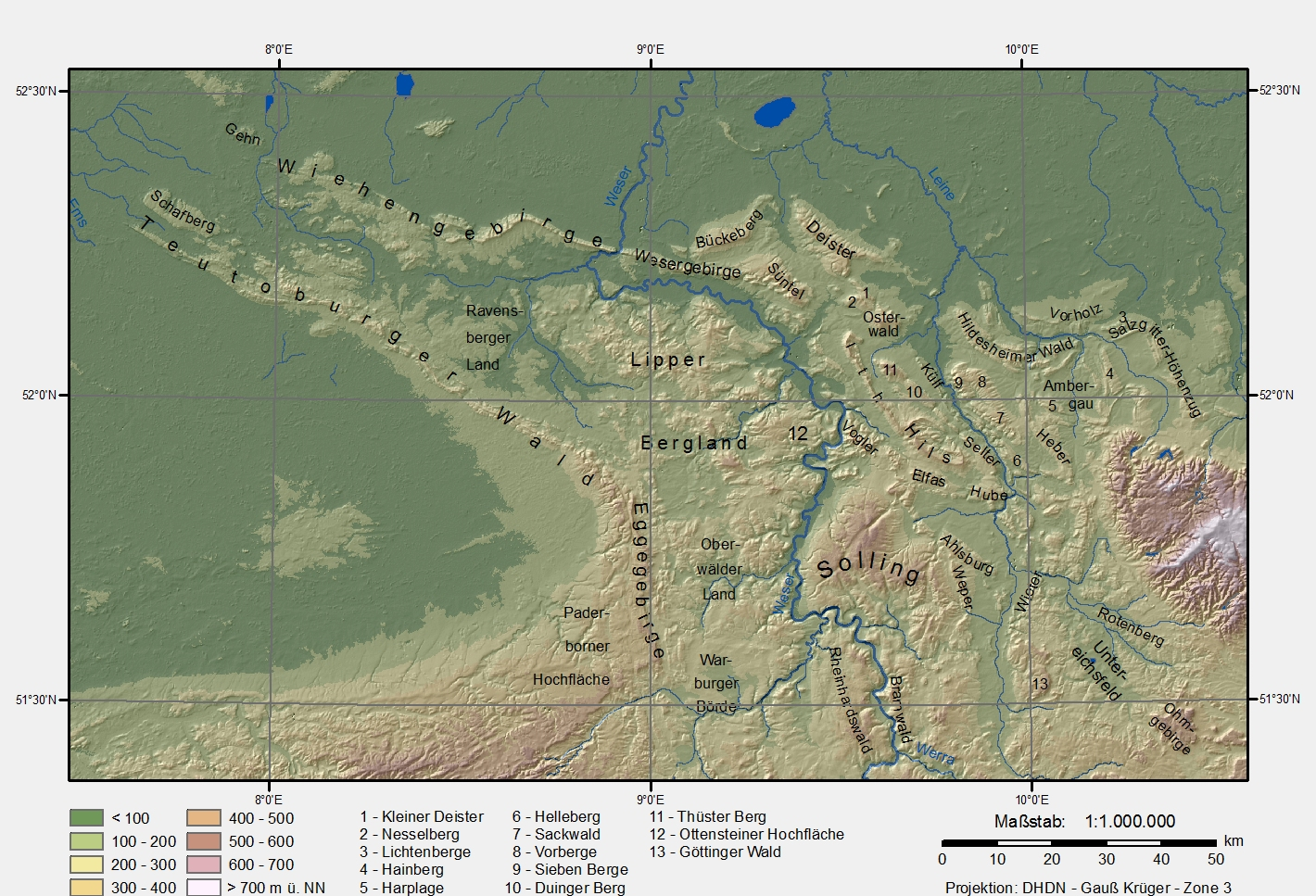
Map of the Lower Saxon Hills with Süntel center-right

The formation is part of the Lower Saxony Basin that borders the Süntel massif of the Lower Saxon Hills, part of the larger Harz Mountains. The formation is described as alternations of glauconitic marl, limestone and sandstone.

== Paleontological significance ==
The formation is known for its fossils, with the Langenberg Quarry having provided fossils of numerous vertebrates.

=== Dinosaurs ===
Dinosaurs of the Süntel Formation
Genus	Species	Location	Stratigraphic position	Abundance	Notes	Images
Allosauroidea indet.		Langenberg Quarry	Bed 83	DfMMh/FV1/19, small pedal ungual, cf. DfMMh/FV/343, small pedal phalanx		
Allosaurus	A. sp.	Langenberg Quarry	Bed 83	Teeth	Teeth referable to Allosaurus.	
cf. Ceratosauria indet.		Langenberg Quarry	Bed 83	DfMMh/FV/776, anterior chevron		
Europasaurus	E. holgeri	Langenberg Quarry	Bed 83	Disarticulated remains representing numerous individuals	Brachiosauridae Sauropod	
cf. Megalosauroidea indet.	Indeterminate	Langenberg Quarry	Bed 83	DfMMh/FV/287, left fibula		
Stegosauridae indet.	Indeterminate	Langenberg Quarry	Bed 83	Teeth		
cf. Tetanurae indet.	Indeterminate	Langenberg Quarry	Bed 83	DfMMh/FV/105, distal caudal vertebra		
Theropoda indet.	Indeterminate	Langenberg Quarry	Bed 83	DfMMh/FV2/19, a small pedal phalanx III-1, DfMMh/FV3/19, proximal part of a small right fibula		
cf.Torvosaurus	Indeterminate	Langenberg Quarry	Bed 83	Teeth	Teeth regarded as likely referable to Torvosaurus.	

=== Turtles ===
Turtles of the Süntel Formation
Genus	Species	Location	Stratigraphic position	Abundance	Notes	Images
Eucryptodira indet.	Indeterminate	Langenberg Quarry	Bed 73	Juvenile carapace with disarticulated skull and right forelimb		
Plesiochelys	Indeterminate					
cf. Thalassemys	Indeterminate			DFMMh/FV 296, "skull part (articulated quadrate, squamosal, basisphenoid, and pterygoid), a disarticulated 40 cm long partial carapace, plastron, and one cervical vertebra."		

=== Squamates ===
Squamates of the Süntel Formation
Genus	Species	Location	Stratigraphic position	Abundance	Notes	Images
Paramacellodidae indet.	Indeterminate	Langenberg Quarry		Partial skeleton		

=== Pterosaurs ===
Pterosaurs of the Süntel Formation
Genus	Species	Location	Stratigraphic position	Abundance	Notes	Images
?Dsungaripteridae indet.	Indeterminate	Langenberg Quarry		DFMMh/FV 500, an articulated partial skeleton consisting of "10 thoracic vertebrae, complete pelvis and sacrum, left and right femur" with an associated possible partial right tibia.		

=== Crocodyliformes ===
Crocodyliformes of the Süntel Formation
Genus	Species	Location	Stratigraphic position	Abundance	Notes	Images
Goniopholis	G. simus	Langenberg Quarry				
Knoetschkesuchus	K. langenbergensis		Bed 83	two partial skeletons and various isolated bones	Atoposaurid	
Machimosaurus	M. hugii					
Steneosaurus	S. brevirostris			Rostrum, jaw and postcranial remains		

=== Mammaliaforms ===
Mammaliaforms of the Süntel Formation
Genus	Species	Location	Stratigraphic position	Abundance	Notes	Images
Cimbriodon	C. multituberculatus	Langenberg Quarry	Bed 83	upper and lower p3, p4 and p5 molars	Paulchoffatiid multituberculate	
Docodon	D. hercynicus	Langenberg Quarry	Bed 83	two lower molars	Docodontid	
Docodon	D. sp	Langenberg Quarry	Bed 83	distal fragment of lower molar	Docodontid	
Dryolestida indet.	Indeterminate	Langenberg Quarry	Bed 83			
Teutonodon	T. langenbergensis	Langenberg Quarry	Bed 83	NLMH 105650, upper right M1	Pinheirodontid multituberculate	
Hercynodon	H. germanicus	Langenberg Quarry	Bed 83	NLMH 105668, left upper molar, NLMH 105669-70 right upper molars, NLMH 105671 left lower molar	Dryolestid	
Paulchoffatiidae indet.	Indeterminate	Langenberg Quarry	Bed 83	NLMH 105655, left p4, NLMH 105651; m1	NLMH 105651 considered an Eobataarid by Martin et al. 2016, considered a Paulchoffatiid by Martin et al. 2019	
Storchodon	S. cingulatus	Langenberg Quarry	Bed 83	MH 105654, a right upper molar	A large morganucodont	

=== Ichnofossils ===
Ichnofossils of the Süntel Formation
Genus	Species	Location	Stratigraphic position	Abundance	Notes	Images
Elephantopoides	E. sp.					
Grallator (Eubrontes)	G. (Eubrontes) sp.					
Iguanodontipus	?I. sp.	Strömer quarry tracksite				
Megalosauripus	M. teutonicus	Bruns quarry tracksite	Sand-Tonkomplex Member			

== See also ==
- List of fossiliferous stratigraphic units in Germany
