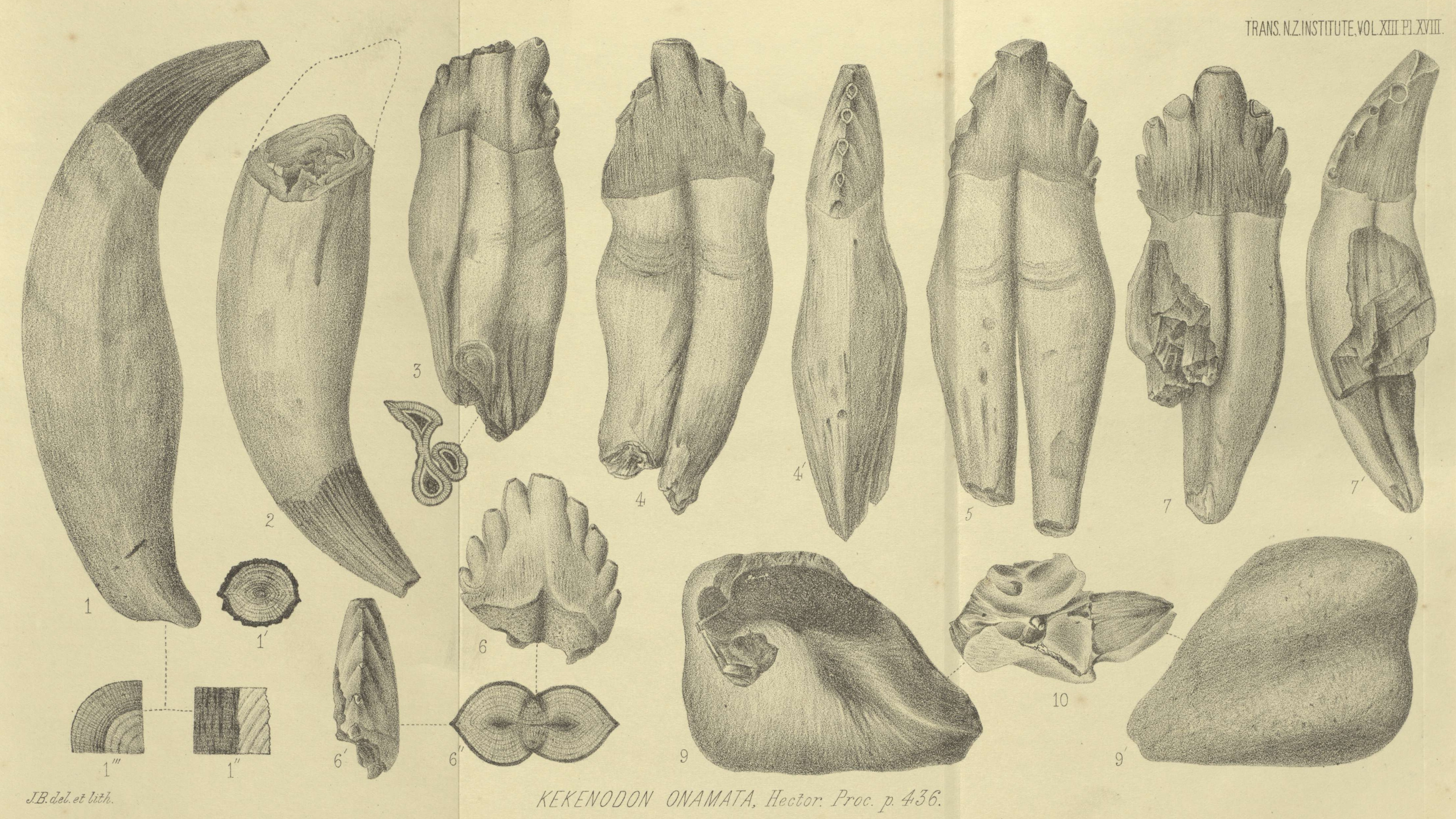
- Teeth of Kekenodon onamata

Scientific classification
- Domain: Eukaryota
- Kingdom: Animalia
- Phylum: Chordata
- Class: Mammalia
- Order: Artiodactyla
- Infraorder: Cetacea
- Family: †Kekenodontidae; Mitchell, 1989
- Genus: †Kekenodon; Hector, 1881

Species
- †K. onamata Hector, 1881

= Kekenodon =

Kekenodon Temporal range: Late Oligocene

Genus of mammals

Kekenodon is an extinct kekenodontid early whale from the Late Oligocene (Chattian) of New Zealand. Measuring 8–9 m (26–30 ft) long, it was a large raptorial whale which hunted marine mammals and penguins. Although at times classified as a basilosaurid, mysticete, or odontocete, recent work suggests that it represents a phylogenetic intermediate form between Basilosauridae and Neoceti.

== Classification ==
Kekenodon was considered a member of the basilosaurid subfamily Dorudontinae in the classic monograph on Archaeoceti by Kellogg (1936).

"Squalodon" gambierensis from Australia is a close relative of Kekenodon.

Phylogenetic analysis suggests that Kekenodon is the "latest-surviving archaeocete, sister-taxon to the Neoceti."
