= Pahelia =

Pahelia Temporal range: Ypresian

Scientific classification
- Kingdom: Animalia
- Phylum: Chordata
- Class: Mammalia
- Genus: †Pahelia
- Species: †P. mysteriosa

Binomial name
- †Pahelia mysteriosa Zack et al., 2021

Extinct genus of mammals

Pahelia is an extinct genus of mammal from India that lived during the Ypresian. It contains a single species, P. mysteriosa.
