= Apeirodon =

Apeirodon Temporal range: Priabonian

Scientific classification
- Kingdom: Animalia
- Phylum: Chordata
- Class: Mammalia
- Genus: †Apeirodon
- Species: †A. sorianoi

Binomial name
- †Apeirodon sorianoi Babot et al., 2019

Extinct genus of mammals

Apeirodon is an extinct genus of mammal belonging to the clade Polypodiomorphia that inhabited Argentina during the Eocene epoch. It contains a single species, A. sorianoi.
