= Pseudocricetodontinae =

Scientific classification
- Kingdom: Animalia
- Phylum: Chordata
- Class: Mammalia
- Order: Rodentia
- Family: Cricetidae
- Subfamily: †Pseudocricetodontinae; Engesser, 1987

Subfamily of rodents

Pseudocricetodontinae is a subfamily of extinct mice of the family Cricetidae. Pseudocricetodontinae species were common in the southeast part of Serbia.

== History ==
These mice were probably the first rodent during the late Eocene or early Oligocene in age to be in balkan area. The name Pseudocricetodontinae was coined by Burkart Engesser, a Swiss palaeontologist and zoologist, in 1987.

== Taxonomy ==
There has been a lot of debate over the evolution of Pseudocricetodontinae (as is the case with many mice). Many palaeontologists have been working on following the evolution of Pseudocricetodontinae. Some of the way that these palaeontologists have been trying to identify the taxonomy of this clade, is using their:

- Molars and teeth enamel;
- Hollows in the cheek; and
- The cusps in the cheeks.

Lots of mammals can be identified by their molars and other parts of their mouth. All mammals have what are known as cheek teeth, such as molars that are adapted to accomplish certain tasks. These teeth can be essential for tracking the evolution of mammals, and is often used to identify rodents.

Identifying this taxonomy has been a slightly challenging task as all of this information is coming from the rare fossils of these mice.
