= Thaumastocyonini =

Thaumastocyonini Temporal range: Early Oligocene–Late Oligocene

Scientific classification
- Kingdom: Animalia
- Phylum: Chordata
- Class: Mammalia
- Order: Carnivora
- Family: †Amphicyonidae
- Subfamily: †Amphicyoninae
- Tribe: †Thaumastocyonini; Ginsburg (1977)

Extinct tribe of carnivores

Thaumastocyonini is an extinct tribe of large, carnivorous mammals (bone-crushers) known as bear dogs, of the family Amphicyonidae, subfamily Amphicyoninae, which inhabited Europe during the Miocene living from ~16.9—7.25 Ma and existed for approximately 9.65 million years. It was originally erected to include only the genus Agnotherium, and is no longer used.
