= Storchodon =

Storchodon Temporal range: Kimmeridgian

Scientific classification
- Domain: Eukaryota
- Kingdom: Animalia
- Phylum: Chordata
- Clade: Synapsida
- Clade: Therapsida
- Clade: Cynodontia
- Clade: Mammaliaformes
- Order: †Morganucodonta
- Genus: †Storchodon; Martin et al., 2019
- Species: †S. cingulatus

Binomial name
- †Storchodon cingulatus Martin et al., 2019

Extinct genus of mammaliaforms

Storchodon is an extinct genus of morganucodont mammaliaforms from the Late Jurassic (Kimmeridgian) of Germany. Its only species is Storchodon cingulatus, which is known exclusively from a single upper molar found at the Süntel Formation of Lower Saxony.

== Etymology ==
The generic name Storchodon honours the German palaeontologist Gerhard Storch, whereas the specific epithet cingulatus is a reference to the prominent cingulum of the molar.

== Description ==
Storchodon was large for a morganucodont; the holotype molar has a length of 3.07 millimetres (0.121 in), which among morganucodonts is exceeded only by the holotype of Paceyodon davidi. This large size may be a case of insular gigantism. As in other morganucodonts, the molar has a triconodont shape, with the three main cusps A, B and C being set in a straight line. Cusp D is relatively large, and unlike in for example Morganucodon, it is placed at an oblique angle relative to the main cusps.
