= Cervus canadensis combrayicus =

Cervus canadensis combrayicus Temporal range: Late Pleistocene

Scientific classification
- Kingdom: Animalia
- Phylum: Chordata
- Class: Mammalia
- Order: Artiodactyla
- Family: Cervidae
- Genus: Cervus
- Species: C. canadensis
- Subspecies: †C. c. combrayicus

Trinomial name
- †Cervus canadensis combrayicus Croitor, 2020

Synonyms
- Cervus elaphus acoronatus Beninde, 1937

Cervus canadensis combrayicus is an extinct subspecies of wapiti (Cervus canadensis) that lived in the Late Pleistocene of France. It confirms the presence of wapiti in Pleistocene Europe and has unique adaptations to its environment.

== Taxonomy ==
The subspecies was named Cervus canadensis combrayicus by Roman Croitor in 2020.

== Discovery ==
Cervus canadensis combrayicus was discovered in the Puy de Dôme region in France. It is only known from a well-preserved antlered braincase, and is currently housed in the Natural History Museum Henri-Lecoq in Clermont-Ferrand, France. It proves the presence of wapiti in Pleistocene Europe.

== Range ==
While only known from France, it is possible that the subspecies or similar populations ranged further into eastern Europe.

== Adaptations ==
The antlers of the wapiti show distinct adaptations to open landscapes of periglacial steppes and tundras.
