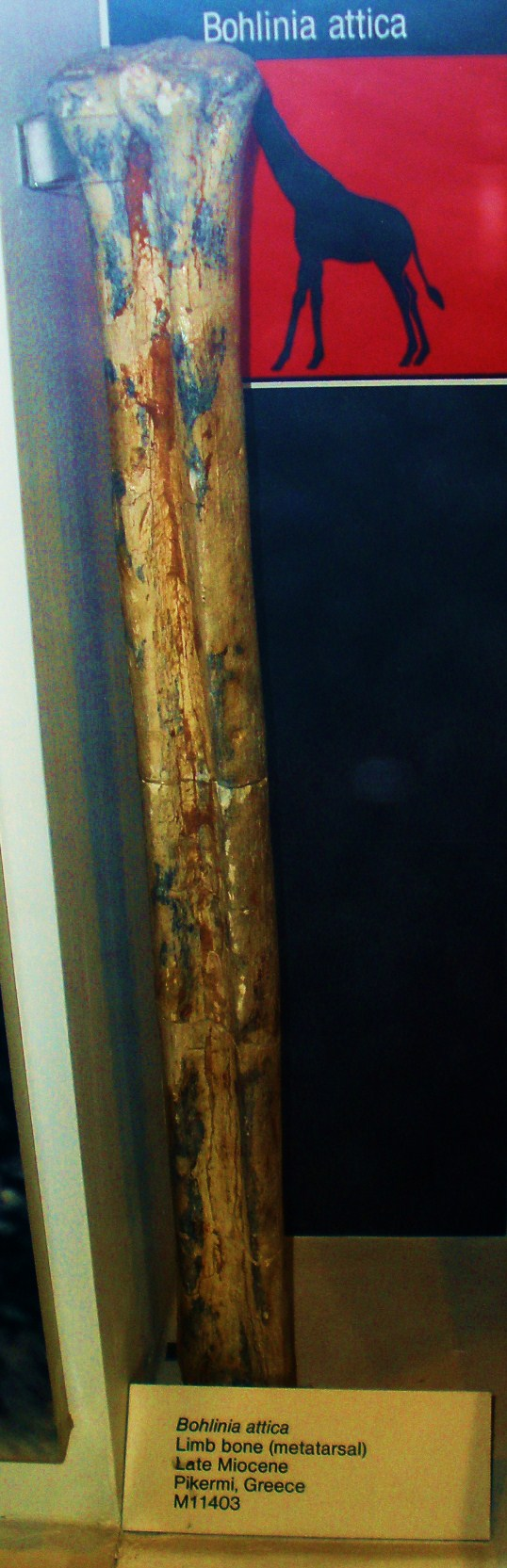
- Bohlinia attica fossil

Scientific classification
- Kingdom: Animalia
- Phylum: Chordata
- Class: Mammalia
- Order: Artiodactyla
- Family: Giraffidae
- Genus: †Bohlinia; Matthew, 1929

Species
- †Bohlinia adoumi; †Bohlinia attica

= Bohlinia =

Bohlinia Temporal range: 11.6–5.33 Ma Miocene

Extinct genus of mammals

Bohlinia is an extinct genus of the artiodactyl family Giraffidae that lived during the Late Miocene in Eurasia and Africa. It was first named by the paleontologist Dr. W. Matthew in 1929, and contains two species, B. adoumi and B. attica. The species B. attica has been reclassified several times since its description, being first named Camelopardalis attica and then reclassified as Giraffa attica.

== Palaeoecology ==
Dental mesowear analysis shows that B. attica exhibited browsing habits at the site of Samos but mixed feeding ones at Pikermi.
