= Niparajacetus =

Niparajacetus Temporal range: Late Oligocene

Scientific classification
- Kingdom: Animalia
- Phylum: Chordata
- Class: Mammalia
- Infraclass: Placentalia
- Order: Artiodactyla
- Infraorder: Cetacea
- Genus: †Niparajacetus
- Species: †N. palmadentis

Binomial name
- †Niparajacetus palmadentis Solis-Añorve et al., 2019

Extinct genus of cetaceans

Niparajacetus is an extinct genus of baleen whale that inhabited Mexico during the Late Oligocene. It contains the species N. palmadentis.
