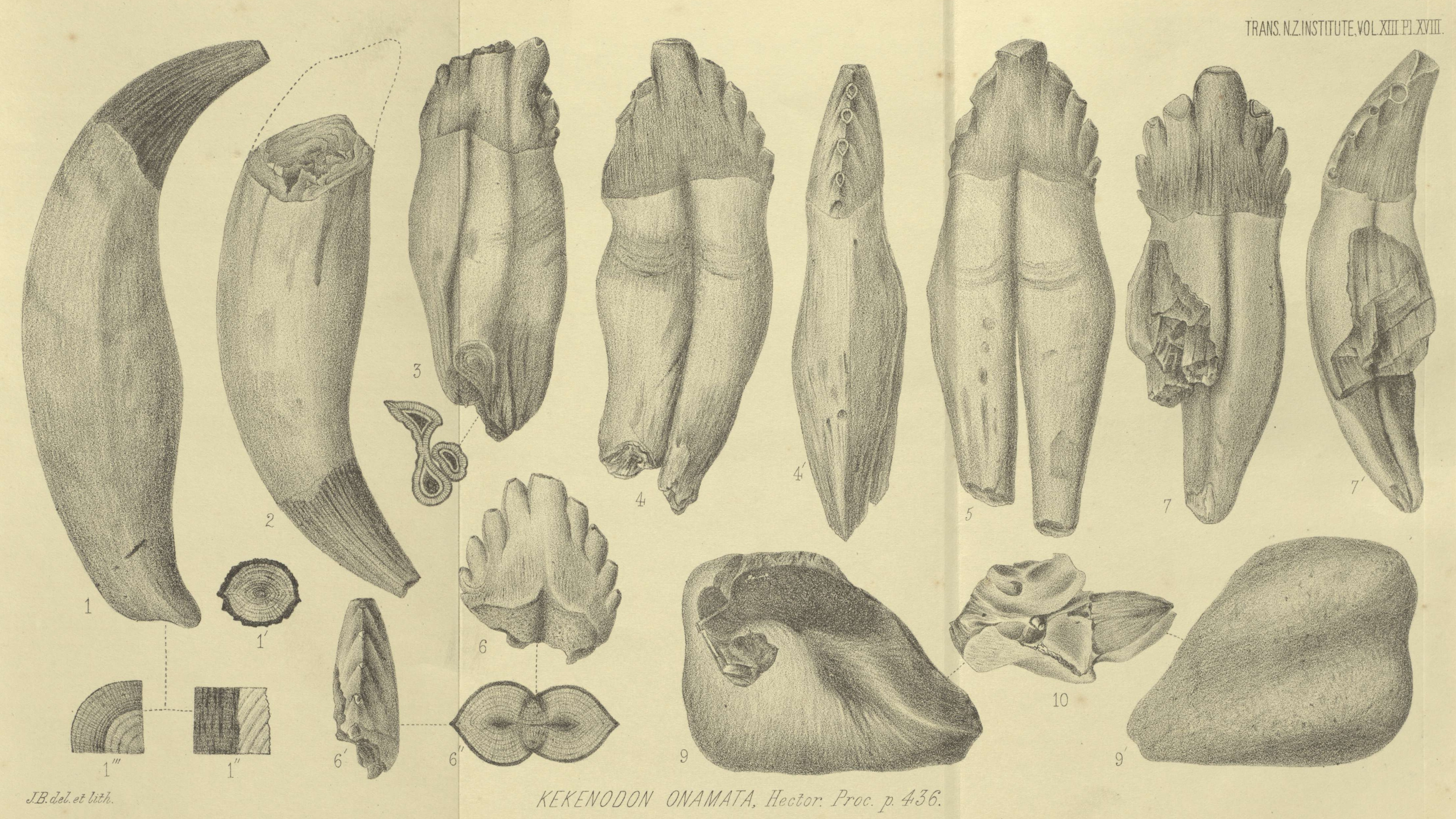
- Teeth of Kekenodon onamata

Scientific classification
- Kingdom: Animalia
- Phylum: Chordata
- Class: Mammalia
- Order: Artiodactyla
- Infraorder: Cetacea
- Family: †Kekenodontidae; Mitchell, 1989

Genera
- Kekenodon; Tohoraonepu

= Kekenodontidae =

Kekenodontidae Temporal range: Late Oligocene

Family of mammals

Kekenodontidae is an extinct family of non-neocete pelagicetes from the Late Oligocene (Chattian) epoch of New Zealand.

== Taxonomy ==
Although at times classified as basal mysticetes or basal odontocetes, recent cladistic analyses demonstrate that kekenodontids are phylogenetically intermediate between basilosaurids and neocetes.

== Palaeobiology ==
=== Palaeoecology ===
Isotopic study has found that the δ^{13}C values of kekenodontids were unusually low, suggesting that they fed mainly on prey belonging to low trophic levels.
