= Myotis gerhardstorchi =

Myotis gerhardstorchi Temporal range: Early Pliocene

Scientific classification
- Domain: Eukaryota
- Kingdom: Animalia
- Phylum: Chordata
- Class: Mammalia
- Order: Chiroptera
- Family: Vespertilionidae
- Genus: Myotis
- Species: †M. gerhardstorchi

Binomial name
- †Myotis gerhardstorchi Horáček & Trávníčková, 2019

Extinct species of bat

Myotis gerhardstorchi is an extinct species of Myotis that inhabited Hungary during the Zanclean stage.
