= Palaeoryx =

Palaeoryx Temporal range: Miocene

Scientific classification
- Domain: Eukaryota
- Kingdom: Animalia
- Phylum: Chordata
- Class: Mammalia
- Order: Artiodactyla
- Family: Bovidae
- Genus: †Palaeoryx; Gaudry, 1861

Species
- †P. majori Schlosser, 1904; †P. minor Vasileiadis et al., 2019; †P. pallasi Wagner, 1857

Extinct genus of mammals

Palaeoryx was a genus of bovid that lived during the Miocene epoch.

== Geographic range ==
Fossils of P. minor are known from Greece.
