= Saremmys =

Saremmys Temporal range: Miocene

Scientific classification
- Kingdom: Animalia
- Phylum: Chordata
- Class: Mammalia
- Infraclass: Placentalia
- Order: Rodentia
- Infraorder: Hystricognathi
- Parvorder: Caviomorpha
- Superfamily: Chinchilloidea
- Genus: †Saremmys; Busker et al., 2019
- Species: †S. ligcura

Binomial name
- †Saremmys ligcura Busker et al., 2019

Genus of mammals

Saremmys is an extinct genus of chinchilloid that lived in Argentina during the Miocene epoch. It contains the single species Saremmys ligcura.
