= Culebra Formation =

- Stratigraphic range: Aquitanian-Burdigalian (Late Arikareean-Hemingfordian); 23–19 Ma
- Type: Formation
- Sub-units: Emperador Limestone
- Underlies: Cucaracha Formation
- Overlies: Las Cascadas Formation
- Thickness: > 250 m (820 ft)

Lithology
- Primary: Sandstone, limestone, mudstone, shale
- Other: Siltstone, conglomerate, lignite

Location
- Coordinates: 9.1°N 79.7°W
- Approximate paleocoordinates: 8.4°N 77.5°W
- Region: Colón Province
- Country: Panama
- Extent: Panama Basin

Type section
- Named for: Culebra Cut
- Culebra Formation (Panama)

The Culebra Formation (Tcb) is a geologic formation in Panama. It preserves fossils dating back to the Miocene period; Early Miocene epoch, Aquitanian to Burdigalian stages (Late Arikareean to Hemingfordian in the NALMA classification). Fossils of Culebrasuchus have been found in and named after the formation. The thickness of the formation is at least 250 metres (820 ft) thick, and the age has been estimated as from 23 to 19 Ma.

== Fossil content ==
- Culebrasuchus mesoamericanus
- Culebratherium alemani
- Dentimides
- Panamacebus transitus
- Paratoceras orarius
- Purussaurus
- Podocnemididae indet.

== See also ==
- List of fossiliferous stratigraphic units in Panama
- Cucaracha Formation
- Gatún Formation
