= Culebratherium =

Culebratherium Temporal range: Burdigalian ~19 Ma

Scientific classification
- Domain: Eukaryota
- Kingdom: Animalia
- Phylum: Chordata
- Class: Mammalia
- Order: Sirenia
- Family: Dugongidae
- Subfamily: Dugonginae
- Genus: †Culebratherium; Vélez Juarbe & Wood 2019

Species
- C. alemani Vélez Juarbe & Wood 2019 (type)

Extinct genus of mammal

Culebratherium is an extinct genus of dugongid sirenian mammal which existed in what is now Panama during the Early Miocene. It takes its name from the upper member of the Culebra Formation of the Panama Canal Zone, in which the holotype fossil was found.
