= Hoplictis =

Hoplictis Temporal range: Miocene

Scientific classification
- Kingdom: Animalia
- Phylum: Chordata
- Class: Mammalia
- Order: Carnivora
- Family: Mustelidae
- Genus: †Hoplictis; Ginsburg, 1961

Extinct genus of carnivoran mammal

Hoplictis is an extinct genus of mustelid that inhabited Eurasia during the Miocene epoch. It contains the species H. baihu, H. florancei, H. noueli, H. helbingi, and H. anatolicus.
