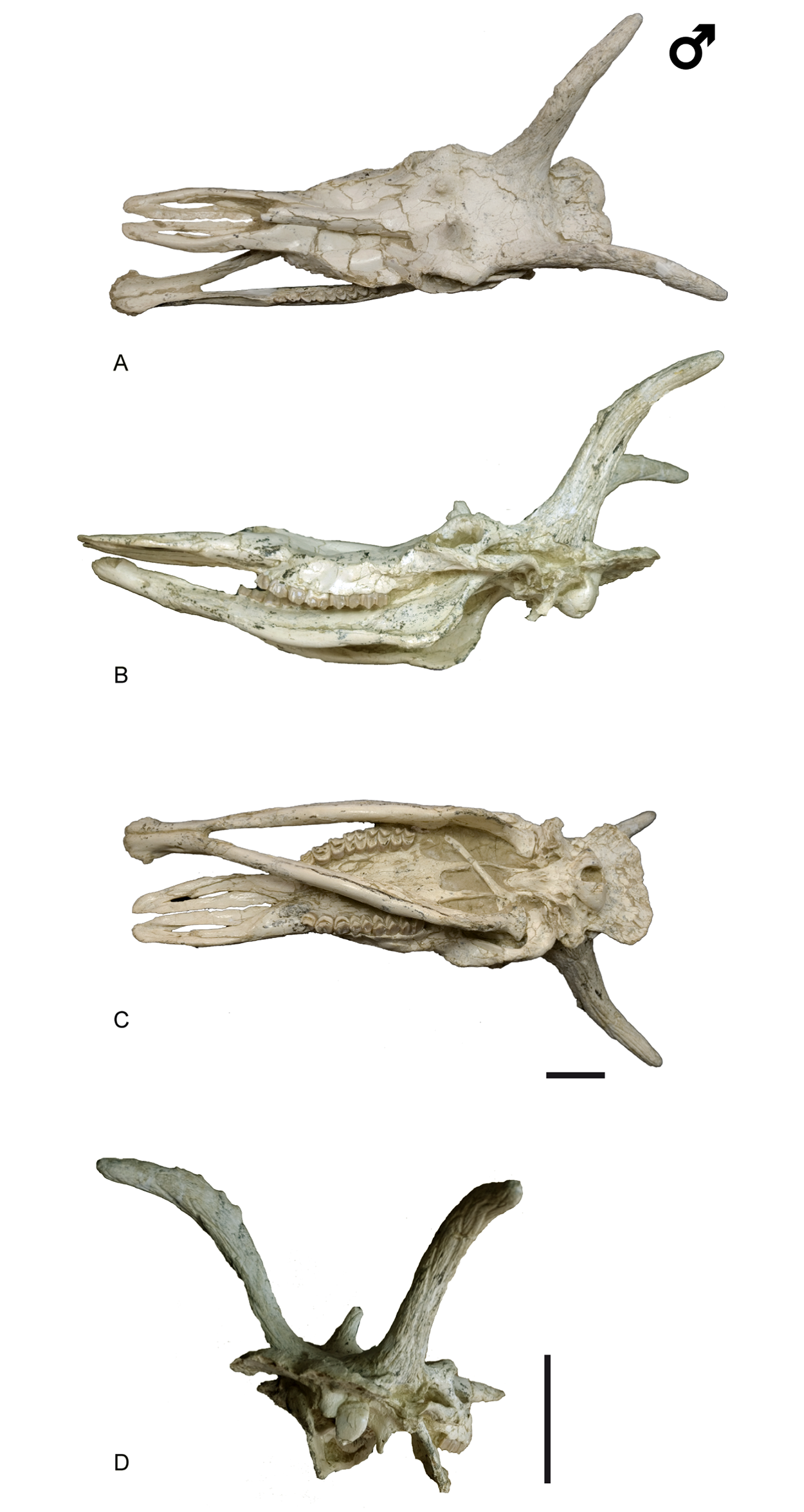
- Skull of the male D. rex holotype specimen

Scientific classification
- Kingdom: Animalia
- Phylum: Chordata
- Class: Mammalia
- Order: Artiodactyla
- Family: Giraffidae
- Genus: †Decennatherium; Crusafont, 1952

Species
- D. pachecoi Crusafont, 1952; D. crusafonti Bosscha-Erbrink, 1976; D. rex Ríos, Sánchez & Morales, 2017; D. asiaticum Ríos, Danowitz & Solounias, 2019

= Decennatherium =

Decennatherium Temporal range: Late Miocene (Tortonian) 11.6–7.8 Ma

Extinct genus of mammals

Decennatherium is an extinct genus of giraffids. The genus contains a total of four species with two species from Spain, D. pachecoi and D. rex, and two species respectively from Iran and Pakistan, D. crusafonti and D. asiaticum. In 2025, Solounias and Danowitz assigned the YGSP 47357, 6392, and 47192, previously referred to Lyrakeryx, to Decennatherium.

== Description ==
A juvenile D. rex specimen from Spain suggests that the ontogenetic development of ossicones in the species was similar to that of the modern giraffe.
