= Aplodontia minor =

Aplodontia minor Temporal range: Neogene

Scientific classification
- Kingdom: Animalia
- Phylum: Chordata
- Class: Mammalia
- Order: Rodentia
- Family: Aplodontiidae
- Genus: Aplodontia
- Species: †A. minor

Binomial name
- †Aplodontia minor Hopkins, 2019

Extinct species of mammal

Aplodontia minor is an extinct species of Aplodontia that inhabited North America during the Neogene period.
