= Cimbriodon =

Cimbriodon Temporal range: Kimmeridgian

Scientific classification
- Kingdom: Animalia
- Phylum: Chordata
- Class: Mammalia
- Order: †Multituberculata
- Genus: †Cimbriodon
- Species: †C. multituberculatus

Binomial name
- †Cimbriodon multituberculatus Martin et al., 2021

Extinct genus of multituberculate mammal

Cimbriodon is an extinct genus of multituberculate mammal that inhabited Germany during the Kimmeridgian. It contains a single species, C. multituberculatus.
