= Wagon Bed Formation =

Geologic formation in Wyoming, United States

- Stratigraphic range: Eocene
- Type: Formation

Lithology
- Primary: Tuff from the Yellowstone Caldera

Location
- Region: Wyoming
- Country: United States

The Wagon Bed Formation is a geologic formation in Wyoming. It preserves fossils dating back to the Paleogene period.

== See also ==
- List of fossiliferous stratigraphic units in Wyoming
- Paleontology in Wyoming
