= Paleobiota of the Renova Formation =

The Renova Formation is a geological formation exposed across numerous intermontane basins and valleys in southwest Montana. It covers an interval from the early Eocene to early Miocene (about 53 to 19 million years ago), with extensive fossils of both animals and plants in a warm temperate environment of wetlands, forests, and scrublands. This is a compendium of fossil species found in the Renova Formation and its regional equivalents (some of which may be referred to as formations in their own right).

== Local faunas ==
Fossil sites in the Renova Formation can be dated based on their mammal faunas, as part of the North American Land Mammal Age (NALMA) system. They extend from the middle Eocene (Bridgerian, Uintan, and Duchesnean) through the late Eocene (Chadronian) into the early Oligocene (Orellan), mid-Oligocene (Whitneyan), and late Oligocene to early Miocene (Arikareean). Major examples of distinctive local faunas in the Renova Formation (from youngest to oldest) include:

- Cabbage Patch Beds - The Cabbage Patch Beds are a fossil-rich set of strata, most extensively exposed in the Flint Creek and Deer Lodge basins. Their faunas correspond to a long stretch of the mid-late Oligocene (Arikareean), about 30-23 million years ago. The Cabbage Patch Beds can be divided further into Lower, Middle, and Upper subunits, each showing a slightly different set of dominant species and minor extinctions.
- Cook Ranch and Matador Ranch - These two local faunas are both within the titular Cook Ranch Member of the Sage Creek Basin in Beaverhead County. They date to the early Oligocene (Orellan), about 33-32 million years ago. Alongside Pipestone Springs and the Cabbage Patch Beds, the Cook Ranch local fauna is one of the most diverse mammal faunas in the formation.
- Easter Lily - Fossil sites in the Easter Lily area are within the Dunbar Creek Member, north of Pipestone Springs. Here, the Dunbar Creek Member crosses the Eocene-Oligocene boundary, extending from the Late Chadronian (Chadronian 4) in the northwest to the Early Orellan (Orellan 1) in the southeast. This area is also known as Palisade Cliffs.
- Little Pipestone Creek - The Little Pipestone Creek local fauna is south of Pipestone Springs and somewhat less diverse than that local fauna, but many species are still shared between each site. There are a few notable faunal differences: Pipestoneomys and Miohippus are more common at Little Pipestone Creek, for example. As with Pipestone Springs, Little Pipestone Creek is from the mid to late Chadronian (Chadronian 3–4) of the Climbing Arrow Member.
- Pipestone Springs - The Pipestone Springs local fauna is the most diverse single site in the Renova Formation, serving as the type locality for many species of fossil mammals. It is found in a couple small pockets of the Climbing Arrow Member, just west of Pipestone Hot Springs in Jefferson County. This site is mid-Chadronian (Chadronian 3) in age, about 35 million years ago. Apart from the abundant body fossils, carnivoran coprolites are also common at the site.
- McCarty's Mountain - The McCarty's Mountain local fauna is from a thick, undifferentiated, and heavily faulted part of the Renova Formation southeast of McCartney Mountain in Madison County. It is most likely Late Early Chadronian (Chadronian 2) in age. The most common mammals are early oreodonts, particularly Oreonetes anceps.
- Diamond O Ranch - The Diamond O Ranch local fauna is within the Climbing Arrow Member, just west of Beaverhead Rock in Beaverhead County. Its exact age is debatably Late Duchesnean or Early Chadronian (Chadronian 1), about 37 million years old. Based on its rodent species, Korth and Tabrum (2017) prefer the Early Chadronian estimate. The most common mammals are lagomorphs: Mytonolagus ashfordi and Palaeolagus sp. The Diamond O Ranch sites represent about 100 ft (30 m) of gray bentonitic mudstone and sandstone.
- Shoddy Springs - The Shoddy Springs local fauna is within the Climbing Arrow Member of the Three Forks Basin in Jefferson County. It is dated to the Duchesnean and retains older faunal components such as multituberculates and hyopsodontids.
- The Dell Beds and Sage Creek Member, in the Sage Creek Basin, preserve the oldest mammal faunas out of any Renova-equivalent strata. The mammal fossils of the Dell Beds are late Uintan, and the Sage Creek Member fauna is early Bridgerian (about 50-49 million years ago).

== Birds ==
Birds of the Renova Formation
Genus / Taxon	Species	NALMA	Strata	Notes	Images
Zygodactylus	Z. ochlurus	Orellan?	Ruby Paper Shale	A zygodactylid known from a partial skeleton with feather imprints.	

== Mammals ==
=== Artiodactyla ===
Indeterminate homacodontids and agriochoerids are reported from the Dell beds. Indeterminate oreodonts, oromerycids, and leptotraguline protoceratids are reported from the Climbing Arrow Member (Diamond O Ranch l.f.). Indeterminate tayassuids (peccaries) are reported from the Cabbage Patch beds.

Artiodactyls of the Renova Formation
Genus / Taxon	Species	NALMA	Strata	Notes	Images
Agriochoerus	A.? maximus	Chadronian	Climbing Arrow (Little Pipestone Creek l.f.)	An agriochoerid (climbing relative of oreodonts)	
Agriochoerus	A. sp.	Chadronian	Douglass Creek beds, Climbing Arrow (Pipestone Springs l.f.)	An agriochoerid (climbing relative of oreodonts)	
Arretotherium	A. acridens	Arikareean	Blacktail Deer Creek	An anthracothere (herbivorous relative of hippos)	
Bathygenys	B. alpha	Chadronian	Climbing Arrow (Pipestone Springs and Little Pipestone Creek l.f.)	An oreonetine oreodont (a sheep-like relative of camels).	
Bathygenys	B. cf. B. alpha	Chadronian	McCarty's Mountain l.f.	An oreonetine oreodont (a sheep-like relative of camels).	
Daeodon	D. sp.	Arikareean	middle Cabbage Patch beds	A large late-surviving entelodont (a boar-like omnivorous relative of hippos).	
Diplobunops	D. matthewi	Uintan	Dell beds	An agriochoerid (climbing relative of oreodonts)	
Elomeryx?	E.? sp.	Orellan	Cook Ranch (Cook Ranch l.f.)	A bothriodontine anthracothere (herbivorous relative of hippos).	
Hendryomeryx	H. cf. H. defordi	Chadronian	Climbing Arrow (Diamond O Ranch l.f.)	A leptomerycid (early ruminant)	
Hendryomeryx	H.? sp.	Chadronian - Orellan	Climbing Arrow (Little Pipestone Creek l.f.), Cook Ranch (Cook Ranch l.f.)	A leptomerycid (early ruminant)	
Hypisodus	H. minimus	Chadronian	Dunbar Creek	A small hypertragulid (early ruminant)	
Kukusepasutanka	K. schultzi	Arikareean	lower Cabbage Patch beds	A very large bothriodontine anthracothere (herbivorous relative of hippos) with a thick, tubular snout.	
Leptauchenia	L. major	Arikareean	Canyon Ferry	A leptaucheniine oreodont (a sheep-like relative of camels).	
Leptochoerus	L. sp.	Chadronian	Canyon Ferry	A leptochoerid	
Leptomeryx	L. evansi	Chadronian	Canyon Ferry, Dunbar Creek	A leptomerycid (early ruminant)	
Leptomeryx	L. aff. L. evansi	Chadronian - Orellan	Douglass Creek beds, Dunbar Creek (Easter Lily l.f.), Cook Ranch (Cook Ranch and Matador Ranch l.f.)	A leptomerycid (early ruminant)	
Leptomeryx	"L." mammifer	Chadronian	Climbing Arrow (Pipestone Springs and Little Pipestone Creek l.f.)	A leptomerycid (early ruminant)	
Leptomeryx	"L." speciosus	Chadronian	Climbing Arrow (Pipestone Springs l.f.), Dunbar Creek, Cook Ranch	A leptomerycid (early ruminant)	
Leptomeryx	L. aff. L. speciosus	Chadronian	McCarty's Mountain l.f.	A leptomerycid (early ruminant)	
Leptomeryx	L. transmontanus	Chadronian	Canyon Ferry	A leptomerycid (early ruminant)	
Leptomeryx	L. cf. yoderi	Chadronian	Climbing Arrow	A leptomerycid (early ruminant)	
Leptomeryx	L. sp.	Chadronian	Douglass Creek beds, Climbing Arrow (Pipestone Springs and Little Pipestone Creek l.f.), Dunbar Creek (Easter Lily l.f.)	A leptomerycid (early ruminant)	
Leptoreodon	L. marshi	Uintan	Dell beds	A leptotraguline protoceratid (a deer-like relatives of camels)	
Limnenetes	L. platyceps	Chadronian	McCarty's Mountain l.f., Climbing Arrow	A leptaucheniine oreodont (a sheep-like relative of camels).	
Megoreodon	M. sp.	Arikareean	middle Cabbage Patch beds	A very large promerycochoerine oreodont (a sheep-like relative of camels).	
Merycoidodon	M. cf. M. culbertsoni	Chadronian - Orellan	Dunbar Creek (Easter Lily l.f.), Cook Ranch (Cook Ranch l.f.)	A merycoidodontine oreodont (a sheep-like relative of camels).	
Merycoidodon	M. sp.	Chadronian	Climbing Arrow (Pipestone Springs and Little Pipestone Creek l.f.), Canyon Ferry	A merycoidodontine oreodont (a sheep-like relative of camels).	
Mesoreodon	M. chelonyx	Arikareean	Canyon Ferry	A merycoidodontine oreodont	
Mesoreodon	M. minor	Arikareean	lower Cabbage Patch beds	A merycoidodontine oreodont. Synonyms of this species include (but are not limited to) Promerycochoerus minor, Eporeodon cheeki, and Desmatochoerus macrosynaphus.	
Miniochoerus?	M.? sp.	Orellan	Cook Ranch (Cook Ranch l.f.)	A miniochoerine oreodont (a sheep-like relative of camels).	
Montanatylopus	M. matthewi	Chadronian	McCarty's Mountain l.f.	An oromerycid (short-necked camel relative)	
Oreonetes	O. anceps	Chadronian	McCarty's Mountain l.f., Climbing Arrow	An oreonetine oreodont (a sheep-like relative of camels).	
Oreonetes	O. douglassi	Chadronian	McCarty's Mountain l.f.,	An oreonetine oreodont (a sheep-like relative of camels).	
Paratylopus	P.? sp.	Chadronian	McCarty's Mountain l.f.	An early camelid (camel and llama relative).	
Pentacemylus	P. leotensis	Uintan	Dell beds	A dichobunid	
Pipestoneia	P. douglassi	Chadronian	Climbing Arrow (Pipestone Springs l.f.)	A possible leptomerycid	
Poebrotherium	P. cf. P. eximium	Chadronian	Canyon Ferry	An early camelid (camel and llama relative).	
Poebrotherium	P. sp.	Chadronian - Orellan	Climbing Arrow (Pipestone Springs and Little Pipestone Creek l.f.), Cook Ranch (Cook Ranch and Matador Ranch l.f.)	An early camelid (camel and llama relative).	
Promerycochoerus	P. barbouri	Arikareean	Blacktail Deer Creek	A promerycochoerine oreodont (a sheep-like relative of camels).	
Promerycochoerus	P. montanus	Arikareean	Canyon Ferry	A promerycochoerine oreodont (a sheep-like relative of camels).	
Pronodens	P. transmontanus	Arikareean	lower Cabbage Patch beds	A leptomerycid (a small hornless deer-like ruminant).	
Protoreodon	P. minimus	Chadronian	McCarty's Mountain l.f., Climbing Arrow	An agriochoerid (climbing relative of oreodonts)	
Protoreodon	P. pumilus	Uintan - Duchesnean	Dell beds, Climbing Arrow (Shoddy Springs l.f.)	An agriochoerid (climbing relative of oreodonts)	
Stibarus	S. montanus	Chadronian	Climbing Arrow (Pipestone Springs and Little Pipestone Creek l.f.)	A leptochoerid	
Trigenicus	T. profectus	Chadronian	Climbing Arrow (Pipestone Springs and Little Pipestone Creek l.f.), Cook Ranch	A leptotraguline protoceratid (a deer-like relatives of camels)	

=== Carnivora ===
Indeterminate mustelids (weasel family mammals) and cat-like mammals are also reported from the Cabbage Patch beds. Indeterminate amphicyonids ("bear-dogs") are reported from the Climbing Arrow Member (Diamond O Ranch l.f.).

Carnivorans of the Renova Formation
Genus / Taxon	Species	NALMA	Strata	Notes	Images
Archaeocyon	A. leptodus	Arikareean	lower-middle Cabbage Patch beds, Canyon Ferry	A small borophagine canid ("bone-crushing dog")	
Brachyrhynchocyon	B. dodgei	Chadronian	Climbing Arrow (Pipestone Springs and Little Pipestone Creek l.f.), Canyon Ferry, Cook Ranch	A daphoenine amphicyonid ("bear-dog")	
Cynodesmus	C. thooides	Arikareean	lower-middle Cabbage Patch beds	A coyote-sized hesperocyonine canid (early dog relative).	
Daphoenictis	D. tedfordi	Chadronian	Climbing Arrow (Pipestone Springs l.f.)	A daphoenine amphicyonid ("bear-dog")	
Daphoenictis	cf. D. sp.	Chadronian	McCarty's Mountain l.f.	A daphoenine amphicyonid ("bear-dog")	
Dinictis	D. sp.	Chadronian	Climbing Arrow (Pipestone Springs l.f.)	A nimravid ("false saber-toothed cat")	
Enhydrocyon	E. basilatus	Arikareean	Canyon Ferry	A robust hesperocyonine canid (early dog relative).	
Hesperocyon	H. gregarius	Chadronian - Orellan	Climbing Arrow (Pipestone Springs and Little Pipestone Creek l.f.), Cook Ranch (Cook Ranch and Matador Ranch l.f.), Dunbar Creek, Canyon Ferry	A small early hesperocyonine canid (early dog relative).	
Hesperocyon	H. sp.	Chadronian - Orellan	Douglass Creek beds, Climbing Arrow (Diamond O Ranch l.f.), McCarty's Mountain l.f., Dunbar Creek (Easter Lily l.f.)	A small early hesperocyonine canid (early dog relative).	
Leptocyon	L. cf. L. delicatus	Arikareean	middle Cabbage Patch beds	A fox-like early canine canid (dog relative)	
Lycophocyon	L. tabrumi	Uintan	Dell beds	An early caniform	
"Miacis"	"M." sp.	Chadronian	Climbing Arrow (Diamond O Ranch l.f.), McCarty's Mountain l.f.	Indeterminate miacids or other small early carnivorans.	
Mustelavus	M. priscus	Chadronian	Climbing Arrow (Pipestone Springs l.f.)	A possible early mustelid	
Palaeogale	P. sectoria	Chadronian - Orellan	Climbing Arrow (Pipestone Springs l.f.), Cook Ranch (Cook Ranch l.f.)	An enigmatic probable feliform with a mustelid-like skull.	
Subparictis	S. montanus	Chadronian	Douglass Creek beds, Climbing Arrow (Pipestone Springs and Little Pipestone Creek l.f.)	A subparictid (early raccoon-like bear relative)	
Tapocyon	T. robustus	Uintan	Dell beds	An early miacid-grade carnivoramorph	

=== Chiroptera ===
Indeterminate vespertilionids (vesper bats) are reported from the Cook Ranch Member (Cook Ranch l.f.).

=== Eulipotyphla ===
Indeterminate talpids (moles and kin) are reported from the Cook Ranch Member (Cook Ranch l.f.), Cabbage Patch beds, and Canyon Ferry area. Indeterminate shrews are reported from the Cook Ranch Member (Matador Ranch l.f.). Indeterminate proscalopids are reported from the Climbing Arrow Member (Diamond O Ranch l.f.).

Eulipotyphlans of the Renova Formation
Genus / Taxon	Species	NALMA	Strata	Notes	Images
Amphechinus	A. horncloudi	Arikareean	middle-upper Cabbage Patch beds	An erinaceine (hedgehog)	
Apternodus	A. baladontus	Chadronian	Climbing Arrow (Diamond O Ranch l.f., Little Pipestone Creek l.f.), McCarty's Mountain l.f.	An apternodontid	
Apternodus	A. mediaevus	Chadronian	Douglass Creek beds, Climbing Arrow (Pipestone Springs and Little Pipestone Creek l.f.), Dunbar Creek (Easter Lily l.f.), Canyon Ferry	An apternodontid	
Apternodus	A. sp. A. mediaevus	Chadronian	McCarty's Mountain l.f.	An apternodontid	
Centetodon	C. kuenzii	Duchesnean - Orellan	Climbing Arrow (Shoddy Springs, Pipestone Springs, and Little Pipestone Creek l.f.), Dunbar Creek (Easter Lily l.f.)	A geolabidid	
Centetodon	C. cf. C. kuenzii	Chadronian	Climbing Arrow (Diamond O Ranch l.f.)	A geolabidid	
Centetodon	C. magnus	Chadronian	McCarty's Mountain l.f.	A geolabidid	
Centetodon	C. cf. C. magnus	Uintan	Dell beds	A geolabidid	
Cryptoryctes	C. kayi	Chadronian	Climbing Arrow (Diamond O Ranch, Pipestone Springs, and Little Pipestone Creek l.f.)	A species based on a eulipotyphlan humerus, probably belonging to Micropternodus.	
Domnina	D. hutchisoni	Arikareean	lower Cabbage Patch beds	A heterosoricine shrew	
Domnina	D. cf. D. gradata	Chadronian - Orellan	Climbing Arrow, Cook Ranch (Cook Ranch l.f.)	A heterosoricine shrew	
Domnina	D. sagittariensis	Chadronian	Climbing Arrow (Pipestone Springs l.f.)	A heterosoricine shrew	
Domnina	D. thompsoni	Chadronian	Climbing Arrow (Diamond O Ranch, Pipestone Springs, and Little Pipestone Creek l.f.), Dunbar Creek	A heterosoricine shrew	
Domnina	D. sp.	Duchesnean	Climbing Arrow (Shoddy Springs l.f.)	A heterosoricine shrew	
Micropternodus	M. borealis	Chadronian	Climbing Arrow (Pipestone Springs and Little Pipestone Creek l.f.), Canyon Ferry, Dunbar Creek	A micropternodontid	
Micropternodus	M. sp.	Chadronian	McCarty's Mountain l.f.	A micropternodontid	
Mystipterus	M. sp.	Arikareean	lower-middle Cabbage Patch beds	A uropsiline (shrew mole)	
Ocajila	O. macdonaldi	Whitneyan - Arikareean	White Hills, Blacktail Deer Creek	An erinaceid, possibly a galericine (gymnure, related to hedgehogs)	
Ocajila	O. sp.	Orellan	Cook Ranch (Cook Ranch l.f.)	An erinaceid, possibly a galericine (gymnure, related to hedgehogs)	
Ocajila	O. rasmusseni	Arikareean	lower-middle Cabbage Patch beds	An erinaceid, possibly a galericine (gymnure, related to hedgehogs)	
Oligoryctes	O. altitalonidus	Chadronian - Orellan	Climbing Arrow (Diamond O Ranch, Pipestone Springs, and Little Pipestone Creek l.f.), Cook Ranch (Cook Ranch l.f.)	An oligoryctid	
Oligoryctes	O. cameronensis	Chadronian	Climbing Arrow (Pipestone Springs and Little Pipestone Creek l.f.)	An oligoryctid	
Oligoscalops	O. sp.	Orellan	Cook Ranch (Cook Ranch and Matador Ranch l.f.)	A proscalopid (an extinct mole-like mammal)	
Oreotalpa	cf. O. florissantensis	Chadronian	Climbing Arrow (Pipestone Springs l.f.)	A talpid (mole), one of the oldest moles in North America.	
Parvericius	P. montanus	Arikareean	middle Cabbage Patch beds	An erinaceine (hedgehog)	
Proscalops	P. sp.	Arikareean	middle-upper Cabbage Patch beds	A proscalopid (an extinct mole-like mammal)	
Pseudotrimylus	P. sp.	Arikareean	lower Cabbage Patch beds	A heterosoricine shrew	
Stenoechinus	S. tantalus	Arikareean	middle-upper Cabbage Patch beds	An erinaceine (hedgehog)	

=== Hyaenodonta ===
Hyaenodonts of the Renova Formation
Genus / Taxon	Species	NALMA	Strata	Notes	Images
Hyaenodon	H. crucians	Chadronian	Climbing Arrow (Pipestone Springs and Little Pipestone Creek l.f.)	A hyaenodontid	
Hyaenodon	H. microdon	Chadronian	Climbing Arrow (Pipestone Springs l.f.)	A hyaenodontid	
Hyaenodon	H. sp.	Chadronian	Climbing Arrow (Diamond O Ranch l.f.), McCarty's Mountain l.f.	A hyaenodontid	

=== Lagomorpha ===
Lagomorphs of the Renova Formation
Genus / Taxon	Species	NALMA	Strata	Notes	Images
Archaeolagus	A. cf. A. macrocephalus	Arikareean	middle Cabbage Patch beds, Canyon Ferry	An "archaeolagine" (early rabbit-like mammal)	
Chadrolagus	C. emryi	Chadronian	McCarty's Mountain l.f., Dunbar Creek, Cook Ranch	A basal lagomorph	
Chadrolagus	C. sp.	Chadronian	Climbing Arrow (Pipestone Springs and Little Pipestone Creek l.f.)	A basal lagomorph	
Desmatolagus?	D.? cf. D.schizopetrus	Arikareean	lower-middle Cabbage Patch beds	An early ochotonid (pika)	
Gripholagomys?	G.? sp.	Arikareean	upper Cabbage Patch beds	An early ochotonid (pika)	
Megalagus	M. brachyodon	Chadronian	Climbing Arrow (Pipestone Springs and Little Pipestone Creek l.f.), Dunbar Creek (Easter Lily l.f.), Canyon Ferry	A "palaeolagine" (early rabbit-like mammal)	
Megalagus	M. cf. M. turgidus	Orellan	Cook Ranch (Cook Ranch l.f.)	A "palaeolagine" (early rabbit-like mammal)	
Megalagus	M. sp.	Chadronian - Arikareean	McCarty's Mountain l.f., lower Cabbage Patch beds	A "palaeolagine" (early rabbit-like mammal)	
Mytonolagus	M. ashcrafti	Chadronian	Climbing Arrow (Diamond O Ranch l.f.)	A leporid (rabbit)	
Mytonolagus	M. cf. M. wyomingensis	Uintan	Dell beds	A leporid (rabbit)	
Mytonolagus	M.? sp.	Uintan - Duchesnean	Climbing Arrow (Shoddy Springs l.f.)	A leporid (rabbit)	
Palaeolagus	"P." burkei	Orellan	Dunbar Creek (Easter Lily l.f.), Cook Ranch (Cook Ranch and Matador Ranch l.f.), Canyon Ferry	A "palaeolagine" (early rabbit-like mammal)	
Palaeolagus	P. haydeni	Chadronian - Orellan	Dunbar Creek (Easter Lily l.f.)	A "palaeolagine" (early rabbit-like mammal)	
Palaeolagus	P. cf. P. haydeni	Orellan	Cook Ranch (Cook Ranch l.f.)	A "palaeolagine" (early rabbit-like mammal)	
Palaeolagus	"P." intermedius	Orellan	Dunbar Creek (Easter Lily l.f.), Canyon Ferry	A "palaeolagine" (early rabbit-like mammal)	
Palaeolagus	P. temnodon	Chadronian	Climbing Arrow (Pipestone Springs and Little Pipestone Creek l.f.), Dunbar Creek (Easter Lily l.f.), Canyon Ferry, Cook Ranch	A "palaeolagine" (early rabbit-like mammal)	
Palaeolagus	P. sp.	Chadronian - Arikareean	Climbing Arrow (Diamond O Ranch l.f.), McCarty's Mountain l.f., Cook Ranch (Matador Ranch l.f.), lower Cabbage Patch beds	A "palaeolagine" (early rabbit-like mammal)	

=== Leptictida ===
Leptictidans of the Renova Formation
Genus / Taxon	Species	NALMA	Strata	Notes	Images
Leptictis	L. acutidens	Chadronian	Climbing Arrow (Pipestone Springs and Little Pipestone Creek l.f.), Canyon Ferry	A leptictid (hopping insectivore)	
Leptictis	L. intermedius	Chadronian	Climbing Arrow (Diamond O Ranch l.f.), McCarty's Mountain l.f.	A leptictid (hopping insectivore)	
Leptictis	L. major	Chadronian	McCarty's Mountain l.f.	A leptictid (hopping insectivore)	
Leptictis	L. montanus	Chadronian	McCarty's Mountain l.f.	A leptictid (hopping insectivore)	
Leptictis	L. tenuis	Chadronian	McCarty's Mountain l.f.	A leptictid (hopping insectivore)	
Leptictis	L. sp.	Chadronian	Dunbar Creek	A leptictid (hopping insectivore)	
Stenoleptictis	S. thomsoni	Chadronian	Climbing Arrow (Pipestone Springs l.f.), McCarty's Mountain l.f.	A leptictid (hopping insectivore)	

=== Metatheria ===
Metatherians of the Renova Formation
Genus / Taxon	Species	NALMA	Strata	Notes	Images
Copedelphys	C. cf. C. stevensoni	Orellan	Cook Ranch (Cook Ranch and Matador Ranch l.f.)	A herpetotheriid (opossum-like relative of marsupials)	
Copedelphys	C. titanelix	Chadronian - Orellan	Climbing Arrow (Pipestone Springs and Little Pipestone Creek l.f.), Dunbar Creek (Easter Lily l.f.)	A herpetotheriid (opossum-like relative of marsupials)	
Copedelphys	C. cf. C. titanelix	Chadronian	McCarty's Mountain l.f.	A herpetotheriid (opossum-like relative of marsupials)	
Copedelphys	C. sp.	Chadronian	Climbing Arrow (Diamond O Ranch l.f.)	A herpetotheriid (opossum-like relative of marsupials)	
Didelphidectes	D. pumilis	Chadronian	Climbing Arrow (Pipestone Springs and Little Pipestone Creek l.f.)	A peradectid (opossum-like relative of marsupials)	
Herpetotherium	H. fugax	Orellan	Dunbar Creek (Easter Lily l.f.), Cook Ranch (Cook Ranch and Matador Ranch l.f.), Canyon Ferry	A herpetotheriid (opossum-like relative of marsupials)	
Herpetotherium	H. cf. H. fugax	Arikareean	middle-upper Cabbage Patch beds	A herpetotheriid (opossum-like relative of marsupials)	
Herpetotherium	H. knighti	Uintan	Dell beds	A herpetotheriid (opossum-like relative of marsupials)	
Herpetotherium	H. cf. H. merriami	Arikareean	lower Cabbage Patch beds	A herpetotheriid (opossum-like relative of marsupials)	
Herpetotherium	H. valens	Chadronian - Orellan	Climbing Arrow (Diamond O Ranch and Pipestone Springs l.f.), McCarty's Mountain l.f., Dunbar Creek (Easter Lily l.f.)	A herpetotheriid (opossum-like relative of marsupials)	
Herpetotherium	H. cf. H. valens	Arikareean	middle-upper Cabbage Patch beds	A herpetotheriid (opossum-like relative of marsupials)	
Herpetotherium	H. tabrumi	Chadronian	Climbing Arrow (Pipestone Springs l.f.)	A herpetotheriid (opossum-like relative of marsupials)	
Nanodelphys	N. hunti	Orellan	Cook Ranch (Cook Ranch l.f.)	A peradectid (opossum-like relative of marsupials)	
Nanodelphys	N. sp.	Arikareean	lower-middle Cabbage Patch beds	A peradectid (opossum-like relative of marsupials)	

=== Perissodactyla ===
Indeterminate brontotheres are known from the Dell beds, Douglass Creek beds, Climbing Arrow Member, McCarty's Mountain l.f., Dunbar Creek Member, and Canyon Ferry area. Indeterminate rhinocerotids (rhinos) are also common throughout the Renova Formation and equivalent strata. An indeterminate amynodontid rhino is known from the Dell beds.

Perissodactyls of the Renova Formation
Genus / Taxon	Species	NALMA	Strata	Notes	Images
Colodon	C. cingulatus	Chadronian	Climbing Arrow (Diamond O Ranch l.f.), McCarty's Mountain l.f.	A helaletid (early tapir relative)	
Colodon	C. kayi	Uintan	Dell beds	A helaletid (early tapir relative)	
Colodon	C. cf. kayi	Chadronian	Climbing Arrow (Pipestone Springs l.f.)	A helaletid (early tapir relative)	
Colodon	C. woodi	Uintan	Dell beds	A helaletid (early tapir relative)	
Diceratherium	D. annectens	Arikareean	lower Cabbage Patch beds	A medium-sized "diceratheriine" rhino	
Diceratherium	D. armatum	Arikareean	lower-middle Cabbage Patch beds	A large "diceratheriine" rhino	
Diceratherium	D. radtkei	Arikareean	lower-middle Cabbage Patch beds	A very large "diceratheriine" rhino	
Eotitanops	E. borealis	Bridgerian	Sage Creek	An early brontothere	
Epihippus	E. uintensis	Uintan	Dell beds	An early equid (horse relative)	
Helaletes	H. nanus	Bridgerian	Sage Creek	A helaletid (early tapir relative)	
Heteraletes	H. leotanus	Uintan - Duchesnean	Dell beds, Climbing Arrow (Shoddy Springs l.f.)	A tapiroid (tapir relative)	
Hyrachyus	H. douglassi	Bridgerian	Sage Creek	A small rhinocerotoid (rhino relative)	
Hyracodon	H. sp.	Chadronian - Orellan	Climbing Arrow (Diamond O Ranch and Pipestone Springs l.f.), McCarty's Mountain l.f., Dunbar Creek (Easter Lily l.f.), Cook Ranch (Cook Ranch and Matador Ranch l.f.), Canyon Ferry	A hyracodontid ("running rhino")	
Merychippus	M. sp.	Hemingfordian	Canyon Ferry	An early grazing equid (horse)	
Mesohippus	M. bairdi	Chadronian - Orellan	Dunbar Creek (Easter Lily l.f.)	An anchitheriine equid (early three-toed horse)	
Mesohippus	M. latidens	Chadronian	Climbing Arrow	An anchitheriine equid (early three-toed horse)	
Mesohippus	M. portentus	Chadronian	Climbing Arrow (Pipestone Springs l.f.)	An anchitheriine equid (early three-toed horse)	
Mesohippus	M. westoni	Chadronian	Climbing Arrow (Pipestone Springs and Little Pipestone Creek l.f.)	An anchitheriine equid (early three-toed horse)	
Mesohippus	M. sp.	Chadronian - Orellan	Douglass Creek beds, Climbing Arrow (Diamond O Ranch l.f.), McCarty's Mountain l.f., Dunbar Creek, Cook Ranch (Cook Ranch and Matador Ranch l.f.), Canyon Ferry	An anchitheriine equid (early three-toed horse)	
Miohippus	M. grandis	Chadronian	Climbing Arrow (Pipestone Springs and Little Pipestone Creek l.f.)	An anchitheriine equid (early three-toed horse) with a versatile diet	
Miohippus	M. obliquidens	Chadronian - Orellan	Dunbar Creek (Easter Lily l.f.)	An anchitheriine equid (early three-toed horse) with a versatile diet	
Miohippus	M. sp.	Arikareean	middle Cabbage Patch beds	An anchitheriine equid (early three-toed horse) with a versatile diet	
Palaeosyops	P. fontinalis	Bridgerian	Sage Creek	A broad-skulled brontothere	
Palaeosyops	P. paludosus	Bridgerian	Sage Creek	A broad-skulled brontothere	
Penetrigonias	P. dakotensis	Chadronian	McCarty's Mountain l.f.	A "diceratheriine" rhino	
Schizotheroides	S. parvus	Uintan	Dell beds	An enigmatic perissodactyl	
Skinneroceras	S. manningi	Arikareean	lower Cabbage Patch beds	A very small "diceratheriine" rhino	
Subhyracodon	S. mitis	Chadronian	Climbing Arrow (Pipestone Springs l.f.)	An early hornless rhino	
Subhyracodon	S. cf. S. mitis	Chadronian	Douglass Creek beds, Canyon Ferry	An early hornless rhino	
Subhyracodon	S. sp.	Orellan	Cook Ranch (Cook Ranch l.f.)	An early hornless rhino	
Trigonias	T. osborni	Chadronian	Climbing Arrow (Pipestone Springs l.f.)	An early hornless rhino	
Trigonias	T. cf. T. osborni	Chadronian	Dunbar Creek (Easter Lily l.f.)	An early hornless rhino	
Triplopides	T. rieli	Chadronian	McCarty's Mountain l.f.	A hyracodontid ("running rhino")	
Triplopus	T. cf. T. rhinocerinus	Uintan	Dell beds	A possible hyracodontid ("running rhino")	

=== Pholidotamorpha ===
Pholidotamorphs of the Renova Formation
Genus / Taxon	Species	NALMA	Strata	Notes	Images
Epoicotherium	E. unicum	Chadronian	McCarty's Mountain l.f.	An epoicotheriid palaeanodont (mole-like relative of pangolins)	
Epoicotherium	E. cf. E. unicum	Chadronian	Climbing Arrow (Diamond O Ranch l.f.)	An epoicotheriid palaeanodont (mole-like relative of pangolins)	
Epoicotherium	E. sp.	Uintan	Dell beds	An epoicotheriid palaeanodont (mole-like relative of pangolins)	
Patriomanis	P. americanus	Chadronian	Climbing Arrow?	An early pangolin, exact strata uncertain.	

=== Rodentia ===
Indeterminate aplodontiids (relatives of the mountain beaver), castorids (beavers), eomyids (extinct squirrel-like rodents), eutypomyids (extinct beaver-like rodents), sciurids (squirrels), sminthids (birch mice), and zapodids (jumping mice) are also known from the Cabbage Patch beds.

Indeterminate aplodontiids are known from the Douglass Creek beds. Indeterminate cylindrodontids, eomyids, and paramyids are known from the Climbing Arrow Member (Shoddy Springs local fauna).

Rodents of the Renova Formation
Genus / Taxon	Species	NALMA	Strata	Notes	Images
Adjidaumo	A. lophatus	Chadronian	Dunbar Creek	An eomyid (an extinct squirrel-like rodent)	
Adjidaumo	A. minimus	Chadronian - Orellan	Climbing Arrow (Diamond O Ranch, Pipestone Springs, and Little Pipestone Creek l.f.), Cook Ranch (Cook Ranch l.f.)	An eomyid (an extinct squirrel-like rodent)	
Adjidaumo	A. cf. A. minimus	Orellan	Cook Ranch (Matador Ranch l.f.)	An eomyid (an extinct squirrel-like rodent)	
Agnotocastor	A. cf. A. praetereadens	Orellan	Cook Ranch (Cook Ranch l.f.)	An early burrowing castorid (beaver)	
Agnotocastor	A. sp.	Arikareean	lower Cabbage Patch beds	An early burrowing castorid (beaver)	
Allomys?	A. magnus?	Arikareean	lower-upper Cabbage Patch beds	An "allomyine" aplodontiid (relative of the mountain beaver). The Cabbage Patch allomyine may be conspecific with Allomys magnus (formerly known as Alwoodia magna).	
Altasciurus	A. cf. albiclivus	Orellan	Dunbar Creek	A prosciurine aplodontiid (relative of the mountain beaver). Previously considered species of Prosciurus.	
Altasciurus	A. relictus	Orellan - Whitneyan	Dunbar Creek (Easter Lily l.f.), White Hills, Canyon Ferry	A prosciurine aplodontiid (relative of the mountain beaver). Previously considered species of Prosciurus.	
Altasciurus	A. sp.	Orellan	Dunbar Creek	A prosciurine aplodontiid (relative of the mountain beaver). Previously considered species of Prosciurus.	
Ansomys	A. nexodens	Orellan	Dunbar Creek	An early aplodontiid (relative of the mountain beaver)	
Ardynomys	A. occidentalis	Chadronian	Climbing Arrow (Diamond O Ranch l.f.), McCarty's Mountain l.f.	A cylindrodontid	
Aulolithomys	A. bounites	Chadronian	Climbing Arrow (Pipestone Springs and Little Pipestone Creek l.f.)	An eomyid (an extinct squirrel-like rodent)	
Aulolithomys	A. vexilliames	Chadronian	Climbing Arrow (Diamond O Ranch l.f.)	An eomyid (an extinct squirrel-like rodent)	
Brachygaulus	B. leistneri	Orellan	Cook Ranch (Matador Ranch l.f.)	An early aplodontoid (relative of the mountain beaver)	
Brachygaulus	B. nicholsi	Orellan	Cook Ranch (Cook Ranch l.f.)	An early aplodontoid (relative of the mountain beaver)	
Brachygaulus	B. sp.	Orellan	Cook Ranch (Cook Ranch l.f.)	An early aplodontoid (relative of the mountain beaver)	
Brachygaulus	B. xerobothrus	Orellan	Dunbar Creek	An early aplodontoid (relative of the mountain beaver)	
Capacikala	C. gradatus	Arikareean	Canyon Ferry	An early castorid (beaver)	
Capatanka?	C.? sp.	Arikareean	middle Cabbage Patch beds	An early burrowing castorid (beaver)	
Cylindrodon	C. fontis	Chadronian	Climbing Arrow (Pipestone Springs and Little Pipestone Creek l.f.)	A cylindrodontid	
Cylindrodon	C. cf. C. fontis	Chadronian	McCarty's Mountain l.f.	A cylindrodontid	
Dakotallomys	D. whitei	Orellan	Dunbar Creek	An early aplodontiid (relative of the mountain beaver)	
Disallomys	D. intermedius	Orellan	Cook Ranch (Cook Ranch and Matador Ranch l.f.)	An early aplodontiid (relative of the mountain beaver)	
Dolocylindrodon	D. farkei	Uintan	Dell beds	A cylindrodontid	
Dolocylindrodon	D. medius	Chadronian	McCarty's Mountain l.f.	A cylindrodontid	
Dolocylindrodon	D. rahnensis	Chadronian	Climbing Arrow	A cylindrodontid	
Dolocylindrodon	D. vukae	Chadronian	Climbing Arrow	A cylindrodontid	
Douglassciurus	D. jeffersoni	Chadronian	Climbing Arrow (Pipestone Springs l.f.)	An early sciurin (tree squirrel).	
Downsimus	D. montanus	Arikareean	lower Cabbage Patch beds	An early aplodontiid (relative of the mountain beaver)	
Euhapsis?	E.? sp.	Arikareean	upper Cabbage Patch beds	An early burrowing castorid (beaver)	
Eumys	E. cf. E. brachyodus	Whitneyan	White Hills	A eumyine cricetid (early relative of voles, hamsters, and New World mice and rats)	
Eumys	E. cf. E. cricetodontoides	Orellan	Dunbar Creek (Easter Lily l.f.), Cook Ranch (Cook Ranch l.f.), Canyon Ferry	A eumyine cricetid (early relative of voles, hamsters, and New World mice and rats)	
Eumys	E. elegans	Orellan	Dunbar Creek	A eumyine cricetid (early relative of voles, hamsters, and New World mice and rats)	
Eumys	E. cf. E. obliquidens	Orellan	Dunbar Creek (Easter Lily l.f.)	A eumyine cricetid (early relative of voles, hamsters, and New World mice and rats)	
Eumys	E. sp.	Orellan	Cook Ranch (Matador Ranch l.f.)	A eumyine cricetid (early relative of voles, hamsters, and New World mice and rats)	
Eutypomys	E. parvus	Chadronian	Climbing Arrow (Pipestone Springs l.f.)	A eutypomyid (an extinct beaver-like rodent)	
Eutypomys	E. cf. E. parvus	Chadronian	Climbing Arrow (Diamond O Ranch l.f.)	A eutypomyid (an extinct beaver-like rodent)	
Eutypomys	E. montanensis	Arikareean	lower-upper Cabbage Patch beds	A eutypomyid (an extinct beaver-like rodent)	
Eutypomys	E. thompsoni	Chadronian	Climbing Arrow	A eutypomyid (an extinct beaver-like rodent)	
Gregorymys	G. douglassi	Arikareean	upper Cabbage Patch beds	An entoptychine geomyid (gopher).	
Gregorymys	G. cf. G. kayi	Arikareean	upper Cabbage Patch beds	An entoptychine geomyid (gopher).	
Gregorymys	G. montanensis	Arikareean	Blacktail Deer Creek	An entoptychine geomyid (gopher).	
Gregorymys	G. tavenneri	Arikareean	upper Cabbage Patch beds	An entoptychine geomyid (gopher).	
Heliscomys	H. gregoryi	Orellan - Whitneyan	Cook Ranch (Cook Ranch l.f.), White Hills	A heliscomyid.	
Heliscomys	H. ostranderi	Chadronian	Climbing Arrow (Pipestone Springs l.f.)	A heliscomyid.	
Heliscomys	H. cf. H. ostranderi	Chadronian	McCarty's Mountain l.f.	A heliscomyid.	
Heliscomys	H. sp.	Orellan	Cook Ranch (Matador Ranch l.f.)	A heliscomyid.	
Heosminthus	H. teredens	Arikareean	lower-upper Cabbage Patch beds	A terrestrial sminthid (birch mouse) related to species from Asia.	
Hesperopetes	H. sp.	Chadronian	Climbing Arrow (Pipestone Springs l.f.)	An early squirrel	
Ischyromys	I. douglassi	Chadronian	McCarty's Mountain l.f., Climbing Arrow	An ischyromyine ischyromyid.	
Ischyromys	I. cf. I. douglassi	Uintan	Dell beds	An ischyromyine ischyromyid.	
Ischyromys	I. sp.	Chadronian - Orellan	Douglass Creek beds, Climbing Arrow (Diamond O Ranch, Pipestone Springs, and Little Pipestone Creek l.f.), Dunbar Creek (Easter Lily l.f.), Cook Ranch (Cook Ranch l.f.)	An ischyromyine ischyromyid.	
Ischyromys	I. veterior	Chadronian	Climbing Arrow (Pipestone Springs and Little Pipestone Creek l.f.), Dunbar Creek (Easter Lily l.f.), Canyon Ferry	An ischyromyine ischyromyid.	
Leidymys	L. alicae	Arikareean	middle-upper Cabbage Patch beds	A eucricetodontine cricetid (early relative of voles, hamsters, and New World mice and rats)	
Leidymys	L. sp.	Arikareean	lower-upper Cabbage Patch beds	A eucricetodontine cricetid (early relative of voles, hamsters, and New World mice and rats)	
Leptodontomys	L. douglassi	Whitneyan - Arikareean	White Hills, lower-middle Cabbage Patch beds	An eomyid (an extinct squirrel-like rodent)	
Lophicylindrodon	L. expiratus	Whitneyan	White Hills	A cylindrodontid	
Megaheliscomys	M. mcgrewi	Orellan	Cook Ranch (Cook Ranch l.f.)	A heliscomyid.	
Meniscomys	M. fronseei	Arikareean	lower-upper Cabbage Patch beds	A "meniscomyine" aplodontiid (relative of the mountain beaver)	
Metadjidaumo	M. woodi	Orellan	Cook Ranch (Cook Ranch l.f.)	An eomyid (an extinct squirrel-like rodent)	
Metanoiamys	M. norejkoi	Chadronian	Climbing Arrow (Diamond O Ranch l.f.)	An eomyid (an extinct squirrel-like rodent)	
Microtheriomys	M. articulaquaticus	Arikareean	lower-middle Cabbage Patch beds	An anchitheriomyine castorid (beaver), the oldest semi-aquatic rodent in North America and the oldest species of semi-aquatic beaver in the world. Multiple Microtheriomys species may have been present in the Cabbage Patch beds.	
Miosciurus	M. cf. M. ballovianus	Arikareean	lower Cabbage Patch beds	A sciurin (tree squirrel)	
Montanacastor	M. simplicidens	Whitneyan	White Hills	An early castorid (beaver)	
Montanamus	M. bjorki	Chadronian	Climbing Arrow (Pipestone Springs l.f.)	An eomyid (an extinct squirrel-like rodent)	
Mookomys	M. sp.	Arikareean	middle-upper Cabbage Patch beds	An early heteromyid (relative of kangaroo rats).	
Namatomys	N. lloydi	Chadronian	Climbing Arrow (Pipestone Springs l.f.)	An eomyid (an extinct squirrel-like rodent)	
Neatocastor	N. hesperus	Arikareean	middle-upper Cabbage Patch beds, Blacktail Deer Creek	An early castorid (beaver)	
Niglarodon	N. koerneri	Arikareean	lower Cabbage Patch beds	A "meniscomyine" aplodontiid (relative of the mountain beaver)	
Niglarodon	N. konizeskii	Arikareean	lower Cabbage Patch beds	A "meniscomyine" aplodontiid (relative of the mountain beaver)	
Niglarodon	N. pardeei	Arikareean	lower-middle Cabbage Patch beds	A "meniscomyine" aplodontiid (relative of the mountain beaver)	
Niglarodon	N. sp.	Arikareean	lower-upper Cabbage Patch beds	A "meniscomyine" aplodontiid (relative of the mountain beaver)	
Ninamys	N. annectens	Orellan	Cook Ranch (Cook Ranch l.f.)	An early aplodontiid (relative of the mountain beaver)	
Orelladjidaumo	O. exiguus	Whitneyan	White Hills	An eomyid (an extinct squirrel-like rodent)	
Paciculus	P. sp.	Arikareean	middle-upper Cabbage Patch beds	A eucricetodontine cricetid (early relative of voles, hamsters, and New World mice and rats)	
Palaeocastor	P. sp.	Arikareean	upper Cabbage Patch beds	An early burrowing castorid (beaver)	
Paradjidaumo	P. disjunctus	Chadronian	Climbing Arrow (Diamond O Ranch l.f.), McCarty's Mountain l.f.	An eomyid (an extinct squirrel-like rodent)	
Paradjidaumo	P. nanus	Chadronian	Climbing Arrow (Diamond O Ranch l.f.), McCarty's Mountain l.f.	An eomyid (an extinct squirrel-like rodent)	
Paradjidaumo	P. spokanensis	Orellan	Dunbar Creek, Canyon Ferry	An eomyid (an extinct squirrel-like rodent)	
Paradjidaumo	P. trilophus	Chadronian	Douglass Creek beds, Climbing Arrow ( Pipestone Springs and Little Pipestone Creek l.f.), Dunbar Creek (Easter Lily l.f.), Canyon Ferry, Cook Ranch	An eomyid (an extinct squirrel-like rodent)	
Paradjidaumo	P. cf. P. trilophus	Chadronian - Orellan	McCarty's Mountain l.f., Cook Ranch (Cook Ranch l.f.)	An eomyid (an extinct squirrel-like rodent)	
Paradjidaumo	P. sp.	Whitneyan	White Hills	An eomyid (an extinct squirrel-like rodent)	
Parallomys	P. sp.	Arikareean	lower Cabbage Patch beds	An early aplodontiid (relative of the mountain beaver)	
Pareumys	P. cf. P. muffleri	Uintan	Dell beds	A cylindrodontid	
Pipestoneomys	P. bisulcatus	Chadronian	Climbing Arrow (Little Pipestone Creek l.f.), Dunbar Creek	A pipestoneomyid geomorphan (relative of gophers and kangaroo rats).	
Pleurolicus	P. gwinni	Arikareean	middle Cabbage Patch beds	An entoptychine geomyid (gopher)	
Pleurolicus	P. nelsoni	Arikareean	middle Cabbage Patch beds	An entoptychine geomyid (gopher)	
Pleurolicus	P. rensbergeri	Arikareean	middle Cabbage Patch beds	An entoptychine geomyid (gopher)	
Pleurolicus	P. cf. sulcifrons	Arikareean	middle Cabbage Patch beds	An entoptychine geomyid (gopher)	
Prosciurus	P. vetustus	Chadronian	Climbing Arrow (Pipestone Springs and Little Pipestone Creek l.f.)	A prosciurine aplodontiid (relative of the mountain beaver).	
Pseudocylindrodon	P. neglectus	Chadronian	Climbing Arrow (Pipestone Springs l.f.)	A cylindrodontid	
Pseudocylindrodon	P. cf. P. neglectus	Chadronian	Climbing Arrow (Diamond O Ranch l.f.)	A cylindrodontid	
Pseudotheridomys	P. sp.	Arikareean	lower Cabbage Patch beds	An eomyid (an extinct squirrel-like rodent)	
Rudiomys	R. drummondensis	Arikareean	lower-middle Cabbage Patch beds	An aplodontine aplodontiid (relative of the mountain beaver)	
Rudiomys	R. intsook	Arikareean	lower Cabbage Patch beds	An aplodontine aplodontiid (relative of the mountain beaver)	
Sciurion	S. cf. S. campestre	Arikareean	lower-middle Cabbage Patch beds	An early squirrel with teeth similar to flying squirrels	
Scottimus	S. longiquus	Orellan	Canyon Ferry	A cricetid (early relative of voles, hamsters, and New World mice and rats)	
Spurimus	S. hoffmani	Chadronian	Climbing Arrow (Diamond O Ranch l.f.)	An ischyromyine ischyromyid	
Tenudomys	T. welchi	Arikareean	upper Cabbage Patch beds	An early geomyoid (relative of gophers and kangaroo rats)	
Willeumys	W. argosorus	Whitneyan	White Hills	A cricetid (early relative of voles, hamsters, and New World mice and rats)	
Willeumys	W. viduus	Orellan	Cook Ranch (Cook Ranch l.f.)	A cricetid (early relative of voles, hamsters, and New World mice and rats)	
Wilsoneumys	W. focarius	Orellan	Cook Ranch (Cook Ranch l.f.)	A eumyine cricetid (early relative of voles, hamsters, and New World mice and rats)	
Yoderimys	Y. stewarti	Chadronian	Climbing Arrow	An eomyid (an extinct squirrel-like rodent)	
Zemiodontomys	Z. burkei	Chadronian	Climbing Arrow (Pipestone Springs l.f.)	An eomyid (an extinct squirrel-like rodent)	

=== Other mammals ===
Other mammals of the Renova Formation
Genus / Taxon	Species	NALMA	Strata	Notes	Images
Ectypodus	E. lovei	Duchesnean	Climbing Arrow (Shoddy Springs l.f.)	A neoplagiaulacid multituberculate (rodent-like mammals with no living relatives)	
Hyopsodus	H. cf. H. minusculus	Bridgerian	Sage Creek	A hyopsodontid (short-legged omnivores, possibly related to perissodactyls)	
Hyopsodus	H. sholemi	Duchesnean	Climbing Arrow (Shoddy Springs l.f.)	A hyopsodontid (short-legged omnivores, possibly related to perissodactyls)	
Trogosus	T. sp.	Bridgerian	Sage Creek	A tillodont (large chisel-toothed herbivore with no living relatives)	

== Reptiles ==
Indeterminate varanids (monitor lizards) are known from the Pipestone Springs local fauna, indeterminate glyptosaurines are known from the Dell beds, and indeterminate iguanids (iguanas and kin) are known from both areas. Turtle fossils can also be found at various sites.

Reptiles of the Renova Formation
Genus / Taxon	Species	NALMA	Strata	Notes	Images
Calamagras	C. sp.	Chadronian	Climbing Arrow (Pipestone Springs l.f.)	A constrictor snake	
Glyptosaurus	G. cf. G. montanus	Chadronian	Canyon Ferry	A glyptosaurine lizard	
Glyptosaurus	G. sp.	Chadronian	Douglass Creek beds	A glyptosaurine lizard	
Helodermoides	H. tuberculatus	Chadronian	McCarty's Mountain l.f., Climbing Arrow (Pipestone Springs and Little Pipestone Creek l.f.)	A glyptosaurine lizard	
Ogmophis	O. arenarum	Arikareean	Canyon Ferry	A constrictor snake	
Peltosaurus?	P.? sp.	Chadronian	Climbing Arrow (Pipestone Springs l.f.)	A glyptosaurine lizard	

== Amphibians ==
Amphibians of the Renova Formation
Genus / Taxon	Species	NALMA	Strata	Notes	Images
Taricha	†T. miocenica	Arikareean	middle Cabbage Patch beds	A Pacific newt	
†Tephrodytes	T. brassicarvalis	Arikareean	lower Cabbage Patch beds	A pelodytid (parsley frog)	

== Invertebrates ==
=== Insects ===
The Canyon Ferry lagerstätte is a source of exceptional insect fossils, though most remain undescribed. Another source of insect fossils is the Passamari Member of the Ruby River Basin, in the vicinity of Alder. Standley E. Lewis named numerous fossil insect species from this area in the 1970s.

Insects of the Renova Formation
Family	Genus / species	NALMA	Strata	Notes	Images
Acrididae		Orellan	Canyon Ferry	Indeterminate acridid grasshoppers	
Aeshnidae		Orellan	Canyon Ferry	Indeterminate hawker dragonflies	
Anisopodidae	Sylvicola fenestralis	Whitneyan	Passamari	A window gnat	
Aphididae		Orellan	Canyon Ferry	Indeterminate aphids	
Asilidae	Dioctria jamesi	Whitneyan	Passamari	Robber flies	
Asilidae	Holopogon archilestes	Whitneyan	Passamari	Robber flies	
Asilidae	Senoprosopis beckeri	Whitneyan	Passamari	Robber flies	
Bibionidae		Orellan	Canyon Ferry	Indeterminate March flies	
Bibionidae	Bibio sp.	Whitneyan	Passamari	March flies	
Bibionidae	Hesperinus sp.	Whitneyan	Passamari	March flies	
Bibionidae	Penthetria albacula	Whitneyan	Passamari	March flies	
Bibionidae	Penthetria alderensis	Whitneyan	Passamari	March flies	
Bibionidae	Penthetria rubiensis	Whitneyan	Passamari	March flies	
Bibionidae	Plecia inflata	Whitneyan	Passamari	March flies	
Bibionidae	Plecia sp.	Whitneyan	Passamari	March flies	
Bombyliidae	Alepidophora maxima	Whitneyan	Passamari	Bee flies	
Bombyliidae	Phthiria fossa	Whitneyan	Passamari	Bee flies	
Braconidae		Orellan	Canyon Ferry	Indeterminate braconid parasitoid wasps	
Buprestidae		Orellan	Canyon Ferry	Indeterminate jewel beetles	
Carabidae		Whitneyan	Passamari	Indeterminate ground beetles	
Cecidomyiidae		Orellan	Canyon Ferry	Indeterminate gall midges	
Cercopidae		Orellan	Canyon Ferry	Indeterminate froghoppers	
Chironomidae		Orellan	Canyon Ferry	Indeterminate non-biting midges	
Chorotypidae	Erucius lewisi?	Whitneyan	Passamari	A monkey grasshopper	
Chrysomelidae		Orellan	Canyon Ferry	Indeterminate leaf beetles	
Chrysopidae		Orellan	Canyon Ferry	Indeterminate green lacewings	
Coccinellidae		Orellan	Canyon Ferry	Indeterminate ladybird beetles	
Coreidae		Whitneyan	Passamari	Indeterminate leaf-footed bugs	
Corixidae		Orellan	Canyon Ferry	Indeterminate water boatmen	
Curculionidae		Orellan	Canyon Ferry	Indeterminate snout weevils	
Cydnidae		Whitneyan	Passamari	Indeterminate burrowing bugs	
Diapriidae		Orellan	Canyon Ferry	Indeterminate diapriid parasitoid wasps	
Diopsidae	Prosphyracephala rubiensis	Whitneyan	Passamari	A stalk-eyed fly	
Dytiscidae		Orellan	Canyon Ferry	Indeterminate predaceous diving beetles	
Formicidae	Camponotus sp.	Orellan	Canyon Ferry	Ants	
Formicidae	Dolichoderus sp.	Orellan	Canyon Ferry	Ants	
Formicidae	Lasius sp.	Orellan	Canyon Ferry	Ants	
Formicidae	Liometopum greenwalti	Orellan	Canyon Ferry	Ants	
Formicidae	Manica iviei	Orellan	Canyon Ferry	Ants	
Gerridae		Whitneyan	Passamari	Indeterminate water striders	
Hodotermitidae		Orellan	Canyon Ferry	Indeterminate harvester termites	
Hodotermitidae	Ulmeriella rubiensis	Whitneyan	Passamari	A harvester termite	
Ichneumonidae		Orellan	Canyon Ferry	Indeterminate ichneumon wasps	
Isonychiidae	Isonychia alderensis	Whitneyan	Passamari	A brush-legged mayfly	
Kalotermitidae	Prokalotermes alderensis	Whitneyan	Passamari	A drywood termite	
Lampyridae		Orellan	Canyon Ferry	Indeterminate fireflies	
Limnephilidae		Orellan	Canyon Ferry	Indeterminate Northern caddisflies	
Limnephilidae	Miopsyche rubiensis	Whitneyan	Passamari	A Northern caddisfly	
†Locustopsidae?	Zeunerella lewisi?	Whitneyan	Passamari	A possible grasshopper	
Lygaeidae		Orellan	Canyon Ferry	Indeterminate seed bugs	
Lygaeidae		Whitneyan	Passamari	Indeterminate seed bugs	
Melandryidae		Orellan	Canyon Ferry	Indeterminate melandryid beetles	
Mycetophilidae		Orellan	Canyon Ferry	Indeterminate fungus gnats	
Mycetophilidae	Exechia sp.	Whitneyan	Passamari	A fungus gnat	
Nemopteridae	Marquettia metzeli	Whitneyan	Passamari	A spoonwing	
Neoephemeridae	Potamanthellus rubiensis	Whitneyan	Passamari	A squaregill mayfly	
Notonectidae		Orellan	Canyon Ferry	Indeterminate backswimmers	
Osmylidae		Orellan	Canyon Ferry	Indeterminate giant lacewings	
Pentatomidae		Orellan	Canyon Ferry	Indeterminate stink bugs	
Pentatomidae		Whitneyan	Passamari	Indeterminate stink bugs	
Satyrinae	Lethe montana	Orellan	Canyon Ferry	A treebrown butterfly	
Scarabaeidae		Orellan	Canyon Ferry	Indeterminate scarab beetles	
Scatopsidae		Orellan	Canyon Ferry	Indeterminate minute black scavenger flies	
Scelionidae		Orellan	Canyon Ferry	Indeterminate scelionid parasitoid wasps	
Scolytidae		Orellan	Canyon Ferry	Indeterminate bark beetles	
Syrphidae		Orellan	Canyon Ferry	Indeterminate hoverflies	
Syrphidae	Archisyrphus opacus	Whitneyan	Passamari	A hoverfly	
Syrphidae	Tropidia tumulata	Whitneyan	Passamari	A hoverfly	
Tipulidae		Orellan	Canyon Ferry	Indeterminate crane flies	
Tipulidae	Tipula carolae	Whitneyan	Passamari	A crane fly	
Tipulidae	Tipula rubiensis	Whitneyan	Passamari	A crane fly	
Veliidae		Orellan	Canyon Ferry	Indeterminate riffle bugs	
Vespidae		Orellan	Canyon Ferry	Indeterminate eusocial wasps	

=== Other arthropods ===
Other arthropods of the Renova Formation
Taxon	Species	NALMA	Strata	Notes	Images
Aranea		Orellan	Canyon Ferry	Indeterminate spiders.	
Amplocypris?		Orellan?	Ruby Paper Shale, Medicine Lodge Beds	An ostracod	
Candona	C. sp. aff. C. ohioensis	Orellan?	Ruby Paper Shale, Medicine Lodge Beds	An ostracod	
Candona	C. rangliensis	Orellan?	Ruby Paper Shale, Medicine Lodge Beds	An ostracod	
Cyprois		Orellan?	Ruby Paper Shale, Medicine Lodge Beds	An ostracod	
Eucypris		Orellan?	Ruby Paper Shale, Medicine Lodge Beds	An ostracod	
Paracypridopsis		Orellan?	Ruby Paper Shale, Medicine Lodge Beds	An ostracod	

=== Gastropods ===
Gastropods of the Renova Formation
Taxon	Species	NALMA	Strata	Notes	Images
Gastrocopta	G. cordillerae	Chadronian	Dunbar Creek	A tiny gastrocoptid land snail	
Gastrocopta	G. montana	Uintan - Chadronian	Milligan Creek, Dunbar Creek	A tiny gastrocoptid land snail	
Gastrocopta	G. sagittaria	Uintan - Chadronian	Climbing Arrow	A tiny gastrocoptid land snail	
Gastrocopta	G. sp.	Uintan	Milligan Creek	A tiny gastrocoptid land snail	
Helminthoglypta	H. bozemanensis	Chadronian	Dunbar Creek	A xanthonychid land snail	
Polygyrella	P. cf. P. polygyrella	Uintan - Chadronian	Climbing Arrow	An ammonitellid land snail	
Pupoides	P. hordaceus	Chadronian	Dunbar Creek	A pupillid land snail	
Pupoides	P. tephrodes	Chadronian	Dunbar Creek	A pupillid land snail	
Radiocentrum	R. laevidomus	Uintan	Milligan Creek	An oreohelicid land snail	
Radiocentrum	R. taylori	Chadronian	Dunbar Creek	An oreohelicid land snail	

== Paleoflora ==
Plant fossils of the Renova Formation are most frequently found in the Ruby River Valley (Climbing Arrow and Dunbar Creek members) and Beaverhead Basin (Medicine Lodge Beds). Four plant sites in the Ruby Basin are of special note: Mormon Creek (mid-Chadronian, 35 Ma), Metzel Ranch (late Chadronian, 34 Ma), Ruby Paper Shale (latest Chadronian or earliest Orellan, 33 Ma), and York Ranch (late Orellan, 32 Ma). The three major sites in the Beaverhead Basin (Christensen Ranch, Horse Prairie, Medicine Lodge) are probably Orellan in age.

Together, these seven sites reconstruct the transformation of the Rocky Mountains' flora and estimated climate across the Eocene-Oligocene Boundary:

- Mormon Creek had a monthly mean temperature range from 0.6–43.2 °C (33.1–109.8 °F), and a 3-month precipitation range from 49.4–138 cm (19.4–54.3 in). The estimated paleoelevation is 3,450 m (11,320 ft). It reconstructs a warm climate with moderate rainfall, similar to modern subtropical and high-elevation tropical environments. The flora is very diverse, with Fabaceae and Lauraceae (legumes and laurels) as the most common plants. The flora has a cosmopolitan character, with some similarities to forests found in modern Japan, Mexico, India, and Germany.
- Metzel Ranch had a monthly mean temperature range from 0.8–32.6 °C (33.4–90.7 °F), and a 3-month precipitation range from 9.2–92.7 cm (3.6–36.5 in). The estimated paleoelevation is 1,910 m (6,270 ft). It reconstructs a warm but highly seasonal climate with a more intense summer dry season. The subtropical flora of Mormon Creek is replaced by a surge of Salicaceae, Rosaceae, and Ulmaceae (members of the willow, rose, and elm families), more temperate groups which tolerated the drier climate at the end of the Eocene. Xeric (drought-tolerant) species and East Asian temperate species become increasingly common as well. The dry-summer woodland flora is similar to plants found in modern Missouri and Ohio, and remains common well into the Oligocene of Montana.
- Ruby had a monthly mean temperature range from 1–29 °C (34–84 °F), and a 3-month precipitation range from 8.2–128.4 cm (3.2–50.6 in). The estimated paleoelevation is 2,520 m (8,270 ft). These shales were deposited in a wetland which sampled foliage from many different habitats, including the common dry-summer temperate species of Metzel Ranch. Fagaceae and Betulaceae (members of the oak and birch families) become common, alongside remains of conifers from montane forests. Xeric scrubland contributions are similar to the transitional mountain mahogany-oak scrub of the modern Rockies and the pinyon-juniper woodland scrub of the American southwest.
- The Beaverhead Basin floras collectively had monthly mean temperatures ranging from 3.5–30.5 °C (38.3–86.9 °F) and 3-month precipitation ranging from 6.8–117.8 cm (2.7–46.4 in). Their more moderate temperature profile is a result of their lower estimated paleoelevation (about 1,520–1,810 m (4,990–5,940 ft)) relative to the Ruby River Valley sites. The Beaverhead Basin floras are generally similar to Metzel Ranch and the Ruby Paper Shales, with contributions from dry-summer temperate woodlands, montane conifer forests, and xeric scrub. East Asian temperate groups are more common, but otherwise there are few differences from the more upland floras.
- York Ranch had a monthly mean temperature range from −1.3–34.5 °C (29.7–94.1 °F), and a 3-month precipitation range from 10.2–87.2 cm (4.0–34.3 in). The estimated paleoelevation is 2,300 m (7,500 ft). It was another wetland environment dominated by the willow, oak, and birch families, alongside the hickory, maple, dogwood, and grapevine families. Winter freezes become a regular occurrence at higher elevations. Many East Asian groups are fully extinct in North America by this time, lending a character more similar to modern eastern North America.

See Lielke, Manchester, and Meyer (2012) for a more detailed breakdown of plant diversity.

=== Gymnosperms ===
Gymnosperms of the Renova Formation
Family	Genus	Species (no.)	Common Name
Pinaceae	Abies	4	Fir
Pinaceae	Picea	3	Spruce
Pinaceae	Pinus	6	Pine
Pinaceae	Pseudolarix	1	Golden larch
Pinaceae	Pseudotsuga	3	Douglas fir
Taxaceae			Yew
Cupressaceae	Chamaecyparis	1	False-cypress
Cupressaceae	Glyptostrobus	2	
Cupressaceae	Juniperus	1	Juniper
Cupressaceae	Metasequoia	1	Dawn redwood
Cupressaceae	Sequoia	1	Redwood
Cupressaceae	Taxodium	1	Cypress
Cupressaceae	Thuja	1	Arborvitae
Ephedraceae	Ephedra	1	Jointfir
Ginkgoaceae	Ginkgo	1	Ginkgo

=== Angiosperms ===
Angiosperms of the Renova Formation
Family	Genus	Species (no.)	Common Name
Typhaceae	Typha	1	Cattails
Poaceae	Phragmites	1	Reeds
Poaceae	Agrostis	1	Bentgrass
Poaceae	Arundo	1	Giant cane
Poaceae	†Poacites	1	
Sabiaceae	Sabia	1	
Limnathaceae	Floerkea	1	False mermaidweed
Potamogetonaceae	Potamogeton	1	
Cyperaceae	Eleocharis	2	Spikerushes
Liliaceae	Smilax	2	Catbriers
Cannaceae	Canna	1	Canna lily
Salicaceae	Populus	11	Poplar
Salicaceae	†Pseudosalix	3	
Salicaceae	Salix	13	Willow
Myricaceae	Myrica	5	Bayberry
Juglandaceae	Carya	2	Hickory
Juglandaceae	Engelhardia	1	
Juglandaceae	Juglans	1	Walnut
Betulaceae	Alnus	4	Alder
Betulaceae	Betula	4	Birch
Betulaceae	Corylus	1	Hazel
Betulaceae	Ostrya	1	Hop-hornbeam
Betulaceae	†Paracarpinus	2	
Fagaceae	Castanea	3	Chestnut
Fagaceae	†Fagopsis	1	
Fagaceae	Fagus	1	Beech
Fagaceae	Quercus	14	Oak
Ulmaceae	†Cedrelospermum	5	
Ulmaceae	Celtis	4	Hackberry
Ulmaceae	Ulmus	4	Elm
Moraceae	Morus	2	Mulberry
Proteaceae	†Knightophyllum	2	
Proteaceae	Lomatia	1	Lomatia
Nymphaeaceae	Nelumbo	1	Lotus
Nymphaeaceae	Nuphar	1	Water-lily
Nymphaeaceae	†Nymphaeites	1	
Cercidiphyllaceae	Cercidiphyllum	3	Katsura
Ranunculaceae	Clematis	1	Clematis
Berberidaceae	Berberis	1	Barberry
Berberidaceae	Mahonia	9	Oregon grape
Cruciferae	Thlaspi	1	Pennycress
Saxifragaceae	Hydrangea	2	Hydrangea
Saxifragaceae	Philadelphus	1	Mock-orange
Saxifragaceae	Ribes	2	Currant
Eucommiaceae	Eucommia	1	Chinese rubber tree
Menispermaceae	Cocculus	1	
Lauraceae	†Laurophyllum	1	
Lauraceae	Nectandra	1	Sweetwood
Lauraceae	Persea	1	Avocado
Lauraceae	Sassafras	3	Sassafras
Elaeagnaceae	Elaeagnus	1	Silverberry
Hamamelidaceae	Exbucklandia	1	Pipli tree
Platanaceae	Platanus	2	Plane tree
Rosaceae	Amelanchier	3	Serviceberry
Rosaceae	Cercocarpus	3	Mountain mahogany
Rosaceae	Chamaebatia	1	Mountain misery
Rosaceae	Crataegus	3	Hawthorn
Rosaceae	Kerria	1	Kerria
Rosaceae	Potentilla	3	Cinquefoil
Rosaceae	Prunus	4	Cherry
Rosaceae	Pyracantha	1	Firethorn
Rosaceae	Rosa	1	Rose
Rosaceae	Sorbus	2	Rowan
Rosaceae	Spiraea	2	Meadowsweet
Rosaceae	Vauquelinia	1	Rosewood
Rosaceae	Waldsteinia	1	Barren strawberry
Fabaceae	Albizia	1	Silk tree
Fabaceae	Astragalus	1	Milkvetch
Fabaceae	†Caesalpinites	2	
Fabaceae	Canavalia	1	Jack-bean
Fabaceae	Cassia	4	Cassia
Fabaceae	Cercis	2	Redbud
Fabaceae	Cladrastis	2	Yellowwood
Fabaceae	Conzattia	1	
Fabaceae	Dalbergia	1	Rosewood
Fabaceae	Desmodium	1	Tick-trefoil
Fabaceae	Diphysa	1	
Fabaceae	†Leguminosites	1	
Fabaceae	Leucaena	1	Leadtree
Fabaceae	Lonchocarpus	1	Lancepod
Fabaceae	†Mimosites	1	
Fabaceae	Parkinsonia	1	Palo verde
Fabaceae	Pithecolobium	1	Blackbead
Fabaceae	Robinia	2	Locust
Fabaceae	Sophora	1	Necklace pod
Simaroubaceae	Ailanthus	1	Tree-of-heaven
Simaroubaceae	†Chaneya	1	
Meliaceae	Cedrela	2	Spanish cedar
Anacardiaceae	Cotinus	1	Smoketree
Anacardiaceae	Metopium	1	Poisonwood
Anacardiaceae	Rhus	5	Sumac
Euphorbiaceae	Mallotus	1	Kamala
Aquifoliaceae	Ilex	2	Holly
Celastraceae	†Celastrinites	1	
Celastraceae	†Celastrophyllum	1	
Celastraceae	Celastrus	2	Staff vine
Celastraceae	Euonymus	1	Spindle
Staphyleaceae	Staphylea	1	Bladdernut
Sapindaceae	Acer	8	Maple
Sapindaceae	Athyana	1	
Sapindaceae	Cardiospermum	1	Heartseed
Sapindaceae	†Cupanites	1	
Sapindaceae	Dipteronia	1	
Sapindaceae	Dodonaea	1	Hop-bush
Sapindaceae	Koelreuteria	4	Golden rain tree
Sapindaceae	Sapindus	1	Soapberry
Rhamnaceae	Berchemia	1	Supplejack
Rhamnaceae	Ceanothus	2	Buckbrush
Rhamnaceae	Colubrina	1	Nakedwood
Rhamnaceae	Paliurus	2	Jerusalem thorn
Rhamnaceae	Reynosia	1	Darlingplum
Rhamnaceae	Rhamnus	3	Buckthorn
Rhamnaceae	†Rhamnites	2	
Vitaceae	Vitis	2	Grapevine
Nyssaceae	Nyssa	2	Tupelo
Elaeocarpaceae	Elaeocarpus	1	
Ericaceae	Vaccinium	1	Blueberry
Ericaceae	Arctostaphylos	1	Manzanita
Dilleniaceae	†Dillenites	1	
Flacourtiaceae	Idesia	1	
Eleagnaceae	Shepherdia	1	Buffaloberry
Araliaceae	Aralia	2	Spikenard
Cornaceae	Alangium	2	
Cornaceae	†Grewiopsis	1	
Cornaceae	Cornus	3	Dogwood
Sapotaceae	Bumelia	1	Bully tree
Ebenaceae	Diospyros	1	Ebony
Oleaceae	Fraxinus	5	Ash
Oleaceae	Osmanthus	1	Osmanthus
Malvaceae	Craigia	2	
Malvaceae	†Florissantia	1	
Malvaceae	Sterculia	1	Tropical chestnut
Malvaceae	Tilia	2	Linden
Caprifoliaceae	Sambucus	1	Elder
Caprifoliaceae	Symphoricarpos	1	Snowberry
Caprifoliaceae	Viburnum	2	Viburnum
Paulowniaceae	Paulownia	2	Princess tree
Bignoniaceae	Callichlamys	1	
Bignoniaceae	Catalpa	1	Catawba
Asteraceae?	Viguiera	1	Goldeneye
