= Ctenophthalmus pseudagyrtes =

Scientific classification
- Kingdom: Animalia
- Phylum: Arthropoda
- Class: Insecta
- Order: Siphonaptera
- Family: Ctenophthalmidae
- Genus: Ctenophthalmus
- Species: C. pseudagyrtes

Binomial name
- Ctenophthalmus pseudagyrtes Baker, 1904

Subspecies
- Ctenophthalmus pseudagyrtes micropus Traub, 1950; Ctenophthalmus pseudagyrtes pseudagyrtes Baker, 1904

Species of flea

Ctenophthalmus pseudagyrtes is a species of fleas in the family Hystrichopsyllidae. It is widespread in North America, east of the Rocky Mountains, and is found mainly on small mammals. In Missouri, it has been recorded on the Virginia opossum (Didelphis virginiana), northern short-tailed shrew (Blarina brevicauda), eastern mole (Scalopus aquaticus), raccoon (Procyon lotor), eastern chipmunk (Tamias striatus), Florida woodrat (Neotoma floridana), prairie vole (Microtus ochrogaster), woodland vole (Microtus pinetorum), white-footed mouse (Peromyscus leucopus), including nests, marsh rice rat (Oryzomys palustris), hispid cotton rat (Sigmodon hispidus), house mouse (Mus musculus), and brown rat (Rattus norvegicus). Hosts recorded in Tennessee include the Virginia opossum, northern short-tailed shrew, eastern mole, eastern chipmunk, southern red-backed vole (Myodes gapperi), rock vole (Microtus chrotorrhinus), woodland vole, white-footed mouse, golden mouse (Ochrotomys nuttalli), hispid cotton rat, marsh rice rat, and house mouse.

== Literature cited ==
- Durden, L.A. and Kollars, T.M., Jr. 1997. The fleas (Siphonaptera) of Tennessee. Journal of Vector Ecology 22(1):13–22.
- Kollars, T.M., Jr., Durden, L.A. and Oliver, J.H., Jr. 1997. Fleas and lice parasitizing mammals in Missouri. Journal of Vector Ecology 22(2):125–132.
