= Stenoponia americana =

Scientific classification
- Kingdom: Animalia
- Phylum: Arthropoda
- Class: Insecta
- Order: Siphonaptera
- Family: Hystrichopsyllidae
- Genus: Stenoponia
- Species: S. americana

Binomial name
- Stenoponia americana (Baker, 1899)

Species of flea

Stenoponia americana is a species of large flea in the family Hystrichopsyllidae. It is widespread in North America east of the Great Plains and is found mainly on rodents, notably deermice (Peromyscus) and voles (Microtus). In Missouri, it has been recorded on the fox squirrel (Sciurus niger), brush mouse (Peromyscus boylii), cotton mouse (Peromyscus gossypinus), prairie vole (Microtus ochrogaster; nest only), woodland vole (Microtus pinetorum), and white-footed mouse (Peromyscus leucopus). Hosts recorded in Tennessee include the northern short-tailed shrew (Blarina brevicauda), woodland vole, white-footed mouse, hispid cotton rat (Sigmodon hispidus), marsh rice rat (Oryzomys palustris), and house mouse (Mus musculus). In South Carolina, recorded hosts include the cotton mouse, hispid cotton rat, and marsh rice rat.

== Literature cited ==
- Durden, L.A. and Kollars, T.M., Jr. 1997. The fleas (Siphonaptera) of Tennessee. Journal of Vector Ecology 22(1):13–22.
- Durden, L.A., Wills, W. and Clark, K.L. 1999. The fleas (Siphonaptera) of South Carolina with an assessment of their vectorial importance. Journal of Vector Ecology 24(2):171–181.
- Kollars, T.M., Jr., Durden, L.A. and Oliver, J.H., Jr. 1997. Fleas and lice parasitizing mammals in Missouri. Journal of Vector Ecology 22(2):125–132.
