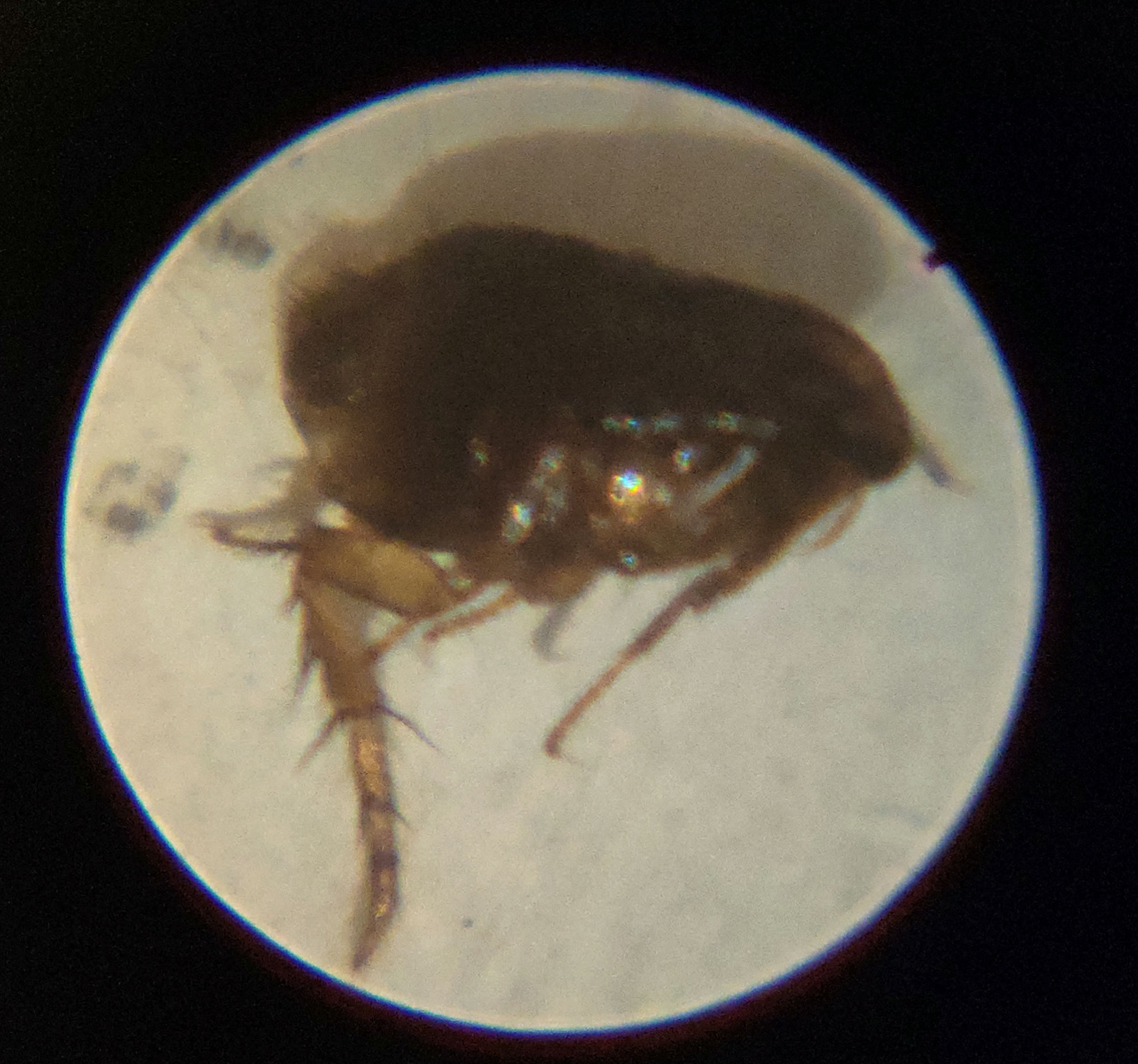
- Ctenophthalmus agyrtes through a microscope

Scientific classification
- Kingdom: Animalia
- Phylum: Arthropoda
- Class: Insecta
- Order: Siphonaptera
- Family: Ctenophthalmidae
- Subfamily: Ctenophthalminae
- Tribe: Ctenophthalmini
- Genus: Ctenophthalmus; Kolenati, 1856

Species
- Ctenophthalmus agyrtes; Ctenophthalmus andorrensis; Ctenophthalmus andorrensis catalaniensis; Ctenophthalmus apertus; Ctenophthalmus apertus allani; Ctenophthalmus assimilis; Ctenophthalmus baeticus; Ctenophthalmus baeticus arvernus; Ctenophthalmus baeticus boisseauorum; Ctenophthalmus breviprojiciens; Ctenophthalmus caballeroi; Ctenophthalmus calceatus; Ctenophthalmus calceatus cabirus; Ctenophthalmus congener; Ctenophthalmus congeneroides; Ctenophthalmus congeneroides congeneroides; Ctenophthalmus cryptotis; Ctenophthalmus dolichus; Ctenophthalmus dolichus dolichus; Ctenophthalmus formosanus; Ctenophthalmus nobilis; Ctenophthalmus nobilis dobyi; Ctenophthalmus obtusus; Ctenophthalmus pseudagyrtes; Ctenophthalmus pseudagyrtes micropus Traub, 1950; Ctenophthalmus pseudagyrtes pseudagyrtes Baker, 1904; Ctenophthalmus quadratus; Ctenophthalmus rettigi; Ctenophthalmus rettigi smiti; Ctenophthalmus sanborni; Ctenophthalmus tecpin; Ctenophthalmus uncinatus; Ctenophthalmus yunnanus

Synonyms
- Spalacopsylla (Pimo, 1930); Spalacropsylla

= Ctenophthalmus =

Genus of fleas

Ctenophthalmus is a genus of fleas in the family Hystrichopsyllidae.

Multiple species in this genus are responsible for transmission of Yersinia pestis in Russia and north Asia.
