= Hystrichopsylla schefferi =

Scientific classification
- Kingdom: Animalia
- Phylum: Arthropoda
- Class: Insecta
- Order: Siphonaptera
- Family: Hystrichopsyllidae
- Genus: Hystrichopsylla
- Species: H. schefferi

Binomial name
- Hystrichopsylla schefferi Chapin 1919
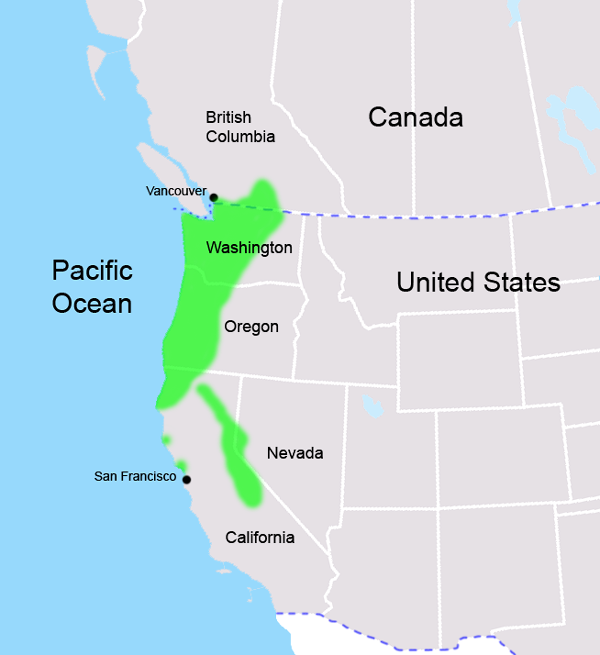
- Distribution of host species

Synonyms
- Hystrichopsylla hubbardi Augustson 1953; Hystrichopsylla mammoth Chapin 1921

Species of flea

Hystrichopsylla schefferi, also known as the mountain beaver flea and giant mountain beaver flea, is a parasitic nearctic insect and a flea, belonging to the order Siphonaptera, the fleas. With an adult body length of as much as 0.5 inches (13 mm), it is the largest living flea in the world, and is native to the American Northwest.

== Association with the mountain beaver ==
Though most members of the genus Hystrichopsylla are not strongly associated with any particular host animal and will parasitize insectivores and rodents generally, H. schefferi is monoxenously associated with the mountain beaver with which its range is coterminous.

== Evolutionary history ==
The fleas of the family Hystrichopsyllidae, along with the family Pulicidae, are the oldest of fleas in evolutionary history. H. schefferi can be distinguished from the very similar and closely related species Hystrichopsylla gigas dippiei by the number of spines in the pronotal comb, as H. g. dippiei has 36 and H. schefferi has 46.

== See also ==
- List of largest insects
