= Epitedia =

Scientific classification
- Kingdom: Animalia
- Phylum: Arthropoda
- Class: Insecta
- Order: Siphonaptera
- Family: Ctenophthalmidae
- Genus: Epitedia; Jordan, 1938

Genus of fleas

Epitedia is a genus of insects belonging to the family Hystrichopsyllidae.

The species of this genus are found in Northern America.

Species:

- Epitedia cavernicola Traub, 1957
- Epitedia faceta (Rothschild, 1915)
