= Gobiocylindrodon =

Gobiocylindrodon Temporal range: Ypresian–Lutetian

Scientific classification
- Kingdom: Animalia
- Phylum: Chordata
- Class: Mammalia
- Infraclass: Placentalia
- Order: Rodentia
- Family: †Cylindrodontidae
- Genus: †Gobiocylindrodon; Li et al., 2019
- Species: †G. ulausuensis

Binomial name
- †Gobiocylindrodon ulausuensis Li et al., 2019

Extinct genus of cylindrodontid rodent

Gobiocylindrodon is an extinct genus of cylindrodontid rodent that lived in East Asia during the Ypresian and Lutetian stages of the Eocene epoch.

== Description ==
Gobiocylindrodon ulausuensis possessed a hypoconid that was slightly anterolabially extended on its M_{1}, M_{2}, and M_{3}. Compared to later cylindrodontids, it had less rounded maxillary molars and lower molar crowns, and its hypolophid on P_{4} was more oblique. Its mandibular incisors had pauciserial enamel.
