= Neopsylla =

Scientific classification
- Kingdom: Animalia
- Phylum: Arthropoda
- Class: Insecta
- Order: Siphonaptera
- Family: Hystrichopsyllidae
- Genus: Neopsylla; Wagner, 1903

Genus of insects

Neopsylla is a genus of fleas belonging to the family Hystrichopsyllidae.

The species of this genus are found in Europe and Southeastern Asia.

Multiple species in this genus are responsible for transmission of Yersinia pestis in Russia and north Asia.

Species:

- Neopsylla abagaitui Ioff, 1946
- Neopsylla acanthina Jordan & Rothschild, 1923
- Neopsylla affinis Li Kueichen & Hsieh Paochi, 1964
- Neopsylla aliena Jordan & Rothschild, 1911
- Neopsylla angustimanubra Wu Houyoung, Wu Fulin & Liu Chiying, 1966
