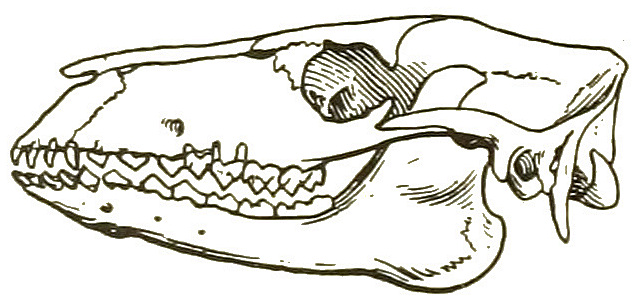
- Protylopus petersoni skull

Scientific classification
- Kingdom: Animalia
- Phylum: Chordata
- Class: Mammalia
- Order: Artiodactyla
- Family: †Oromerycidae
- Genus: †Protylopus; Wortman, 1898

Species
- †P. petersoni (type); †P. annectens; †P. pearsonensis; †P. robustus; †P. stocki

= Protylopus =

Protylopus Temporal range: Early Eocene–Late Eocene

Extinct genus of mammals

Protylopus is an extinct genus of camel that lived during middle to late Eocene some 50-40 million years ago in North America.

Along with being the oldest camel known, it was also the smallest, reaching a length of 80 centimetres (2.6 ft), and probably weighing around 26 kilograms (57 lb). Based on its teeth, it probably fed on the soft leaves of forest plants. Protylopus's front legs were shorter than the hind legs, and ended in four-toed feet. The hind legs also ended in four toes, but most of the weight was carried by the third and fourth, so it may have raised itself up on its back legs like the modern day gerenuk antelope to feed. The shape of the toes suggests that the animal possessed hooves, rather than the foot-pads of modern camels.
