= Stenoponia =

Scientific classification
- Kingdom: Animalia
- Phylum: Arthropoda
- Class: Insecta
- Order: Siphonaptera
- Family: Hystrichopsyllidae
- Genus: Stenoponia; Jordan & Rothschild, 1911

Genus of fleas

Stenoponia is a genus of fleas belonging to the family Hystrichopsyllidae.

The species of this genus are found in Europe and Northern America.

Species:

- Stenoponia americana (Baker, 1899)
- Stenoponia coelestis Jordan & Rothschild, 1911
