= Anomoemys =

Anomoemys Temporal range: Eocene–Oligocene

Scientific classification
- Kingdom: Animalia
- Phylum: Chordata
- Class: Mammalia
- Order: Rodentia
- Suborder: Cylindrodontidae
- Genus: †Anomoemys; Wang, 1986

Species
- Anomoemys lohiculus Matthew & Granger, 1923; Anomoemys lewisi Black, 1974

Extinct genus of cylindrodontid rodent

Anomoemys is an extinct genus of cylindrodontid rodent that lived during the Eocene and Oligocene epochs.

== Distribution ==
The type species, Anomoemys lohiculus, is known from the Ulantatal Formation of Inner Mongolia, China. Anomoemys lewisi is known from the Badwater site in Wyoming of Duchesnean age.
