= Niglarodon =

Niglarodon Temporal range: Oligocene, 30.8–26.3 Ma

Scientific classification
- Kingdom: Animalia
- Phylum: Chordata
- Class: Mammalia
- Infraclass: Placentalia
- Order: Rodentia
- Family: Aplodontiidae
- Genus: †Niglarodon; Black, 1961

Species
- Niglaradon blacki; Niglaradon koerni; Niglaradon loneyi; Niglaradon petersonensis; Niglaradon progressus; Niglaradon yeariani

Extinct genus of rodents

Niglaradon is an extinct genus of mountain beaver in the family Aplodontiidae, found from Idaho to South Dakota during the Oligocene.
