= Oligopetes =

Oligopetes Temporal range: Oligocene, 33.9−28.4 Ma

Scientific classification
- Kingdom: Animalia
- Phylum: Chordata
- Class: Mammalia
- Infraclass: Placentalia
- Order: Rodentia
- Family: Aplodontiidae
- Genus: †Oligopetes; Heissig, 1979

Extinct genus of rodents

Oligopetes is an extinct genus of rodents in the family of Aplodontiidae, found from Spain to Pakistan during the Oligocene.
