= Hystrichopsylla =

Scientific classification
- Kingdom: Animalia
- Phylum: Arthropoda
- Clade: Pancrustacea
- Class: Insecta
- Order: Siphonaptera
- Family: Hystrichopsyllidae
- Genus: Hystrichopsylla; Taschenberg, 1880

Genus of fleas

Hystrichopsylla is a genus of insects belonging to the family Hystrichopsyllidae.

The species of this genus are found in Europe and Northern America.

== Species ==
- Hystrichopsylla cryptotis Acosta & Morrone, 2005
- Hystrichopsylla dippiei Rothschild, 1902
- Hystrichopsylla schefferi Chapin, 1919
