= Doratopsylla =

Scientific classification
- Kingdom: Animalia
- Phylum: Arthropoda
- Class: Insecta
- Order: Siphonaptera
- Family: Hystrichopsyllidae
- Genus: Doratopsylla; Jordan & Rothschild, 1912

Genus of fleas

Doratopsylla is a genus of insects belonging to the family Hystrichopsyllidae.

The species of this genus are found in Europe and Northern America.

Species:

- Doratopsylla blarinae C.Fox, 1914
- Doratopsylla coreana Darskaya, 1949
