= Palaeopsylla =

Scientific classification
- Kingdom: Animalia
- Phylum: Arthropoda
- Class: Insecta
- Order: Siphonaptera
- Family: Hystrichopsyllidae
- Genus: Palaeopsylla

Genus of fleas

Palaeopsylla is a genus of insects belonging to the family Hystrichopsyllidae.

The species of this genus are found in Eurasia.

== Species ==
- Palaeopsylla alpestris Argyropulo, 1946
- Palaeopsylla anserocepsoides Zhang Jintong, Wu Houyoung & Liu Chiying, 1984
- Palaeopsylla aysenurae Keskin, Dik, 2019
