= Rhadinopsylla =

Scientific classification
- Kingdom: Animalia
- Phylum: Arthropoda
- Class: Insecta
- Order: Siphonaptera
- Family: Hystrichopsyllidae
- Genus: Rhadinopsylla; Jordan & Rothschild, 1912

Genus of fleas

Rhadinopsylla is a genus of insects belonging to the family Hystrichopsyllidae.

The species of this genus are found in Europe and Northern America.

Species:

- Rhadinopsylla accola Wagner, 1930
- Rhadinopsylla acuminata Ioff & Tiflov, 1946
