= Ninamys =

Ninamys Temporal range: Oligocene, 28.4–23.0 Ma

Scientific classification
- Domain: Eukaryota
- Kingdom: Animalia
- Phylum: Chordata
- Class: Mammalia
- Order: Rodentia
- Family: Aplodontiidae
- Genus: †Ninamys; Vianey-Liaud, Rodrigues & Marivaux, 2013

Extinct genus of rodents

Ninamys was an extinct genus of rodents in the family Aplodontiidae that lived in China during the Oligocene.
