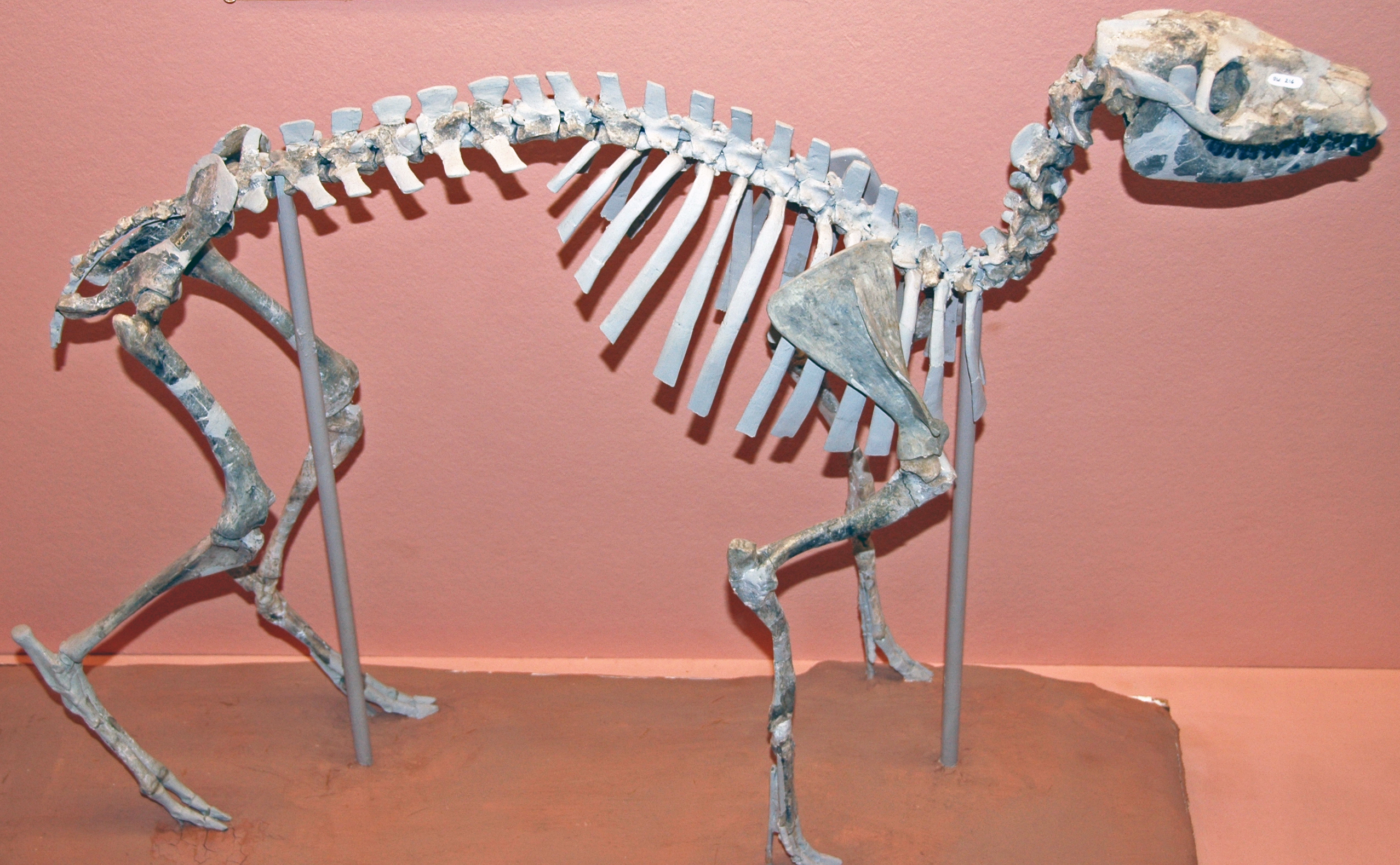
- Complete skeleton of Eotylopus at the University of Wyoming Geological Museum

Scientific classification
- Kingdom: Animalia
- Phylum: Chordata
- Class: Mammalia
- Infraclass: Placentalia
- Order: Artiodactyla
- Superfamily: Cameloidea
- Family: †Oromerycidae; Gazin, 1955

Genera
- †Eotylopus †Malaquiferus †Merycobunodon †Montanatylopus †Oromeryx †Protylopus

= Oromerycidae =

Oromerycidae Temporal range: Eocene (Uintan - Chadronian)

Extinct family of mammals

Oromerycidae is an extinct family of artiodactyls (even-toed hoofed mammals) closely related to living camels, known from the early to late Eocene (Uintan to Chadronian) of western North America. Oromerycids were small both in terms of size and overall diversity, and most information on their anatomy relies on Eotylopus, which is known from a complete skeleton.

Oromerycids are placed in the artiodactyl suborder Tylopoda, which also includes camels and a variable number of extinct families. Some researchers have viewed the similarity to camels as strong enough to warrant placement of oromerycids within the family Camelidae as a subfamily, Oromerycinae, but most have favored placement in a distinct family, albeit a closely related one.

== Description ==
Oromerycids were very similar to early members of other tylopod families, but they lack the specializations of those families, such as the bony protuberances on the skulls of protoceratids or the strongly elongated limbs of camels. Like other tylopods, oromerycids had selenodont teeth (to some degree) and gracile limbs. Their auditory bullae are enlarged and composed of spongy bone, similar to the early camel Poebrotherium.

Oromerycids show only a few specializations that distinguish them from other tylopods. Some notable features include fusion of the radius and ulna in the forearm, an upper molar protocone which splits at the back, and a distinct cleft between the entoconid and hypoconulid cusps on the last lower molar. The tooth row lacks major gaps, unlike modern camels but similar to other early tylopods. The incisors are spatulate (spoon-shaped), the canines are similar in size to the incisors, and the premolars are blade-like. Compared to later tylopods, the molar teeth are brachydont (low and broad) and somewhat more bunodont (with lumpy cusps for crushing). The front feet have four metacarpals, the middle two having the largest hoofs, while the rear feet have only two functional digits.
