= Lophicylindrodon =

Lophicylindrodon Temporal range: Rupelian

Scientific classification
- Kingdom: Animalia
- Phylum: Chordata
- Class: Mammalia
- Infraclass: Placentalia
- Order: Rodentia
- Family: †Cylindrodontidae
- Genus: †Lophicylindrodon; Korth & Tabrum, 2017
- Species: †L. expiratus

Binomial name
- †Lophicylindrodon expiratus Korth & Tabrum, 2017

Extinct genus of rodents

Lophicylindrodon is an extinct genus of cylindrodontid that inhabited North America during the Rupelian stage of the Oligocene epoch.

== Distribution ==
Lophicylindrodon expiratus is known from southwestern Montana.
