= Mountain beaver =

Mountain beaver Temporal range: Late Pleistocene–recent

Conservation status
- Least Concern (IUCN 3.1)

Scientific classification
- Kingdom: Animalia
- Phylum: Chordata
- Class: Mammalia
- Order: Rodentia
- Family: Aplodontiidae
- Genus: Aplodontia; Richardson, 1829
- Species: A. rufa

Binomial name
- Aplodontia rufa (Rafinesque, 1817)
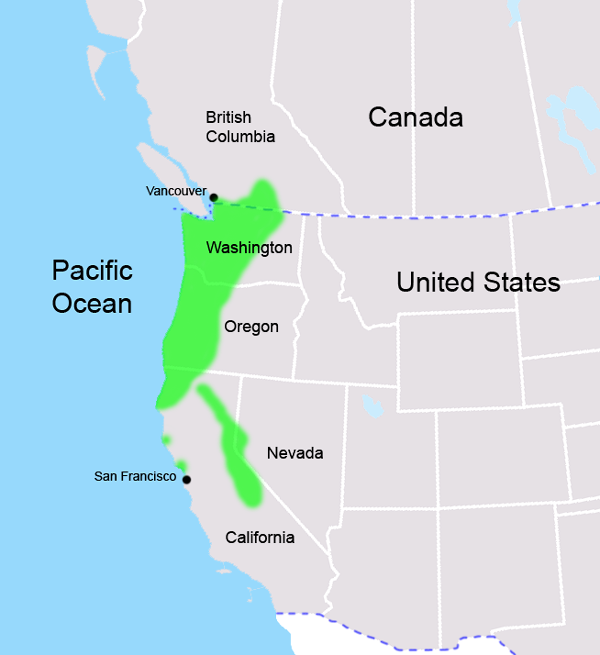

Species of the genus Aplodontia

The mountain beaver (Aplodontia rufa) or sewellel (Note: Other names include boomer, mountain boomer, ground bear, giant mole, gehalis, suwellel, showhurll, showtl, and showte, as well as a number of other Native American terms. "Boomer" refers to the loud vocalizations that these usually-solitary animals make when in social situations, but this has not been recorded nor verified.) is a North American rodent. It is the only living member of its genus, Aplodontia, and family, Aplodontiidae. It should not be confused with true North American and Eurasian beavers, to which it is not closely related; the mountain beaver is instead more closely related to squirrels. There are seven subspecies of mountain beaver, six of which are found in California and three of which are endemic to the state.

== Etymology ==
The name sewellel was recorded by Lewis and Clark who misunderstood the Chinook word [ʃʔulal] (which they annotated as "she-wal-lal"), the name for garments made from their skin; the Chinook themselves call it "ogwoolal" (pronounced [əɡʷulal]). "Mountain beaver" is a misnomer as the animal is not a true beaver nor restricted to mountains.

The name Aplodontia ("simple tooth") is in reference to the single large basin comprising the bulk of each cheek tooth. The specific epithet, rufa, means red or reddish. Most references use the spelling "Aplodontidae" for the family name. This has been deemed incorrect due to the technical rules of converting a genus name into a family name. The proper conversion of Aplodontia to a family name is to drop the -a only and add -idae. Thus, Aplodontiidae is technically correct. This spelling is gaining acceptance in modern texts and is the standard spelling currently recognized by the Integrated Taxonomic Information System. Alternate spellings of the genus name have also been reported, with as many as 30 variants historically. These include "Haplodontia", "Haplodon", "Aploodontia", "Apluodontia", and "Aplodontie", among others.

== Taxonomy and phylogeny ==
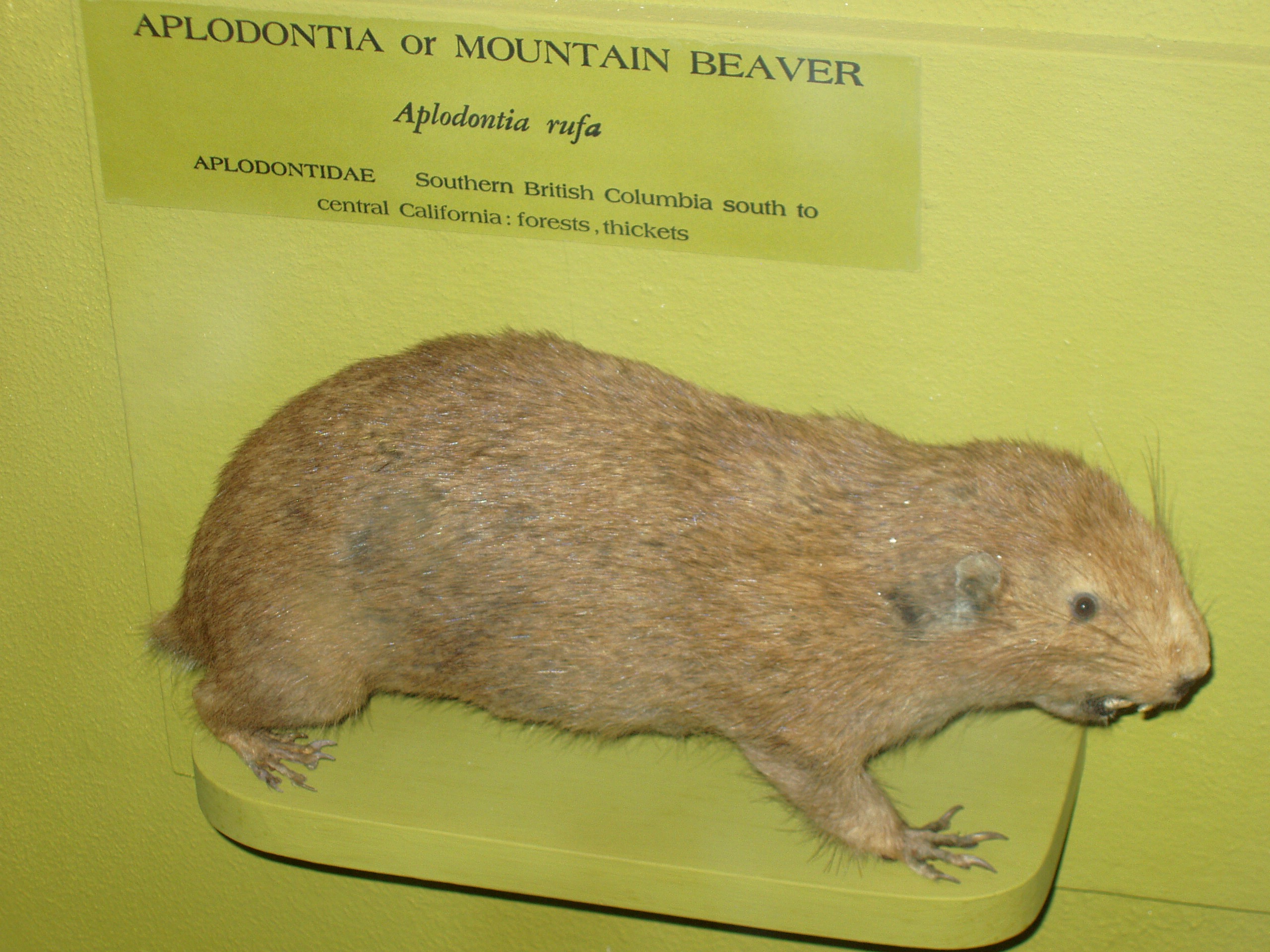
Aplodontia rufa specimen at Harvard University

Originating in the late Oligocene, the mountain beaver has retained a number of primitive characteristics that make it a living fossil. In particular, it is the only surviving species to retain the Eocene-era protrogomorph chewing mechanism (zygomasseteric system).

In the protrogomorphous condition, the medial masseter muscle does not pass through the infraorbital foramen as it does in guinea pigs and mice. Likewise, the lateral masseter muscle attaches to the base of the zygomatic arch and does not extend to the region in front of the eye as is seen in squirrels and mice. Although modern blesmols also share the mountain beaver's primitive, protrogomorphous chewing mechanism, this trait appears to have newly re-evolved in that family.

In addition to its skull and jaw, the mountain beaver's kidneys are notably primitive. Their poor renal function is considered one of the key limits on the species' geographic distribution.

The mountain beaver was once thought to be related to the earliest protrogomorphous rodents, such as the ischyromyids (Paramys). Both molecular and morphological phylogeneticists have recently suggested a more distant relationship to these animals.

Molecular studies have revealed the Sciuridae (squirrels) clade as the mountain beaver's closest living relative. According to the fossil record, the Aplodontiidae clade split from the squirrels in the Middle or Late Eocene as indicated by the extinct genera Spurimus and Prosciurus.

=== Subspecies ===
At present, seven subspecies of Aplodontia rufa are recognized:

- A. r. californica (Peters, 1864): distributed throughout the Sierra Nevada in Northern California and extreme western Nevada
- A. r. humboldtiana Taylor, 1916: restricted to the far northwestern coast of California
- A. r. nigra Taylor, 1914: restricted to a small region in southern Mendocino County, California
- A. r. pacifica Merriam, 1899: distributed across coastal Oregon
- A. r. phaea Merriam, 1899: found mostly in Point Reyes, northwest of San Francisco, California
- A. r. rainieri Merriam, 1899: found across the Cascade Range from southern British Columbia to southern Washington
- A. r. rufa (Rafinesque, 1817): found along coastal Washington, all the way down through Oregon to Northern California

== Description ==
Mountain beavers are usually dark gray or brown, but their fur can range from slightly more reddish (rufa) to more blackish depending on subspecies, with a light patch under each ear. The animals have distinctively short tails. Adults weigh about 500–900 g (18–32 oz), with a few specimens topping 1,000 g (35 oz). Total length is about 30–50 cm (12–20 in), with a tail length of 1–4 cm (0.39–1.57 in). Their superficial similarity with true beavers reflects only their relatively large size (for rodents), strong odor, preference for living in extremely watery / moist habitats, and propensity to gnaw bark and cut branches. Mountain beavers do not fell trees, build dams, live in lodges, or communicate by slapping their tails (their tail is minute). They are predominantly nocturnal and crepuscular in above ground activities. They are known to climb trees a few meters to acquire food in the form of branches and leaves, but otherwise their diet consists mostly of ferns, especially species that are toxic to other animals.

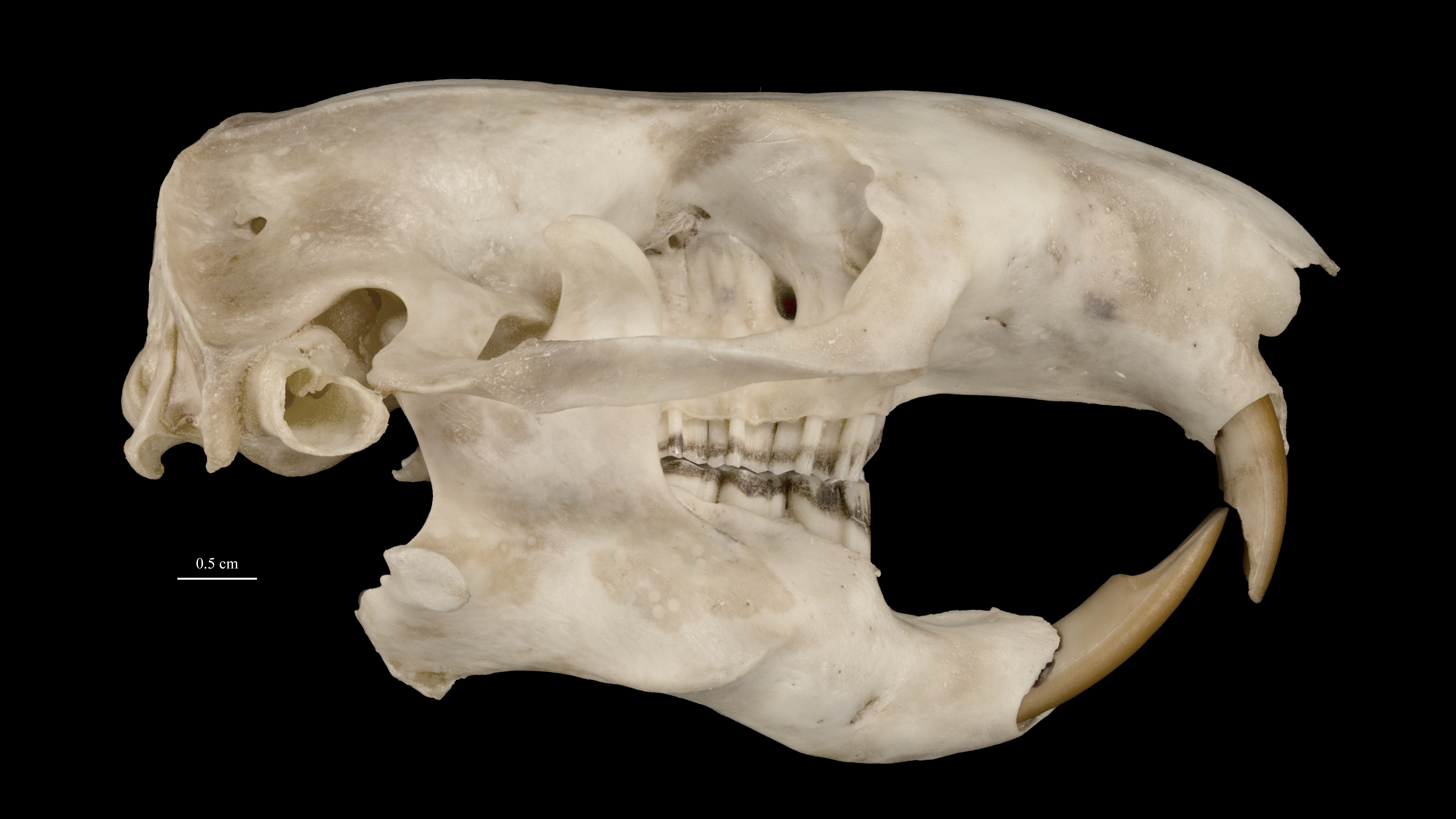
Skull of a mountain beaver

The skull is protrogomorphous; it has no specialized attachments for the masseter muscles as seen in other rodents. It is flattened and lacks a postorbital process. The baculum is thin and distinctly forked. The penis is about 4.5 cm (1.8 in) in length. The male does not have a true scrotum, but the testes move into a position called semiscrotal during the breeding season.

Mountain beavers have an unusual projection on each molar and premolar tooth, which is unique among mammals and allows for easy identification of teeth. This projection points toward the cheek on the upper tooth row, but points toward the tongue on the lower. The cheek teeth lack the complex folds of other rodents and instead consist of single basins. They are hypsodont and ever-growing. Two upper and one lower premolars are present, along with all the molars, giving a dental formula of 1.0.2.31.0.1.3.

Mountain beavers cannot produce concentrated urine. They are thought to be physiologically restricted to the temperate rain forest regions of the North American Pacific coast and moist microenvironments inland due to their inability to obtain sufficient water in more arid environments. It is thought that Aplodontia prefer vegetation high in water content due to their poor ability to concentrate urine which makes it necessary to consume large amounts of water daily.

== Habitat and distribution ==
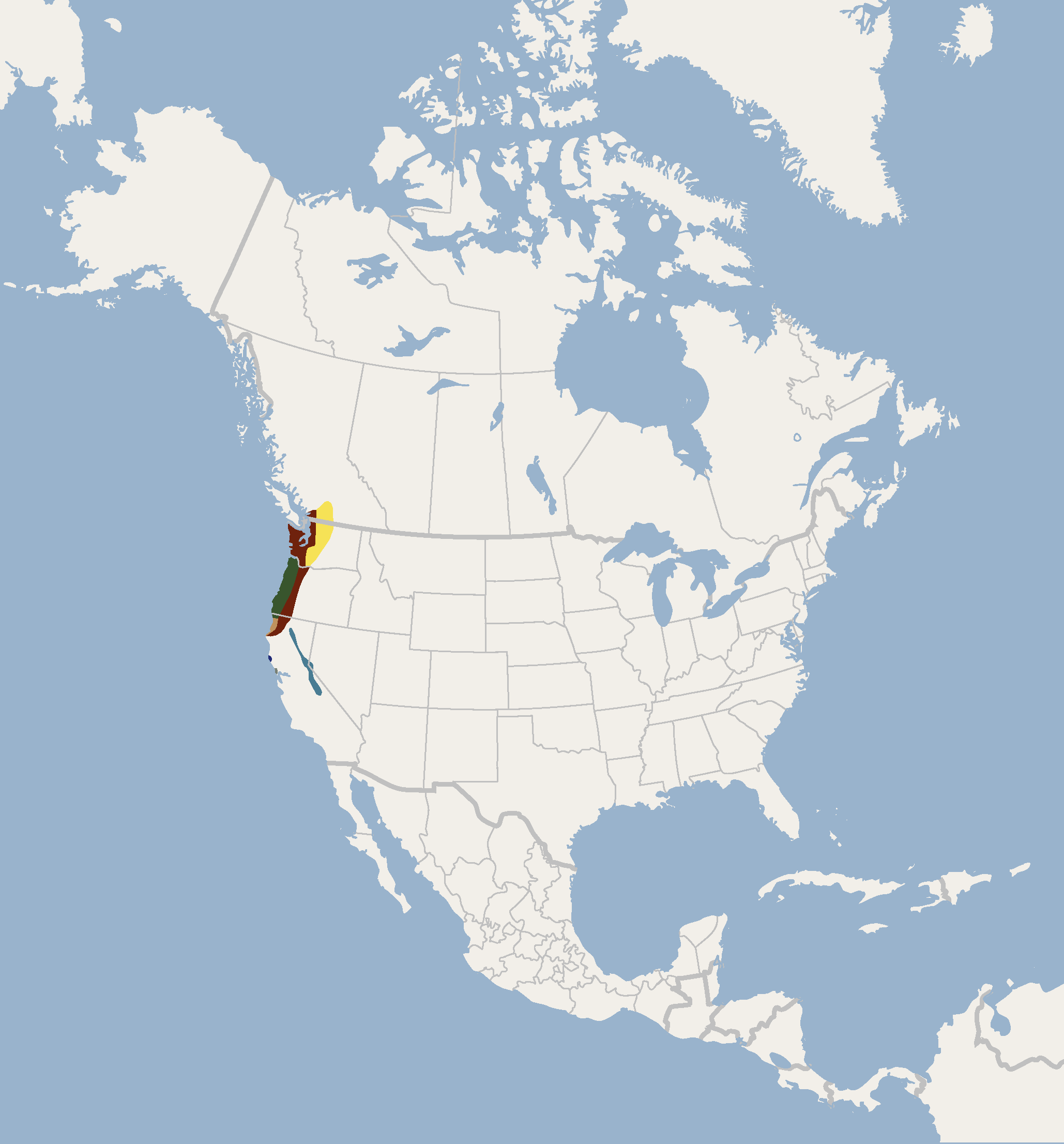
Distribution of subspecies in North America. A.r.rufa A.r.californiana A.r.humboldtiana A.r.nigra A.r.pacifica A.r.phaea A.r.rainieri

Mountain beavers are found in the Cascade Mountains of British Columbia and southward including the rest of the Cascade Range in the United States, the Olympic Mountains and Coast Ranges of Washington and Oregon, plus the Klamath Mountains, and the Sierra Nevada, Point Arena and Pt. Reyes of California and extreme western Nevada. They range from sea level to the tree line. They can be found in both deciduous and coniferous forests, but throughout most of the range they appear to prefer the former.

== Behavior ==
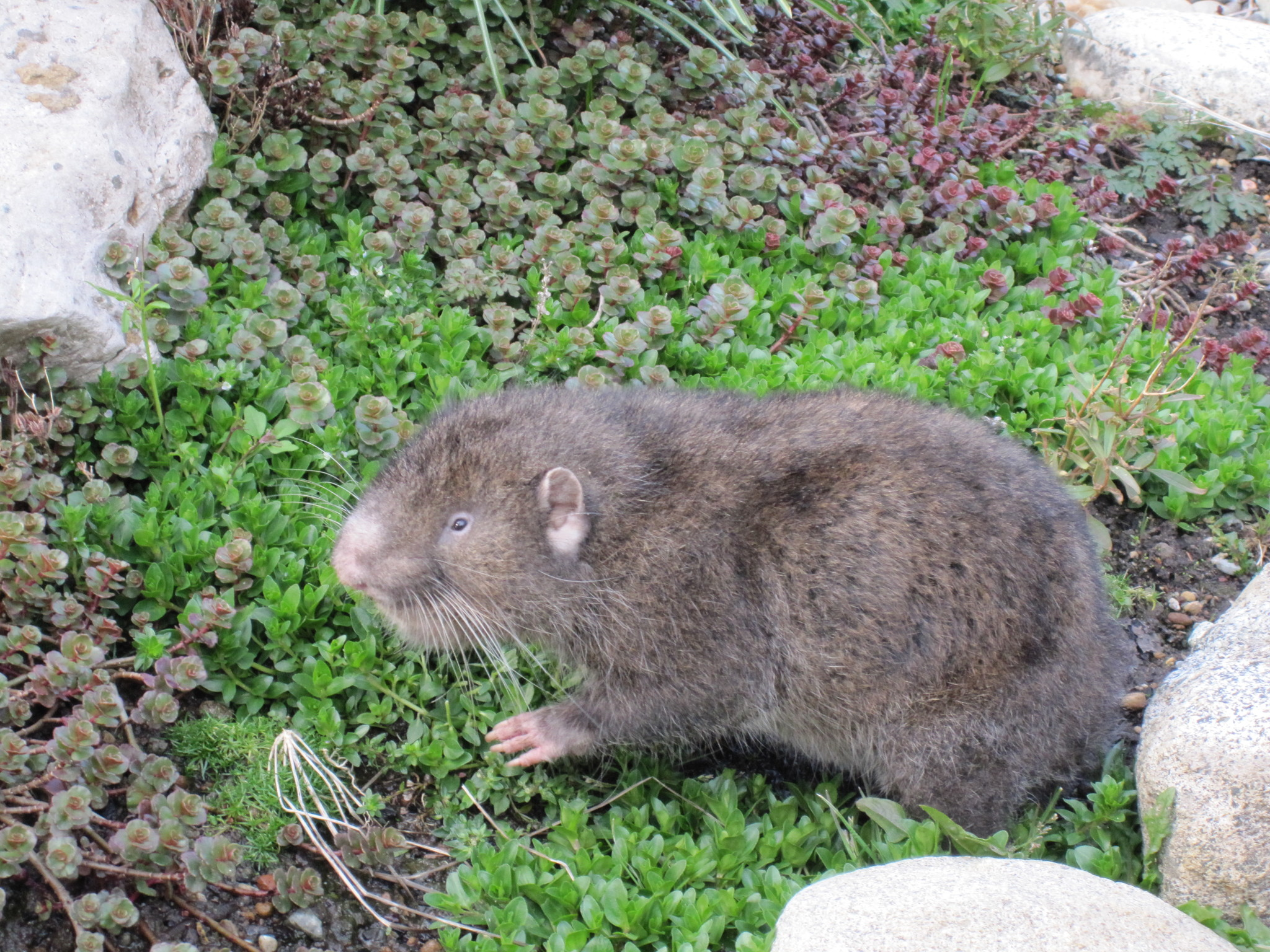
A mountain beaver in Washington state

Mountain beavers are capable of climbing trees, but rarely travel far from burrows. Their thumbs are slightly opposable and the animals will sit on their hindquarters and manipulate food with their forelimbs and incisors. Mountain beavers are asocial and generally do not live in shared burrows. Burrows usually consist of a network of tunnels built in deep soil. The entrances to these burrows often contain clumps of wilted vegetation which the animal likely uses as a kind of food cache as well as a source of nesting material. Mountain beavers seldom travel more than a few meters from their burrow entrances, taking advantage of the protection such burrows offer from predators, such as cougars and owls (though skunks and weasels that also occupy mountain beaver burrows and tunnels may take nestlings as food). They appear to build hay mounds at some burrow entrances, but whether this behavior is related to water regulation, curing food, or gathering nest materials is debated. Mountain beavers are partially nocturnal, spending more time active at night than the day but still active during both periods. They actively feed in periods of up to 2 hours and 45 minutes throughout the day with 6 or 7 periods of feeding per day. In total they forage for up to 9 hours per day. These animals are physiologically limited to moist microenvironments, with most subspecies occurring only in regions with minimal snowfall and cool winters. They do not appear to be able to conserve body heat or warmth as efficiently as other rodents, nor do they hibernate.

== Diet ==
They exhibit coprophagy and eat soft fecal pellets to obtain maximum nutrients; hard fecal pellets are transferred to fecal chambers located within the burrow system. Food includes fleshy herbs and young shoots of more woody plants. Ferns probably make up the bulk of their diets. They appear to be strictly herbivorous. Their consumption of seedling trees has led some to consider them as pests.

== Ecology ==
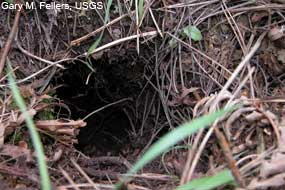
Mountain beaver burrow

Known predators include bobcats, coyotes, weasels, cougars, golden eagles, and owls.

Among the parasites of the mountain beaver is the largest flea known, Hystrichopsylla schefferi. Females of this flea can be 8 mm (0.31 in) long.

Mountain beavers are considered pests in areas of the Pacific Northwest because of the extensive damage they cause to forest trees due to basal-grinding (removal of bark), branch cutting, or clipping small saplings and seedlings. This damage often poses a problem for forest management and reforestation when smaller seedlings are buried or uprooted during mountain beaver feeding and can result in tree deformities, growth suppression, and mortality. The United States Forest Service has maintained a program to locally exterminate the mountain beaver due to beavers causing economic damage to commercial reforestation. Damage control measures taken to protect forest trees by controlling the mountain beaver population include trapping, placing toxic baits, and placing physical barriers (e.g., plastic mesh tubes) around the base of an individual tree.

== Breeding ==
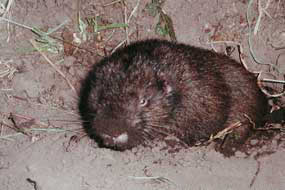
Immature mountain beaver

The breeding season is between January and March, with two or three young born February to April. The ovulation period lasts a few weeks and gestation lasts for a month. The young are born hairless, pink, and blind. They are weaned at 6 to 8 weeks and leave the burrow soon after. Lifespans are 5 to 10 years – fairly long for rodents. They are not social, though home ranges can overlap. While mountain beavers are generally solitary creatures, they may form groups due to suitable habitat and food resources being in a small area; population densities vary widely because of this.

== Status and conservation ==
The IUCN lists the mountain beaver as a species of least concern. However, one subspecies, the Point Arena mountain beaver (A. r. nigra) of California, is considered endangered by the U.S. Fish and Wildlife Service, and Critically Imperiled by NatureServe. Originally listed in 1991, the Point Arena mountain beaver is distinguished by its black colouration and by characteristic body proportions, including a smaller overall size. The principal threat to this subspecies is habitat loss and fragmentation; its remaining range comprises a disjunct region of 24 square miles (62 km^{2}) in western Mendocino County.
