= Montanatylopus =

Montanatylopus Temporal range: late Eocene (Chadronian 2)

Scientific classification
- Kingdom: Animalia
- Phylum: Chordata
- Class: Mammalia
- Order: Artiodactyla
- Family: †Oromerycidae
- Genus: †Montanatylopus; Prothero, 1986

Type species
- Montanatylopus matthewi Prothero, 1986

Extinct genus of mammals

Montanatylopus is an extinct genus of oromerycid from the late Eocene (Chadronian 2) of Montana and New Mexico. It contains a single species, Montanatylopus matthewi. Like other oromerycids, it was an early relative of camels with a relatively short neck and legs.

Montanatylopus is one of the largest and most complete oromerycids, with a skull around 19.2 centimetres (7.6 in) long. Though clearly an oromerycid, it converges closer to camels in several regards, such as its more hypsodont (higher-crowned) teeth and slender limbs. The holotype of Montanatylopus is a nearly complete skeleton, discovered in 1938 by Carnegie Museum paleontologist J. Leroy Kay. It is from the McCarty's Mountain local fauna, in the Renova Formation of Madison County, Montana. A partial lower jaw similar to Montanatylopus was also found in the Rubio Peak Formation of New Mexico.
