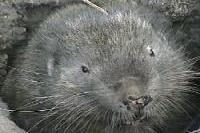
- Mountain beaver (Aplodontia rufa)

Scientific classification
- Kingdom: Animalia
- Phylum: Chordata
- Class: Mammalia
- Order: Rodentia
- Suborder: Sciuromorpha
- Infraorder: Protrogomorpha
- Family: Aplodontiidae; Brandt, 1855

Genera
- See text
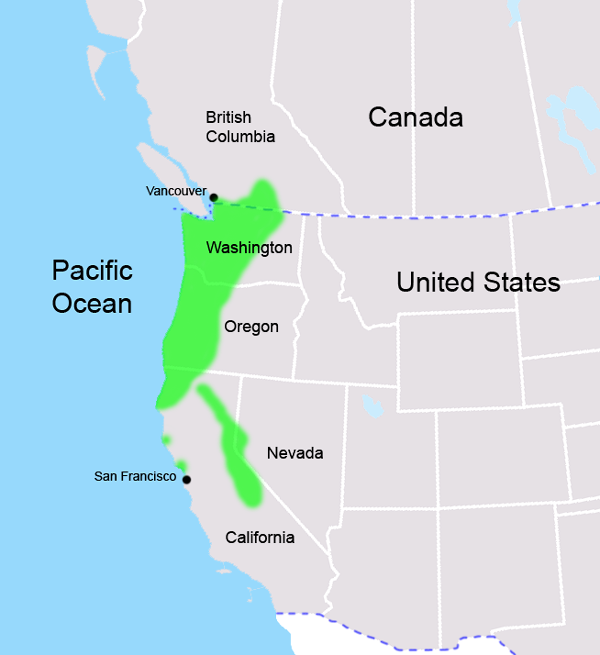
- Aplodontiidae distribution

= Aplodontiidae =

Aplodontiidae Temporal range: Oligocene to present

Family of rodents

The family Aplodontiidae also known as Aplodontidae, Haplodontiidae or Haploodontini is traditionally classified as the sole extant family of the infraorder Protrogomorpha. It may be the sister family of the Sciuridae. There are fossils from the Oligocene until Miocene in Asia, from Oligocene in Europe and from the Oligocene until the present in North America, where there is the only living species: the mountain beaver (Aplodontia rufa).

== Systematics ==
It includes the following genera:

- Aplodontia Richardson, 1829
- †Altasciurus Korth, 2019
- †Ameniscomys Dehm, 1950
- †Ansomys Qiu, 1987
- †Dakotallomys Tedrow and Korth, 1999
- †Disallomys Korth, 2009
- †Ephemeromys Wang & Heissig, 1984
- †Haplomys Miller and Gidley, 1918
- †Leptoromys Tedrow and Korth, 1997
- †Liodontia Miller and Gidley, 1918
- †Meniscomys Cope, 1879
- †Niglarodon Black, 1961
- †Ninamys Vianey-Liaud, Rodrigues & Marivaux, 2013
- †Oligopetes Heissig, 1979
- †Paracitellus Dehm, 1950
- †Paransomys Vianey-Liaud, Rodrigues & Marivaux, 2013
- †Proansomys Bi, Meng, McLean, Wu, Ni & Ye, 2013
- †Prosciurus Matthew, 1910
- †Pseudaplodon Miller, 1927
- †Sciurodon Schlosser, 1884
- †Selenomys Matthew and Granger, 1923
- †Sewelleladon Shotwell, 1958
- †Tardontia Shotwell, 1958
- †Trigonomys Heissig, 1979
