= Cylindrodontidae =

Cylindrodontidae Temporal range: Eocene to mid-Oligocene

Scientific classification
- Kingdom: Animalia
- Phylum: Chordata
- Class: Mammalia
- Infraclass: Placentalia
- Order: Rodentia
- Family: †Cylindrodontidae; Miller & Gidley, 1918

Genera
- see text.

Extinct family of rodents

Cylindrodontidae is a family of extinct rodents from the Eocene to Oligocene of North America and Asia. They were an early-diverging group of rodents with relatively short, broad skulls. As with other early rodents such as Ischyromyidae, the exact affinities of cylindrodontids are unclear. The oldest cylindrodontid (Tuscahomys) is from the Wasatchian NALMA (early Eocene), while the youngest members of the family are from the Whitneyan (mid-Oligocene).

Postcranial fossils have only been described for Pareumys, which appears to have a generalized lifestyle without any strong adaptations for burrowing or climbing. Conversely, cylindrodontid skulls are similar to burrowing rodents. Over the course of their evolution, cylindrodontids show a general trend of increasing size (from mouse-sized to ground squirrel-sized), more robust build, broader and more curved incisors, and more hypsodont cheek teeth.

In North America, cylindrodontid distribution is closely correlated with fossils of certain broad-leafed trees, particularly members of the fig family (Moraceae), legumes (Fabaceae), elms (Ulmaceae), and Platycarya. This may indicate a preference for nutritious, easily-acquired fruits and nuts, in contrast to later rodents such as squirrels, which are better-adapted for processing pine cones.

== List of genera ==
- incertae sedis
  - Anomoemys
  - Dawsonomys
  - Gobiocylindrodon
  - Lophicylindrodon
  - Orientocylindrodon
  - Presbymys
  - Proardynomys
  - Sespemys
  - Siouxlindrodon
  - Tuscahomys
- Subfamily Cylindrodontinae
  - Ardynomys
  - Cylindrodon
  - Dolocylindrodon
  - Pseudocylindrodon
- Subfamily Jaywilsonomyinae (polyphyletic?)
  - Jaywilsonomys
  - Mysops
  - Pareumys
