= Prosciurus =

Prosciurus Temporal range: 37.2 to 15.97 Ma

Scientific classification
- Kingdom: Animalia
- Phylum: Chordata
- Class: Mammalia
- Order: Rodentia
- Family: Aplodontiidae
- Genus: †Prosciurus; Matthew, 1910

Extinct genus of rodents

Prosciurus is an extinct genus of rodents in the family of Aplodontiidae.

== Description ==
In terms of both their morphology and their relative size, the endocasts of P. relictus and P. aff. saskatchewanensis are both more similar to that of arboreal squirrels than that of later aplodontiids.
