= Ctenophthalmidae =

Scientific classification
- Domain: Eukaryota
- Kingdom: Animalia
- Phylum: Arthropoda
- Class: Insecta
- Order: Siphonaptera
- Superfamily: Hystrichopsylloidea
- Family: Ctenophthalmidae

Family of fleas

Ctenophthalmidae is a family of fleas belonging to the order Siphonaptera.

Genera:

- Actenophthalmus Fox, 1925
- Euctenophthalmus Wagner, 1940
- Medioctenophthalmus Hopkins & Rothschild, 1966
- Palaeoctenophthalmus Wagner, 1940
- Peusianapsylla Beaucournu & Wunderlich, 2001
- Spalacoctenophthalmus Wagner, 1940
