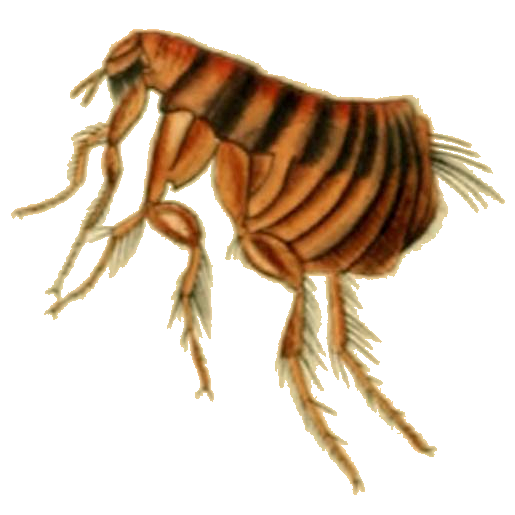
- British Entomologycutted Plate114

Scientific classification
- Domain: Eukaryota
- Kingdom: Animalia
- Phylum: Arthropoda
- Class: Insecta
- Order: Siphonaptera
- Family: Hystrichopsyllidae

= Hystrichopsyllidae =

Family of fleas

Hystrichopsyllidae is a family of fleas in the order Siphonaptera. There are at least 40 genera and 610 described species in Hystrichopsyllidae.

== Genera ==
- Acedestia
- Adoratopsylla
- Agastopsylla
- Anomiopsyllus
- Atyphloceras
- Callistopsyllus
- Carteretta
- Catallagia
- Chiliopsylla
- Conorhinopsylla
- Corrodopsylla
- Corypsylla
- Ctenoparia
- Ctenophthalmus
- Delotelis
- Dinopsyllus
- Doratopsylla
- Eopsylla
- Epitedia
- Genoneopsylla
- Hystrichopsylla
- Idilla
- Jordanopsylla
- Listropsylla
- Liuopsylla
- Megarthroglossus
- Meringis
- Nearctopsylla
- Neopsylla
- Neotyphloceras
- Palaeopsylla
- Paraneopsylla
- Paratyphloceras
- Phalacropsylla
- Rhadinopsylla
- Rothschildiana
- Stenischia
- Stenistomera
- Stenoponia
- Strepsylla
- Tamiophila
- Trichopsylloides
- Typhloceras
- Wagnerina
- Wenzella
- Xenodaeria
