= 2011 in paleomammalogy =

This paleomammalogy list records new fossil mammal taxa that were described during the year 2011, as well as notes other significant paleomammalogy discoveries and events which occurred during that year.

== Newly named taxa ==
Name	Novelty	Status	Authors	Age	Unit	Location	Notes	Images
Cronopio	Gen. et sp.	Valid	Rougier; Apesteguía; Gaetano	Cenomanian	Candeleros Formation	Argentina	A "saber-toothed" dryolestoid.	
Crusafontia amoae	Species	Disputed	Cuenca-Bescós; Badiola; et al. (Note: Cuenca-Bescós, Badiola, Canudo, Gasca and Moreno-Azanza.)	Hauterivian to Barremian		Spain	A dryolestidan mammal. Martin et al. (2021) considered it a junior synonym of Crusafontia cuencana.	
Guggenheimia crocheti	Sp. nov	Valid	Oliveira & Goin	Itaboraian	Itaboraí Basin	Brazil	A protodidelphid "ameridelphian", a species of Guggenheimia.	
Iberica	Gen. et sp.	Valid	Badiola; Canudo; Cuenca-Bescós	Hauterivian/Barremian	Galve	Spain	A eobaatarid or a possible plagiaulacid multituberculate.	
Invictokoala	Gen. et sp.	Valid	Price; Hocknull	Middle Pleistocene		Australia	A Koala.	
Liaoconodon	Gen. et sp.	Valid	Meng; Wang; Li	Aptian	Jiufotang Formation	China	An "eutriconodont".	
Lutreolina materdei	Species	Valid	Goin & de los Reyes	Late Miocene (Huayquerian)		Peru	A relative of lutrine opossum.	
Malleodectes	Gen. et 2 sp.	Valid	Arena et al.	Miocene	Riversleigh World Heritage Area	Australia	A member of Dasyuromorphia of uncertain phylogenetic placement. The type species is M. mirabilis; genus also includes M. moenia.	
Naraboryctes	Gen. et sp.	Valid	Archer; Beck; et al. (Note: Archer, Beck, Gott, Hand, Godthelp, Black.)	Early Miocene		Australia	A marsupial mole.	
Oklatheridium minax	Species	Valid	Davis; Cifelli	Aptian-Albian	Antlers Formation	USA	A deltatheroidan mammal.	
Peradectes coprexeches	Species	Valid	Williamson; Taylor	Early Paleocene	Nacimiento Formation	United States	A peradectid metatherian, a species of Peradectes.	
Periprotodidelphis	Gen. et sp. nov	Valid	Oliveira & Goin	Itaboraian	Itaboraí Basin	Brazil	A protodidelphid "ameridelphian". The type species is Periprotodidelphis bergqvistae.	
Sairadelphys	Gen. et sp. nov	Valid	Oliveira et al.	Pleistocene		Brazil	A relative of Kalinowski's mouse opossum. The type species is Sairadelphys tocantinensis.	
Sineleutherus issedonicus	Species	Valid	Averianov; Lopatin; Krasnolutskii	Bathonian	Itat Formation	Russia	A haramiyidan allotherian.	
Swaindelphys encinensis	Species	Valid	Williamson; Taylor	Early Paleocene	Nacimiento Formation	United States	A herpetotheriid metatherian, a species of Swaindelphys.	
Swaindelphys johansoni	Species	Valid	Williamson; Taylor	Early Paleocene	Nacimiento Formation	United States	A herpetotheriid metatherian, a species of Swaindelphys.	

== Newly named eutherians ==
Name	Novelty	Status	Authors	Age	Unit	Location	Notes	Images
Adelpharctos ginsburgi	Sp. nov	Valid	de Bonis	Late Oligocene		France	A hemicyonine bear, a species of Adelpharctos.	
Aegyptocetus	Gen. et sp.	Valid	Bianucci; Gingerich	Middle Eocene	Gebel Hof Formation	Egypt	A protocetid cetacean.	
Agriarctos beatrix	Sp. nov	Valid	Abella, Montoya & Morales	Middle Miocene	Calatayud-Daroca Basin	Spain	An ailuropodine bear, originally described as a species of Agriarctos. It was later made the type species of the genus Kretzoiarctos.	
Agriotherium myanmarensis	Sp. nov	Valid	Ogino et al.	Late Miocene to early Pliocene		Myanmar	A bear, a species of Agriotherium.	
Alilepus elongatus	Sp. nov	Valid	Winkler; Flynn; Tomida	Late Miocene	Dhok Pathan Formation	Pakistan	A leporid lagomorph, a species of Alilepus.	
Alilepus meini	Sp. nov	Valid	Angelone; Rook	Miocene (early Messinian)		Italy	A leporid lagomorph, a species of Alilepus.	
Antarctodon	Gen. et sp.	Valid	Bond; Kramarz; et al. (Note: Bond, Kramarz, MacPhee, Reguero.)	Late Ypresian	La Meseta Formation	Antarctica	An astrapotherian.	
Arazamys	Gen. et sp. nov	Valid	Rinderknecht, Bostelmann & Ubilla	Late Miocene (Huayquerian)	Camacho Formation	Uruguay	A dinomyid rodent. The type species is Arazamys castiglionii.	
Asilifelis	Gen. et sp. nov	Valid	Werdelin	Lower Miocene	Hiwegi Formation	Kenya	A felid. The type species is Asilifelis coteae.	
Basirepomys romensis	Sp. nov	Valid	Korth	Late Miocene (Hemphillian)		United States	A cricetid rodent, a species of Basirepomys.	
Betonnia	Gen. et sp.	Valid	Williamson; Weil; Standhardt	Middle/Late Puercan	Nacimiento Formation	USA	A cimolestid cimolesta.	
Balochititanops	Gen. et sp.	Valid	Missiaen; Gunnell; Gingerich	Ypresian	Ghazij Formation	Pakistan	A brontotheriid.	
Brachygaulus	Gen. et 3 sp. nov	Valid	Korth; Tabrum	Early Oligocene (Orellan)		United States	A rodent related to mylagaulids and the mountain beaver. The type species is Brachygaulus nicholsi; genus also contains Brachygaulus leistneri and Brachygaulus xerobothrus.	
Caviodon cuyano	Species	Valid	Vucetich; Deschamps; et al. (Note: Vucetich, Deschamps, Morgan and Forasiepi.)	Late Miocene or Pliocene.	Aisol Formation	Argentina	A cardiomyine rodent, a species of Caviodon.	
Cernictis repenningi	Sp. nov	Valid	Baskin	Miocene (middle Hemphillian)	Bidahochi Formation	United States	A galictine mustelid, a species of Cernictis.	
Chacomylus	Gen. et sp.	Valid	Williamson; Weil	Paleocene	Nacimiento Formation	USA	A hyopsodontid condylarth.	
Chacopterygus	Gen. et sp.	Valid	Williamson; Weil; Standhardt	Middle Puercan	Nacimiento Formation	USA	A cimolestid cimolesta.	
Coelodonta thibetana	Species	Valid	Deng; Wang; et al. (Note: Deng, Wang, Fortelius, Li, Wang, Tseng, Takeuchi, Saylor, Säilä, Xie)	Middle Pliocene		China	Woolly rhinoceros.	
Comahuetherium	Gen. et sp.	Valid	Kramarz; Bond	Colhuehuapian	Cerro Bandera Formation	Argentina	An astrapotheriid.	
Cryptobune	Gen. et sp. nov	Valid	Sigé	Paleogene	Quercy Phosphorites Formation	France	A bat. Genus includes new species C. thevenini.	
Cynthiacetus peruvianus	Species	Valid	Martínez-Cáceres; Muizon	Late Eocene-Early Oligocene	Otuma Formation	Peru	A basilosaurid cetacean.	Cynthiacetus
Delotrochanter	Gen. et 3 sp. nov.	Valid	Hunt	Arikareean		USA	A temnocyonine. The type species is Delotrochanter oryktes; genus also contains D. petersoni and D. major	
Democricetodon sui	Sp. nov	Valid	Maridet et al.	Early Miocene	Junggar Basin	China	A rodent belonging to the family Cricetidae.	
Diplacodon gigan	Species	Valid	Mihlbachler	Middle Eocene	Wiggins Formation	USA	A brontotheriid.	
Enhydriodon dikikae	Sp. nov	Valid	Geraads et al.	Pliocene		Ethiopia	An otter.	
Eoconodon hutchisoni	Sp. nov	Valid	Clemens	Early Paleocene (Puercan)	Tullock Formation	United States	A triisodontid, a species of Eoconodon.	
Eotitanops pakistanensis	Species	Valid	Missiaen; Gunnell; Gingerich	Ypresian	Ghazij Formation	Pakistan	A brontotheriid.	Eotitanops
Equus (Sussemionus) ovodovi	Sp. nov	Valid	Eisenmann; Sergej	Late Pleistocene		China; Russia	A species of Equus.	
Eumys euryodus	Sp. nov	Valid	Korth	Oligocene (Whitneyan)		United States	A cricetid rodent, a species of Eumys.	
Euprox altus	Sp. nov	Valid	Wang; Zhang	Middle Miocene	Damiao Formation	China	A deer.	
Gobicricetodon filippovi	Sp. nov	Valid	Sen; Erbajeva	Middle Miocene		Russia	A rodent belonging to the family Cricetidae and the subfamily Cricetodontinae.	
Griphotherion	Gen. et sp.	Valid	López; Powell	Eocene		Argentina	A rodent-like notoungulate.	
Hiskatherium	Gen. et sp.	Valid	Pujos; Iuliis; Quispe	Santacrucian		Bolivia	A small ground sloth.	
Homotherium venezuelensis	Sp. nov	Valid	Rincón; Prevosti; Parra	Pleistocene	Mesa Formation	Venezuela	A machairodontine felid, a species of Homotherium.	
Hystrix paukensis	Species	Valid	Yuichiro Nishioka; Zin-Maung-Maung-Thein; et al. (Note: Naoko Egi, Takehisa Tsubamoto, Takeshi Nishimura, Tsuyoshi Ito, Thaung-Htike and Masanaru Takai.)	late Miocene/early Pliocene		Burma	new species in the genus Hystrix (Old World porcupine).	
Jacobsomys dailyi	Sp. nov	Valid	May et al.	Miocene (late Hemphillian)	Horned Toad Formation	United States	A cricetid rodent. Originally described as species of Jacobsomys; Rincón et al. (2016) transferred it to the genus Postcopemys.	
Juramaia	Gen. et sp.	Valid	Luo; Yuan; et al. (Note: Luo, Yuan, Meng, Ji.)	Callovian to Bathonian	Tiaojishan Formation	China	A basal eutherian. The type species is Juramaia sinensis.	
Karydomys debruijni	Species	Valid	Maridet et al.	Early Miocene		China	A cricetid, a species of Karydomys.	
Khoratpithecus ayeyarwadyensis	Species	Valid	Jaeger; Soe; et al. (Note: Jaeger, Soe, Chavasseau, Coster, Emonet, Guy, Lebrum, Maung, Shwe, Tun, Rugbumrung, Bocherens, Benammi, Chaivanich, Tafforeau, Chaimanee.)	Late Miocene	Irrawaddy Formation	Myanmar	A hominoid.	Khoratpithecus
Kuntinaru	Gen. et sp.	Valid	Billet; Hautier; et al. (Note: Billet, Hautier, de Muizon, Valentin.)	Deseadan		Bolivia	A dasypodid armadillo.	
Lazibemys	Gen. et sp.	Valid	Marivaux et al.	Eocene	Glib Zegdou Formation	Algeria	A zegdoumyid anomaluromorph rodent. The type species is Lazibemys zegdouensis.	
Lycophocyon	Gen. et sp.	Valid	Tomiya	?Uintan-Duchesnean	Santiago Formation	USA	A caniformian carnivoran.	Lycophocyon
Mammacyon ferocior	Sp. nov.	Valid	Hunt	Mid- or early late Arikareean	Arikaree Group	USA	A temnocyonine, a species of Mammacyon	
Martes ginsburgi	Sp. nov	Valid	Montoya, Morales & Abella	Upper Miocene		Spain	A marten.	
Megacricetodon beijiangensis	Species	Valid	Maridet et al.	Early Miocene		China	A cricetid, a species of Megacricetodon.	
Megapeomys repenningi	Sp. nov	Valid	Tomida	Early Miocene	Nakamura Formation	Japan	An apeomyine eomyid rodent, a species of Megapeomys.	
Mescalerolemur	Gen. et sp.	Valid	Kirk; Williams	Uintan	Devil's Graveyard Formation	USA	An adapiform strepsirrhini.	
Mesolambdolophus	Gen. et sp.	Valid	Holbrook; Lapergola	Bridgerian North American Stage	Bridger Formation	USA	A small odd-toed ungulate of uncertain phylogenetic position, possibly related to Tapiromorpha. The type species is Mesolambdolophus setoni.	
Mesoprocta	Gen. et sp. nov	Valid	Croft, Chick & Anaya	Middle Miocene		Bolivia	A dasyproctid rodent. The type species is Mesoprocta hypsodus.	
Microcardiodon	Gen. et sp. nov	Valid	Pérez & Vucetich	Middle Miocene		Argentina	A member of Hystricognathi, a cavioid rodent. The type species is Microcardiodon williensis.	
Microtus (Pedomys) parmaleei	Sp. nov	Valid	Martin; Peláez-Campomanes; Honey	Latest Pleistocene		United States	An arvicoline rodent, a species of Microtus.	
Minchenoletes	Gen. et sp. nov	Valid	Wang et al.	Early Eocene	Nomogen Formation	China	A member of Tapiroidea belonging to the family Lophialetidae. The type species is M. erlianensis.	
Mionothropus	Gen. et sp.	Valid	De Iuliis; Gaudin; Vicars	Huayquerian		Peru	A megatheriid sloth.	
Mioparadoxurus	Gen. et sp. nov	Valid	Morales; Pickford	Late Miocene		India	A paradoxurine viverrid. The type species is M. meini.	
Miotomodon	Gen. et sp. nov	Valid	Korth	Late Miocene (Hemphillian)		United States	A cricetid rodent. The type species is Miotomodon mayi.	
Mondegodon	Gen. et sp.	Valid	Tabuce; Clavel; Antunes	Earliest Eocene	Silveirinha Formation	Portugal	A mesonychian. The type species is M. eutrigonus.	
Myaingtherium	Gen. et sp. nov	Valid	Tsubamoto et al.	Late Middle Eocene	Pondaung Formation	Myanmar	A member of the family Anthracotheriidae. The type species is M. kenyapotamoides.	
Nannocricetus wuae	Sp. nov	Valid	Zhang et al.	Late Miocene		China	A hamster.	
Nevadomys	Gen. et 3 sp. nov	Valid	Mou	Pliocene (Blancan)	Panaca Formation	United States	A relative of the long-clawed mole vole. The type species is Nevadomys fejfari; genus also contains Nevadomys lindsayi and Nevadomys downsi.	
Nuralagus	Gen. et sp.	Valid	Quintana; Köhler; Moyà-Solà	Early Pliocene		Spain	A leporid rabbit.	Nuralagus
Ocucajea	Gen. et sp.	Valid	Uhen; Pyenson; et al. (Note: Uhen, Pyenson, Devries, Urbina, Renne.)	Bartonian	Paracas Formation	Peru	A basilosaurid cetacean.	
Oldrichpedetes	Gen. et comb. et 3 sp. nov	Valid	Pickford & Mein	Early Miocene to early Pliocene		Kenya; Namibia; Tunisia	A pedetid rodent, a new genus for "Megapedetes" pickfordi (Mein & Senut, 2003). Genus also contains 3 new species: Oldrichpedetes fejfari, O. brigitteae and O. praecursor.	
Paranotiosorex	Gen. et sp. nov	Valid	Mou	Pliocene	Panaca Formation	United States	A shrew. The type species is Paranotiosorex panacaensis.	
Paronychomys shotwelli	Sp. nov	Valid	Korth	Late Miocene (Hemphillian)		United States	A cricetid rodent. Originally described as a species of Paronychomys; transferred to the separate genus Tsaphanomys by Martin & Zakrzewski (2019).	
Phoxomylus	Gen. et sp.	Valid	Fox	Early Tiffanian	Paskapoo Formation	Canada	A palaechthonid plesiadapiform.	
Pliosaccomys prowitteorum	Sp. nov	Valid	Martin & Mallory	Late Miocene; Hemphillian	Ellensburg Formation	USA; Washington	A pocket gopher, a species of Pliosaccomys.	
Pliospalax complicatus	Sp. nov.	Valid	Şen; Sarica	Miocene		Turkey	A spalacid rodent, a species of Pliospalax.	
Postcopemys	Gen. et 2 sp. et comb. nov	Valid	Lindsay; Czaplewski	Pliocene (late Hemphillian and early Blancan)		Mexico?; United States	A cricetid rodent. The type species is Postcopemys repenningi; genus also contains Postcopemys maxumensis, as well as "Peromyscus" valensis Shotwell (1967) and "Copemys" vasquezi Jacobs (1977).	
Prothomomys	Gen. et sp. nov	Valid	May et al.	Miocene (late Hemphillian)	Horned Toad Formation	United States	A gopher. The type species is Prothomomys warrenensis.	
Protoryx tuvaensis	Species	Valid	Dmitrieva; Serdyuk	Late Miocene		Russia	A bovid.	
Protungulatum coombsi	Species	Valid	Archibald; Zhang; et al. (Note: Archibald, Zhang, Harper and Cifelli)	Maastrichtian	Hell Creek Formation	USA	A species of Protungulatum.	
Quebradahondomys	Gen. et sp. nov	Valid	Croft, Chick & Anaya	Middle Miocene		Bolivia	An adelphomyine spiny rat. The type species is Quebradahondomys potosiensis.	
Repomys minor	Sp. nov	Valid	Mou	Pliocene (early Blancan)	Panaca Formation	United States	A cricetid rodent, a species of Repomys.	
Robertschochia	Nom. nov	Valid	Lucas	Paleocene		United States	Originally described as a genus of taeniodonts and replacement name for Schochia Lucas & Williamson (1993); T. Williamson (2013) reinterpreted this fossil material as remains of taeniodont genus Wortmania.	
Rudiocyon	Gen. et sp. nov.	Valid	Hunt	Arikareean	John Day Formation	USA	A temnocyonine. The type species is Rudiocyon amplidens	
Rusingapedetes	Gen. et sp. nov	Valid	Pickford & Mein	Early Miocene		Kenya	A pedetid rodent. The type species is Rusingapedetes tsujikawai.	
Rytiodus heali	Species	Valid	Domning; Sorbi	Miocene		Libya; Madagascar	A dugongid sirenian, a species of Rytiodus.	
Sicista primus	Sp. nov	Valid	Kimura	Early Miocene (~17 Ma)		China	A birch mouse.	
Sinapospalax berdikensis	Sp. nov.	Valid	Şen; Sarica	Miocene		Turkey	A spalacid rodent, a species of Sinapospalax.	
Supayacetus	Gen. et sp.	Valid	Uhen; Pyenson; et al.	Bartonian	Paracas Formation	Peru	A basilosaurid cetacean.	
Tapirus rondoniensis	Sp. nov	Valid	Holanda, Ferigolo & Ribeiro	Late Pleistocene	Rio Madeira Formation	Brazil	A tapir.	
Tarsius sirindhornae	Sp. nov	Valid	Chaimanee et al.	Middle Miocene	Na Khaem Formation	Thailand	A tarsier.	
Temnocyon fingeruti	Sp. nov.	Valid	Hunt	Latest Oligocene, late mid-Arikareean	John Day Formation	USA	A temnocyonine, a species of Temnocyon	
Temnocyon macrogenys	Sp. nov.	Valid	Hunt	Latest Arikareean	Anderson Ranch Formation	USA	A temnocyonine, a species of Temnocyon	
Temnocyon subferox	Sp. nov.	Valid	Hunt	Early Arikareean	John Day Formation	USA	A temnocyonine, a species of Temnocyon	
Tragelaphus lockwoodi	Sp. nov.	Valid	Reed; Bibi	Pliocene	Hadar Formation	Ethiopia	A species of Tragelaphus.	
Turiasorex	Gen. et sp.	Valid	van Dam; van den Hoek Ostende; Reumer	Middle - Late Miocene		Spain	A short-snouted shrew.	
Umayodus	Gen. et sp.	Valid	Gelfo; Sigé	Late Paleocene/Earliest Eocene	Muñami Formation	Peru	A didolodontid "condylarth".	
