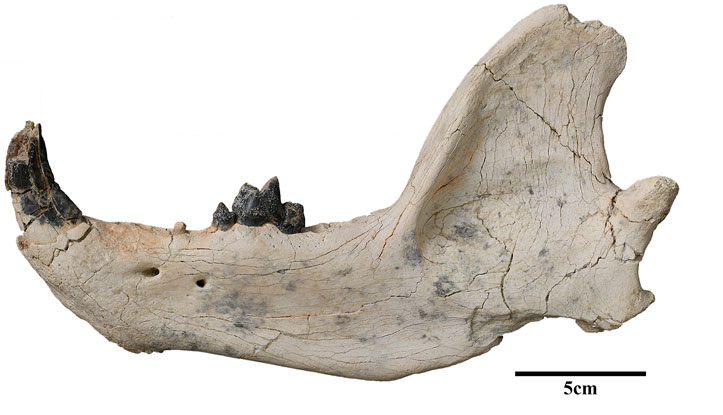
- Mandible of Lonchocyon qiui

Scientific classification
- Kingdom: Animalia
- Phylum: Chordata
- Class: Mammalia
- Order: Carnivora
- Infraorder: Arctoidea
- Genus: Lonchocyon; Zhang et al., 2023

Type species
- †Lonchocyon qiui Zhang et al., 2023

= Lonchocyon =

Lonchocyon Temporal range: Late Eocene

Extinct genus of mammals

Lonchocyon is an extinct genus of arctoid carnivorans, with possible affinities to amphicyonids or hemicyonine bears. It contains a single species, Lonchocyon qiui, known from a single left mandible discovered at the fossil-bearing locality Haerhada at the base of the Baron Sog Formation, which is located in Inner Mongolia, China, and dates to the late Eocene. This taxon is notable for its large size in comparison to other arctoid carnivorans of the Eocene epoch, and for its hypercarnivorous adaptions, most notably its large canine and strongly reduced premolars. The genus name is a combination of Greek lonch, meaning spear and referencing the spear-like paraconid on its lower carnassial, and cyon, meaning dog. The specific name honours Professor Zhan-Xiang Qiu.

== Discovery and naming ==
The holotype and only specimen, IVPP V 28616, is a mostly complete left mandible with some teeth attached. It was collected from the base of the Baron Sog Formation located in Haerhada in Inner Mongolia, China. The fauna of the Formation and the coeval "Middle White" beds of the Erden Obo suggest an Ergilian age.

The generic name comes from the Greek lonch, meaning spear, and cyon, meaning dog. The specific name qiui was given in honour of Professor Zhan-Xiang Qiu for his contributions to the study of carnivoran evolution and systematics.

== Description ==
One of the most distinct features of Lonchocyon is its very deep mandible, with its ramus getting progressively deeper from the first premolar towards the third molar. A distinguishable, but small, marginal process rises from its ventral border. A powerful digastric muscle is inserted in the marginal process, and a shallow depression along the posterior ventral border possibly suggests the presence of a rudimentary premasseteric fossa anterior to the marginal process, extending ventrally towards the first molar. The masseter muscle inserts into a large and deep masseteric fossa. Two mandibular foramina are present, a larger one located ventral to the gap between the second and third premolars, and a smaller one ventral to the anterior border of the fourth premolar. Interdigitated rugosities can be seen on the rough and robust mandibular symphysis, although its posterodorsal corner is comparatively smooth. Its posteriorly inclined coronoid crest broadens in its distal half, and the high and broad coronoid process projects over the anterior border of the robust condyloid process. The latter is composed of two parts with a slightly medially inclined long axis. A narrow triangular depression is present on the lateral side of the wide, but shallow indentation which separates the marginal process from the angular process. The shallow and wide mandibular notch gently curves from the coronoid process to the condyloid process.

While its incisors have not been preserved, their alveoli indicate that the first two incisors are aligned almost longitudinally rather than transversely, and are much smaller than the third one. The large and robust canine is laterally compressed, and resembles that of other arctoids, as it is nearly erect with an oval outline in cross-section. Although the apex of the canine has not been preserved, it was likely recurved distally. A 9.73 mm long diastema separates the canine from the strongly reduced premolars, which are almost unique among hypercarnivorous arctoids, except for the Magericyonini. The premolars are furthermore spaced out, and separated by diastemas. Two closely placed tooth sockets are interpreted as belonging to a single-rooted first and second premolar, respectively, instead of a double-rooted second premolar. The third premolar is also single-rooted, whereas the roots of the fourth one are nearly coalesced. The latter possesses a sharp and pointed main cuspid, with a flat lingual surface and a convex buccal surface, as well as straight and distinct anterior and posterior crests, the former extending anterolingually, the latter posteriorly. However, no accessory or cingulid cuspid is present.

The large spear-like paraconid cusp, which gave Lonchocyon its name, is present on the massive first molar, and composed of three facets. These are bordered by three ridges, which descend from the apex of the paraconid. The first being a posteriorly slanted anterior cristid extending slightly lingually down to the base of the crown, the second a shorter lingual cristid, which descends to the notch between the paraconid and protoconid, and the third is the posterior cristid forming the anterior half of the carnassial blade. The posterior half of the carnassial blade is formed by the preprotocristid, which extends anterobuccally. Alongside the buccal edge of the blade, a slightly worn facet is present. A near-right angle is formed by the notch between two cristids of the blade in buccal view. The highest cuspid on the tooth is the protoconid, which is however smaller than the paraconid in a buccal view. A distinct groove on the occlusal and lingual sides separates the two cusps. A blunt ridge descends from the protoconid to the notch between the paraconid and protoconid on the lingual side, creating a deep V-shaped notch with the lingual cristid of the paraconid, and resulting in the presence of a flat anterior face between the two cristids of the protoconid. The metaconid is only about half as high as the protoconid, to which it is located posterolingually, but almost as tall as the paraconid. The short talonid is slightly narrower than the tall trigonid. They're separated by a distinct groove, which is continuous on the occlusal and buccal surfaces. The talonids lingual surface is vertical, whereas its buccal surface is lingually inclined. A slightly anterolingually extending hypoconid crest lies in the middle of the talonid, and joins the slightly lower entoconid crest on the posterior side. This results in the talonid forming a loop on the occlusal surface. No cingulid is present on the first molar. As the second molar possesses a relatively large alveolus composed of two equal-sized portions, it was likely double-rooted and not reduced. The alveolus of the third molar, however, is much smaller, indicating that it was single-rooted. Overall, the molars decrease in size posteriorly, with the first molar being the largest, and the third the smallest.

== Paleobiology ==
Several features, most notably its deep mandible, robust canine and sectorial trigonid indicate that Lonchocyon was a hypercarnivore. This diet evolved numerous more times among arctoids, with all major amphicyonid subfamilies as well as hemicyonine ursids having hypercarnivorous members. However, the second molar of Lonchocyon is not reduced, unlike that of both Magericyon and the thaumastocyonines, but similar to the condition seen in hemicyonines. But hemicyonines, and most other carnivorous arctoids, except for the Magericyonini, have functional fourth premolars, as opposed to the strongly reduced premolar of Lonchocyon. As Magericyon lacks the coalesced fourth premolar seen in Lonchocyon, and that the two taxa are furthermore strongly temporally separated from each other, it's suggested that their similarities are a result of parallel evolution, and the hypercarnivorous features of Lonchocyon are plesiomorphic and aberrant.

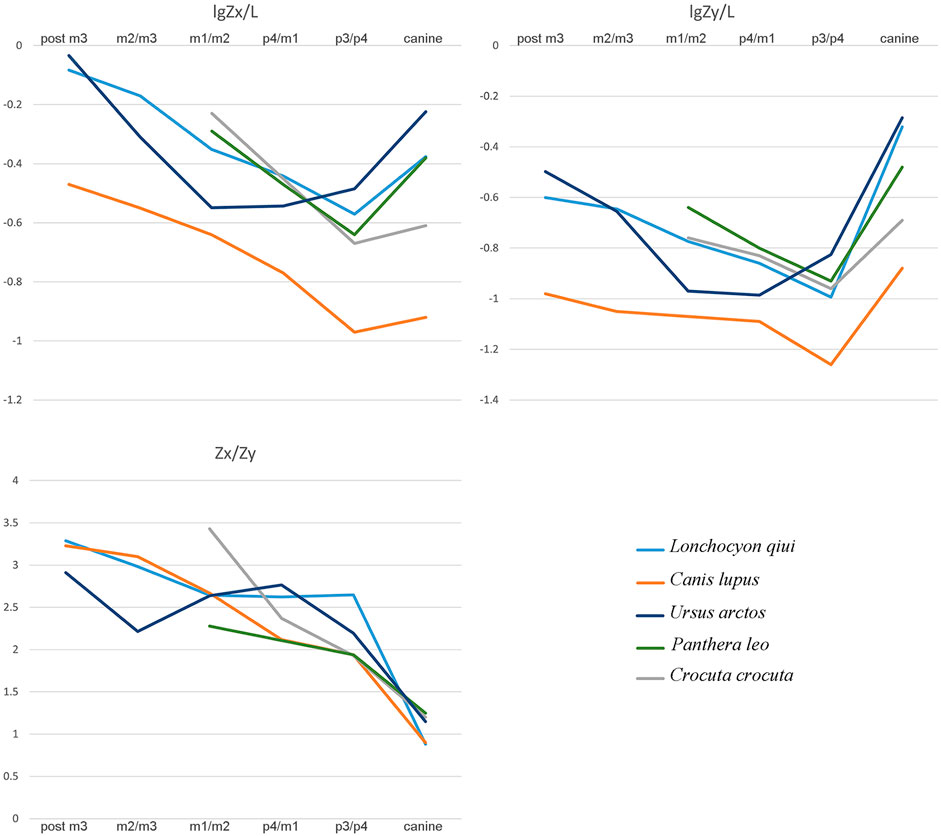
Comparison of the mandibular force profile of Lonchocyon with that of lions, spotted hyaenas, grey wolves and brown bears

The dorsoventral mandibular force profiles (Zx/L) of Lonchocyon is similar to that of canids and amphicyonids, with Zx/L values similar to lions and Ysengrinia tolosana, and higher than that of most other amphicyonids. The values at the canine are also similar to those of lions, and higher than of other compared taxa except for Y. tolosana and brown bears. This suggests that it was capable of delivering powerful canine bites to subdue large preys like big cats do, instead of delivering rapid and shallow bites as pack-hunting canids. The large value indicates that it was capable of withstanding high dorsoventral stresses. Its labiolingual mandibular force profiles (Zy/L), which point toward high labiolingual and torsional stresses, also showcase similarities to that of canids and amphicyonids, though they are lower than the Zx/L values at the same location, except for the canine. The values are very high, generally similar to those of lions, spotted hyaenas and Y. tolosana, higher than that of most amphicyonids, except for Magericyon and Ammitocyon. At the canine, the value even surpasses the lion, indicating that it was capable of withstanding huge labiolingual and torsional stresses while restraining prey with its powerful canine bites. Both the Zx/L and Zy/L values rise gradually along the horizontal ramus posterior to the canine. The relative mandibular force (Zx/Zy) of Lonchocyon almost plateaus from the third premolar to the second molar, corresponding to its sectorial carnassial tooth and reduced premolars. This is a marked difference to that of other caniformes, and indicates they were mainly used to slice meat, and did not need to withstand great buccolingual or torsional stresses. The posterior molars, however, seem to have had the ability to crack harder objects. Overall, Lonchocyon possessed a robust mandibular symphysis, allowing it to deliver canine bites similar to those of lions to subdue prey as large or larger than itself. It has furthermore been suggested that it was a solitary hunter, unlike modern canids.
