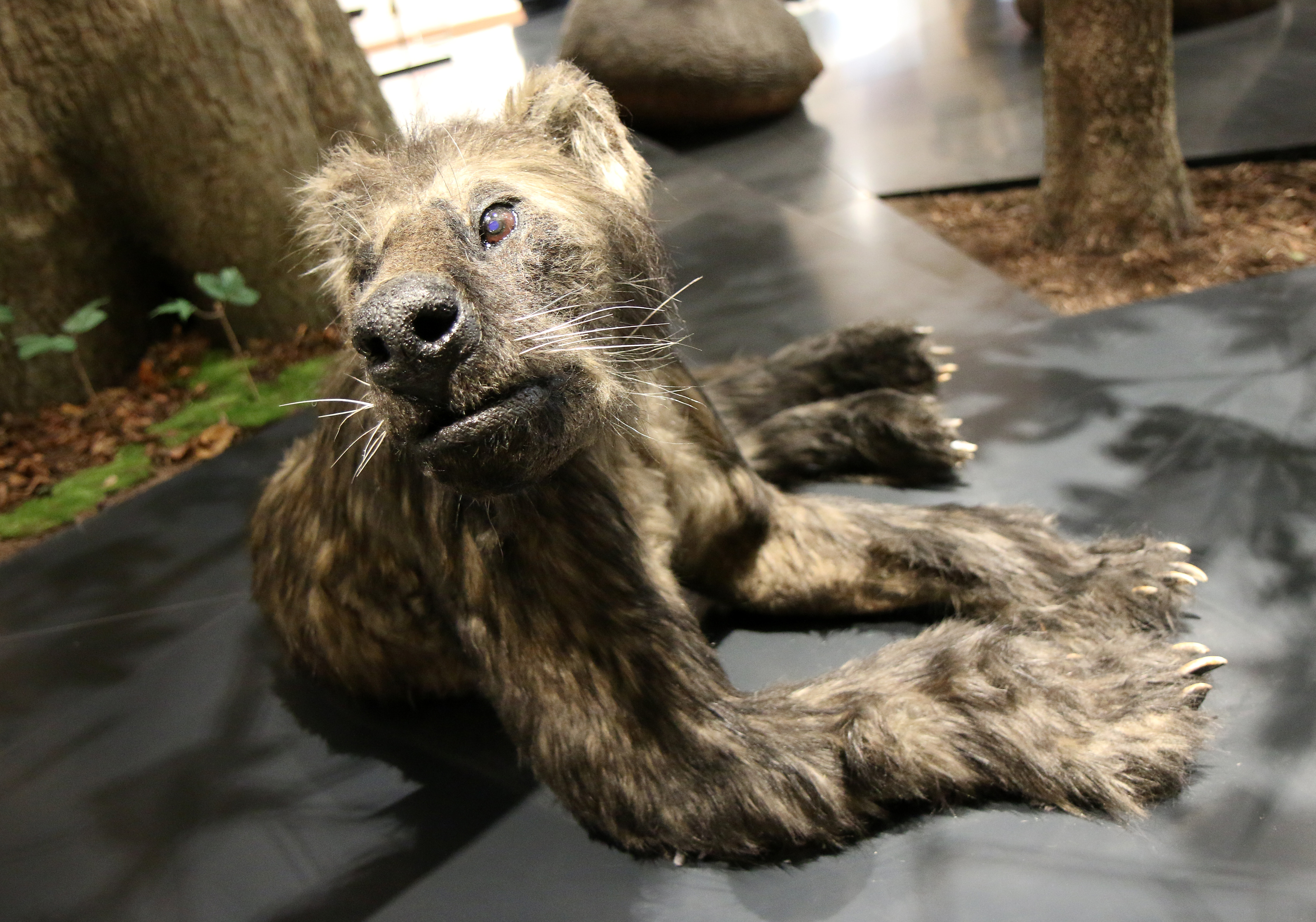
- Agnotherium antiquum reconstruction, Naturhistorisches Museum Mainz

Scientific classification
- Kingdom: Animalia
- Phylum: Chordata
- Class: Mammalia
- Order: Carnivora
- Family: †Amphicyonidae
- Subfamily: †Thaumastocyoninae
- Genus: †Agnotherium; Kaup, 1833

Type species
- †Agnotherium antiquum Kaup, 1833

Synonyms
- Amphicyon agnotus Pomel, 1853; Agnocyon pomeli Kaup, 1861; Vishnucyon chinjiensis? Pilgrim, 1932

= Agnotherium =

Agnotherium Temporal range: Tortonian Late Miocene, 10.8 – 9.7 Ma

Extinct genus of carnivores

Agnotherium is a genus of large sized carnivoran mammals, belonging to the Amphicyonidae ("bear dogs"), which has been found in Western Europe, and possibly China and Pakistan, and lived during the Late Miocene epoch. Despite only being known from fragmentary remains, the genus notable for hypercarnivorous adaptions, which have been said to represent the "apex" of its family.

== History and naming ==
The genus Agnotherium was created by Johann Jakob von Kaup, based on a single molar (HLMD Din 1143) found in the Eppelsheim Formation, better known as the Dinotheriensande, located in southwestern Germany. Kaup, who described many Eppelsheim mammals, including such famous ones as Deinotherium, Machairodus and Chalicotherium, named the fragmentary material Agnotherium antiquum. He noted that he only reason he gave a name to this fragmentary taxon was to "draw naturalists' attention to this genus" since it has teeth unlike any animal he had ever seen before. Over the next 180 years the genus was involved in taxonomic uncertainty, with various material being assigned to it, of which most was later excluded. Kaup himself added to the confusion by renaming his found into "Agnocyon", since the name Agnotherium was "not fitting for a predator". Kuss synonymized the genus Tomocyon with Agnotherium, which led to a second species, A. grivense, being recognized by several authors. This, however, has been disputed since, and Agnotherium is now regarded as monotypic.

In 2017, more material belonging to Agnotherium was unearthed in Eppelsheim, and designated as its paratype (MNHM Epp 117–2017). It consists of a partial mandible of a juvenile, with several teeth being either in eruption or still in the crypt. This find served to clarify the understanding of this obscure genus, and even allowed for a reconstruction, the first of its kind, to be made and displayed in the Naturhistorisches Museum Mainz. The new remains also allowed for the confirmation that several Spanish and Swiss remains should be assigned to this genus, the former including a few isolated teeth (MNCN 79044a-c), the latter a partial mandibular ramus (NMB CM 242) and the fragment of a right ulna (NMB CM 243).

Several remains from Africa, including Kenya and Morocco, have been attributed to Agnotherium, as species A. kiptalami, in the past, but have since been moved to the genus Myacyon. Only material from Tunisia has been tentatively assigned to cf. Agnotherium antiquum by Morlo et al., even though they note their inability to confidently demonstrate that it belongs to the genus, due to the lack of definitive Agnotherium upper teeth to compare them to, while other authors consider it too to belong to Myacyon cf. kiptalami. The Tunisian material consists of a right maxilla fragment (NOM T-370), proximal left radius fragment (NOM T-179) and a metatarsal V (NOM T-2269).

A medium-sized, hypercarnivorous amphicyonid from the Guonigou Fauna of the Linxia Basin has been tentatively assigned to Agnotherium sp.

The name is derived from the Ancient Greek from Greek ἁγνός agnos, "chaste" and θηρίον therium "beast", although it alternatively has been translated as "unknown beast".

== Geographical and temporal distribution ==
European localities where remains of Agnotherium have been discovered

Agnotherium was distributed across Western Europe during the Vallesian epoch, with the genus being mostly temporally restricted to the MN9 zone, although the youngest remains may date to the earliest parts of MN10.

Both the holotype and the paratype were found at the site of Eppelsheim, located in the state Rhineland-Palatinate of southwestern Germany. Agnotherium was found at the youngest deposits of the formation, dating to about 9.7 Ma, and therefore to the boundary of MN9/MN10. The Eppelsheim specimens also represent the youngest material referred to this genus. The locality of Charmoille, located in the canton of Jura, Switzerland, belongs to the Ajoie member of the Bois de Raube formation, and dates to 10.8 ± 0.4 Ma. Pedregueras 2A, located in the Zaragoza Province of Spain, is of similar age at around 10.6 Ma. In Asia, it is known from tentatively assigned material. The Guonigou Fauna, where a skull potentially referrable to Agnotherium has been reported, corresponds to the European MN9. A molar from the Siwaliks of Pakistan has also been assigned to Agnotherium. Discovered at the locality Bhilomar, the fossil had been previously suggested to possess affinities with Magericyon. Barry furthermore suggests that the obscure Vishnucyon chinjiensis, a poorly known amphicyonid with 'thaumastocyonine' characteristics, may also be synonymous with Agnotherium.

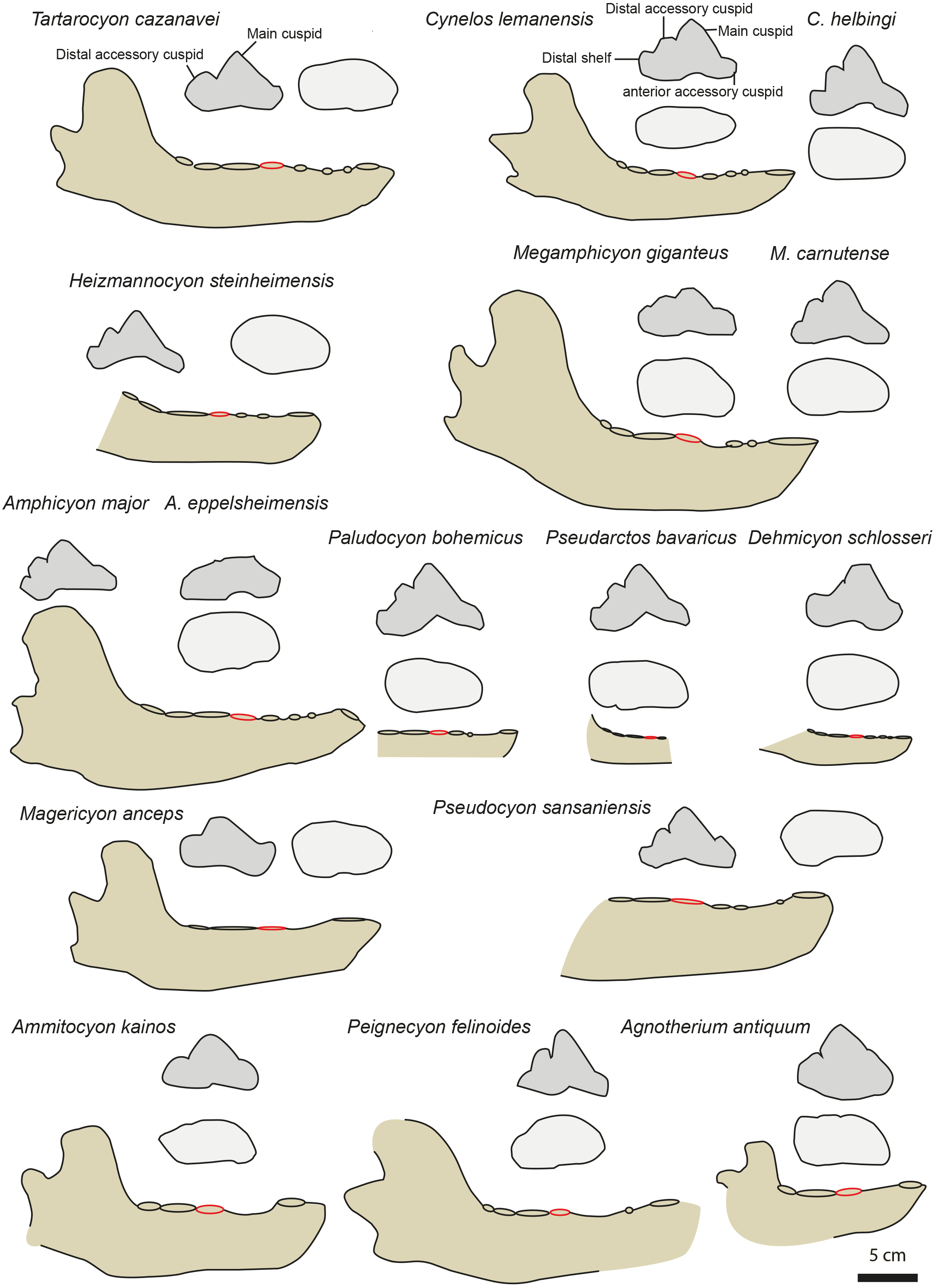
Comparison of the mandibles and fourth premolars between Agnotherium and various other European amphycionids.

== Description ==
Agnotherium antiquum was a lion-sized amphicyonid, with its mass having been estimated at 158 kg and 200 to 275 kg, respectively. This makes it one of the largest carnivorans in its habitat, although smaller than several other amphicyonids, such as Tomocyon, several species of Amphicyon (including the contemporary A. eppelheimensis) and Ischyrocyon.

It differs from all other amphicyonids in the massive reduction of its detention, which is the most trenchant, and therefore specialized to hypercarnivory, of all amphicyonids, with the possible exception of Ammitocyon. The premolars p1, p2 and p3 and the molar m3 are completely absent, as are the metaconids and entoconids cusps on the teeth on m1 and m2 as well as the paraconid on m2. Instead it has an enormous canine, which dominates the mandibular body, leaving no space for p1-3 to develop. It also developed shear facets on both m1 and m2, yet another adaptation to hypercarnivory.

The geologically younger specimens from Eppelsheim possess a cristid on the lingual paraconid, which is not found in the geologically older specimens.

The ulna is robust and slightly curved, resembling that of Amphicyon and bears, but with a much more robust, short but broad olecranon that curves laterally to enlarge the attachment area for Musculus triceps brachii, not unlike in Panthera. The forearm is also proportionally longer than in Amphicyon.

== Phylogeny and evolution ==
Agnotherium belongs to the 'cat-like' subfamily Thaumastocyoninae, which is defined by the complete suppression of m1 metaconid, reduction of the premolars, except the p4, which is reinforced, and the oblique abrasion of the teeth, and possesses hypercarnivorous tendencies. Within this subfamily, Agnotherium is closely related to the genera Tomocyon and Thaumastocyon, and it has been suggested, based on the morphology of m2 and p4, that it may be a descendant of the Middle Miocene Thaumastocyon bourgeoisi.

Agnotherium has been recovered as a derived Thaumastocyonine closely related to a Thaumastocyon + Ammitocyon clade by a phylogeny conducted in a later study, although the authors note that Agnotherium position is not well resolved due to the lack of upper jaw material attributable to it.

Below is the cladogram based on cranial, mandibular and dental characters, after Morales et al., 2021:

- Pseudocyonopsis landesquei
- - - Daphoenodon superbus
    - Cynelos lemanensis
    - "Ysengrinia" americana
    - Thaumastocyoninae
      - Crassidia intermedia
      - - Ysengrinia gerandia
        - - Peignecyon felinoides
          - - Tomocyon grivensis
            - - "Ysengrinia" valentiana
              - Agnotherium antiquum
              - - Ammitocyon kainos
                - - Thaumastocyon bourgeoisi
                  - Thaumastocyon dirus

== Paleobiology ==
Agnotherium took the trend of thaumastocyonines to become more hypercarnivorous to an extreme, with its dentition being the most trenchant of all amphicyonids, without the grinding or bone-crushing features many other bear dogs possess. The Eppelsheim material also showcases greater adaptations to hypercarnivory than the geologically older ones.

The short olecranon, and the robust triceps, indicate that Agnotherium had a much stronger forearm than Amphicyon, which was used to fix and demobilize large prey. This points towards Agnotherium being an ambush hunter similar to modern big cats, but more heavily built. Its long forearms also suggest that it was likely faster than Amphicyon. Since both Panthera species living in woodlands as well as bears are solitary, and are the best comparison as forest-inhabiting ambush hunters, it is likely that Agnotherium also lived a solitary lifestyle.

Despite only fragmentary remains being known, it is possible to reconstruct parts of Agnotherium's ontogeny thanks to the mandible of a subadult (about 2 or 3 years of age) found at Eppelsheim. It showcases that the incisors i1-2 are the first teeth to erupt, followed by m1 and afterwards p4, m2 and i3. The large canine is the last tooth to fully erupt. This tooth eruption pattern is more similar to Ursus than Canis among extant carnivorans, but the extinct ursid Agriotherium even more so, in which the molars erupted almost simultaneously once the animal reached its full size.

== Paleoecology ==
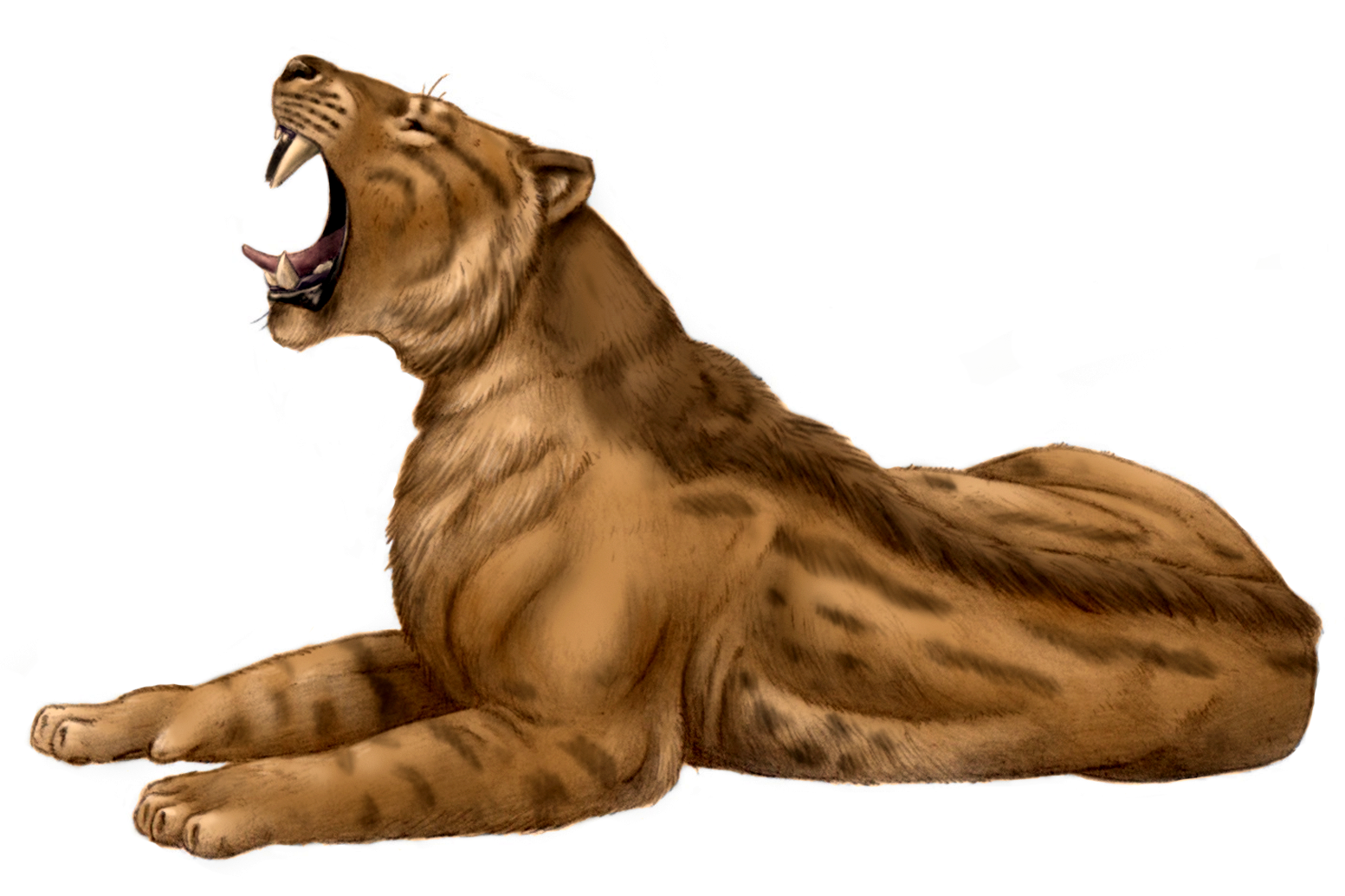
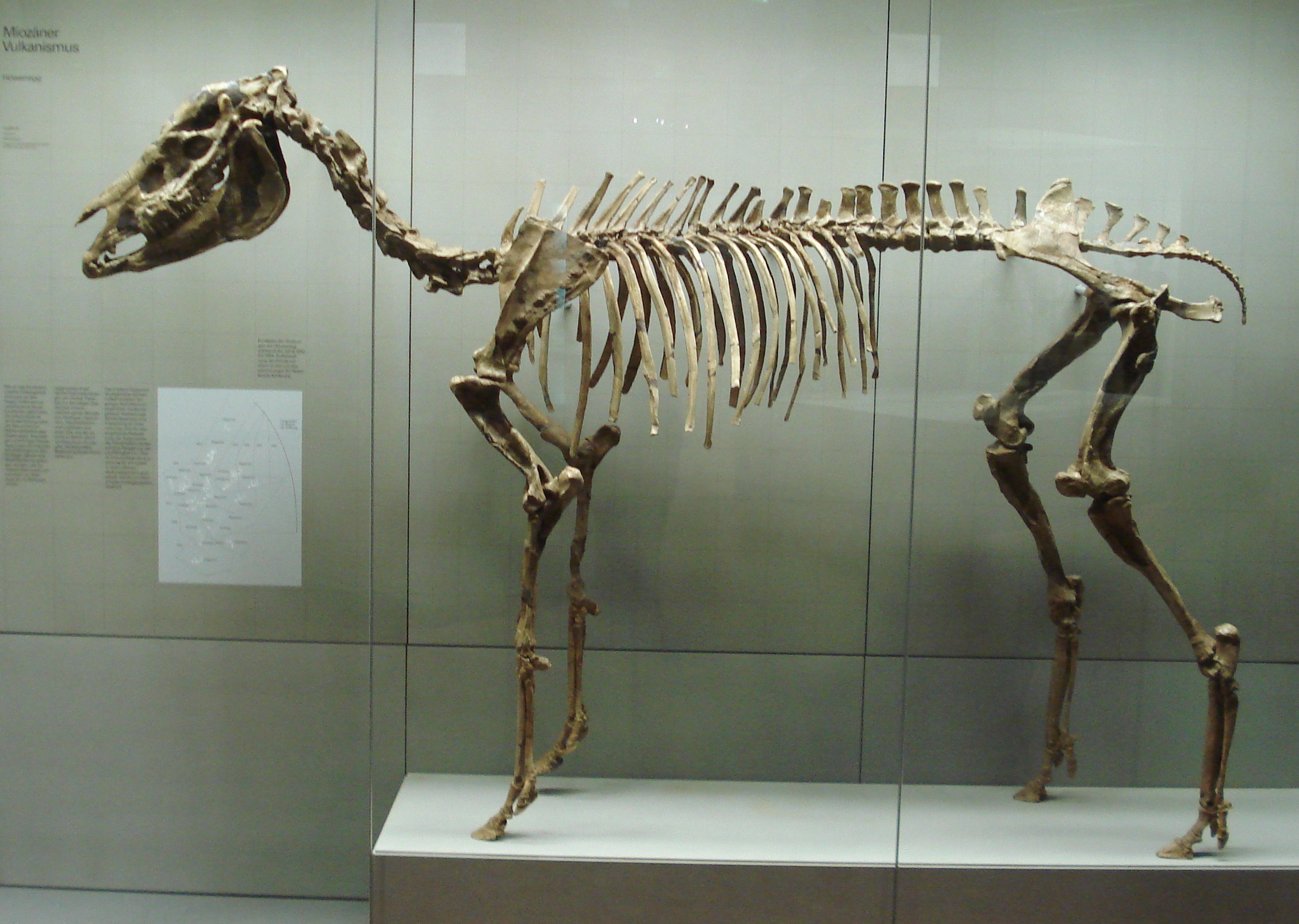
Several other large mammals coexisted with Agnotherium across Western Europe, including Machairodus and Hippotherium.

The site of Eppelsheim was located at the proto-Rhine, which flowed slowly and meandering through a wide valley, its banks covered by riparian forest. A woodland mosaic, with forests alongside relatively treeless steppes, covered the landscape. The temperatures were subtropical, and the slightly older locality of Sprendlingen has been estimated to have a mean annual temperature of 11–15 °C or 13.6–15.8 °C respectively. Here Agnotherium existed alongside two more large predators: the lionsized sabertooth cat Machairodus aphanistus and the even larger beardog Amphicyon eppelsheimensis. A. eppelheimensis was a taxon adapted to bonecrushing, but both Agnotherium and Machairodus represent hypercarnivorous species. The much more heavily built Agnotherium may have inhabited a different habitat, or hunted different prey, than the felid, as has been suggested for the Amphicyonid Magericyon and Machairodus from Batallones. Alternatively, the high biomass of the locality may have allowed them to coexist. Smaller carnivorans from the locality include the leopard-sized machairodontine Promegantereon and red panda relative Simocyon, and the civet like hyaena Ictitherium. Herbivores are represented by proboscideans such as Deinotherium and Tetralophodon, three species of rhinos (Aceratherium incisivum, Brachypotherium goldfussi and Dihoplus schleiermacheri), Chalicotherium, tapirs, the horse Hippotherium primigenium, several species of deer (belonging to the genera Amphiprox and Euprox), suids such as Propalaeochoerus and Microstonyx, the bovid Miotragocerus and the tragulid Dorcatherium. The enigmatic primate Paidopithex, with possible affinities to the Pliopithecidae, has been found here as well.

The slightly older locality of Charmoille also represents a subtropical woodland associated with the presence of water, and the fauna shares many taxa with Eppelsheim (such as Agnotherium, Machairodus, Hippotherium, Deinotherium, Dorcatherium and Euprox). Agnotherium also coexisted with Hippotherium and Euprox at Pedregueras 2A.

The presence of crocodiles such as Euthecodon at Bled Douarah showcases that what is now Sahara was once covered by extensive river systems, while fossilized wood possibly indicates a tropical woodland. Alongside Agnotherium/Myacyon, the fauna once again included Machairodus, as well as the hyaenas Percrocuta, Protictitherium and Lycyaena, the barbourofelid Vampyrictis, the primitive giraffe Palaeotragus, the anthracothere Libycosaurus and possibly the proboscidean Choerolophodon.
