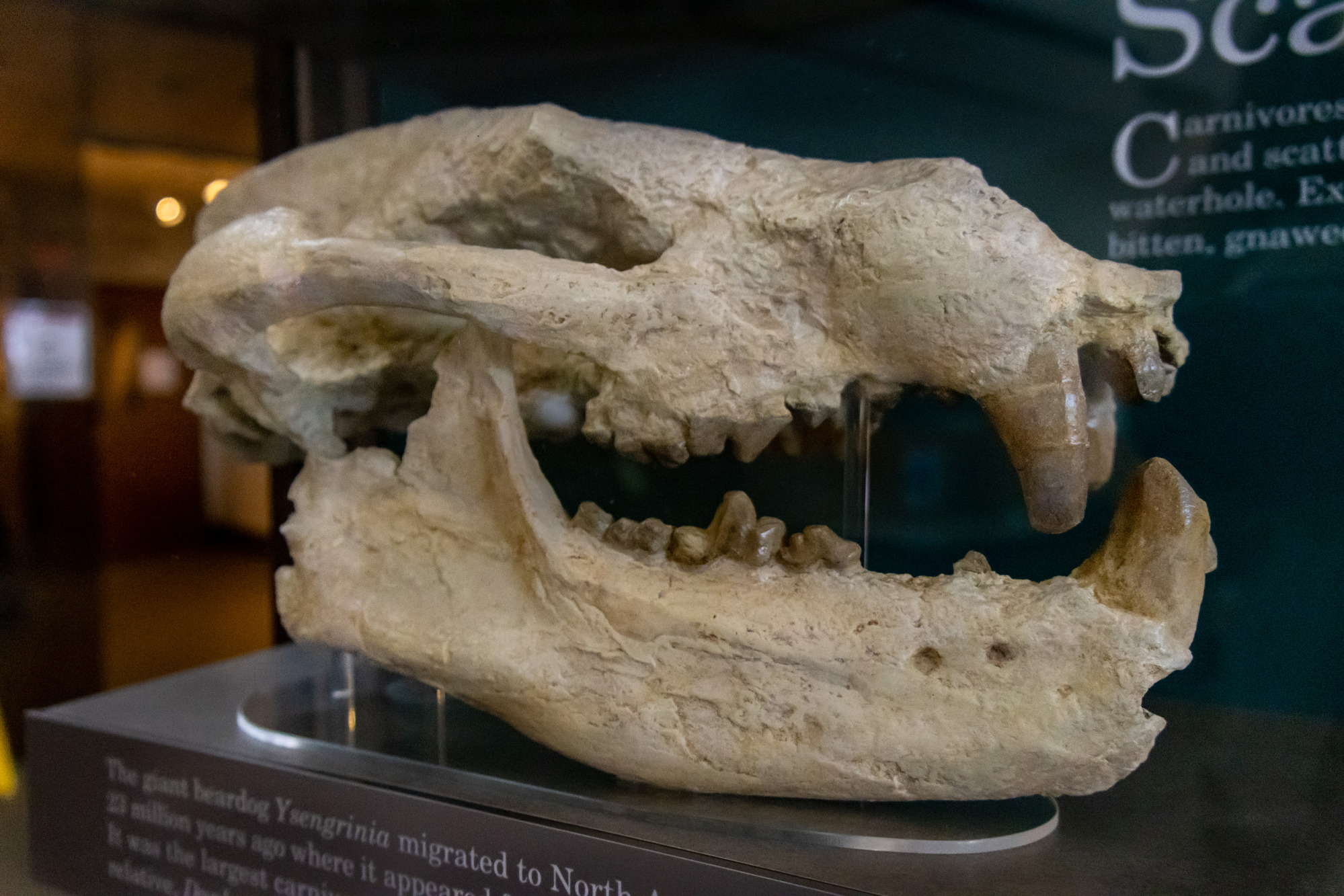
- Ysengrinia americana skull at Agate Fossil Beds National Monument

Scientific classification
- Kingdom: Animalia
- Phylum: Chordata
- Class: Mammalia
- Order: Carnivora
- Family: †Amphicyonidae
- Subfamily: †Thaumastocyoninae
- Genus: †Ysengrinia; Ginsburg (1965)

Type species
- Pseudocyon gerandianus Viret, 1929

Other species
- †Y. americana (Wortman, 1901); †Y. depereti (Mayet, 1908); †Y. tolosana (Noulet, 1876); †Y. valentiana Belinchon & Morales, 1989

= Ysengrinia =

Ysengrinia Temporal range: Late Oligocene to Early Miocene ~24–16 Ma

Extinct genus of mammals known as bear dogs

Ysengrinia is an extinct genus of carnivoran in the family Amphicyonidae, that lived during the Late Oligocene to Early Miocene. Fossil remains have been discovered in Western Europe, the United States and possibly China. The European species are among the earliest known members of the Thaumastocyoninae, a group of aberrant amphicyonids showcasing hypercarnivorous adations, but are only known from fragmentary remains. The American species is much better preserved and shows a robust, black-bear sized predator. These fossils play an important role in our understanding of the biotic interchange between Eurasia and North America during the earliest Miocene. However, more recent research suggests that the genus might be polyphyletic, and that several of its species should be excluded from Ysengrinia.

== History ==
While fossils of belonging to this amphicyonid had been known since the late nineteenth century, their affinities were not recognized until a century later. Originally the remains were assigned to the genera Pseudocyon and Amphicyon. Kuss was the first to recognize the first to realize the similarities between the three European species in 1963, and two years later he assigned them all to Arctamphicyon. However, Ginsburg disagreed with this assignment, and erected the genus Ysengrinia in 1965, with Y. gerandiana, previously referred to Pseudocyon, serving as its type species. The following year, he also moved the species Amphicyon tolosanus and Pseudocyon depereti to Ysengrinia, an arrangement generally followed by later authors, although Bonis (1973) suggested that Y. gerandiana might be synonymous with Y. tolosana.

In 1998, the species Ysengrinia ginsburgi was erected on the basis of fossils discovered at the locality Arrisdrift in Namibia, which would have made it the only species of the genus known from Africa. However, newer studies have recognized the distinct anatomical differences between this taxon and the type species Y. gerandiana, resulting in the creation of the separate genus Namibiocyon for the amphicyonid from Arrisdrift. Similarly, a tooth from the Askazansor Formation in Kazakhstan previously referred to Ysengrinia has since been moved to the genus Askazansoria.

== Phylogeny ==
Heizmann and Kordikova erected the tribe Ysengrini in 2000, in which they included not only Ysengrinia, but also Crassidia and Amphiyconopsis, and which they considered to be in an intermediary position between the Amphicyoninae and Thaumastocyoninae. More recent studies include the tribe within the latter subfamily, and furthermore suggest that Ysengrinia itself is polyphyletic. Cladistic analysis by Morales et al. recovers Ysengrinia americana outside the group that includes the rest of the genus, while Ysengrinia valentiana is more closely related to Thaumastocyon than to the type species Ysengrinia gerandia. The authors also point out that Y. americana has notable differences in the upper dentition compared to the rest of the genus, and displays a morphotype less adapted to hypercarnivory. Ysengrinia tolosana and Ysengrinia depereti, only known from their lower dentition, were not included in the analysis, and are in an uncertain systematic position. The authors suggest that Y. gerandia and Y. valentiana both belong to the Thaumastocyoninae, while Y. americana may either be the sister taxon of that subfamily, or be more closely related to Amphicyonines. It has been suggested that Peignecyon and an undescribed taxon from MN3/4 Baigneaux-en-Beauce descend from one of the numerous species of the genus.

Below is the cladogram based on cranial, mandibular and dental characters, after Morales et al., 2021:

- Pseudocyonopsis landesquei
- - - Daphoenodon superbus
    - Cynelos lemanensis
    - Ysengrinia americana
    - Thaumastocyoninae
      - Crassidia intermedia
      - - Ysengrinia gerandia
        - - Peignecyon felinoides
          - - Tomocyon grivensis
            - - Ysengrinia valentiana
              - Agnotherium antiquum
              - - Ammitocyon kainos
                - - Thaumastocyon bourgeoisi
                  - Thaumastocyon dirus

=== Species ===
Ysengrinia americana

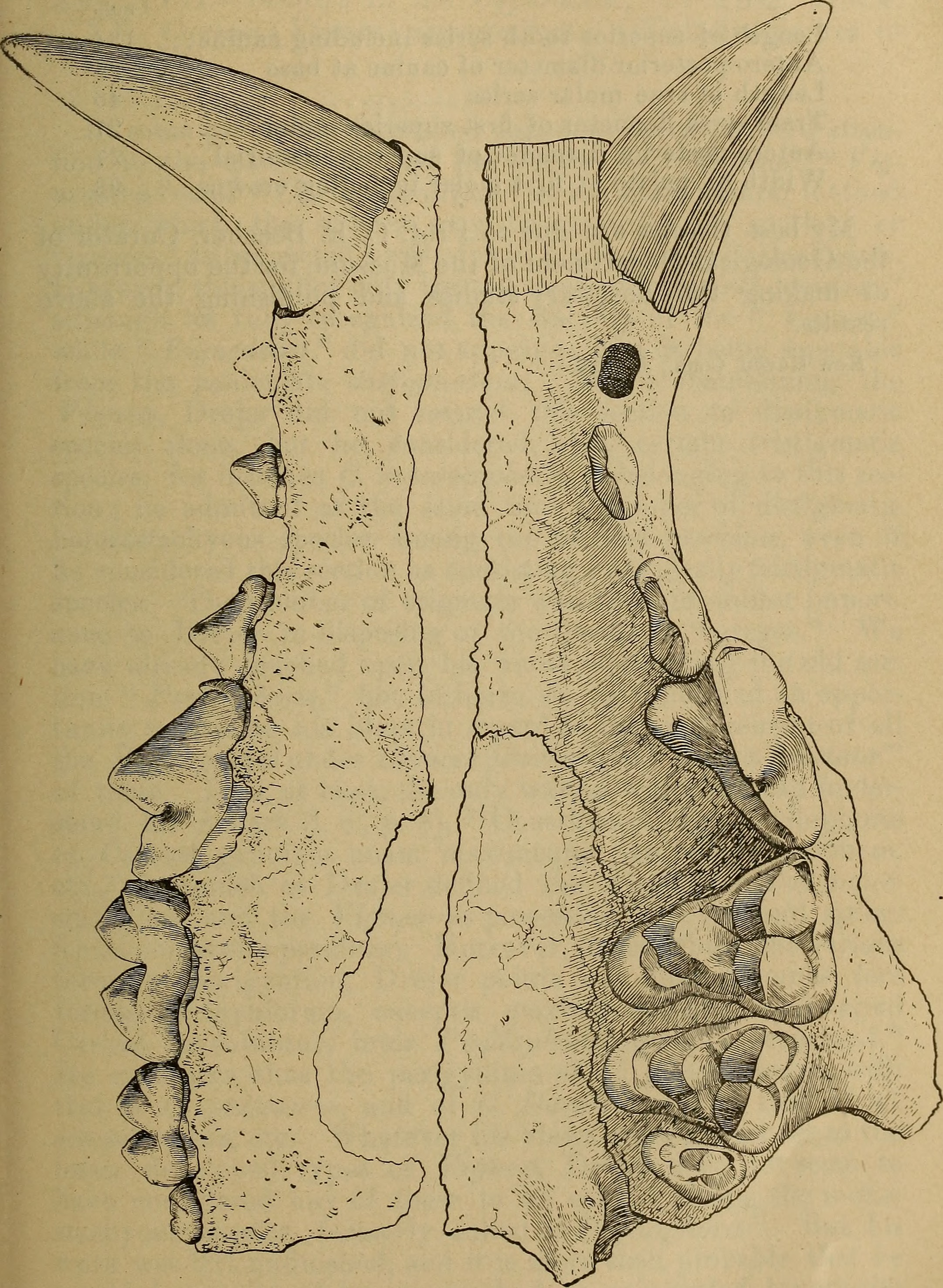
Illustration of the jaw of Ysengrinia americana

Y. americana is known from late Arikareean-aged rocks from Wyoming and Nebraska. The first fossils belonging to this species, a palate with nearly complete dentition, an upper canine and a calcaneum, were discovered by H.C. Clifford in 1875, and used as holotype for the description of "Amphicyon" americanus by Wortman in 1901. Some postcranial remains, several foot and limb bones, were discovered in the following years. It was not until 1972 that Hunt first proposed the presence of Ysengrinia in North America. Hunt then assigned "Amphicyon" americanus to the genus in 2002, resulting in the new combination Ysengrinia americana. He furthermore designated F:AM 54147, the only complete skull known of this genus, discovered in 1937 in the Anderson Ranch Formation, as its paratype. It is by far the most well-preserved member of the genus, and considerably larger than its European relatives. However, more recent work has cast doubt on the inclusion of this species in the genus, partly since its dentition is less hypercarnivorous than that of European Ysengrinia. The body mass of this species has been calculated at ~173 kg, but another estimation, derived from the diameter of the femur at the midshaft, results in a body mass of ~231 kg.

Ysengrinia depereti

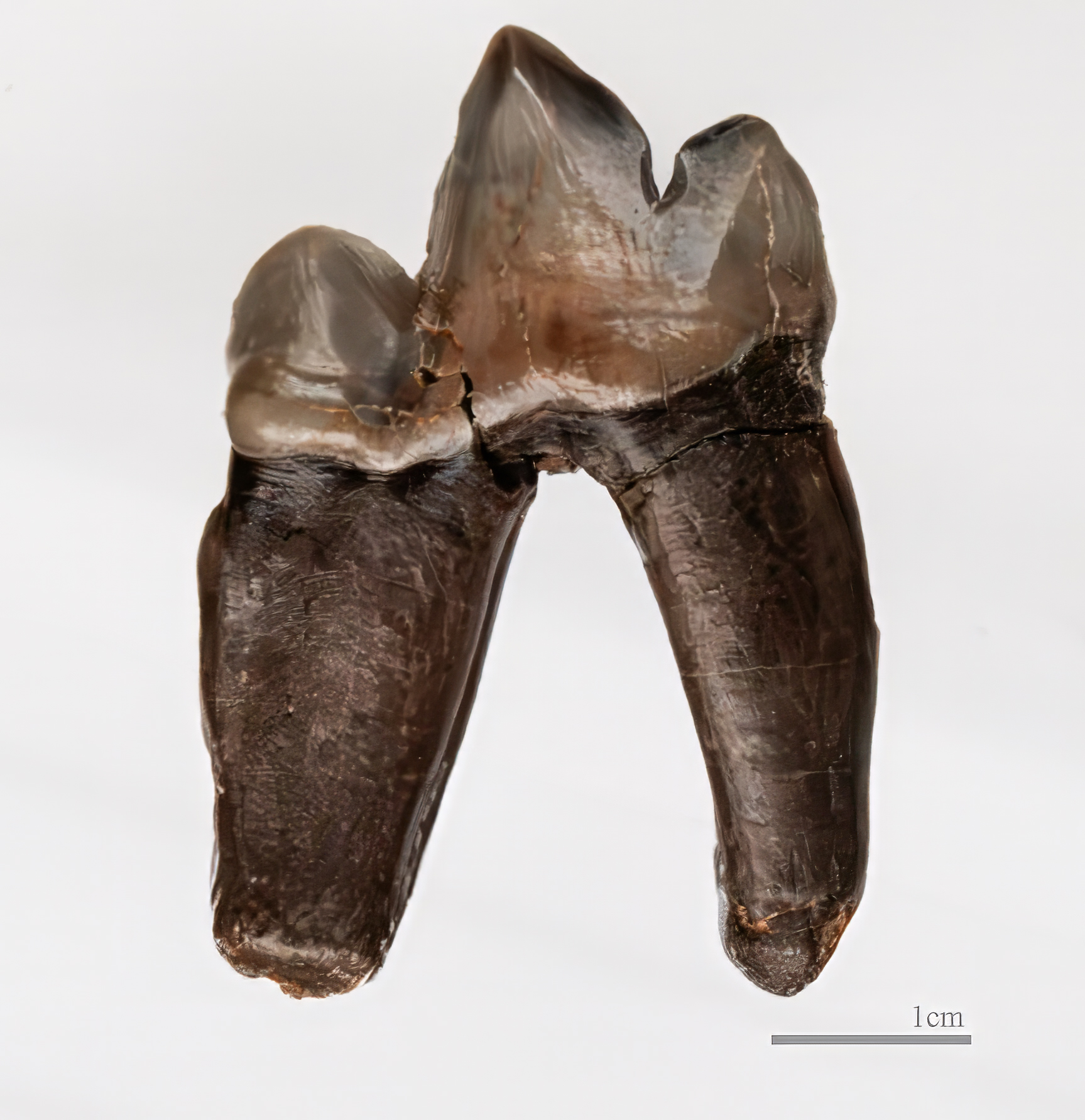
Ysengrinia depereti - Lower molar MHNT

A poorly known species, originally described as "Pseudocyon" depereti on the basis of a fragmentary left mandibular ramus. It is known from the French site of Chilleurs-aux-Bois, which dates to the early Burdigalian (MN 3). It had a broad m2 compared to Y. americana.

Ysengrinia gerandiana

Originally described by Viret as Pseudocyon gerandius on the basis of a mandibular fragment, before Ginsburg created it the type species of Ysengrinia. It is known from the French site Saint-Gérand-le-Puy, as well as the German Ulm-Westtangente, both dating to MN 2. It shows reduced crushing molars in comparison with Y. americana, though its hypercarnivorous features are less pronounced than in Peignecyon. Its body mass has been estimated at 89 kg.

Ysengrinia tolosana

Originally described as "Amphicyon" tolosanus by Noulet in 1876, this is the oldest known species of Ysengrinia, known from the terminal Oligocene to early Miocene of France and Germany. A fossil discovered at Flörsheim described as Amphicyon robustum by Weitzel in 1930 was shown by Kuss to belong to the same species. It is known by two mandibular fragments, one including p4-m2 from Le Cammas (probably dating to MP 30), and one from another with p3-m2 from Flörsheim (MP 30 or MN 2), as well as an isolated lower molar from Paulhiac (MN1), and the fragment of canine and a right humerus from Dieupentale (MP29-30). Hunt notes that Y. tolosana shares more characteristics with Y. americana than the other European species do. It is similar to Y. gerandiana in size, with an estimated mass of roughly 100 kg, but with a much wider second upper molar.

Ysengrinia valentiana

This species is only known from two isolated molars discovered at the Orleanian locality of Buñol (MN 4), making it the only species known from Spain. Recent studies have indicated that its referral to Ysengrinia is questionable, and that it may be a more derived Thaumastocyonine. It shows transitional features between Peignecyon and Thaumastocyon, though the fragmentary nature of its remains makes concluding the closer relationship of this taxon impossible. Its body mass has been estimated at 106 kg.

== Description ==
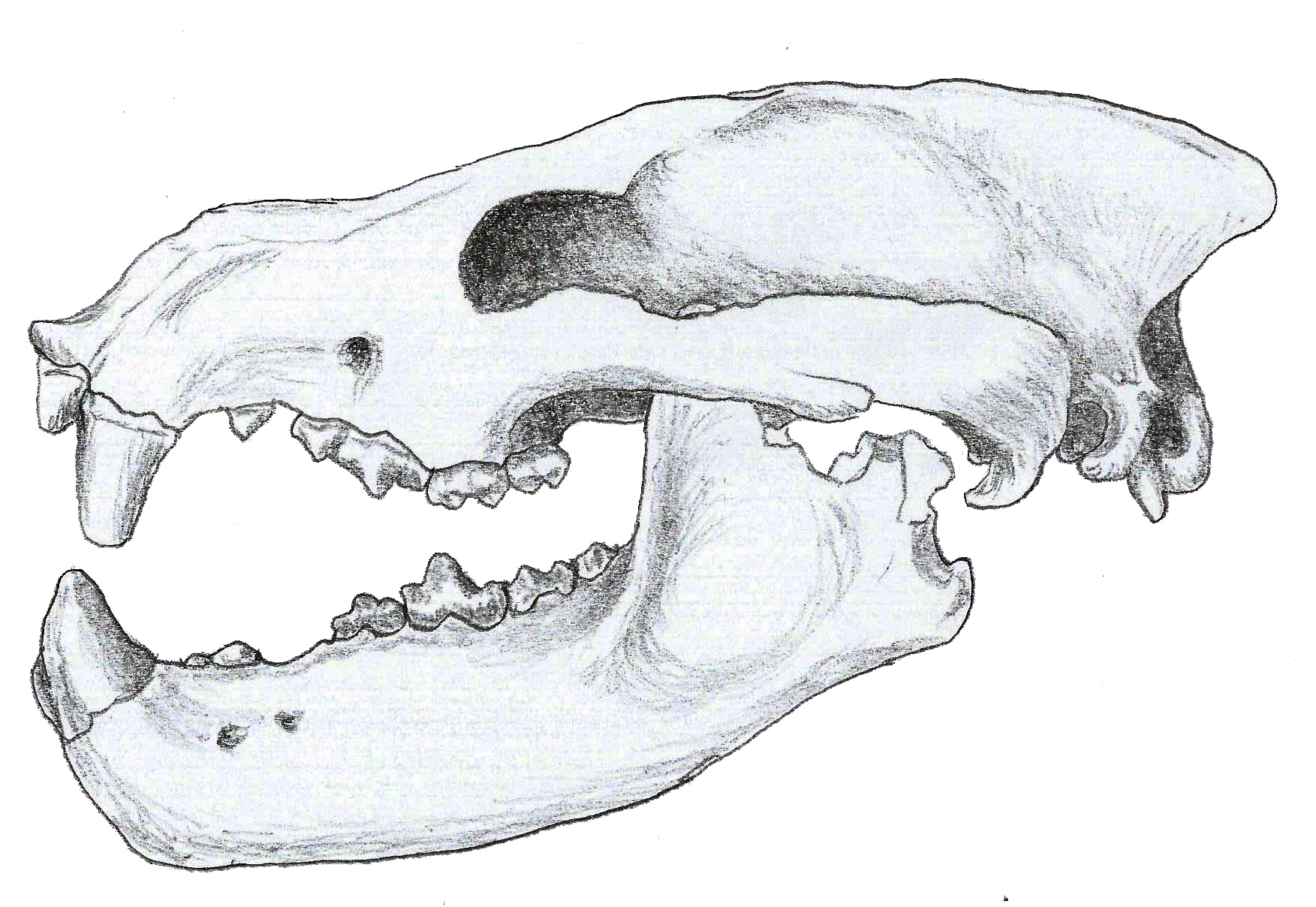
Skull of Ysengrinia americana

Ysengrinia included medium to large-sized amphicyonids, with Hunt estimating the various species to have weighed between roughly 40 and 150 kg, though another study estimates that Y. americana could have grown even larger than that.

Its anterior premolars were reduced in size, as in Cynelos and Amphicyon, but its posterior molars were not enlarged, as in the latter genus. In Y. gerandia the reduction of the second molars, typical in thaumastocyonines, can be detected. Y. tolosana shows wide diastemas between the premolars, and a characteristic second lower molar, with a wide trigonid and a high protoconid. The skull of Y. americana, the only species of which a complete skull is known, was large, with a basilar length of 30 cm (for comparison, the skull length of Y. gerandia has been estimated at ~24–25 cm). The snout was short and broadened at the level of the canines, which were remarkably large and robust, and are the reason for its deep and massive mandible. The braincase was remarkably small compared to the size of the skull, leading early authors to comment on its "primitive" characteristics. Its frontal region was only moderately inflated, with a flat, instead of domed, surface. Ysengrinia possessed a prominent sagittal crest, where massive temporal muscles could attach. The presence of a deep masseteric fossa bordered by thickened ventral and anterior margins indicates that a considerable force was developed during the occlusion of the carnassials and molars. The talonid of the first lower molar formed a crushing platform with the second and third molars. Like most other North American amphicyonids, it had a dental formula of 3-1-4-3.

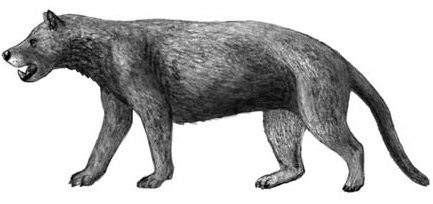
Restoration of Ysengrinia americana

The postcranial remains of Ysengrinia show that it was a robust animal, with short, but powerful, limbs, with its forelimb being everted at the elbow. The morphology of its extremities is similar to that of ursids, though the relative length of the forelimb is longer than in either bears or tigers and comparable to that of a lion, whereas the relative length of the hindlimb is in between that of bears and big cats. Its shoulder is enormous and stabilized by the massive and thick muscles of the rotator cuff. The immense scapula includes a very broad scapular spine, and terminates in a well-developed acromion and a less-developed metacromion. Both this feature and the size of the glenoid fossa are more similar to polar bears than lions or tigers. The humerus is also similar to that of Ursus, as well as Amphicyon, but it lacked the deep olecranon fossa, and the associated secure locking of the ulna in the fossa, which prevents lateral bending of the elbow joint, making the condition seen in Ysengrinia more primitive in comparison. The iliopsoas muscle seems to have been huge, and the femur and tibia were similar to those of lions and tigers, although more robust in large males. The features of the astragalus are unlike those of plantigrade carnivorans such as ursids, and more similar to those of digitigrade felids, but it likely wasn't fully digitigrade like modern dogs and cats. It probably moved in a "subdigitigrade" stance, though while standing, the entire sole of the hindfoot likely touched the ground. Overall, these characteristics indicate that Ysengrinia lacked any cursorial adaptations and was an ambush hunter similar to big cats, relying on short bursts of speed to catch its prey, which was then disposed of with help of its powerful forelimbs and large canines. There is evidence of sexual dimorphism in Y. americana, as the females seem to have been smaller and more gracile than the males.

== Paleobiogeography and Paleoecology ==
The earliest amphicyonids were small-sized, but towards the end of the Chattian larger taxa, among them the comparatively enormous Ysengrinia, appeared for the first time. The geologically oldest fossils of the genus date to the late Oligocene, and are found at sites such as Dieupentale and Thézels, the former dating to MP 29, and the latter to MP 30, immediately prior to the Oligocene-Miocene transition, and it has even been reported from the even earlier Pech Desse (MP 28, ~25 Ma). Their emergence is linked to the turnover of Europe's carnivores around MP 26 (~26.5 Ma), that saw the diversification of amphicyonids, and the emergence of the first large members of the family; as well as the Microbunodon event, which took place during MP 28 (24.8-24 Ma), and saw a huge faunal turnover of 40% of the European ungulate fauna within 500k years, correlating with a major arrival of Asian immigrants. It is associated with the climate becoming more arid and seasonal, and the spread of wooded savannas. The amphicyonids seem to have been strongly affected by these changes, and not only Ysengrinia, of likely European origin, but also Goupilictis, one of the smallest amphicyonids, and probably an Asian immigrant, are recorded for the first time during this period. Ysengrinia coexisted with this smaller taxon, the medium-sized amphicyonids Cynelos and Brachycyon, as well as Hyaenodon, which seems to have been less affected by the environmental changes than the carnivorans. It is unclear if the amphicyonids, more adapted to wooded environments, were sympatric with the rather cursorial Hyaenodon, or if the two groups were environmentally separated. However, despite their apparent adaptations towards more open environments, the late Oligocene ultimately saw the local extinction of hyaenodonts, and the continuing diversification of amphicyonids, indicating that the latter benefitted from the environmental and faunal changes.

The early Miocene amphicyonid guild of Europe was overall similar to that of the latest Oligocene, made up of numerous medium-sized amphicyonines and haplocyonines, and large thaumastocyonines such as Ysengrinia and Crassidia, though it is differentiated by the first appearance of the possibly bone-crushing mesocarnivore Amphicyon.

In North America, the temnocyonine amphicyonids were the only large-sized carnivorans present during the Oligocene-Miocene boundary, after the local extinction of both nimravids and hyaenodonts. However, in the earliest Miocene, tectonic activities in Asia led to a dispersal event of Eurasian species into North America that lasted from circa 23 to 15.5 Ma, from the late Arikareean to the Hemingfordian. Ysengrinia americana, which was considerably larger than even the largest temnocyonines, was among the earliest of these immigrants, first appearing around 23 Ma, alongside another amphicyonid, Cynelos, the chalicothere Moropus, the rhinoceros Menoceras and the ursid Cephalogale. Another amphicyonid, Daphoenodon, first occurred at the same time, though this genus likely descended from earlier amphicyonids endemic to the New World, and is therefore not associated with the biotic interchange. During this time period, the climate dried, and savannahs spread over the Great Plains, with trees mostly being restricted to riverbanks. Ephermal lakes were often the only source of water available, and mass deaths resulted when they dried out during the common droughts. It is in these waterhole deposits that Ysengrinia was discovered. A notable locality is Beardog Hill, named for the unusually high number of amphicyonid fossils found here. Most of these belong to either Daphoenodon superbus, or the rarer Delotrochanter oryktes, a temnocyonine showcasing adaptions towards both durophagy and cursoriality, both of which were found in the remnants of their dens. Other carnivorans of the site include two small canids (Phlaocyon annectens and Cormocyon), a small mustelid (Promartes olcotti) and the large, wolverine-like Megalictis simplicidens. Various prey animals dragged to the dens, including oreodont Merychyus and the camels Stenomylus and Oxydactylus, were also discovered. Ysengrinia, however, is absent from the dens, likely as a result of its large size, and only found at the waterhole, where Moropus, Menoceras and the huge, omnivorous Daeodon are the most common taxa. Y. americana was generally associated with waterholes and riparian habitats across its range. In the somewhat younger localities of the Anderson Ranch Formation (formerly known as Upper Harrison Formation), which date to the latest Arikareean, Ysengrinia occurs alongside the youngest known temnocyonines, Temnocyon macrogenys and Delotrochanter major, the Daphoenines Daphoenodon falkenbachi and Adilophontes brachykolos, as well as the immense Megalictis ferox. The following Arikareean-Hemingfordian boundary is characterized by a faunal turnover, characterized by the disappearance of all afromentioned carnivorans, including Y. americana and temnocyonines, as well as the appearance of several more Eurasian immigrants, among them the earliest North American members of the genus Amphicyon, which first occurred around 18.8 Ma. However, at least some of these sudden extinctions and appearances may be the result of the changing depositional environments, as the Anderson Ranch Formation was accumulated in a semi-arid grassland, whereas the Runningwater Formation was formed by fluvial environments. While Ysengrinia has also been reported from New Mexico, Hunt's review of the American fossils of the genus does not include these fossils.

An upper molar discovered in the Japanese Orematsu Formation, which dates to 16.3-15.6 Ma, has also previously been referred to this genus. Other authors have pointed out that this fossil is notably younger than the youngest known Ysengrinia fossils, and is morphologically similar to that of Cynelos idoneus, a taxon that is furthermore of similar age to the fossil from Japan. A partially preserved maxilla and isolated teeth of Ysengrinia, resembling Y. americana, have also been reported from the Xiejahe Fauna of China, which is part of the Shanwang Formation, and dates to circa 18 Ma.
