= Peignecyon =

Peignecyon Temporal range: Early Miocene

Scientific classification
- Kingdom: Animalia
- Phylum: Chordata
- Class: Mammalia
- Order: Carnivora
- Family: †Amphicyonidae
- Subfamily: †Thaumastocyoninae
- Genus: †Peignecyon; Morales et al. 2019

Type species
- †Peignecyon felinoides Morales et al. 2019

Extinct genus of mammals known as bear dogs

Peignecyon is an extinct genus of large carnivorans belonging to the family Amphicyonidae (known colloquially as "bear-dogs"). It belongs to the subfamily Thaumastocyoninae, which is characterized by their adaptions towards hypercarnivory. Whereas most other thaumastocyonines are often only known from fragmentary remains and isolated teeth, Peignecyon is known from a variety of well-preserved remains. It contains a single species, P. felinoides from the Early Miocene of the Czech Republic.

== History ==
Remains later referred to this taxon were first mentioned in a 2003 review of the mammals of Tuchořice by Fejfar et al., who considered it to be a new species of Tomocyon. A summary of the Carnivorans of the locality by the same lead author in 2016 suggested that these fossils may represent a new genus. It was finally described in 2019, with a right mandible (NM-Pv 11600), with several preserved teeth, serving as the holotype. Several more mandibles, as well as isolated teeth, are also known. At the time of the publication, it was the most completely known thaumastocyonine, though more complete remains have since been recovered.

The genus name honors Stéphane Peigné, while the species name references the cat-like features typical of the subfamily.

== Phylogeny ==
Peignecyon is an intermediate genus of thaumastocyonines, showing several features more derived than those of earlier taxa such as Ysengrinia and Crassidia, though less developed than in the youngest known members of the subfamily, such as Ammitocyon. It has been suggested that it derives from one of the numerous species of Ysengrinia.

Below is the cladogram based on cranial, mandibular and dental characters, after Morales et al., 2021:

- Pseudocyonopsis landesquei
- - - Daphoenodon superbus
    - Cynelos lemanensis
    - Ysengrinia americana
    - Thaumastocyoninae
      - Crassidia intermedia
      - - Ysengrinia gerandia
        - - Peignecyon felinoides
          - - Tomocyon grivensis
            - - Ysengrinia valentiana
              - Agnotherium antiquum
              - - Ammitocyon kainos
                - - Thaumastocyon bourgeoisi
                  - Thaumastocyon dirus

== Description ==
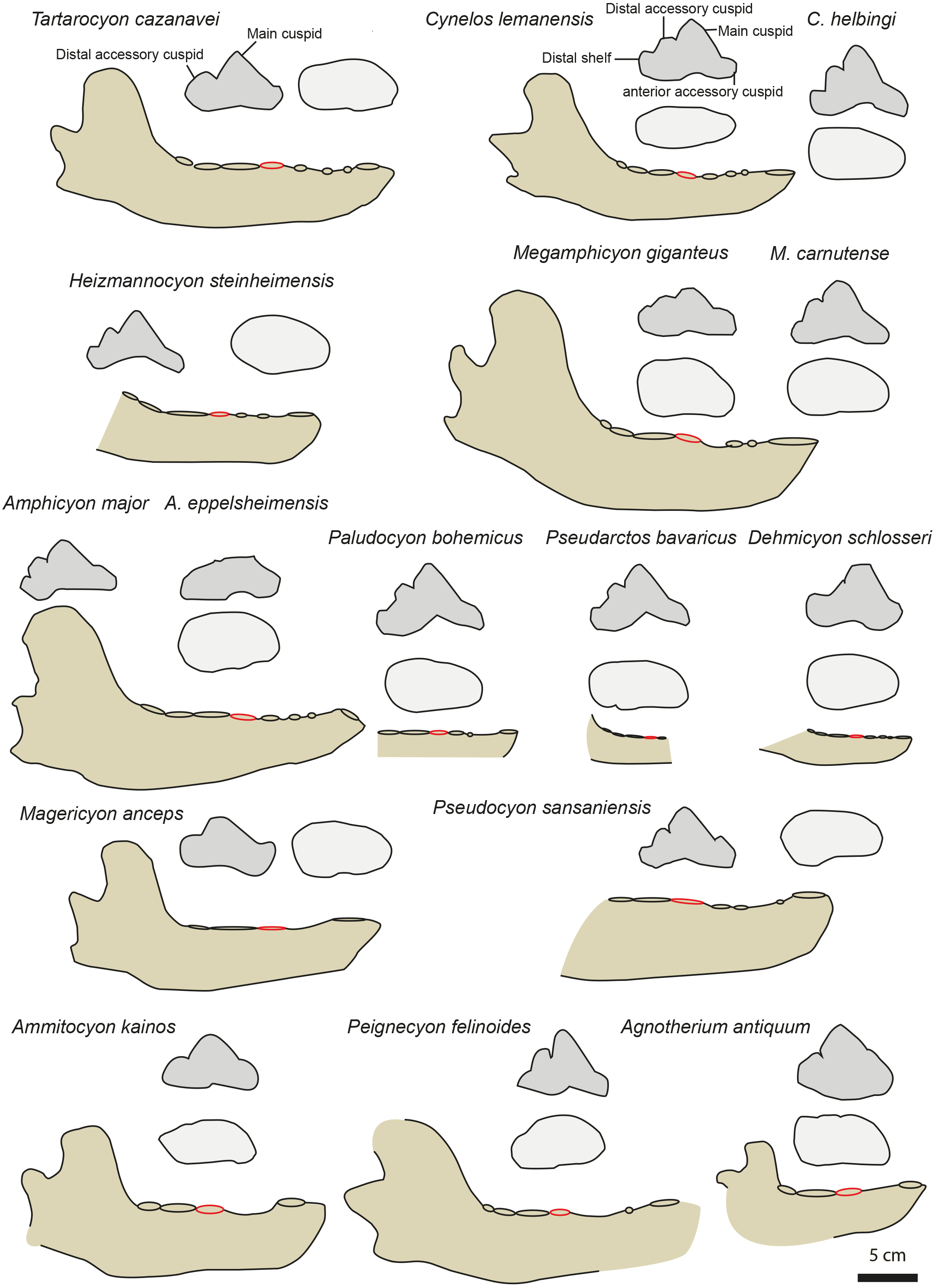
Comparison of the mandibles and fourth premolars of various amphicyonids, including Peignecyon

The mandible of this taxon is quite similar to that of a wolf, but shorter and more robust. Albeit its morphology still resembles that of the Amphicyoninae, Peignecyon shows clear adaptions towards hypercarnivory, which are more developed than in earlier thaumastocyonines such as Ysengrinia. The most notable of these is the long diastema, which is associated with the reduction of the second and third lower premolars. The fourth premolar has a distally inclined, high protoconid, but it is small compared to the first molar. The short talonid of the latter is dominated by the hypoconid, and is of similar width to the trigonid. The mesial cristids of the protoconid, paraconid, and the strongly developed hypoconid are aligned to form the carnassial blade. The metaconid is strongly diminished. All these features show that it possessed moderately sectorial carnassials. Both the lower and upper second molar are reduced in size, with the lower one having a quadrangular shape. The m3 is even smaller than the m2. The lingual area of the M1 is also strongly reduced, a feature typical of more derived members of the subfamily. Its canine is well-developed, with a sharp distal cristid. The shortening of the rostrum and the reduction of the premolars in thaumastocyonines is reminiscent of felids.

The body mass of this species has been estimated at 110 kg.

== Paleoecology ==
Peignecyon has so far only been discovered at Tuchořice, an early Miocene locality which dates to MN3. The site preserves a riparian forest dominated by maples. Date palms and lianas also occur, indicating a warm climate, in which temperatures did not fall under 18°C. Hot minerals springs shaped the site, at which an abundant amount of fossils belonging to various carnivorans were found. This can likely be explained by the 'trapping effect': Predators were attracted to the carcasses of herbivores killed by the gases released by the mineral springs, only to succumb to the carbon dioxide themselves. Besides Peignecyon, three more amphicyonids were discovered: the large amphicyonines Paludocyon bohemicus and Amphicyon carnutense, and the small Dehmicyon schlosseri. Other carnivorans include the small ursids Ballusia and Ursavus, as well as the larger Hemicyon, the viverrid Semigenetta and a variety of mustelids and procyonids. Among the larger mammals are three species of rhinoceros, belonging to the genera Prosantorhinus, Protaceratherium and Aceratherium. Other herbivores include chalicotheres, the suid Aureliachoerus, the anthracothere Brachyodus, and the ruminants Palaeomeryx, Lagomeryx, and Amphitragulus. The small-mammal assemblage is dominated by sciurids, but various eomyids, glirids, shrews, and beavers are also present. Non-mammalian fossils include abundant turtle remains, and various accipitrids, the latter of which likely met their demise due to the same 'trapping effect' as their mammalian counterparts.
