= Prothomomys =

Prothomomys Temporal range: Neogene

Scientific classification
- Kingdom: Animalia
- Phylum: Chordata
- Class: Mammalia
- Infraclass: Placentalia
- Order: Rodentia
- Family: Geomyidae
- Genus: †Prothomomys; May et al., 2011
- Species: †P. warrenensis

Binomial name
- †Prothomomys warrenensis May et al., 2011

Extinct genus of rodents

Prothomomys is an extinct genus of geomyid that lived during the Neogene period.

== Distribution ==
Prothomomys warrenensis fossils are known from the Horned Toad Formation of California, dating back to the Hemphilian North American land mammal age.
