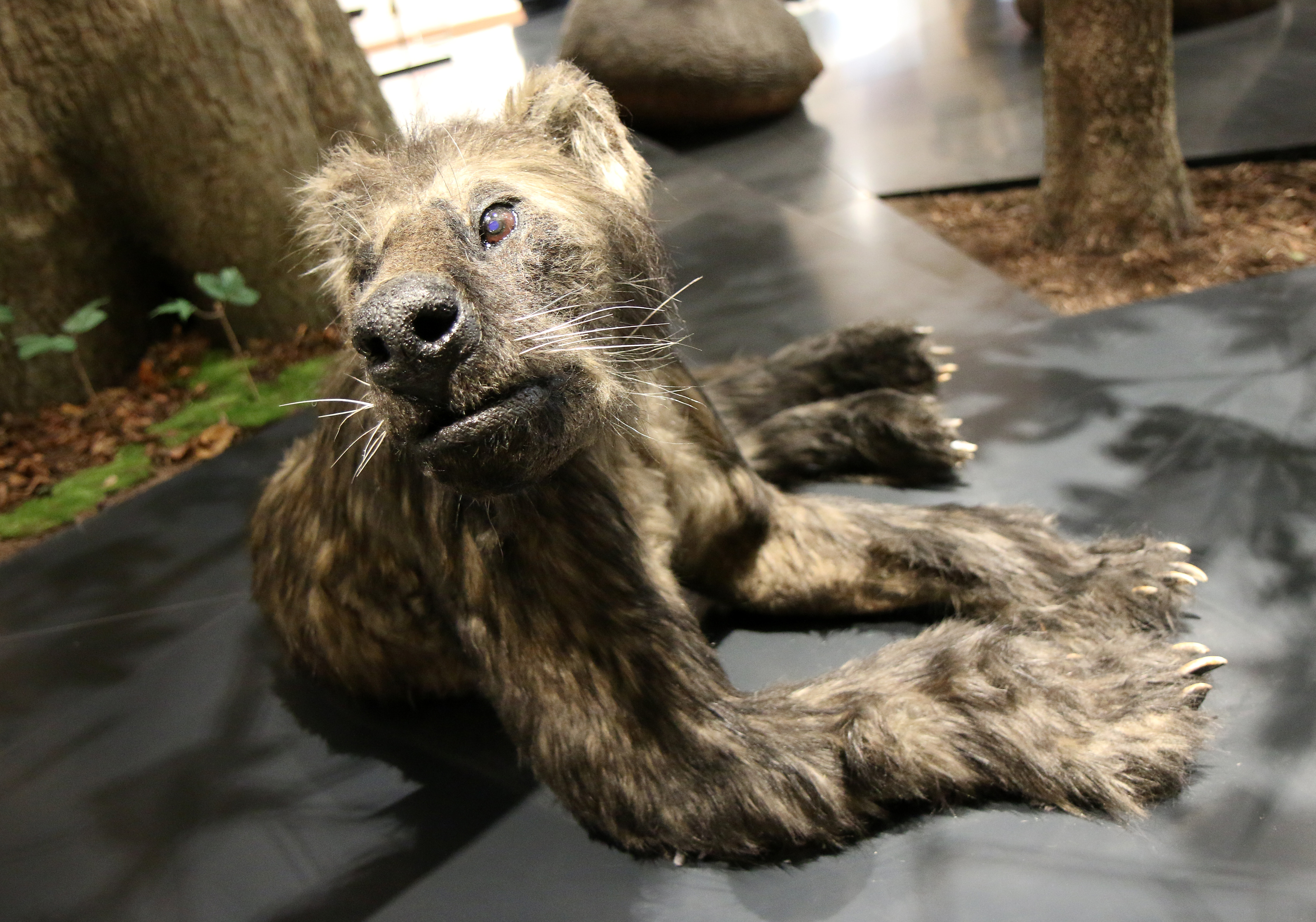
- Reconstruction of Agnotherium antiquum, Naturhistorisches Museum Mainz

Scientific classification
- Kingdom: Animalia
- Phylum: Chordata
- Class: Mammalia
- Order: Carnivora
- Family: †Amphicyonidae
- Subfamily: †Thaumastocyoninae; Hürzeler, 1940

Type genus
- †Thaumastocyon Stehlin & Helbing, 1925

Genera
- †Agnotherium; †Ammitocyon; †Crassidia; †Amphicyonopsis?; †Peignecyon; †Thaumastocyon; †Tomocyon; †Ysengrinia

= Thaumastocyoninae =

Thaumastocyoninae Temporal range: Miocene Early to Late Miocene, 23-9.1 Ma

Extinct subfamily of amphicyonids

Thaumastocyoninae is an extinct subfamily of amphicyonids, large terrestrial carnivores, which inhabited what is now Europe during the Miocene epoch. The subfamily was erected by Hürzeler (1940), and is defined by the complete suppression of m1 metaconid, reduction of the premolars, except the p4, which is reinforced, and the oblique abrasion of the teeth, and the possession of hypercarnivorous tendencies. Thaumastocyonines are poorly known, with only about 65 dental specimens, most of those isolated teeth, being known as of 2020, although more complete remains have recently been discovered.

== Evolution and phylogeny ==
The first thaumastocyonines appear during the earliest Miocene epoch in the form of Crassidia intermedia, which was already the largest predator in its habitat. However, they diversified following the major faunal and climatic changes of the Orleanian. The replacement of Western Europe's arid landscape with wet environments, combined with the dispersal of African and Asian taxa into Europe, lead to a reconstruction of the local faunal community. As a result, the Haplocyoninae disappeared from Europe, while their close relatives, the thaumastocyonines and amphicyonines, flourished. The Thaumastocyoninae reached their peak diversity during MN9 stage of the Vallesian, but they disappeared soon after. One possible explanation are the effects of the Vallesian Crisis, a major local extinction event as a result of the reduction of forests in favor of open habitats, which reshaped Europe's fauna. Among thaumastocyonines, only Ammitocyon is known after this event.

Below is a cladogram based on cranial, mandibular and dental characters, after Morales et al., 2021, showing the phylogenetic relationships between the species of the subfamily:

- - Pseudocyonopsis landesquei
  - - Daphoenodon superbus
    - Cynelos lemanensis
    - - "Ysengrinia" americana
      - - Thaumastocyoninae
          - Crassidia intermedia
          - - Ysengrinia gerandia
            - - Peignecyon felinoides
              - - Tomocyon grivensis
                - - "Ysengrinia" valentiana
                  - Agnotherium antiquum
                  - - Ammitocyon kainos
                    - - Thaumastocyon bourgeoisi
                      - Thaumastocyon dirus

== Classification ==
Name	Species	Age	Notes
Agnotherium	A. antiquum	MN9/10	
Ammitocyon	A. kainos	MN10	Most completely known thaumastocyonine.
Crassidia	C. intermedia	MN1-MN2	
Amphicyonopsis	A. serus	MN6?-MN7/8	The genus is of dubious validity, and referral to this subfamily is questionable.
Peignecyon	P. felinoides	MN3	
Thaumastocyon	T. bourgeoisi T. dirus	MN5-MN9	
Tomocyon	T. grivense	MN3-MN9	
Ysengrinia	Y. gerandiana Y. depereti Y. tolosana Y. valentiana	MN1-MN4	The genus is polyphyletic. Y. valentiana is more closely related to Thaumastocyon than to the type species Y. gerandiana. Y. depereti and Y. tolosana are only known from fragmentary remains, and have therefore not been included in the phylogenies, making their status unclear. Y. americana should both be excluded from the genus, and the subfamily Thaumastocyoninae.
