= Ammitocyon =

Ammitocyon Temporal range: Tortonian Late Miocene, 9.1 Ma

Scientific classification
- Kingdom: Animalia
- Phylum: Chordata
- Class: Mammalia
- Order: Carnivora
- Family: †Amphicyonidae
- Subfamily: †Thaumastocyoninae
- Genus: †Ammitocyon; Morales et al., 2021

Type species
- †Ammitocyon kainos Morales et al., 2021

Extinct genus of mammals

Ammitocyon is a genus of large sized carnivoran mammals, belonging to the Amphicyonidae ("bear dogs"), that lived during the Late Miocene in what is now Spain. It is notable for its extreme adaptations towards hypercarnivory, its extremely robust skeleton, and was one of the last surviving members of its family.

== History and naming ==
Ammitocyon was described in the year 2021 by Morales et al. based on comparatively complete remains, originally referred to Thaumastocyon, enabling a greater understanding of the subfamily Thaumastocyoninae, hitherto only known from fragmentary material. Holotype is the pair of hemimandibles BAT-3'09.1239 and BAT-3'08.604, which belong to the same individual. BAT-3'10.1689 (a skull with strong signs of corrosion, especially in the dorsal region, belonging to a senile individual) and BAT-3'11.453 (a complete mandible belonging to the same individual), as well as the isolated left m2 BAT-3'09.1124, have been designated as paratypes. Furthermore, postcranial remains are known and await a closer description.

The name Ammitocyon is a combination of "Ammit", an ancient Egyptian goddess, chosen as her mix of crocodile, hippopotamus, and lion features reminded the authors of the fossil species, and the Ancient Greek κύων (kúōn, "dog"). The species καινός (kainós) name also derives from Ancient Greek, and translates to "of a new kind".

== Geographical and temporal distribution ==
The type and so far only locality of the genus is Batallones-3, part of the Cerro de los Batallones site complex located in Madrid, Spain. BAT-3 is the most recent deposit of the series, dating to the late Vallesian, MN10, dating to circa 9.1 Ma.

The Batallones are a complex of cavities, which held water even in harsh droughts, trapping herbivores that came down to drink. Their carcasses then attracted a large variety of carnivores, which then got stuck themselves. As a result, over 90% of mammalian fossils in BAT-3 are remains of carnivorans.

== Description ==
Ammitocyon was a lion-sized taxon, with its weight estimated at 231 kg. It is characterized by its extremely robust build, with powerful legs, almost unmatched among caniforms, and adaptations to hypercarnivory. Its chin and muzzle are sturdy, and its snout is huge, with a wide nasal aperture. The dentition is sectorial. The reduction of its premolars, typical for thamastocyonines, is taken to an extreme - it has completely lost P2/P3 and p1-3, as well as its third molars (M3 and m3).

It possesses a premaxilla more robust than that found in Magericyon. Both the frontal and jugal possess well-developed postorbital processes, resulting in a relatively large eye socket, which is more enclosed than that of similarly sized arctoid carnivorans. The Bulla is large and somewhat inflated and the sagittal crest well-developed and convex, stretching from the post-orbital constriction to the nuchal crests.

Like in Ysengrinia americana and some temnocynines the palate is cadually expanded beyond the molars. The mandible is long and robust, with strong symphysis, it is dorsoventrally slender between the canine and p4, and buccolingually thick under m1 and m2. In typical amphicyonids, including thaumastocyonines, the depth of masseteric fossa surpasses basal level of postcanine row, while in Ammitocyon it does not exceed the depth of margo alveolaris. A relatively deep rim encloses it completely in its ventral region, separating the fossa from the unique flat region in a premasseteric position. Another unique feature is the broad concavity in the ventral margin, extending from the genial tuberosity to the mesial base of the ascending ramus.

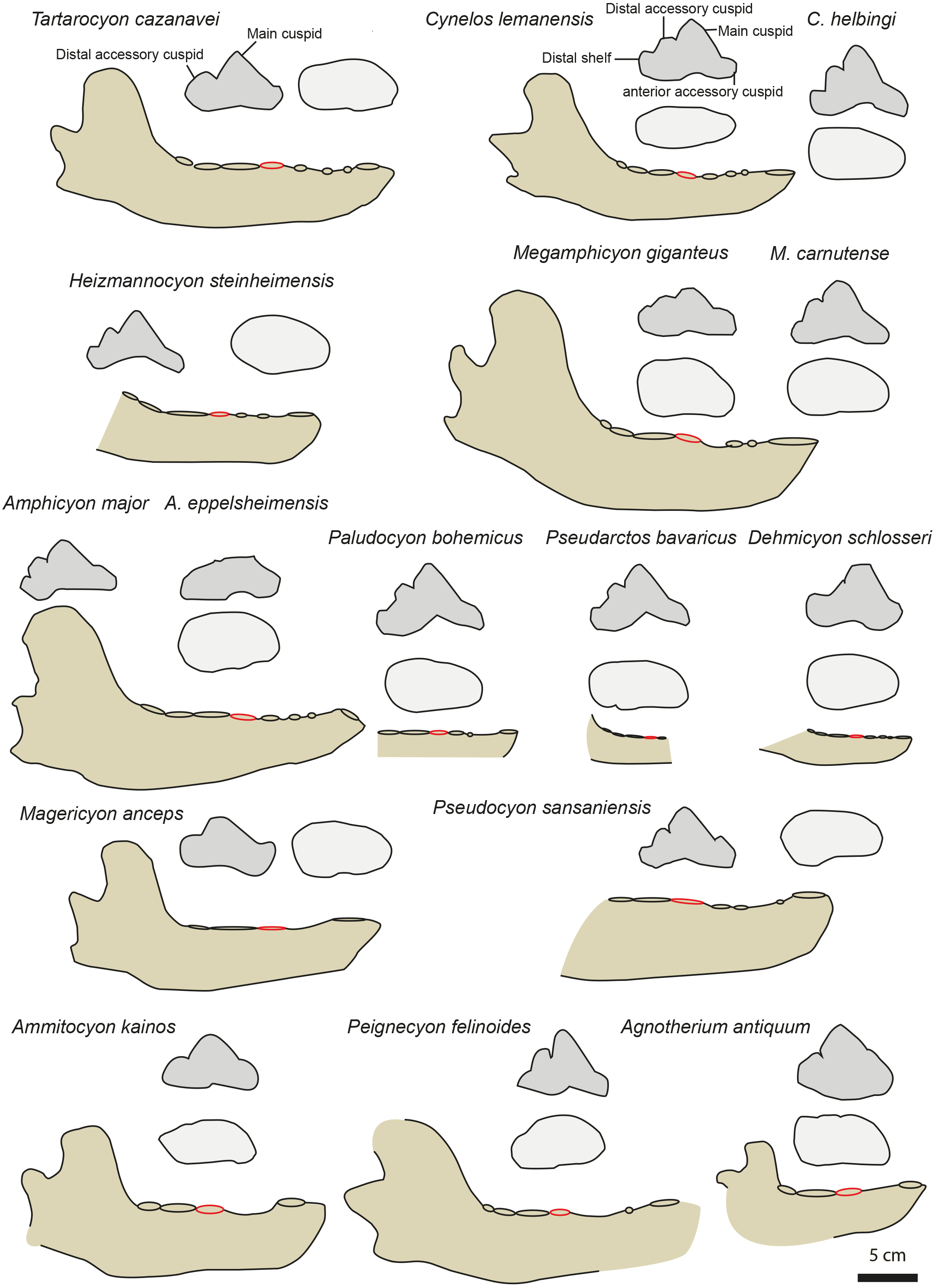
Comparison of the mandibles and fourth premolars of Ammitocyon and various other European amphycionids.

The dental formula of A. kainos is $\frac{3.1.2.2.}{3.1.1.2.}$.

The upper canine is robust and shows buccolingual compression, while its large and curved lower canines are buccolingually elongated and have broad roots, relative to the height of their crown. The P4 is elongated, possessing a large parastyle and a well-developed lingual root for the protocone. The M1 and M2 meanwhile are reduced, showing a triangular outline in combination with P4, and the incisor battery is extremely wide, each one being well separated from the other, similar to that of barbourofelids. The I3 is considerably larger than the I2, which seems to be larger than the not yet recovered I1. Their most striking feature is the buccolingual width, which is much more developed than in any other carnivoran studied. In comparison to the M1, the P4 is large. The m2 is elongated, possessing a much larger paraconid than that of other thaumastocyonines, and the species lacks an M3.

Its scapula is robust and almost square-shaped and possesses a large subscapular fossa and scapular spine, which occupies almost its whole length, while the dorsally developed acromion does not go past the glenoid cavity. The robust humerus possesses a long wide deltoid tuberosity and a large lateral supracondylar crest, but no entepicondylar foramen. The distal epiphysis is wide. Both its radius and ulna are short and robust, with large muscular attachments along the diaphysis.

The manus is robust and short, especially towards the distal segments. Both the carpals and metapodials are short and robust, with the latter possessing a flattened distal epiphyse. The phalanxes are extremely robust, with an almost rounded cross-section. The pelvis and femur are both robust but fragmentary, with the latter being relatively short. The robust tibia possesses a wide proximal epiphysis and short diaphysis, the triangular cross-section of its distal diaphysis possessing relatively oblique, deep, and reinforced articulation sulci for the astragalus.

Its pes is wide and short, particularly towards the distal segments, while the robust tarsals have few contact facets. The short calcaneus has solid articulation facets for the astragalus and a concave distal one for the cuboid. Almost no distal neck is present at the astragalus, but it has a convex articular facet for the navicular. The articulation facet between the cuboid and navicular is absent. Articulations gradually become less mobile towards the distal parts of the limb, with some being ankylosed or completely immobile. It possesses short and robust metatarsals, with flattened distal epiphyses, as well as short and extremely robust phalanxes, with an almost rounded cressection and a short and thickened claw.

== Phylogeny and evolution ==
Ammitocyon belongs to the subfamily Thaumastocyoninae, originally erected by Hürzeler (1940), which is defined by the complete suppression of m1 metaconid, reduction of the premolars, except the p4, which is reinforced, and the oblique abrasion of the teeth, and possesses hypercarnivorous tendencies. Within the subfamily its sister taxon is Thaumastocyon.

Below is the cladogram based on cranial, mandibular, and dental characters, after Morales et al., 2021:

- Pseudocyonopsis landesquei
- - - Daphoenodon superbus
    - Cynelos lemanensis
    - "Ysengrinia" americana
    - Thaumastocyoninae
      - Crassidia intermedia
      - - Ysengrinia gerandia
        - - Peignecyon felinoides
          - - Tomocyon grivensis
            - - "Ysengrinia" valentiana
              - Agnotherium antiquum
              - - ''Ammitocyon kainos
                - - Thaumastocyon bourgeoisi
                  - Thaumastocyon dirus

== Paleobiology ==
Ammitocyon possess many traits that can be found in other carnivorans, but their association with each other is exclusive to this genus. Its chewing apparatus is completely unique, with no equivalent existing among other hypercarnivores. It possesses strong dental simplification, and a second carnassial pair is formed by m1 talonid and m2 occluding with the M1-M2 buccal wall. The robustness of canines and incisors combined with slender postcanine dentition is a common feature in thaumastocyonines, but is far more developed in Ammitocyon, with its extremely sectorial dentition, than in related taxa such as Thaumastocyon or Crassidia.

The insertion of the M. masseter into the mandible is narrowed and the attachment aera for the m. masseter pars zygomaticomandibularis posterior, the muscle responsible for the main grinding movements of the jaw, in the mandible has almost completely disappeared. This, in addition to the development of large temporalis and digastricus muscles, may be a sign that Ammitocyon favored slicing over chewing, which is consistent with the shape of its teeth.

A biomechanical analysis suggests the mandible was more resistant to mediolateral than dorsoventral movements. The mesial constitutes the least resistant part of the mandible, and the symphysis is the only one capable of resisting dorsoventral and lateral movements. The result is that Ammitocyon occupies a morphospace not known in any other amphicyonid, canid, or carnivoran included in the study, with a mandibular ramus more resistant to mediolateral bending, but less dorsoventral resistance than seen in any of the species it has been compared with.

This is in accordance with the large incisors and wide canines, which may have acted as a throat or muzzle clamp, and helped to tear off the prey's skin. The large buccolingual resistance to bending suggests its ability to tear off flesh while violently moving its head from side to side, similar to movements observed in pinnipeds. The low resistance to dorsoventral bending, and P4 and m1 forming a shearing surface, while M1 and m2 acting as second cutting area, shows that it was likely unable to feed on hard matter, such as bones, unlike many other amphicyonids.

The postcranial skeleton has not been closely described, but it is extremely robust, even exceeding that of bears in many areas, possessing short limbs and metapodials not unlike those seen in Thylacosmilus. strengthened articulations in some of its bones prevent lateral movements, especially in the hind limbs, with some features being similar to those of cursorial mammals. Some of its metapodials completely lack flexing ability. The shortness of its phalanxes means the animal could not walk in a digitigrade position, as the surface area would have been too small to carry its weight. Nevertheless, reconstructing the taxon as plantigrade also leads to some discrepancies that only further studies can solve.

== Paleoecology ==
The paleoenvironment of Batallones-3 has been reconstructed as mesic C3 woodland, with patches of grassland. Ammitocyon shared this habitat with several other large carnivorans, each of them surpassing 100 kg in weight - the somewhat smaller bear dog Magericyon anceps, the ursid Indarctos arctoides, and the lion-sized saber-toothed cat Machairodus aphanistus. The carnivoran assemblage was further enriched by the leopard-sized Promegantereon ogygia, the mustelid Eomellivora piveteaui, comparable to a brown hyaena in size, as well as the smaller felid Leptofelis vallesiensis, the hyaena Protictitherium crassum, the mephitid Promephitis, and a number of smaller mustelids. The most common large herbivore is the equid Hipparion, although the suid Microstonyx, the moschid Micromeryx, the antelope Austroportax, and another unidentified bovid, as well as indeterminate rhinoceros remains have also been found. A variety of rodents and the lagomorph Prolagus make up the small mammal fauna, while non-mammals are represented by the sea eagle Haliaeetus, the monitor lizard Varanus marathonensis, and the giant tortoise Titanochelon.

Among the four very large carnivorans, all of which likely were solitary hunters, only Magericyon differs significantly from the others in regard to prey, as it predominately hunted in open woodlands and commonly consumed Austroportax, while Machairodus, Indarctos, and Ammitocyon most frequently preyed on Hipparion in wooded areas. The much smaller Eomellivora seems to also have commonly fed on the equid, though it lived in more open areas, and has been reconstructed as feeding on smaller prey, perhaps suggesting it may have taken foals or scavenged.

Coexistence of these large predators despite overlaps of resources and habitat may have been the result of high biomass availability.
