= Paranotiosorex =

Paranotiosorex Temporal range: Pliocene

Scientific classification
- Kingdom: Animalia
- Phylum: Chordata
- Class: Mammalia
- Order: Eulipotyphla
- Family: Soricidae
- Genus: †Paranotiosorex
- Species: †P. panacaensis

Binomial name
- †Paranotiosorex panacaensis Mou, 2011

Extinct genus of mammals

Paranotiosorex is an extinct genus of shrew that lived during the Pliocene.

== Distribution ==
Paranotiosorex panacaensis is known from the Panaca Formation of Nevada.
