= Amphiprox =

Amphiprox Temporal range: Mid Miocene

Scientific classification
- Domain: Eukaryota
- Kingdom: Animalia
- Phylum: Chordata
- Class: Mammalia
- Order: Artiodactyla
- Family: Cervidae
- Genus: †Amphiprox; Haupt, 1933
- Species: †A. anocerus

Binomial name
- †Amphiprox anocerus Kaup, 1833

Synonyms
- Cervus anocerus Kaup, 1833

Extinct genus of deer

Amphiprox is an extinct genus of early deer from the Miocene of Europe.

== Taxonomy ==
Amphiprox anocerus was originally placed in the genus Cervus, along with many other early deer. It was related to other primitive deer like Euprox and Heteroprox and together these early forms represent the first major radiation of cervids.

== Description ==
Amphiprox was a small deer, around 25 kg (55 lb) in weight. It was rather long-legged and had small two-pronged antlers.

== Paleoecology ==
The long legs of Amphiprox indicate that it may have been adapted to more open habitats, and perhaps even mountainous ones. The teeth suggest it was a grazer, or even an omnivore.
