= Hiskatherium =

Hiskatherium Temporal range: Mid Miocene (Friasian-Mayoan) ~15.97–11.608 Ma

Scientific classification
- Domain: Eukaryota
- Kingdom: Animalia
- Phylum: Chordata
- Class: Mammalia
- Order: Pilosa
- Superfamily: Megatherioidea
- Genus: †Hiskatherium; Pujos et al. 2011
- Species: †H. saintandrei

Binomial name
- †Hiskatherium saintandrei Pujos et al. 2011

Extinct genus of ground sloths

Hiskatherium is an extinct genus of small ground sloth from the Middle Miocene (Friasian to Mayoan) Honda Group of Bolivia. The type species H. saintandrei was named in 2011 on the basis of a lower jaw. Although it has not been placed in a specific family, Hiskatherium is similar to the extinct sloths Hapalops and Xyophorus.
