= Repomys =

Repomys Temporal range: Pliocene

Scientific classification
- Domain: Eukaryota
- Kingdom: Animalia
- Phylum: Chordata
- Class: Mammalia
- Order: Rodentia
- Family: Cricetidae
- Genus: †Repomys; May 1981

Species
- Repomys arizonensis Tomida 1987; Repomys gustelyi May 1981; Repomys maxumi May 1981; Repomys panacaensis May 1981

Extinct genus of rodents

Repomys is an extinct genus of Cricetidae that existed during the late Hemphillian and Blancan periods.

== List of species ==
- Repomys arizonensis Tomida, 1987
- Repomys gustelyi May 1981
- Repomys maxumi May 1981
- Repomys panacaensis May 1981
