= Sairadelphys =

Sairadelphys Temporal range: Pleistocene ~2.6–0.01 Ma

Scientific classification
- Kingdom: Animalia
- Phylum: Chordata
- Class: Mammalia
- Infraclass: Marsupialia
- Order: Didelphimorphia
- Family: Didelphidae
- Subfamily: Hyladelphinae
- Genus: †Sairadelphys; E.V. Oliveira et al., 2011

Type species
- †Sairadelphys tocantinensis E.V. Oliveira et al., 2011

Species
- †Sairadelphys tocantinensis

Extinct genus of marsupials

Sairadelphys is an extinct genus of didelphine opossums from the Pleistocene of South America.

== Taxonomy ==
Sairadelphys is a didelphine opossum, described as a sister taxon to Hyladelphys. Sairadelphys tocantinensis is the only recognized species, and it is known from deposits in the Gruta dos Mouras cave, Tocantins, Brazil.

== Biology ==
The more flattened molars of Sairadelphys indicate of diet of both fruit and insects. It had an estimated mass of less than 40 g.
