= Turiasorex =

Turiasorex Temporal range: Miocene, 13–10 Ma

Scientific classification
- Kingdom: Animalia
- Phylum: Chordata
- Class: Mammalia
- Infraclass: Placentalia
- Order: Eulipotyphla
- Family: Soricidae
- Genus: †Turiasorex van Dam, Hoek Ostende & Reumer, 2011

Type species
- †T. pierremeini van Dam, Hoek Ostende & Reumer, 2011

Extinct genus of shrew

Turiasorex is an extinct genus of shrew which existed in east central Spain, during the middle and late Miocene. Its fossils have been recovered from the Calatayud-Daroca and Teruel basins, Spain. It was first named by Jan A. van Dam, Lars W. van den Hoek Ostende and Jelle W. F. Reumer in 2011 and the type species is Turiasorex pierremeini.
