= Paronychomys =

Paronychomys Temporal range: Late Miocene

Scientific classification
- Domain: Eukaryota
- Kingdom: Animalia
- Phylum: Chordata
- Class: Mammalia
- Order: Rodentia
- Family: Cricetidae
- Genus: †Paronychomys; Jacobs, 1977

Extinct genus of rodents

Paronychomys is an extinct genus of Cricetidae that existed in Arizona during the Hemphillian period.

== Taxonomy ==
Three species of Paronychomys are known: P. alticuspis, P. lemredfieldi, and P. tuttlei. "Paronychomys" shotwelli, described by Korth (2011) from Hemphilian-age deposits in Oregon, is now placed in the separate genus Tsaphanomys.
