= Mesoprocta =

Mesoprocta Temporal range: Middle Miocene

Scientific classification
- Kingdom: Animalia
- Phylum: Chordata
- Class: Mammalia
- Infraclass: Placentalia
- Order: Rodentia
- Family: Dasyproctidae
- Genus: †Mesoprocta; Croft et al., 2011
- Species: †M. hypsodus

Binomial name
- †Mesoprocta hypsodus Croft et al., 2011

Extinct genus of mammals

Mesoprocta is an extinct genus of dasyproctid rodent that inhabited Bolivia during the Middle Miocene and that is known from a single species, M. hypsodus.
