= Delotrochanter =

Delotrochanter Temporal range: Oligocene to Early Miocene, ~27–22 Ma

Scientific classification
- Domain: Eukaryota
- Kingdom: Animalia
- Phylum: Chordata
- Class: Mammalia
- Order: Carnivora
- Family: †Amphicyonidae
- Subfamily: †Temnocyoninae
- Genus: †Delotrochanter; Hunt, 2011

Type species
- †Delotrochanter oryktes Hunt, 2011

Other species
- Delotrochanter major Hunt, 2011; Delotrochanter petersoni Hunt, 2011

Extinct genus of large-sized carnivoran mammals

Delotrochanter is an extinct genus of large-sized carnivoran mammals, belonging to the Amphicyonidae ("bear dogs"), that lived in the Great Plains of North America during the Oligocene to Early Miocene. This genus includes some of the largest and last surviving members of the subfamily Temnocyoninae. it furthermore possesses adaptions towards both bone-crushing and cursoriality.

== History and naming ==
While fossils belonging to Delotrochanter were known since the early 1900s, neither the genus nor the species belonging to it were described until Robert Hunt Jr. revised the subfamily Temnocyoninae in 2011.

Delotrochanter petersoni is not only the geologically oldest species of the genus, but its remains were also the first to be discovered. A pair of damaged lower jaws (CM 1603) and associated remains were found by Olaf Peterson in May 1904 in the Pine Ridge escarpment near the head of Warbonnet Creek, Nebraska. The exact stratigraphic level where they were discovered is uncertain, but it was collected within the upper 400 ft (ca. 122 m) of the Arikaree Group in northwestern Sioux County. Despite being the first temnocyonines discovered in the Great Plains, Peterson's lack of familiarity led him to identify them as an indeterminate canid (during this time amphicyonids were classified as members of the dog family).

Several fossil remains belonging to Delotrochanter oryktes have been discovered within the Agate Fossil Beds National Monument. The first of these was found by F.B. Loomis at the Stenomylus Quarry, and originally identified as Daphoenodon superbus. It represents one of the most complete temnocyonine skeletons known (ACM 4804), even including some bones of a juvenile associated with the skeleton of the adult. Loomis never described the fossil, and it was damaged when it was pressed into a wall of wet plaster at the Amherst College Museum, and was first described by Mildred Schlain in 1980 in an unpublished master study. A calcaneum belonging to this species was discovered in the Carnegie Hill bonebeds in 1914. Most impressively, a crushed skull (UNSM 47800) and associated postcranial remains were discovered in a den at Beardog Hill, alongside numerous specimens of Daphoenodon superbus.

Paul Miller discovered fragmented lower jaws and isolated upper teeth belonging to Delotrochanter major near Van Tassell in 1927. These derive from the Anderson Ranch Formation, formerly known as Upper Harrison Beds, and represent the youngest, as well as largest, known remains of this genus.

Its generic name is a combination of Ancient Greek δῆλος (delos), meaning "evident", and τροχαντήρ (trokhantḗr), meaning "runner", emphasizing its cursorial adaptions. The species name of the type species, ὀρυκτήρ (oruktḗr) is also of Ancient Greek origin and means “digger”, as one specimen was discovered in a burrow. Meanwhile, D. petersoni is named in honour of its discoverer, whereas the name of D. major is of Latin origin (maior meaning "greater") and references its large size.

== Description ==
Delotrochanter shows a considerable size increase over the course of its evolution, with the geologically oldest species D. petersoni being somewhat smaller than a wolf. The two younger species are among the largest temnocyonines, which weighed up to 65–80 kg, with D. major being considerably larger than D. oryktes.

It possessed a short, broad skull with a deep zygomata, large temporal fossae, which suggest well-developed temporal jaw musculature and a jaw depth far exceeding that of any extant canid. In these aspects it resembles a spotted hyaena, although it lacks the hyaenas wider palate, and has more inflated frontal region as well as a more massive snout with larger canines. Its infraorbital ramen was also much larger, suggesting that the neurovascular supply to the nasal region was more developed. It furthermore possesses the largest known braincase of any temnocyonine.

Its dentition was durophagous and adapted towards crushing, differing from Mammacyon by the proportions of its carnassial-molar battery, with its blunt-cusped cheek teeth being unlike those of any canid or hyaena. The mandible is deep, but thin. Its lower canine is not as strongly recurved as in some species of Temnocyon, and is proportionally much larger than in a wolf. The first lower premolar is not preserved, while the second one is double-rooted tall, but anteroposteriorly short, lacking a posterior accessory cusp. The third premolar is short and posteriorly wide, whereas the fourth is robust and much larger. It possesses a large posterior accessory cusp, located centrally on an expanded heel behind the principal cusp. This feature is not found in any other temnocyonine. The principal cusps of all premolars are of pronounced height. The first molar is a crushing carnassial, and its nearly equal development of paraconid and hypoconid flanking the protoconid is typical for both this genus and Mammacyon, although its somewhat larger hypoconid showcases the greater adaptions towards crushing in Delotrochanter. The second molar is rectangular in occlusal view, and its cusps form a crushing battery posterior to the carnassial blade.

Its central upper incisors are much smaller than the outer one. The upper canine is of similar length to the lower one. The first premolar is small, while the second one is much larger, with a similar shortening as the p2 in the lower jaw. P3 is of similar height as P2, but posteriorly, and has a small accessory cusp situated slightly labially on the posterior slope. The massive fourth premolar possesses a short metastylar blade, which forms a moderately developed shear surface with the large paracone. The rounded and blunt paracone is enlarged for crushing, but not as massive as in Mammacyon. The first molar possesses a vertical shear surface, which is not quite as developed as in large species of Temnocyon, and is formed by the lingual faces of the paracone and metacone. A flat crushing platform, which is surrounded by a much thickened lingual platform, is formed as the protocone is isolated within an enamel platform. This shear surface continues on the much smaller second molar. The third upper molar is absent, as in all temnocyonines.

Delotrochanter showcases several adaptions towards cursoriality, among them the lengthening of limbs and metapodials, with the lower limbs and feet being proportionally longer. Its scapula is similar to contemporary amphicyonids, such as Daphoenodon, and most similar to felids among extant carnivorans. The humerus is straight-shafted, as in all large temnocyonines, and the proximal ulna is similar to a wolf, as it is mediolaterally compressed and thin. The close registration of the joint surfaces of the feet did not progress to the same extent as in Canis lupus, although its tarsal structure, the apposition of the metapodials, and reliance on the paraxonic foot, i.e. the weight is supported on the third and fourth metapodial, with the other three being greatly reduced, which is even greater than in wolves, showcase their cursorial adaptions. The femorotibial proportions approach those of a wolf. Their tibia also possesses a prominent groove, the sulcus muscularis, which is well-developed among many ungulates, but only rarely among carnivorans, except for canines and cheetahs. Their long and slender femur is slightly curved in the sagittal plane, similar to a wolf, but its the femoral head and neck are almost at a right angle to the diaphysis. All this suggests that their stance as straight-legged and digitigrade, and that it possessed the most extreme cursorial adaptions of any temnocyonine.

== Classification and evolution ==
Delotrochanter is a member of the subfamily Temnocyoninae, which was endemic to North America during the Oligocene to the earliest Miocene. It is part of a late Oligocene radiation, which resulted in the emergence of large hypercarnivores (Temnocyon) and durophages (Mammacyon and Delotrochanter) in the Great Plains. The earliest members of the subfamily date to ca. 29 Ma, and were rather small generalists. The oldest species of Delotrochanter, D. petersoni, was much larger than these early fox-sized taxons, and already showed durophagous adaptions, although these were not yet as developed as in later species. Its age is not securely known, but likely around 27-26 Ma. The appearance and diversification of larger temnocyonines was likely correlated with the extinction of nimravids, until then the continent's dominant hypercarnivores, around 25 Ma. Another important factor in their evolution is the emergence of grasslands and open woodlands in the Great Planes during the Late Oligocene. The cursorial adaptions of these temnocyonines would have helped them to traverse large distances in this habitat, whereas their durophagous dentition would have helped them to both hunt large prey and process carcasses in this harsh, semi-arid climate, in which droughts were not uncommon. The Late Oligocene was an epoch of warm temperatures, but it was followed by a sudden cold interval at the start of the Miocene at around 23 Ma. Alongside favoring the spread of grasslands, this enabled the migration of Eurasian carnivorans and ungulates into North America. The oldest fossils of Delotrochanter oryktes date to this period. Interestingly, this postdates the extinction of Mammacyon ferocior, suggesting that large Delotrochanter only emerged after the disappearance of this big, durophagous temnocyonine. Warmer temperatures returned shortly afterwards, and central North America was covered by savanna during the early Miocene. D. oryktes was much larger and better adapted towards durophagy than D. petersoni, but the terminal species D. major was even larger, and possessed more massive teeth than its ancestors. It was among the last temnocyonines, alongside the hypercarnivorous Temnocyon macrogenys. The exact age of the Anderson Range Formation, but it dates to the latest Arikareean. No temnocyonines appear past the Arikareean-Hemingfordian faunal turnover, when Amphicyon as well as large, cursorial Daphoenodon appear in North America for the first time.

== Palaeobiology ==
Several features of large temnocyonines, such as Delotrochanter, like their prominent canines and incisors, deep jaws and broad snouts are also found in large canids adapted towards hunting prey larger than themselves. In addition to their tall and well-developed premolars, these features indicate their ability to grasp and hold large prey. Their deep jaws, strong mandibular symphysis, and canines showcase the strength and leverage of their bite, while their rather blunt carnassials and broad molars allowed them to crush and grind hard food items. All three species of Delotrochanter show bending strength levels similar to a spotted hyaena. Among both extant, large carnivorans and temnocyonines, bending strength is greater in the mediolateral than the anteroposterior axis. D. oryktes has values between large cats and spotted hyaenas in both these areas, suggesting strong resistance to forces applied at the symphysis. Their elongated limbs, paraxonic feet, and digitigrade stance indicates that they were cursorial predators. Their forelimbs were ill-adapted for grasping prey. Overall, their ecology was likely similar to cursorial, bone-crushing hyaenas.

The smaller size and more gracile build of the geologically younger specimen of D. oryktes suggests that it was female, and that there was notable sexual dimorphism within the species. Fossils of D. oryktes have been found in a burrow in association with Daphoenodon. The evolution of denning behaviour likely represents an adaption to the emergence of open grasslands, as pups need to be concealed and protected, while the adults pursued prey over large distances.

== Palaeoenvironment ==
During the earliest Miocene, the Great Plains were covered by grasslands and savanna, with shrubs and trees mostly growing near rivers and streams. The climate was semi-arid and continental, with droughts being a rather common occurrence. One of the most notable fossils of Delotrochanter oryktes was found at Beardog Hill, where it and several other carnivorans were found in burrows located rather closely to a waterhole. Among them is the similar sized Daphoenodon superbus, which had a wolf like detention, and was also capable of cracking bone, even if it lacked the durophagous adaptions of Delotrochanter. The large mustelid Megalictis simplicidens was also capable of processing tough food. Smaller carnivorans discovered in the dens include Promartes olcotti as well as the tiny canids Phlaocyon annectens and Cormocyon. Herbivoran remains discovered here mostly represent carcasses dragged to the burrows by carnivorans. Over half of these remains are from the oreodont Merychyus, but the gazelle like camel Stenomylus and its larger relative Oxydactylus are also present. The rhinoceros Menoceras is the rarest herbivore in the dens, but it is much more frequently found at the waterhole. Other animals found here include Ysengrinia, a lion-sized amphicyonid of Eurasian origin, and the giant chalicothere Moropus, as well as the huge entelodont Daeodon. These omnivores also possessed durophagous adaptions, but their much larger size indicates that they were able to process carcasses of big herbivores much more easily than Delotrochanter could.
