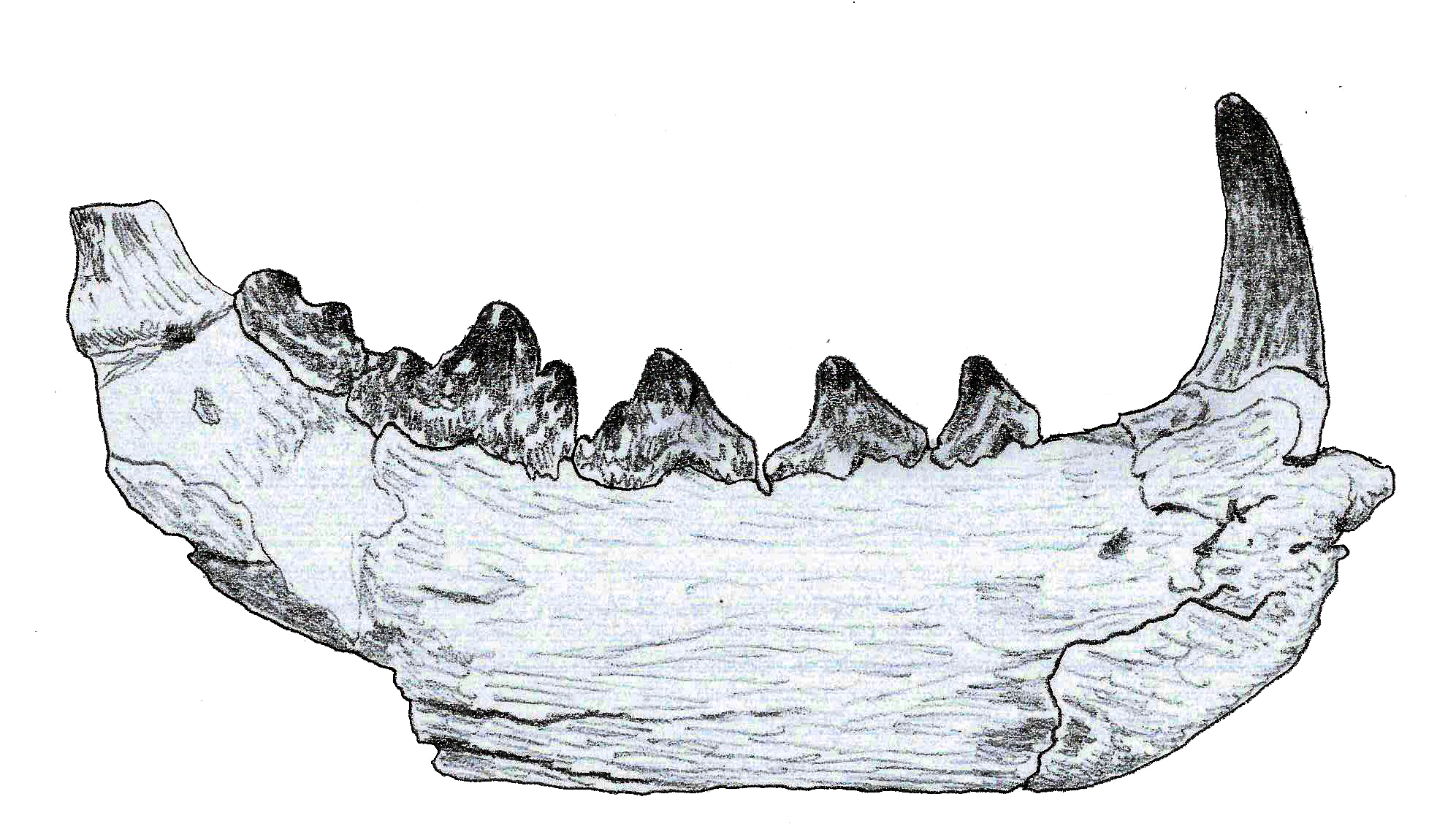
- Mammacyon obtusidens

Scientific classification
- Domain: Eukaryota
- Kingdom: Animalia
- Phylum: Chordata
- Class: Mammalia
- Order: Carnivora
- Family: †Amphicyonidae
- Subfamily: †Temnocyoninae
- Genus: †Mammacyon; Loomis, 1936

Species
- Mammacyon ferocior Hunt Jr., 2011; Mammacyon obtusidens Loomis, 1936

= Mammacyon =

Mammacyon Temporal range: Late Oligocene – Early Miocene

Extinct genus of carnivores

Mammacyon is an extinct genus of medium-sized amphicyonids endemic to North America during the Late Oligocene and Early Miocene. It lived from 26.3 to 20.4 Ma, existing for approximately 6 million years.
