= Lazibemys =

Lazibemys Temporal range: Eocene

Scientific classification
- Kingdom: Animalia
- Phylum: Chordata
- Class: Mammalia
- Infraclass: Placentalia
- Order: Rodentia
- Family: †Zegdoumyidae
- Genus: †Lazibemys; Marivaux et al., 2011
- Species: †L. zegdouensis

Binomial name
- †Lazibemys zegdouensis Marivaux et al., 2011

Extinct genus of mammals

Lazibemys is an extinct genus of zegdoumyid rodent that inhabited Algeria during the Eocene epoch. It contains a single species, L. zegdouensis.
