= Quebradahondomys =

Quebradahondomys Temporal range: Middle Miocene

Scientific classification
- Kingdom: Animalia
- Phylum: Chordata
- Class: Mammalia
- Infraclass: Placentalia
- Order: Rodentia
- Family: Echimyidae
- Subfamily: †Adelphomyinae
- Genus: †Quebradahondomys; Croft et al., 2011
- Species: †Q. potosiensis

Binomial name
- †Quebradahondomys potosiensis Croft et al., 2011

Extinct genus of rodents

Quebradahondomys is an extinct genus of adelphomyine echimyid that lived during the Middle Miocene.

== Distribution ==
Quebradahondomys potosiensis is known from the Quebrada Honda site in Bolivia.
