= Sicista primus =

Sicista primus Temporal range: Burdigalian

Scientific classification
- Kingdom: Animalia
- Phylum: Chordata
- Class: Mammalia
- Order: Rodentia
- Family: Sminthidae
- Genus: Sicista
- Species: †S. primus

Binomial name
- †Sicista primus Kimura, 2011

Extinct species of rodent

Sicista primus is an extinct species of rodent in the genus Sicista that lived during the Burdigalian stage of the Miocene Epoch.

== Distribution ==
Sicista primus fossils are known from the Gashunyinadege fossil site in central Inner Mongolia.
