= Martes ginsburgi =

Martes ginsburgi Temporal range: Late Miocene

Scientific classification
- Kingdom: Animalia
- Phylum: Chordata
- Class: Mammalia
- Infraclass: Placentalia
- Order: Carnivora
- Family: Mustelidae
- Genus: Martes
- Species: †M. ginsburgi

Binomial name
- †Martes ginsburgi Montoya et al., 2011

Extinct species of mammal

Martes ginsburgi is an extinct species of Martes that lived in Spain during the Late Miocene.
