= Temnocyoninae =

Temnocyoninae Temporal range: Early Oligocene–Early Miocene

Scientific classification
- Domain: Eukaryota
- Kingdom: Animalia
- Phylum: Chordata
- Class: Mammalia
- Order: Carnivora
- Family: †Amphicyonidae
- Subfamily: †Temnocyoninae; Hunt, 1998

Genera
- Delotrochanter Hunt Jr. 2011; Temnocyon Cope 1878; Rudiocyon Hunt Jr. 2011; Mammacyon Loomis 1936
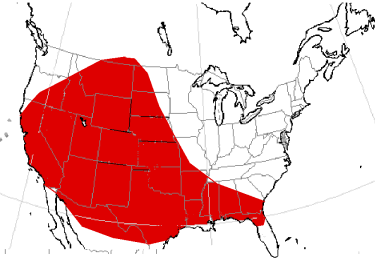
- Range of temnocyonines based on fossil record

Extinct subfamily of carnivores

The Temnocyoninae are an extinct subfamily of medium-sized amphicyonids endemic to North America that lived during the Early Oligocene to Early Miocene about 30.8-20.43 million years ago (Mya) existing for around 10 million years.
