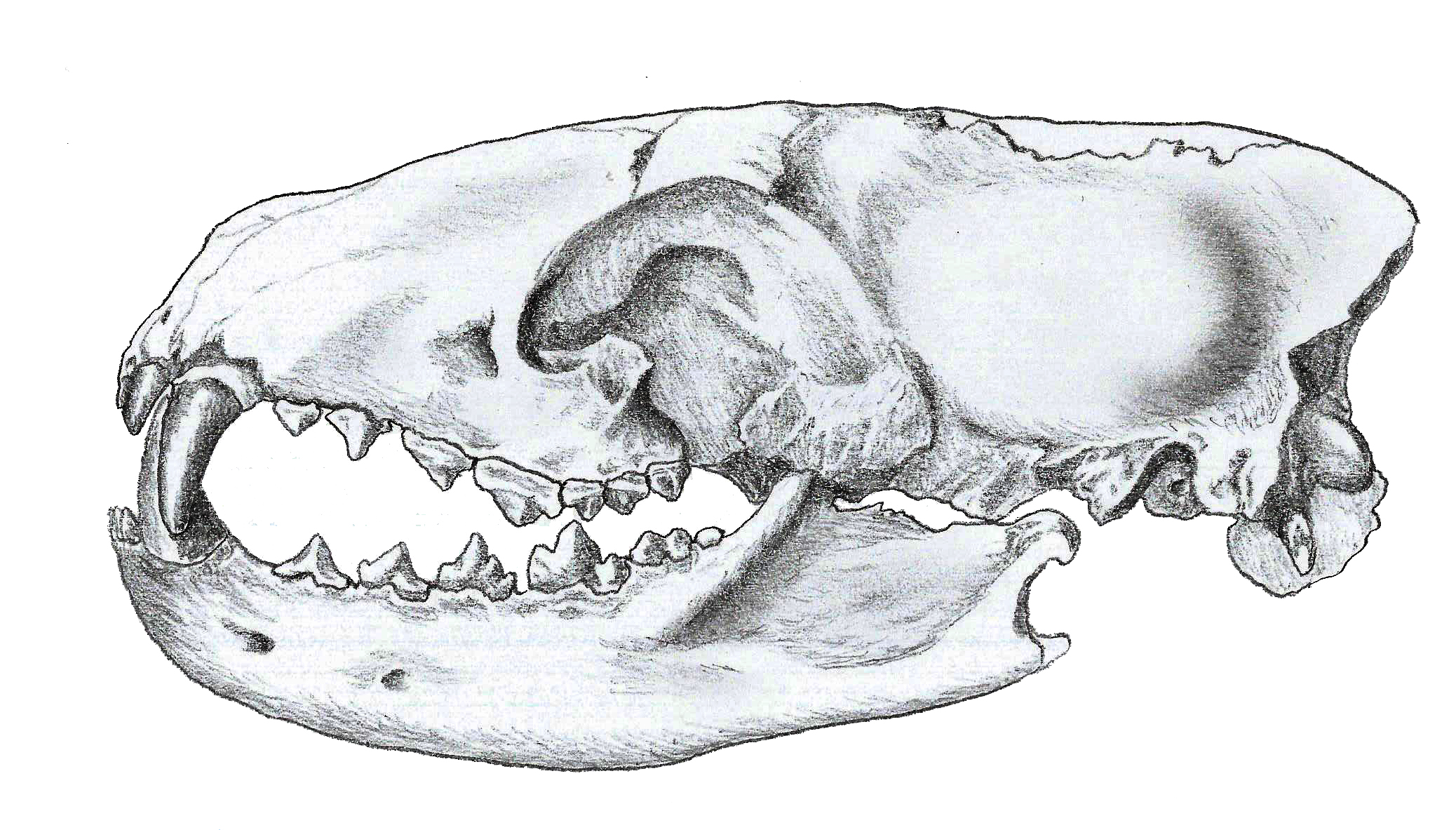
- Skull of Temnocyon ferox

Scientific classification
- Domain: Eukaryota
- Kingdom: Animalia
- Phylum: Chordata
- Class: Mammalia
- Order: Carnivora
- Family: †Amphicyonidae
- Subfamily: †Temnocyoninae
- Genus: †Temnocyon; Cope, 1878

Species
- Temnocyon altigenis Cope, 1878; Temnocyon ferox Eyermann, 1896; Temnocyon fingeruti Hunt jr., 2011; Temnocyon macrogenys Hunt jr., 2011; Temnocyon percussor Cook, 1909; Temnocyon subferox Hunt jr., 2011; Temnocyon typicus Loomis, 1936
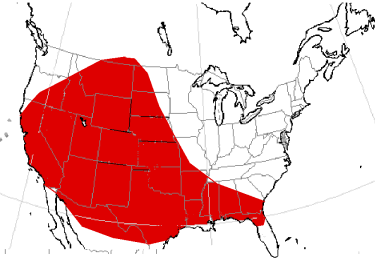
- Range of Temnocyonines based on fossil record

= Temnocyon =

Temnocyon Temporal range: Early Oligocene to Early Miocene 30.8–20.4 Ma

Extinct genus of carnivores

Temnocyon is an extinct genus of amphicyonids endemic to North America. It lived from the Oligocene to Early Miocene approximately 30.8—20.4 mya, existing for about 11 million years.

The first fossils are recorded in North America at Logan Butte in the John Day beds of Oregon, in the Sharps Formation of the Wounded Knee area, South Dakota, and in the Gering Formation at Wildcat Ridge, Nebraska. These early temnocyonines attained the size of coyotes or small wolves (15–30 kg) and are identified by a uniquely specialized dentition. The last documented occurrences of temnocyonines are found in sediments in northwest Nebraska and southeastern Wyoming.
