= Pseudocyonopsis =

Pseudocyonopsis Temporal range: 33.9–28.4 Ma Early Oligocene

Scientific classification
- Kingdom: Animalia
- Phylum: Chordata
- Class: Mammalia
- Order: Carnivora
- Family: †Amphicyonidae
- Genus: †Pseudocyonopsis; Kuss, 1965

Genus of mammals (fossil)

Pseudocyonopsis is a member of the extinct family Amphicyonidae, a terrestrial carnivore belonging to the order Caniformia.

Pseudocyonopsis was named by Kuss in 1965 and was assigned to Amphicyonidae by Carroll (1988).

== Species ==
- P. ambiguus
- P. antiquus
- P. quercensis
