= Paludocyon =

Paludocyon Temporal range: Early Miocene to Middle Miocene, 20–15.9 Ma
- Skull of Paludocyon moyasolai

Scientific classification
- Kingdom: Animalia
- Phylum: Chordata
- Class: Mammalia
- Order: Carnivora
- Family: †Amphicyonidae
- Subfamily: †Amphicyoninae
- Genus: †Paludocyon; Morales et al., 2021

Type species
- Pseudocyon bohemicus Schlosser, 1899

Species
- †P. helbingi Dehm, 1950; †P. acutidens Dehm, 1950; †P. dietrichi Dehm, 1950; †P. moyasolai Morales et al., 2026

Extinct genus of carnivores

Paludocyon (from Latin: paludes, 'swamp' and Greek: κύων, cyon, 'dog') is an extinct genus of amphicyonids, a group known colloquially as "bear-dogs". Its type species, P. bohemicus, has been known since the 19th Century, but its affinities had long been in doubt, having variously been assigned to a number of other genera. It was only established as a distinct genus in the 2020s, after a review of Czech amphicyonids, which was followed by the reassigment of several other taxa originally described in 1950 to Paludocyon. Its members include medium-sized amphicyonids, that were distributed throughout Europe during the Early Miocene, with fossils being found in Czechia, Germany, France, and Spain.

== Taxonomy ==
Fossils, which includes several teeth, as well as a mandible, belonging to the type species of this genus were discovered at the site of Tuchořice, in the Czech Republic, during the 19th Century, and originally assigned to the species Amphicyon intermedius (now known as Crassidia intermedia) by Suess, following a conversation with Herrmann von Meyer.

In 1899, Schlosser noted that the remains, which included numerous premolars and molars belonging to a single individual, represented a distinct species, which he named Pseudocyon bohemicus. On the basis of drawings of Suess, he argued that the unique cusps of the molars clearly differentiated it from the known species of Amphicyon, and that the same species was also present at the locality Weisenau, near Mainz. Two years later, he reassigned this species back to the genus Amphicyon, as A. bohemicus, because being able to view the original material made him notice several distinctions. In the following decades, its taxonomic position remained disputed, with Kuss arguing in 1965 that it was a subspecies of Amphicyon steinheimensis, with A. s. bohemicus being the ancestor of the nominal subspecies A. s. steinheimensis, while assigning a molar as new lectotype. He corrected what he viewed as mistakes of Schlosser, such as a too Pseudocyon-like reconstruction of the second lower molar, arguing that Schlosser did not render the understanding of this species a favor with his dental combinations and reconstructions. Kuss furthermore argued that A. s. bohemicus was identitical with the species described by Dehm as A. dietrichi fifteen years earlier. The assignment to A. steinheimensis was not followed by later authors, though Ginsburg saw them as closely related members of one lineage, for which he subgenus Heizmannocyon. Peigne et al. viewed the latter as synonymous with Cynelos. Therefore, they renamed the species from Czechia Cynelos bohemicus. (Note: However, they did not assign the species formerly known as Amphicyon steinheimensis to the genus Cynelos, instead placing it in Pseudocyon.) Finally, in a 2021 revision of Tuchořice amphicyonids, Morales et al. erected the new genus Paludocyon, named after the swampy environment of Tuchořice, with P. bohemicus serving as its type species. A study by the same lead authors in 2026 described the species P. moyasolai from Spain, while also reassigning three species described by Dehm to this genus.

=== Species ===
P. acutidens

This species was originally described by Dehm as Amphicyon acutidens in 1950, with parts of the jaws, and associated teeth, serving as the holotype. It was discovered at the early Miocene locality of Wintershof-West, in Bavaria. Dehm established two more species, A. dietrichi and A. helbingi, from the locality in the same publication. He noted that A. acutidens overlapped with A. helbingi in terms of size, but while he commented on the great similarity and close relationship between the two, he viewed them as distinct. According to him, A. acutidens had a 'sharper' dentition (from which the species name derives), and the reduction of the M² compared to the M¹ has progressed even further than among A. helbingi, while the latter has a longer p₂ and a bigger m₂. This was not followed by many subsequent authors, with acutidens instead being seen as a junior synonym to helbingi.

P. bohemicus

Established as the type species of the genus in 2021, P. bohemicus had a difficult taxonomic history, with previous authors having considered it a species of Amphicyon, Cynelos, Heizmannocyon or Pseudocyon. It was originally discovered at the Czech site Tuchořice during the 19th century, and is known from several remains, including a mandible and various teeth. The species has also been reported from the Halamagai Formation in China, and at Thenay in France, which would extend its temporal range to MN 5, though these have been dismissed by Morales et al., who rather suggest these remains are closer to P. helbingi and Heizmannocyon, respectively.

The holotype of Paludocyon acutidens

P. dietrichi

Two fragments of a maxilla belonging to Paludocyon dietrichi

Paludocyon dietrichi is one of the species from Wintershof-West described by Dehm, who originally attributed it to the genus Amphicyon. The holotype is a partial lower jaw, while another jaw fragment is known from the same locality, as is a partial snout. He described it as a large species, comparable in size to Crassidia. (Note: The species Amphicyon crassidens, which Dehm compared it to, has since been synonymized with Crassidia intermedia.) The species name was erected in honor of Wilhelm Otto Dietrich. Kuss viewed the species as junior synonym to P. bohemicus, in which he was followed by a number of later authors. Morales et al. challenged this in 2021, reviving P. dietrichi as distinct species, though they viewed it as more closely associated with Pseudocyon. However, a 2026 study by the same lead authors, which assigned dietrichi to Paludocyon, recovered P. dietrichi and P. bohemicus as each other's closest relatives.
P. helbingi

Holotype of Paludocyon helbingi

As two other members of the genus, P. helbingi was originally described by Dehm as a new species of Amphicyon discovered at Wintershof-West. Its name is a tribute to Hans Helbings. The holotype is a fragmentary jaw, though numerous other fragments and numerous teeth have also been discovered, which includes those of juveniles as well. As the teeth show remarkable differences in size, with the lengths of the first lower molars ranging from 19.8 to 27.1 mm, Dehm was at first skeptical should really be treated as a singular species. For Kuss, this taxon was a subspecies of Cynelos lemanensis, with acutidens being its synonym. Later authors followed Kuss in synonymizing helbingi and acutidens, though they treated the former as a distinct species, rather than a mere subspecies. P. helbingi is the oldest member of the genus in Europe, and has been found across localities in Germany, Spain, and France, though the assignment of many of these is tentative. It is securely known from sites dating to MN 3 and MN 4 (with the youngest occurrences at Buñol and Erkertshofen 2), though it has also been reported from Selles-sur-Cher, which would extend its range to late MN 2. These remains have alternatively been assigned to Cynelos lemanensis, and Hunt has suggested that they represent a traditional form between the two species. Remains with affinities to P. helbingi have been reported in the Chinese Halamagai Formation, which is somewhat younger, correlating to the MN 5.

P. moyasolai

Discovered at the site of els Casot in Catalonia, part of the Vallès-Penedès Basin, P. moyasolai was described in 2026. The holotype is an almost complete, but crushed, skull, with the snout being badly preserved. An isolated lower molar, likely belonging to the same individual, has also been discovered. It differs from other members of the genus in the shape of its upper molars, with the M¹ being broader compared to the M². The third molar is more well developed, and has well-defined anterior cusps. Compared to P. bohemicus, the fourth premolar is shorter. Its name honors Salvador Moyà-Solà, in honor of his role in the development of European paleomastology.

=== Phylogeny and evolutionary relationships ===
The close relationship between members of this genus and Cynelos has long been recognized. Already Dehm suggested that P. helbingi, closely affiliated with P. dietrichi, is a descendant of Cynelos lemanensis, in which he was followed by a variety of other authors, including Kuss and Ginsburg. The close relationship was supported by Hunt, who suggested that the fossils from Selles-sur-Cher represented a transitional form between the two species. Peigne & Heizmann considered this close relationship to be less obvious, noting the clear dental differences between the two. It has also been proposed that P. bohemicus descends from C. lemanensis, though Kuss is skeptical of the idea, as he considered the two taxa to be coeval. However, he did consider it ancestral to Heizmannocyon steinheimensis (in his classification, Amphicyon steinheimensis steinheimensis), an idea that was followed by Ginsburg.

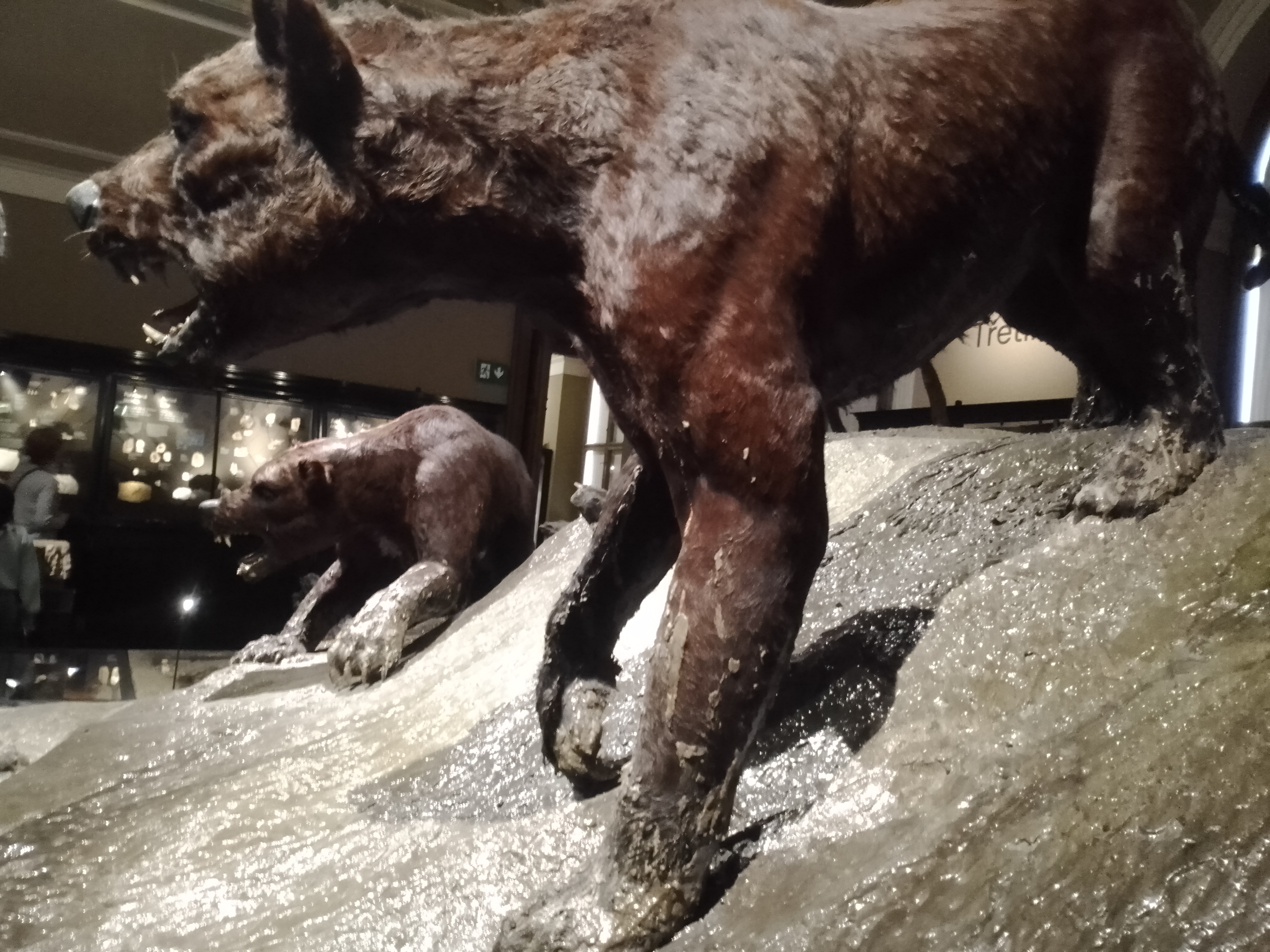
Sculpture depicting Paludocyon bohemicus

The traditional classification system was increasingly challenged by Morales et al., who considered the genus Cynelos, with species described across Europe, Asia, Africa, and North America, to have been a wastebasket-taxon, with many of its supposed species showing remarkable difference to the type species C. lemanensis. They resurrected or established a number of genera previously viewed as part of Cynelos (including Paludocyon), and suggested that it was paraphyletic. According to them, both Cynelos and Paludocyon are members of the tribe Amphicyonini, and their cladistic analysis supports a clade that includes both genera, while excluding Dehmicyon, Absonodaphoenus, Pseudocyonopsis, and Daphoenodon. Within this clade, the species of Paludocyon form a group without the species attributed to Cynelos. For the latter, the North American species are recovered as closer to Paludocyon than to C. lemanensis, though they note that any divergence must have taken place in the late Oligocene or earliest Miocene, and suggest a separate evolutionary history of North American Cynelos species.

Below is a cladogram depicting the phylogenetic relationships of Paludocyon, following Morales et al. (2026).

- Pseudocyonopsis landesquei
- - - Absonodaphoenus caroniavorus
    - Dehmicyon schlosseri
  - - Daphoenodon superbus
    - - Cynelos piveteaui
      - - Cynelos rugosidens
        - - Cynelos lemanensis
          - - Cynelos stenos
            - - Cynelos idoneus
              - - Cynelos malasi
                - - Paludocyon moyasolai
                  - - - Paludocyon acutidens
                      - Paludocyon helbingi
                    - - Paludocyon bohemicus
                      - Paludocyon dietrichi

== Description ==
Life reconstruction of Paludocyon moyasolai

Paludocyon was generally a medium-sized genus of amphicyonids. The basilar skull-length of P. dietrichi has been reconstructed at ~32 cm, much larger than in the American Cynelos malasi (~20 to 22 cm). The body mass of female P. helbingi has been estimated at 60 kg, with males being larger at 86 kg. It is slightly larger than Cynelos lemanensis on average. Another study also estimated P. bohemicus at 86 kg. Dehm noted that P. dietrichi was a large species, comparable in size to Crassidia.

Snout of Paludocyon dietrichi

The diagnostic features of Paludocyon are traits of its dentition, specifically, it is characterized by its small p₄, with a wide talonid, a robust m_{1}, and shortened m₂ in the lower jaw. (Note: In mammal dentition, the letter P stands for premolars, while M stands for the molars. Lowercase letters suggest that a teeth from the lower jaw is discussed, while uppercase letters refer to those from the upper jaw. So p₄ stands for the fourth premolar in the lower jaw, while M³ stands for the third molar in the upper jaw.) The third molars are reduced in both upper and lower jaw. Compared to Cynelos, the posterior molars (M²/M³ and m₂/m₃) are less developed than the first molars. Its crushing dentition is narrower than that of Amphicyon major, and it differs from that genus in the presence of more primitive dental characters, a more compressed snout, narrower m₁ and m₂ as well as generally smaller carnassials and molars. Its lower premolars are reduced compared to Cynelos, Amphicyon, and Heizmannocyon. From the latter it also differs through wider diastemas between its premolars, while its M¹/M² and m₁ are more slender, though the lower molars are more robust than in Pseudocyon. Overall, the trend in Paludocyon is a moderate increase in size of the crushing teeth, the reduced lower premolars, and the widened talonid of the m₁. The upper premolars of P. moyasolai increase in size the farther back they go. Dehm described the jaws of P. dietrichi as considerably more bear-like than those of Crassidia intermedia. The dentition of Paludocyon is relatively hypercarnivorous.

== Paleoecology ==
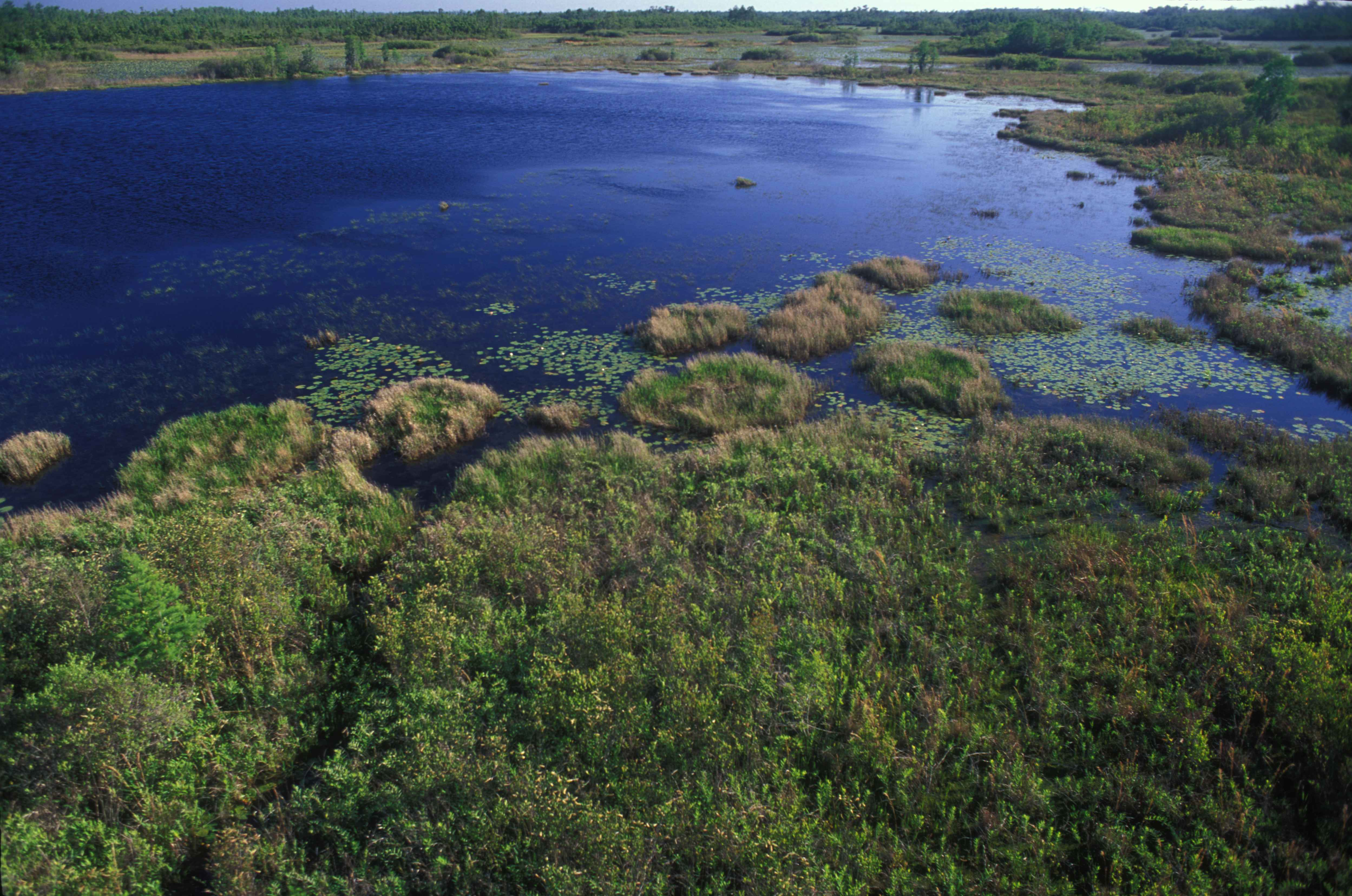
Photo of the Okefenokee. Wetlands in modern Florida likely resemble the paleoenvironment of Tuchořice.

Tuchořice, where Paludocyon bohemicus was discovered, dates to the early Miocene (Mammal Neogene Zone 3), with an absolute age of ~19-18 Ma. The site was loacted at the southern edge of the North Bohemian Lake, an open system of swamps and shallow lakes that formed in the Czech Most Basin during the Burdigalian. It was fed from the south by a small river that entered at Žatec, and itself drained by streams flowing into the North Sea. Tuchořice itself is formed by freshwater limestone, and during the Miocene, it was shaped by numerous mineral hot springs. The springs were surrounded by a riparian forest, from which various lianas hung, formed by maples, elms, hickories, zelkovas, hackberries and date palms. The presence of the latter, alongside some other thermophilous elements, suggests that the mean annual temperature at the site was no less than 18 °C. This humid and warm wetland environment has been compared to that of modern-day northern and central Florida. Water-based taxa found at the site include beavers, abundant turtle remains, and a variety of molluscs. Notable is the abundance of carnivores. This is linked to a 'trapping effect' caused by the hot springs: Predators were attracted to the carcasses of herbivores killed by the gases released by the mineral springs, only to succumb to the carbon dioxide themselves Beyond Paludocyon bohemicus, three more amphcyonids have been found at the locality: the large Amphicyon carnutense, the hypercarnivorous Peignecyon felinoides, and the small Dehmicyon schlosseri. Other carnivorans found at the site include the small ursids Ballusia and Ursavus, as well as the large dog-bear Hemicyon, the viverrid Semigenetta and a variety of mustelids and procyonids. Non-mammalian predators are represented by birds of prey. Herbivores are represented by three species of rhinoceros (Prosantorhinus, Protaceratherium and Aceratherium), chalicotheres, the anthracothere Brachyodus, the suid Aureliachoerus, and the ruminants Palaeomeryx, Lagomeryx, and Amphitragulus. The rodent assemblage is dominated by squirrels, but other families are also present.

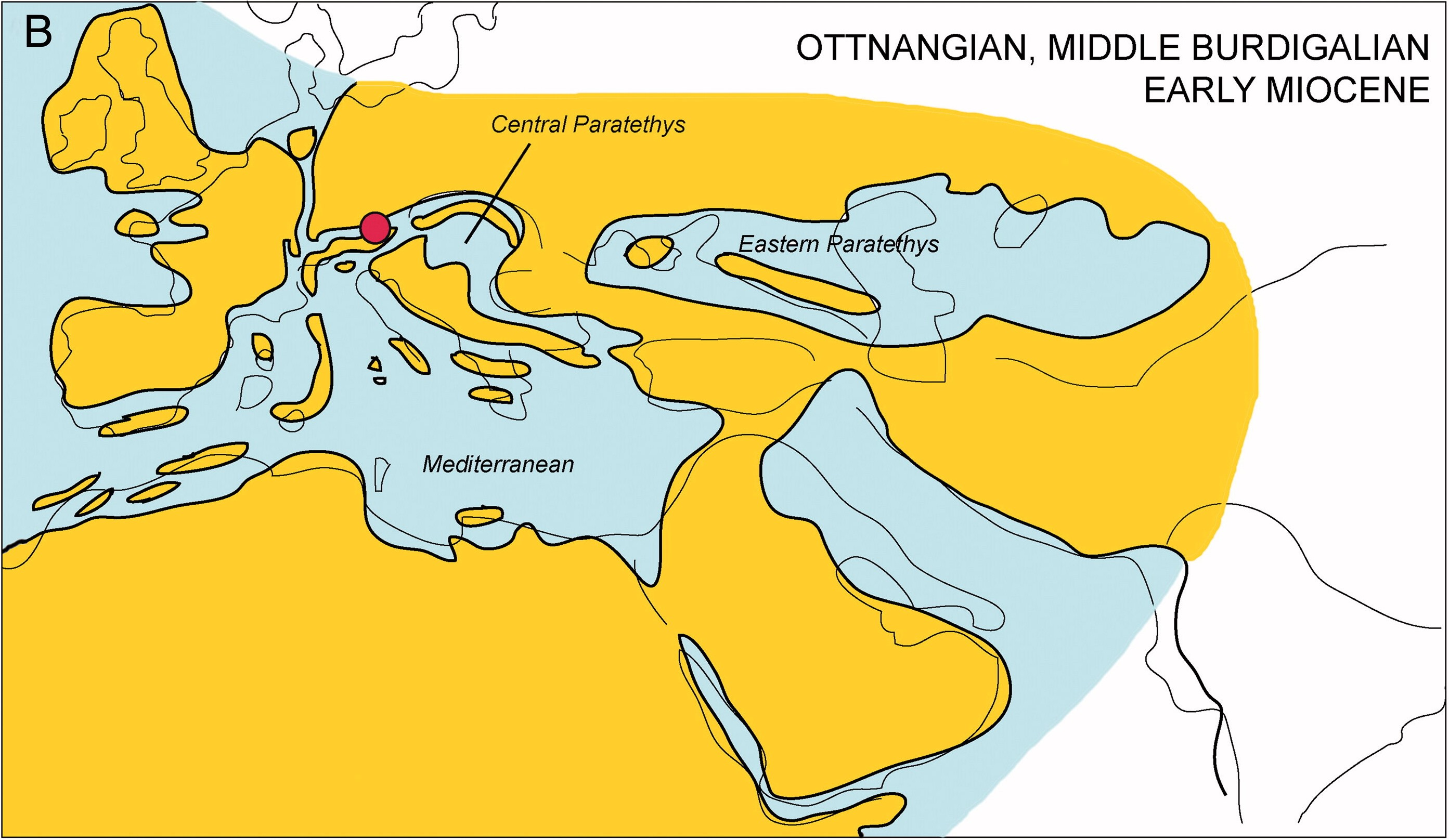
Sketch of Europe and the Paratethys during the early Miocene

Three species of Paludocyon coexisted at the site Wintershof-West in Bavaria, which is one of the richest paleontological sites in Germany. Over 100,000 specimens have been found at the locality. Like Tuchořice, it dates to the MN 3, specifically the older part of the zone. (Note: Böhme et al. (2012) dates it to ~18.5 Ma.) The assemblage was deposited during a period called the Eggenburgian Climatic Optimum (ECO, 20.4–18.2 Ma), a warm period that saw temperatures climb above 16 °C, and potentially up to 20 °C, in central Europe, following the late Oligocene cooling. This is evidenced by the presence of warmth-loving crocodylians, chameleons and snakes at Wintershof-West, including the boid Bavarioboa, cf. Falseryx, coral snakes, and a number of 'oriental' vipers. However, the absence of highly thermophilic taxa such as pythons and cobras suggests that the ECO was not quite as warm as the later Miocene Thermal Maximum (17.7–17.2 Ma) and Middle Miocene Climatic Optimum ( ~17–14.5 Ma), when the climate of modern Germany was paratropical. A study of the herpetofauna of Wintershof-West suggests a rather open and shrubby landscape with semi-arid climate, though alternating with dense shrubs and trees, which strongly contrasts with the swampy landscape of coeval Bohemia. As a result of low precipitation (estimated at 500–600 mm) and high temperatures, evaporation was likely high, although several semi-aquatic taxa (crocodylians, frogs, newts, and grass snakes) suggests the presence of at least small, temporary bodies of water, such as ponds. A study on the wider karst biome of the Jurassic limestone, in which Wintershof-West was located, also indicates a dry environment, with open water seasonally available. The herbivores suggests an open wooded habitat with zonal vegetation, and more mixed-feeders are found in the karstic highlands than in the lowland forests and wetlands of the Molasse Basin slightly to the south. Even so, 62% of the analyzed ruminants from the karstic community have been recovered as browsers, with 31% grass-dominated mixed feeders, and 8% browse-dominated mixed-feeders. The mammalian fauna of Wintershof-West is very diverse, with 85 reported taxa, with one of the richest Miocene carnivoran assemblages in the world, numbering thirty species. Among them are at least six species of amphicyonids; beyond the various Paludocyon, these include Ictiocyon socialis and Dehmicyon/Cynelos schlosseri, two of the smallest European members of the family, a very large taxon with affinities to Amphicyon giganteus, and a taxon described by Dehm as Amphicyon aff. crassidens, now of uncertain taxonomic status. Dehm (1950), followed by Kargopoulos (2022), also mention aff. Pseudocyon sansaniensis, though this taxon is not mentioned by Jiangzuo (2018). Other taxa include the bears Hemicyon and Ursavus, a large number of mustelids, the skunk-relative Miomemphitis, the hyena Plioviverrops gervais as well as the felid Styriofelis turnauensis, potentially alongside a smaller, Proailurus-like form. Herbivores include several taxa of ruminants; Andegameryx serus, the small deer Procervulus praelucidus, and the musk-deer Oriomeryx willii, Pomelomeryx boulangeri and Pomelomeryx wintershofensis; alongside the rabbit-sized Cainotherium and the first known European occurrence of the equid Anchitherium. Among the larger animals are the rhinoceros species Brachydiceratherium aurelianense, Mesaceratherium paulhiacense and Protaceratherium minutum, which were all recovered as mixed-feeders. Other animals found at this site include numerous rodents and insectivores, birds, albanerpetontids, turtles and amphibians.

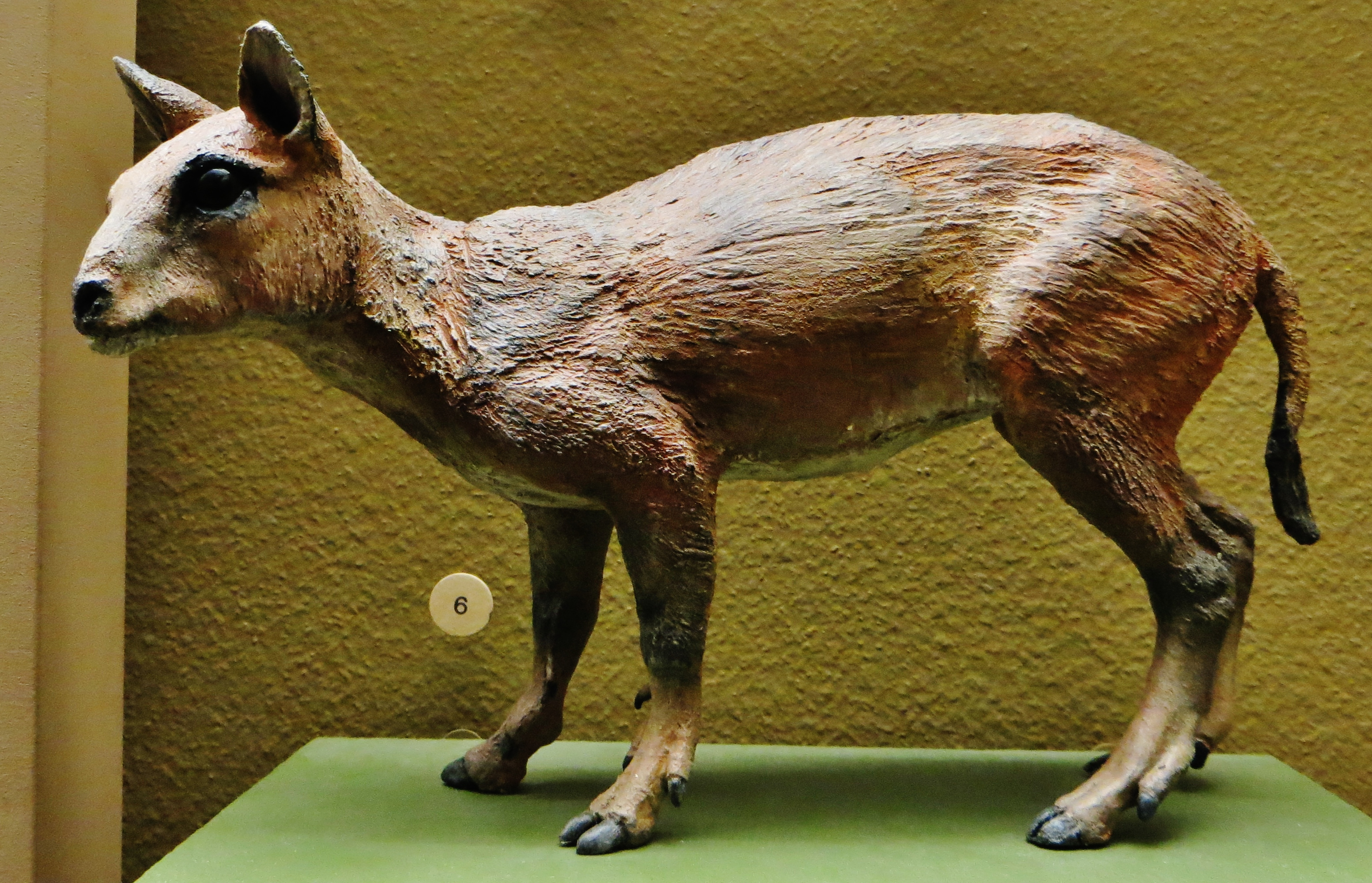
Model of Cainotherium, which coexisted with Paludocyon at a number of localities

The els Casot fossil site in Catalonia, where Paludocyon moyasolai was discovered, dates to the very beginning of the Middle Miocene, being 15.9 Ma old (early MN 5). This means that it was deposited during the Middle Miocene Climatic Optimum, which is reflected in the subtropical-to-tropical climate of the site, as evidenced by the presence of crocodylians (Diplocynodon ratelii), monitor lizards, giant tortoises (Titanochelon), boid snakes and pythons. Remains of amphibious and aquatic species and groups, such as anurans, crocodylians, freshwater molluscs, ostracods, the otter Paralutra, several artiodactyls feeding on aquatic vegetation, as well as charophytes and helophytes indicate a freshwater wetland, with seasonal rainfall. Specifically, the locality represents a lacustrine or palustrine environment, with shallow ponds and lakes that were subject to regular fluctations of the water table, with mesotrophic to eutrophic conditions and therefore limited oxygen. The large mammal fauna is dominated by browsers, suggesting that wooded areas dominated next to the wetlands. Meanwhile, the small mammal fauna indicate a drier, more open landscape. However, this can be explained by taphonomic bias - while the larger species were almost certainly autochthonous, the smaller mammals may have been brought to the site by birds of prey from farther afield. This agrees with palynological evidence from slightly younger localities within the Vallès-Penedès Basin and across Spain, that suggests the presence of riparian forests with strong tropical elements around wetlands, while open woodlands with arid influences (herbs and leguminous trees) dominated the rest of the landscape.

The carnivoran assemblage of els Casot is rich. Paludocyon coexisted with a second, much larger bear-dog (~150 kg) belonging to the genus Amphicyon, that it as of yet undescribed, though it has previously been referred to A. olisiponensis. Another large carnivoran present at the site is the dog-bear Hemicyon, while smaller taxa include the lynx-sized Styriofelis, Iberictis, the oldest member of the wolverine lineage, as well as various small mustelids, herpestids, and hyaenids. Small-to-medium-sized herbivores were also present, and were a likely source of prey for Paludocyon. These include the small equid Anchitherium, Cainotherium, the siderochoerid Choeromorus, the suoid Eurolistridon, the chevrotain 'Dorcatherium' crassum, the small bovid Eotragus, Lagomeryx, and the early deer Procervulus. Larger herbivores are represented by the horned Ampelomeryx ginsburgi, abundant rhinoceros remains, belonging to Dromoceratherium and an as of yet unidentified species, and the proboscideans Gompotherium and Prodeinotherium. Other animals include a number of rodents, notably glirids, insectivores, and various birds.
