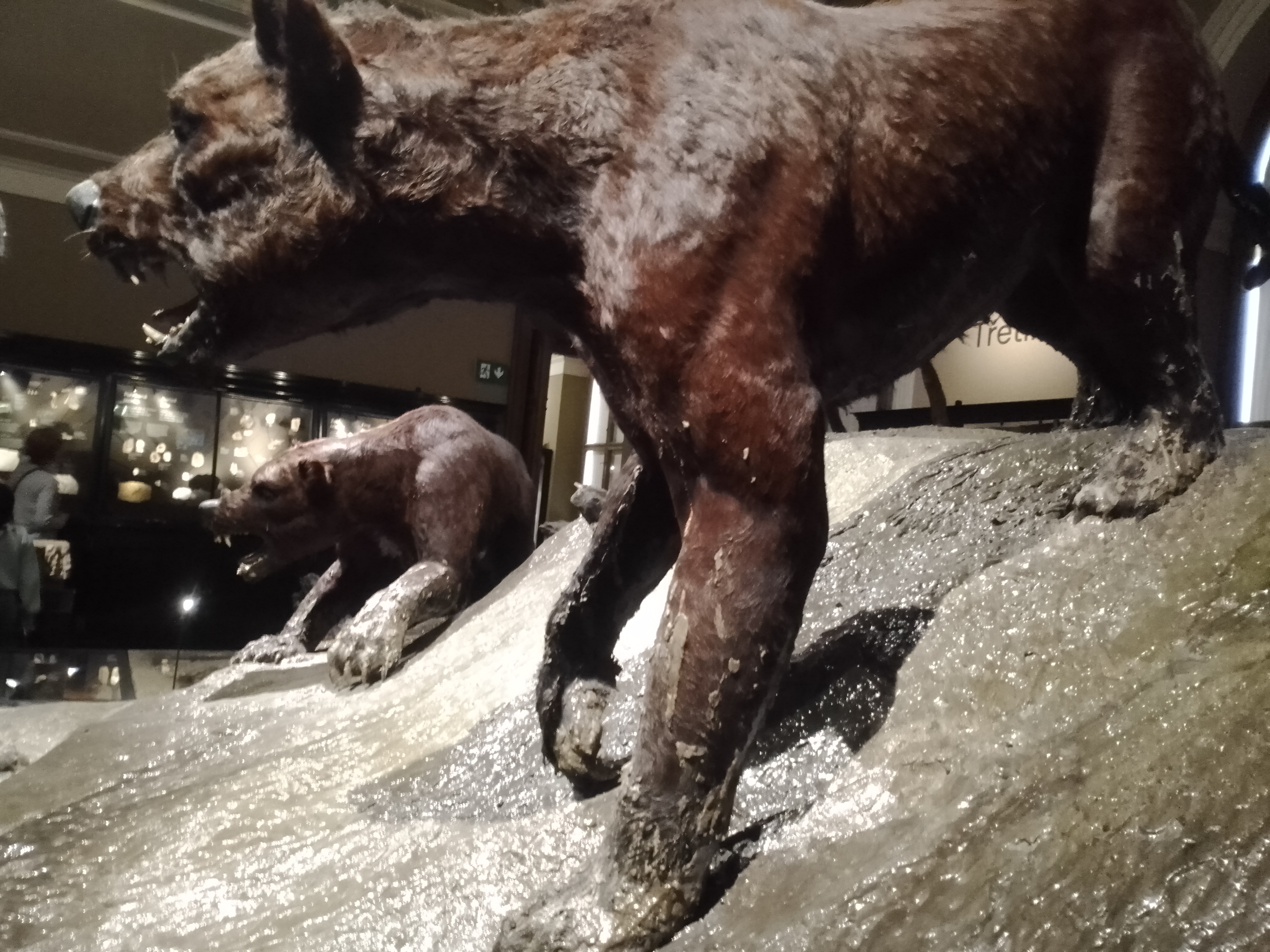
- Sculpture interpretation of Paludocyon bohemicus

Scientific classification
- Kingdom: Animalia
- Phylum: Chordata
- Class: Mammalia
- Order: Carnivora
- Family: †Amphicyonidae
- Subfamily: †Amphicyoninae; Trouessart (1885)

Genera
- †Brachycyon; †Cynodictis; †Goupilictis; †Pseudocyonopsis; Amphicyonini; †Afrocyon; †Amphicyon; †Bonisicyon; †Cynelos; †Heizmannocyon; †Ischyrocyon; †Janvierocyon; †Mogharacyon; †Myacyon; †Namibiocyon; †Paludocyon; †Pliocyon; †Tartarocyon; Askazansorini; †Askazansoria; Magericyonini; †Magericyon; †Pseudocyon; Pseudarctini; †Dehmicyon; †Ictiocyon; †Pseudarctos

= Amphicyoninae =

Amphicyonines Temporal range: Late Eocene — Late Miocene37.2–5.3 Ma

Extinct subfamily of carnivores

Amphicyoninae is a subfamily of extinct amphicyonids, large terrestrial carnivores sometimes called "bear-dogs", belonging to the suborder Caniformia, which inhabited North America, Eurasia, and Africa from the middle Eocene to the late Miocene.

Amphicyoninae was first named by Trouessart (1885). It was assigned to Canidae by Matthew (1902), to Ursidae by Ginsburg (1977) and to Amphicyonidae by Hunt (1998).

Genera include:

- Amphicyon, found in both Europe and N. America
- Cynelos, synonyms include Absonodaphoenus (from Florida) and Hecubides (from Africa), endemic to N. America
- Cynodictis
- Ischyrocyon (syn. Hadrocyon), endemic to N. America
- Goupilictis
- Magericyon
- Paludocyon
- Pliocyon, endemic to N. America
- Pseudocyon (syn. Amphicyonopsis), endemic to Europe and N. America

== Fossil distribution ==
Specimens have been recovered from:

- Midway Site, Gadsden County, Florida ~18.9—18.8 Ma.
- Rabbitt Creek Site, Meagher County, Montana ~21.7—18 Ma.
- Grimes Landing Site, King William County, Virginia ~17.6 Ma.
- Arrisdrift, Namibia ~23.03—11.6 Ma.
- Les Beilleaux, France ~20—16.9 Ma.
