= H. crucians =

H. crucians may refer to:

- Haplocyon crucians, an extinct mammal species
- Hyaenodon crucians, an extinct mammal species

== See also ==
- Crucians (disambiguation)
