= Askazansoria =

Askazansoria Temporal range: Burdigalian

Scientific classification
- Kingdom: Animalia
- Phylum: Chordata
- Class: Mammalia
- Infraclass: Placentalia
- Order: Carnivora
- Family: †Amphicyonidae
- Subfamily: †Amphicyoninae
- Genus: †Askazansoria; Kordikova, 2001

Type species
- †Askazansoria mavrini Kordikova, 2001

Extinct genus of carnivores

Askazansoria is an extinct genus of amphicyonids endemic to Asia, whose fossils have been discovered in early Miocene rocks from Kazakhstan. Despite only being known from fragmentary remains, the preserved remains differ enough from those of other members of its family enough that a separate, monotypic tribe, named Askazansoriini, has been erected for it.

== Taxonomy ==
Remains of this genus are so far only known from the Miocene sediments of the Askazansor Formation, which is located in the Betpak-Dala steppe of Kazakhstan. A variety of fossils have been recovered from this area since the 1920s, though the descriptions of these fossils tended to be short or limited to passing mentions in faunal lists. Among those were remains of a carnivorous mammal, which was variously regarded as either amphicyonid or belonging to Hyaenodon. In 1983, Kochenov & Khisarova assigned these remains to the genus Amphicyon. Later, Bonis et al. moved them to the genus Ysengrinia. Following this, Kordikova named Ysengrinia mavrini in 1998, though this ended up being a nomen nudum, before describing the new genus Askazansoria, with its type species A. mavrini, three years later. The holotype of this species is a fragment of an upper jaw, preserving the fourth premolar as well as the first two molars.

The genus name references the locality where it was found, the Askazansor salt lake, and the species name honors A. Mavrin, who discovered the fossil.

== Description ==
Askazansoria was a middle-sized amphicyonid. Its defining features are the shortening of its upper carnassial, a weakly developed protocone (the largest cusp on the molar), and short metastyle. Its first molar is elongated compared to the fourth premolar, while the second molar is reduced. The first two molars possess a V-shaped paracone (one of the major cusps) and lingulal cingulum. It differs from Ysengrinia by the strong shortening and widening of its molars.

Location of the Askazansor Salt Lake

== Paleoecology ==
The fauna of the upper Askazansor Formation suggests that it dates to the Early Miocene, roughly concurrent with the Late Agenian or Early Orlenian (MN Zones 2-3) of Europe. At this time, the site was located close to the coast of the Paratethys, the retreat of which left behind a number of lakes and rivers. The dominant vegetation were floodplain forests, with an abundance of low trees and shrubs. Askazansoria coexisted with a variety of ungulates, including several species of rhinoceros (Diaceratherium, Protaceratherium, Mesaceratherium, and a member of the tribe Teleoceratini), three undescribed deer-relatives, and the anthracothere Brachyodus. The most common mammal was the chalicothere Borissakia.
