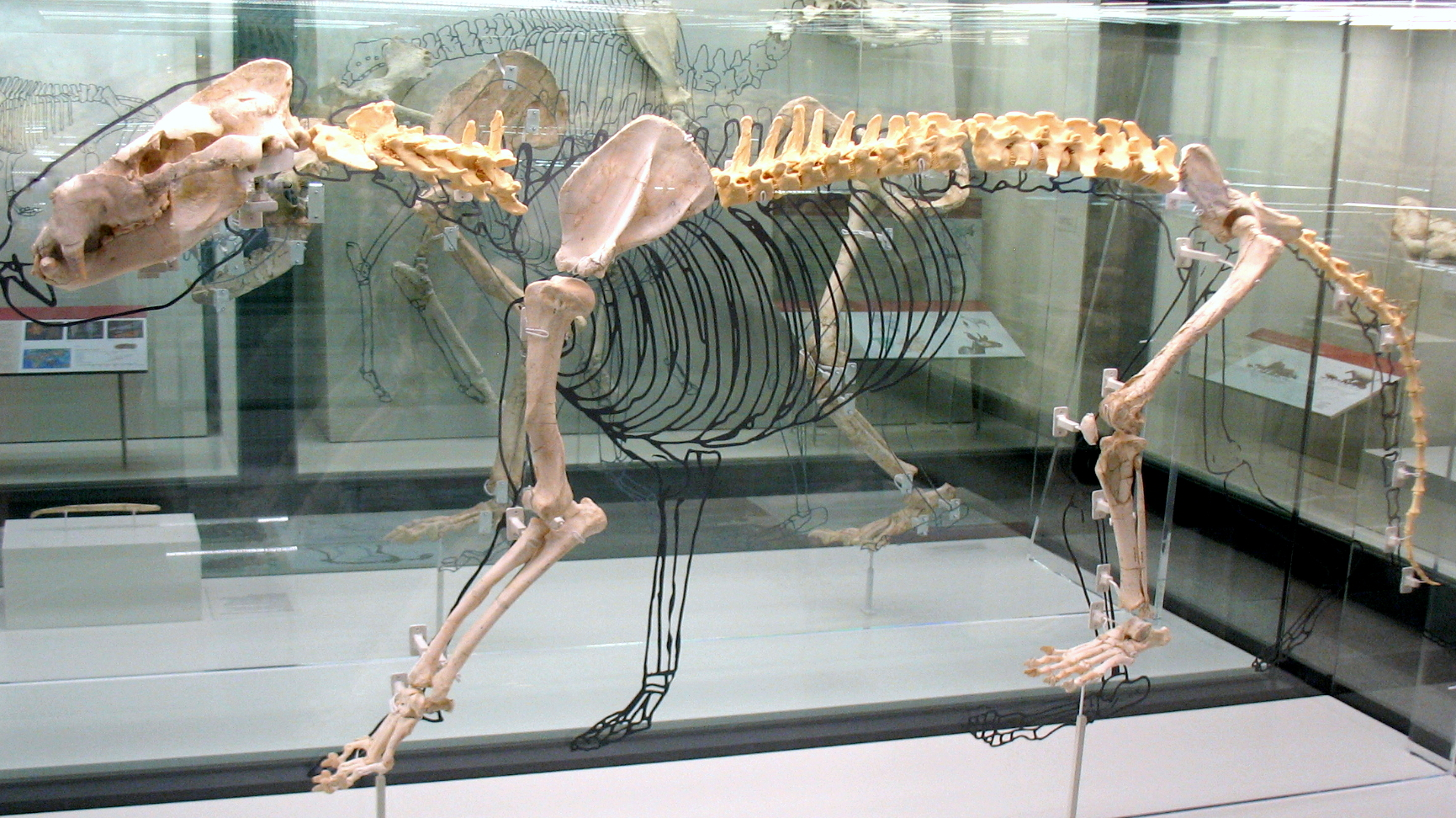
- Magericyon anceps

Scientific classification
- Kingdom: Animalia
- Phylum: Chordata
- Class: Mammalia
- Infraclass: Placentalia
- Order: Carnivora
- Family: †Amphicyonidae
- Subfamily: †Amphicyoninae
- Genus: †Magericyon; Peigne, Salesa, Anton, Morales, 2008

Type species
- Magericyon anceps Peigne, Salesa, Anton, Morales, 2008

Species
- †M. anceps Peigne, Salesa, Anton, Morales, 2008; †M. castellanus (Ginsburg, Morales, Soria, 1981)

= Magericyon =

Magericyon Temporal range: Late Miocene 10–9 Ma

Extinct genus of carnivores

Magericyon is an extinct genus of amphicyonid ("bear-dog") that lived during the Miocene 10-9 Ma (Vallesian Age) in what is now Spain.

== Classification ==
Magericyon was described for the first time in 2008, based on fossils found in Cerro de los Batallones in Spain. The type species is Magericyon anceps, but a second species has also been attributed to the genus as M. castellanus, described in 1981 and initially attributed to the genus Amphicyon. Magericyon is part of the family Amphicyonidae, a group of very common carnivores ranging from the Eocene to the Miocene, and which occupied many different ecological niches. Magericyon is the last amphicyonid known from Western Europe. Evidence also indicates that Magericyon was closely related to Amphicyon.

== Description ==
The body of this animal was vaguely similar to that of a particularly robust, large felid, but the skull resembles that of a canid or an ursid, like that of many amphicyonids. Unlike most other amphicyonids, Magericyon had teeth associated with those of a hypercarnivore, with laterally flattened canines, the third premolar having a single root, the absence of second premolars, and a metaconid on its lower molars with a reduction in the second upper molar. The scapula and the front leg showed primitive features such as an acromion in the shoulder with a reduced caudoventral projection and post scapular pit. Magericyon was one of the largest predators in its environment, weighing around 172–205 kg (379–452 lb).

== Paleobiology ==
=== Palaeoecology ===
Magericyon occupied a different ecological niche than other amphicyonids, such as the larger Amphicyon and Ysengrinia (which had lifestyles more akin to bears) or Daphoenodon and Temnocyon of North America, which were more capable runners. Magericyon probably lived in a similar manner to that of modern felines, being an ambush hunter of large prey. Studies by Gemo Siliceo et al also revealed that Magericyon had powerful jaw and neck muscles that helped to stabilize its head and jaws during a bite. Magericyon was particularly adept at side-to-side movements and rotations of the head. This feature allowed Magericyon to swiftly and efficiently process the meat on a carcass, allowing the animal to consume sufficient amounts of flesh before scavengers could take over its kill.

Biomechanical analysis of the skull indicates that, despite its massive size, Magericyon had a relatively weak absolute bite force similar to a wolf. Magericyon probably did not consume much bone, and its blade-like teeth were poorly suited to any crushing action. The mandible was fairly resistant to stresses related to sideways and pull-back movement, though to a lesser degree than lions or hyenas. It may have relied on its powerful forelimbs and neck muscles to incapacitate large prey, with a kill requiring multiple bites rather than a single killing bite (as used by cats). Alternatively, it may have preferred to ambush smaller prey which were more vulnerable to its bite force.

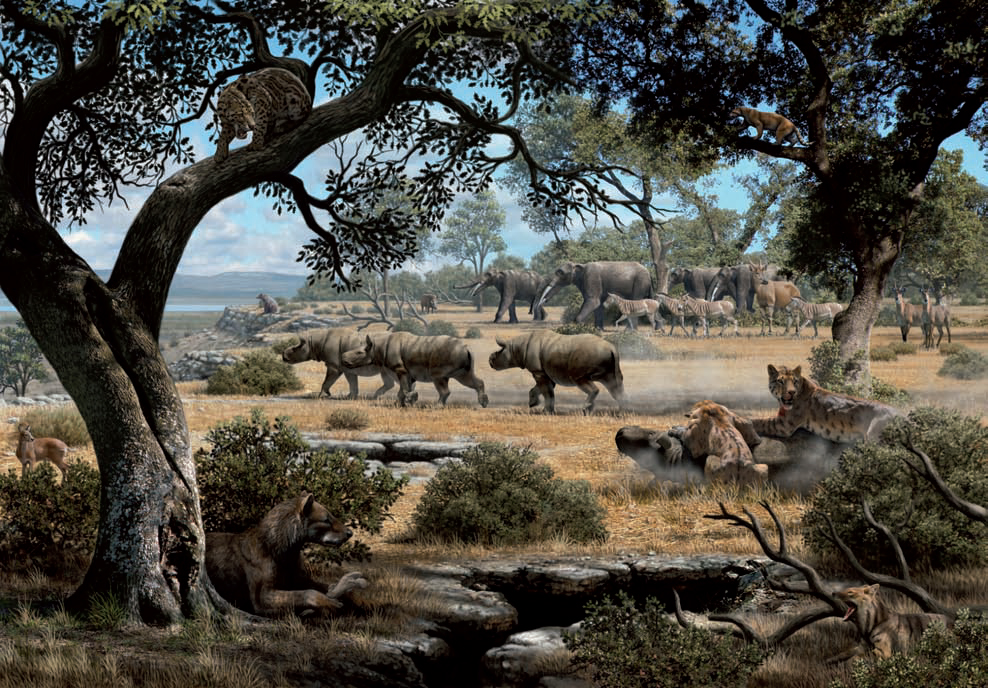
Vallesian environment and fauna of Cerro de los Batallones including M. anceps (on the ground), by Mauricio Antón

As a carnivore at Cerro de los Battalones, Magericyon shared the apex predator position with two saber-toothed cat species, the leopard-sized Promegantereon ogygia and the tiger-sized Machairodus aphanistus. Evidence indicates that the large carnivores may have co-existed using niche partitioning. A δ^{13}C bone analysis matched isotope profiles in prey species with their predators, showing both cats hunted prey that typically live in closed woodland habitats, such as pigs of the genus Microstonyx and perhaps occasionally young of the "tetralophodont gomphothere" Tetralophodon. Magericyon ate medium-sized prey that live in more open habitats, with the antelope Austroportax being an important food source and hipparionine horses also present in the diet. Taphonomic evidence suggests moschids were on the menu of M. anceps as well. Because the site attracted all three species as a predator trap, Magericyon may also have taken carrion or injured animals of various kinds, though its teeth show it was specialized as a hypercarnivore without the bone-cracking adaptations of many other bear-dogs.

Magericyon may have competed at times with large omnivorous bears such as Agriotherium and Indarctos, but these genera fed more on plant material. As well as Austroportax and Hippotherium, its prey could have included young of the hornless rhinoceros Aceratherium and possibly the calves of the large sivatherine giraffes and boselaphine antelopes. Since its choice of prey suggests it lived in open country, while its legs conversely were not designed for speed, Magericyon probably would have engaged in kleptoparasitism against any of the smaller carnivores in the region or in scavenging when the opportunity presented itself.
