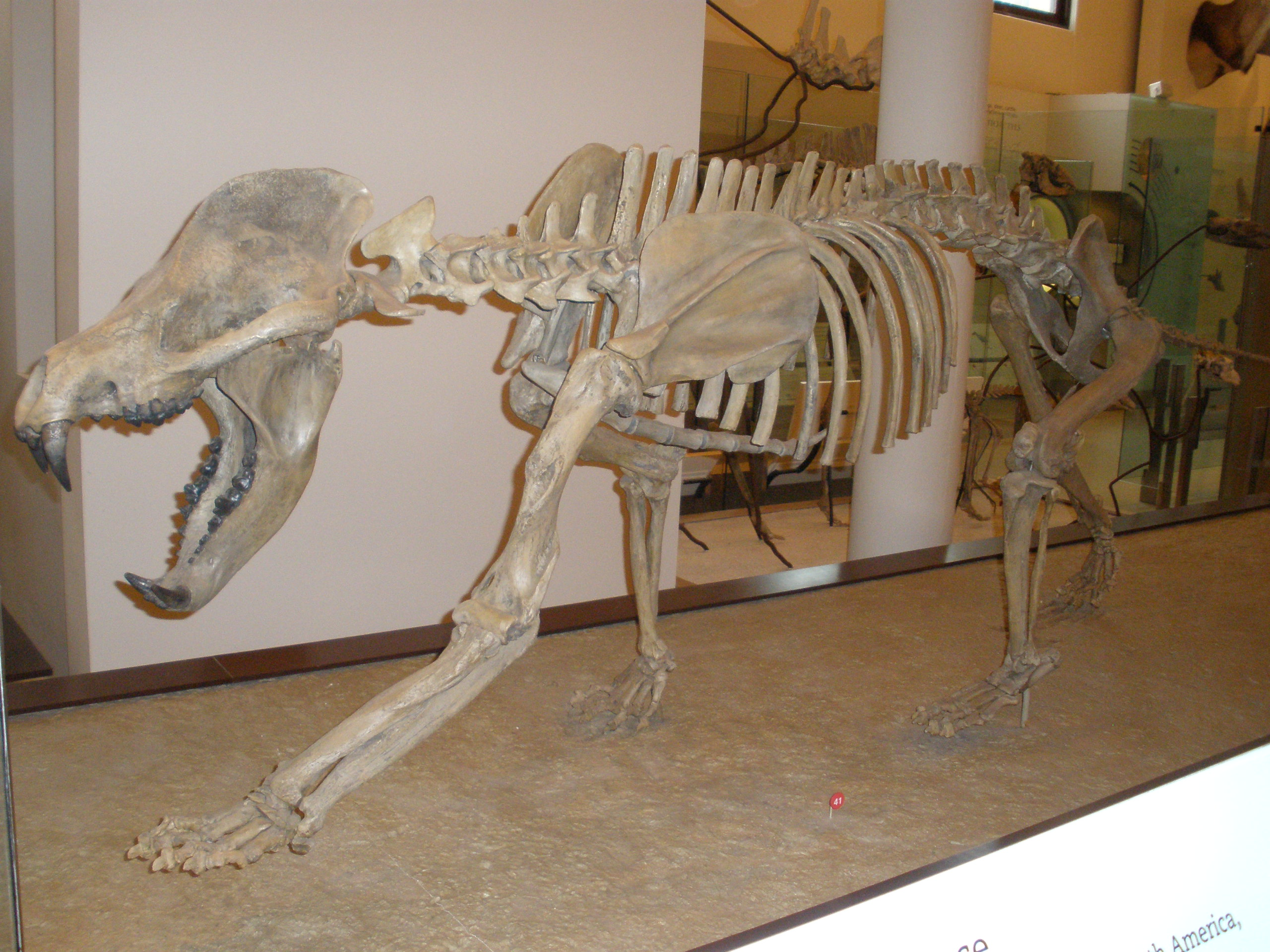
- Skeleton of Amphicyon

Scientific classification
- Kingdom: Animalia
- Phylum: Chordata
- Class: Mammalia
- Order: Carnivora
- Suborder: Caniformia
- Superfamily: †Amphicyonoidea
- Family: †Amphicyonidae; Haeckel, 1866

Subfamilies
- †Amphicyoninae †Daphoeninae †Haplocyoninae †Temnocyoninae †Thaumastocyoninae

= Amphicyonidae =

Amphicyonids Temporal range: Middle Eocene – Late Miocene 42–5.3 Ma

Extinct family of carnivores

Amphicyonidae, also known as "bear-dogs", is an extinct family of terrestrial carnivorans belonging to the suborder Caniformia. They first appeared in North America in the middle Eocene (around 42 Ma), spread to Europe by the late Eocene (35 Ma), and further spread to Asia and Africa by the early Miocene (23 Ma). Amphicyonids were among the first lineages of carnivorans to reach large body sizes. The family had largely disappeared worldwide by the late Miocene (9-7 Ma), with the latest recorded species at the end of the Miocene in Africa. The extinction of the family was thought to have been due to competition with other carnivoran families such as ursids, hyaenids, and canids.

== Taxonomy ==
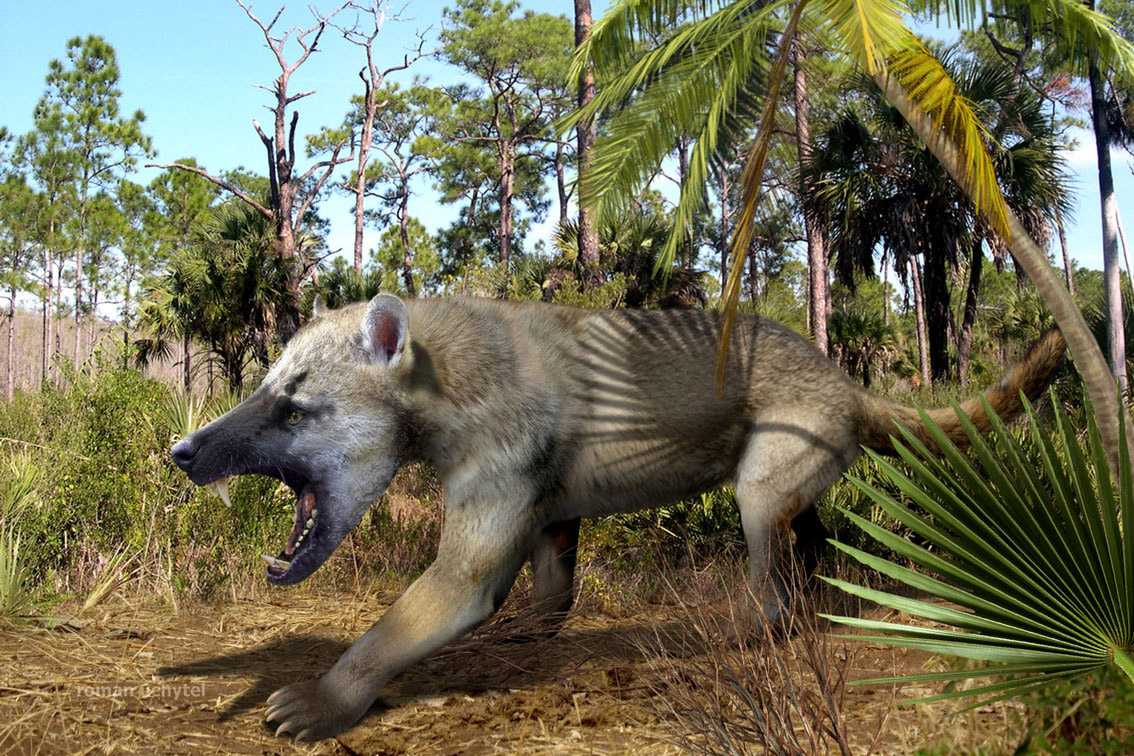
Restoration of Amphicyon ingens

The family was erected by Haeckel in 1866 (also attributed to Trouessart 1885). Their exact position has long been disputed. Early paleontologists usually defined them as members of Canidae (the dog family) or Ursidae (the bear family), but the modern consensus is that they form their own family. Some researchers have defined it as the sister clade to ursids, based on morphological analysis of the ear region. However, cladistic analysis and reclassification of several species of early carnivore as amphicyonids has strongly suggested that they may be basal caniforms, a lineage older than the origin of both bears and dogs.

Amphicyonids should not be confused with the similar looking (and similarly nicknamed) "dog-bears", a more derived group of caniforms that is sometimes classified as a family (Hemicyonidae), but is more often considered a primitive subfamily of ursids (Hemicyoninae). They should also not be confused with Amphicynodontidae (another family of extinct caniforms, which were related to bears or pinnipeds) or Arctocyonidae (a family of "condylarths", which literally translates to "bear-dogs").

== Description ==
Amphicyonids ranged in size from as small as 5 kg (11 lb) and as large as 100 to 773 kg (220 to 1,704 lb) and evolved from wolf-like to bear-like body forms.

=== Skull ===
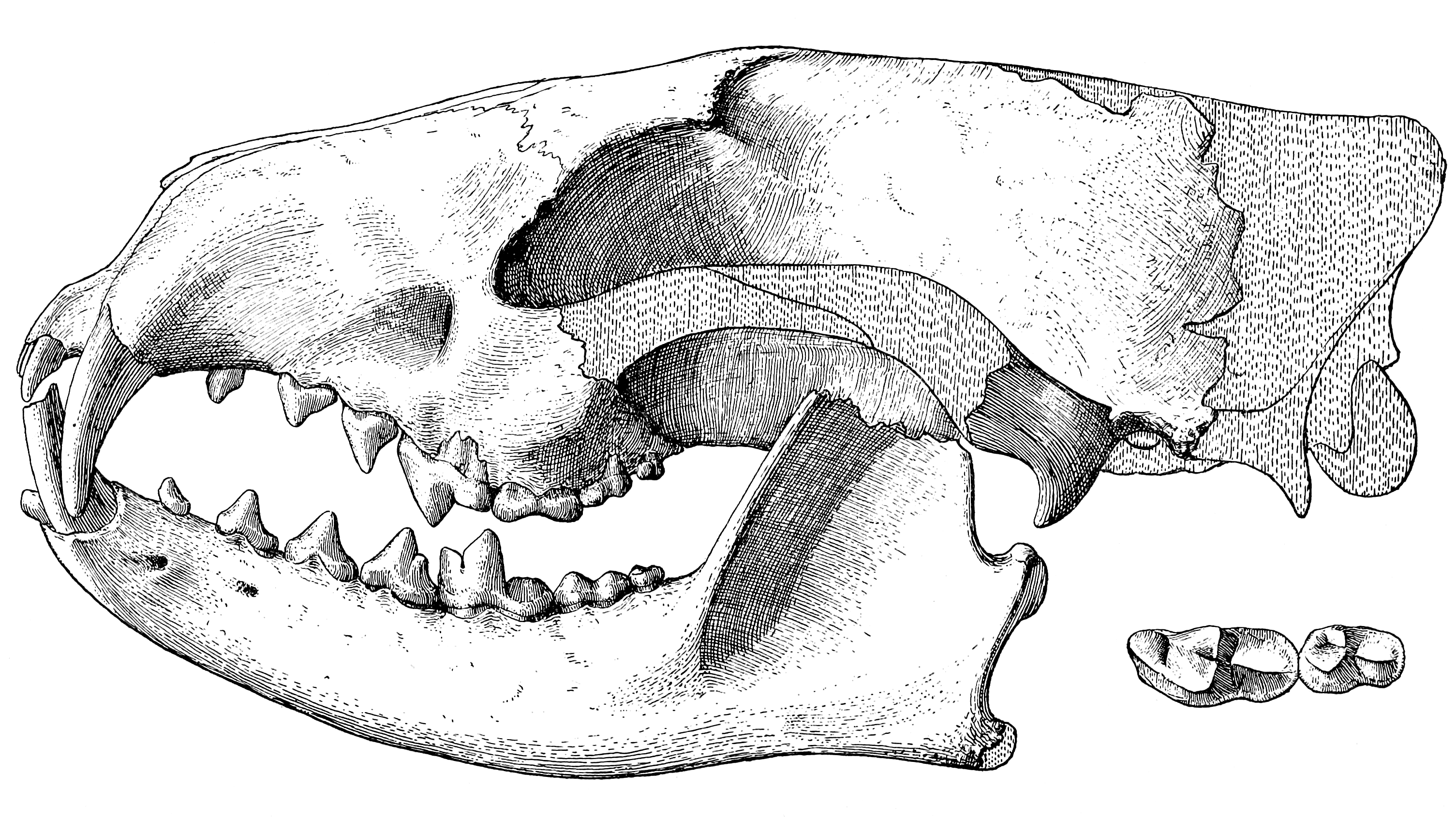
Skull diagram of Daphoenus vetus

Amphicyonids tended to have relatively large skulls, with the snout shorter than the rear portion of the cranium. In some large members of the family, such as Amphicyon, the back of the skull develops a sharp sagittal crest which defines attachment points for large jaw muscles.

Amphicyonids had a relatively rudimentary form of auditory bulla, a bony sheath which encases the middle ear cavity. The bulla is small, mostly formed by the crescent-shaped ectotympanic bone below the middle ear. The entotympanics only make a minor contribution whenever they are ossified, which only becomes commonplace in Miocene amphicyonids. In these regards, amphicyonids are similar to living bears, otters, walruses, eared seals, and the red panda. The bulla also helps to distinguish the evolutionary trajectory of amphicyonids: early bears such as Cephalogale have large bullae, which are reduced through the course of their evolution, while dogs start out with large bullae that persist through their entire existence. Amphicyonids differ from both dogs and bears in that they start with a small bulla, which gradually becomes more strongly developed later in their evolution.

=== Teeth ===
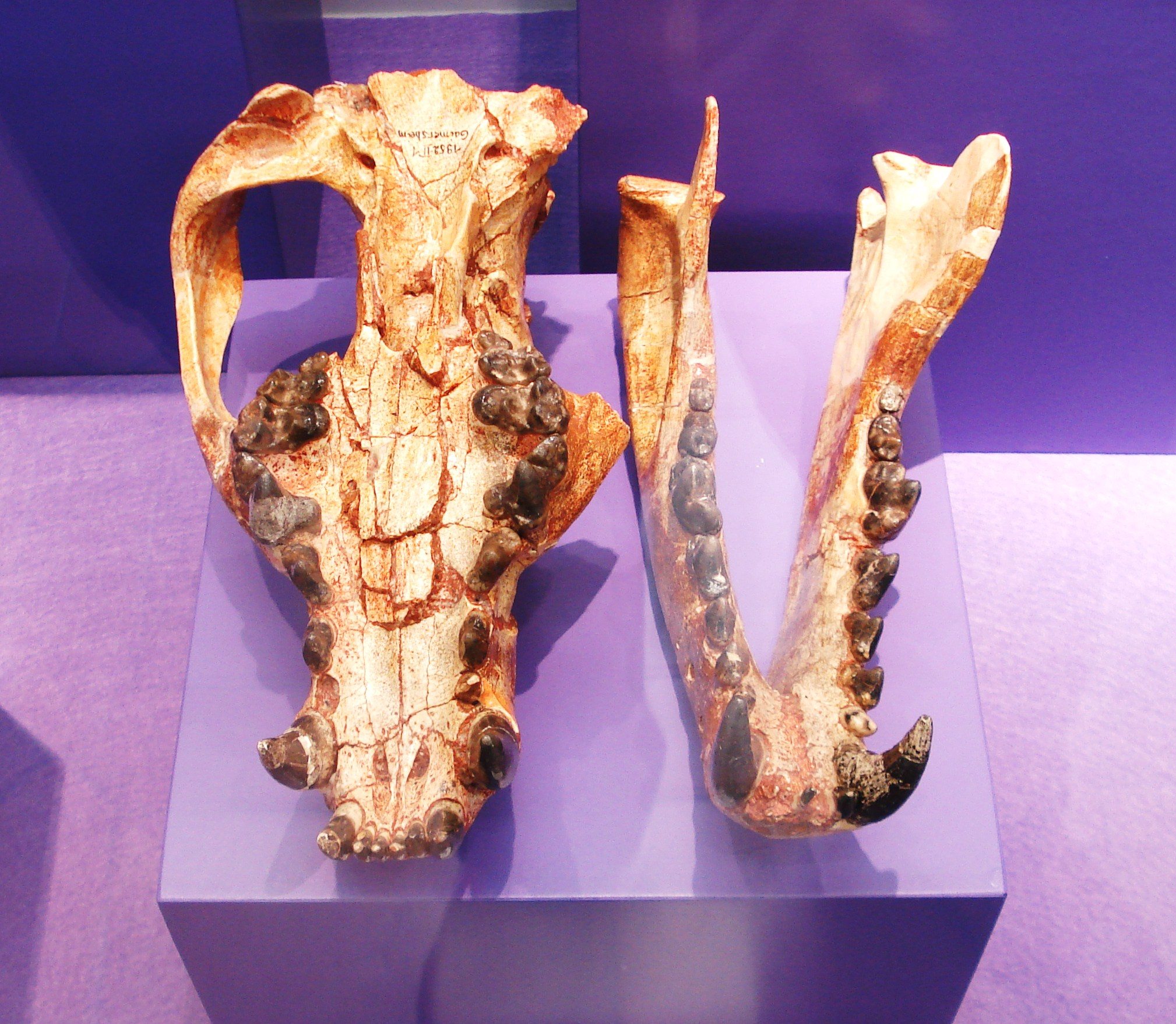
Cranium and mandible of Amphicyon, Paläontologisches Museum München

Like most carnivorans, amphicyonid teeth were adapted for carnivory, with large canines near the front and shearing carnassials at the back of the jaw. Amphicyonids were typically mesocarnivorous (majority meat-eating, like dogs) or hypercarnivorous (entirely meat-eating, like cats), and some were adapted for tough abrasive food. Only two small Miocene amphicyonines, Pseudarctos and Ictiocyon, show any evidence for a hypocarnivorous (majority plant-eating) diet.

At the start of their evolution, amphicyonids retained the typical placental dental formula of 3.1.4.33.1.4.3, but each subfamily follows their own trend in modifying their teeth. Daphoenines, for example, have dog-like teeth, with substantial premolars and reduced second and third molars. Temnocyonines and haplocyonines take this approach even further, with massive crushing premolars akin to hyenas. Amphicyonines follow the opposite path, reducing most premolars and greatly enlarging and strengthening the carnassials and second molar. Bears also have large molars, but their teeth are modified into wide rectangular forms for grinding plant material. Amphicyonids did not pursue the same adaptations; their upper molars always maintain a roughly triangular profile for shearing and crushing meat. Thaumastocyonines were the most specialized for hypercarnivory, emphasizing massive blade-like carnassials at the expense of the rest of their postcanine teeth.

Fossils of juvenile Agnotherium, Ischyrocyon, and Magericyon all show an unusual type of tooth eruption in which there is a vulnerable stage at about two or three years of age where the subadult animal has no functional molar or carnassial teeth, the only functional cheek teeth being several milk premolars. This period is suggested to be short and would have left the animal somewhat vulnerable.

=== Postcrania ===
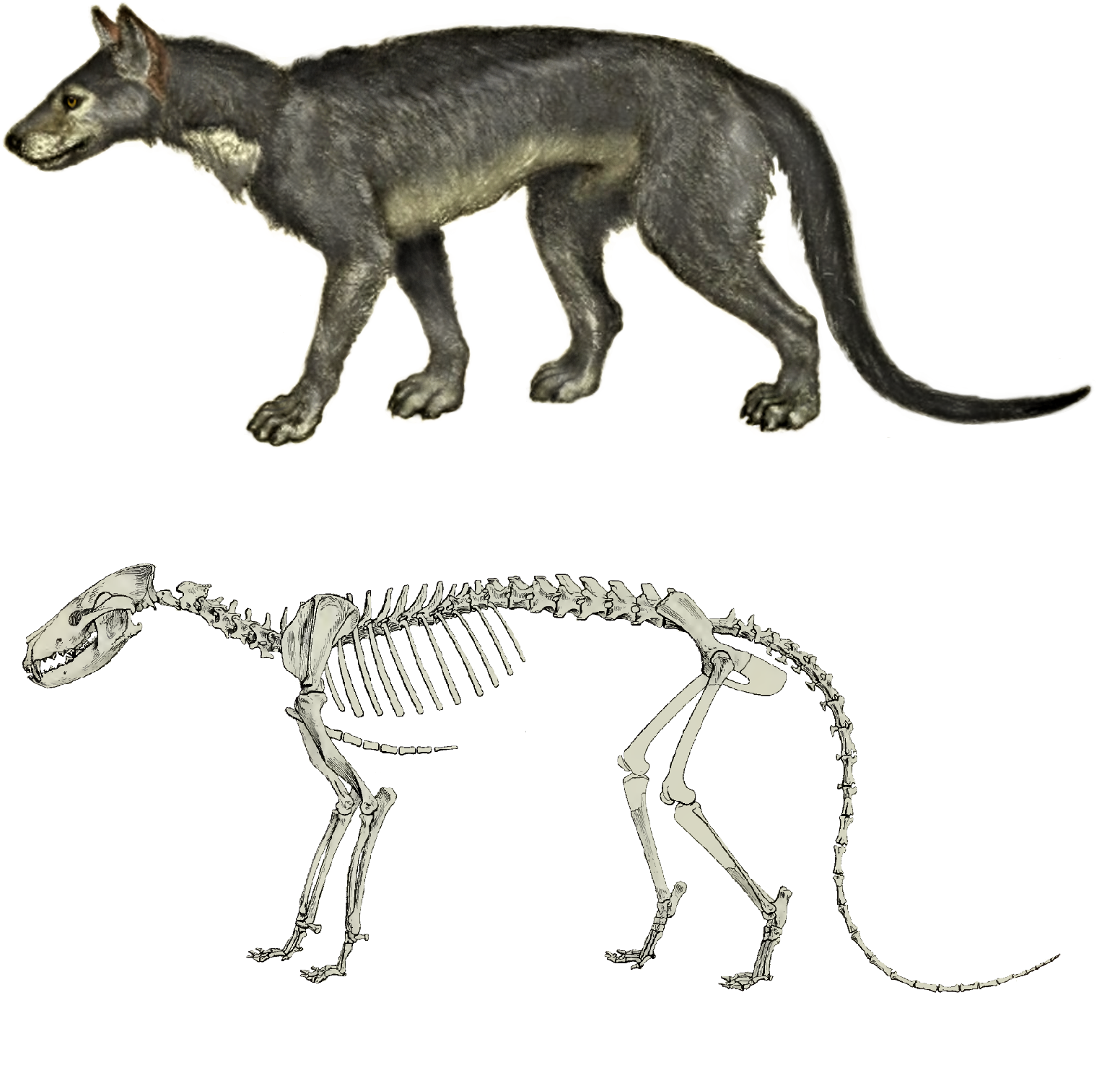
Life restoration and skeletal diagram of Daphoenodon superbus

Many amphicyonids had cat-like bodies, with a long tail and relatively short, strong limbs suitable for stalking and pouncing on their prey. Later and larger species tended to be plantigrade or semiplantigrade, walking with most or all of the surface of the foot against the ground like bears. This was the norm for amphicyonines, thaumastocyonines, and most daphoenines. It is entirely possible that the largest amphicyonids were capable of both bear-style hunting (chasing down and mauling their prey with teeth and claws) and cat-style hunting (a quick ambush where the prey is killed with a bite to the neck).

Many amphicyonid lineages instead adopted a digitigrade posture and locomotion (walking on their toes) and long legs specialized for running with a primarily front-to-back arc of movement. These cursorial wolf- or hyena-like forms included temnocyonines, haplocyonines, and some species of the large daphoenine Daphoenodon.

== Evolution ==
It has long been uncertain where amphicyonids originated. It was thought that they may have crossed from Europe to North America during the Miocene epoch, but recent research suggests a possible North American origin from the miacids Miacis cognitus and M. australis (now renamed as the genera Gustafsonia and Angelarctocyon, respectively). As these are of North American origin, but appear to be early amphicyonids, it may be that the Amphicyonidae actually originates in North America. New World amphicyonids include the oldest known amphicyonid, Daphoenus (40–27 Ma). During the Arikareean in North America, amphicyonids had a competitive advantage over nimravids as the Oligocene progressed due to their greater cursoriality compared to the latter, helping them to persist as the latter disappeared from the continent as terrestrial habitats became more open.

=== Extinction ===
Amphicyonids began to decline in the late Miocene, with amphicyonids going extinct in North America and Eurasia around 9 and 7 Ma, respectively. The most recent securely dated amphicyonid remains belong to the genus Bonisicyon from the latest Miocene (6.5–5.3 Ma) of Lothagam. The extinction of amphicyonids have been hypothesized by experts.

Viranti (1996) goes over potential hypothesizes to the decline and extinction of European amphicyonids. First, they discussed the possibility that the extinction of amphicyonids in Europe was the result of environmental changes. Secondly, they discuss on how much the decline of prey coincides with the extinction of the amphicyonids. They found evidence that the extinction of amphicyonids in Western Europe was contemporary with climatic changes and the reduction of forests.

Viranti (1996) also found no evidence of hypercarnivorous amphicyonid diversity being directly connected perissodactyls evolution, as perissodactyls increased in diversity after the extinction of the hypercarnivorous anphicyonids. Lastly, they discussed the possibility of the extinction of actively hunting amphicyonids with bone crushing capabilities was the result of competing with hyenas (including percrocutines), machairodonts, large mustelids, and ursids. They argued while the majority of amphicyonids went extinct prior to the appearance of the hyaenine Adcrocuta, the last amphicyonid species may have been outcompeted by Adcrocuta. They also suggested that machairodonts were likely competitors to hypercarnivorous amphicyonids. On the other hand, amphicyonids may not have competed with percrocutines and mustelids due to their rarity and/or absence MN9 localities. With ursids being able to co-occur with amphicyonids without outcompeting them.

Valkenburgh (1999) hypothesized that the decline and extinction of amphicyonids may have been due to the arrival of agriotherini bears and were replaced by taxa more specialized in carnivory (e.g. felids and hyenas) and omnivory (bears). Werdelin and Simpson (2009) suggested the extinction of Bonisicyon may have been the result of the inability to compete with Eucyon.

== Ecology ==
Amphicyonids are suggested to have ranged in ecology from omnivores to hypercarnivores, with some amphicyonids suggested to have engaged in bone-crushing like some modern hyenas. It was thought that many amphicyonids are suggested to have been solitary hunters. However, in the case of Daphoenodon, five adults and one juvenile were found in three adjacent burrows, suggesting this species were gregarious predators.

== Classification ==
Family Amphicyonidae

Not assigned to a subfamily	Subfamily Amphicyoninae	Subfamily Haplocyoninae (Eurasia)	Subfamily Daphoeninae (North America)	Subfamily Temnocyoninae (North America)	Subfamily Thaumastocyoninae
Amphicyanis; Angelarctocyon; A. australis (formerly Miacis australis); Brachycyon; B. reyi; B. palaeolycos; B. gaudryi; Gustafsonia; G. cognita (formerly Miacis cognitus); Guangxicyon; G. sinoamericanus; Harpagocyon; H. inusitatus; Harpagophagus; Meiniogale; M. getti; Sarcocyon (Possible affinities with the Haplocyoninae); S. ferox; Storchictis; S. miacinus; Symplectocyon; S. praecursor; Vishnucyon; V. chinjiensis	Afrocyon; A. burolleti; Amphicyon; A. astrei; A. carnutense?; A. cooperi; A. frendens; A. galushai; A. giganteus?; A. gutmanni; A. ingens; A. lactorensis; A. laugnacensis; A. longiramus; A. lyddekeri?; A. major (type); A. palaeindicus?; A. pannonicus; A. shahbazi; A. ulungurensis; A. zhanxiangi; Askazansoria; A. mavrini; Bonisicyon; B. illacabo; Cynelos; C. caroniavorus; C. crassidens; C. helbingo; C. idoneus; C. jitu; C. jourdan; C. lemanensis; C. macrodon; C. minor; C. pivetaui; C. rugosidens; C. schlosseri; C. sinapius; Cynodictis; C. cayluxensis; "C. compressidens"; C. crassus; C. exilis; C. ferox; C. intermedius; C. lacustris; C. longirostris; "C. palmidens"; C. peignei; Dehmicyon; D. schlosseri; Goupilictis; G. minor; Hecubides; H. euryodon; Ictiocyon; I. socialis; Ischyrocyon; I. gidleyi; Janvierocyon; J. pontignensis; Maemohcyon; M. potisati; Magericyon; M. anceps; M. castellanus; Myacyon; M. dojambir; M. kiptalami; M. peignei; Mogharacyon; M. anubisi; Namibiocyon; N. ginsburgi; Paludocyon; P. bohemicus; Pliocyon; P. medius; P. ossifragus; P. robustus; Pseudocyon; P. sansaniensis; P. steinheimensis?; P. styriacus; Pseudarctos; P. bavaricus; Pseudocyonopsis; P. ambiguus; P. antiquus; P. landesquei; P. quercensis; Tartarocyon; T. cazanavei	Aktaucyon; A. brachifacialis; Gobicyon; G. acutus; G. macrognathus; G. serbiae; G. yei; G. zhegalloi; Haplocyon; H. elegans; H. dombrowskii; H. crucians; Haplocyonoides; H. mordax; H. serbiae; H. ponticus; Haplocyonopsis; H. crassidens	Adilophontes; A. brachykolos; Brachyrhynchocyon; B. dodgei; B. intermedius; B. montanus; Daphoenictis; D. tedfordi; Daphoenodon; D. falkenbachi; D. notionastes; D. robustum; D. periculosus; D. skinneri; D. superbus; Daphoenus; D. felinus; D. hartshornianus; D. lambei; D. nebrascensis; D. socialis; D. transversus; D. vetus; Paradaphoenus; P. cuspigerus; P. minimus; P. tooheyi	Delotrochanter; D. major; D. oryktes; D. petersoni; Mammacyon; M. ferocior; M. obtusidens; Rudiocyon; R. amplidens; Temnocyon; T. altigenis; T. ferox; T. fingeruti; T. macrogenys; T. percussor; T. subferox	Agnotherium; A. antiquus; Ammitocyon; A. kainos; Crassidia; C. intermedia; Peignecyon; P. felinoides; Thaumastocyon; T. bourgeoisi; T. dirus; Tomocyon; T. grivense; Ysengrinia; Y. americanus; Y. depereti; Y. geraniana; Y. tolosana; Y. valentiana
