= Harpagophagus =

Harpagophagus Temporal range: Oligocene

Scientific classification
- Kingdom: Animalia
- Phylum: Chordata
- Class: Mammalia
- Infraclass: Placentalia
- Order: Carnivora
- Suborder: Caniformia
- Superfamily: †Amphicyonoidea
- Family: †Amphicyonidae
- Genus: †Harpagophagus; De Bonis (1971)

Extinct genus of carnivores

Harpagophagus is an extinct genus of large, mostly carnivorous bone-crushing mammals of the family Amphicyonidae endemic to Europe during the Oligocene living from 33.9 to 23.03 Ma and existed for approximately 10.87 million years.

== Taxonomy ==
Harpagophagus was named by De Bonis (1971). It is not extant. Its type is Harpagophagus sanguinensis. It was assigned to Amphicyonidae by De Bonis (1971) and Carroll (1988).
