= Pliocyon =

Pliocyon Temporal range: 20.6–13.6 Ma Early Miocene-Middle Miocene

Scientific classification
- Kingdom: Animalia
- Phylum: Chordata
- Class: Mammalia
- Order: Carnivora
- Family: †Amphicyonidae
- Subfamily: †Amphicyoninae
- Genus: †Pliocyon; Matthew, 1918

Type species
- †Pliocyon medius

Species
- P. medius Matthew 1918; P. ossifragus Douglass 1903; P. robustus Berta & Galiano 1984

Extinct genus of carnivores

Pliocyon is an extinct genus of amphicyonids which inhabited North America during the Middle Miocene 16.0—13.6 Ma, existing for approximately 2 million years. Fossils have been uncovered in South Florida, Oregon, and western Nebraska.
