= Haplocyonopsis =

Haplocyonopsis Temporal range: Miocene

Scientific classification
- Domain: Eukaryota
- Kingdom: Animalia
- Phylum: Chordata
- Class: Mammalia
- Order: Carnivora
- Family: †Amphicyonidae
- Genus: †Haplocyonopsis de Bonis (1973)

Species
- †H. crassidens

Extinct genus of carnivores

Haplocyonopsis is an extinct genus of terrestrial carnivores belonging to the suborder Caniformia, family Amphicyonidae ("bear dog").

Lived in Miocene epoch in Europe.

Haplocyonopsis was named by de Bonis (1973) and was assigned to Amphicyonidae by Carroll (1988).

== Sources ==
- Haplocyonopsis - Position in a system | BioLib.cz
- European Neogene Mammal Chronology
- Global Names Index
