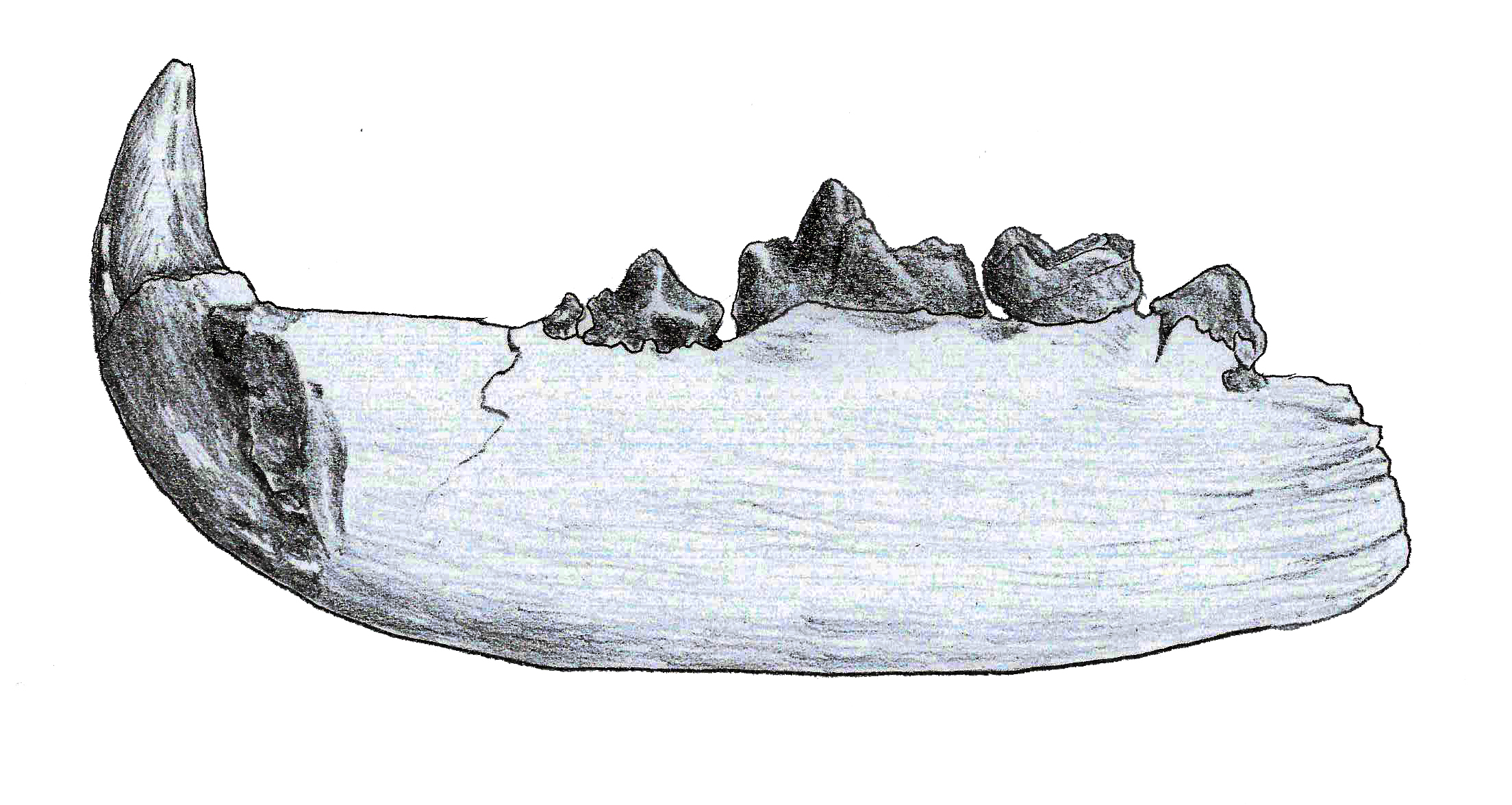
- Pseudocyon sansaniensis

Scientific classification
- Kingdom: Animalia
- Phylum: Chordata
- Class: Mammalia
- Order: Carnivora
- Family: †Amphicyonidae
- Subfamily: †Amphicyoninae
- Genus: †Pseudocyon; Lartet, 1851

Species
- †P. sansaniensis; †P. steinheimensis; †P. styriacus

Synonyms
- Amphicyonopsis

= Pseudocyon =

Pseudocyon Temporal range: Early Miocene to Late Miocene, (Burdigalian to Tortonian) 17.2–9 Ma

Extinct genus of carnivores

Pseudocyon (False dog) is a genus of amphicyonid which inhabited Eurasia and North America during the Miocene epoch from 17.2 to 9 Ma. Pseudocyon was assigned to Amphicyoninae by Hunt in 1988. The genus was one of the largest amphicyonids with the North American Pseudocyon possibly weighing 773 kg (1,704 lb).

Originally evolving in Europe, Pseudocyon dispersed into North America roughly 15.5 Ma, replacing Amphicyon ingens.

== Description ==
Body mass estimates based on humerus remains estimate P. sansaniensis weighed 245 kg (540 lb), The largest fossil find was of a mandible (F:AM 49247) founded in New Mexico. The mass estimate derived from the mandible was about 773 kg (1,704 lb), representing a very large individual of Pseudocyon.

== Paleobiology ==
Dental microwear of Sansan amphicyonids by Goillot (2009) found P. sansaniensis had an omnivorous diet similar to that of European badgers, with plants and other hard items making a significant part of its diet. Compared to the European species, North American Pseudocyon was noted to have dental and cranial similarities to Ischyrocyon, suggesting it was hypercarnivorous.

== Fossil distribution ==
Specimens were located in Belomechetskaia Russian Federation, Santa Cruz, New Mexico, Pontigne and Malartic, a la ferme Larrieu, France, and Nebraska.
