= Amphicyanis =

Scientific classification
- Domain: Eukaryota
- Kingdom: Animalia
- Phylum: Chordata
- Class: Mammalia
- Order: Carnivora
- Suborder: Caniformia
- Superfamily: †Amphicyonoidea
- Family: †Amphicyonidae
- Genus: †Amphicyanis; Springhorn (1977)

Type species
- Amphicyanis felinoides

Extinct genus of carnivores

Amphicyanis is an extinct genus of terrestrial carnivores belonging to the suborder Caniformia, family Amphicyonidae ("bear dog"), and which inhabited Eurasia and North America.

Amphicyanis was named by Springhorn (1977). It was assigned to Amphicyonidae by Carroll (1988).
