= Goupilictis =

Goupilictis Temporal range: Oligocene - Miocene

Scientific classification
- Kingdom: Animalia
- Phylum: Chordata
- Class: Mammalia
- Order: Carnivora
- Family: †Amphicyonidae
- Subfamily: †Amphicyoninae
- Genus: †Goupilictis; Ginsburg, 1969
- Species: †G. minor

Binomial name
- †Goupilictis minor (Dehm, 1931)

Synonyms
- Amphicyon minor Dehm, 1931

Extinct genus of carnivores

Goupilictis minor is a prehistoric species of mammal in the family Amphicyonidae. There is only one known species in the genus Goupilictis.

== Description ==
Goupilictis lived in the Oligocene and Miocene ages, about 28.4-5.332 million years ago. Fossils have been found in France, Germany and Ukraine.

== Sources ==
- Fossilworks: Goupilictis minor
- Mammalia, Carnivora, Amphicyonidae
- Goupilictis Ginsburg, 1969 - GBIF
