= Cynodictis =

Cynodictis Temporal range: Late Eocene-Early Oligocene ~37–29 Ma
- Cynodictis skull

Scientific classification
- Kingdom: Animalia
- Phylum: Chordata
- Class: Mammalia
- Order: Carnivora
- Family: †Amphicyonidae
- Subfamily: †Amphicyoninae
- Genus: †Cynodictis; Bravard and Pomel, 1850

Species
- C. cayluxens; C. crassus; C. elegans; C. exilis; C. ferox; C. lacustris; C. longirostris; C. parisiensis; C. peignei

Extinct genus of carnivores

Cynodictis ("slender dog marten") is an extinct amphicyonid carnivoran which inhabited Eurasia from the Late Eocene subepoch to the Early Oligocene subepoch living from 37.2 to 28.4 million years ago, existing for approximately 8.8 million years.

== Anatomy ==
Cynodictis had a long muzzle and a low-slung body. It had carnassial teeth for slicing chunks of meat off carcasses. It was about 30 cm at the shoulder. The species C. lacustris was a fox-like animal that weighed approximately 10 kg. A study comparing the astragali and calcanei of different amphicyonids found C. lacustris to be a digitigrade animal.

== Fossil distribution ==
Fossil specimens have been found in the Lushi Formation of Mengjiapo, China, in Weisserburg, Germany and Les Saleres in the Ager Basin of Spain, the Bembridge Limestone and Bembridge Marls Formations of the Isle of Wight, Great Britain as well as the Perrière and Quercy Phosphorites Formations and La Débruge in France.
