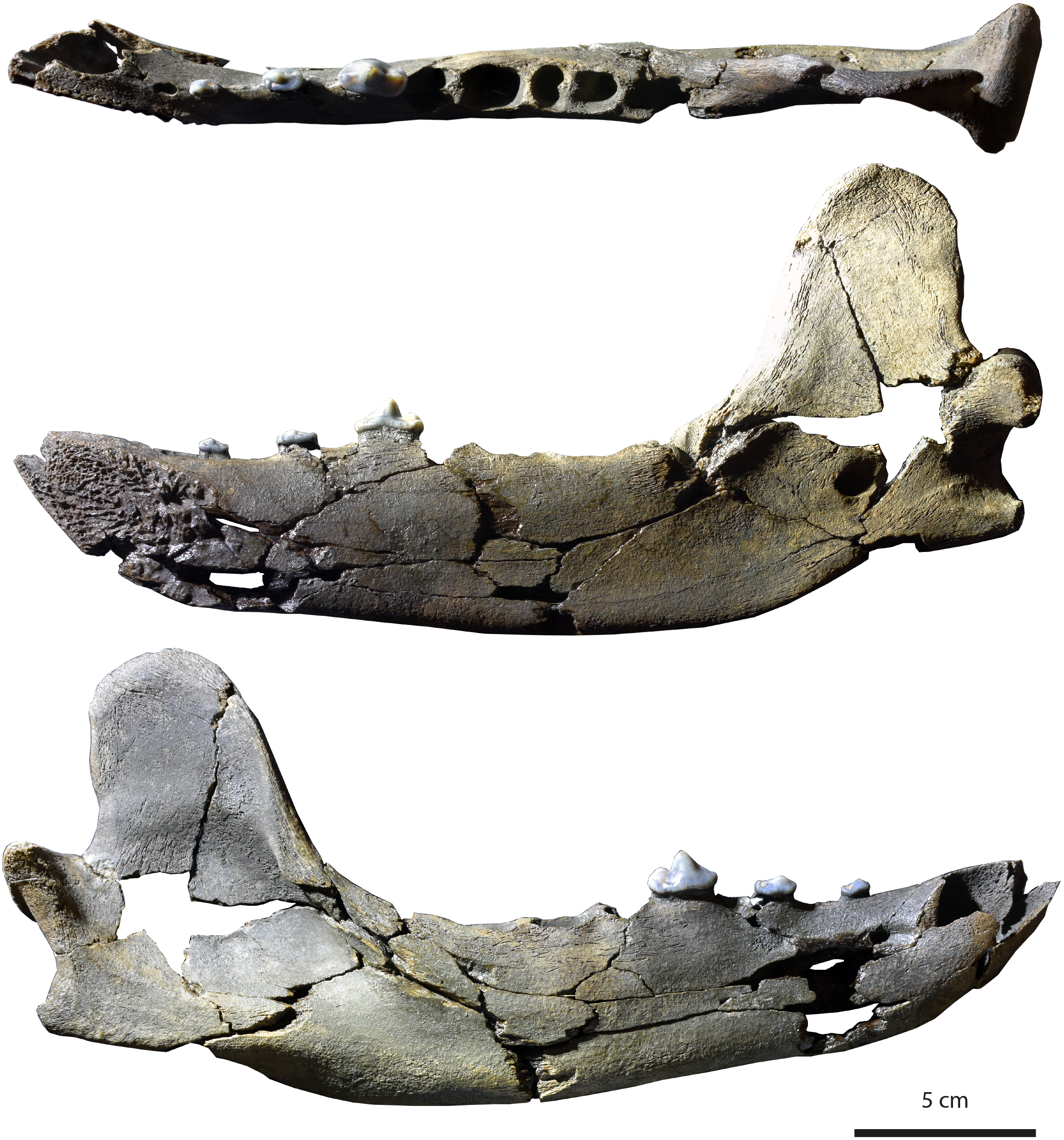
- Tartarocyon cazanavei holotype

Scientific classification
- Kingdom: Animalia
- Phylum: Chordata
- Class: Mammalia
- Order: Carnivora
- Family: †Amphicyonidae
- Genus: †Tartarocyon; Solé, Lesport, Heitz & Mennecart, 2022
- Species: †T. cazanavei

Binomial name
- †Tartarocyon cazanavei Solé, Lesport, Heitz & Mennecart, 2022

= Tartarocyon =

Tartarocyon Temporal range: Middle Miocene (Serravallian) 12.8–12.0 Ma

Extinct genus of carnivores

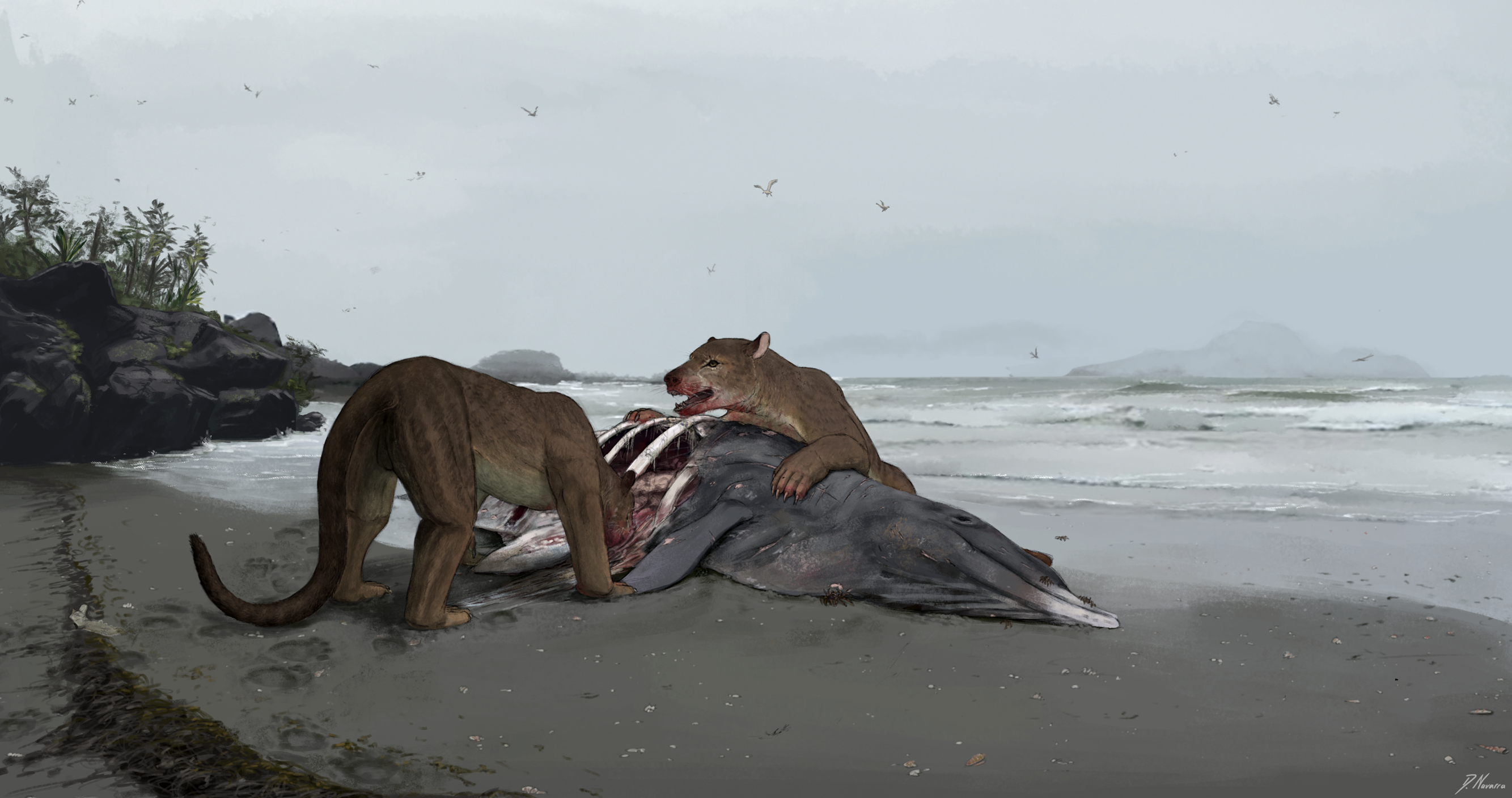
Life reconstruction of a pair of Tartarocyon cazanavei in their natural environment

Tartarocyon is an extinct genus of Amphicyonidae, that lived during the late Middle Miocene. It was described after fossilized remains found in Sallespisse, France. Despite the scarceness of its fossil remains, being only known from the holotype mandible, its body mass has been estimated to be close to 200 kilograms, far from its closest relative, Cynelos, and making it one of the largest terrestrial predators of Miocene Europe. T. cazanavei is the only species included in the genus. The genus was named after a southwestern French Pyrenees legend of a man eating giant; the species name honors the owner of the terrain in which the holotype has been discovered.
