= Iron Canyon Site =

Miocene assemblage of vertebrate fossils in California

The Iron Canyon Site is a Miocene assemblage of vertebrate fossils located in Kern County, California within the Dove Spring Formation dating from ~23.03—5.33 Ma.

== Specimens located ==
Proboscidea (Gomphotheriidae)

- Gomphotherium

Rhinocerotidae

- Peraceras
- Serbelodon S. burnhami

Equidae

- Dinohippus
- Pliohippus P. tantalus
- Megahippus M. matthewi

Amphicyonidae

- Ischyrocyon I. mohavensis

Canidae

- Epicyon E. saevus

Artiodactyla

- Alluvisorex A. chasseae
- Paracosoryx P. furlongi
- Merychyus

Lipotyphla

- Limnoecus
- Erinaceidae

Lagomorpha

- Hesperolagomys

Rodentia

- Thomomys
- Cupidinimus C. avawatzensis, C. tertius
- Perognathus P. minutus
- Geomyidae
- Eucastor
- Copemys C. dentalis, C. longidens, C. russelli
