= Tuchořice =

- Municipality
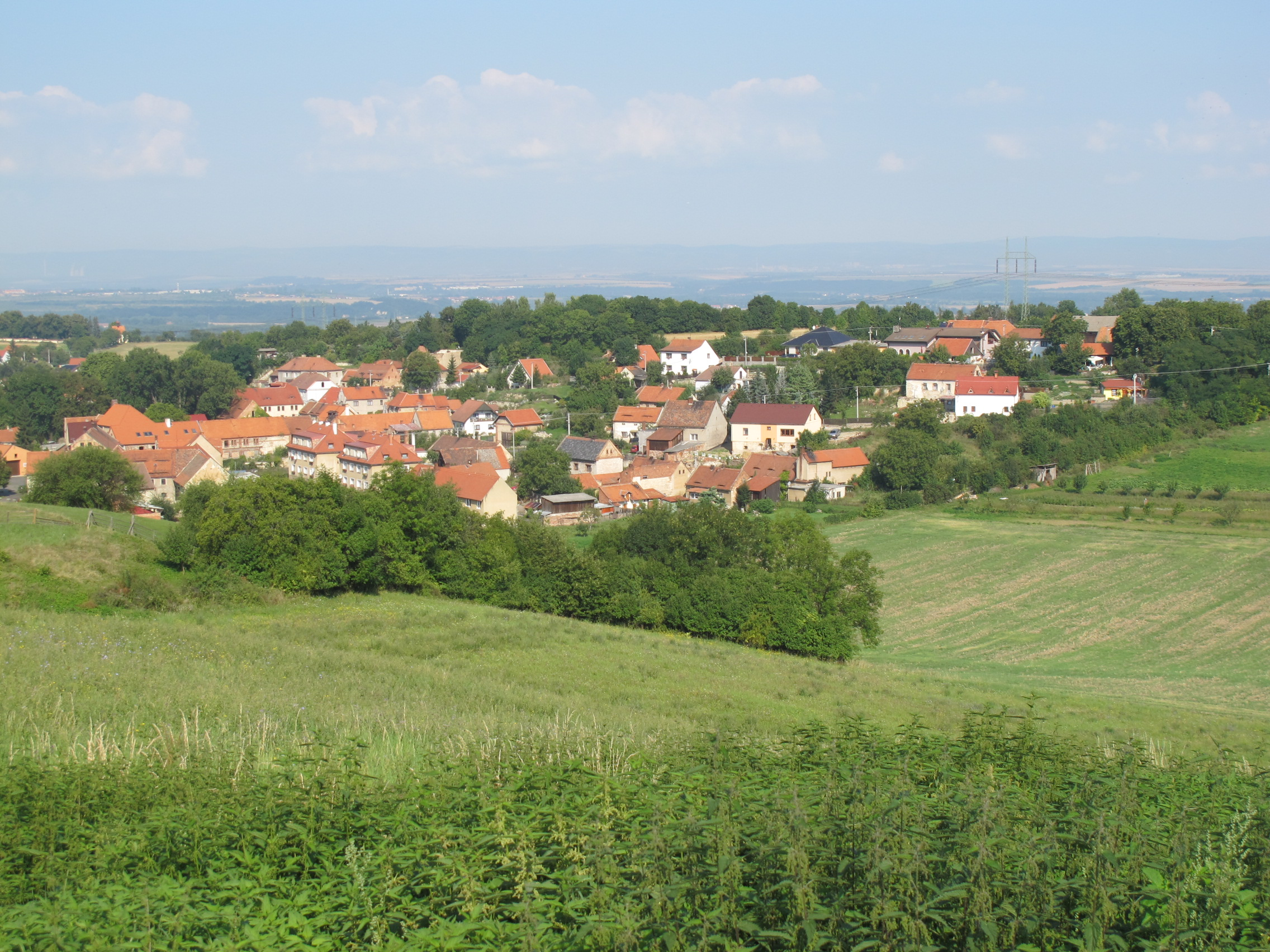
- General view

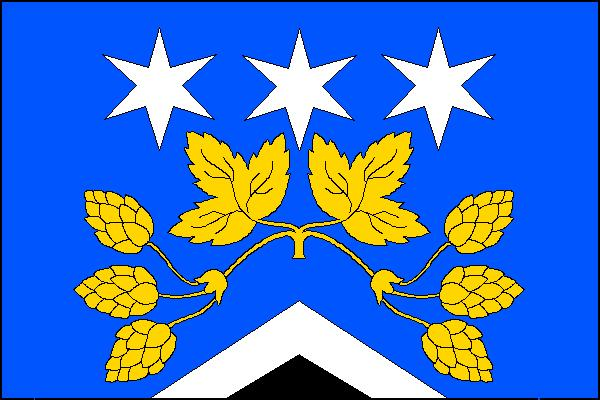
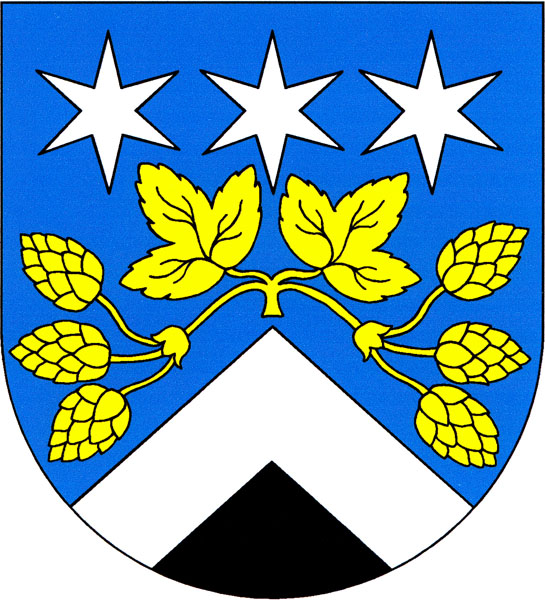
- Flag Coat of arms

- Location in the Czech Republic
- Coordinates: 50°17′5″N 13°39′45″E
- Country: Czech Republic
- Region: Ústí nad Labem
- District: Louny
- First mentioned: 1239

Area
  - Total: 23.18 km^{2} (8.95 sq mi)
- Elevation: 301 m (988 ft)

Population (2026-01-01)
  - Total: 697
  - Density: 30.1/km^{2} (77.9/sq mi)
- Time zone: UTC+1 (CET)
  - Summer (DST): UTC+2 (CEST)
- Postal codes: 438 01, 439 69
- Website: www.tuchorice.cz

Tuchořice (German: Tuchorschitz) is a municipality and village in Louny District in the Ústí nad Labem Region of the Czech Republic. It has about 700 inhabitants.

== Administrative division ==
Tuchořice consists of three municipal parts (in brackets population according to the 2021 census):

- Tuchořice (484)
- Nečemice (93)
- Třeskonice (100)

== Etymology ==
The name Tuchořice is derived from the personal name Tuchor, meaning "the village of Tuchor's people".

== Geography ==
Tuchořice is located about 13 kilometres (8 mi) southwest of Louny and 55 km (34 mi) northwest of Prague. The municipal territory extends into three geomorphological regions: the northern part with the Tuchořice village lies in the Lower Ohře Table, the central part with the Třeskonice village lies in the Džbán range and the southern part with the Nečemice village lies in the Rakovník Uplands. The highest point is the hill Výrov at 509 m (1,670 ft) above sea level.

== History ==
The first written mention of Tuchořice is from 1239. Until 1519, it was owned by the local noble family of Lords of Tuchořice. From the 1520s to 1547, it was a property of the Lobkowicz family, then the owners ofter changed. Before 1728, Tuchořice was bought by the Clary-Aldringen family. They joined it to the Dobřany estate. They had demolish the old local fortress and had built a new small Baroque castle on its site. The Clary-Aldringens owned Tuchořice until 1879.

== Demographics ==
Historical population

Year	Pop.	±%
1869	1,687	—
1880	1,756	+4.1%
1890	1,694	−3.5%
1900	1,775	+4.8%
1910	1,672	−5.8%

Year	Pop.	±%
1921	1,508	−9.8%
1930	1,651	+9.5%
1950	908	−45.0%
1961	806	−11.2%
1970	823	+2.1%

Year	Pop.	±%
1980	764	−7.2%
1991	696	−8.9%
2001	689	−1.0%
2011	651	−5.5%
2021	677	+4.0%

Source: Censuses

== Economy ==
The former Baroque castle was rebuilt in 1966 and lost its historical value. Since 1970, it has been used as an institute of social welfare.

== Transport ==
There are no railways or major roads passing through the municipality.

== Sights ==
The main landmark is the Church of Saint Bartholomew, located in Nečemice. It was originally a Gothic church from the mid-14th century, rebuilt in the late Baroque style in 1786.

== Paleontology ==
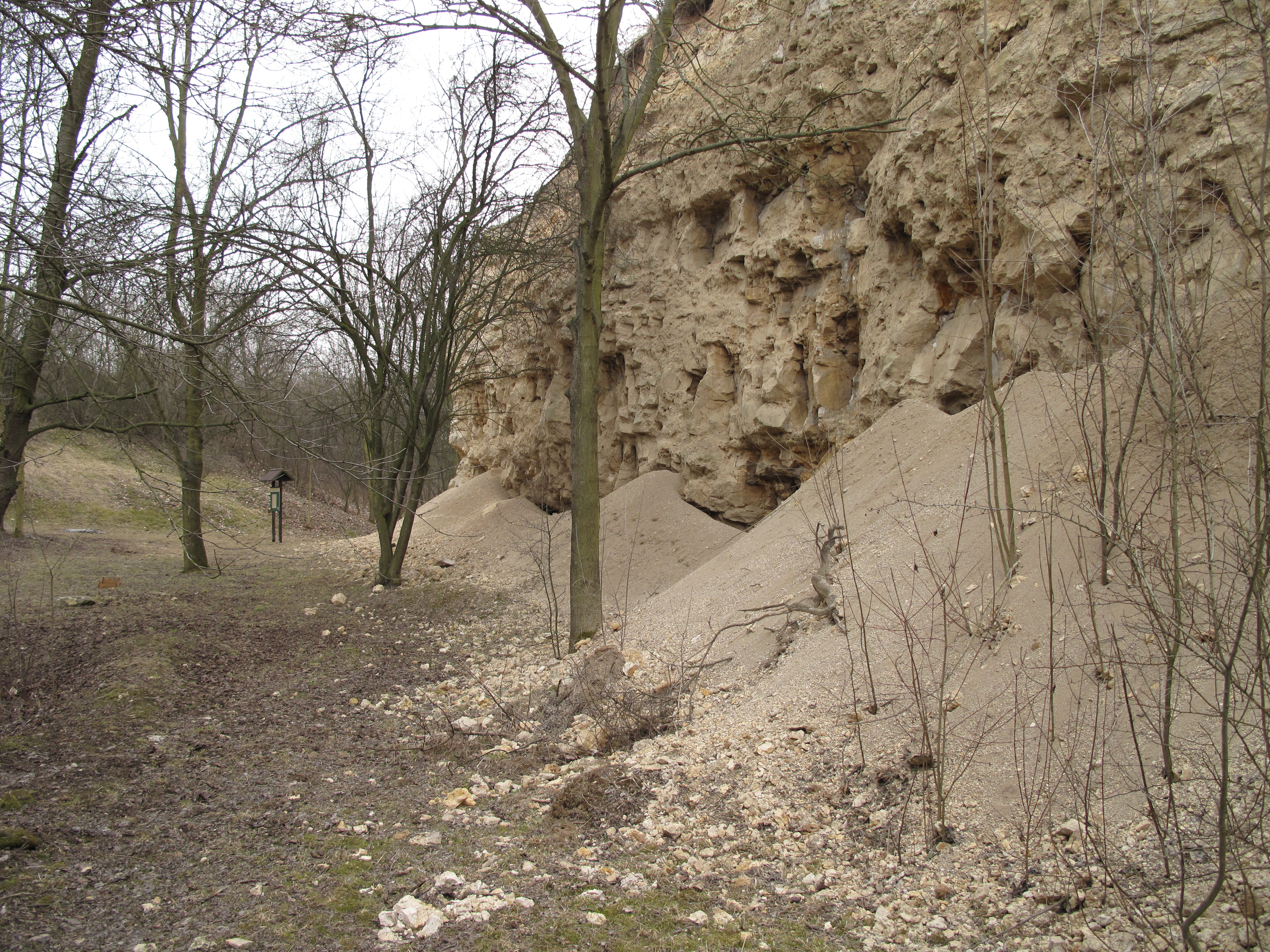
Miocenní sladkovodní vápence Nature Monument

In Tuchořice is a paleontological site with Miocene lacustrine limestone deposits. It is protected as the Miocenní sladkovodní vápence Nature Monument with an area of 1.8 ha (4.4 acres). Some 90 species of molluscs were found in this site. The majority of those species are land snails and some of them were originally described from Tuchořice. Additionally, the remains of the species of Amphicyonidae, Rhinoceros, Aureliachoerus and Palaeomeryx have been found at this site.
