= Brachycyon =

Brachycyon Temporal range: 23.3–7 Ma Early Miocene - Late Miocene

Scientific classification
- Domain: Eukaryota
- Kingdom: Animalia
- Phylum: Chordata
- Class: Mammalia
- Order: Carnivora
- Family: †Amphicyonidae
- Genus: †Brachycyon; Filhol, 1872

Species
- †B. reyi; †B. palaeolycos

Extinct genus of carnivores

Brachycyon is an extinct genus of terrestrial carnivores belonging to the suborder Caniformia, family Amphicyonidae ("bear dog"), which inhabited Eurasia and North America.

Brachycyon was named by Filhol (1872). It was assigned to Amphicyonidae by Carroll (1988).
