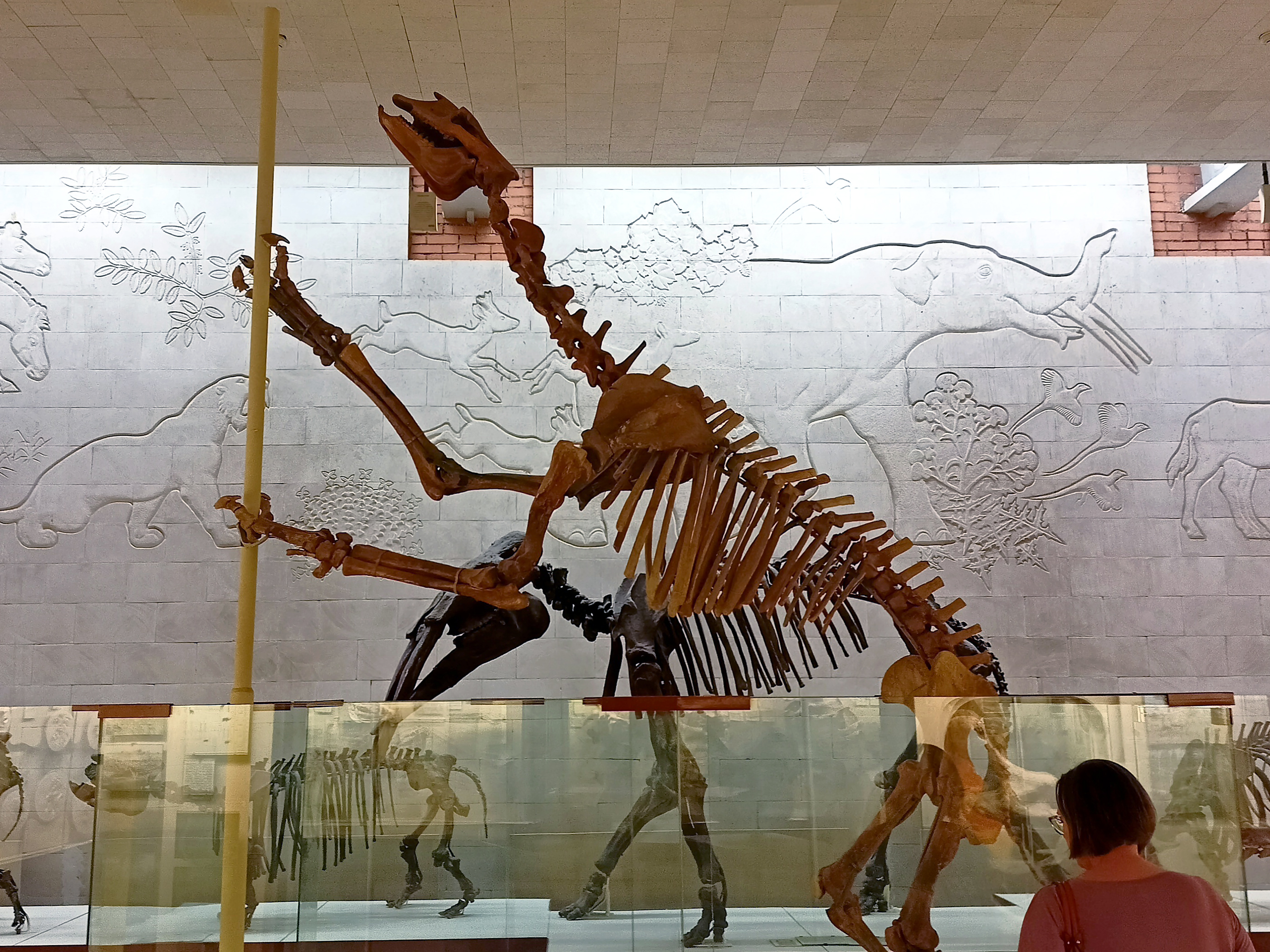

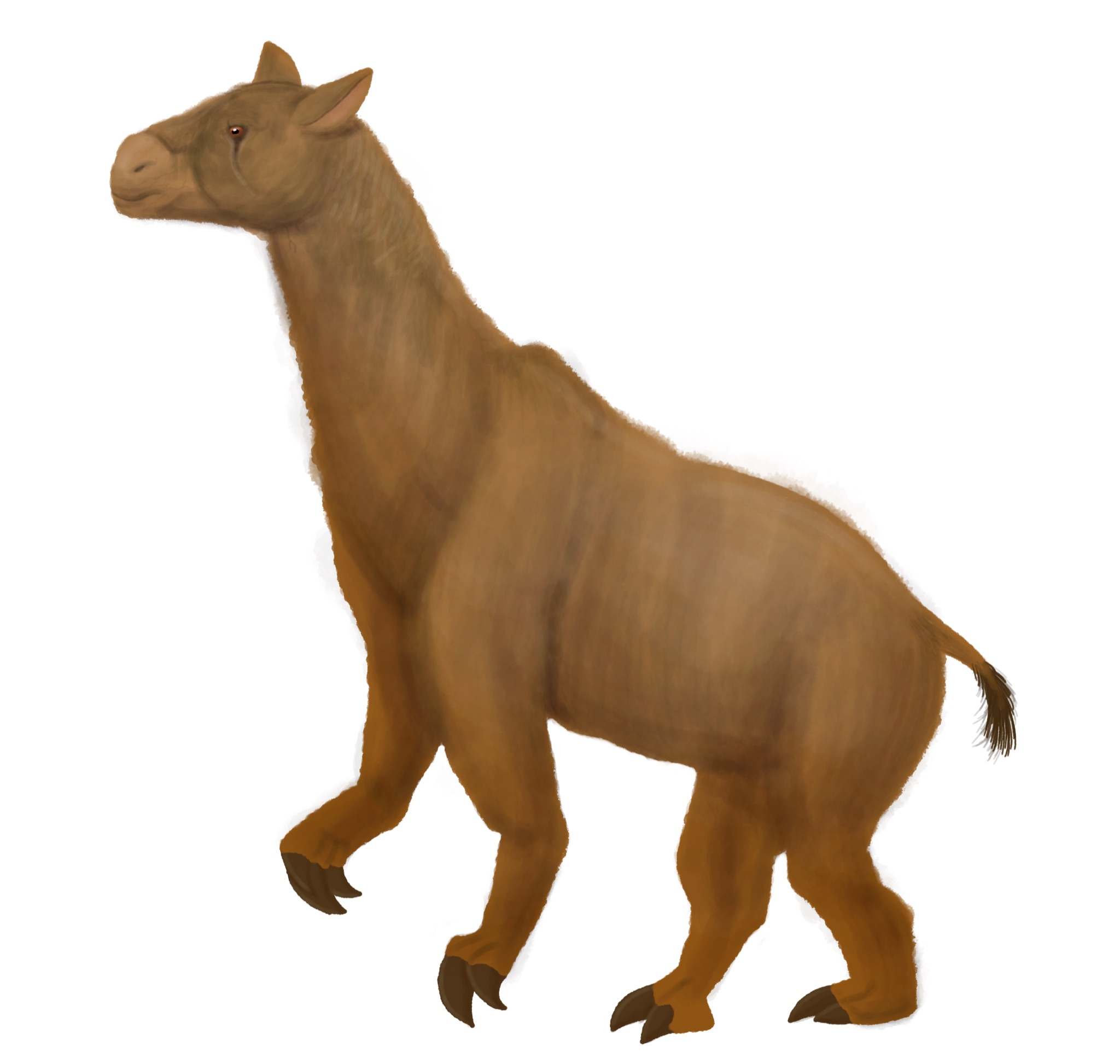
- Mounted skeleton (top) and life restoration (bottom)

Scientific classification
- Kingdom: Animalia
- Phylum: Chordata
- Class: Mammalia
- Infraclass: Placentalia
- Order: Perissodactyla
- Family: †Chalicotheriidae
- Subfamily: †Schizotheriinae
- Genus: †Borissiakia; Butler, 1965

Type species
- †Borissiakia betpakdalensis originally Moropus betpakdalensis Flerov, 1938

= Borissiakia =

Borissiakia Temporal range: Late Oligocene

Extinct genus of herbivorous odd-toed ungulates

Borissiakia is an extinct genus of chalicothere, a group of herbivorous, odd-toed ungulate (perissodactyl) mammals, that lived during the late Oligocene in Kazakhstan. They had claws that were likely used in a hook-like manner to pull down branches, suggesting they lived as bipedal browsers.

Borissiakia reached 4 metres (13 ft) in length and reached 2.3 metres (7.5 ft) tall at the shoulders. It could weigh up to 600 kilograms (1,300 lb).

== Sources ==
- Classification of Mammals by Malcolm C. McKenna and Susan K. Bell
