= Haplocyon =

Haplocyon Temporal range: Late Oligocene

Scientific classification
- Kingdom: Animalia
- Phylum: Chordata
- Class: Mammalia
- Order: Carnivora
- Family: †Amphicyonidae
- Genus: †Haplocyon; Schlosser (1901)

Species
- †H. elegans; †H. crucians; †H. dombrowski

Extinct genus of carnivores

Haplocyon is an extinct genus of terrestrial carnivores belonging to the Carnivoran suborder Caniformia, family Amphicyonidae ("bear dog") named by Schlosser in 1901. It lived in Europe between 28.4 and 23.03 Mya, during the Late Oligocene.
