= Entotympanic =

The entotympanic is a bone found in the ear region of many placental mammals. When present it forms the medioventral part of the auditory bulla; it is a neomorphic element derived from the tubal cartilage and the sheath of the tympanohyal. It is found in a wide variety of placental mammals, including Xenarthra, Afroinsectophilia, Hyracoidea, Pholidota, Carnivora, Perissodactyla, Chiroptera, Dermoptera, and Scandentia; it is (apparently secondarily) reduced or absent in Glires, Primates, Eulipotyphla, and Artiodactyla (including Cetacea). It is the only common neomorphic element of the mammalian skull.

The entotympanic contacts the ectotympanic, with which it makes up the auditory bulla.
