= Pseudarctos =

Pseudarctos Temporal range: 16.9–11.1 Ma Middle Miocene

Scientific classification
- Kingdom: Animalia
- Phylum: Chordata
- Class: Mammalia
- Infraclass: Placentalia
- Order: Carnivora
- Family: †Amphicyonidae
- Genus: †Pseudarctos; Schlosser, 1899
- Species: †P. bavaricus

Binomial name
- †Pseudarctos bavaricus Schlosser, 1899

Extinct genus of carnivores

Pseudarctos is a member of the extinct family Amphicyonidae of terrestrial carnivores belonging to the suborder Caniformia, which inhabited Eurasia in the Middle Miocene subepoch 16.9—11.1 Ma, existing for approximately 5.8 million years.

Pseudarctos was named Schlosser in 1899 and was assigned to Amphicyonidae by Carroll (1988). It was the size of a large fox.

== Fossil distribution ==
Pseudarctos has been uncovered in Tung Gur China, Sandberg, Slovakia, and Malartic, a la ferme Larrieu, France.
