= Ectotympanic =

The ectotympanic, or tympanicum, is a bony structure found in all mammals, located on the tympanic part of the temporal bone, which holds the tympanic membrane (eardrum) in place. In catarrhine primates (including humans), it takes a tube-shape. Its position and attachment to the skull vary between primates, and can be either inside or outside the auditory bulla.

It is homologous with the angular bone of non-mammalian tetrapods. When the latter is present, it contacts the entotympanic.
