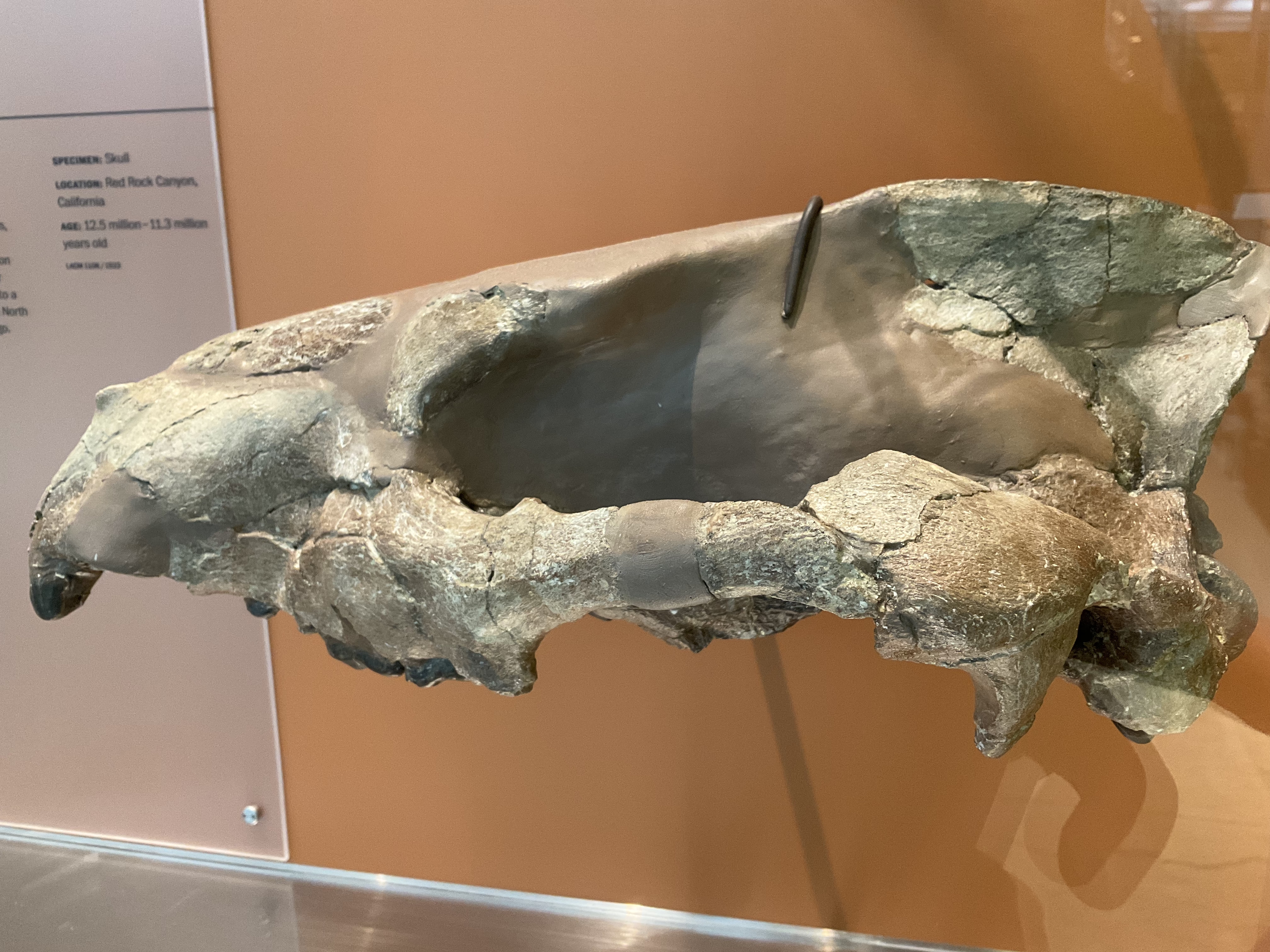
- I. mohavensis (LACM 1108/1522)

Scientific classification
- Kingdom: Animalia
- Phylum: Chordata
- Class: Mammalia
- Order: Carnivora
- Family: †Amphicyonidae
- Subfamily: †Amphicyoninae
- Genus: †Ischyrocyon; Matthew and Gidley (1904)

Species
- Ischyrocyon gidleyi Matthew, 1902; Ischyrocyon hyaenodus Matthew & Gidley, 1904

= Ischyrocyon =

Ischyrocyon Temporal range: Middle to Late Miocene (Barstovian-Clarendonian) 14–9 Ma

Extinct genus of carnivores

Ischyrocyon is an extinct genus of amphicyonids that inhabited North America during the Late Miocene. It lived 14 to 9 Ma ago, existing for approximately 5 million years.

== Behavior ==
In a study published in 2006, examination of the relative grinding area of the molars of Ischyrocyon indicated that it was purely carnivorous, and not omnivorous as previously assumed. Both Ischyrocyon and its relative, Amphicyon possessed skeletal features that are characteristic of both ambush and pursuit living predators. As such, it is believed via this evidence that Ischyrocyon probably pursued prey for longer distances but at slower speeds than living ambush predators do. Upon catching up to its prey, Ischyrocyon probably grabbed its victims using its powerfully muscled forelimbs before killing them by tearing into the prey's ribcage or neck using its large, strong canines set in its narrow snout.

== Fossil distribution ==
- Blair Junction, Esmeralda County, Nevada ~14.2—11.7 Ma.
- Hemicyon Quarry Site, Barstow Formation, San Bernardino County, California ~14.0 Ma.
- Adam Risley Ranch Site, Goliad Formation, Donley County, Texas ~12—11.7 Ma.
- WaKeeney (Unit C) Ogallala Formation, Trego County, Kansas ~11.8—11.7 Ma.
- Olcott Hill, Snake Creek Formation, Sioux County, Nebraska ~11.9 Ma.
- Iron Canyon Site, Dove Spring Formation, Kern County, California ~11.8—11.9 Ma.
- Bluejay Quarry Site, Ash Hollow Formation, Antelope County, Nebraska ~11.8 Ma.
