= Crucian =

Crucian can refer to:

- A person who is from Saint Croix, U.S. Virgin Islands
- A dialect of Virgin Islands Creole, spoken on St. Croix, U.S. Virgin Islands
- Crucian carp, a freshwater fish
- Crucian (Dungeons & Dragons), a creature in Dungeons & Dragons
