= Afrocyon =

Afrocyon Temporal range: Miocene-Pliocene

Scientific classification
- Kingdom: Animalia
- Phylum: Chordata
- Class: Mammalia
- Infraclass: Placentalia
- Order: Carnivora
- Family: †Amphicyonidae
- Genus: †Afrocyon; Arambourg, 1961

Type species
- Afrocyon burolleti Arambourg, 1961

Species
- †Afrocyon burolleti

Extinct genus of carnivores

Afrocyon is an extinct genus of large, mostly carnivorous bone-crushing mammals known as bear dogs, of the family Amphicyonidae endemic to Africa during the Miocene to Pliocene living from 11.6 to 5.3 Ma and existed for approximately 6.3 million years.

== Taxonomy ==
Afrocyon was named by Arambourg (1961). It was assigned to Amphicyonidae by Carroll (1988).
