= Ictiocyon =

Ictiocyon Temporal range: Miocene

Scientific classification
- Domain: Eukaryota
- Kingdom: Animalia
- Phylum: Chordata
- Class: Mammalia
- Order: Carnivora
- Suborder: Caniformia
- Superfamily: †Amphicyonoidea
- Family: †Amphicyonidae
- Genus: †Ictiocyon; Crusafont Pairó (1955)

Extinct genus of carnivores

Ictiocyon is an extinct genus of bear dogs endemic to Asia during the Miocene. It lived from 23.03 to 15.97 Ma, existing for approximately 7 million years.
