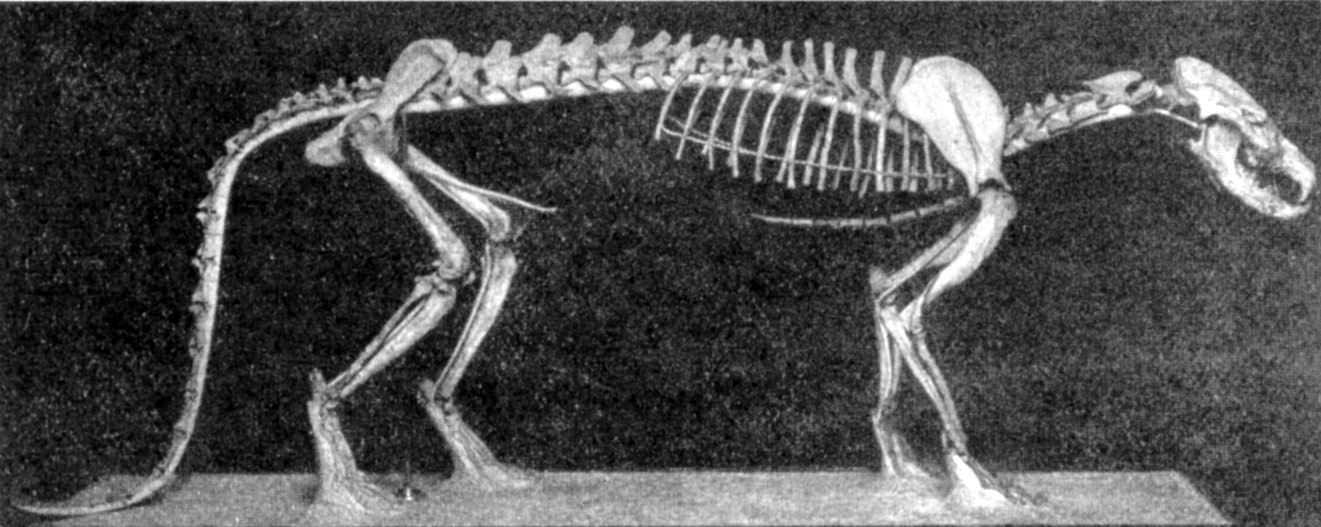
- D. superbus skeleton

Scientific classification
- Domain: Eukaryota
- Kingdom: Animalia
- Phylum: Chordata
- Class: Mammalia
- Order: Carnivora
- Family: †Amphicyonidae
- Subfamily: †Daphoeninae
- Genus: †Daphoenodon; Peterson 1909

Species
- †D. falkenbachi; †D. notionastes; †D. robustum; †D. skinneri; †D. superbus

Synonyms
- Borocyon

= Daphoenodon =

Daphoenodon Temporal range: 20.43–15.97 Ma Early - Middle Miocene

Extinct genus of carnivores

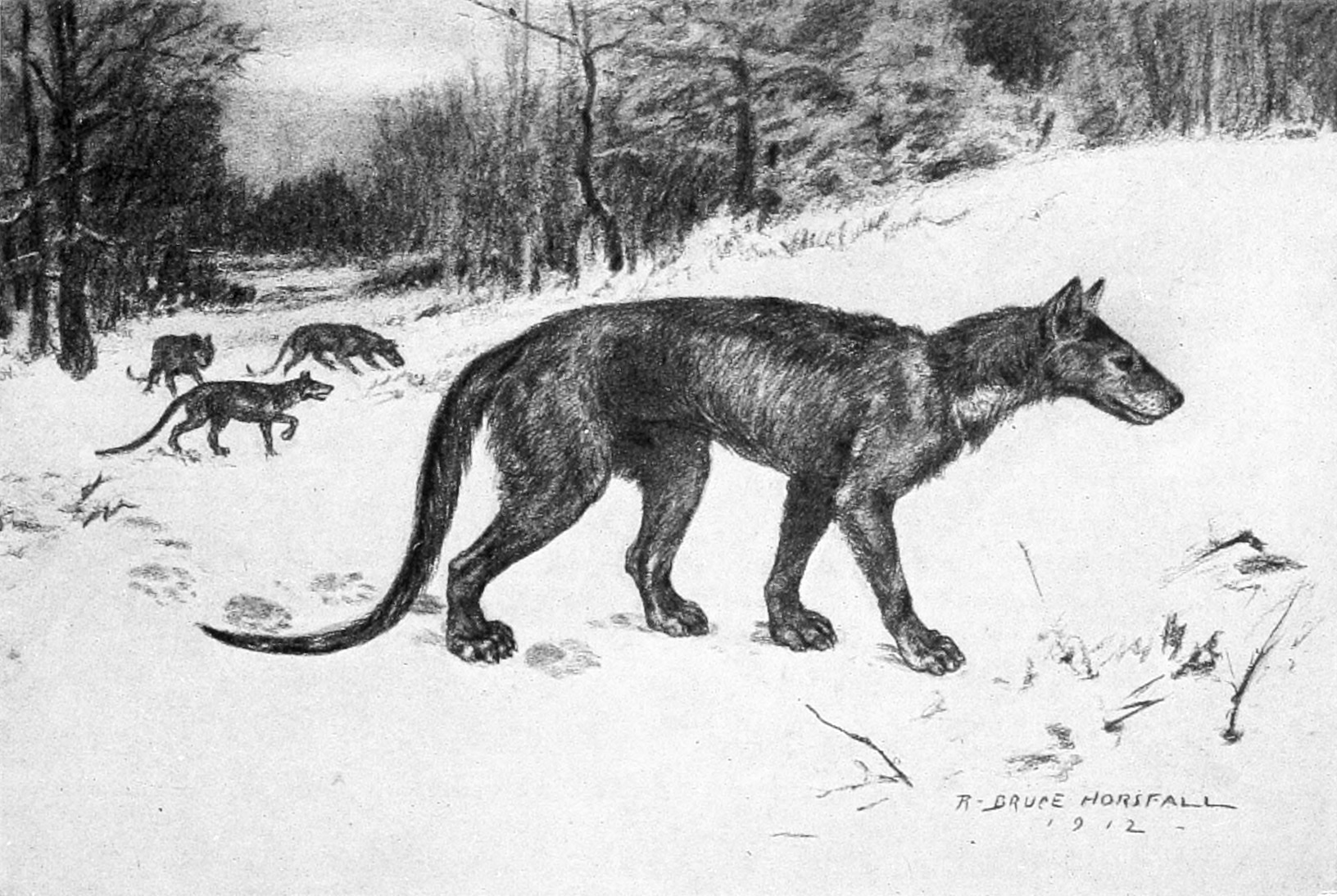
Restoration of D. superbus

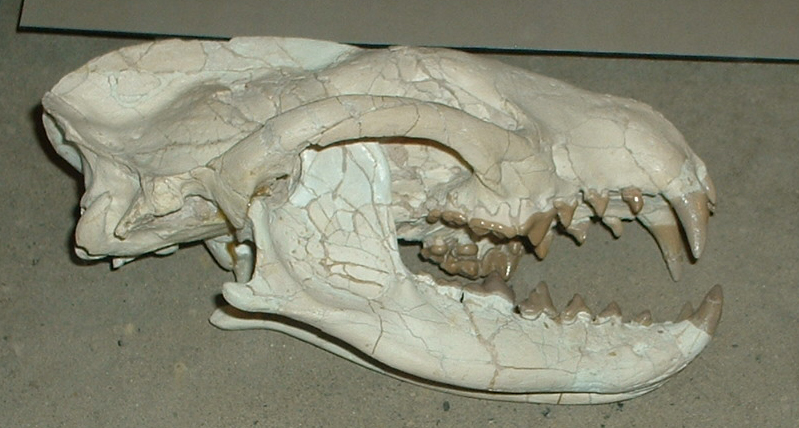
D. superbus skull

Daphoenodon is an extinct genus of terrestrial carnivore, which lived in the early Miocene and belonged to the family Amphicyonidae ("bear dogs") of the suborder Caniformia. The species of Daphoenodon are characterized by limbs that are specialized in fore and aft movement, as well as a body alignment that results in a lengthened stride.

== Species ==
D. falkenbachi was a larger species that was found in northern Goshen, southeastern Platte Counties, Wyoming, and Nebraska. A smaller species, D. skinneri, was found in southern Wyoming. In one large species, D. robustum, the forelimb is elongated, making the adaptation for pursuing prey over open terrain very evident. The skeletal structure of D. robustum shows a predator that shares characteristics with highly evolved modern species—wolves and cheetahs—as well as large ambush wild cats (felids)—lions and tigers.
