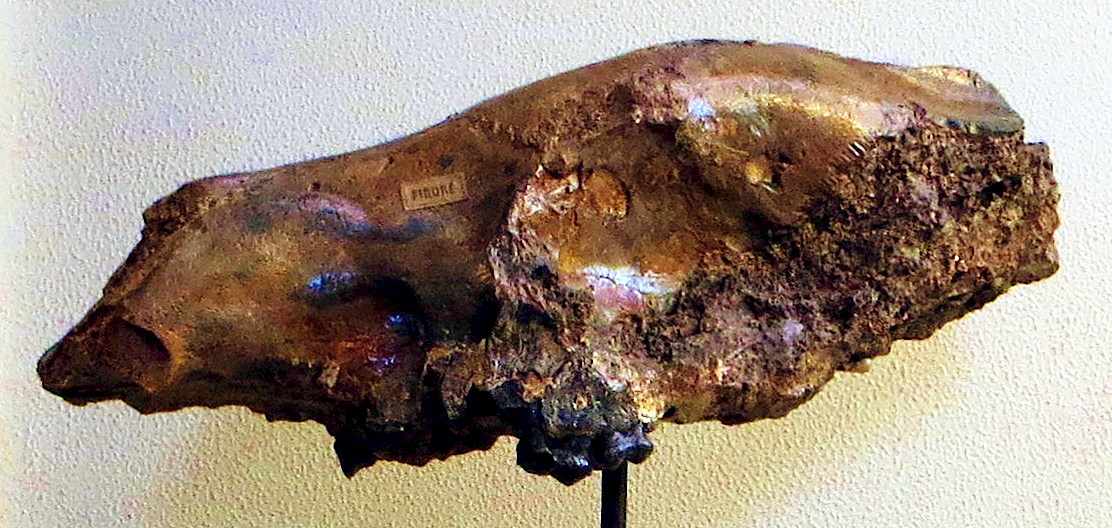
- C. lemanensis skull
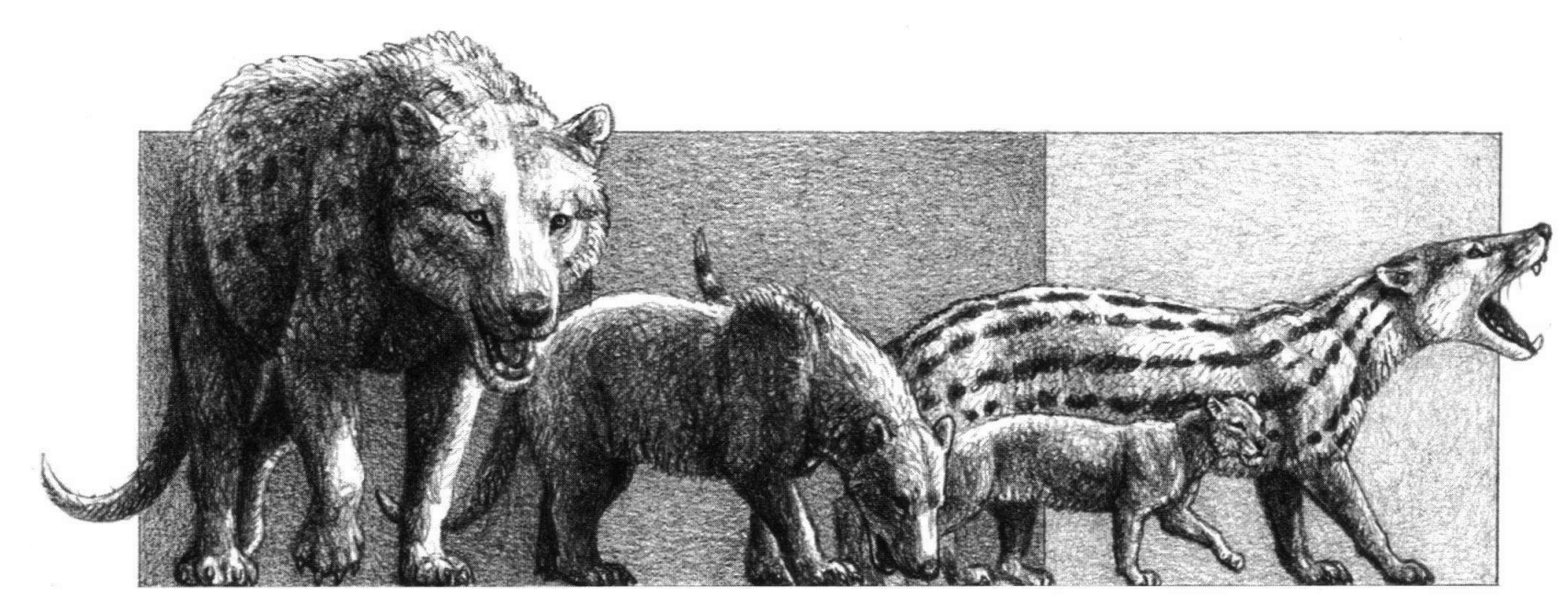
- Restoration of Hyainailouros sulzeri (far left), Cynelos eurydon, Afrosmilus africanus and Hyainailouros napakensis (far right)

Scientific classification
- Kingdom: Animalia
- Phylum: Chordata
- Class: Mammalia
- Order: Carnivora
- Suborder: Caniformia
- Family: †Amphicyonidae
- Subfamily: †Amphicyoninae
- Genus: †Cynelos; Jourdan, 1862

Type species
- †Amphicyon lemanensis

Species
- See text

= Cynelos =

Cynelos Temporal range: 20.4–13.7 Ma Early Miocene - Late Miocene

Extinct genus of carnivores

Cynelos is a large extinct genus of amphicyonids which inhabited North America, Europe, and Africa from the Early Miocene subepoch to the Late Miocene subepoch 20.4–13.7 Mya, existing for approximately 6 million years.

== Species ==
- C. caroniavorus White, 1942
- C. idoneus Matthew, 1924
- C. lemanensis Pomel, 1846
- C. malasi Hunt & Stepleton, 2015
- C. stenos Hunt Jr. and Yatkola, 2020
- C. jitu Morlo, 2021
- C. sinapius Matthew, 1902
