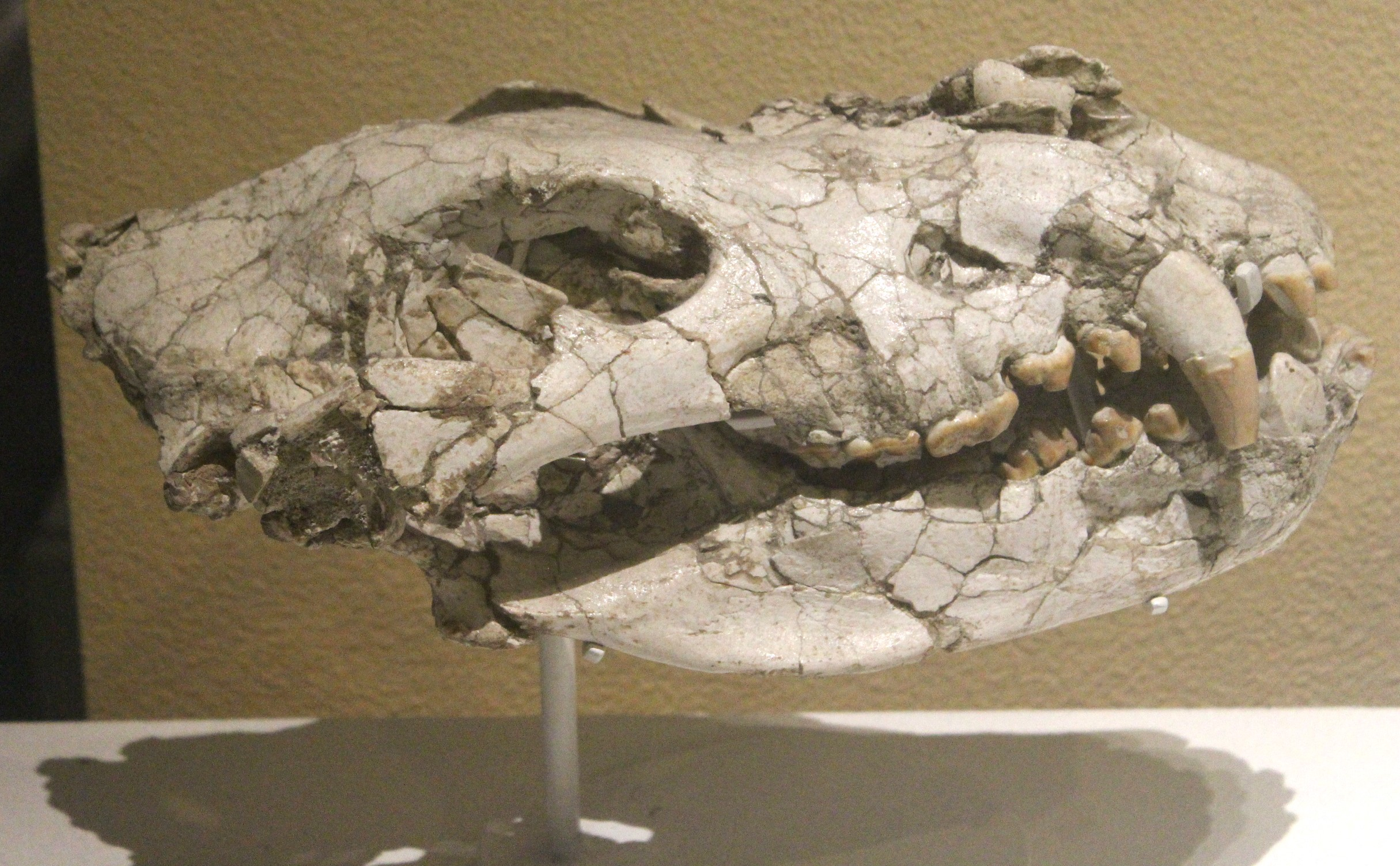
- Skull of G. macrognathus, National Natural History Museum of China

Scientific classification
- Kingdom: Animalia
- Phylum: Chordata
- Class: Mammalia
- Infraclass: Placentalia
- Order: Carnivora
- Family: †Amphicyonidae
- Genus: †Gobicyon; Colbert, 1939

Type species
- †Gobicyon macrognathus Colbert, 1939

Other species
- Gobicyon acutus Jiangzuo et al., 2019; Gobicyon serbiae Ginsburg, 1999; Gobicyon yei Jiangzuo et al., 2019; Gobicyon zhegalloi Gabunia, 1981

Synonyms
- Haplocyonoides serbiae Ginsburg, 1999

= Gobicyon =

Gobicyon Temporal range: Late Burdigalian to Serravallian, ~16–11.5 Ma

Extinct genus of carnivores

Gobicyon is an extinct genus of large-sized carnivoran mammals, belonging to the Amphicyonidae ("bear dogs"), that was discovered in China, Mongolia, and Serbia, and lived during the Middle Miocene epoch. Despite only being known from rather fragmentary remains, recent discoveries showcase that it was an aberrant member of the subfamily Haplocyoninae, with adaptions towards bone-crushing similar to those of a hyaena.

== History and naming ==
Gobicyon was described by Edwin Harris Colbert in 1939, on the basis of the anterior part of a mandible (AMNH FM2659) discovered in the Inner Mongolian Tunggur Formation, who considered it to be a relative of borophagine canids such as Aelurodon and Tomarctus. A mandible from Serbia, described in 1959, was originally assigned to the type species, G. macrognathus, before being moved to Haplocynoides as new species H. serbiae by Ginsburg in 1999. However, later authors note the similarity between this species and G. macrognathus, and have pointed out that Ginsburg incorrectly described the defining characteristic of his new species, and therefore assign it to Gobicyon. Furthermore, the species G. zhegalloi was described by Gabunia in 1981 on the basis of a mandibular fragment found in northwestern Mongolia.

A more detailed review of the genus, including the description of two new species, was published in 2019. This study was based on the discovery of various remains across China, most notably from the Zhang'enbao Formation of Ningxia, during the preceding decades.

== Description ==
Gobicyon was a large amphicyonid, with G. serbiae having been estimated at 109 kg and the remains from Laogou at 162 kg. It should however be noted, that Gobicyon is only known from cranial and dental remains, which may lead to an overestimation of their mass, as some amphicyonids possess disproportionately large heads in comparison to their body size.

The characteristic traits of Gobicyon are a short snout, deep mandibular ramus, an extremely broad and robust symphysis, giving it a hyaena-like appearance, and large premolars. A platform is formed by the dorsal face of the symphysis, similar to the condition seen in the African wild dog. This enhancement is correlated with the ability to better handle large prey. While the Zx/Zy values obtained for G. macrognathus are smaller than those of the temnocyonines, they still showcase their ability to resist the torsional stresses caused by struggling prey during the canine bite, as in large felids. An angular "chin" can be seen from the side, similar to that seen in some ursids and hyaenas. The lower incisors are well-developed, with the lateral ones being larger than the central ones. The canine is large and robust. The first lower premolar is very small and has almost disappeared, whereas the other premolars are large and high, with distinct accessory cusps. A trenchant blade, most developed on p4 and least developed on p2, is formed by an upgrowth from the swollen cingulum. The talonid of the first molar consists of a well-developed hypoconid and entoconid. The second lower molar is elongated. The first upper incisor is small, while the second, and especially third, are large and have strong lateral keels. The upper premolars resemble the lower ones, as the first one is small, and the second and third one also possess distinct accessory cusps. The third upper molar is lost in all species except for the most primitive one, G. yei. Indeed, a trend towards reduced upper posterior molars and a contemporaneous strengthening of P4 and M1 can be observed, indicating that the crushing function of its dentition moved forward to the premolars and first molar over the course of its evolution. A similar trend can be seen in hyaenas, which possess similar adaptions towards bone-crushing. The dental forma of Gobicyon macrognathus is $\frac{3.3.4.2.}{3.3.4.2.}$.

No postcranial remains that can be definitely assigned to Gobicyon are known. However, deductions about its body shape can be made based on comparisons with its relatives. Other haplocyonines, such as Haplocyonoides suevicus possess elongated metapodials. Due to this, some foot bones from the Halamagai Formation have been tentatively assigned to Gobicyon, which support the presence of cursorial adaptions in this genus.

== Classification and evolution ==
The closest relative of Gobicyon is Aktaucyon from Kazakhstan. Both genera possess enlarged premolars, a centrally located M1 protocone and a uniformly developed M1 lingual cingulum. Aktaucyon also has a large M2 and a large and anteriorly located protocone, which are very similar to those of G. yei, suggesting that these features are derived for haplocyonines, but primitive for Gobicyon. Due to their close relationship, Kordikova et al. erected the tribe Aktaucyonini for the two genera. However, they considered it to be part of the Daphoeninae, which is endemic to North America, and lacks their enlarged premolars, making their assignment to this subfamily unlikely. They do share numerous features with the Temnocyoninae, which may be the sister group of the haplocyonines, who evolved similar adaptions convergently. But as this subfamily is also restricted to North America, died out several million years prior to the appearance of Gobicyon, and lacks several features the genus shares with other haplocyonines, most notably the strongly anterobuccally turned p2, but also the large M2 found in G. yei and less derived haplocyonines alike, referral of Aktaucyonini to this subfamily is ruled out. Within the Haplocyoninae, Gobicyon is an aberrant taxon, showing pronounced differences to all other genera, except for Aktaucyon, by the pronounced cusps on its central premolars, the weaker angle between the P4 paracone and metacone and the reduction of metaconid and entoconid on its nearly sagittally symmetrical first two lower molars. It does, however, possess more similarities with Haplocyonopsis than with Haplocyon and Haplocyonoides. The considerable differences between the Aktaucyonini and other members of the subfamily suggest that they represent an early diverging branch, instead of being derived from one of the other genera.

Below is a cladogram showcasing the phylogenetic relationships of Gobicyon, taken from Jiangzuo et al., 2021:

- Adilophontes
- - - Amphicyon
    - Cynelos
  - - - Temnocyon
      - Haplocyon
      - - Haplocyonoides
        - - Haplocyonopsis
          - Aktaucyonini
            - Aktaucyon
            - Gobicyon yei
            - Gobicyon zhegalloi
            - - Gobicyon macrognathus
              - Gobicyon acutus

=== Species ===
G. acutus

It is both the most derived and youngest member of the genus, being found near in the Hujialiang Formation at Yadang, Gansu in association with a Kubanochoerus skeleton, suggesting that it lived near the boundary of the Middle to Late Miocene. The protocone of its p4 is rather small, and the posterior molars are greatly reduced, whereas the premolars are robust and distinct posterolingual convexities are developed on P2 and P3. This clearly showcases the forward movement of the dentitions crushing function during the evolution of Gobicyon. This is further supported by the fact that G. acutus possesses an enlarged paracone on its first upper molar. The two skulls found at Yadang are of different size and robustness, indicating sexual dimorphism.

G. macrognathus

This is both the type and most completely known species of Gobicyon. Its fossils have been found in the Tunggur Formation of Inner Mongolia, more specifically the Wolf Camp, which belongs to the Morgen Fauna of the middle Formation, and correlates to early MN7/8. It is also known from Gujiabei, Shataigou and Beigoudonggou, which belong to the lower/middle subfaunas of Zhang'enbao Formation and correlate to MN5/6, and the Laogou Fauna of the Hujialiang Formation, which is slightly younger than the Dingjia'ergou fauna. Distinct characteristics of this species include the "waist" of its M1, which is located just lingual to the buccal cusp, and the lack of an expanded inner lobe. Uniquely among Gobicyon its p3, p4 and P4 bear distinct anterior accessory cuspids. The posterior cingulid cuspid of the fourth lower molar is subdivided as in the African wild dog.

G. serbiae

This poorly known species is the only European member of the genus, and is known from a mandible discovered at Prebreza in Serbia (MN 6) and a mandibular fragment from the locality Tairum Nor, which corresponds to European MN6, and is part of the Tunggur Formation. G. serbiae is very similar to G. macrognathus, and differs from that species by the lack of anterior accessory cusps on p3 and p4, and by the lower margin of the enamel on its p4 and m1, which are nearly straight. It is proposed that this species is considered valid until more material is described.

G. yei

This species is known from a single rostrum discovered at the site of Gunziling in the Zhang'enbao Formation of Tongxin, Ningxia, where it was a member of the Dingjia'ergou fauna. It is a primitive member of the genus, and still possesses a button-like M3, as well as a large M2, which is only slightly smaller than its M1. Its P4 has a distinct buccal concavity and a large, anteriorily protruding protocone. These two characteristics are also found in Haplocyon and Haplocyonoides, and represent a primitive character of the subfamily.

G. zhegalloi

This is the largest species of the genus, and also the most poorly known, and is differentiated from the others by its proportionally larger m2 and p4. Its m1 is also aberrant, as the metaconid nearly in line with the protoconid and the hypoconid, whereas it completely disappeared in G. serbiae and G. macrognathus, and is least reduced in most other hypercarnivorous Caniformia. This may have helped it to crack bone. A similar characteristic is seen in the bears Arctodus and Arctotherium. It is known from Hingis-Nor of north-western Mongolia, which dates to the late early Miocene or early middle Miocene, corresponding to European MN4-MN5, the Halamagai Formation of Xinjiang, which corresponds to MN5, and the locality Beigoudonggou of the Zhang'enbao Formation.

== Palaeoenvironment ==
The Halamagai Formation, where Gobicyon zhegalloi was discovered, preserves a diverse assemblage of amphicyonids, which also includes the large Amphicyon ulungurensis and several species of the genus Cynelos. Pollen data indicate that the environment was a rather arid prairie and dominated by grasses and Artemisia, with only scattered trees. This is furthermore supported by the presence of the earliest known grazing gomphothere, and the isotope analysis of the giraffid Discokeryx, which suggest it was an open-land grazer. Several smaller taxons known from the formation are also associated with arid and open habitats, most notably the ground squirrel Atlantoxerus and the ochotonid Alloptox. However, other mammals are more indicative of a humid environment, with patches of forests. These include Amphicyon and Cynelos, bats, browsing proboscideans, the beaver Steneofiber, the cervid Stephanocemas, the moschid Micromeryx and, most notably, the primate Pliopithecus. Especially the latter genus indicates the presence of at least local humid environments in an otherwise drier region, and a more diverse terrain than often assumed. Other genera found at the site include the mustelid Tungurictis, the small hyaenid Protictitherium, a nimravid, the browsing horse Anchitherium, the anthracothere Elomeryx and the lagomerycid Stephanocemas.

The slightly younger Moergen fauna of the Tunggur Formation also shows a mix of small animals adapted to an arid habitat, such as Atlantoxerus, the hedgehog Mioechinus, various ochotonids, cricetids and jerboas, and large, browsing mammals which suggest a more forested habitat. The presence of the beaver Anchitheriomys, cyprinid fish and bivalves furthermore showcases the presence of notable amounts of water, while marls suggest that small, alkaline ponds were present during periods of drought. All this indicated that the Tunggur Formation was deposited in a mixed environment of forests and open grasslands, with shallow rivers meandering through the landscape. Other large predators of this locality include the sabertoothed-cat Metailurus and the barbourofelid Albanosmilus, the possibly hyaenid Percrocuta and the wolf-sized Amphicyon tairumensis. The herbivore assemblage includes a large variety of deer, the suids Listriodon and Kubanochoerus, the proboscidean Platybelodon, the bovid Turoceros, the equid Anchitherium, two species of rhinoceros and Chalicotherium.
