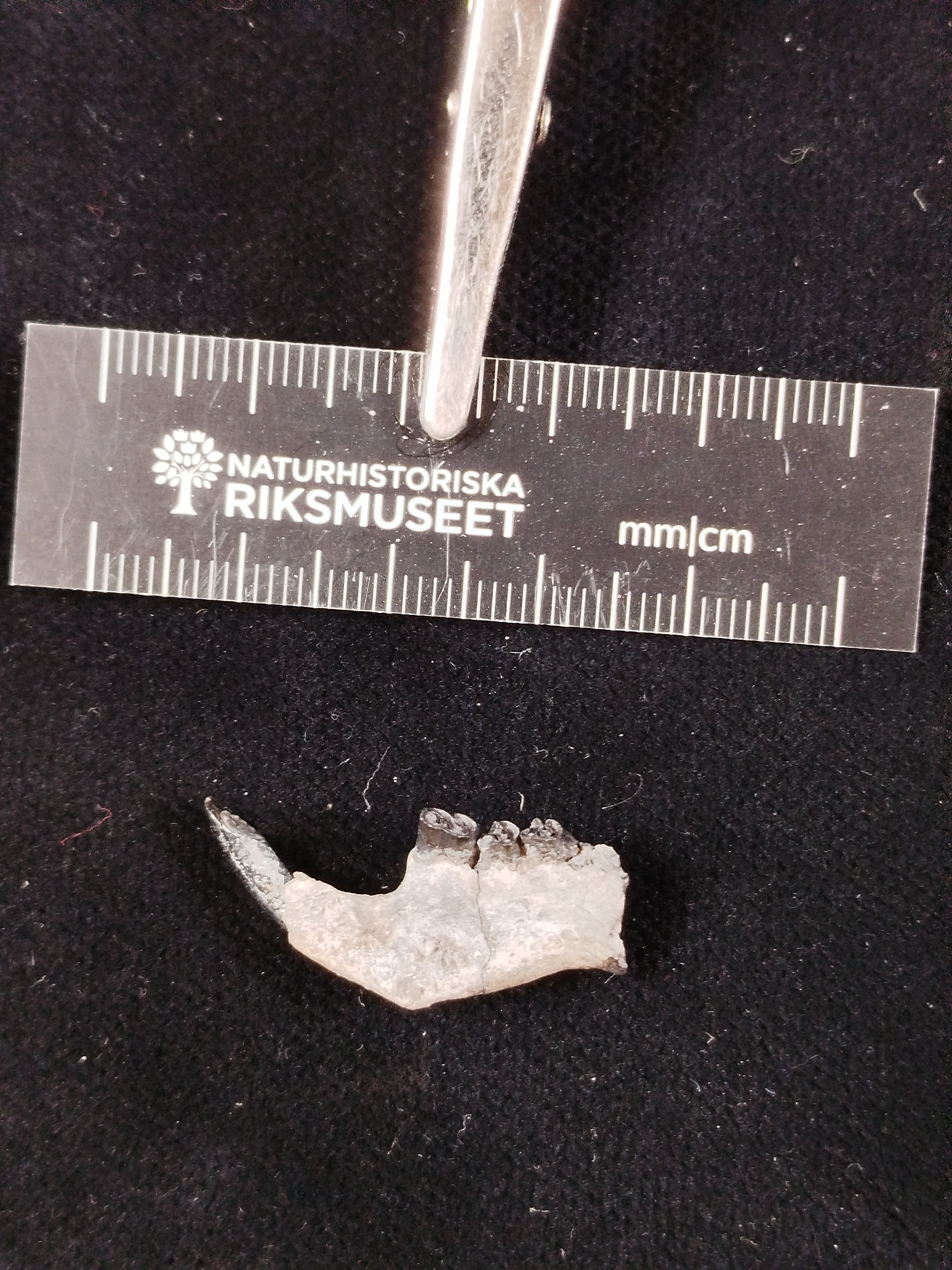
- Mandible of † E. minutus (NRM-PZ M8704), Early Miocene - MN 3, Lignite mine of Povrchový lom Bílina (previously Merkur-North, Czech Republic)

Scientific classification
- Kingdom: Animalia
- Phylum: Chordata
- Class: Mammalia
- Order: Rodentia
- Family: Castoridae
- Subfamily: †Castoroidinae
- Tribe: †Trogontheriini
- Genus: †Euroxenomys; Rädulesco & Samson, 1973

Type species
- † Euroxenomys minutus (Von Meyer, 1838)

Species
- † Euroxenomys inconnexus; † Euroxenomys. minutus; † Euroxenomys nanus; † Euroxenomys wilsoni

= Euroxenomys =

Euroxenomys Temporal range: 23.03–5.33 Ma Early–Late Miocene

Extinct genus of beavers

Euroxenomys is an extinct genus of small-size beavers (Castoridae) that lived around 23 to 5 million years ago during the Miocene (Neogene, Cenozoic). Although most specimens were identified in Central Europe, the genus was known to be widely distributed across other continents like North America and Eastern Asia. At the time, it comprised several species among which Euroxenomys minutus sp., E. inconnexus sp., E. wilsoni sp., and E. nanus sp. can be named.

== Discovery ==
Due to the limited fossil evidence, the taxonomy of Euroxenomys remains uncertain. Von Meyer first described the species minutus as part of the Chalicomys genus in 1838. This identification was based on the dentary structure relative to the morphology of both the lower premolar (p4) and the lower molar (m2).

A century later, Schreuder assigned the species to the Trogontherium genus (mostly known for T. cuvier, the extinct giant beaver) based on minutus enlarged M3 and premolars (P4/p4).

It is only in 1973 that Euroxenomys will get its definitive appellation from Samson and Rädulesco, while being downgraded as a subgenus of Trogontherium. However, recent studies are now leaning towards a new hypothesis placing Euroxenomys as a proper genus morphologically independent from Trogontherium.

== Phylogeny ==
Euroxenomys is part of the Castorids which appeared during the Late Oligocene as Asteneofiber. This stem genus further led to another one, Steneofiber, which later became at the origin of the overall diversification of the family (e.g. Chalicomys and Trogontherium lineages). This radiation essentially took place during the Early Miocene and accounted for up to 30 different genera with different lifestyles and behaviours.

Nowadays, only one genus remains, Castor. It is divided into two subspecies: Castor fiber and C. canadensis. Extinct castorids are usually poorly represented in the fossil record as very little material (mandibular fragments and isolated teeth) has been found so far. There is therefore relatively little evidence of their taxonomy and ecology.

=== Phylogenetic trees based on Rybczynski (2007) ===
- Semi‑aquatic beavers
  - Castorinae (Modern taxa)
  - †Castoroidinae
    - †Euroxenomys (Small-sized beavers)
    - †Castoroides (Large-sized beavers)

- †Castoroidinae
  - - Castoroides
    - - †Euroxenomys
      - †Trogontherium
  - - †Euroxenomys
    - †Trogontherium

== Stratigraphic range & diversification ==
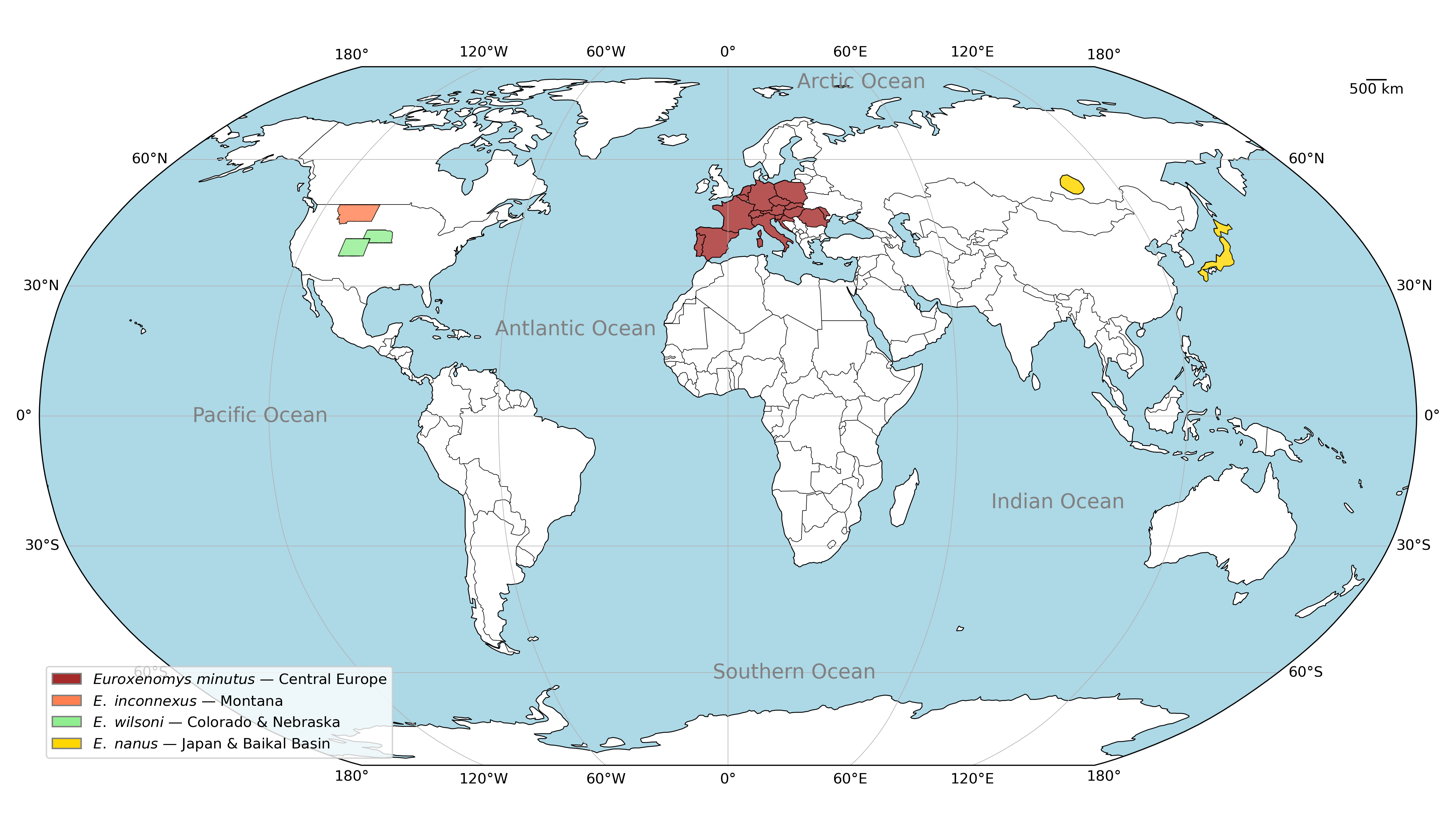
Main fossil evidence of Euroxenomys based on Giersch (2010), Prieto (2014), Mörs (2018), and Mörs (2022).

=== Distribution area ===
Despite very poor evidence of Euroxenomys in the fossil record of Miocene faunas. the genus has been found in various localities across Central Europe (from the Iberic peninsula to Ukraine) and North America (Montana, Colorado & Nebraska).

Recent studies have also identified these small-sized beavers in Eastern Asia, including Siberia and Japan, indicating a wider presence than previously expected.

=== Temporal range ===
The very first evidence of Euroxenomys (FAD) originated back to the Early Miocene, whereas the last appearance (LAD) was dated in the Late Miocene. This relates to different biozones ranging from MN3 to MN13. Although information is lacking to define the precise temporal range as well as the potential demographic trends of the genus, some evidence indicates that Euroxenomys was relatively rare in the Early and early Middle Miocene (MN3 to MN5) but quickly became abundant during the Middle and the Late Miocene (MN6 to MN13).

=== Speciation ===
In terms of diversity, trogontheriine beavers comprised several species which can be divided based on their spatial distribution:

- † Euroxenomys minutus (European taxa)
- † Euroxenomys inconnexus (North America)
- † Euroxenomys wilsoni (North America)
- † Euroxenomys nanus (Asian species)

== Description ==
=== Morphological features ===
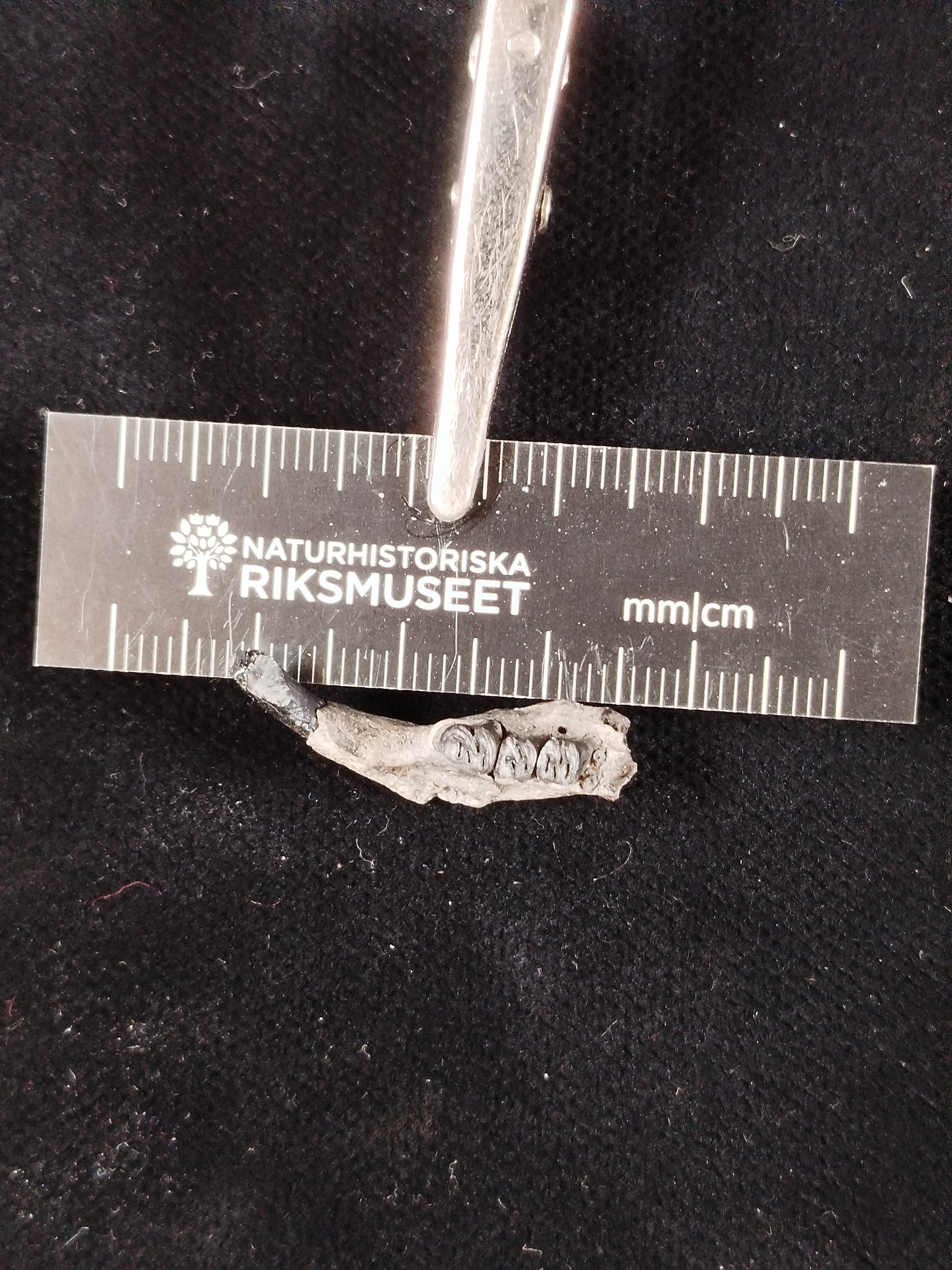
† Euroxenomys minutus (NRM-PZ M8704) - Lower jaw fragment, transversal plane (Lignite mine Merkur-North, Czech Republic - Early Miocene, MN 3)

Euroxenomys was a relatively small-sized castorid probably comparable to common muskrats (Ondatra zibethicus). Unlike present-time beavers, the genus lacked a wide and flattened tail while showing different long-bone proportions. The dentary structure was also specific to the genus and was characterised by an enlarged upper third molar (M3), an elongated lower fourth premolar (p4), and an upper fourth premolar (P4) systematically larger than the upper molars. Just like Trogontherium, Euroxenomys showed a tendency to hypsodonty, with no (or very little) crown cement, combined with the absence of striated enamel in the upper incisors. Some other features like the hypostriid of the lower fourth premolar (p4) are proper to the genus, as they tend to extend down to the crown base.The study by Lechner (2024) contributed additional information on Euroxenomys, based on more than 1,000 new fossil records from the Hammerschmiede site in Southern Germany.

=== Palaeoecology ===
According to its morphological features as well as the fossil sites where the species was found, Euroxenomys may have had a semi-aquatic lifestyle. Although many of the past studies compared the genus to modern Castoridae, the most recent study from Lechner (2024) revealed that the genus was probably more similar to extant muskrats (Ondatra zibethicus). Individuals could therefore be associated with muskrat typical ecology, meaning an early sexual maturity (around 7 months) and a short lifespan (muskrats live for 3 years on average whereas castorids' life expectancy lies between 15 and 25 years). Due to its small size, Euroxenomys was also more likely to be predated, unlike present-day beavers. The presence of corrosive lesions found on some specimens' long bones actually indicated possible signs of predation. Note that these lesions are usually observed on prey bones in predators having an acidic digestive system, such as mammalian carnivores (e.g. red fox or mustelids) and prey birds (either diurnal or nocturnal).

=== Habitat ===
Overall, Euroxenomys typical palaeoenvironment would be defined by permanent and well oxygenated water bodies (e.g. ponds, seasonal streams, rivers alongside of clay-loam soils suitable for their burrows. Wider riparian corridors associated with high depth levels would also represent important criteria to characterise their habitat. It is not excluded that individuals shared a sympatric relationship with large-sized beavers as observed with modern taxa. Based on the fossil evidence and the Eurasian climate during the Miocene epoch, the genus thrived in humid to warm-temperate forestry environments.

== Euroxenomys nanus ==
=== Description ===
Euroxenomys nanus is an extinct species of trogontheriine castorids (Castoroidinae, Castoridae) ranging from the Early Miocene epoch (ca. 18.5 Ma). This taxon has been discovered by Mörs (2018) in Japan (Dota locality, Kani Basin) and represents a key component to understanding the genus diversification. Derived from "nanos", nanus means "dwarf" in Greek.

=== Taxonomy ===
This name is purely based on the species morphology, as E. nanus probably represents the smallest specimen ever found in the Castoridae family. The classification of E. nanus was based on both its small size and its molar morphology. Despite having the same molar patterns as the type species E. minutus, the two taxa differ in body sizes. The same comparison can be mentioned with the genus Eucastor and Euroxenomys wilsoni.
