= Halamagai Formation =

Geological formation in Xinjiang, China

- Stratigraphic range: Early-Middle Miocene; ~16.8–14.36 Ma
- Type: Geological formation
- Underlies: Kekemaideng Formation
- Overlies: Suosuoquan Formation
- Thickness: 37 m

Lithology
- Primary: Sandstone, Gravel
- Other: Mudstone

Location
- Coordinates: 46.57°N 87.78°E
- Region: Xinjiang Province
- Country: China
- Extent: Junggar Basin
- Halamagai Formation (China) Halamagai Formation (Xinjiang)

Halamagai Formation is a geological formation located in the Duolebulejin Terrace on the south bank of the Ulungur River near Kalamagai Township, which lies south of Fuhai County, Xinjiang. The location contains various mammalian fossils of artiodactyls, gomphotheres, perissodactyls, rodents, and primates.

== Fossil content ==
Color key: Taxon / Reclassified taxon / Taxon falsely reported as present / Dubious taxon or junior synonym / Ichnotaxon / Ootaxon / Morphotaxon	Notes; Uncertain or tentative taxa are in small text; ~~crossed out~~ taxa are discredited.

=== Mammals ===
==== Artiodactyls ====
Genus	Species	Locality	Stratigraphic position	Material	Notes	Images
Discokeryx	D. xiezhi			A thick cranium dome skull and neck vertebrae	A domed-skulled prolibytheriid, an early close relative of giraffe and okapi	
Ligeromeryx	L. cf. colberti					
Ligeromeryx	L. praestans					
Ligeromeryx	L. sp					
Turcocerus	T. halamagaiensis			A horn core and dentition	An early caprine bovid	

==== Carnivorans ====
Genus	Species	Locality	Stratigraphic position	Material	Notes	Images
Amphicyon	A. ulungurensis				An amphicyonid	
Gobicyon	G. zhegalloi				An amphicyonid	
Hoplictis	H. baihui	Tieersihabahe	Lower		A mustelid	
Nimravus	N? sp.	Tieersihabahe	Lower	Left ramal fragment	A nimravid feline	
Pseudaelurus	P. cuspidatus	Tieersihabahe	Lower	Partial right ramus	An early felid	
Protictitherium	P. intermedium	Tieersihabahe	Lower	The left and right partial ramus	An early hyena	
Thalassictis	T. chinjiensis		Lower	Partial ramal	An early hyaena	

==== Lagomorphs ====
Genus	Species	Locality	Stratigraphic position	Material	Notes	Images
Alloptox	A. gobiensis					
Sinolagomys	S. sp.					
Plicalagus	P. junggarensis					

==== Erinaceid ====
Genus	Species	Locality	Stratigraphic position	Material	Notes	Images
Mioechinus	M. ? sp.					
Schizogalerix	S. duolebulejinensis					

==== Rodents ====
Genus	Species	County	Stratigraphic position	Material	Notes	Images
Anchitheriomys	A. tungurensis				An early beaver relative	
Atlantoxerus	A. giganteus				An early barbary ground squirrel	
Atlantoxerus	A. junggarensis				An early barbary ground squirrel	
Cricetodon	C. orientalis					
Megacricetodon	M. yei	Tieersihabahe	Lower	A fragmentary right maxilla	A cricetid	
Protalactaga	P. grabaui					
Protalactaga	P. major					
Sinomylagulus	S. halamagaiensis					
Steneofiber	S. depereti				An early beaver relative	

==== Perissodactyls ====
Genus	Species	Locality	Stratigraphic position	Material	Notes	Images
Anchitherium	A. gobiensis				An early horse	
Diaceratherium	A. sp.					
Aceratheriinae Indet.	indeterminate					
Elasmotheriinae Indet.	indeterminate					

==== Primates ====
Genus	Species	Locality	Stratigraphic position	Material	Notes	Images
Pliopithecus	P. bii				A pliopithecid monkey	

==== Proboscidians ====
Genus	Species	Locality	Stratigraphic position	Material	Notes	Images
Choerolophodon	C. sp.					
Gomphotherium	G. connexum					
Gomphotherium	G. mogoliense					
Gomphotherium	G. steinheimense					
Miomastodon	M. cf. tongxinensis					
Parachoerodon	P. rhynchus					
Platybelodon	P. sp.					
Protanancus	P. sp.					
Zygolophodon	Z. cf. turicensis					
