= Propalaeocastor =

Propalaeocastor Temporal range: early Oligocene

Scientific classification
- Domain: Eukaryota
- Kingdom: Animalia
- Phylum: Chordata
- Class: Mammalia
- Order: Rodentia
- Family: Castoridae
- Tribe: †Anchitheriomyini
- Genus: †Propalaeocastor; Borissoglebskaya, 1967

Type species
- †Propalaeocastor kazachstanicus

Species
- †P. butselensis; †P. irtyshensis; †P. kazachstanicus; †P. shevyrevae; †P. zaissanensis

Synonyms
- †Asteneofiber Kretzoi, 1974

Extinct genus of rodents

Propalaeocastor is a poorly known extinct genus of beavers (family Castoridae) from the early Oligocene of Europe and Asia. Recently described material of a new species of Propalaeocastor, P. irtyshensis, indicates the genus is probably the earliest known member of the subfamily Castorinae, which includes all castorids more closely related to living beavers (genus Castor) than to the extinct giant beaver (genus Castoroides). Previously, Propalaeocastor had been allied with more basal beavers such as Agnotocastor and Anchitheriomys. According to Wu and coauthors, Propalaeocastor, specifically P. butselensis, is the likely ancestor of the better-known Eurasian castorine Steneofiber.
