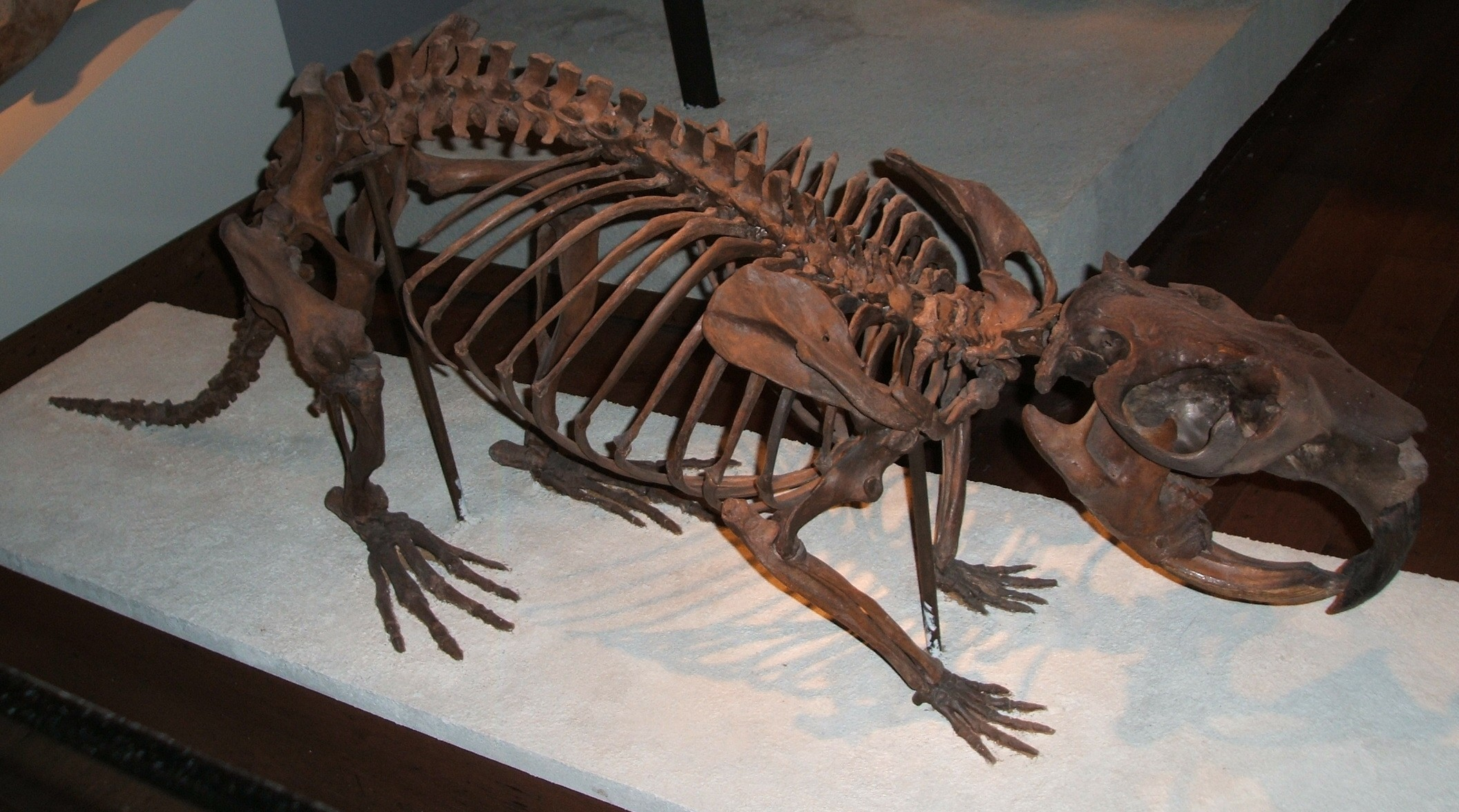
- Castoroides ohioensis specimen at the Field Museum

Scientific classification
- Kingdom: Animalia
- Phylum: Chordata
- Class: Mammalia
- Order: Rodentia
- Family: Castoridae
- Subfamily: †Castoroidinae
- Tribe: †Castoroidini
- Genus: †Castoroides; Foster, 1838

Type species
- †Castoroides ohioensis

Species
- †Castoroides ohioensis; †Castoroides dilophidus

Synonyms
- †Castoroides leiseyorum; †Castoroides nebrascensis Barbour, 1931; †Burosor efforsorius Starrett, 1956

= Castoroides =

Giant beavers Temporal range: Pleistocene, 1.9–0.011 Ma

Extinct genus of beaver

Castoroides (from Latin castor (beaver) and -oides (like)), or the giant beaver, is an extinct genus of enormous, bear-sized beavers that lived in North America during the Pleistocene. Two species are currently recognized, C. dilophidus in the Southeastern United States and C. ohioensis in most of North America. C. leiseyorum was previously described from the Irvingtonian age but is now regarded as an invalid name. All specimens previously described as C. leiseyorum are considered to belong to C. dilophidus.

== Description ==
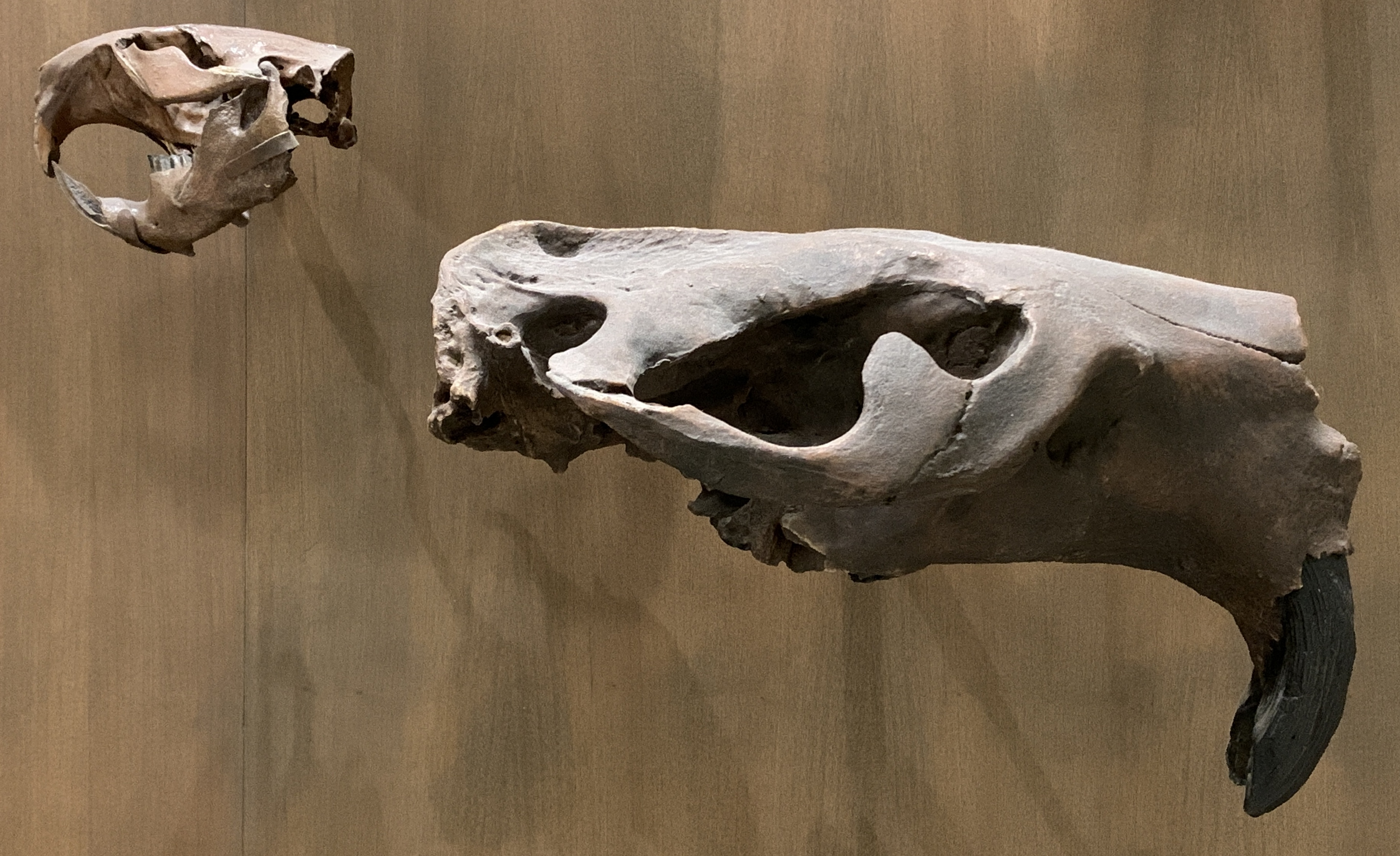
C. ohioensis skull cast (right), compared to a North American beaver skull (left). The former is a cast of a specimen from Shelby County, Iowa. At the AMNH.

Castoroides species were much larger than modern beavers. Their average length was approximately 1.9 m (6.2 ft), and they could grow as large as 2.2 m (7.2 ft). The weight of the giant beaver could vary from 90 kg (198 lb) to 125 kg (276 lb). This makes it the largest known rodent in North America during the Pleistocene and the largest known beaver. Recent analyses suggest that they weighed less, closer to 77 kg (170 lb), but this is disputable.

The hind feet of the giant beaver were much larger than in modern beavers, while the hind legs were shorter. The tail was longer and may not have been paddle-shaped as in modern beavers. It can only be assumed that its feet were webbed as in modern species. The skull structure of the giant beaver suggests that it participated in extended underwater activity, thanks to the ability to take more oxygen into its lungs.

Life restoration of C. dilophidus

One of the defining characteristics of the giant beaver was their incisor teeth, which differed in size and shape from those of modern beavers. Modern beavers have incisors with smooth enamel, while the teeth of the giant beaver had a striated, textured enamel surface. Their teeth were also much larger, up to 15 cm (6 in) long.

== Classification ==
There are two known species:

- Castoroides dilophidus (found in Florida and the southeastern states only)
- Castoroides ohioensis, synonym Castoroides nebrascensis (found throughout continental United States and Canada)

These two species of giant beaver (genus Castoroides) are not close relatives to modern beavers (genus Castor), with modern beavers and Castoroides suggested to have split around 16-20 million years ago based on fossils and genomic estimates. Castoroides typifies the extinct subfamily Castoroidinae, which forms a North American lineage beginning with the Hemingfordian genus Monosaulax, followed by Eucastor, Dipoides, and Procastoroides, to finally culminate and go extinct with Castoroides.

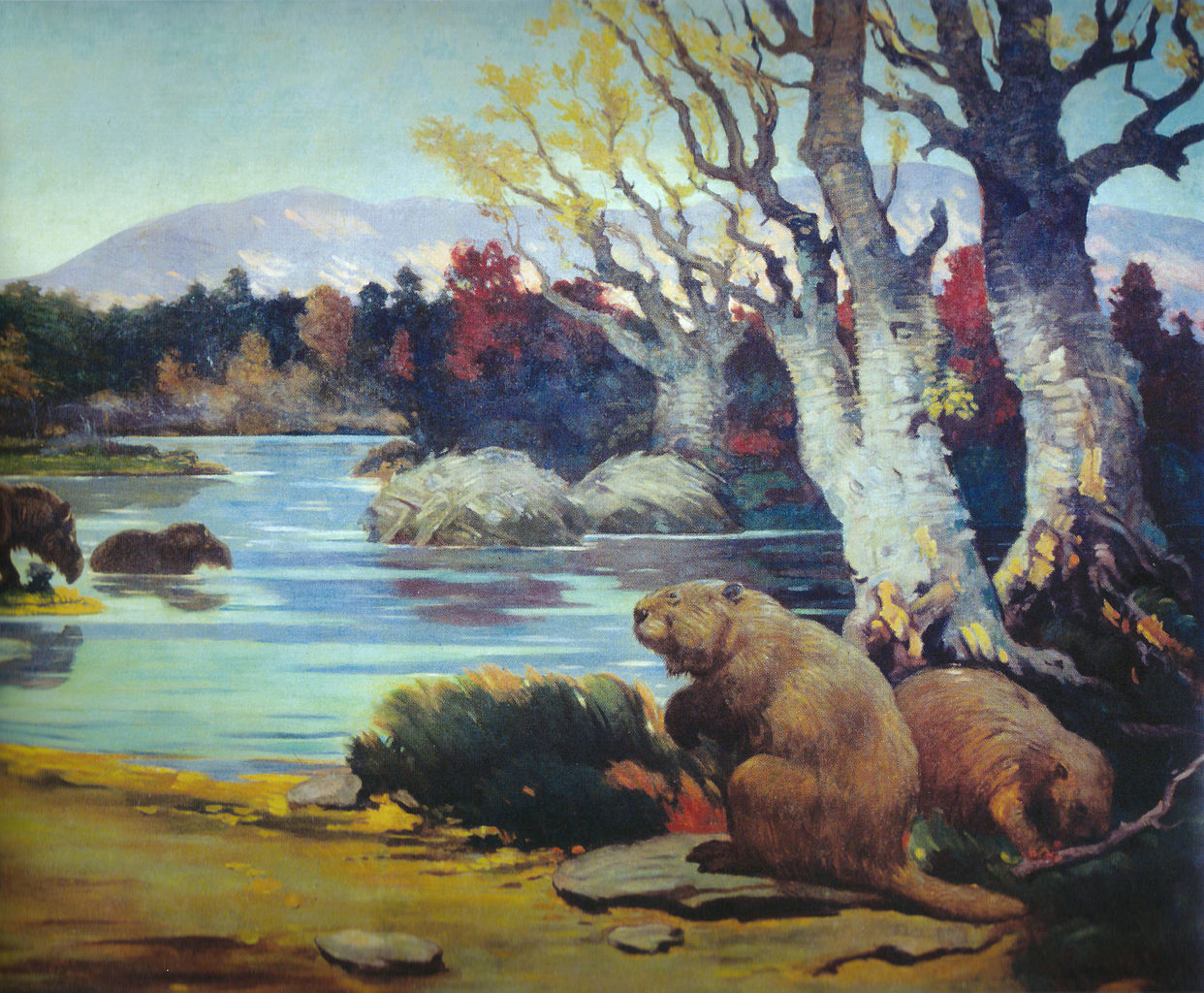
Paleoart by Charles R. Knight, 1904

== Discovery and species ==
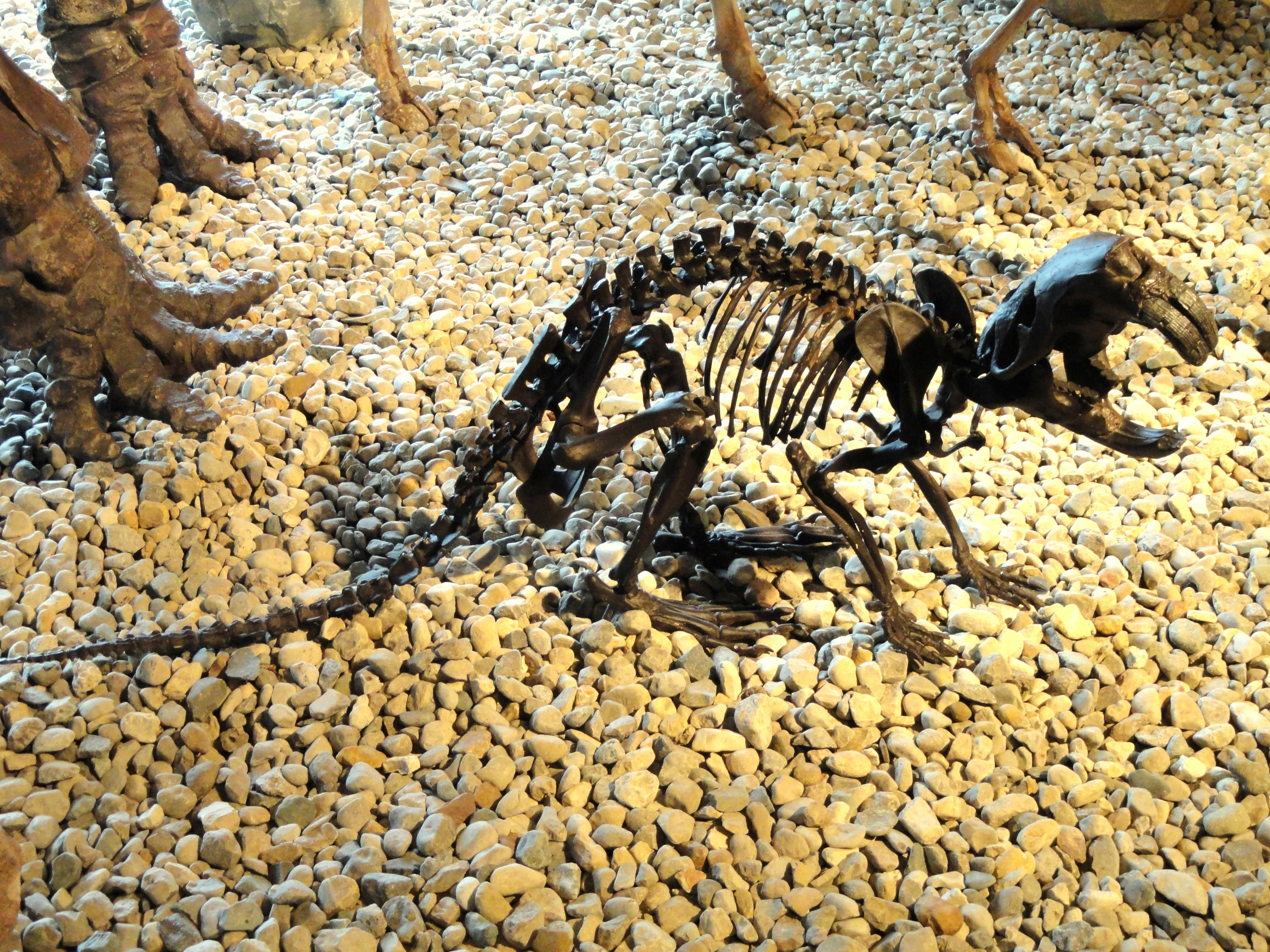
A cast of C. ohioensis assembled from various specimens

Castoroides fossils were first discovered in 1837 in a peat bog in Ohio, hence the species epithet ohioensis. Castoroides had cutting teeth up to 15 cm-long with prominently-ridged outer surfaces. These strong enamel ridges would have acted as girders to support such long teeth. Further, the deep masseteric fossa of the lower jaw suggests a very powerful bite. Remains of the giant beaver, along with Paleo-Indian artifacts and the remains of the flat-headed peccary, giant short-faced bear, and the stag moose were found in the Sheriden Cave in Wyandot County, Ohio.

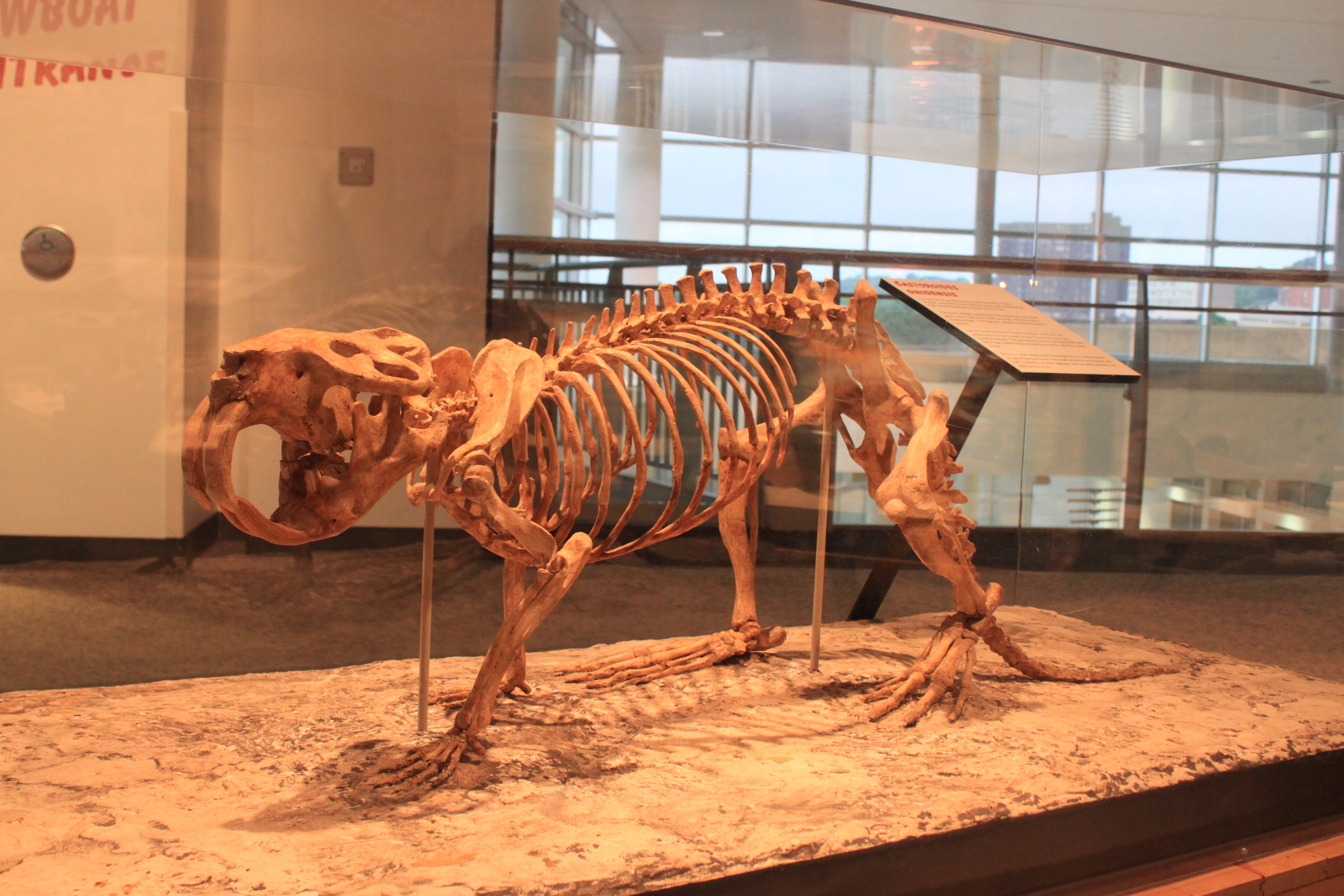
Skeleton in Minnesota Science Museum

Fossils of Castoroides are concentrated around the midwestern United States in states near the Great Lakes, particularly Illinois and Indiana, but specimens are recorded from Alaska and Canada to Florida. In Canada, fossils of this species are commonly found in the Old Crow Basin, Yukon, and single specimens are known from Toronto, Ontario and Indian Island, New Brunswick. A hitherto overlooked 1891 record of a Castoroides skull from near Highgate, Ontario is the earliest for Canada. In Old Crow region, Castoroides fossils occur in deposits of the Sangamonian interglacial.

The discovery of giant beaver remains in New Brunswick adds significantly to the Quaternary terrestrial mammal fauna of New Brunswick and suggests that the terrestrial fauna was probably richer than earlier evidence indicated. The known North American distribution of giant beaver is not significantly changed by this occurrence. Specimens from the southeastern U.S. have been placed in a separate species, Castoroides dilophidus, based on differences in premolar and molar features. Martin (1969) considered it a subspecies, but new research by Hulbert et al. place them in their own species, Castoroides dilophidus. It is recorded from more than 25 Pleistocene localities in Florida, 23 of Rancholabrean age, one possibly of Irvingtonian age, and one of late Blancan age.

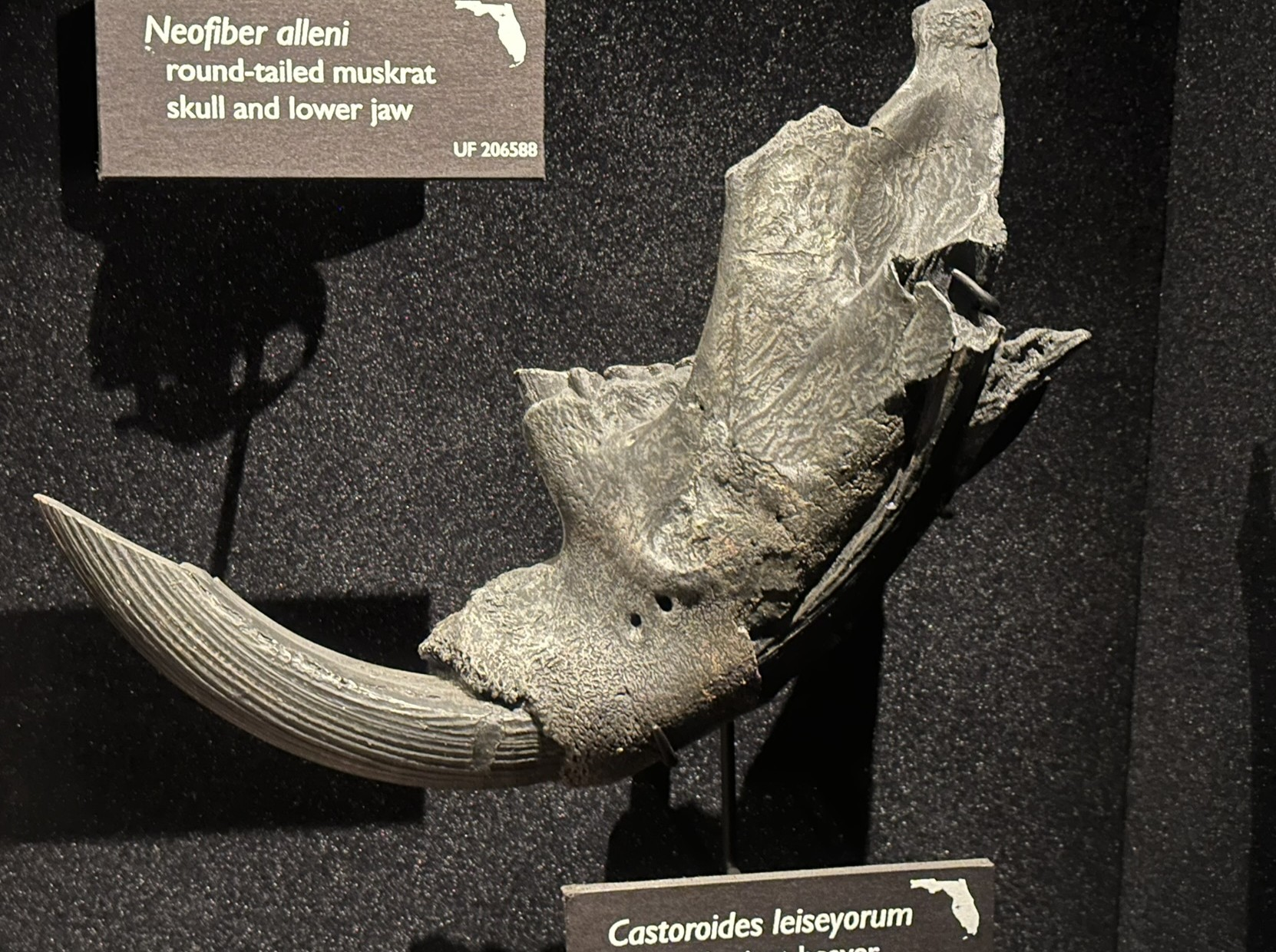
Fossil jaw cast of the southern species C. dilophidus (=C. leisyorum), Florida Museum of Natural History

Castoroides dilophidus specimens have been unearthed in Florida and South Carolina. The Cooper River site in South Carolina was dated at 1.8 million to 11,000 years ago. The Castoroides leiseyorum was named by S. Morgan and J. A. White in 1995 for the Leisey shell pit in Hillsborough County, Florida, with specimens aged at about 2.1 Mya. These specimens are now considered to belong to C. dilophidus, and C. leiseyorum is no longer a valid species name.

== Ecology ==
Stable isotopes suggest that Castoroides probably predominantly consumed submerged aquatic plants, rather than the woody diet of living beavers. There is no evidence that giant beavers constructed dams or lodges. The shape of the incisors of Castoroides would have made it much less effective in cutting down trees than living beavers. It was likely heavily dependent on wetland environments for both food and protection from predators.

== Extinction ==
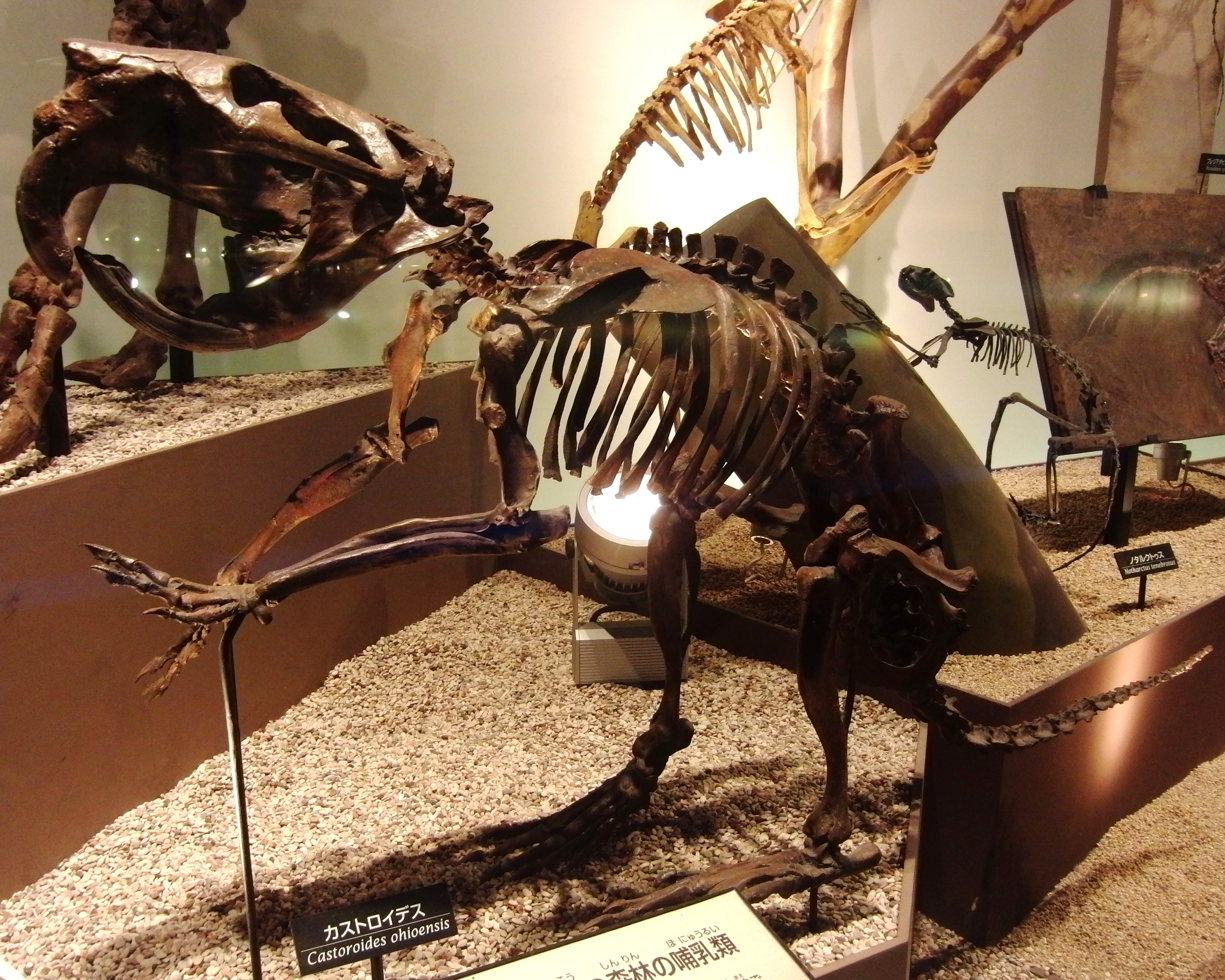
Mounted skeleton in the National Museum of Nature and Science (Tokyo)

Castoroides was likely extirpated from Alaska and the Yukon after 75,000 years ago corresponding to increasingly hostile environmental conditions. Castoroides went extinct during the Late Pleistocene extinctions at the Pleistocene–Holocene transition, alongside most other North American Pleistocene megafauna, such as mammoths and mastodons. This roughly coincides with the development of the Clovis culture in the region—which rapidly appeared in the area by 12,800 years ago—as well the beginning of an aridity trend. It has been long debated if humans ("overkill hypothesis") or climate change had a bigger effect in the extinction event, but they took several thousands of years to completely die out.

The loss of both wetland habitats in lowland regions and associated mixed-conifer forests coincides with regional disappearances of Castoroides populations in North America. Castoroides populations were extirpated from different regions such as the southeast, Great Plains regions, and northern North America (Canada and Alaska) as a direct result of local glacial periods within the Last Glacial Maximum that brought aridification to the habitats and made them unsuitable. Radiocarbon dates from Ohio and New York indicate that the lowlands south of the Great Lakes were home to the last isolated Castoroides populations when it disappeared from eastern North America shortly before the Pleistocene-Holocene transition event, bringing the complete extinction of the genus. The youngest known Castoroides specimens from New York State overlap with human artifacts (dating to 10,150 ± 50 years BP uncalibrated, later estimated to range from 11,501 to 12,050 years BP in calibrated radiocarbon date), suggesting that it overlapped with Paleo-Indian populations for up to a thousand years. There is no zooarchaeological evidence that humans butchered, hunted, or used Castoroides as a resource. The causes of extinction of the Great Lakes Basin population are not specifically known, however competition for habitat space and climate change are among the ideas for what brought about their extinction.

== Interaction with humans ==
Little is known for certain about human interactions with Castoroides. Remains of Castoroides are found along with human artefacts in Sheriden Cave. Differing scientific theories exist considering whether the extinction of Castoroides was caused by human hunting. First Nations such as the Innu and Mississaugas feature giant beaver in their traditional mythology, which some members of these Nations believe is evidence of human interaction with Castoroides.

In 1972, American ethnologist Jane Beck hypothesized C. ohioensis was the basis of an Algonquian myth where a gargantuan beaver created a dam so high on the Saint John River, the lake behind it almost reached the sea. The dam was struck down by the Wabanaki heroic figure Glooscap with his axe, creating the Reversing Falls. Glooscap chased the monster upstream, creating several islands in the river while attempting to strike the beaver through the ice. The beaver constructed another dam, which created the Great Lakes, and fled through these to the land beyond.

Several versions of an Anishinaabe story tell of "giant beavers" who "walked upright and stood as tall as the tallest man." Many scholars believe that stories like these could be evidence from the oral tradition of North American First Nations people encountering C. ohioensis or, at the very least, their fossils.

In 2025, the species Castoroides ohioensis became the official state fossil of Minnesota.

== See also ==
- Trogontherium, a genus of giant beaver from the Pliocene-Late Pleistocene of Eurasia
