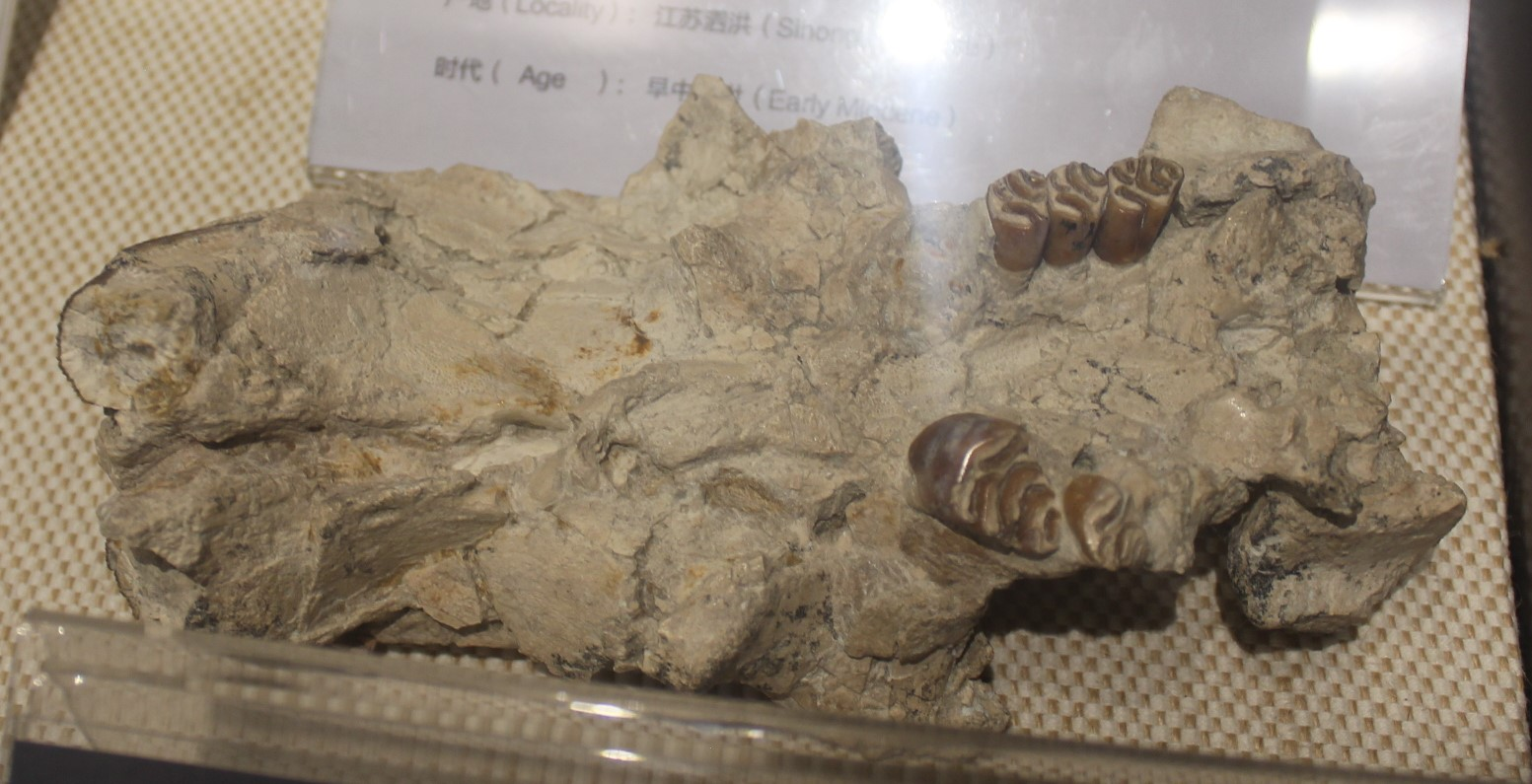
- Holotype (IVPP V793) of Y. sinensis, Paleozoological Museum of China

Scientific classification
- Kingdom: Animalia
- Phylum: Chordata
- Class: Mammalia
- Order: Rodentia
- Family: Castoridae
- Genus: †Youngofiber; Chow & Li, 1978

Species
- †Y. sinensis (Young, 1955)

= Youngofiber =

Extinct genus of rodents

Youngofiber is an extinct genus of beavers from Miocene China and Japan.
