= Migmacastor =

Migmacastor Temporal range: late Oligocene or early Miocene

Scientific classification
- Kingdom: Animalia
- Phylum: Chordata
- Class: Mammalia
- Order: Rodentia
- Family: Castoridae
- Genus: †Migmacastor; Korth & Rybczynski, 2003
- Species: †M. procumbodens

Binomial name
- †Migmacastor procumbodens Korth & Rybczynski, 2003

Extinct genus of rodents

Migmacastor is an extinct member of the beaver family, Castoridae, known from a single species, Migmacastor procumbodens. Only a single specimen has been reported, a skull from the late Oligocene or early Miocene of Nebraska. Features of the incisor teeth of Migmacastor indicate they were used to dig. Other extinct beavers, including the better-known Palaeocastor, were also fossorial (digging), but Migmacastor may have become a burrower independently.
