= Monosaulax =

Scientific classification
- Domain: Eukaryota
- Kingdom: Animalia
- Phylum: Chordata
- Class: Mammalia
- Order: Rodentia
- Family: Castoridae
- Tribe: †Castoroidini
- Genus: †Monosaulax; Stirton, 1935

Extinct genus of rodents

Monosaulax is an extinct genus of beaver-grouped rodents. It is sometimes treated as a synonym of Eucastor (McKenna and Bell, 1997).
