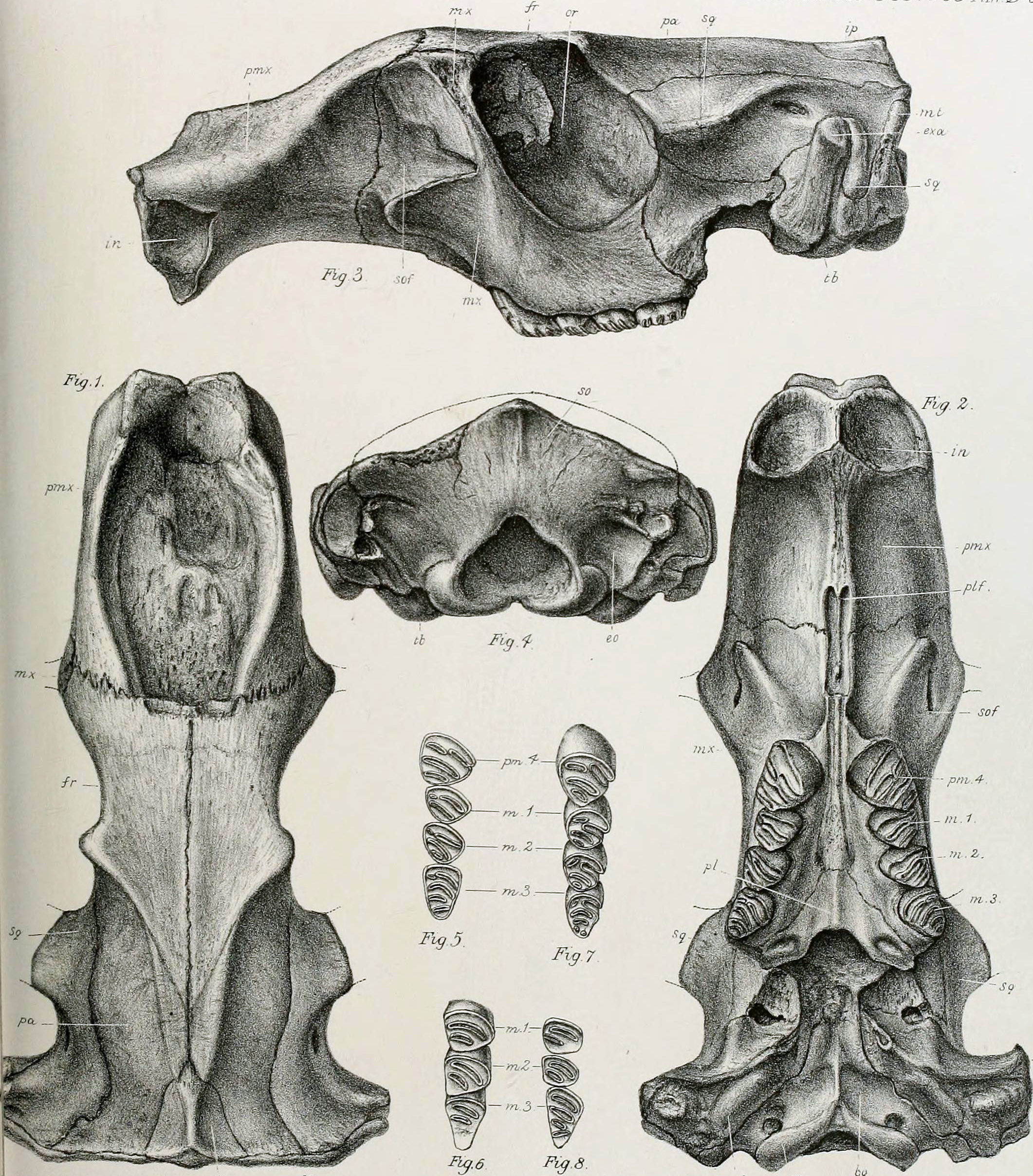
- Skull Trogontherium cuvieri, missing the zygomatic arch and front incisors

Scientific classification
- Kingdom: Animalia
- Phylum: Chordata
- Class: Mammalia
- Order: Rodentia
- Family: Castoridae
- Tribe: †Trogontheriini
- Genus: †Trogontherium; Fischer, 1809

Type species
- †Trogontherium cuvieri Fischer, 1814

Other species
- T. minus Newton, 1890

= Trogontherium =

Trogontherium Temporal range: Late Pliocene–Late Pleistocene

Extinct genus of giant beaver

Trogontherium is an extinct genus of Eurasian giant beavers that lived from the Late Pliocene to the Late Pleistocene. Fossils of Trogontherium have been found across northern Eurasia, from Western Europe to China and Siberia.

== Taxonomy ==
Trogontherium was originally described in 1809 from a skull given to Gotthelf Fischer von Waldheim from the collection of Russian aristocrat Alexander Sergeyevich Stroganov found near Taganrog on the coast of the Sea of Azov in southern Russia, suggested to be Early Pleistocene in age. Originally, no species name was given. In 1823, Georges Cuvier cited the type species name as being T. cuvieri, attributing the species name to von Waldheim, which has been followed by later authors. Although the origin of the name was previously obscure, a 2024 study confirmed that the species name T. cuvieri was first used in a previously overlooked 1814 publication by von Waldheim. Cuvier had previously named the species Castor trogontherium in an 1809 publication, which is recognised as a synonym of Trogontherium cuvieri but because C. trogontherium was last used in 1884, it is considered a nomen oblitum, and thus T. cuvieri remains the valid name for the species. T. cuvieri is known from the Late Pliocene to Pleistocene of Eurasia. A distinctly smaller species, T. minus, named by Edwin Tulley Newton in 1890, is known from the Late Pliocene-earliest Pleistocene of Europe, where it co-existed with T. cuvieri. T. boisvilletti is generally considered a synonym of T. cuiveri. Some authors also include the species T. minutus from the Late Miocene of Europe, though this species has also been included in the genera Steneofiber or Euroxenomys, although it is clearly closely related to Trogontherium. Trogontherium has been placed as part of the subfamily Castoroidinae, which notably also includes North American giant beavers (Castoroides), though the large body size seems to have developed independently in both lineages.

== Description ==
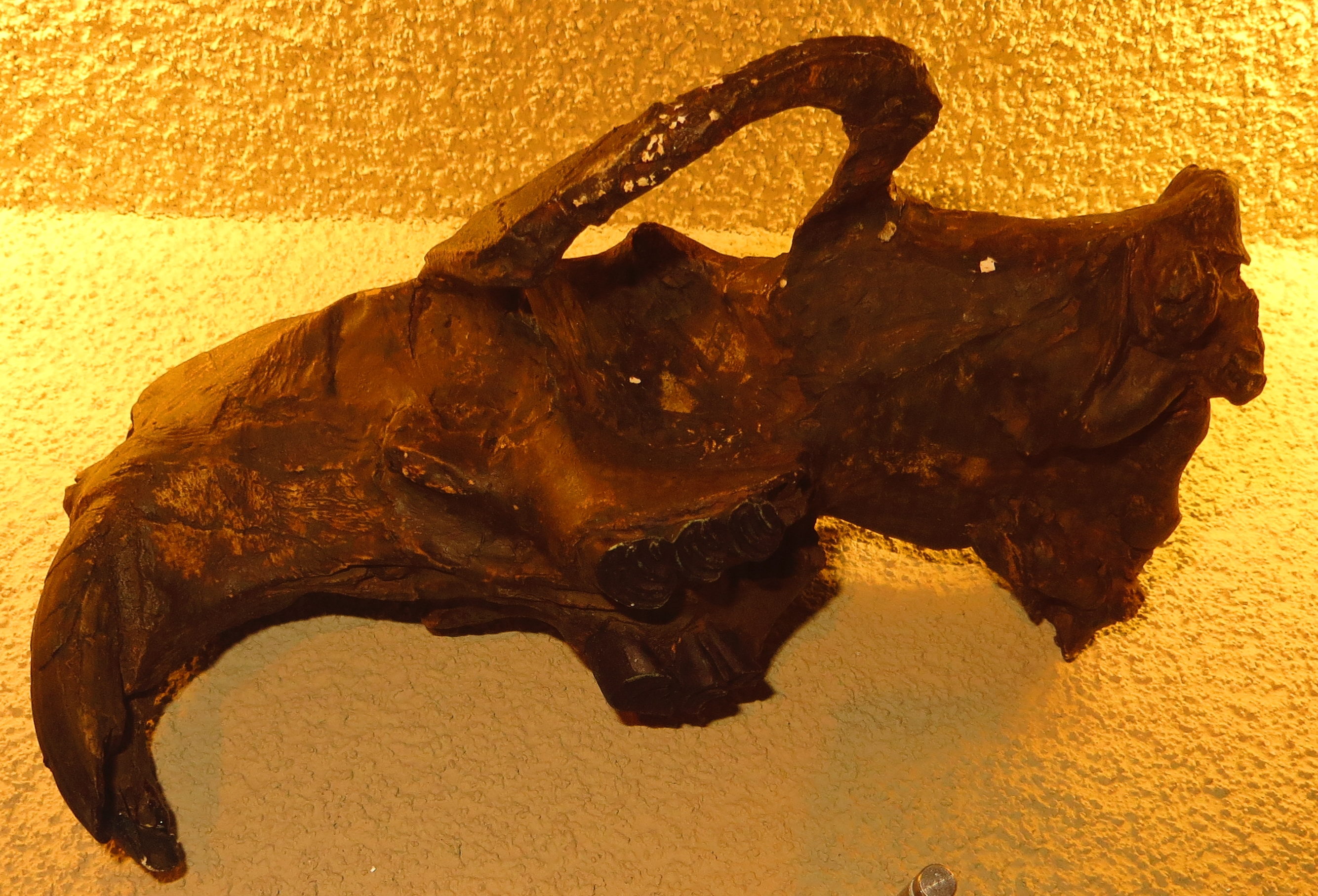
Skull of Trogontherium viewed from below

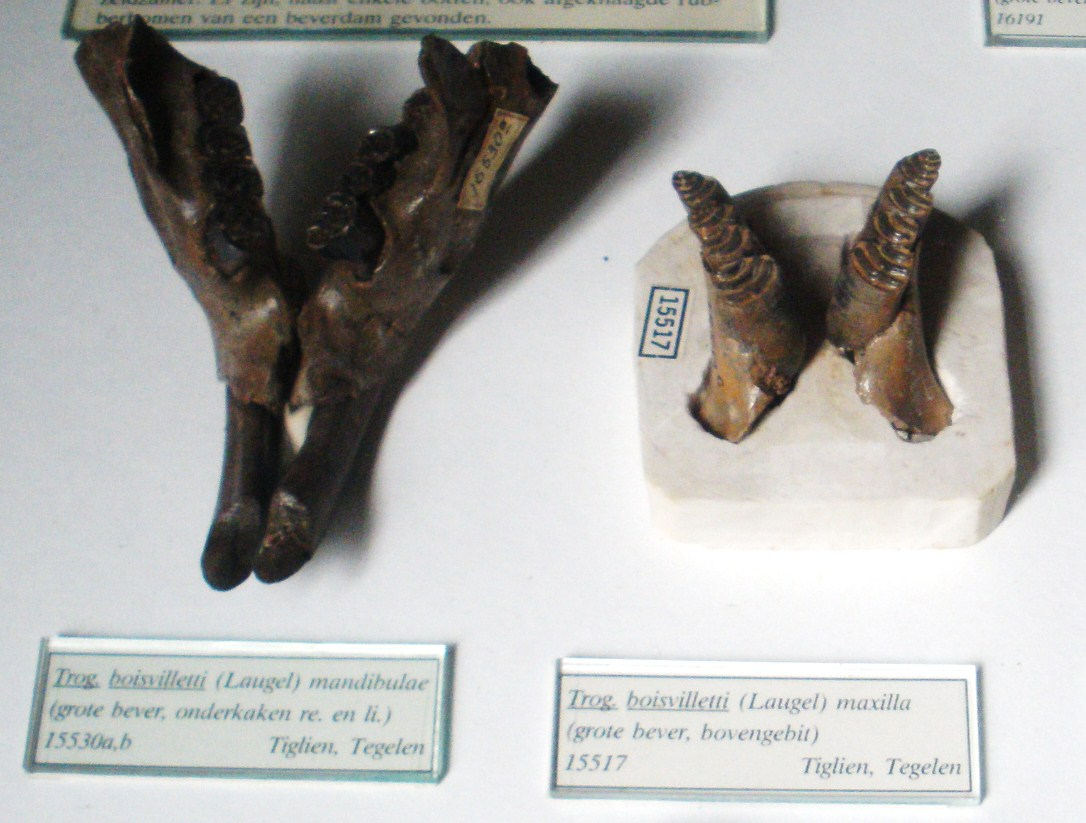
Lower jaw (left) and teeth from upper jaw (right)

Trogontherium cuvieri grew larger than living beavers (Castor), with a skull up to 21 centimetres (8.3 in) in length, but was smaller than Castoroides. The incisors are covered in fine longitudinal grooves, and have a convex enamel face. The cheek teeth are high crowned. The sagittal suture of the skull is flanked by two deep depressions. The skull roof is largely flat, and the skull is overall much more robust and massive than that of modern beavers. Compared to Castor, the humerus and femur of T. cuiveri are proportionally shorter, but the radius, ulna, tibia and fibula bones are proportionally longer. The metatarsal bones and phalanges of the hindlimb were longer, more slender and narrower than in Castor, suggesting that the feet did not have well-developed webbing. The ankle joint had a limited calcaneo-fibular connection, unknown in any other rodent, but comparable to those in lagomorphs and ungulates, which served to stabilise the ankle joint.

== Ecology ==
Trogontherium is thought to have engaged in gnawing like modern beavers, though its convex incisors would have made it less effective at gnawing through hard vegetation than the flattened incisors of living Castor, and would have functioned more like a gouge than a chisel. It may have fed by gnawing on bark and lignified roots. Dental microwear analysis of teeth of T. cuvieri from China, spanning the Pleistocene, suggest that it was ecologically plastic, and able to adapt its diet to local conditions. T. cuvieri is suggested to have occupied a different, more terrestrial niche than living Castor, as suggested by its more cursorially (running) adapted limbs, though it appears to have been closely associated with aquatic environments. At the Bilzingsleben site in Germany, dating to around 400–300,000 years ago, T. cuvieri is suggested to have been hunted by archaic humans, though it is much rarer at the site than remains of Castor.

== Evolution and extinction ==
Trogontherium first appeared in Europe during the Pliocene, with the species T. cuvieri dispersing over to East Asia and Siberia at the Pliocene-Pleistocene boundary, around 2.6 million years ago. T. cuvieri became extinct in Europe in the late Middle Pleistocene, during the Saalian glaciation (~300-125,000 years ago). The last record of the species is from the Late Pleistocene of Manchuria near Harbin in Northeast China, around 40,000 years old. Its disappearance might be related to the arrival of hunter gatherers into the region.
