= Chalicomys =

Chalicomys Temporal range: Miocene

Scientific classification
- Kingdom: Animalia
- Phylum: Chordata
- Class: Mammalia
- Order: Rodentia
- Family: Castoridae
- Genus: †Chalicomys; Kaup, 1832
- Species: †C. jaegeri

Binomial name
- †Chalicomys jaegeri Kaup, 1832

Extinct genus of castorid rodent

Chalicomys is an extinct genus of castorid rodent that lived during the Miocene epoch. Its fossils have been found in Europe, from Spain to Poland. It might have also been present in Pliocene of Sivalik Hills, Indian subcontinent based on the material referred to Palaeomys sp. from Saketi beds of Himachal Pradesh.

== Description ==
The mandibular fourth premolar of Chalicomys jaegeri is characterised by all flexids being orientated diagonally on the occlusal surface, with a paraflexid that is slightly longer than the metaflexid and that opens mesially and lingually. On the maxillary fourth premolar, the parafossette has the shape of a hook and is partially parallel to the hypoflexus on the occlusal surface.
