= Haplocyonoides =

Haplocyonoides Temporal range: 20–16.9 Ma Early Miocene

Scientific classification
- Kingdom: Animalia
- Phylum: Chordata
- Class: Mammalia
- Infraclass: Placentalia
- Order: Carnivora
- Family: †Amphicyonidae
- Genus: †Haplocyonoides; Hürzeler (1940)

Species
- Haplocyonoides mordax; Haplocyonoides serbiae; Haplocyonoides ponticus

Extinct genus of carnivores

Haplocyonoides is an extinct genus of terrestrial carnivores belonging to the suborder Caniformia, family Amphicyonidae ("bear dog"), and which inhabited Europe from the Early Miocene subepoch (20 Mya)—(16.9 Mya). Haplocyonoides existed for approximately 3.1 million years.

Haplocyonoides was named by Hürzeler (1940) and was assigned to Amphicyonidae by Carroll (1988).

== Fossil distribution ==
One site in Les Beilleaux, France.
