= Procastoroides =

Procastoroides Temporal range: Early to Late Pliocene

Scientific classification
- Domain: Eukaryota
- Kingdom: Animalia
- Phylum: Chordata
- Class: Mammalia
- Order: Rodentia
- Family: Castoridae
- Subfamily: †Castoroidinae
- Tribe: †Castoroidini
- Genus: †Procastoroides; Barbour & Schultz, 1937

Extinct genus of rodents

Procastoroides is an extinct genus of beaver-grouped rodents.
