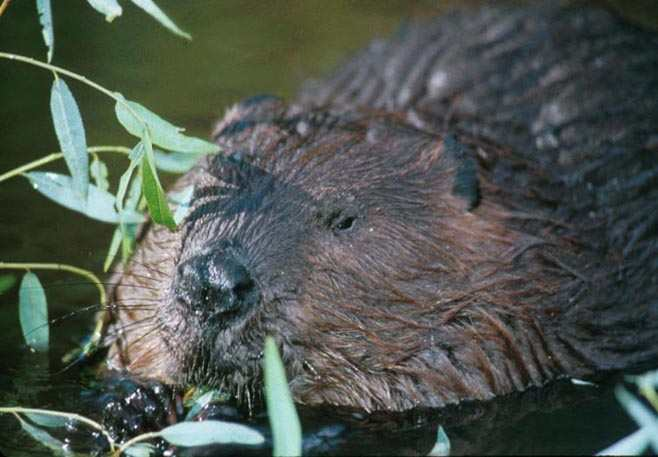
- North American beaver, Castor canadensis

Scientific classification
- Domain: Eukaryota
- Kingdom: Animalia
- Phylum: Chordata
- Class: Mammalia
- Order: Rodentia
- Superfamily: Castoroidea
- Family: Castoridae; Hemprich, 1820

Type genus
- Castor Linnaeus, 1758

Genera
- See text

= Castoridae =

Castoridae Temporal range: Late Eocene–Recent

Family of mammals

Castoridae is a family of rodents that contains the two living species of beavers and their fossil relatives. A formerly diverse group, only a single genus is extant today, Castor. Two other genera of "giant beavers", Castoroides and Trogontherium, became extinct in the Late Pleistocene.

== Characteristics ==
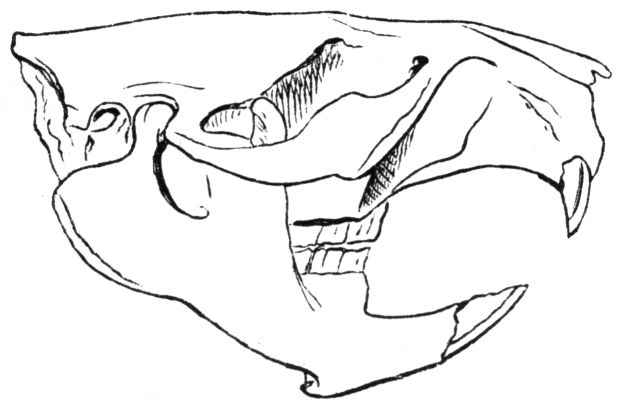
Skull of a beaver

Castorids are medium-sized mammals, although large compared with most other rodents. They are semiaquatic, with sleek bodies and webbed hind feet, and are more agile in the water than on land. Their tails are flattened and scaly, adaptations that help them manoeuvre in the water. Castorids live in small family groups that each occupy a specific territory, based around a lodge and dam constructed from sticks and mud. They are herbivores, feeding on leaves and grasses in the summer, and woody plants such as willow in the winter. They have powerful incisors and the typical rodent dental formula:

Dentition
1.0.1-2.3
1.0.1.3

== Evolution ==
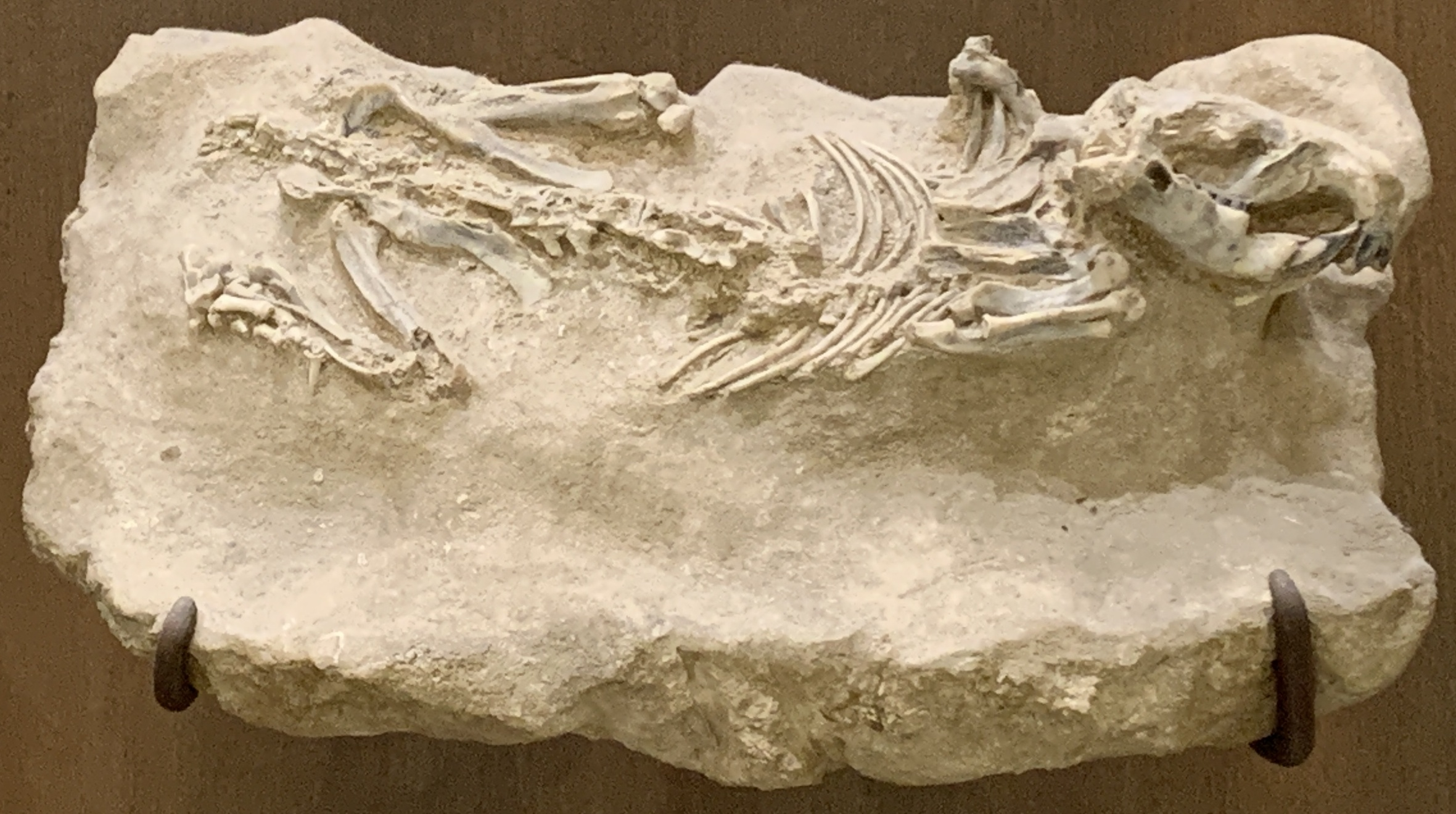
Euhapsis barbouri, collected in Wyoming. At the AMNH.

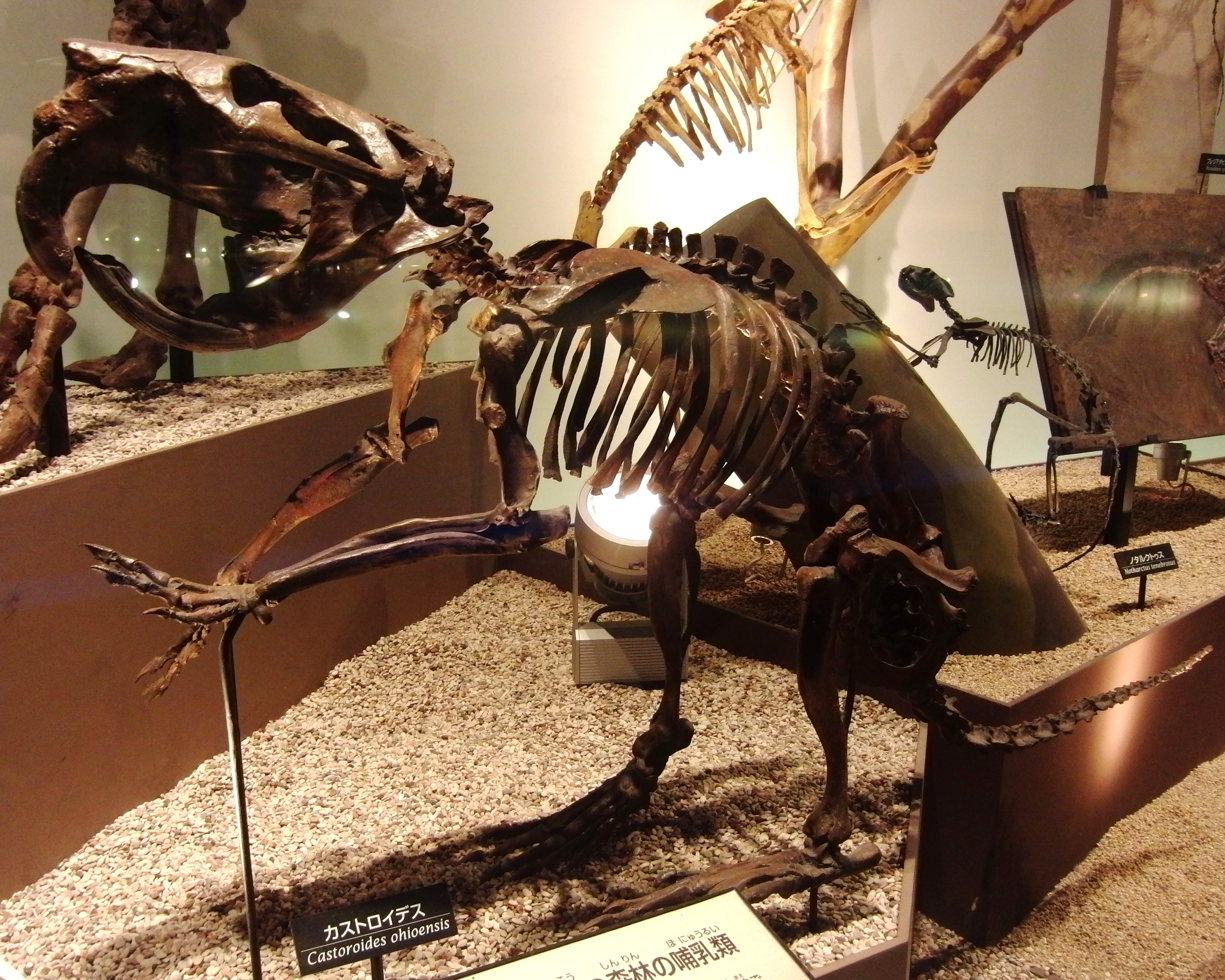
Castoroides ohioensis

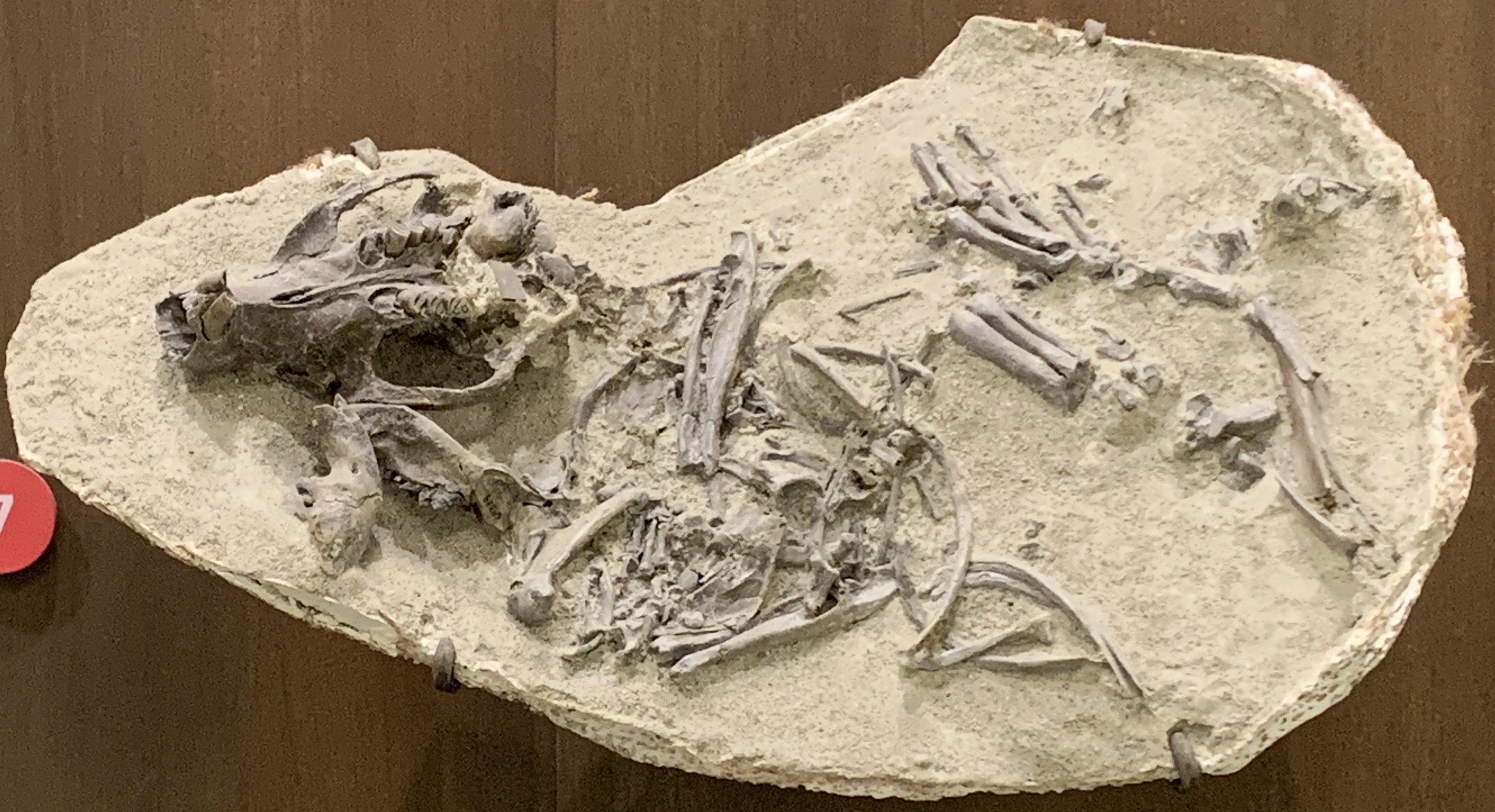
Eucastor tortus, collected from Cherry County, Nebraska. At the AMNH.

The earliest castorids belong to the genus Agnotocastor, known from the late Eocene and Oligocene of North America and Asia. Other early castorids included genera such as Steneofiber, from the Oligocene and Miocene of Europe, the earliest member of the subfamily Castorinae, which contains castorids closely related to living beavers. Their teeth were not well suited to gnawing wood, suggesting this habit evolved at a later point, but they do appear adapted to semiaquatic living. Later, such early species evolved into forms such as Palaeocastor from the Miocene of Nebraska. Palaeocastor was about the size of a muskrat, and dug corkscrew-shaped burrows up to 2.5 m (8.2 ft) deep.

Giant forms evolved in the Pleistocene, including Trogontherium in Europe, and Castoroides in North America. The latter animal was as large as a black bear, yet had a brain only marginally larger than that of modern beavers. Its shape suggests it would have been a good swimmer, and it probably lived in swampy habitats.

== Taxonomy ==
McKenna and Bell divided Castoridae into two subfamilies, Castoroidinae and Castorinae. More recent studies have recognized two additional subfamilies of basal castorids, Agnotocastorinae and Palaeocastorinae, which is followed here. Within the family, Castorinae and Castoroidinae are sister taxa; they share a more recent common ancestor with each other than with members of the other two subfamilies. Both subfamilies include semiaquatic species capable of constructing dams. The Palaeocastorinae include beavers that are interpreted as fossorial (burrowing), as are nothodipoidins and Migmacastor. The following taxonomy is based on Korth and Rybczynski, with preference given to the latter where these differ.

- Family Castoridae
  - †Migmacastor
  - Subfamily †Agnotocastorinae (paraphyletic)
    - Tribe †Agnotocastorini
      - †Agnotocastor
      - †Neatocastor
    - Tribe †Anchitheriomyini
      - †Anchitheriomys
      - †Propalaeocastor
      - †Oligotheriomys
  - Subfamily †Palaeocastorinae
    - †Palaeocastor
    - †Capacikala
    - †Pseudopalaeocastor
    - Tribe †Euhapsini
      - †Euhapsis
      - †Fossorcastor
  - Subfamily †Castoroidinae
    - †Priusaulax (placement in Castoroidinae questionable)
    - Tribe †Nothodipoidini
      - †Eucastor
      - †Microdipoides
      - †Nothodipoides
    - Tribe †Castoroidini (paraphyletic)
      - †Monosaulax
      - †Prodipoides
      - †Dipoides
      - †Castoroides
      - †Procastoroides
    - Tribe †Trogontheriini
      - †Trogontherium
      - †Boreofiber
      - †Euroxenomys
      - †Youngofiber
      - †Asiacastor
  - Subfamily Castorinae
    - †Chalicomys (also incorrectly "Palaeomys")
    - †Steneofiber
    - †Zamolxifiber
    - †Romanofiber
    - †Schreuderia
    - †Sinocastor
    - †Hystricops
    - Castor - modern beavers
      - North American beaver, Castor canadensis
      - Eurasian beaver, Castor fiber
      - †Castor californicus
