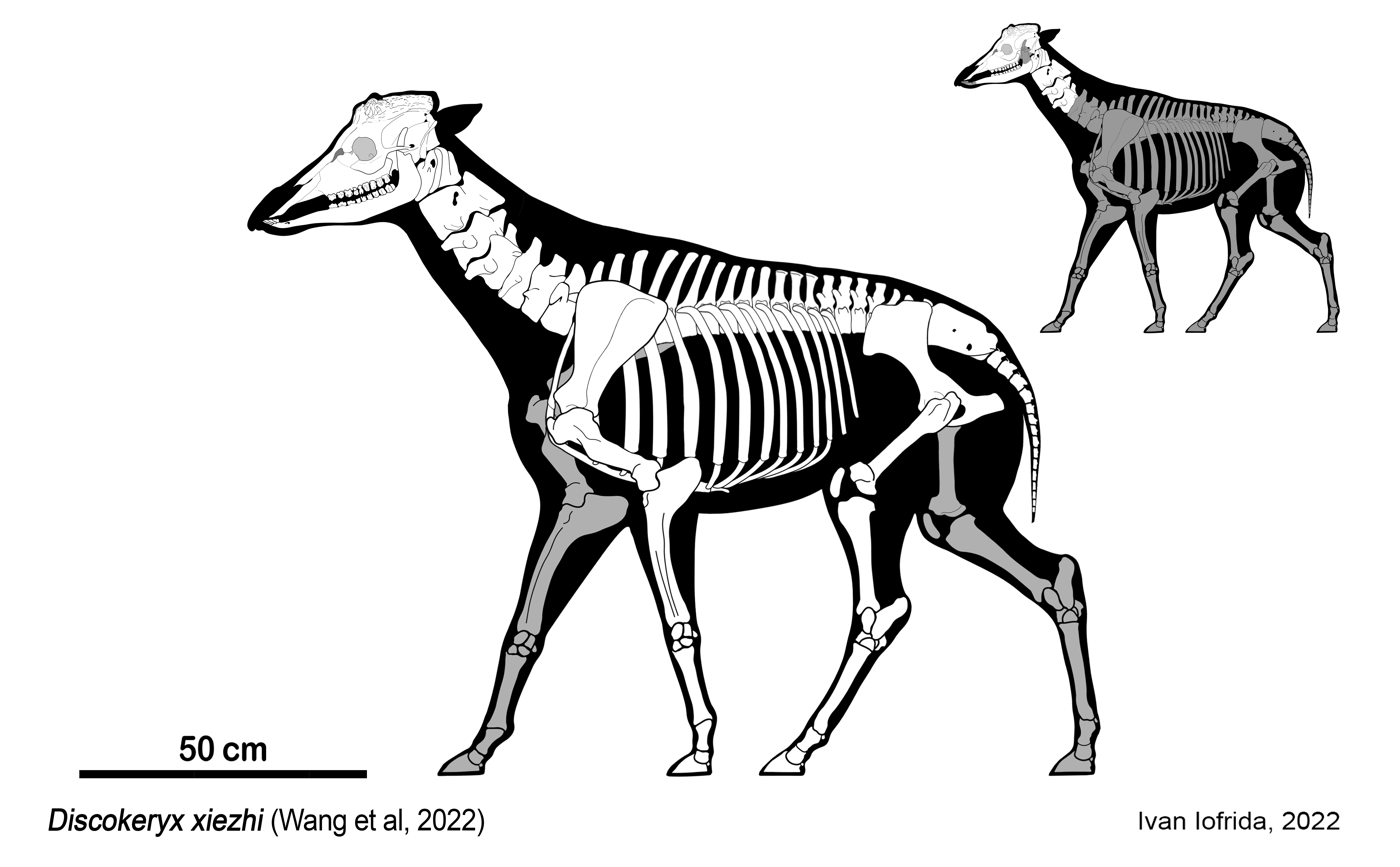
- Skeletal reconstruction

Scientific classification
- Kingdom: Animalia
- Phylum: Chordata
- Class: Mammalia
- Order: Artiodactyla
- Family: †Prolibytheriidae
- Genus: †Discokeryx; Wang et al, 2022

Type species
- Discokeryx xiezhi Wang et al, 2022

= Discokeryx =

Discokeryx Temporal range: Early Miocene ~17-16.9 Ma

Genus of extinct artiodactyl mammals from the early Miocene

Discokeryx is an extinct genus of even-toed ungulates, possibly related to the modern giraffe and okapi. D. xiezhi was alive during the Early Miocene period 17–16.9 million years ago. Fossilized remains of this animal were discovered in the Halamagai Formation located in northwest China. This species is known for their thick skulls and stumpy necks used for fighting other male D. xiezhi.

== Description ==
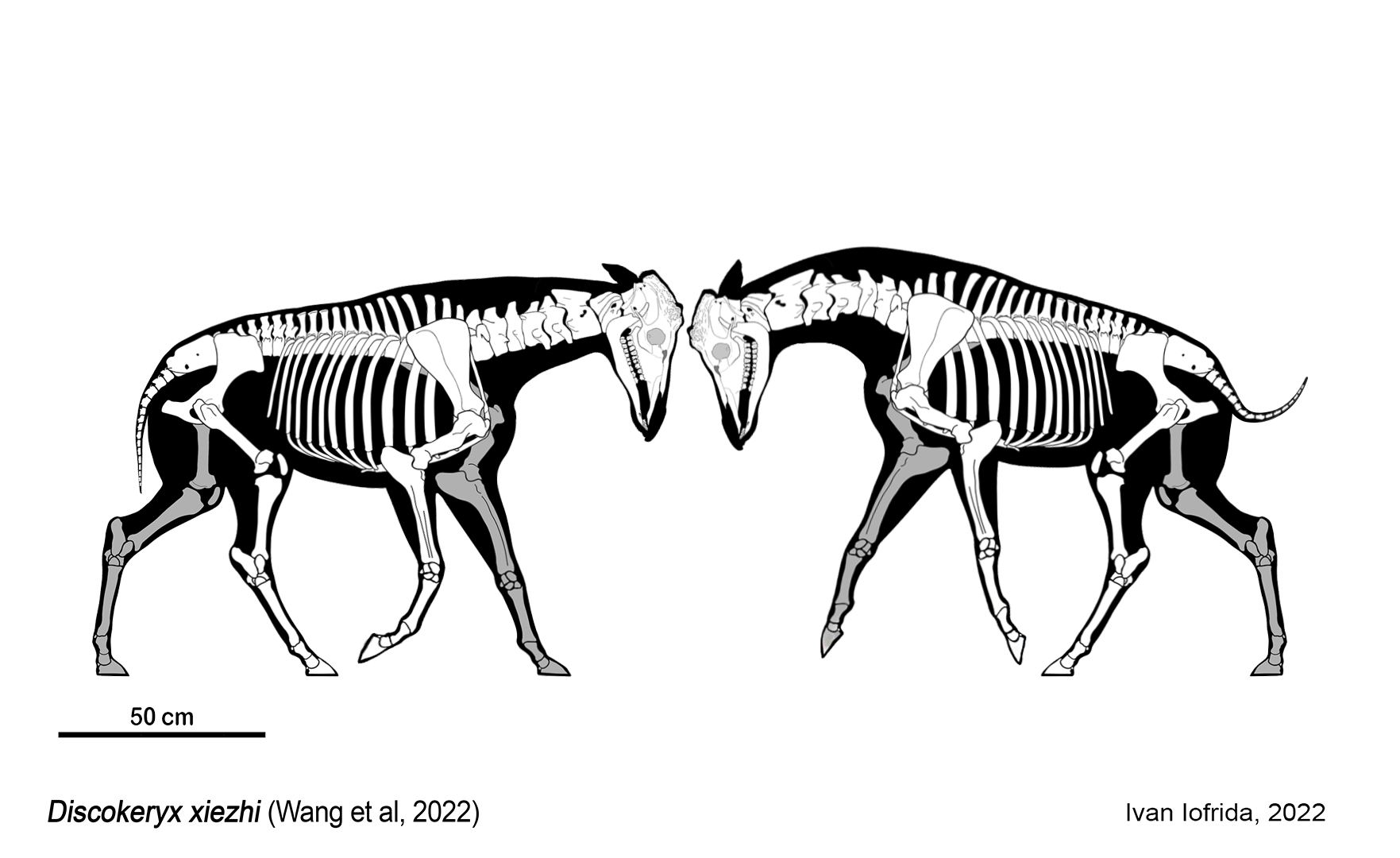
Skeletal reconstructions of two Discokeryx individuals engaged in hypothetical head-butting behavior

Discokeryx had a thick-boned cranium which had disk-shaped headgear located in the middle of the head, cervical vertebrae with thickened centra, and the most complicated head-neck joints in any mammal known at the time of its discovery in 2022. These adaptations were for head-butting behavior between males, comparable to the behaviors of rams and musk-oxen as well as the neck-blowing in modern male giraffes. The neck adaptations of Discokeryx help scientists to better understand the triggers for the evolution of the necks of giraffoids.

Compared to extant head-butting animals such as rams and musk-oxen, D. xiezhi had the most optimized head-butting adaptations of all, with a skull that protected the brain more efficiently than other head-butting mammals. Tooth enamel isotopes indicate that the species was an open-land grazer which drank from multiple sources of water, and that their habitats included areas that other contemporary mammals were not adapted to make use of like D. xiezhi could.

== Etymology ==
The name of the type species and only species, Discokeryx xiezhi, was named after the Xiezhi, which is a Chinese mythical creature with one horn. The name of the genus translates to "round-plated horn" in English.
