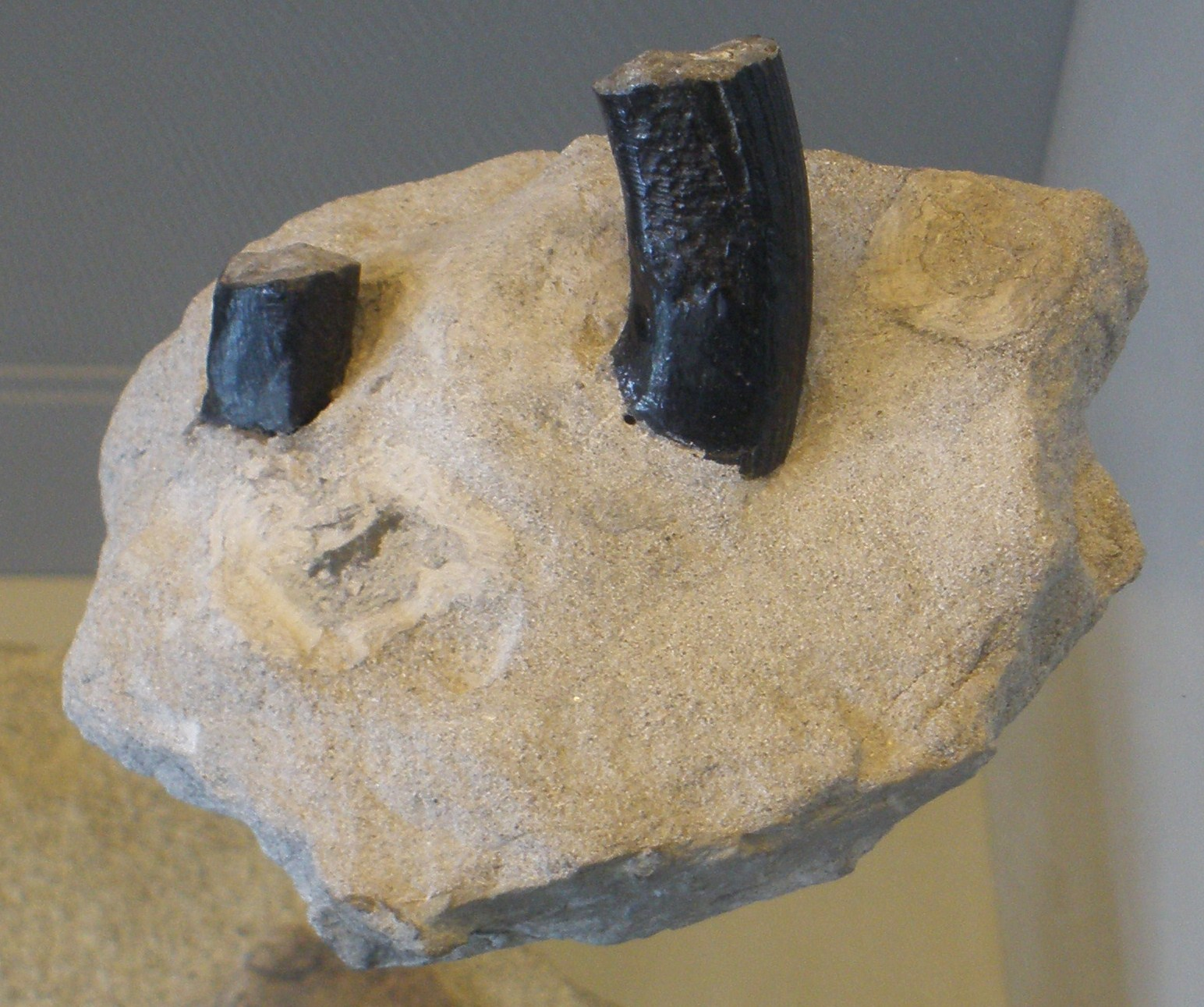
- Fossil

Scientific classification
- Kingdom: Animalia
- Phylum: Chordata
- Class: Mammalia
- Infraclass: Placentalia
- Order: Rodentia
- Family: Castoridae
- Tribe: †Anchitheriomyini
- Genus: †Anchitheriomys; Roger, 1898

Type species
- †Hystrix wiedemanni Roger, 1885 (Junior synonym of A. suevicus)

Species
- †A. buceei May and Brown, 2023; †A. fluminis; †A. nanus; †A. senrudi; †A. stouti; †A. suevicus (Schlosser, 1884); †A. tungurensis

Synonyms
- Amblycastor Matthew, 1918

= Anchitheriomys =

Anchitheriomys Temporal range: early Oligocene to middle Miocene

Extinct genus of rodents

Anchitheriomys is an extinct member of the beaver family, Castoridae. It inhabited North America and Eurasia during the middle Miocene. The name of the genus comes from Anchitherium, an extinct genus of horses, and the Greek word for mouse, μῦς (mys), thus meaning "Anchitherium's mouse", because the fossils of both genera usually co-occur.

Until recently, Anchitheriomys was placed in a closely related family of rodents, the Eutypomyidae, but a partial skull shows similarities to another early beaver, Agnotocastor.
