= Agnotocastor =

Agnotocastor Temporal range: Late Eocene–Early Oligocene, 37.2–26.3 Ma

Scientific classification
- Domain: Eukaryota
- Kingdom: Animalia
- Phylum: Chordata
- Class: Mammalia
- Order: Rodentia
- Family: Castoridae
- Tribe: †Agnotocastorini
- Genus: †Agnotocastor; Stirton, 1935

Type species
- †Agnotocastor praetereadens

Species
- †A. coloradensis; †A. galushai; †A. montanus; †A. praetereadens; †A. readingi

Extinct genus of rodents

Agnotocastor is an extinct member of the beaver family Castoridae. Unlike its modern relative, this species took the place of muskrats in the rivers of North America during the Oligocene epoch. The earliest species is A. galushai, which is also the first reliable member of the Castoridae. It is known chiefly from North America, with a single record from Central Asia.
