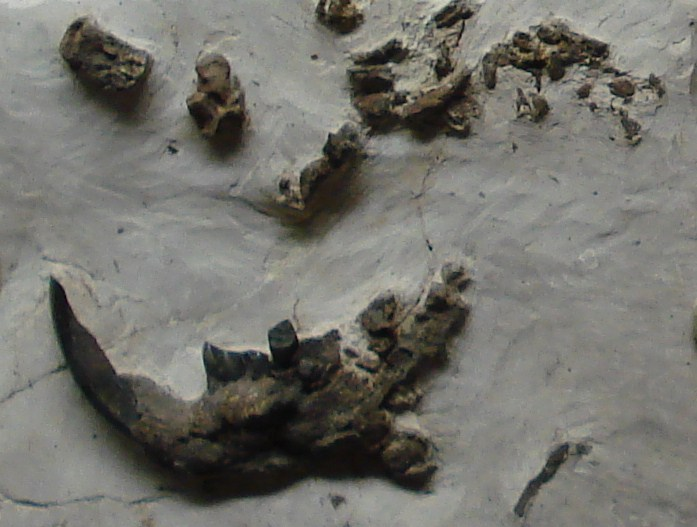
- Fossil jaw

Scientific classification
- Kingdom: Animalia
- Phylum: Chordata
- Class: Mammalia
- Order: Rodentia
- Family: Castoridae
- Subfamily: Castorinae
- Genus: †Steneofiber; Geoffroy, 1833

Species
- †S. castorinus (Pomel, 1847) (type); †S. depereti Mayet, 1908; †S. eseri (Meyer, 1846); †S. minutus (Meyer, 1838); †S. sansaniensis Gervais, 1859; †S. wezensis Sulimski, 1964

= Steneofiber =

Steneofiber Temporal range: Early Oligocene–Middle Miocene

Extinct genus of rodents

Steneofiber is an extinct genus of beavers from the Miocene. They contain several species of beavers. Amongst them are S.barbouri, S.complexus, S.depereti, S.fossor, S.gradatus, and S.hesperus. Their various species are found all the way from the eastern end of the Iberian peninsula to southern Japan. S.depereti has been found in northwest Germany.

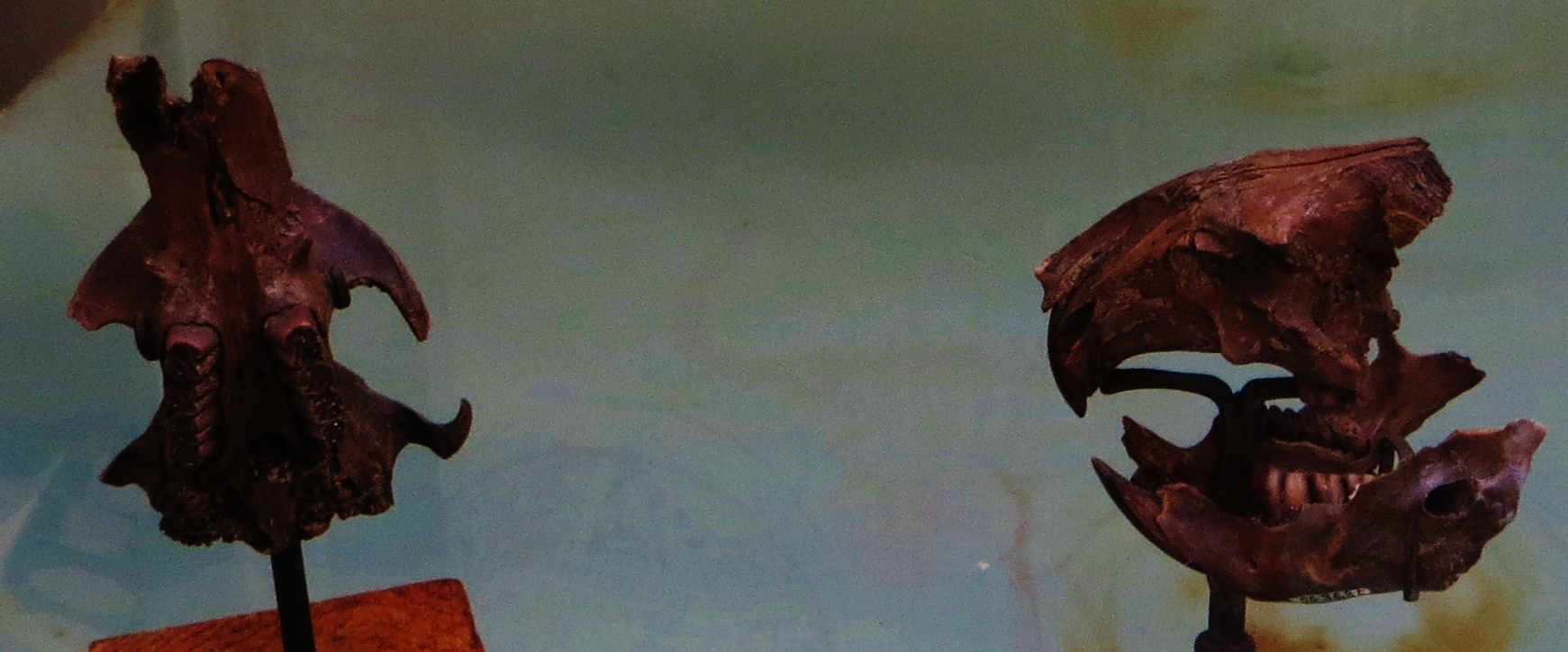
Steneofiber esseri at the Gallery of Paleontology and Comparative Anatomy, Paris.

These small, 30-cm-long (1-ft-long) creatures probably lived in large freshwater lakes, like present day beavers. A semiaquatic lifestyle is indicated by the presence of combing-claws, which living beavers use to waterproof their fur. Most likely, it was incapable of bringing down trees like its modern relatives. Steneofibers were more terrestrial than modern beavers, living in burrows, but fossils are still found near ancient water sources. The finding of a possible family group of Steneofiber skeletons in France has been used to infer that the genus employed a K-selected reproductive strategy like modern beavers, in which extensive parental care is given to a small number of offspring. Steneofibers are among the earliest known members of the subfamily Castorinae, which includes beavers more closely related to the two living species than to the recently extinct giant beaver. It is probably directly descended from the earliest known castorine, Propalaeocastor.
