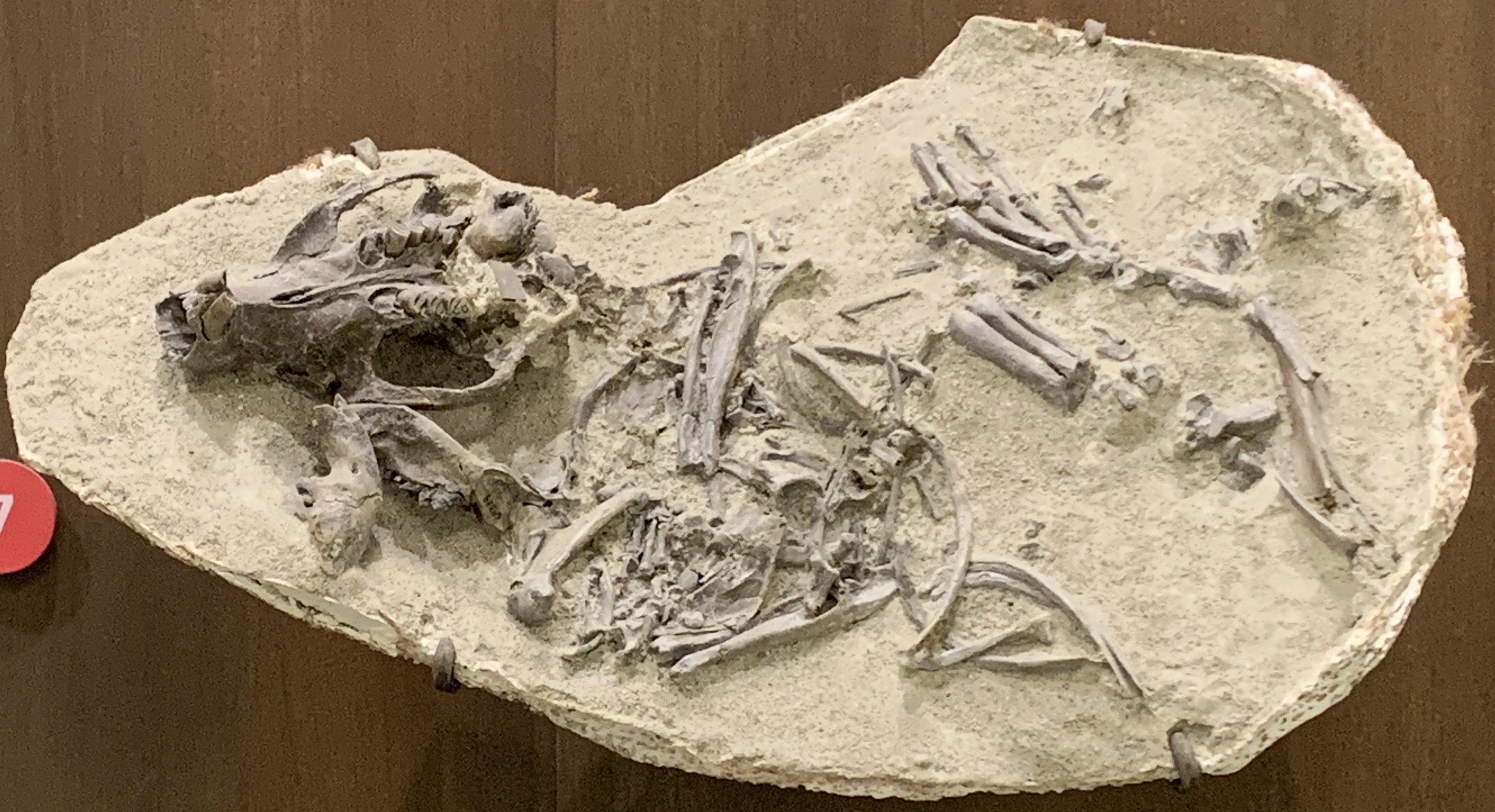
- E. tortus, collected from Cherry County, Nebraska. At the AMNH.

Scientific classification
- Domain: Eukaryota
- Kingdom: Animalia
- Phylum: Chordata
- Class: Mammalia
- Order: Rodentia
- Family: Castoridae
- Tribe: †Nothodipoidini
- Genus: †Eucastor; Leidy, 1858

= Eucastor =

Extinct genus of rodents

Eucastor is an extinct genus of beaver-grouped rodents.

Based on the available evidence of the foramina, Eucastor most likely is closely related to Castor, but not in its direct lineage.

It has two species, the type Eucastor (formerly Castor) tortus, and E. malheurensis

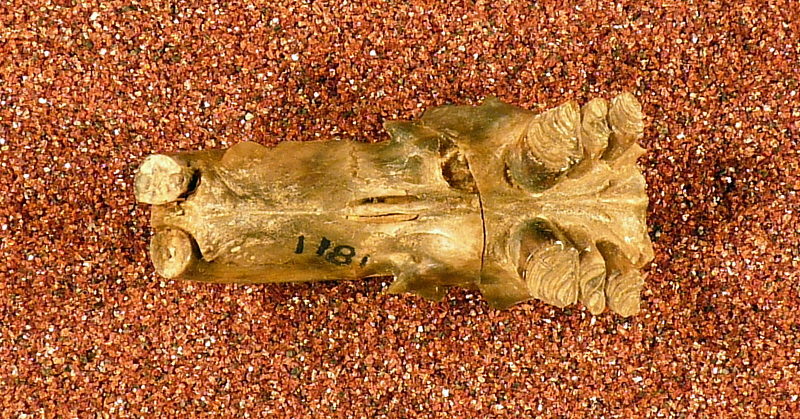
E. tortus skull
