= Lukeino Formation =

Geologic formation in Kenya

- Stratigraphic range: Late Miocene, Messinian, ~6.1–5.8 Ma
- Type: Geological formation
- Sub-units: Aragai Member; Cheboit Member; Kabogongoi Member; Kapcharar Member; Kapsomin Member
- Underlies: Kaparaina Basalts and Toluk Beds
- Overlies: Kabarnet Trachyte and Mpesida Beds

Lithology
- Primary: Clay and loam
- Other: Volcanic ash, carbonates and diatomites

Location
- Region: Baringo County
- Country: Kenya
- Extent: Tugen Hills, Kenya

The Lukeino Formation is a geologic formation located in Kenya and it dates to the Late Miocene (Messinian).

The Lukeino Formation is believed to have been formed through continued tectonic plate activity, and it was located within a well-forested region that was located nearby to Paleolake Lukeino.

== History ==
From 1971 to 1978, Martin Pickford had carried out extensive research in the Tugen Hills under a permit issued by the Kenyan Office of the President.

In 1974, Pickford found the first hominid fossil from the Lukeino Formation, a lower molar, which is included within the holotype of Orrorin tugenensis. The rest of the holotype was found by Pickford and Brigitte Senut in 2000.

Pierre & Pickford (2006) described eight hundred new micromammal fossils from the Kapsomin Member were described.

Altner & Reichenbacher (2015) named the first fish from Paleolake Luekino: Kenyaichthys kipkechi.

A P4 discovered at the Lukeino Formation has been proposed to belong to an amphicyonid by Morales et al. (2016), as both its age and dimensions are similar to Bonisicyon.

Until the mid-1990s, only a few partial remains of cercopithecoideans were known from the Lukeino Formation, and then after surveys were conducted from 1998 onwards by the Kenya Palaeontology Expedition led to the discovery of new material within the Aragai Member, a site situated in the lower levels of the Lukeino Formation. Most of the collection consists of craniodental specimens generally well-preserved in a hard matrix but there are three postcranial bones. As a result of this discovery, a new species was described by Kipkech et al. (2022): Sawecolobus lukeinoensis.

== Paleofauna ==
- Abudhabia tateroides
- Aepyceros
- Amphicyonidae indet. (= cf. Bonisicyon)
- Anancus
- Apodecter aequatorialis
- Cephalophinae indet.
- Chalicotheriidae indet.
- Chamtwaria sp.
- Crocidura kapsominensis
- Deinotherium
- Dendrohyrax
- Dendromus sp.
- Diceros
- Elephantulus sp.
- Erinaceidae indet.
- Galagidae indet.
- Kenyaichthys kipkechi
- Lukeinomys cheptumoae
- Hominoidea indet.
- Hyemoschus
- Hystrix sp.
- Muridae indet.
- Myotis sp.
- Nandinia
- Orrorin tugenensis
- Paraulacodus sp.
- Pedetidae indet.
- Petromus cf. antiquus
- Preacomys cf. griffini
- Preacomys cf. kikiae
- Rousettus sp.
- Saccostromus cf. geraadsi
- Saidomys alisae
- Sawecolobus lukeinoensis.
- Serengetilagus sp.
- Suidae indet.
- Steatomys cf. intermedius
- Steatomys minus
- Suncus sp.
- ?Taphozous sp.
