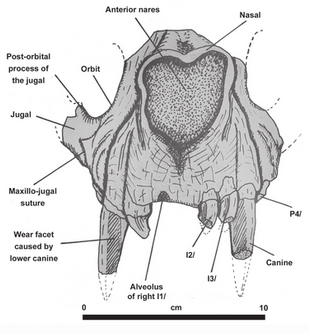
- Reconstructed skull of Myacyon kiptalami

Scientific classification
- Kingdom: Animalia
- Phylum: Chordata
- Class: Mammalia
- Order: Carnivora
- Family: †Amphicyonidae
- Genus: †Myacyon; Sudre and Hartenberger, 1992

Type species
- †Myacyon dojambir Sudre and Hartenberger, 1992

Other species
- Myacyon kiptalami Morales and Pickford, 2005; ?Myacyon peignei Werdelin, 2019

Synonyms
- Agnotherium kiptalami Morales and Pickford, 2005

= Myacyon =

Myacyon Temporal range: Middle to Late Miocene, 14.5–9 Ma Possible Messinian record

Extinct genus of large sized carnivoran mammals

Myacyon is an extinct genus of large sized carnivoran mammals, belonging to the family Amphicyonidae ("bear dogs"), that lived in Africa during the Miocene epoch. Due to the limited scope and fragmentary nature of the severely damaged holotype, as well as the illustrations in its descriptions, which have been called inadequate, usage of this genus poses serious issues. However, it is notable for being one of the last surviving members of its family and its adaptions to hypercarnivory. Its relationships to other amphicyonids are obscure, and it is not closely related to Bonisicyon, the other late surviving African genus, although it has been proposed that it descends from a species of Cynelos or Namibiocyon.

== History and species ==
The genus was erected in 1992 on the basis of a severely damaged and fragmented distal half of a right mandible containing m1-m2, and a not yet erupted m3, found at the locality Oued Mya in Algeria. In 2005, the species Agnotherium kiptalami was described based on a snout broken off behind the second molar (KNM BN 488). A revision of African amphicyonids by Morales et al. in 2016 moved this species, as well as all African material referred to Agnotherium to the genus Myacyon. However, a redescription of Agnotherium in 2020 tentatively included material from Tunisia in this genus instead of Myacyon, although they note that the lack of definitive upper teeth belonging to Agnotherium does not allow them to confidently assign these remains. This material consists of a right maxilla fragment (NOM T-370), a proximal left radius fragment (NOM T-179) and a metatarsal V (NOM T-2269). Morales et al. further referred teeth (KNM-LT 23049, KNM-LT 23073 and KNM-LT 23051) of a large amphicyonid from Lothagam, which represents one of the youngest occurrences of the family worldwide, to Myacyon cf. kiptalami. Additionally, they proposed that a m2 from Beni Mellal, Morocco represents a new species. In 2022 an isolated m2 from Napudet, Kenya was described, likely belong to another, enormous but currently undescribed species.

The species ?Myacyon peignei was described in 2019 based on remains found in Kenya and tentatively assigned to the genus. It is only known from teeth—the holotype is a P4 (KNM-FT 3611), while the other remains are a left m1 (KNM-FT 3379) and right m1 (KNM-FT 3399).

The genus name references the Wadi Mya, which is located close to the site where the remains were found. The species name dojambir is the Arabic word for "December", the month in which the remains were discovered, whereas the names of the other two species honor Kiptalam Cheboi and Stéphane Peigné, respectively.

== Fossil distribution ==
M. dojambir -

- Oued Mya 1, Algeria, ca. 11.2-9 Ma

M. kiptalami -

- Member D, Ngorora Formation, Kenya, ca. 12 Ma
- Kipsaraman, Muruyur Formation, Kenya, ca. 14.5 Ma
- Hondeklip Bay, South Africa, ca. 12 Ma

M. cf. kiptalami -

- Bled Douarah, Beglia Formation, Tunisia, 13-11 Ma
- Samburu Hills, Kenya, 9.5 Ma
- Lower Nawata Formation, Lothagam, Kenya, 7.4 ± 0.1 – 6.5 ± 0.1 Ma

?M. peignei -

- Fort Ternan, Kenya, early Serravallian, 13.8-13.7 Ma

Myacyon sp. -

- Beni Mellal, Morocco, ca. 14 Ma
- Napudet, Kenya, ca. 13 Ma

== Description ==
Most material belonging to this genus suggests that Myacyon included large to very large amphicyonids. The dimensions of Myacyon dojambir and the m2 from Napudet approach those of the largest Amphicyon giganteus and the enormous Cynelos jitu, which have been estimated to weigh over 300 kg, although the material from the Samburu Hills and Beni Mellal is considerably smaller. M. kiptalami is as large or slightly larger than a lion, and the remains from Kipsaraman, Bled Douarah and Lothagam suggest a similar size, ?M. peignei is not nearly as large, being smaller than most Early Miocene species of Cynelos, except for C. euryodon, itself comparable in size to the 42 kg heavy C. lemanensis.

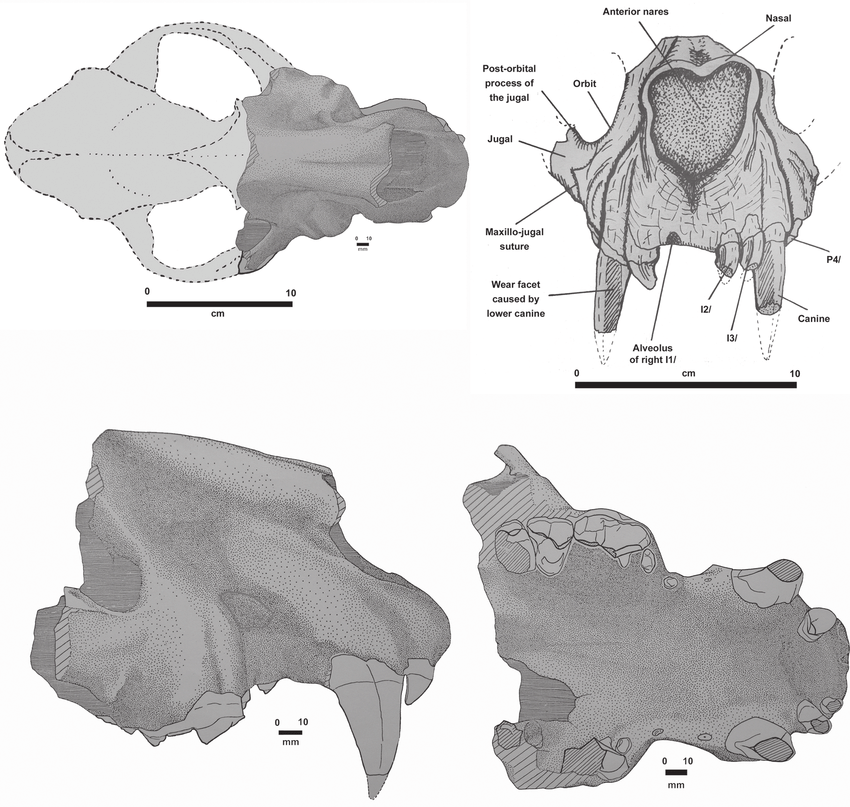
Reconstructed skull of Myacyon kiptalami, showing it in a) dorsal, b) anterior, c) right lateral, and d) palatal view

It is characterized by its sectorial molars, showing adaptions towards hypercarnivory. The large m1 is unlike that of any other amphicyonid, possessing a shallow carnassial notch. It has an elongated trigonid, a strong protoconid, which possesses a strong and tall trenchant anterior crest and a short talonid, with a robust, crested hypoconid and a far distally located entoconid which is small, poorly developed and lacks a crest. The paraconid is indistinct and separated from the protoconid by a very weak notch, which is visible on the buccal margin of the anterior crest, while the metaconid is reduced and situated slightly posteriorly. The short and oblong m2 lacks a paraconid and only possesses a poorly developed metaconid, which is situated at the level of the trenchant protoconid. Its talonid is short and narrower than the trigonid, possessing a strong hypoconid but lacking an entoconid. The trigonids of both teeth have a strong buccal cingulum. The m3 is present, but probably reduced.

The cranial remains of M. kiptalami superficially resembles those of large felids and nimravids, with a short snout, enlarged canines and long diastemata. As in lions, the anterior extremities of its nasals flare outwards and slightly downwards, thereby shifting the nasal notches laterally and widening the nostrils. Its maxillo-premaxillary does not touch the nasals until it has reached the orbital line, which is much further back than in canids. Furthermore, the upper border of the stout premaxilla is lower than in dogs, but similarly projects anteriorly, even if it is less pointed, resulting in the incisors lying in an almost straight line, curved incisor battery of dogs. The incisors have steep roots and long axes and occlusal apices, which point sharply towards the rear. As a result of the outbowing of the maxilla in the region of the carnassial and molar, the maxilla is antero-posteriorly shortened. A further adaption towards shortening the snout is the 90° rotation of the P3 along the part of the maxilla in which it is located. It is tucked behind the parastyle of the carnassial, a position usually be filled by a protocone among other amphicyonids. Above it, a large infraorbital foramen is located. It furthermore possesses a large facial fossa, which lies anterior to the orbit and extends anteriorly and ventrally as a curved furrow immediately behind the canine jugum. As a result of these adaptions, Myacyon had a considerable gape, with canine tips extending 40 mm beneath the occlusal surface of the carnassial and incisors.

M. peignei is only known from a handful of teeth, although the development of the protoconid shelf on its P4 is a distinct feature of this taxon.

== Paleoecology ==
At Oued Mya, Myacyon coexisted with the equid Hipparion and the rhinoceros Aceratherium, as well as the giraffid Palaeotragus and proboscideans.

The discoveries at Member D of the Ngorora Formation suggests that it was once covered by open woodland, with fluvial conditions being present. Here Myacyon was found alongside the immense hyaenodont Megistotherium and its smaller relative Dissopsalis, the lioness-sized hyaena Percrocuta as well as a variety of smaller carnivorans. A large variety of herbivores are known from this site, among them the proboscidean Deinotherium, bovids, suids and the early hippopotamus Kenyapotamus. Fossils of crocodylians, freshwater turtles and fish have also been found.

As indicated by palaeosol carbon isotope studies and tooth microwear patterns, Fort Ternan, where ?M. peignei has been found, was covered by open woodland and located adjacent to highlands. The locality shares many taxons with the Ngorora Formation, among them Afrochoerodon, Climacoceras, Chilotheridium, Gentrytragus, Kipsigicerus, Dorcatherium and Kenyapotamus. The carnivoran assemblage is also similar, including Percrocuta, Dissopsalis and Tugenictis, with a gigantic hyainailourine as the largest predator. The hominoid Kenyapithecus is among the few genera unique to this site.
