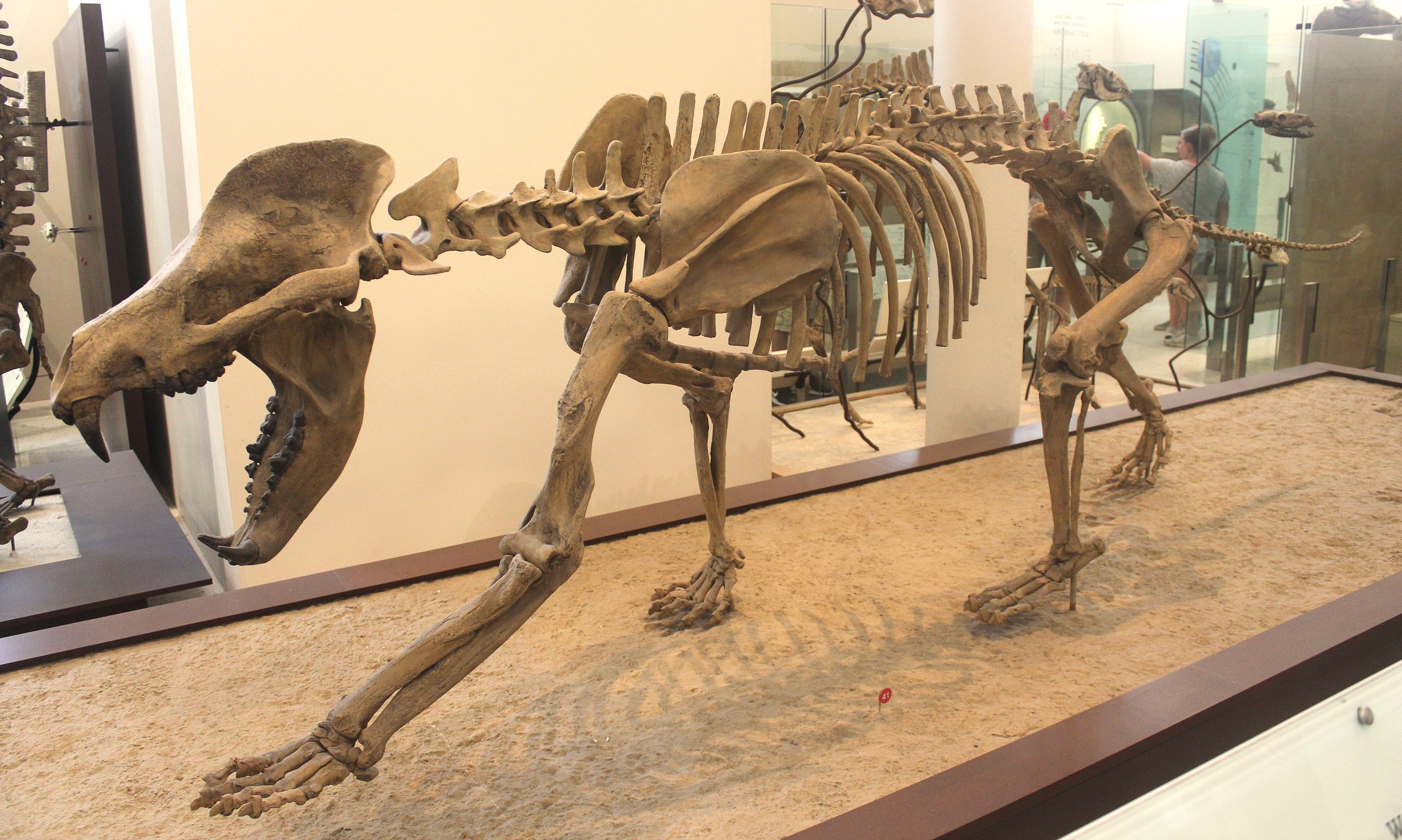
- Amphicyon ingens reconstructed skeleton, American Museum of Natural History

Scientific classification
- Kingdom: Animalia
- Phylum: Chordata
- Class: Mammalia
- Order: Carnivora
- Family: †Amphicyonidae
- Subfamily: †Amphicyoninae
- Genus: †Amphicyon; Lartet, 1836

Type species
- †Amphicyon major Blainville, 1841

Other species
- †A. giganteus? Schinz, 1825; †A. palaeindicus? Lydekker, 1876; †A. gutmanni Kittl, 1891; †A. lydekkeri? Pilgrim, 1910; †A. shahbazi Pilgrim, 1912; †A. frendens Matthew, 1924; †A. ingens Matthew, 1924; †A. reinheimeri? Cook, 1926; †A. lactorensis Astre, 1928; †A. eppelsheimensis Weitzel, 1930; †A. pontoni? Simpson, 1930; †A. cooperi Pilgrim, 1932; †A. pithecophilus Pilgrim, 1932; †A. sindiensis Pilgrim, 1932; †A. confucianus? Young, 1937; †A. riggsi? McGrew, 1939; †A. tairumensis? Colbert, 1939; †A. longiramus White, 1942; †A. astrei Kuss, 1962; †A. olisiponensis? Antunes & Ginsburg, 1977; †A. pannonicus Kretzoi, 1985; †A. laugnacensis Ginsburg, 1989; †A. ulungurensis Qi, 1989; †A. lathanicus Ginsburg, 2000; †A. galushai Hunt, 2003; †A. zhanxiangi Jiangzuo et al., 2019; †A. zhinu Jiangzuo et al., 2025

Synonyms
- Arctamphicyon? Pilgrim, 1932; Megamphicyon? Kuss, 1965; Hubacyon Kretzoi, 1985; Euroamphicyon? Viranta, 1996

= Amphicyon =

Amphicyon Temporal range: Early Miocene to Late Miocene (Aquitanian to Messinian) ~23–7 Ma

Extinct genus of carnivores

Amphicyon is an extinct genus of large carnivorans belonging to the family Amphicyonidae (known colloquially as "bear-dogs"), subfamily Amphicyoninae, from the Miocene epoch. Members of this family received their vernacular name for possessing bear-like and dog-like features. They ranged over North America, Eurasia, and Africa.

== Taxonomy ==
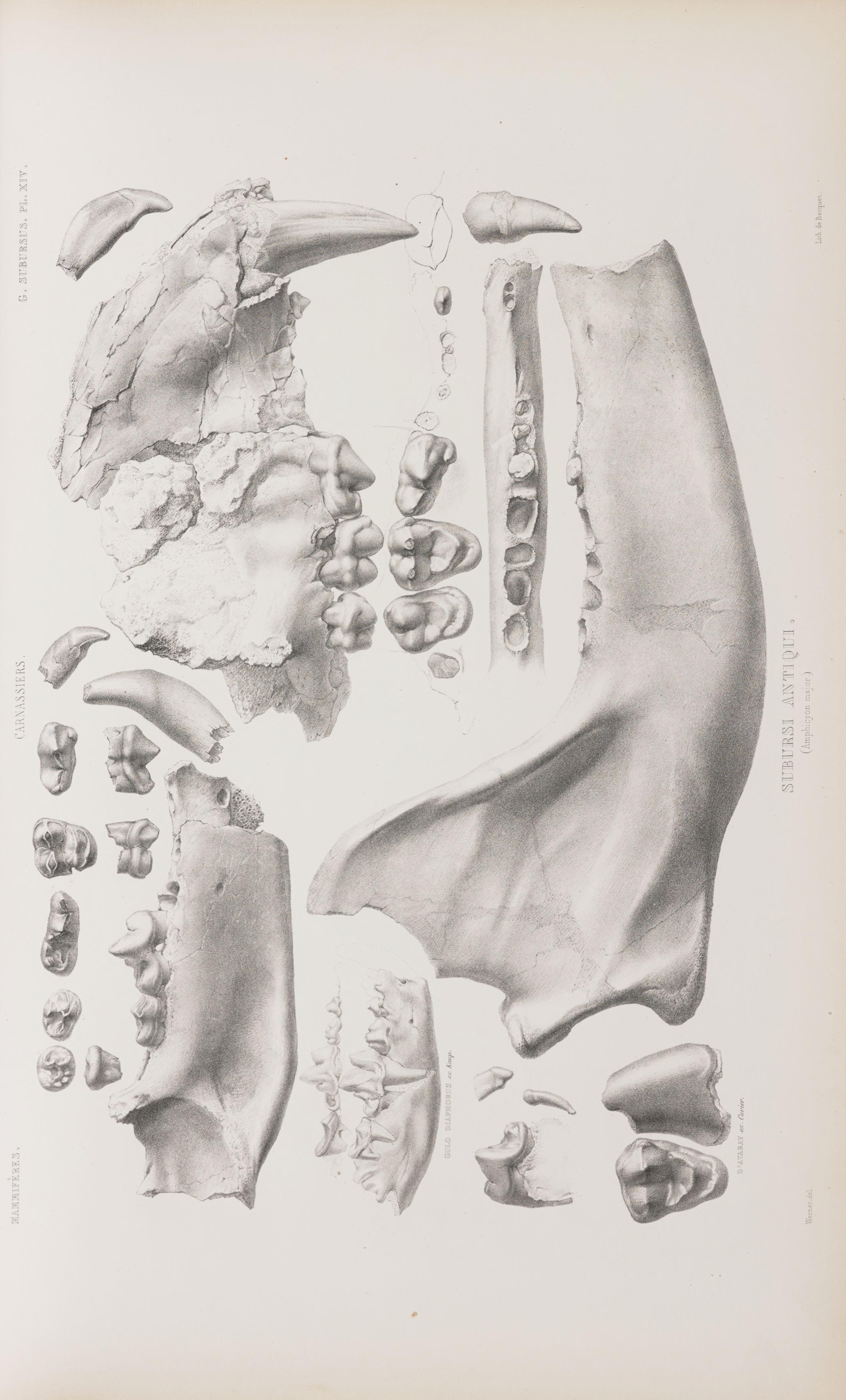
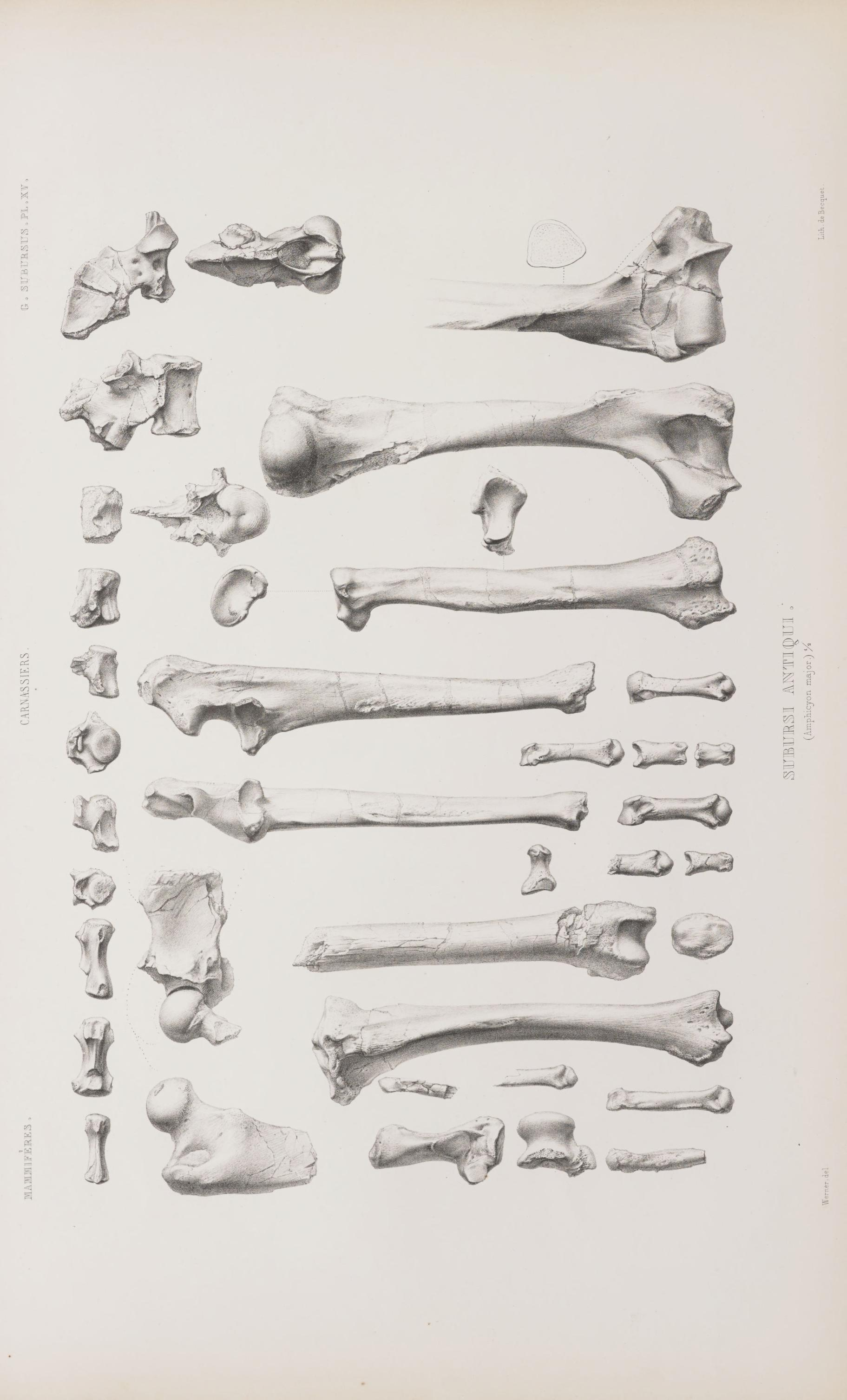
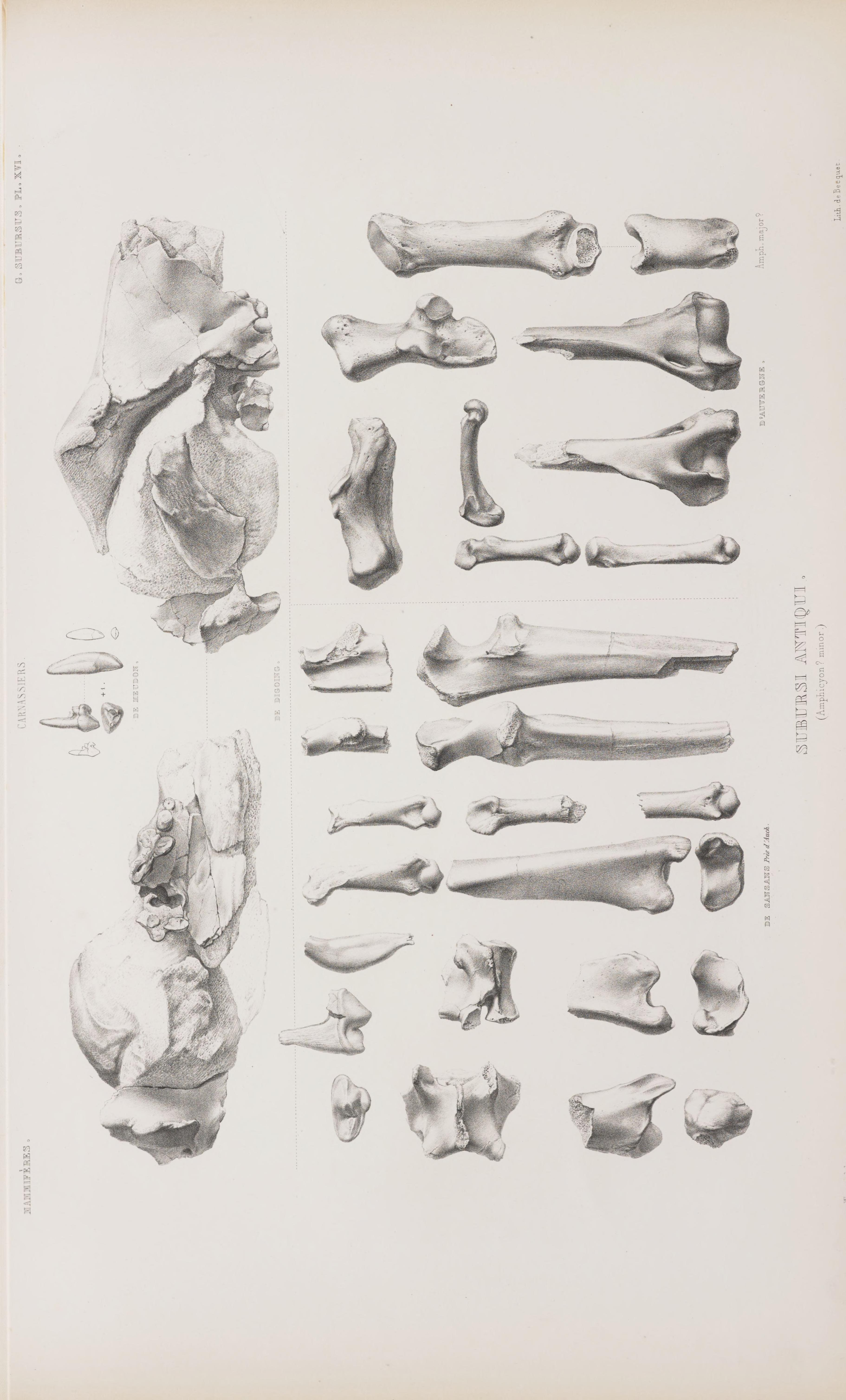
Sketches of fossil bones determined as belonging to Amphicyon by Henri Marie Ducrotay de Blainville in his 1841 iconography of living mammal skeletons and fossil mammal fossils. (1) and (2): Amphicyon major, the type genus. (3) "Amphicyon? minor," which was reclassified to Hemicyon sansaniensis in 1851.

In a note dated back to May 16, 1836, French geologist Alexandre Leymerie wrote a letter in April that he requested from French palaeontologist Édouard Lartet, which provided details of his exploits in palaeontological sites in the French department of Gers, in particular the commune Sansan. Lartet described his finds of fossil taxons that he found within the sites, including "Mastodonte" (species assigned to it were later reclassified to another mammutid Zygolophodon and the gomphothere Gomphotherium), "Dinotherium" (its species eventually reclassified as either Deinotherium or Prodeinotherium), "Rhinoceros" (reclassified as an aceratherine rhinocerotid Hoploaceratherium), and "Palaeotherium" (the referred equid species now known as belonging to an anchitherine Anchitherium). He also recalled finding fossil "deer" species of which he said that the largest ones were the size of extant deer in France while the smallest ones were the size of small antelope. The palaeontologist noted that the "peaceful ruminants" coexisted with a "formidable" large carnivore he provisionally named Amphicyon based on two half-jaws and bones that he sent to a museum. He described it as having unilobed incisors and compressed canines similar to raccoons but also a carnivorous molar and its first two tubercles conforming those to dogs. Lartet then stated that the genus's most distinct trait was the existence of a third tubercle at the upper jaw, which was not known in any other carnivore. The genus name may come from Ancient Greek ἀμφί (amphí), meaning "both", and κύων (kúon), meaning "dog", but Lartet did not define the genus's etymology.

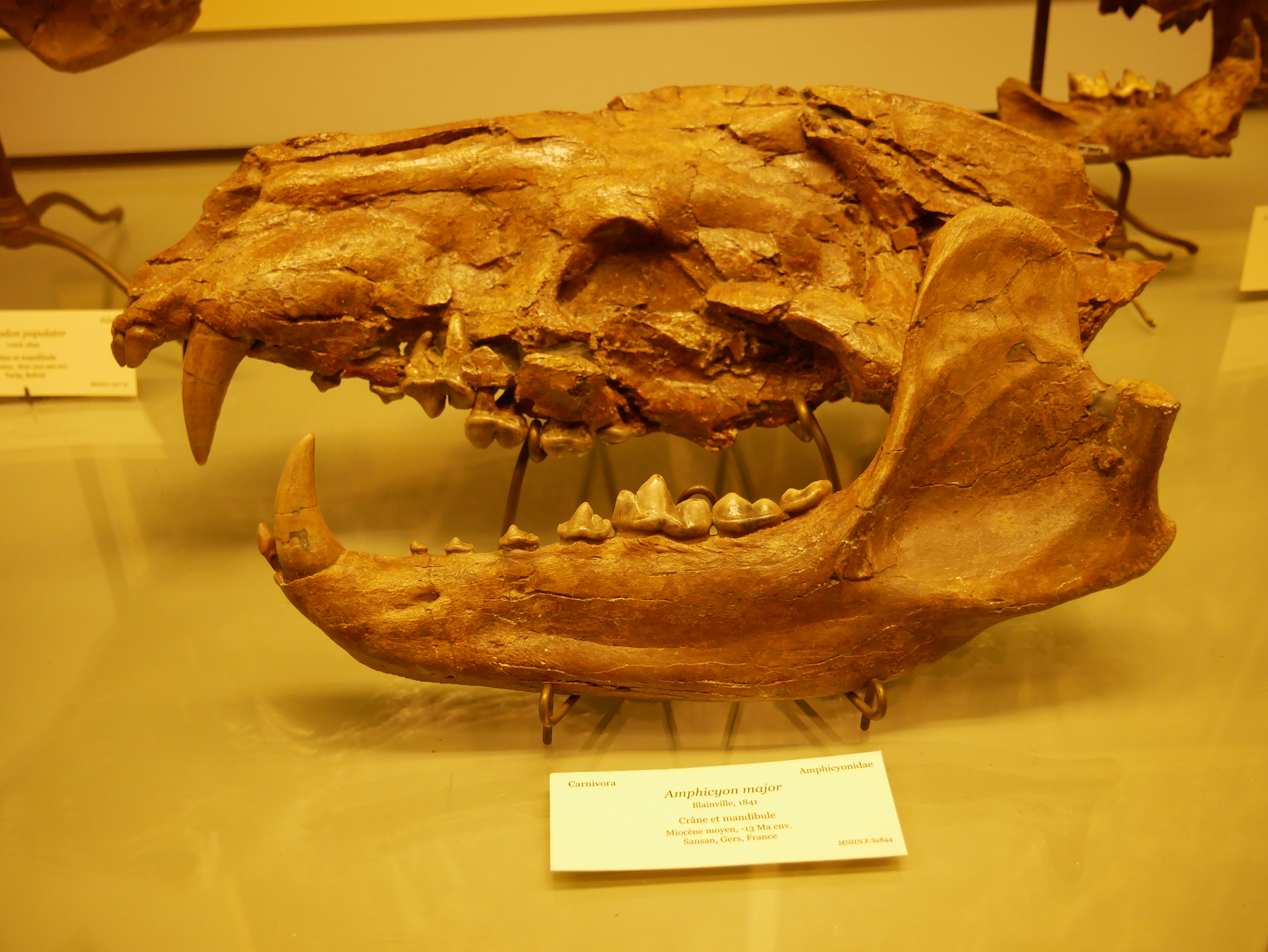
Amphicyon major cranium and mandible, National Museum of Natural History, France

Despite the initial status of the genus name Amphicyon as nonpermanent, French anatomist Henri Marie Ducrotay de Blainville, a peer who Lartet had regularly discussed his fossil findings with, had sketched mammal skeletons and fossils in 1841, where he recognized the 2 species "Amphicyon major" and "Amphicyon? minor." In 1851, Lartet reviewed the fossil carnivoran genera from Sansan. Among them were Amphicyon, in which it was reconfirmed as a carnivorous mammal the size of extant bears that was discovered in Sansan in 1835. He recalled that its single-lobed incisors and its canines of serrated ridges are similar to the raccoon while the molars were similar to that of a dog. He confirmed the fossil specimens along with the third tubercle in the upper jaw (of which he said that it only exists in the extant bat-eared fox (then known as "Canis megalotis")) as belonging to the species Amphicyon major. The palaeontologist described it as also having an anatomy of plantigrade locomotion similar to extant bears with few differences in form. Blainville was mentioned as speculating that it must have had a long and very strong tail. The species "Amphicyon minor" was reclassified as a separate genus Hemicyon, which he described as a carnivore larger than a European wolf that was closer in form to a dog than Amphicyon and had dentition similar to mustelids. He also described a newer genus Pseudocyon, which he misidentified as being digitigrade and described as being smaller than Amphicyon and coming closest to canids based on its dentition and bones. All three genera, Lartet said, had canines that retained finely serrated edges, implying that they were some of the top coexisting predators of the Miocene in modern-day France.

== Species ==
=== European species ===
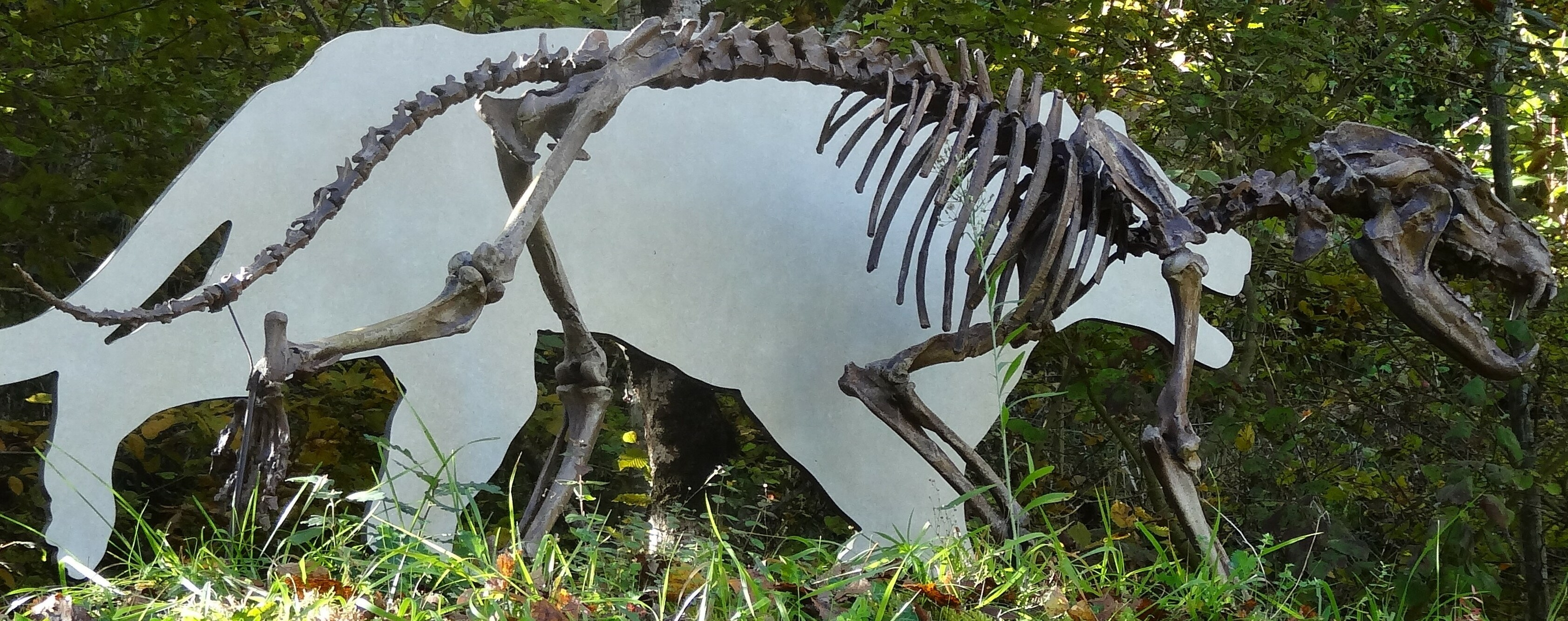
Amphicyon major reconstructed skeleton, Site paléontologique de Sansan

- Amphicyon astrei

The oldest known species of the genus, A. astrei is known from the Early Miocene sites Gardouch and Paulhiac in France, which date to MN1 (or "Mammal Neogene 1" as part of the Mammal Neogene zones). The species was originally described by Kuss in 1962, however, he also noted that its features do not completely match any known genus, and later moved it to the genus Pseudocyon, as subspecies of P. sansanienis, and considered it to be ancestral to P. s. intermedius (which has since then been moved to the separate genus Crassidia). Ginsburg and Antunes later reassigned it to Amphicyon, which was followed by other authors, and suggested that it was ancestral to later species of the genus. Unlike later members of the genus, it did not possess enlarged posterior molars.

- Amphicyon lactorensis

This species was originally described by Astre on the basis of a single molar, from the French locality Le Mas d'Auvignon, which dates to MN4/5. Ginsburg referred more material from MN4-5 of France to this species, and assigned it to the subgenus Euroamphicyon. Its M2 is peculiar, as it is anteroposteriorly shortened but transversely elongated. Kuss synonymized it with A. depereti, which has since been moved to Ysengrinia, although later authors generally consider it to be a valid species of Amphicyon.

- Amphicyon major

A. major, which was named by De Blainville in 1841, is both the type species of the genus but also the best known, as various cranial and even postcranial remains have been discovered across Western and Central Europe as well as Turkey. It first appeared in MN4 and lasted until at least MN6. Amphicyonid remains from La Grive Saint-Alban, dating back to MN7/8, have also been assigned to this species. Others point out the differences between these fossils and the type material of A. major, suggesting that they may belong to a separate species. It is likely closely related to the geologically younger A. eppelsheimensis, A. gutmanni and A. pannonicus, the first two of which had previously been assigned to A. major as subspecies.

- Amphicyon eppelsheimensis

A mandible and a mandibular fragment belong to A. eppelsheimensis were originally discovered at the locality Eppelsheim in Germany, and described by Weitzel in 1930. Other remains have since been found at Gau-Weinheim, which is located in close proximity to Eppelsheim, and the Spanish Valles de Fuentidueña. All these localities date to MN9-10. The taxonomic status of this species is controversial, with Kuss and several other authors considering this taxon to be a subspecies or synonym of A. major. Later authors however suggest that the two species are distinct, with A. eppelsheimensis possibly being the last representative of the A. major lineage. Notably, the p4 is more strongly reduced than in A. major, and it is also slightly larger.

- Amphicyon gutmanni

A. gutmanni was described by Kittl in 1891 on the basis of a single, robust and low-crowned lower carnassial. Kuss considered it to be a subspecies of A. major, but Kretzoi argued for its validity, based on the contour of its talonid, and even erected the separate genus Hubacyon, with H. gutmanni as type species. Viranta followed his arguments for the distinction of this species, but did not consider Hubacyon to be a valid genus. The highest point of its hypoconid is located more posterior than in other members of this genus, and a line drawn from the posterolingual corner to the posterobuccal corner possesses a greater angle on the buccal side, due to the extended posterobuccal corner. Both of these features are similar to those seen in thaumastocyonines. Its type locality Mannersdorf, in Austria, is of uncertain age, but the presence of hipparionine horses shows that it is no older than MN9. Viranta also tentatively assigns molars from Kohfidisch, previously referred to cf. A. giganteus, to this species. As this locality dates to MN11, this would make it one of the youngest members of the family. This species is likely closely related to A. major.

- Amphicyon pannonicus

The molar of this species was discovered in the Danitzpuszta sandpit in Pécs, southern Hungary, and originally described by Kretzoi in 1985 as Hubacyon (Kanicyon) pannonicus. Some authors state that locality of where it was found has been considered to date to MN11-12, which would make it one of the youngest known amphicyonids, although its exact dating is unclear. However, the terrestrial assemblage of the sandpit generally points towards an Early Pannonian (Vallesian) age, as which is in agreement with Kretzoi's original description. This species is potentially hypercarnivorous, and only known from a single, fragmentary tooth, which is smaller, more slender and gracile than that of A. gutmanni, as well as considerably more brachydont. Just like A. gutmanni, it is considered to be closely related to A. major.

- Amphicyon carnutense

A. carnutense, known from the MN3 of France and possibly Czechia, is a large species with a confusing taxonomic history. The type material from Chilleurs-aux-Boiwas was originally described a subspecies of A. giganteus, A. g. carnutense, and considered ancestral to the nominal subspecies A. g. giganteus. The subspecies was discarded later on, but other authors considered A. carnutense distinct enough for it to be classified as a separate species. Adding to the confusion is the status of Megamphicyon, to which A. carnutense is referred, which is variously considered to be synonymous with Amphicyon, a subgenus of the former or a separate genus altogether. Furthermore, Amphicyon lathanicus, originally described in 2000 on basis of isolated teeth from Beilleaux à Hommes, France, which date to MN3, with further remains reported across France, is likely synonymous with A. carnutense.

- Amphicyon giganteus

A. giganteus was originally described by Schinz in 1825, and in 1965 Kuss erected the genus Megamphicyon for this species, based on differences in its dentition and size between it and A. major. Subsequent authors generally disregarded this assignment, with Ginsburg considering Megamphicyon a subgenus of Amphicyon. Siliceo et al. revived the genus in 2020, a classification that was followed by some authors. Others, however, reject the reclassification in favour of the older classification A. giganteus. A. giganteus was a widespread European species that lived during the late Burdigalian to late Seravallian, corresponding to the MN4-MN7/8. Most remains were found in Western Europe, although the youngest known record of the species is from Turkey, possibly suggesting the species survived in Anatolia after it had already gone extinct in Europe. Fossils from this species are also known from Bosnia and Herzegovina as well as the locality Arrisdrift in Namibia. It has also been referred to fossil specimens from Moghra in Egypt, but the referral of these fossils remains controversial. It has furthermore been reported from levels 5 to 6 of Pakistans lower Vihowa Formation. The age of these remains is between 19 and 18.5 Ma, with a molar from the base of the Potwar Plateau sequence extending its range in the Siwaliks to 17.9 Ma. An even younger fossil possibly referable to this species is a large humerus known from the base of the Manchar formation. It differs from A. major through its larger size, bigger premolars, shorter diastemata, a P4 that possesses a larger and lingually extended protocone and the presence of a paracone, that is very large and high paracone in comparison with its metacone, on its elongated M1. A. eibiswaldensis is generally considered to be a junior synonym of this species.

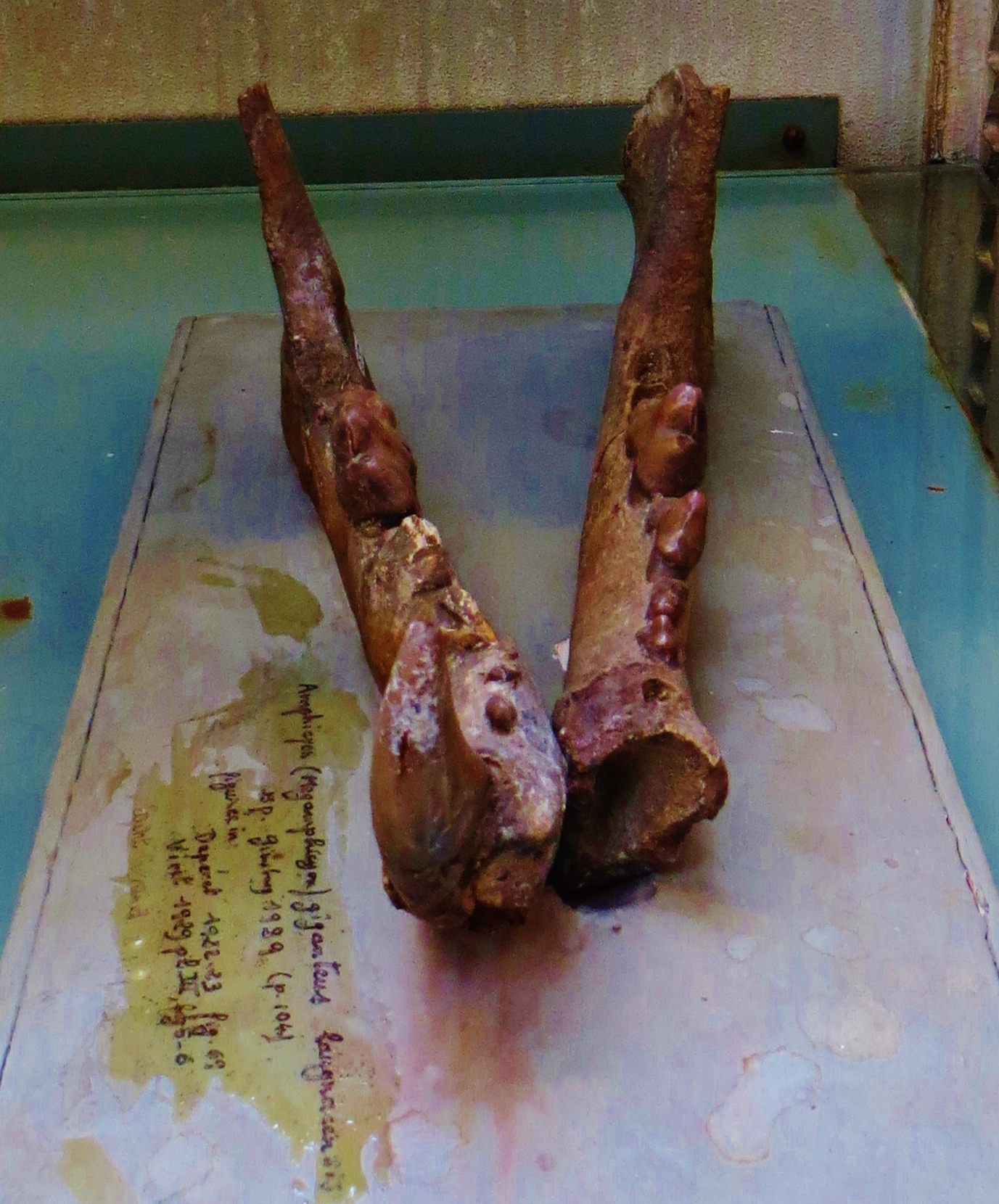
Mandible of A. giganteus

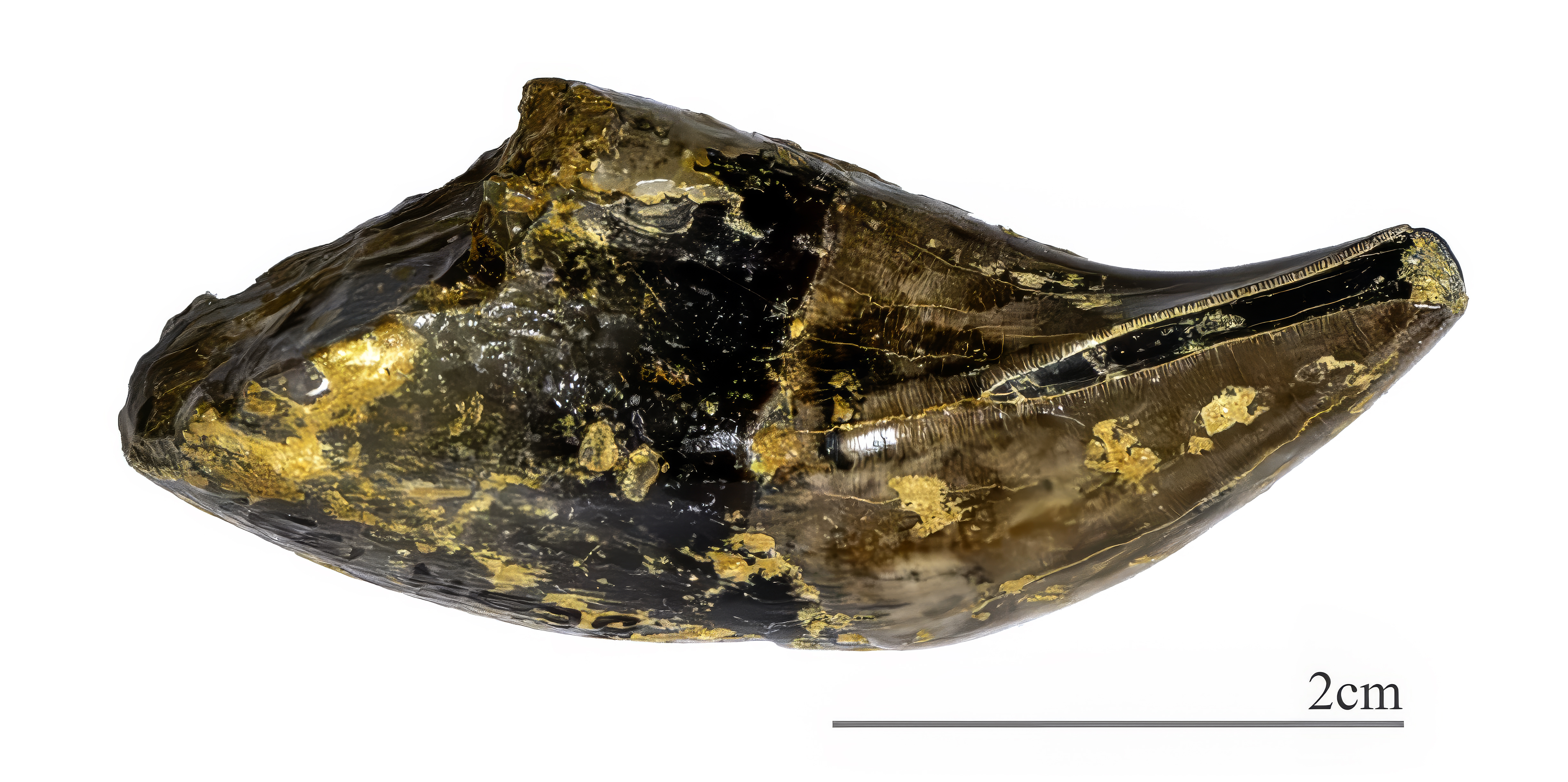
Megamphicyon giganteus Canine MHNT
- Amphicyon laugnacensis

Originally described as subspecies of A. giganteus, A. laugnacensis was elevated to species level by Ginsburg in 1999. It is the oldest known member of the A. giganteus lineage, with both its type locality Laugnac and possible remains from Gérand-le-Puy and Grépiac dating to MN2. Its holotype is a maxilla, previously referred to A. astrei, possesses a parastyle and a more posteriorly located protocone.

- Amphicyon olisiponensis

A. olisiponensis was described by Antunes and Ginsburg in 1977 on the basis of a mandible discovered near Lisbon. Isolated teeth belonging to this species have also been reported from Buñol in Spain. Both these localities date to MN4, although there is a possible report from La Retama, which dates to MN5, but the remains from there are as of yet undescribed. Differences in dentition, most notably the reduction of its premolars, led Viranta to erect the separate genus Euroamphicyon for this species. This proposal of a separate genus is followed by some authors. Others, however, do not recognize "Euroamphicyon" as a distinct genus and instead still use A. olisiponensis.

=== Asian species ===
- Amphicyon ulungurensis

A. ulungurensis is known from the early Langhian in the Halamagai Formation, near the Ulungur River from which it derives its name. Due to the lack of observation on the characteristics of the upper molars, there is neither evidence for including it nor for excluding it from the genus, in which it is placed mostly on the basis of its very large size. the holotype of this species is a fragmentary right hemimandible, but postcranial remains belonging to this species have also been described, including a comparatively small calcaneum and cuboid, possibly indicating sexual dimorphism.

- Amphicyon zhanxiangi

The only Asian amphicyonid which definitely belongs to the genus Amphicyon, A. zhanxiangi was described in 2018 based on a maxillary fragment from the Zhang'enbao Formation in Ningxia, China. The Yinziling subfauna to which it belongs dates to the late Shanwangian, roughly corresponding to MN5. It has also been reported from the slightly younger locality Lagou, part of the Hujialiang Formation, in the Linxia Basin, dating to the Tunggurian, which is equivalent to MN6. A. zhanxiangi is medium-sized, comparable to A. major, and closely related to A. giganteus. Over time, the diet of the species adapted towards omnivory as it moved towards more southern and humid areas, where greater amounts of plant material were available. The Lagou specimen shows greater adaptions to omnivory than the older one from Ningxia, which lived farther to the north, in a more arid terrain. This trend likely continued, with A. zhanxiangi being the probable ancestor of Arctamphicyon.

- Amphicyon zhinu

The holotype of this species, a broken skull, with almost complete maxilliary teeth, was originally discovered in the 1980s in southeastern Xin'an county, Henan Province, China, before being described in 2025. A. zhinu is a small species, with its dental measurements being comparable to Paludocyon. Its enlargened molars and reduced premolars, combined with the general robustness of its teeth, capable of both slicing meat and crushing tough materials, supports an omnivorous diet, similar to that of A. zhanxiangi. However, Jiangzuo et al. argue that there is no evidence to suggest that one of the two species is ancestral to the other, and rather suggest that they evolved concurrently. The smaller size of A. zhinu, combined with the lack of a robust upper carnassial to cut through skin, as seen in their larger relatives, suggest that it likely preyed on smaller animals than other members of the genus. The fauna it is associated with (the hyaena relative Percrocuta, the suids Miocheorus and Listriodon, as well as the bovid Turcocerus) indicate a late Tunggurian age, roughly corresponding to the European MN6 to MN7/8 (ca. 15–13 Ma).

- Amphicyon lydekkeri

A. lydekkeri is known from the Dhok Pathan horizon in Pakistan and was described by Pilgrim in 1910, who later attributed it to its own genus, Arctamphicyon. However, Pilgrim identified the holotype as first m1 and then as M1, despite it actually being a M2, making the diagnosis invalid. It has furthermore been argued that the differences between "Arctamphicyon" and Amphicyon are negligible, with the former being a junior synonym of the latter. Other authors consider the differences distinct enough for the separation of the two genera. Fossils from Yuanmou in Yunnan, and the Lower Irrawaddy Formation in Myanmar, show affinities to this species, and have been assigned to Arctamphicyon by Sun et al. Approaching the size of A. giganteus, this taxon is among the largest Siwalik species. It is also one of the youngest known amphicyonids, only surpassed by the African Bonisicyon and possibly Myacyon, as the rocks near Padhri where it was discovered likely date to 8 to 7 Ma.

- Amphicyon cooperi

This species is only definitely known from its holotype, a single m1, discovered in rocks of the Bugi Hills probably dating to the early Miocene, although possible remains have been reported from the zones 4 and 6 of the Dera Bugti synclinal. It was described by Pilgrim in 1932. He noted that the tooth is very similar to that of A. shahbazi, although A. cooperi lacks an external cingulum, and that it may actually belong to that species. Barry also considers it to be a synonym of A. shahbazi.

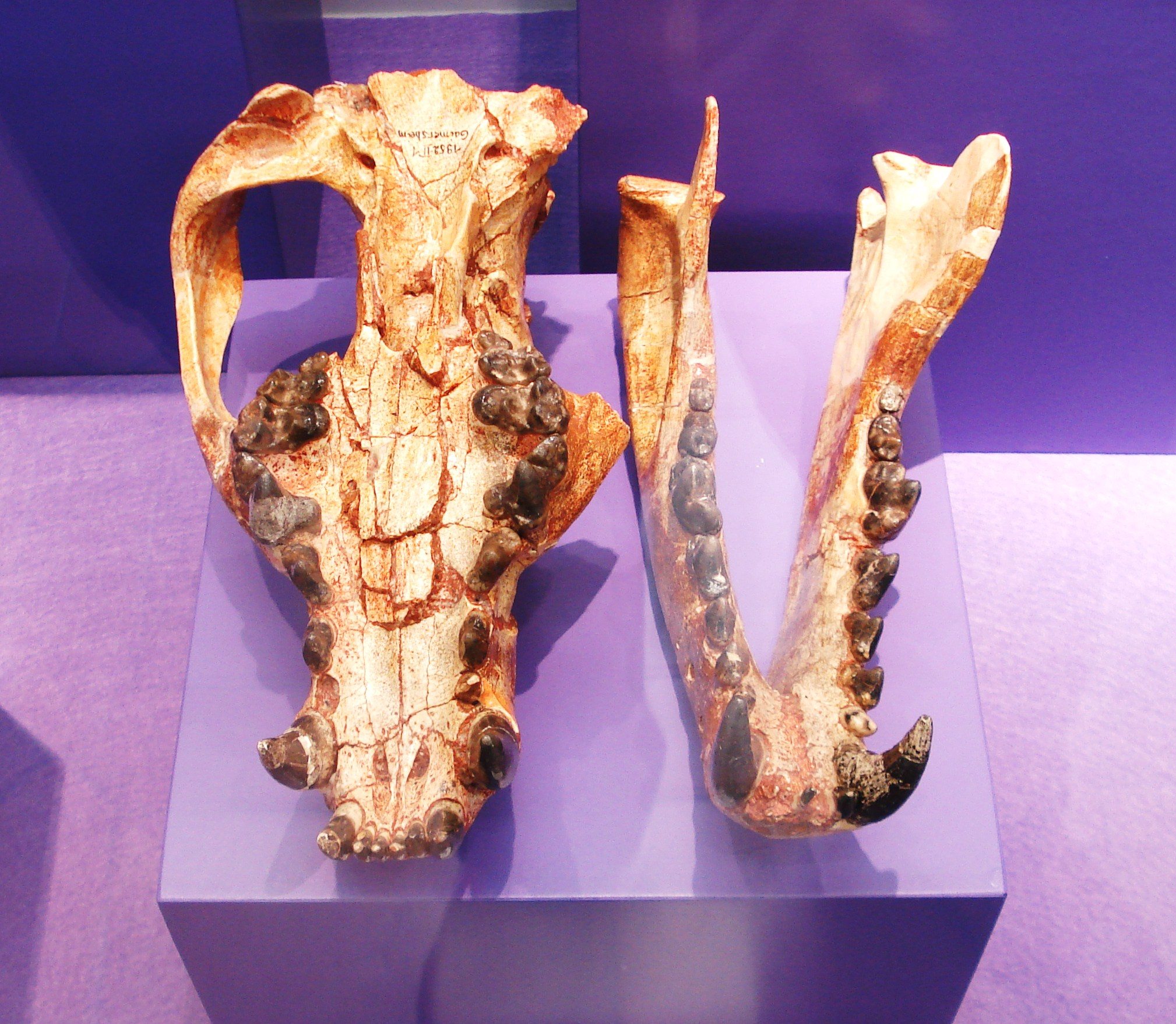
Skull and mandible of Amphicyon, Paläontologisches Museum München

- Amphicyon palaeindicus

A. palaeindicus was described by Richard Lydekker in 1876 on the basis of an isolated M2 collected at Kushalgarh in the Potwar Plateau. Later authors referred a fragmentary mandible from Chinji, isolated teeth from the Chinji and the Nagri zones, and the Dang Valley, to this species. The exact age of the Chinji specimens cannot be defined, as the fossil-bearing localities in this region stretch from ca. 15 to 9 Ma, although the correlation of the Dang Valley fauna suggests that they're of late middle Miocene age, whereas the Nagri fauna dates to the Vallesian. It has been suggested that none of the Siwalik species truly belong to Amphicyon, although others suggests that A. palaeindicus should be referred to this genus. In 2015, Ramesh Sehgal also reported an occurrence of A. palaeindicus, but from Late Miocene of Dhok Pathan Formation of Nurpur, Himachal Pradesh in India. In a 2025 review of Siwalik carnivorans, it is argued that most remains previously referred to A. pithecophilus should actually be referred to this species, alongside a number of isolated remains, expanding the timespan during which A. palaeindicus existed from ca. 18 to 11 Ma. The various fossils indicate a notable size variation within this species, though the range of its dimensions is broadly similar to A. major.

- Amphicyon pithecophilus

Pilgrim erected this species in 1932 on basis of an isolated m2 from Chinji. He furthermore assigned two fragmentary mandibles, from Chinji and Nurpur, previously referred to A. palaeindicus to this species. Colbert considered it a synonym of that species, although later authors considered it distinct due to its larger metacone and stronger buccal cingulum on the M2. However, Colbert's arguments are echoed by Barry, who contends that the afromentioned remains should instead be assigned to A. palaeindicus and A. lydekkeri.

- Amphicyon sindiensis

A. sindiensis is one of the most poorly known species assigned to the genus, being only known from a fragmentary right mandible and an isolated molar from the basal beds of the Manchar Formation in Pakistan, dating to the early Middle Miocene. The dimensions of its m2 are similar to those of Maemohcyon. It has been argued that this species is in fact a synonym of A. shahbazi.

- Amphicyon shahbazi

A. shahbazi was described by Pilgrim in 1910 on the basis of two poorly preserved mandibular fragments from the Bugti Hills. the exact age of these fossils is not known, but other fragmentary remains assigned to this species, discovered in the upper Chitarwata Formation and lower Vihowa Formation, which correlate with MN2-3, suggests they date to the Early Miocene. A review from 2025 argues that both A. cooperi and A. sindiensis are junior synonyms of A. shahbazi, giving it a temporal range of circa 22 to 18.5 Ma. It is slightly smaller than A. palaeindicus.

- Amphicyon confucianus

It is only known from a single, fragmentary right hemimandible, which includes p3 and m1. A. confucianus is part of the Shanwang Local Fauna, which dates to ca. 16 Ma. It is a large species, comparable to A. ulungurensis in size. The attribution of this species to Amphicyon remains unclear, although it probably does not belong to this genus.

- Amphicyon tairumensis

"Amphicyon" tairumensis was described by Edwin Harris Colbert in 1939, on the basis of a left hemimandible with heavily worn teeth discovered in the Inner Mongolian Tunggur Formation. It is a wolf-sized predator, considerably smaller than A. major. The m1 is swollen at the lingual point between the talonid and the trigonid, a feature not seen in European members of the genus. A similar, but currently unpublished, form from Laogou has upper dental characteristics quite unlike Amphicyon, and it has been proposed that it is more closely related to Pseudocyon because of its size and the lingual convexity of its m1.

=== North American species ===
- Amphicyon galushai

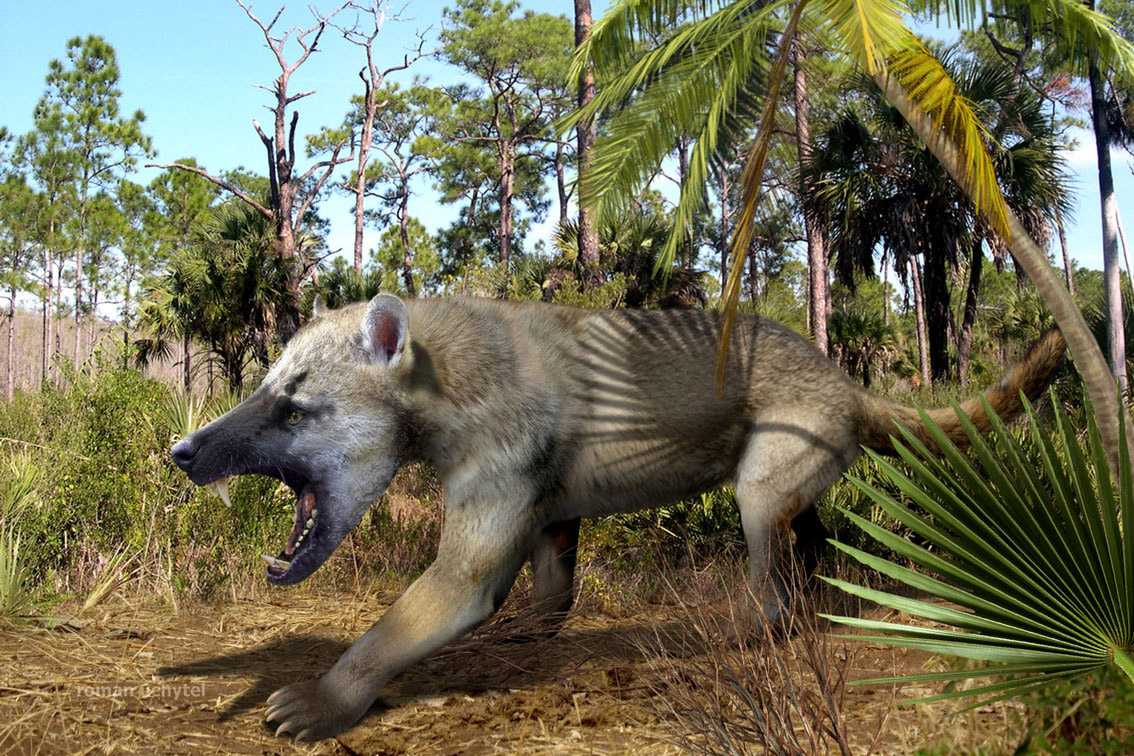
Restoration of A. ingens

A. galushai represents the first occurrence of Amphicyon in North America, approximately 18.8–17.5 Mya during the early Hemingfordian. Described by Robert M. Hunt Jr. in 2003, it is mostly known from fossils found in the Runningwater Formation of western Nebraska and includes a complete adult skull, a partial juvenile skull, 3 mandibles and teeth and postcranial elemenents representing least 15 individuals. There is an additional skull fragment from the Troublesome Formation of Colorado. A. galushai is considered ancestral to the late Hemingfordian species, Amphicyon frendens.

- Amphicyon frendens

A. frendens lived during the late Hemingfordian, 17.5–15.9 Mya. The species was originally described by W. Matthew in 1924 from specimens found in the middle member of the Sheep Creek Formation, Sioux County, Nebraska. A. frendens specimens have since been found at sites in Harney and Malheur Counties, Oregon. It was considerably bigger than the earlier A. galushai, and possessed a larger M2.

- Amphicyon ingens

This huge species lived during the early to middle Barstovian, 15.8–14.0 Mya. It was originally described by W. Matthew in 1924 from specimens found in the Olcott Formation, Sioux County, Nebraska. Specimens attributed to this species have since been found in California, Colorado and New Mexico. A. ingens possessed the largest canines of any amphicyonine.

- Amphicyon longiramus

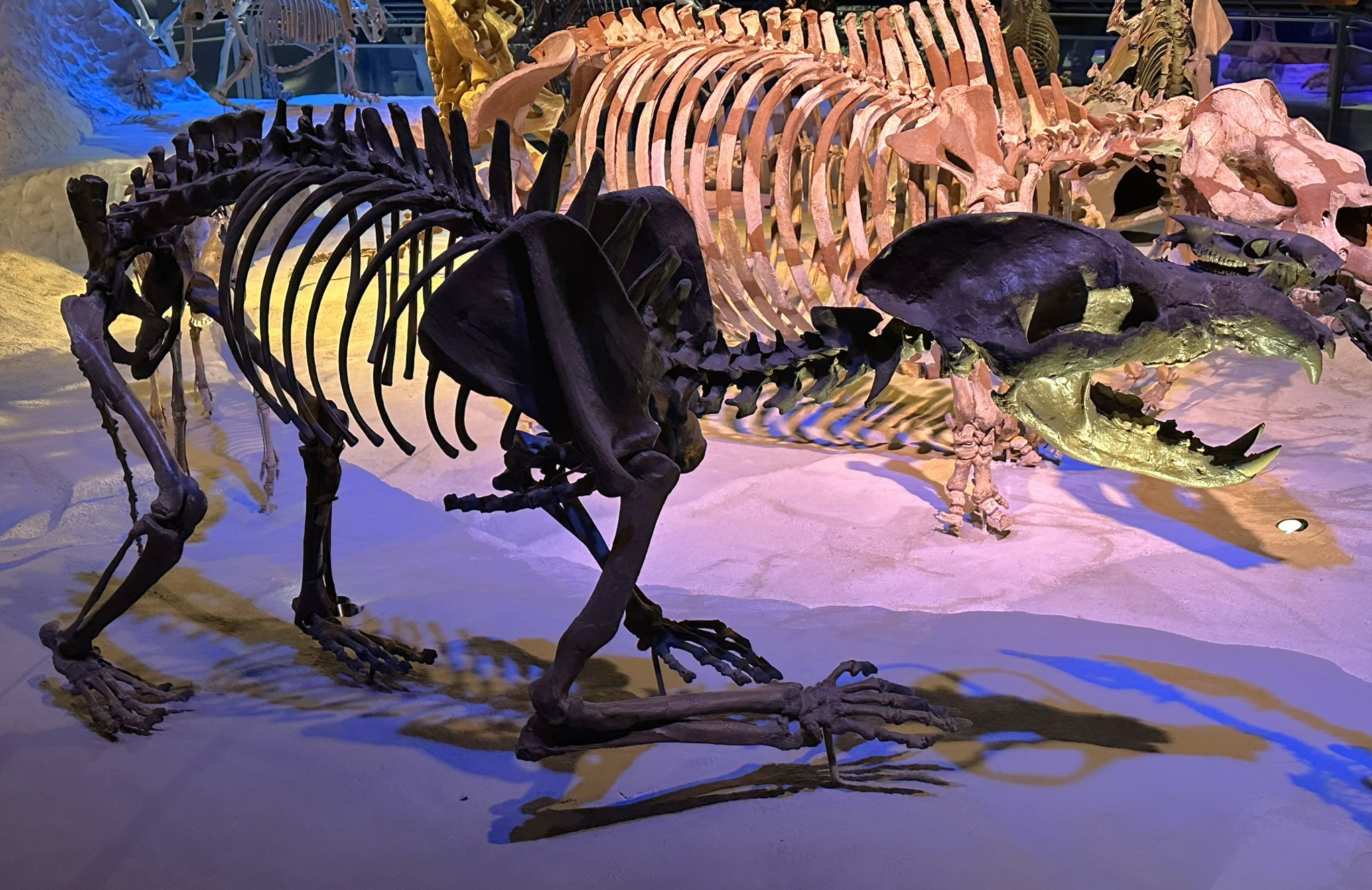
A. longiramus reconstructed skeleton, Florida Museum of Natural History

The species from found at Thomas Farm of the Hawthorne Formation in Florida was originally described by White in 1940 as Amphicyon intermedius. However, the name was already preoccupied by a different species described by von Meyer in 1849, nowadays known as Crassidia intermedia, a thaumastocyonine from Germany and France that is not closely related to the taxon found in Florida. Two years later White described another species, A. longiramus, named for its exaggeratedly long skull, from the same locality, which he believed was disti nct due to its larger size, among other factors. Since then, others have noted that the supposed difference between these two species is likely to be a result of sexual dimorphism. Olsen therefore referred to A. longiramus as the valid name for this taxon, an assignment that was acknowledged by Heizmann and Kordikova as well as the Florida Museum of Natural History. It was easily the largest carnivoran in its habitat, with "A. intermedius" being described assimilar in size to A. galushai. Beyond its type locality, it is furthermore known from the lower part of the Calvert Formation at the Pollack Farm Site in Delaware as well as the Garvin Gulley and the Brenham Local Fauna from Texas, possibly indicating that it was widely distributed across eastern North America during the Hemingfordian.

== Description ==
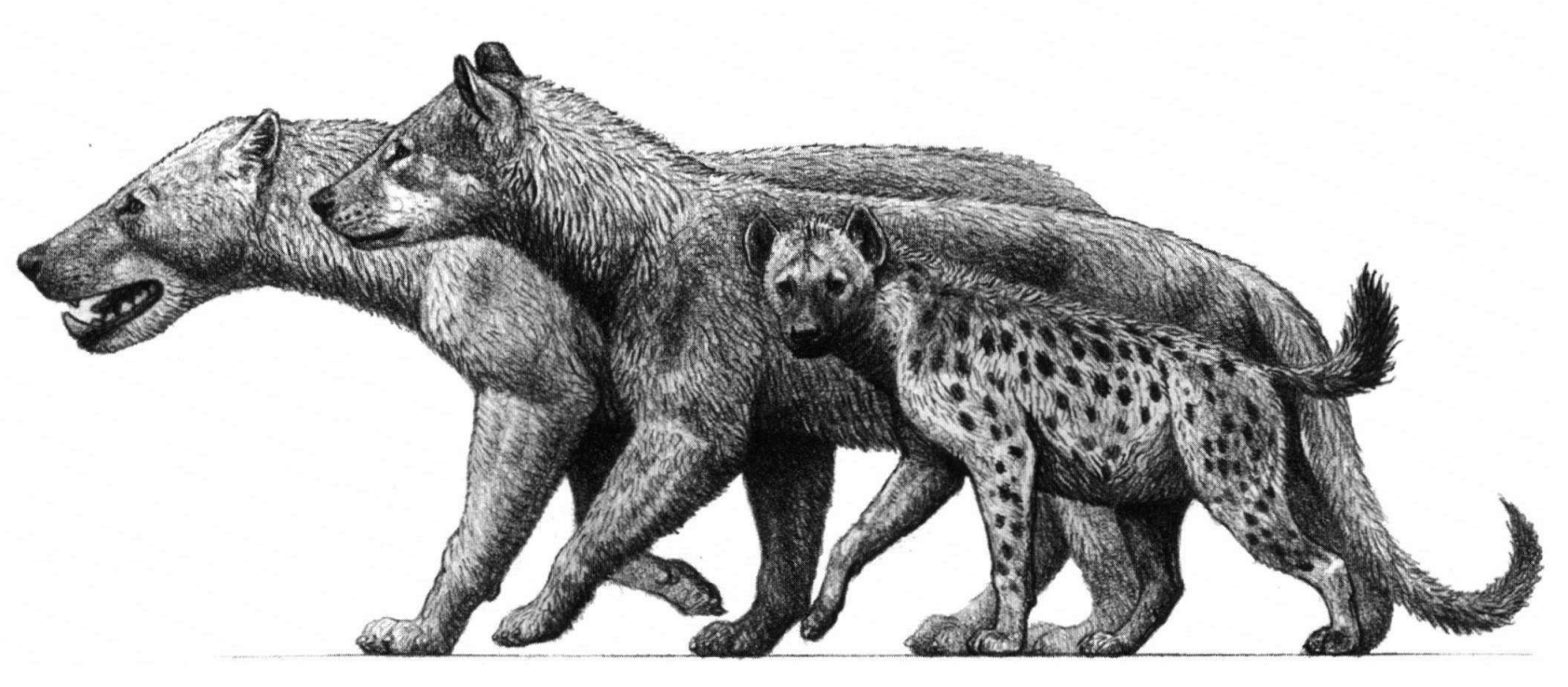
Size comparison of Hyainailouros sulzeri, Amphicyon giganteus and Crocuta crocuta

Amphicyon was a large to very large predator, although the various species differ considerably in size, ranging from moderately sized species such as A. astrei to the huge A. ingens, which was one of the biggest carnivorans of all time. The estimated weight of male A. major is 212 kg, while females are smaller, at only 122 kg, indicating significant sexual dimorphism. The shoulder height of a young female, which has been estimated to have weighed 125 kg, has been reconstructed as 65 cm. As the largest Old World species of the genus, A. giganteus was considerably larger, with females weighing 157 kg and males 317 kg, although they may have grown even greater sizes. The mass of several other European species has been estimated craniodental measurements, which generally falls into the range of estimations derived from postcranial remains, although it may slightly overestimate their weight. A. astrei is the smallest species, estimated at 112 kg, while A. laugnacensis and A. lactorensis were somewhat larger, at ~130 kg and 132 kg, respectively. A. olisiponensis is estimated at 147 kg and A. carnutense as 182 kg, while A. eppelsheimensis and A. gutmanni are among the biggest members of the genus, with estimated weights of 225 and 246 kg. The North American species of the genus show a considerable size increase over the course of their evolution, with the earliest one, A. galushai, being estimated at 187 kg, whereas A. frendens was considerably larger, at 432 kg. Finally, the terminal North American species, A. ingens, was among the largest of all amphicyonids, with an estimated body mass of 550 kg.

Its skeleton showcases a variety of features resembling canids, ursids and felids. Amphicyon possessed a powerful skull, with a long snout and high sagittal crests. The canines are robust, and the posterior molars are enlarged, whereas the anterior premolars are reduced. Its neck is wide, similar to that of a bear. Its postcranial skeleton is stout and robust, with massive, powerful limbs, and mobile shoulder joints as well as flexible wrists. The upper limb bones are comparatively long in comparison to the lower ones, and it did not possess any adaption towards cursoriality. Its posture was more similar to plantigrade taxa such as ursids than to digitgrade ones like felids, and their claws were not retractable. Amphicyon also had a rather flexible back, and a heavy tail, which has been estimated to have possessed as many as 28 caudal vertebrae, and may have been as long as the rest of the spine.

== Palaeobiology ==
=== Diet and predatory behaviour ===
The diet of Amphicyon has proven difficult to reconstruct, as its dentition possesses both crushing and shearing functions. It has been proposed, on the basis of dental wear patterns and morphology, that European species of this genus were bone-crushing mesocarnivores. One study argued that A. longiramus was hypercarnivorous, as the relative grinding area of its lower molars is similar to that of carnivorous canids, whereas another suggested that the North American species of the genus were omnivores. A dental microwear analysis of A. major recovers the diet of this species as mesocarnivorous, similar to red foxes, consuming meat as well as plants and hard items, which presumably included bone. Another dental microwear analysis also supports an omnivorous diet for A. giganteus, whose dentition possesses a high number of large pits and several small pits, and notes that it clearly differs from bone-crushing taxa such as hyaenas. As both its anterior premolars and posterior molars are reduced, A. olisiponensis may have been more hypercarnivorous than other European species.

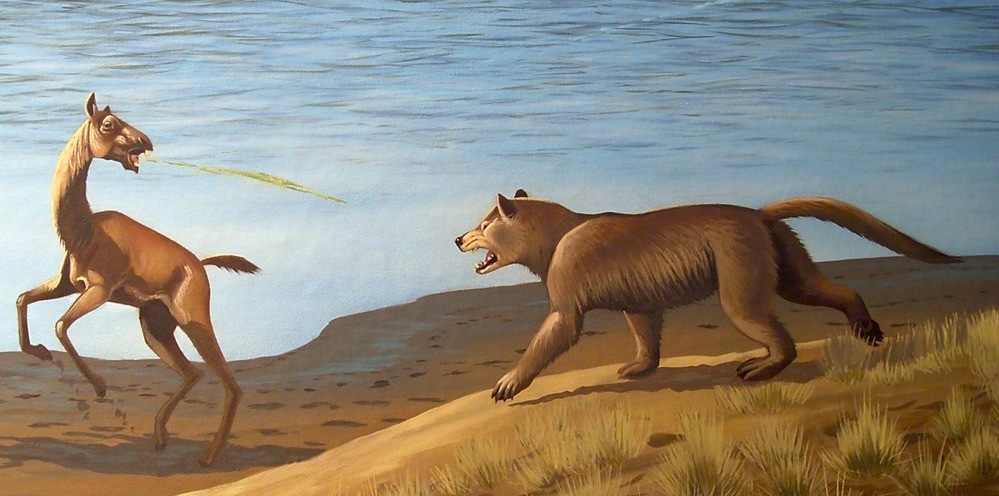
Amphicyon attacking Miolabis

As it lacked the adaptations for rapid acceleration, Amphicyon seems to have hunted quite unlike lions and tigers, which approach their prey very closely, before overtaking it after a quick burst of speed. However, as even modern pursuit predators such as wolves stalk and ambush their prey, it is likely that Amphicyon did the same. It has been proposed that it pursued its prey for longer distances, and at a speed notably slower than modern wolves. After catching up to its victim, it was likely able to immobilize it with its powerful forelimbs. Its postscapular fossa indicates a well-developed subscapularis minor muscle, which fixes the shoulder joint, and prevents the head of the humerus from being dislocated by the struggles of a prey animal trying to break free. The anatomy of its humerus also supports this, as it showcases the presence of a strong pronator teres muscle, and thereby pronation of the forearm, and powerful flexors of digits and wrists, which are integral to the prey-grasping ability of both extant bears and big cats. Indeed, the trochlea of its humeral condyle is shallower than that of a tiger, suggesting that the pronation/supination of its forearms might have been even greater than in large felids, although it likely lacked the ability of cats to retract their claws. Its small infraorbital foramina indicates that it lacked the well-developed vibrissae of cats, which provides them with the sensory information needed to place a precise killing bite. Therefore, it may have killed its prey by tearing open the preys ribcage, as thylacines did, or by biting into its neck to sever major blood vessels. Just like modern predators, it likely did not target its preys abdomen, as wounds in that area do not kill quickly. As the elongation of its distal limb segments was more similar to that of the solitary tiger than to the social lion, Amphicyon was likely solitary as well. Due to its comparatively slow maximum speed and lack of rapid acceleration, it is unlikely that Amphicyon preyed on cursorial ungulates. However, it has been proposed that its pursuit capabilities were suited to chase mediportal ungulates, such as merycoidodontids and rhinoceroses. A specimen of the rhinoceros Prosantorhinus douvillei was discovered with bitemarks corresponding to those of A. giganteus, although it remains unclear if this was the result of active predation or merely scavenging of remains. Other bitemarks referred to the species A. olisiponensis were found on a metapodial belonging to the large anthracothere Brachyodus onoideus. Bite traces on various mammalian long bones from the Early Miocene of Czechia have also been attributed to Amphicyon. As patterned bones have no immediate benefit for feeding, they likely represent evidence of active predation.

=== Sexual dimorphism ===
Strong sexual dimorphism is present in a variety of species, known from both Europe and North America, with the males being considerably larger than the females. Although this size difference is present in many amphicyonids, it is more strongly developed in Amphicyon than in Cynelos lemanensis. The males furthermore possess slightly longer and more robust snouts, larger canines and immense sagittal crests. Comparison with other strongly sexually dimorphic carnivorans suggests that Amphicyon was polygynous, with territorial males competing with each other for females during the mating season. This may have contributed to the size increase observed within the genus.

=== Possible footprints ===
Footprints assigned to the ichnotaxon Hirpexipes alfi were discovered in the Californian Barstow Formation, and match the feet of A. ingens. They showcase that the animal was semidigitigrade to semiplantigrade, and possessed long and sharp claws. Hiripex means "rake", and references the long, flexible digits of the foot, which reminded the authors of the prongs of leaf rakes.

Another ichnotaxon associated with Amphicyon is Platykopus maxima from the Hungarian Early Miocene locality Ipolytarnóc. The footprints were attributed to A. major on the basis of their size and short phalanges.

== Fossil distribution ==
Fossil remains of Amphicyon are most common in Western and Central Europe, where they were discovered in various countries, including France, Germany, Spain and Hungary, but were also found in Bosnia-Herzegovina and Turkey. A. astrei is the oldest known species, and may have been the ancestor of the later members of the genus, and is known from the earliest Miocene of France. Species belonging to the A. giganteus lineage appeared shortly afterwards, and are common in Europe until MN6, which corresponds to 13.7 to 12.75 Ma. However, this species is also known from Turkey, where it was found in the Karacalar locality, which dates to 11.6 ± 0.25 Ma, indicating that it survived in Anatolia after it had already disappeared in Europe. Throughout the Middle Miocene of Europe, it was sympatric with the considerably smaller A. major, although the two species were likely ecologically or environmentally separated. While common throughout the continent during the Middle Miocene, amphicyonid diversity decreased following the Vallesian Turnover, with the last known European species of the genus surviving in Central Europe until MN11, which dates from 8.7 to 7.75 Ma.

While various remains and species of Amphicyon have been reported from South and East Asia, their referral is often problematic, as they're usually known from fragmentary material and all large sized amphicyonids found on the continent are generally placed in this genus. The only species definitely belonging to this genus is A. zhanxiangi from the middle Miocene of China. Other, tentatively assigned, species of this genus are known from China throughout the early Middle Miocene, but disappear by the late Miocene. It has been suggested that there were at least three dispersal events from European Amphicyon into Eastern Asia, with the first one being the ancestors of the North American species, the second one dating to the Early Miocene or earliest Middle Miocene, leading to A. zhanxiangi, and the last one, that of the A. ulungurensis lineage, which occurred slightly later. There was generally no closer affinity between the Chinese amphicyonids and those of the Indian Subcontinent during the middle Miocene. However, it has been proposed that the late Miocene A. lydekkeri from Pakistan, which is sometimes assigned to the separate genus Arctamphicyon, is a descendant of A. zhanxiangi, with the lineage immigrating from Northern China to Southern Asia. Further remains showcasing affinities with these species are also known from Yunnan, and their dispersal might be linked to the uplifting of the Tibetan Plateau and the strengthening of the Asian Monsoon. The attribution of the various Amphicyon species described from the South Asian Siwaliks is similarly questionable, as is the validity of the individual species. They are found throughout the whole Miocene epoch, with A. shahbazi being known from the earliest Miocene, whereas remains of A. lydekkeri date to the latest Miocene (~7-5 Ma), making it one of the youngest amphicyonids known. A very large humerus from the Manchar formation indicates that a gigantic species was present in the Siwaliks during the early parts of the Middle Miocene. South East Asian reports include a large incisor from the Aquitanian (~23-21 Ma) of Vietnam, and a species from the Lower Irrawaddy Formation of Myanmar, which is likely closely related to Arctamphicyon. Fossils from MN 7 of Kazakhstan, found in association with Anchitherium, have also been assigned to Amphicyon. Scarce dental remains have furthermore been reported from the Saudi Arabian Dam Formation, which dates to ca 17-15 Ma, in 1982. These remains show morphological differences to A. major, and several of the species to which it had been compared, mostly because of their similar, small size, including A. bohemicus, A. styriacus and A. steinheimensis (which also shares the apomorphic features present in the Arabian taxon), have since been moved to other genera.

The only definitive African remains of Amphicyon are from Arrisdrift in Namibia, which has variously been dated to 17.5 Ma or 16 Ma, and belong to the species A. giganteus. Further remains from this species have also been reported from the slightly older locality Moghra in Egypt, and it has been suggested that a mandible from Gebel Zelten, which is of similar age, in Libya indicates the presence of another, smaller species of the genus in the early Miocene of Africa. However, other authors assign these fossils to Afrocyon and Mogharacyon, respectively. Much younger remains of large, African amphicyonids have previously been referred to Amphicyon. Most notable among these are a molar and fragmentary postcranial remains from the Lower Nawatwa Formation, dating to 7.4 ± 0.1 – 6.5 ± 0.1 Ma, which represents one of the youngest amphicyonids known. Others tentatively refer this taxon to the genus Myacyon.

The migration of Amphicyon from Eurasia to North America was part of a trans-Beringian faunal exchange between the two continents during the Early Miocene. The oldest North American member of the genus is A. galushai, which first appeared between 18.8 and 18.2 Ma. It likely gave rise to the larger A. frendens, which itself was ancestral to the huge A. ingens, which was also the last North American member of the genus, disappearing around 14.2 Ma. This lineage was probably endemic to North America, and is mostly known from the Great Plains, although remains of A. ingens were also discovered in California and New Mexico. Another species, A. longiramus, is known from the Thomas Farm Site of Florida, which dates to ca. 18 Ma, and possibly the Pollack Farm Local Fauna of Delaware, as well as the Texan Garvin Gully fauna, which are of similar age. The relationship of this species to the Great Plains lineage is unclear.
