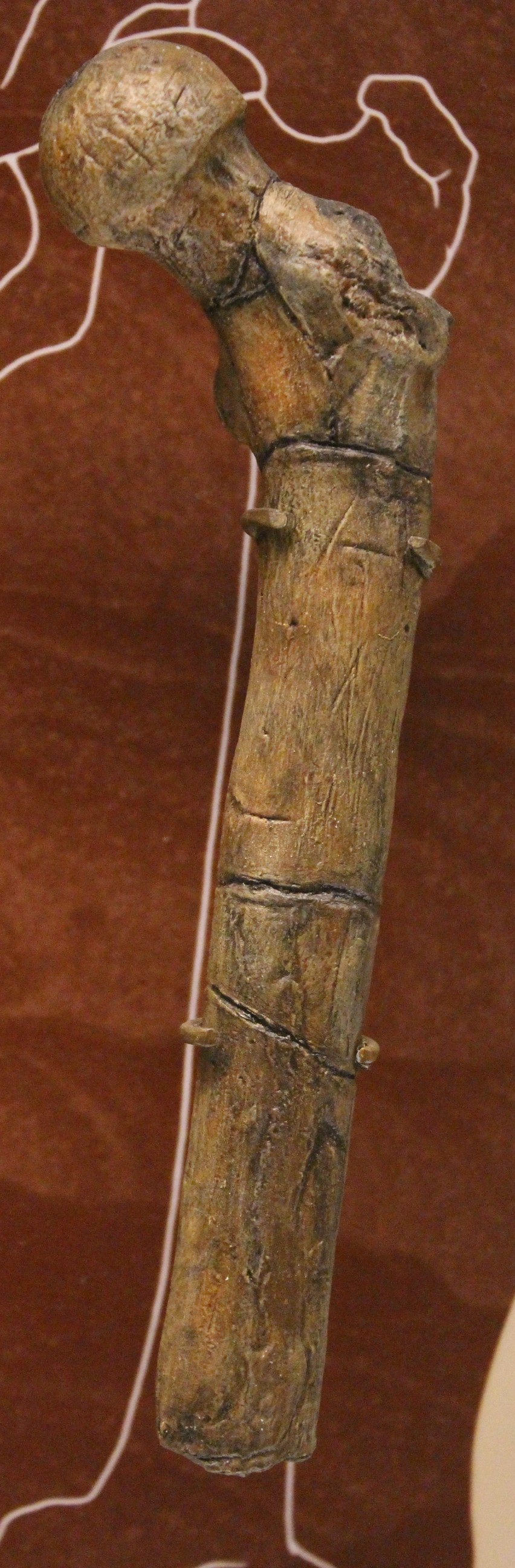
- Cast of O. tugenensis femur (BAR 1002'00), National Museum of Natural History
- The distal phalanx of the thumb of O. tugenensis

Scientific classification
- Kingdom: Animalia
- Phylum: Chordata
- Class: Mammalia
- Order: Primates
- Superfamily: Hominoidea
- Family: Hominidae
- Subfamily: Homininae
- Tribe: Hominini
- Genus: †Orrorin; Senut et al. 2001

Type species
- †Orrorin tugenensis Senut et al., 2001

Other species
- †O. praegens (Ferguson, 1989)

Synonyms
- Homo antiquus praegens Ferguson, 1989

= Orrorin =

Orrorin Temporal range: Late Miocene-Pliocene, 6.1–4.5 Ma

Postulated early hominin discovered in Kenya

Orrorin is an extinct genus of great ape within the tribe of Hominini from the Miocene Lukeino Formation and Pliocene Mabaget Formation, both of Kenya.

The type species is O. tugenensis, named in 2001, and a second species, O. praegens, was assigned to the genus in 2022.

== Discovery and naming ==
=== Orrorin tugenensis ===
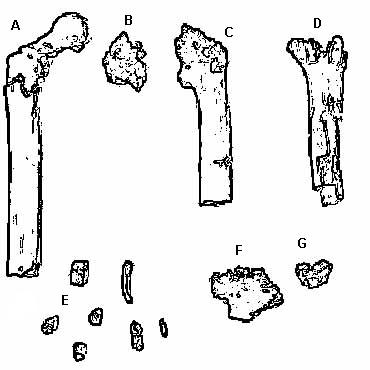
The holotype of O. tugenensis

The first part of the holotype, a lower molar, was discovered by Martin Pickford in 1974 and described by Pickford (1975).

The team that found the rest of the holotype of O. tugenensis was led by Brigitte Senut and Martin Pickford from the French National Museum of Natural History. Starting from 17 October 2000, 20 fossils were found at four sites in the Lukeino Formation, Kenya: of these, the fossils at Cheboit and Aragai are the oldest (6.1 Ma), while those in Kapsomin and Kapcheberek are found in the upper levels of the formation (5.7 Ma).

Orrorin tugenensis was named and described by Senut et al. (2001).

=== Orrorin praegens ===
The second species, O. praegens, was first described by Ward (1985) and Ward & Hill (1988), and was initially described as Homo antiquus praegens by Ferguson (1989) based on specimen KNM-TH 13150, a mandible discovered in the Pliocene Mabaget Formation of Kenya during the early 1980s. The mandible is known as the Tabarin mandible, which was previously classified within Ardipithecus ramidus (or cf. A. cf. ramidus), "Ardipithecus" praegens or "Praeanthropus" praegens.

Several referred remains of O. praegens were collected between 2005 and 2011 by the Franco-Kenyan Kenya Palaeontology Expedition and they, alongside the Tabarin mandible, were classified by Pickford et al. (2022) as being separate from Homo, so they were classified within Orrorin as O. praegens.

== Etymology ==
The name of genus Orrorin (plural Orroriek) means "original man" in Tugen, and the epithet of O. tugenensis derives from Tugen Hills in Kenya, where the first fossil was found in 2000.

The epithet of O. praegens means roughly “group of people who came before.”

== Fossils ==
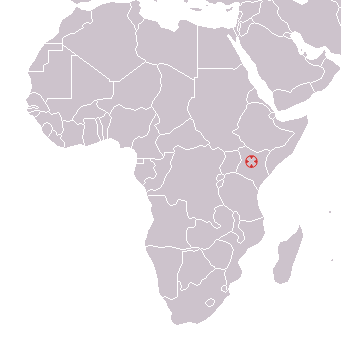
Location of discovery

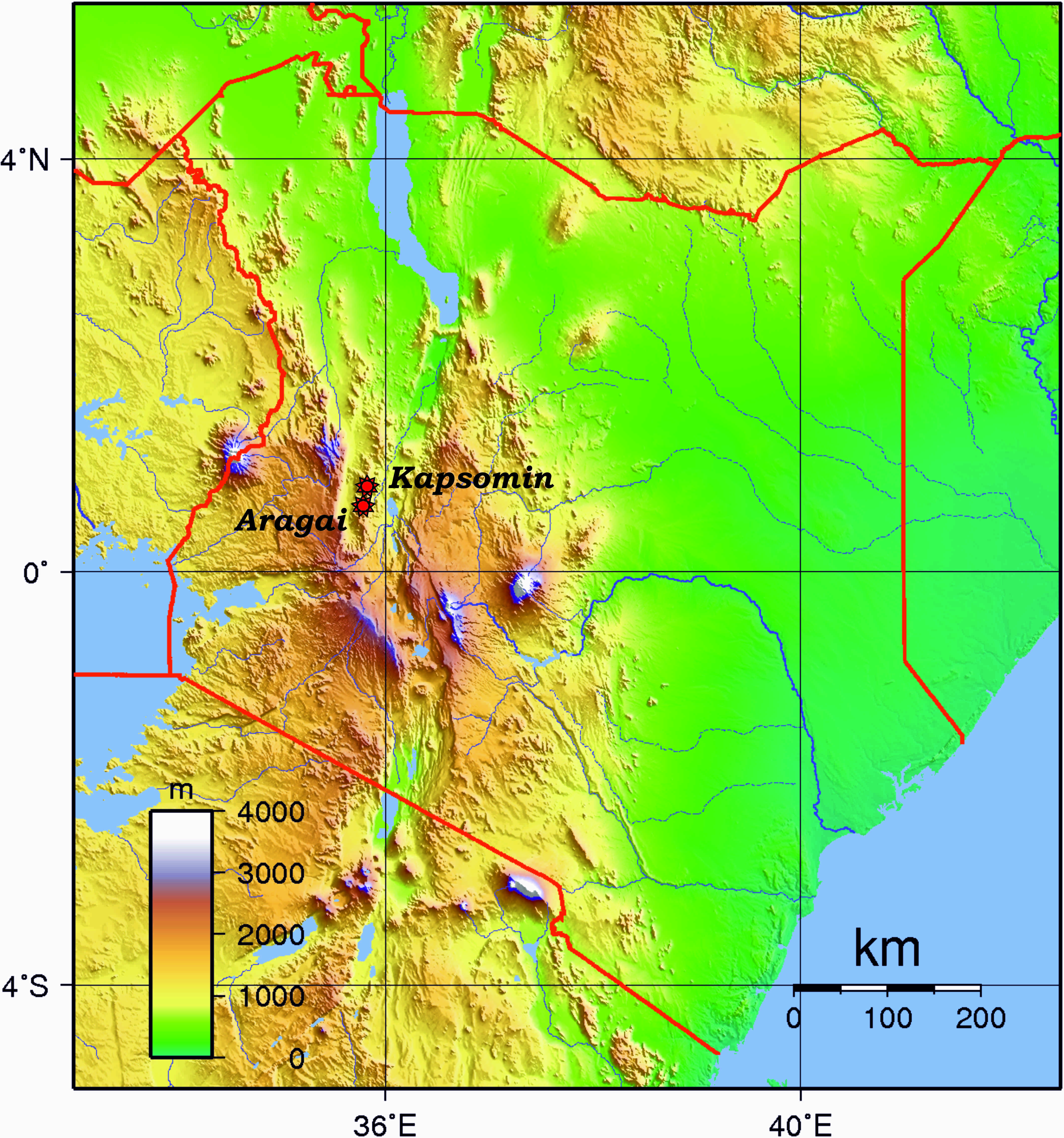
Map detail

The 20 specimens belonging to O. tugenensis are believed to be from at least five individuals. They include: the posterior part of a mandible in two pieces; a symphysis and several isolated teeth; three fragments of femora; a partial humerus; a proximal phalanx; and a distal thumb phalanx.

Orrorin had small teeth relative to its body size. Its dentition differs from that found in Australopithecus in that its cheek teeth are smaller and less elongated mesiodistally and from Ardipithecus in that its enamel is thicker. The dentition differs from both these species in the presence of a mesial groove on the upper canines. The canines are ape-like but reduced, like those found in Miocene apes and female chimpanzees. Orrorin had small post-canines and was microdont, like modern humans, whereas australopithecines were megadont. However, some researchers have denied that this is compelling evidence that Orrorin was more closely related to modern humans than australopithecines as early members of the genus Homo, who were almost certainly the direct ancestors of modern humans, were also megadonts.

In the femur, the head is spherical and rotated anteriorly; the neck is elongated and oval in section and the lesser trochanter protrudes medially. While these suggest that Orrorin was bipedal, the rest of the postcranium indicates it climbed trees. While the proximal phalanx is curved, the distal pollical phalanx is of human proportions and has thus been associated with toolmaking, but should probably be associated with grasping abilities useful for tree-climbing in this context.

After the fossils were found in 2000, they were held at the Kipsaraman village community museum, but the museum was subsequently closed. Since then, according to the Community Museums of Kenya chairman Eustace Kitonga, the fossils are stored at a secret bank vault in Nairobi.

In 2017, impressions resembling human-like footprints were reported on the island of Crete in Greece. These "Trachilos footprints", found in fossilized beach sediments near the west Cretan village of Trachilos, have been dated to a similar time period as Orrorin tugenensis, being 6.05 million years old. However, there is no consensus that these impressions are distinct enough to confidently assign to a primate or even a vertebrate, or that they are indeed footprints at all.

Hominin timeline
← / Earlier apes; ← / Gorilla split; ← / Chimpanzee split; ← / Earliest bipedal; ← / Earliest sign of Ardipithecus; ← / Earliest sign of Australopithecus; ← / Earliest stone tools; ← / Earliest sign of Homo; ← / Dispersal beyond Africa; ← / Earliest fire / cooking; ← / Earliest rock art; ← / Earliest clothes; ← / Modern humans
(million years ago)

== Classification ==
If Orrorin proves to be a direct human ancestor, then according to some paleoanthropologists, australopithecines such as Australopithecus afarensis ("Lucy") may be considered a side branch of the hominid family tree: Orrorin is both earlier, by almost 3 million years, and more similar to modern humans than is A. afarensis. The main similarity is that the Orrorin femur is morphologically closer to that of Homo sapiens than is Lucy's; there is, however, some debate over this point. This debate is largely centered around the fact that Lucy was female and the Orrorin femur it has been compared to belonged to a male.

Another point of view cites comparisons between Orrorin and other Miocene apes, rather than extant great apes, which shows instead that the femur shows itself as an intermediate between that of Australopiths and said earlier apes.

Other fossils (leaves and many mammals) found in the Lukeino Formation show that Orrorin lived in a dry evergreen forest environment, not the savanna assumed by many theories of human evolution.

== Evolution of bipedalism ==
The fossils of Orrorin tugenensis share no derived features of hominoid great-ape relatives. In contrast, Orrorin shares several apomorphic features with modern humans, as well as some with australopithecines, including the presence of an obturator externus groove, elongated femoral neck, anteriorly twisted head (posterior twist in Australopithecus), anteroposteriorly compressed femoral neck, asymmetric distribution of cortex in the femoral neck, shallow superior notch, and a well developed gluteal tuberosity which coalesces vertically with the crest that descends the femoral shaft posteriorly. It does, however, also share many of such properties with several Miocene ape species, even showing some transitional elements between basal apes like the Aegyptopithecus and Australopithecus.

According to recent studies Orrorin tugenensis is a basal hominid that adapted an early form of bipedalism. Based on the structure of its femoral head it still exhibited some arboreal properties, likely to forage and build shelters. The length of the femoral neck in Orrorin tugenensis fossils is elongated and is similar in shape and length to modern humans and Australopithicines. While it was originally claimed that its femoral head is larger in comparison to australopithicines and is much closer in shape and relative size to Homo sapiens, this claim has been challenged by some researchers who have noted that the femoral heads of male australopithicines are more akin to those of Orrorin, and by extension modern humans, than those of female australopithicines. Proponents of the notion that Orrorin is more closely related to humans than Lucy is have addressed this by asserting that the male australopithicine femurs in question in fact belong to a different species than Lucy. O. tugenensis appears to have developed bipedalism 6 million years ago.

O. tugenensis shares an early hominin feature in which their iliac blade is flared to help counter the torque of their body weight; this shows that they adapted bipedalism around 6 MYA. These features are shared with many species of Australopithecus. It has been suggested by Pickford that the many features Orrorin shares with modern humans show that it is more closely related to Homo sapiens than to Australopithecus. This would mean that Australopithecus would represent a side branch in the homin evolution that does not directly lead to Homo. However, the femora morphology of O. tugenensis shares many similarities with australopithicine femora morphology, which weakens this claim. Another study conducted by Almecija suggested that Orrorin is more closely related to early hominins than to Homo. An analysis of the BAR 10020' 00 femur showed that Orrorin is an intermediate between Pan and Australopithecus afarensis. The current prevailing theory is that Orrorin tugenensis is a basal hominin and that bipedalism developed early in the hominin clade and successfully evolved down the human evolutionary tree. While the phylogeny of Orrorin is uncertain, the evidence of the evolution of bipedalism is an invaluable discovery from this early fossil hominin. A recent phylogenetic analysis also recovered Orrorin as a hominin.

== See also ==
- List of human evolution fossils (with images)

== Sources ==
- CogWeb. "Orrorin Tugenensis: Pushing back the hominin line". UCLA.
- Haviland, William A.; Prins, Harald E. L.; Walrath, Dana; McBride, Bunny (2007). Evolution and prehistory: the human challenge. Cengage Learning. ISBN 978-0-495-38190-7.
- Senut, Brigitte (2007). "6 the Earliest Putative Hominids". In Henke, Winfried; Hardt, Thorolf; Tattersall, Ian (eds.). Handbook of Paleoanthropology. pp. 1519–1538. doi:10.1007/978-3-540-33761-4_49. ISBN 978-3-540-32474-4.
- Pickford, Martin (December 2001). "Martin Pickford answers a few questions about this month's fast breaking paper in field of Geosciences". Essential Science Indicators. Archived from the original on 2002-06-02.
- Senut, Brigitte; Pickford, Martin; Gommery, Dominique; Mein, Pierre; Cheboi, Kiptalam; Coppens, Yves (January 2001). "First hominid from the Miocene (Lukeino Formation, Kenya)". Comptes Rendus de l'Académie des Sciences, Série IIA. 332 (2): 137–144. Bibcode:2001CRASE.332..137S. doi:10.1016/S1251-8050(01)01529-4. S2CID 14235881.
