= Bonisicyon =

Bonisicyon Temporal range: Messinian, ~6.5–5.3 Ma

Scientific classification
- Kingdom: Animalia
- Phylum: Chordata
- Class: Mammalia
- Order: Carnivora
- Family: †Amphicyonidae
- Subfamily: †Amphicyoninae
- Genus: †Bonisicyon; Werdelin and Simpson, 2009

Type species
- †Bonisicyon illacabo Werdelin and Simpson, 2009

Extinct genus of carnivoran mammals

Bonisicyon is an extinct genus of carnivoran mammals, belonging to the family Amphicyonidae ("bear dogs"). It is the last-surviving member of its family, living in East Africa during the end of the Miocene epoch. Known only from a damaged mandible and isolated teeth from the Nawata Formation, and possibly also the Lukeino Formation, its closer taxonomic affinities are unclear. It is notable for both its small size, and its unique dentition.

== History and naming ==
The first published material belonging to this genus includes a broken mandibular ramus with a damaged m1 and alveoli for m2 and m3, as well as roots for p4, from the Upper Nawata Formation in Lothagam, Kenya. Bonisicyon was described on basis of material found at Gona, Ethiopia, with a right m1 (HMD1/P11) serving as holotype. Other described material includes an isolated left m2 and a damaged right M2. A M1 from Lemudong'o, Kenya, originally referred to the ailurid Simocyon, has also been tentatively attributed to the genus. A P4 discovered at the Kenyan Lukeino Formation has also been proposed to belong to an amphicyonid, as both its age and dimensions are similar to Bonisicyon.

The genus is named in honour of Dr Louis de Bonis, whereas illacabo is the Afar word for (as in "the end of the story").

== Description ==
Bonisicyon is a rather small amphicyonid. Its body mass has been estimated at 33 kg based on tooth size, though this is likely an overestimation. The relatively slender mandible, and similarities in tooth size to a coyote, suggest that its mass was closer to 20 kg than 30 kg.

The robust m1 is relatively wide at the base of its crown, and possesses an entirely mesiodistal carnassial shear. The tall hypoconid is formed into an elongated crest, and is effectively part of the carnassial shear, only separated from the trigonid by a narrow postvallid notch, which is morphologically similar to the carnassial notch. The trigonid consists of a well-developed paraconid and protoconid, and a reduced metaconid, which is only evidenced as a bulge on the lingual side of the protoconid. The almost entirely mesiodistal carnassial shear only has a very slight angle between paraconid and protoconid. All these features suggest that Bonisicyon was a hypercarnivore. However, it lacks several features usually associated with such a diet, such as taller trigonid cuspids and a shortened talonid. Indeed, the trigonid is relatively short and its cuspids blunt. Therefore, its dentition possesses a peculiar mix of hypercarnivorous and mesocarnivorous features, although the narrowness of the tooth means it lacks a proper crushing basin, therefore pointing towards hypercarnivory.

Other notable features include the paraconid, which is much lower and mesodistally shorter than the tall protoconid, and possesses a very short cristid. The well-developed preprotocristid is expanded slightly dorsally roughly midway between the tooth's apex and the carnassial notch. The postprotocristid is much more vertically oriented in comparison, meeting the talonid at the posterior carnassial notch. The talonid is about half as long as the trigonid, and is dominated by the hypocinid, which is about ⅔ the height of the protoconid and almost reaches the length of the directly distally located protoconid. Elongated into a cristid, it runs the entire length of the talonid and ends in a nearly vertical face dropping to the distal end of the tooth. The talonids lingual part consists of a lingual cristid, which is separated from the hypoconid by a narrow, shallow groove. The two roots are about equally long mesiodistally, although the posterior is perhaps slightly longer. It lacks a basal cingulum, possessing only a modest out-bulging of the enamel. Both the m2 and M1 are very similar to other small and medium-sized amphicyonids.

The m1 of Bonisicyon shares several features with that of Afrocyon, such as the relatively short talonid and reduced metaconid. However, Afrocyon differs in its very tall and relatively transversely thin mandibular ramus and elongated m2. Bonisicyon lacks the peculiar m1 of Myacyon dojambir, and numerous features differentiate it from the similarly sized ?M. peignei. Among these are its taller, more bulbous, but less trenchant paraconid, lower and blunter protoconid and reduced metaconid. In both size and shape, it is most similar to Cynelos/Hecubides euryodon. Their M1 is almost indistinguishable, and their m2 are very similar, although C. euryodon has a less developed metaconid and a more cusp-like hypoconid. Their m1 too shares many similarities, although most of these are shared, primitive characteristics. In comparison, Bonisicyon possesses a much more developed hypoconid and paraconid, a reduced metaconid and a distinct, sharp notch between protoconid and hypoconid.

== Classification ==
By the Late Miocene, the diversity of the Amphicyonidae was decreasing, likely as a result of the Vallesian Crisis, which resulted in the spread of open habitats at the cost of woodlands, and therefore a decline of forest-dwelling species. The last North American amphicyonids disappeared around 9 Ma while poorly known species such as Amphicyon pannonicus survived in Europe until MN11-MN12. Two further obscure taxons (Amphicyon lydekkeri and Amphicyon palaeindicus) from the Indian Subcontinent have been reported to be of Messinian age. If so, they are of similar age to Bonisicyon. However, it has been pointed out that these remains are not securely dated. A recent overview of Siwalik faunas does not include A. palaeindicus in faunal lists that are younger than Vallesian age, whereas A. lydekkeri is reported from the locality Hasnot, which is dated to ca. 7–5.3 Ma. Besides Bonisicyon, a further amphicyonid is known from Lothagam, although from the stratigraphically older Lower Nawata Formation (dating to 7.4 ± 0.1 – 6.5 ± 0.1 Ma). Like most amphicyonids known from the Late Miocene of Africa, these remains have been tentatively assigned to the genus Myacyon. However, despite the geographical and temporal proximity, it shares no close relationship to Bonisicyon. Indeed, all these Late Miocene taxa are very large, in stark contrast to the comparatively small Bonisicyon, suggesting that they're only distantly related. In Europe, the last amphicyonids of similar size disappeared following MN5 (although the much smaller, omnivorous Pseudarctos survived until MN7/8). Some dental features, as well as the lack of any similar forms outside of Africa, suggest that Bonisicyon may be derived from African species of Cynelos (sometimes included in their own, separate genus Hecubides). However, there is a gap of nine million years between these forms, which means the usefulness of this argument is limited until intermediate forms are found. Therefore, Bonisicyon currently stands as a genus of unclear taxonomic affinities, unlike any other amphicyonid of the late Miocene. However, like other African amphicyonids it is included in the tribe Amphicyonini.

== Palaeoecology ==
The Upper Nawata, where the first fossils of Bonisicyon were found, was likely covered by a mixed, although rather open, environment. During this time period, a dry interval led to floodplain vegetation changing from tree savanna to dry or thornbush savanna. As all localities where remains of Bonisicyon were discovered were covered by such habitat, it has been suggested that may have successfully adapted to these new environments, unlike its larger relatives. If that was the case, competition with Eucyon (a medium-sized canid arriving in Africa around this time in Africa), which was better adapted to these environments, may have resulted in the extinction of this amphicyonid. However, more evidence, and especially postcranial remains, are needed to confirm this speculation.

At Lothagam, Bonisicyon shared its habitat with several other carnivorans, such as the machairodontines Lokotunjailurus and Dinofelis, the mustelid Erokomellivora and the hyaena Ictitherium, with which it may have competed for food. Among the small to medium-sized mammals on which it may have preyed are primates, like Parapapio, the aardvark Leptorycteropus, the tiny suid Cainochoerus as well as various rodents. Larger herbivores are represented by various proboscidean, among them Stegotetrabelodon, Anancus and Deinotherium, the hippopotamus Hexaprotodon, rhinos such as Brachypotherium and Ceratotherium, the equid Eurygnathohippus, the giraffe Palaeotragus, the suid Nyanzochoerus and a variety of bovids, including Aepyceros, Tragoportax, Kobus and Hippotragus.
