= Christine Tardieu =

French researcher

Christine Tardieu, born on 28 April 1949, in Boulogne-Billancourt, is a French researcher, paleontologist, and evolutionary biologist. She specializes in functional morphology and biomechanics, with a particular focus on the origin and progression of human bipedalism.

== Biography ==
Tardieu was born in Boulogne-Billancourt on 28 April 1949. In 1987, she presented her thesis titled "Development of a new computerized method for three-dimensional analysis of bipedal walking for the study of the displacements of the body's centers of gravity: application to humans and non-human primates". She specializes in functional morphology and biomechanics, with a particular focus on the origin and progression of human bipedalism. The psychosocial aspects of this evolution are significant in her research. Tardieu participated in research on Lucy with the French contingent studying it. Additionally, her research related to the fossils from the African Great Lakes and Ethiopia has allowed her to push back the date of hominid presence in this subregion. She collaborated with Brigitte Senut on these research projects.

In 1989, she received the Philip Morris Scientific Prize and the Bonnet Prize from the French Academy of Sciences. During this time, the researcher joined the National Center for Scientific Research (CNRS) and became a research director within the institution, while also starting to work for the National Museum of Natural History, within the comparative anatomy laboratory.

She appears in French media to share and explain her field of study.
