= Tugen Hills =

Hills in Kenya

Coordinates: 0.7529°N 35.8749°E

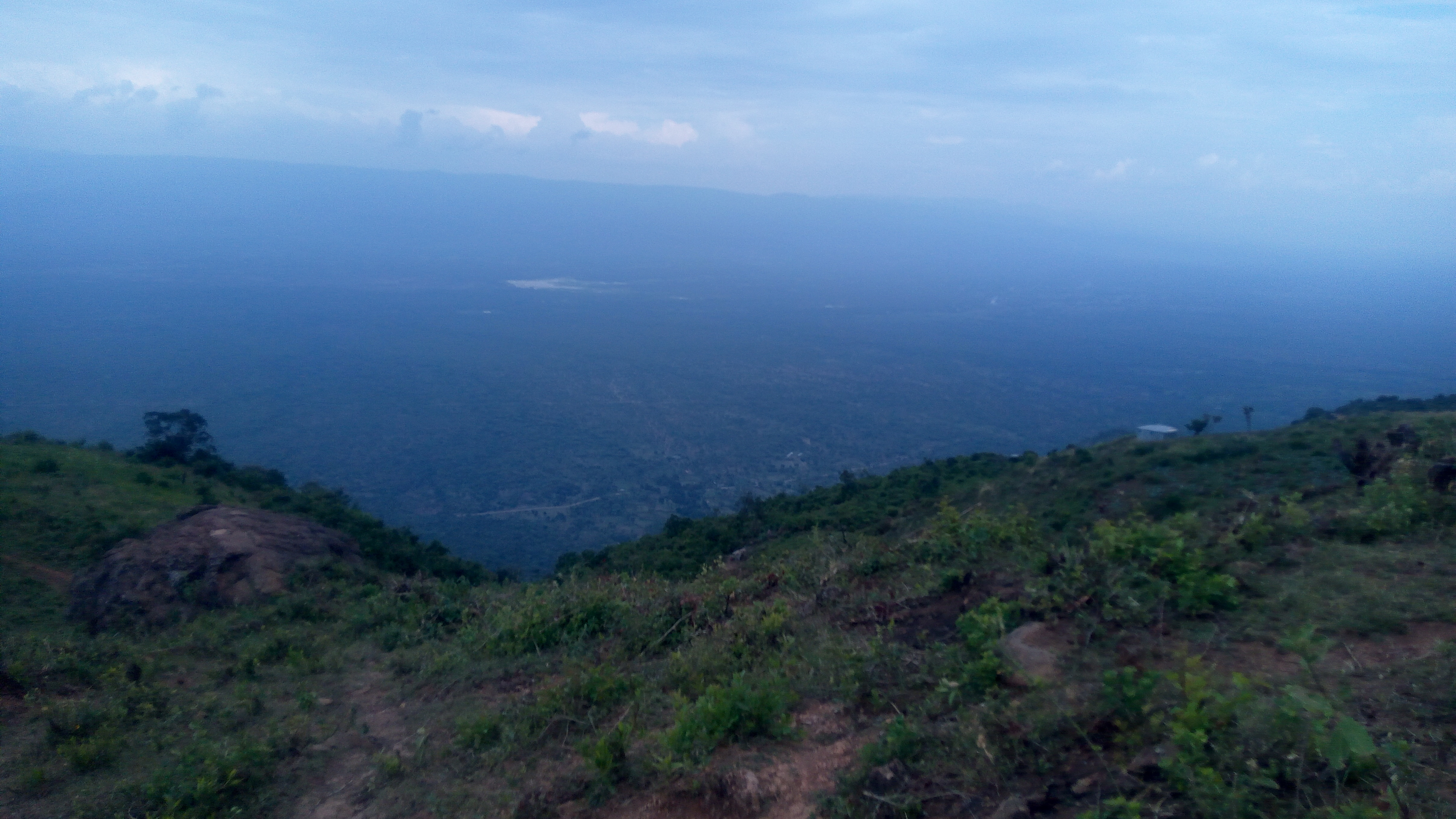
The Tugen Hills and Kerio Valley from Anin

The Tugen Hills (also known as Saimo) are a series of hills in Baringo County, Kenya. They are located in the central-western portion of Kenya. The Tugen Hills represent one of the few areas in Africa preserving a succession of deposits from the period of between 14 and 4 million years ago, making them an important location for the study of human (and animal) evolution. Excavations at the site conducted by Richard Leakey and others have yielded a complete skeleton of a 1.5-million-year-old elephant (1967), a new species of monkey (1969) and fossil remains of hominids from 1 to 2 million years ago. In 1974 Martin Pickford found a singular fossilised molar of a Orrorin tugenensis there, and that encouraged him to return 30 years later. In 1975, he named the fossilised finds Orrorin tugenensis, which means: “Original man of Tugen Hills”. This hominid lived from 6.2 MYA to 5.6 MYA.

Six-million-year-old hominid fossils were discovered here in 2000 by Brigitte Senut and Martin Pickford; the species was named Orrorin tugenensis after the location. This was the oldest hominid ever discovered in Kenya, and the second oldest in the world after Sahelanthropus tchadensis.

== Hominid fossils ==
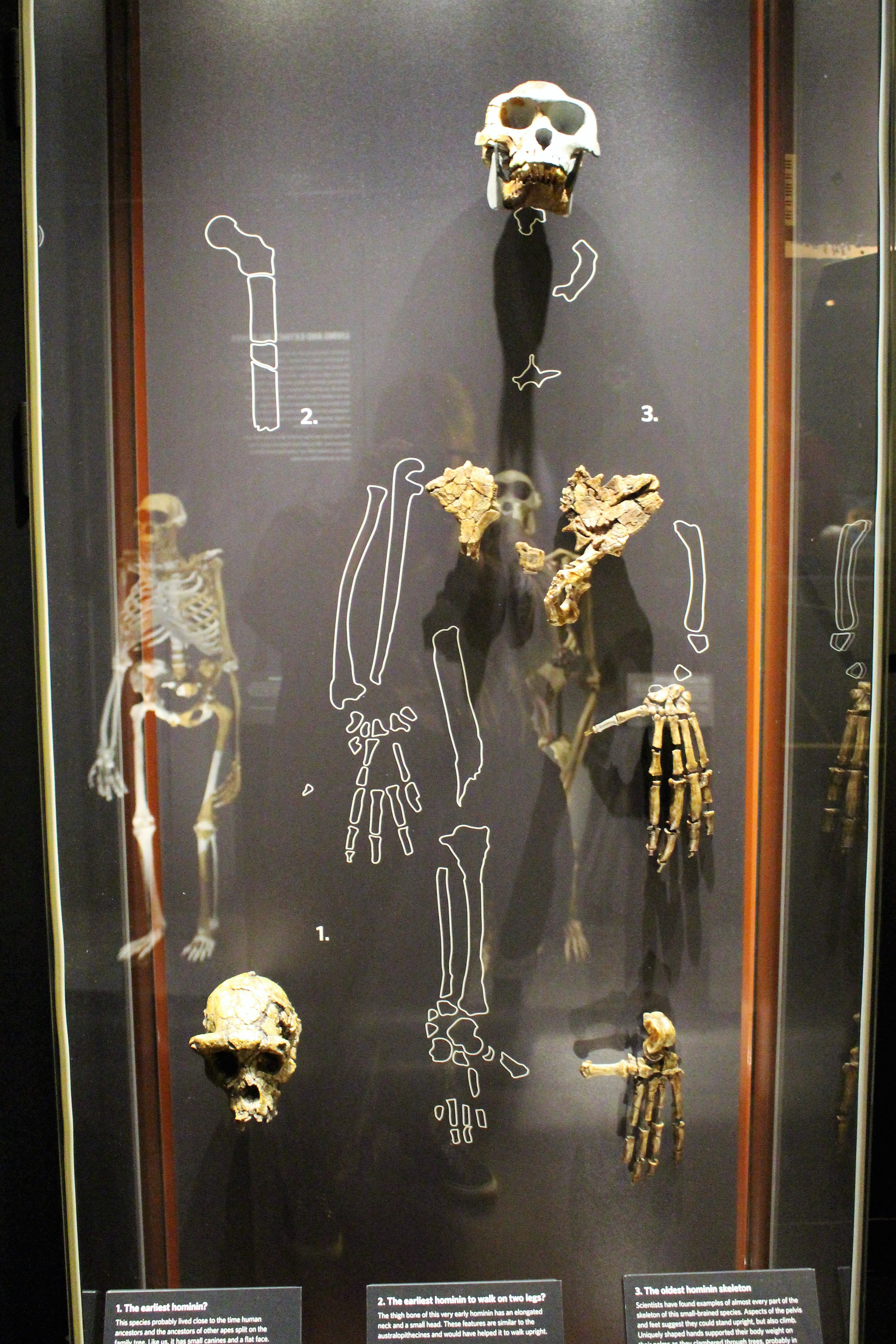

Due to the “Original man of Tugen Hills” in where it was inferred that it was the oldest hominid fossil ever found, said place holds a lot of crucial information regarding long term environmental change. The earth’s environment dating back to perhaps 14 million years ago can be examined through said deposits. The Tugen Hills is a necessary place of archeological excavation for ancestor primate understanding as well as overall understanding of Human evolution.

=== Evolutionary significance ===
Regarding the environment dating to the Miocene period, within the Tugen Hills the history of the East African Rift can be seen through tectonic plate movement and volcanic rocks. The Lukeino sediments formed through continued tectonic plate activity and the formation of basins is significant as that is where Orrorin was found. The Tugen Hills as previously mentioned has various fossil remains of hominids and ancestors to humans, apes and other primates. Specifically, Orrorin tugenensis was excavated at this specific archeological site, through this find various different ideas were concluded about the ancestors to the Human and Chimpanzee and Orangutan. Moreover “the Original man of Tugen Hills” has helped archeologists, anthropologists and scientists see the transition and divergence between what is the hominid and the ancient ape.

== Other primate fossils ==
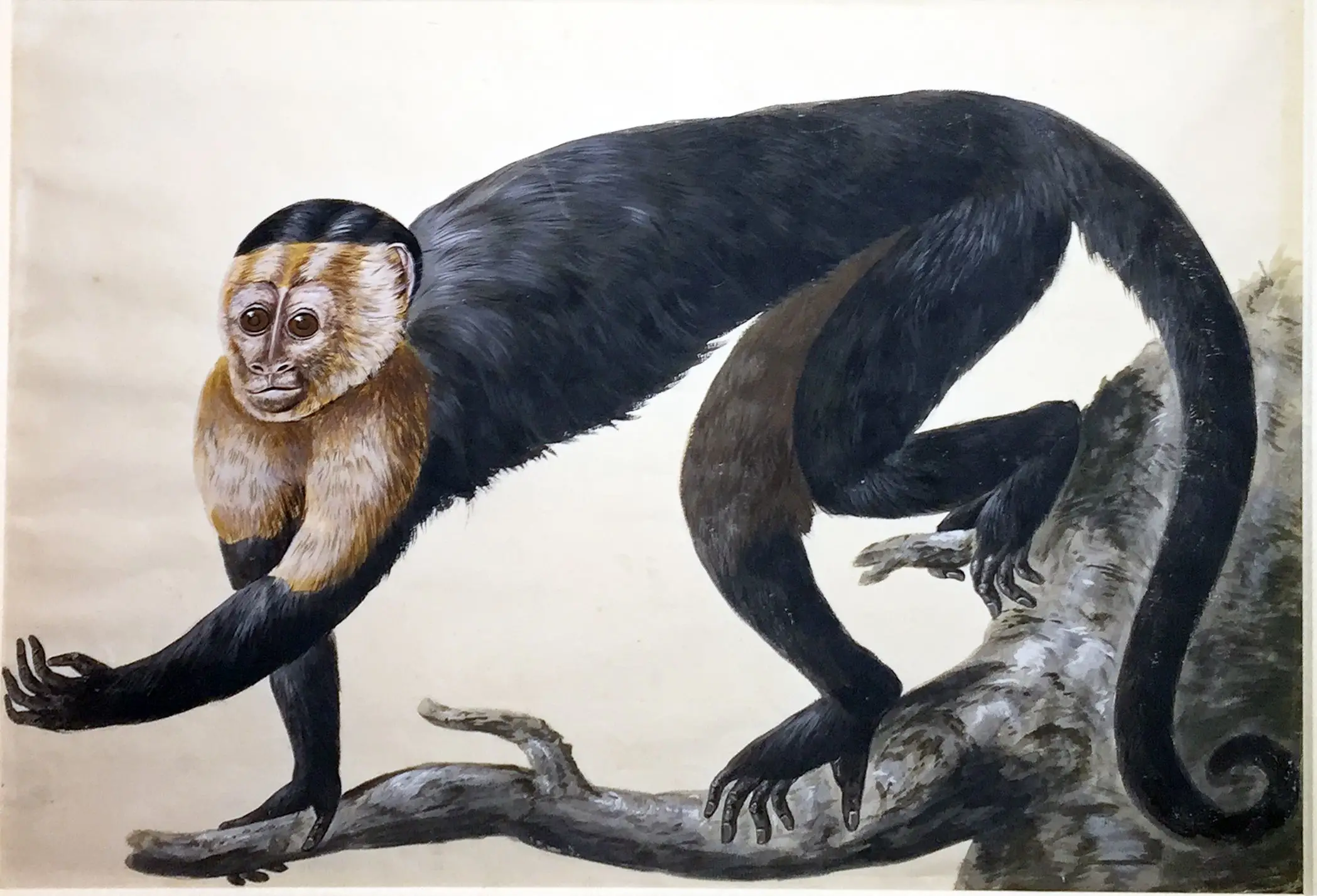

In said area, Old World monkey have also been found, excavated and examined. The early cercopithecoid monkeys of Kenya are another 12.5 million year old fossils that have helped understand evolution as well as the ancestral standing of modern monkeys and apes. Though much of the fossil record is poorly documented the Tugen Hills site at Kenya can be analyzed through the Pliocene and Pleistocene epochs; fossil record. Which dates from 12.5 Ma to 7.4 Ma, where very much is unknown, regarding Old World Monkeys. The examination and finds of the Cercopithecoids has allowed for the Tugen Hills to become a place of evolutionary evidence as well as included the middle to late Miocene period, an era that can be studied through its environment and compared to that of other ancestral eras. Tugen Hills provides great information and debate to the entire understanding of the human ancestor. Paleoanthropologists such as Martin Pickford, highlights what is whether or not many of these fossil finds at Tugen Hills belong to humans or that of apes and monkeys. Tugen Hills at Kenya is a key site in understanding paleoanthropological research as well as the divergence, as previously mentioned, from humans to modern apes.
