= Brigitte Senut =

French paleoprimatologist and paleoanthropologist

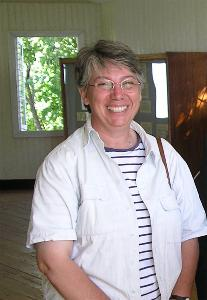
- Senut in 2009
- Born: 27 January 1954 (age 72); Paris, France
- Education: Pierre-et-Marie-Curie University; Musée National d'Histoire naturelle
- Occupations: Paleoprimatologist and paleoanthropologist
- Spouse: Martin Pickford

Brigitte Senut (27 January 1954, Paris) is a French paleoprimatologist and paleoanthropologist and a professor at the National Museum of Natural History, Paris. She is a specialist in the evolution of great apes and humans.

== Life and work ==
Senut is a naturalist and geologist by training and began studying human paleontology and paleoprimatology at a young age. She earned her master's degree in geology at the Pierre-et-Marie-Curie University of Paris in 1975, and specialized in vertebrate and human paleontology, obtaining a doctorate (DEA) in 1976 and defended her doctoral dissertation in 1978. She was interested in the function-phylogeny link in her thesis entitled Contribution à l'étude de l'humérus et de ses articulations chez les Hominidés du Plio-Pléistocène (Contribution to the study of the humerus and its joints in Plio-Pleistocene Hominids).

In 1987, Senut obtained her post doctoral habilitation degree to direct research at the National Museum of Natural History, France, under the direction of anthropologist Yves Coppens, with her thesis entitled Le coude des primates hominoïdes: aspects morphologiques, fonctionnels, taxonomiques et évolutifs (The elbow of hominoid primates: morphological, functional, taxonomic and evolutionary aspects). Senut participated in research on Lucy with the French contingent studying it. Additionally, her research related to the fossils from the African Great Lakes and Ethiopia has allowed her to push back the date of hominid presence in this subregion. She collaborated with Christine Tardieu on these research projects.

Senut has been a professor in the Department of Earth History at the National Museum of Natural History, France, since 1986.

Below is a list of taxa that Senut has contributed to naming:

Year	Taxon	Authors
2015	Namapsitta praeruptorum gen. et sp. nov.	Mourer-Chauviré, Pickford, & Senut
2015	Scopelortyx klinghardtensis gen. et sp. nov.	Mourer-Chauviré, Pickford, & Senut
2001	Orrorin tugenensis gen. et sp. nov.	Senut, Pickford, Gommery, Mein, Cheboi, & Coppens
1992	Otavipithecus namibiensis gen. et sp. nov.	Conroy, Pickford, Senut, Van Couvering, & Mein

== Excavations ==
Senut has initiated and led several international cooperation projects in Africa, including sites in Uganda, Kenya, Namibia, South Africa, Angola and Botswana. She joined forces with the British researcher Martin Pickford, with whom she has made several major discoveries. She participated in many discoveries of fossil great apes in Africa: Otavipithecus in Namibia (12 to 13 million years ago (Mya)), Ugandapithecus and Kogolepithecus in Uganda (20 Mya), the oldest great ape found in South Africa (18 Mya), and in 2011 an exceptionally well preserved skull of Proconsul major.

In 2000, Senut, Pickford and their team discovered in Kenya 12 fossil fragments of a new species of Hominina, which they named in 2001 Orrorin tugenensis. The fossils were found in three Kenyan localities in the Tugen Hills (Baringo district), in the Lukeino formation. They are dated to about 5.9 Mya and thus represent the second oldest hominina known to date, after Sahelanthropus tchadensis.

She also helped establish a local community museum at Kipsaraman, Kenya.

== Awards ==
- Broca Medal from the Paris Anthropology Society, 1988.
- Winner of the Nathalie Demassieux Prize (Science) 1988 from the Chancellery of the Universities of Paris.
- CNRS silver medal, 2000
- Knight in the National Order of Merit (Research) 2002
- Knight in the National Order of the Legion of Honor (category Research, 2008).
- Irène-Joliot-Curie prize for woman scientist of the year in 2008.
- Cino Del Duca scientific prize In 2019 from the Simone and Cino Del Duca Foundation, becoming the third woman to receive it.

== Selected publications ==
Senut has authored more than 240 original scientific publications.

- Yves Coppens, Brigitte Senut, Origins of bipedalism in hominids, CNRS editions, September 1998
- Herbert Thomas, Brigitte Senut, Primates, ancestors of man, Éditions Artcom, 1999
- Michel Devillers, Brigitte Senut, And the monkey stood up... African adventures of a paleontologist, Albin Michel, October 2008
- Brigitte Senut, The Great Apes, Vuibert, February 2009
- Anna Alter, Brigitte Senut, Who are our ancestors? Great ape, man, what we don't know yet..., publisher Le Pommier, June 2015

== Filmography ==
- Brigitte Senut, the Fossil Hunting Lady, documentary film by Philippe Ayme, 2012, with Senut playing herself.

== Abbreviation (zoology) ==
The abbreviation Senut is used to indicate Brigitte Senut as an authority on description and taxonomy in zoology.
